= Ken Nordine discography =

The discography of Ken Nordine encompasses 15 studio albums released between 1955 and 2005. Nordine made several guest appearances on other artists recordings and his tracks featured on several compilations.

== Albums ==
- 1955 – Passion in the Desert (FM)
- 1957 – Word Jazz (Dot)
- 1958 – Son of Word Jazz (Dot)
- 1958 – Love Words (Dot) – also released as The Voice of Love (Hamilton)
- 1959 – Next! (Dot)
- 1960 – Word Jazz Vol. II (Dot)
- 1967 – Colors (Philips)
- 1967 – Ken Nordine Does Robert Shure's Twink (Philips)
- 1979 – Stare with Your Ears (Snail)
- 1984 – Triple Talk (Snail)
- 1986 – Grandson of Word Jazz (Snail)
- 1991 – Devout Catalyst (Grateful Dead)
- 1993 – Upper Limbo (Grateful Dead)
- 2001 – Transparent Mask (Asphodel)
- 2005 – The Eye Is Never Filled (DVD, Snail)

=== Compilations ===
- 1959 – My Baby (Dot) compilation of Word Jazz and Son Of Word Jazz
- 1968 – The Classic Collection: The Best of Word Jazz Vol. 3 (Dot)
- 1971 – How Are Things in Your Town? (Blue Thumb) - 2LP
- 1990 – The Best Of Word Jazz, Vol. 1 (Rhino) CD compilation of Word Jazz, Son Of Word Jazz, Next! and Word Jazz Vol. II
- 2005 – You're Getting Better: The Word Jazz Dot Masters (Hip-O Select) - 2CD

=== Guest appearances ===
- 1955 – The Shifting Whispering Sands – Billy Vaughn (Dot) (credited as Ken Nordene on this release)
- 1957 – Concert in the Sky – Teddy Phillips and His Orchestra (Decca)
- 1958 – Sounds in Space (RCA Victor SP-33-13)
- 1962 – Radio Rebus (US Army Recruiting Service)
- 1968 – H. P. Lovecraft II – H. P. Lovecraft (Philips) – "Nothing's Boy"
- 1997 – Fun for the Whole Family– Lord Runningclam (Bottom Heavy) / 1998 (Moonshine Music) – "Faces in the Night" and "Flibberty Jib"
- 1998 – Sound Museum – Towa Tei (Elektra) – "The Sound Museum"
- 2000 – A Dub Plate of Food Vol. 2 – DJ Food (Ninja Tune)
- 2000 – Kaleidoscope – DJ Food (Ninja Tune) – "The Ageing Young Rebel"
- 2000 – Xen Cuts – Various Artists – DJ Food (Ninja Tune) – "The Ageing Young Rebel"
- 2002 – Cago – Dead Man Ray (Virgin) – "Blue Volkswagen 10:10 AM"
- 2007 – Excellent Italian Greyhound – Shellac (Touch & Go) – "Genuine Lulabelle" [uncredited]
- 2012 – The Search Engine DJ Food – "All Covered In Darkness"(sampled vocal)

=== Compilation tracks ===
- 1959 – Deejay's Choice: 25 Top Album Performances on Dot (Dot) – "My Baby"
- 1959 – Excerpts from the Original Soundtrack of Another Evening with Fred Astaire (Chrysler) – "My Baby"
- 1965 – A Child's Introduction to the Classics (Childcraft/Wing) – "Barber of Seville"
- 1973 – Original Early Top 40 Hits (Paramount) – "The Shifting Whispering Sands, Part 1" with Billy Vaughn
- 1988 – Stay Awake: Various Interpretations of Music from Vintage Disney Films (A&M)
- 1991 – Train of Thought: Stories, Music & Eclectic Audio Entertainment, Vol.1 (Com Audio) – "Mr. City"
- 1992 – The Beat Generation box set (Rhino) – "Reaching Into In" and "Hunger Is From"
- 1993 – A Chance Operation: The John Cage Tribute (Koch) – "A Cage Went in Search of a Bird"
- 1994 – Incredibly Strange Music, Vol. 2 (Asphodel) – "Flesh," "Green" and "Yellow"
- 1995 – All Day Thumbsucker Revisited (Blue Thumb/GRP) – "Roger"
- 1995 – Chop Suey Rock (Hot & Sour) – "Hot" as Ken Nordine and His Kinsmen
- 1995 – Monster Sounds and Boppin' Tracks (Marginal) – "Strollin' Spooks"
- 1997 – Closed on Account of Rabies: Poems and Tales of Edgar Allan Poe (Mercury) – "The Conqueror Worm"
- 1999 – The Annoying Music Show's The Annoying Music Show CD
- 2000 – The Annoying Music Show's The Annoying Music Show Holiday CD – "Ken Nordine Says Jim Nayder's Name"
- 2002 – The Best of the Beat Generation (Rhino) – "My Baby"

=== Related recordings ===
- 1951 – Incredible But True Radio (Columbia)
