= Billy Bean (musician) =

American jazz guitarist

- Born: William Fredrick Bean; December 26, 1933; Philadelphia, Pennsylvania, U.S.
- Died: February 6, 2012 Philadelphia
- Genres: Jazz
- Occupation: Musician
- Instrument: Guitar
- Years active: 1956–1986
- Label: Decca

William Fredrick Bean (December 26, 1933 – February 6, 2012) was an American jazz guitarist from Philadelphia.

== Career ==
Bean was born into a musical family in Philadelphia. His mother played the piano. His father was an amateur singer and guitarist, and his sister was a professional singer. He started on guitar at the age of twelve.

His father taught him some of the basics on guitar before he received lessons from Howard Herbert. Then he studied for about one year with Dennis Sandole. During the late 1940s and 1950s, he performed at venues in the Philadelphia area. In the mid-1950s, he moved to New York City and recorded with Charlie Ventura and Red Callender, and in 1958 he moved to Los Angeles to record for Decca. In Los Angeles, he worked with Buddy Collette, Paul Horn, John Pisano, Bud Shank, Milt Bernhart, Les Elgart, Herb Geller, Lorraine Geller, Calvin Jackson, and Zoot Sims.

In October, 1959, Bean returned to New York City after accepting Tony Bennett's offer to join his band. He remained with Bennett's band for less than one year. Hal Gaylor, who had been Bennett's bassist, assembled a trio with Bean and pianist Walter Norris; they called themselves The Trio and recorded an album for Riverside in 1961. Gaylor said the trio had great difficulty in finding work and disbanded shortly after recording. Bean performed with Stan Getz, Herbie Mann, and John Lewis, recording albums with Mann and Lewis. He returned to his hometown of Philadelphia, retiring in 1986.

== Discography ==
=== As co-leader ===
- Makin' It – Guitar Duets with John Pisano (Decca, 1958)
- Take Your Pick with John Pisano (Decca, 1958)
- The Trio with Hal Gaylor, Walter Norris (Riverside, 1961)
- Makin' It Again with John Pisano (String Jazz, 1998)
- West Coast Sessions with John Pisano, Dennis Budimir (String Jazz, 2000)
- Finale (String Jazz, 2002)

=== As sideman ===
- Milt Bernhart, The Sound of Bernhart (Decca, 1958)
- Red Callender, The Lowest (MetroJazz, 1958)
- Buddy Collette, Polynesia (Music & Sound, 1959)
- Buddy DeFranco, Cross Country Suite (Dot, 1958)
- Paul Horn, Plenty of Horn (Dot, 1958)
- Fred Katz, Folk Songs for Far Out Folk (Warner Bros., 1959)
- John Lewis, Essence (Atlantic, 1962)
- Herbie Mann, Brazil, Bossa Nova & Blues (United Artists, 1962)
- Herbie Mann, Right Now (Atlantic, 1962)
- Carmen McRae, Carmen for Cool Ones (Decca, 1958)
- Annie Ross & Zoot Sims, A Gasser! (World Pacific, 1959)
- Bud Shank, Slippery When Wet (World Pacific, 1959)
- Bud Shank, The Pacific Jazz Bud Shank Studio Sessions (Mosaic, 1998)
- Zoot Sims, Choice (Pacific Jazz, 1961)
- Charlie Ventura, The New Charlie Ventura in Hi-Fi (Baton, 1956)
- Charlie Ventura, Plays Hi-Fi Jazz (Tops, 1957)
