= Carmen for Cool Ones =

Studio album by Carmen McRae
- Released: 1958
- Recorded: December 5, 16, 1957, Los Angeles, California
- Genre: Vocal jazz, cool jazz
- Length: 36:15
- Label: Decca DL-8738

Carmen McRae chronology
| Mad About the Man (1958) | Carmen for Cool Ones (1958) | Birds of a Feather (1958) |

Carmen for Cool Ones is a 1958 album by jazz singer Carmen McRae, arranged and directed by cellist Fred Katz.

== Reception ==
Professional ratings
Review scores
| Source | Rating |
|---|---|
| Allmusic | 4/5 stars |

Allmusic awarded the album four stars and reviewer Ken Dryden wrote that McRae was on "great form" on the album and particularly praised "All the Things You Are", "What's New?" and a "particularly dark version" of "The Night We Called It a Day".

== Track listing ==
1. "All the Things You Are" (Oscar Hammerstein II, Jerome Kern) – 2:26
2. "A Shoulder to Cry On" (Chuck Darwin, Paulette Girard) – 3:53
3. "Any Old Time" (Artie Shaw) – 3:10
4. "Weak for the Man" (Jeanne Burns) – 4:08
5. "What's New?" (Johnny Burke, Bob Haggart) – 2:29
6. "I Get a Kick Out of You" (Cole Porter) – 2:15
7. "What Can I Say After I Say I'm Sorry?" (Walter Donaldson, Abe Lyman) – 1:47
8. "Without a Word of Warning" (Mack Gordon, Harry Revel) – 3:20
9. "You Are Mine" (Ted Snyder, Sam Lewis, Joe Young) – 1:55
10. "If I Were a Bell" (Frank Loesser) – 3:27
11. "The Night We Called It a Day" (Tom Adair, Matt Dennis) – 4:27
12. "I Remember Clifford" (Benny Golson, Jon Hendricks) – 2:58

== Personnel ==
- Carmen McRae – vocals
- Fred Katz – arranger, conductor, cello
- Ike Isaacs – double bass (except track 6)
- Specs Wright – drums (exc. track 6)

on tracks 1, 7, 10

- Harry Klee – flute solo
- George W. Smith – clarinet
- Justin Gordon, Mahlon Clark – bass clarinet

on tracks 2, 4, 9 and 12

- Buddy Collette – flute, alto saxophone
- George W. Smith – clarinet
- Justin Gordon – bass clarinet
- Warren Webb – oboe
- Joe Marino – piano
- Joseph R. Gibbons – guitar
- Thirteen unknown string players

on tracks 3, 5, 8 and 11

- Joe Marino, John T. Williams – piano, celeste
- Larry Bunker, Frank Flynn – vibraphone, marimba

on track 6

- Pete Candoli, Ray Linn – trumpet
- Vincent DeRosa – French horn
- Bob Enevoldsen, Milt Bernhart – trombone
- Tommy Johnson – tuba
- Calvin Jackson – piano
- Billy Bean – guitar
- Red Mitchell – double bass
- Larry Bunker – drums
