= Six-String Santa =

Studio album by Joe Pass
- Released: August 6, 1992
- Recorded: February 2, 1992
- Studio: Sage & Sound Studios, Hollywood, CA
- Genre: Jazz
- Length: 45:36
- Label: LaserLight Digital
- Producer: Ralph Jungheim

Joe Pass chronology
Virtuoso Live! (1991)	Six-String Santa (1992)	Live at Yoshi's (1992)

Six-String Santa is an album by jazz guitarist Joe Pass that was released in 1992.

== Reception ==
Professional ratings
Review scores
Source	Rating
Allmusic	4/5 stars

Writing for Allmusic, music critic Scott Yanow wrote "Pass and his regular working quartet of the early '90s (rhythm guitarist John Pisano, bassist Jim Hughart and drummer Colin Bailey) perform a variety of famous Christmas-related songs, plus his own "Happy Holiday Blues." The tasteful renditions swing and include quartet pieces, some two-guitar duets and a few unaccompanied solos from the great Pass, resulting in one of the better Christmas albums around."

== Track listing ==
No.	Title	Writer(s)	Length
1.	"Let It Snow, Let It Snow, Let It Snow"	Sammy Cahn, Jule Styne	3:39
2.	"(There's No Place Like) Home for the Holidays"	Robert Allen, Al Stillman	3:58
3.	"White Christmas"	Irving Berlin	3:14
4.	"God Rest Ye Merry Gentlemen"	traditional	3:20
5.	"O Christmas Tree"	traditional	3:31
6.	"Angels We Have Heard on High/Joy to the World"	traditional	4:36
7.	"Happy Holiday Blues"	Joe Pass	5:16
8.	"It Came Upon a Midnight Clear"	Edmund Sears, Richard Storrs Willis	4:28
9.	"Santa Claus Is Coming to Town"	J. Fred Coots, Haven Gillespie	4:45
10.	"Have Yourself a Merry Little Christmas"	Hugh Martin, Ralph Blane	4:36
11.	"Winter Wonderland"	Felix Bernard, Richard Smith	4:13

== Personnel ==
- Joe Pass – leader, arranger, guitar
- John Pisano – rhythm guitar
- Jim Hughart – acoustic bass
- Colin Bailey – drums

Production & other

- Ralph Jungheim – producer
- Bill Lightner – editing, mastering
- James Mooney – engineer
- Jerry Wood – second engineer
- Leonard Feather – liner notes
