= Dick Marx =

American musician

- Also known as: Richard Marx Sr.
- Born: Richard Henry Marx; April 12, 1924; Chicago, Illinois, US
- Died: August 12, 1997 (aged 73) Highland Park, Illinois, US
- Genres: Jazz, pop, rock
- Occupation(s): Musician, arranger, composer
- Instrument: Piano
- Years active: 1950s–1997

Richard Henry Marx (April 12, 1924 – August 12, 1997) was an American jazz pianist and arranger. He also composed for film, television, and commercials.

== Personal life ==
Marx and his wife, Ruth (née Guildoo) had a son, Richard Marx, pop singer, songwriter, and record producer. Marx also had two daughters and a son, from a previous marriage. He was of German Jewish descent.

== Career ==
Marx played piano in childhood. He got his professional start playing in nightclubs in Chicago. In the 1950s, he accompanied singer Helen Merrill and released several albums.

Beginning in the 1960s, he spent three decades in advertising, writing commercial jingles for Dial soap, Kellogg's Raisin Bran cereal, Ken-L Ration dog food, Nestle's Crunch candy bars, Arm & Hammer baking soda, Virginia Slims cigarettes, La Choy Chinese food, the Chicago Blackhawks hockey team, and many more. His son Richard and wife Ruth sang on some of the commercials.

Dick Marx also composed a theme for news programs on WBBM-TV in 1975 that would eventually expand to other local stations owned and operated by CBS and used in different arrangements over nearly 50 years before the network introduced a new theme that aligned with its current branding. In the 1980s, he moved to Los Angeles and composed music for the films A League of Their Own and Edwards and Hunt and the television program Fudge. He also performed the horn arrangements on his son's song "Children of the Night".

== Death ==
Marx died in 1997 in Highland Park, Illinois, from injuries caused by a car accident in Las Vegas.

== Discography ==
=== As leader ===
- Too Much Piano (Brunswick, 1955)
- Dick Marx Piano (Coral, 1957)
- Marx Makes Broadway with Buddy Collette (VSOP, 1957)
- Delicate Savagery (Coral, 1958)
- You Haven't Seen the USA Until You've Seen Chicago! (DMA, 1968) written by Dick Marx, Paul Severson & Eric Stigler

=== As sideman or guest musician ===
With Johnny Frigo

- I Love John Frigo...He Swings (Mercury, 1957)

With Eddie Harris

- Eddie Harris Goes to the Movies (Vee-Jay, 1962)

With Helen Merrill

- The Nearness of You (EmArcy, 1958)

With Ken Nordine

- Word Jazz (Dot, 1957)
- Son of Word Jazz (Dot, 1958)
- Love Words (Dot, 1958)
- Next! (Dot, 1959)

With others

- 1957 The Singing Reed, Lucy Reed
- 1987 Richard Marx, Richard Marx
- 1992 S'Wonderful, George Gershwin
- 1992 The Gershwin Songbook: 'S Wonderful, George Gershwin
- 1995 Pee Wee King and His Golden West Cowboys, Pee Wee King & His Golden West Cowboys
- 1995 The Complete Gershwin Songbooks, George Gershwin
- 1997 America's Song Butchers: The Weird World of Homer & Jethro, Homer and Jethro
- 2006 Blue Suede Shoes: Gonna Shake This Shack Tonight, Pee Wee King

=== As arranger or conductor ===
- 1989 Repeat Offender, Richard Marx
- 1994 Have a Little Faith, Joe Cocker
- 1996 Kissing Rain, Roch Voisine
- 1997 Across from Midnight, Joe Cocker
- 1997 Flesh & Bone, Richard Marx
- 1993 Art Of Life, X Japan
