= Appassionato =

Appassionato may refer to:

- Appassionato (music), a music term for "passionately"
- Appassionato (album), a 1990 album by jazz guitarist Joe Pass
