= South Pacific in Hi-Fi =

Studio album by Chico Hamilton Quintet
- Released: 1958
- Recorded: January 15, 24, 29–30, 1958; Los Angeles, CA
- Genre: Jazz
- Label: World Pacific PJ-1238
- Producer: Richard Bock

Chico Hamilton chronology
Sweet Smell of Success (1957)	South Pacific in Hi-Fi (1958)	Chico Hamilton Trio Introducing Freddie Gambrell (1958)

South Pacific in Hi-Fi is an album by drummer and bandleader Chico Hamilton featuring jazz interpretations of themes from the Broadway musical South Pacific. It was released in 1958 on the Pacific Jazz label.

== Reception ==
Professional ratings
Review scores
Source	Rating
AllMusic	3/5 stars

AllMusic rated the album 3 stars.

== Track listing ==
All compositions by Richard Rodgers and Oscar Hammerstein II.

No.	Title	Length
1.	"A Wonderful Guy"	3:12
2.	"This Nearly Was Mine"	3:45
3.	"Dites Moi"	2:57
4.	"Some Enchanted Evening"	3:13
5.	"Bali Ha'i"	4:42
6.	"There Is Nothing Like a Dame"	3:00
7.	"Younger Than Springtime"	3:27
8.	"Happy Talk"	2:55
9.	"A Cockeyed Optimist"	1:50
10.	"Honey Bun"	4:17
11.	"I'm Gonna Wash That Man Right Outa My Hair"	2:35
Total length:		35:53

== Personnel ==
- Chico Hamilton - drums
- Paul Horn - alto saxophone, flute, arranger
- Fred Katz - cello, arranger
- John Pisano - guitar, arranger
- Hal Gaylor - bass
- Calvin Jackson, Carson Smith - arranger
