= Joe's Blues =

Joe's Blues may refer to:

- Joe's Blues (Johnny Hodges and Wild Bill Davis album), 1965
- Joe's Blues (Joe Pass album), 1998
