= You Were Meant for Me =

You Were Meant for Me may refer to:

- You Were Meant for Me (film), a 1948 musical starring Dan Dailey
- "You Were Meant for Me" (1929 song), a pop standard written by Arthur Freed and Nacio Herb Brown
- "You Were Meant for Me" (Jewel song)
- "You Were Meant for Me", a 1978 single by Donny Hathaway (not included in any studio albums), written by William James Peterkin.
