= Duets (Joe Pass and John Pisano album) =

Studio album by Joe Pass and John Pisano
- Released: 1991
- Recorded: February 16–17, 1991
- Studio: Group IV Recording Studios, Hollywood, California, U.S.
- Genre: Jazz
- Length: 47:38
- Label: Pablo
- Producer: Eric Miller

Joe Pass and John Pisano chronology
Appassionato (1990)	Duets (1991)	Virtuoso Live! (1991)

Duets is an album by jazz guitarists Joe Pass and John Pisano that was released in 1991. It was reissued in 1996 by Original Jazz Classics.

The sessions for Duets were based on producer Eric Miller's idea for Pass and Pisano to improvise to a video collage of National Geographic footage, cartoons, and movie clips.

== Reception ==
Professional ratings
Review scores
Source	Rating
AllMusic	3/5 stars
The Penguin Guide to Jazz Recordings	3/4 stars

Writing for AllMusic, music critic Steven MacDonald stated: "A pair of guitarists with a great deal of affection for each other's styles, showcased here in a set of delicate duets that allow both to shine equally. There's never any false flash or glamour, only charm and style." The JazzTimes review concluded: "Aside from the obvious rapport between the players, the blend of acoustic guitar and electric is a warm, happy one. It's another reminder of the void left by Pass' death."

== Track listing ==
1. "Alone Together" (Howard Dietz, Arthur Schwartz) – 6:01
2. "Baileywick" (Joe Pass) – 2:44
3. "S'il Vous Plait" (John Pisano) – 2:38
4. "Lonely Woman" (Horace Silver) – 3:38
5. "Nina's Birthday Song" (Pass) – 4:20
6. "You Were Meant for Me" (Pisano) – 4:19
7. "Blues for the Wee Folk" (Pass) – 4:01
8. "Satie" (Pisano) – 10:21
9. "For Jim H." (Pass) – 6:11
10. "Back to Back" (Pass) – 3:25

== Personnel ==
- Joe Pass – guitar
- John Pisano – guitar
