= John Pisano =

American jazz guitarist (1931–2024)

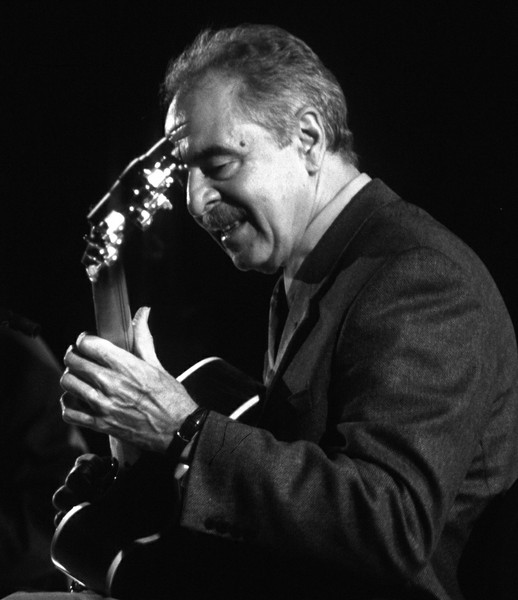

Background information
- Born: February 6, 1931; Staten Island, New York, U.S.
- Died: May 2, 2024 (aged 93) Los Angeles, California, U.S.
- Genre: Jazz
- Occupation: Musician
- Instrument: Guitar
- Years active: 1952–2024
- Labels: Pablo, Mel Bay

John Pisano (February 6, 1931 – May 2, 2024) was an American jazz guitarist. Along with being the “godfather of jazz guitar”, he founded the “Guitar Night” in Los Angeles that had weekly shows for over 20 years, showcasing the greatest guitarists in the world. His “Guitar Night” has shaped many young players and has influenced other “Guitar Nights” around the world, including Frank Vigniola’s in New York.

== Biography ==
John Pisano was born in Staten Island, New York, on February 6, 1931.

Pisano worked with Herb Alpert, Billy Bean, Chico Hamilton, Peggy Lee, and Joe Pass. He died in Los Angeles on May 2, 2024, at the age of 93.

== Discography ==
=== As leader ===
- Makin' It: Guitar Duets with Billy Bean (Decca, 1958)
- Take Your Pick with Billy Bean (Decca, 1958)
- Under the Blanket with Willie Ruff (A&M, 1970)
- The Flying Pisanos (1995)
- Among Friends (Pablo, 1995)
- Duets with Joe Pass (Pablo, 1996)
- Conversation Pieces (Pablo, 1997)
- Makin' It Again (String Jazz, 1998)
- Ensemble (String Jazz, 2000)
- West Coast Sessions with Billy Bean and Dennis Budimir (String Jazz, 2000)
- Affinity with Ray Walker (Jardis, 2000)
- John Pisano's Guitar Night (Mel Bay, 2007)
- Velas with Jose Marino and Kevyn Lettau (Flamingo Jazz, 2017)

=== As sideman ===
With Herb Alpert

- S.R.O. (A&M, 1966)
- Herb Alpert's Ninth (A&M, 1967)
- Christmas Album (A&M, 1968)
- Midnight Sun (A&M, 1992)

With Chico Hamilton

- Chico Hamilton Quintet (Pacific, 1957)
- Sweet Smell of Success (Decca, 1957)
- South Pacific in Hi-Fi (World Pacific, 1958)
- Ellington Suite (World Pacific, 1959)
- Chico Hamilton with Paul Horn (Crown, 1963)
- Easy Livin (Sunset 1969)
- Reunion (Soul Note, 1989)
- The Original Ellington Suite (Pacific, 2000)
- Reunion (Soul Note, 1991)

With Fred Katz

- Zen: The Music of Fred Katz (Pacific Jazz, 1957)
- Soul° Cello (Decca, 1958)
- 4-5-6 Trio (Decca, 1958)
- Fred Katz and his Jammers (Decca, 1960)

With Peggy Lee

- Blues Cross Country (Capitol, 1962)
- I'm a Woman (Capitol, 1963)
- Mink Jazz (Capitol, 1963)
- In Love Again! (Capitol, 1964)
- Pass Me By (Capitol, 1965)
- Somethin' Groovy! (Capitol, 1967)
- Mirrors (A&M, 1975)
- Close Enough for Love (DRG, 1979)

With Sérgio Mendes

- Equinox (A&M, 1967)
- Look Around (A&M, 1968)
- Sérgio Mendes' Favorite Things (A&M, 1968)
- Fool on the Hill (A&M, 1968)
- Sérgio Mendes (A&M, 1983)

With Ken Nordine

- Word Jazz (Dot, 1957)
- Son of Word Jazz (Dot, 1957)
- My Baby (Dot, 1959)

With Joe Pass

- For Django (Pacific Records, 1964)
- Ira, George and Joe (Pablo, 1982)
- Whitestone (Pablo, 1985)
- Summer Nights (Pablo, 1990)
- Appassionato (Pablo, 1991)
- Six-String Santa (Laserlight, 1992)
- Live at Yoshi's (Pablo, 1993)
- My Song (Telarc, 1993)
- Nuages (Live at Yoshi's, vol. 2) (Pablo, 1997)

With others

- Gato Barbieri, Latino America (Impulse!, 1997)
- Les Baxter, Brazil Now (GNP Crescendo, 1967)
- Tony Bennett, The Beat of My Heart (Columbia, 1957)
- Lenny Breau, Live at Donte's (String Jazz, 2000)
- Michael Bublé, Michael Bublé (Reprise, 2003)
- Frank Capp, In a Hefti Bag (Concord, 1995)
- Frank Capp, Play It Again Sam (Concord, 1997)
- Dori Caymmi, Influencias (Universal, 2001)
- Roy Clark and Joe Pass, Roy Clark & Joe Pass Play Hank Williams (Buster Ann Music, 1994)
- Natalie Cole, Unforgettable... with Love (Elektra, 1991)
- Natalie Cole, Ask a Woman Who Knows (Verve, 2002)
- Sam Cooke, Ain't That Good News (RCA, 1964)
- James Darren, This One's from the Heart (Concord Jazz, 1999)
- Lorraine Feather, New York City Drag (Rhombus, 2000)
- Allyn Ferguson, Pictures at an Exhibition Framed in Jazz (Ava, 1963)
- Michael Franks, Dragonfly Summer (Reprise, 1993)
- Lani Hall, Hello It's Me (A&M, 1975)
- Dan Hicks, It Happened One Bite (Warner Bros., 1978)
- Paul Horn, House of Horn (Dot, 1957)
- Paul Horn, Impressions! (World Pacific, 1958)
- Diane Hubka, West Coast Strings (SSJ, 2013)
- Jacintha, The Girl from Bossa Nova (Groove Note, 2004)
- Pete Jolly, Herb Alpert Presents Pete Jolly (A&M, 1968)
- Pete Jolly, Seasons (A&M, 1970)
- Diana Krall, The Look of Love (Verve, 2001)
- Michel Legrand, Michel Plays Legrand (LaserLight, 1994)
- The Limeliters, The Limeliters (Elektra, 1959)
- Barry Manilow, Manilow Sings Sinatra (Arista, 1998)
- Barry Manilow, A Christmas Gift of Love (Columbia, 2002)
- Barry Manilow, The Greatest Songs of the Sixties (Arista, 2006)
- Barry Manilow, The Greatest Songs of the Eighties (Arista, 2008)
- Kei Marimura, La Califusa (Continental, 1986)
- Big Miller, Sings, Twists, Shouts and Preaches (Columbia, 1962)
- Bill Perkins, Quietly There (Riverside, 1970)
- Gil Peterson, Our Last Goodbye (Ace, 1962)
- Dianne Reeves, Art & Survival (EMI, 1994)
- Howard Roberts, Goodies (Capitol, 1965)
- Kenny Rogers, Timepiece (Atlantic, 1994)
- Lalo Schifrin, Gone with the Wave (Colpix, 1964)
- Diane Schuur, Love Songs (GRP, 1993)
- Jimmy Scott, All the Way (Sire, 1992)
- Jimmy Scott, I Go Back Home (Eden River, 2016)
- Bud Shank, Girl in Love (World Pacific, 1966)
- Ben Sidran, Feel Your Groove (Capitol, 1971)
- Barbra Streisand, The Movie Album (Columbia, 2003)
- The Manhattan Transfer, The Christmas Album (Columbia, 1992)
- The Manhattan Transfer, Swing (Atlantic, 1997)
- Nino Tempo, Nino (Atlantic, 1993)
- Walter Wanderley, Perpetual Motion Love (GNP Crescendo, 1981)
- Tim Weisberg, Dreamspeaker (A&M, 1973)
- Stan Wilson, Stan Wilson at the Ash Grove (Verve, 1959)
