= Bill Goodwin (jazz drummer) =

American jazz drummer (born 1942)

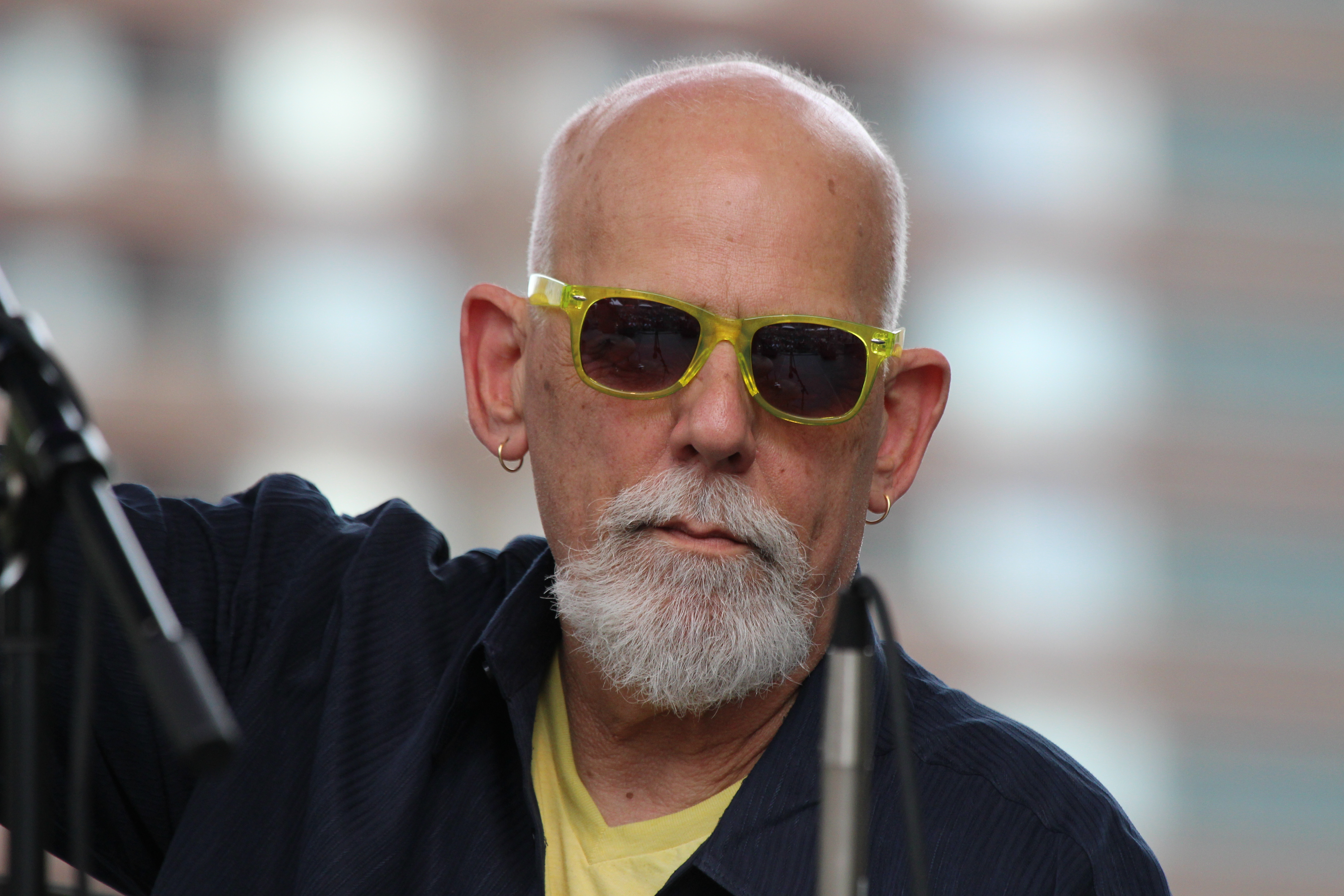
- Goodwin in 2014

Background information
- Born: January 8, 1942 (age 83); Los Angeles, California, U.S.
- Genres: Jazz
- Occupation(s): Musician, record producer
- Instrument(s): Drums, percussion
- Years active: 1960s–present

Bill Goodwin (born Los Angeles, California, January 8, 1942) is an American jazz drummer.

== Career ==
Goodwin began his professional career at the age of seventeen with saxophonist Charles Lloyd. During the 1960s, he worked with Mike Melvoin, Art Pepper, Paul Horn, Frank Rosolino, Bud Shank, George Shearing, and Gabor Szabo.

Joining the performing ensemble of vibraphonist Gary Burton brought him to the East Coast in 1969. After three years with Burton, Goodwin settled in the Pocono Mountains and worked in hotels and resorts. In 1974, he became a founding member of the Phil Woods Quartet. He worked with Woods for forty years as a drummer and record producer, winning three Grammy Awards.

Goodwin has performed with Bill Evans, Lee Konitz Dexter Gordon, Jim Hall, Bobby Hutcherson, June Christy, Joe Williams, Tony Bennett, Mose Allison, and The Manhattan Transfer. He has been a featured performer at the W. C. Handy Music Festival for many years, serving as a member of the W. C. Handy Jazz All-Stars with guitarist Mundell Lowe, guitarist Tom Wolfe, pianist and vocalist Johnny O'Neal, pianist and vocalist Ray Reach, and drummer Chuck Redd.

He was featured on Tom Waits's 1975 album Nighthawks at the Diner and played talking drum on the song "Crown of Creation" by Jefferson Airplane.

Beginning in 2000, Goodwin has taught at William Paterson University in New Jersey.

He currently leads a trio which features Jon Ballantyne on piano and Evan Gregor on bass, performing often in New York at jazz clubs such as Mezzrow and Smalls, as well as other club and concert venues on the East Coast. In late-2023, the trio recorded a follow-up to their acclaimed 2019 release "Trio", which will be released in the summer of 2024.

Goodwin is the son of Bill Goodwin, announcer and actor on the Burns and Allen radio program and The George Burns and Gracie Allen Show on television.

== Discography ==
=== As leader ===
- Solar Energy (1981)
- Plays Cole Porter (1988)
- No Method (Fresh Sound, 1989)
- Three's a Crowd (TCB, 1994)
- Raise Four (Vectordisc 2014)
- Live at the Lafayette Bar (Vectordisc 2017)
- Trio with Jon Ballantyne and Evan Gregor (Vectordisc 2019)

=== As sideman ===
With Gary Burton

- Throb (Atlantic, 1969)
- Gary Burton & Keith Jarrett (Atlantic, 1971)
- Live in Tokyo (Atlantic, 1971)
- Paris Encounter with Stéphane Grappelli (Atlantic, 1972)

With Hal Galper

- Wild Bird (Mainstream, 1972)
- Inner Journey (Mainstream, 1973)

With Paul Horn

- Cycle (RCA Victor, 1965)
- Here's That Rainy Day (RCA Victor, 1966)
- Monday, Monday (RCA Victor, 1966)

With others

- Lee Konitz, Parallels (Chesky Records, 2000)
- Mose Allison, I've Been Doin' Some Thinkin' (Atlantic, 1968)
- Bill Plummer, Cosmic Brotherhood (Impulse!, 1968)
- Gábor Szabó, More Sorcery (Impulse!, 1967)
- Anthony Ortega, New Dance (hatOLOGY, recorded 1967)

=== As producer ===
With Phil Woods

- Phil Woods/Lew Tabackin (Omnisound, 1980)
- More Live (Adelphi, 1982)
- At the Vanguard (Antilles, 1983)
- Dizzy Gillespie Meets Phil Woods Quintet (Timeless, 1986)
- Flowers for Hodges (Concord, 1991)
- At the Deer Head Inn, Keith Jarrett (ECM, 1994)
- Astor & Elis (Chesky, 1996)
- Mile High Jazz (Concord, 1996)
- Live at the Deer Head Inn (Deer Head Records, 2015)
