= The Liquidator (soundtrack) =

Soundtrack album by Lalo Schifrin
- Released: 1965
- Recorded: March 1965
- Venue: London, England
- Genre: Film score
- Length: 34:14
- Label: MGM; CS 8029
- Producer: Jesse Kaye

Lalo Schifrin chronology
Jazz Suite on the Mass Texts (1964)	The Liquidator (1965)	Once a Thief and Other Themes (1965)

The Liquidator is a soundtrack album to the motion picture The Liquidator by Argentine composer, pianist and conductor Lalo Schifrin recorded in 1965 and released on the MGM label. An expanded edition of the soundtrack was released by Film Score Monthly in 2006. Shirley Bassey, then well known for her Goldfinger title song performed two versions of the theme; a hard driving main title theme and a softer romantic version called My Liquidator. Due to the delayed release of the film, the soundtrack was issued later in 1966

== Reception ==
The Allmusic review states "Taking a few cues from Mancini, Ellington, and Bacharach, Schifrin fashions a fetching lounge backdrop here, with enough of the way of original and sophisticated touches to make it worthy of the competition".

Professional ratings
Review scores
Source	Rating
Allmusic	4/5 stars

== Track listing ==
All compositions by Lalo Schifrin except as indicated

1. "The Liquidator" (Lalo Schifrin, Peter Callander) – 2:17
2. "Boysie's Bossa (Instrumental Sax Version)" – 2:48
3. "The Killer" – 1:28
4. "Bikini Waltz" – 2:20
5. "The Bird" – 3:40
6. "Casino Rhapsody" – 3:25
7. "Carry On" – 1:25
8. "Iris" – 2:55
9. "Riviera Chase" – 4:49
10. "Boysie's Bossa" – 2:21
11. "Tilt" – 4:20
12. "My Liquidator" (Schifrin, Callander) – 2:26
- Recorded in London, England in March 1965

== Personnel ==
- Lalo Schifrin – arranger, conductor
- Shirley Bassey – vocals (tracks 1 & 12)
- Ronnie Scott – saxophone
- Tubby Hayes – flute
- Tony Crombie – drums
- Unknown musicians and orchestra
