= Impressions! =

Studio album by Paul Horn Four
- Released: 1959
- Recorded: 1959; Club Renaissance, Hollywood, CA
- Genre: Jazz
- Label: World Pacific WP-1266
- Producer: Richard Bock

Paul Horn chronology
Plenty of Horn (1958)	Impressions! (1959)	Something Blue (1960)

Impressions! is the third album by saxophonist Paul Horn and his first released on the World Pacific label in 1959.

== Reception ==
Professional ratings
Review scores
Source	Rating
Allmusic	3/5 stars

The Allmusic site rated the album 3 stars.

== Track listing ==
All compositions by Paul Horn except as indicated

1. "Maid with the Flaxen Hair" (Claude Debussy) - 2:15
2. "The Little Shepherd" (Debussy) - 1:55
3. "Berceuse" (Igor Stravinsky) - 3:10
4. "Pavane for a Dead Princess" (Maurice Ravel) - 1:26
5. "Waltz #2 & #3" - 3:46
6. "Greensleeves" (Traditional) - 4:32
7. "Baltimore Oriole" (Hoagy Carmichael, Paul Francis Webster) - 3:27
8. "Mist" - 3:30
9. "Good Bait" (Tadd Dameron, Count Basie) - 4:54
10. "Green Dolphin Street" (Bronisław Kaper, Ned Washington) - 5:53

== Personnel ==
- Paul Horn - alto saxophone, flute, clarinet
- John Pisano - guitar
- Gene Estes - vibraphone
- Lyle Ritz - bass
