= Jazz Suite on the Mass Texts =

Studio album by Paul Horn and Lalo Schifrin
- Released: 1965
- Recorded: November 5 & 6, 1964; RCA Victor's Music Center of the World in Hollywood, California
- Genre: Jazz
- Length: 28:58
- Label: RCA Victor LPM 3414
- Producer: Al Schmitt

Paul Horn chronology
Impressions of Cleopatra (1963)	Jazz Suite on the Mass Texts (1965)	Cycle (1965)

Lalo Schifrin chronology
Gone with the Wave (1964)	Jazz Suite on the Mass Texts (1964)	The Liquidator (1965)

Jazz Suite on the Mass Texts is an album by Paul Horn which was composed and conducted by Lalo Schifrin and originally released on the RCA Victor label in 1965.

== Reception ==
Professional ratings
Review scores
Source	Rating
AllMusic	3/5 stars

AllMusic awarded the album 3 stars stating: "The music here is a reflection of the church, using a broader base of textures and colors in jazz. The dynamics are powerful in this performance, and the communication between Horn's quintet, the orchestra led by Lalo Schifrin, and the chorus is undeniably magical. Certainly much of the record can be found leading into the realm of experimental music, and the critical listener should not be so critical, but rather sit, enjoy, and open their mind and listening senses".

== Track listing ==
All compositions by Lalo Schifrin

1. "Kyrie" - 4:13
2. "Interludium" - 2:35
3. "Gloria" - 6:03
4. "Credo" - 3:02
5. "Sanctus" - 2:41
6. "Prayer" - 1:45
7. "Offertory" - 4:35
8. "Agnus Dei" - 4:04

== Personnel ==
- Paul Horn - alto saxophone, flute, alto flute, clarinet
- Conte Candoli, Al Porcino - trumpet
- Frank Rosolino - trombone
- Dick Leith - bass trombone
- Vincent DeRosa - French horn
- Red Callender - tuba
- Dorothy Remsen, Ann Stockton - harp
- Lynn Blessing - vibraphone
- Michael Lang - piano
- Bill Plummer - bass
- Larry Bunker - drums
- Frank Flynn, Milt Holland, Emil Richards, Ken Watson - percussion
- Betty Allen, Evangeline Carmichael, William Cole, Loulie Jean Norman, Marilyn Powell, Vern Rowe, Sara Jane Tallman, Marie Vernon - choir
- Lalo Schifrin - arranger, conductor
