= Monday, Monday (album) =

1966 studio album by the Paul Horn Quintet

Studio album by Paul Horn Quintet with Orchestra arranged and conducted by Oliver Nelson
- Released: 1966
- Recorded: June 1, 2 & 3, 1966; RCA Victor's Music Center of the World in Hollywood, California
- Genre: Jazz
- Label: RCA Victor LPM 3613
- Producer: Al Schmitt

Paul Horn chronology
Here's That Rainy Day (1965)	Monday, Monday (1966)	Paul Horn in Kashmir: Cosmic Consciousness (1968)

Monday, Monday is an album by the Paul Horn Quintet with an orchestra arranged and conducted by Oliver Nelson which was released on the RCA Victor label in 1966.

== Reception ==
Professional ratings
Review scores
Source	Rating
Allmusic	2/5 stars

The Allmusic website awarded the album 2 stars.

== Track listing ==
All compositions by Paul Horn except as indicated

1. "Monday, Monday" (John Phillips) - 2:21
2. "Norwegian Wood (This Bird Has Flown)" (John Lennon, Paul McCartney) - 3:42
3. "Acapulco Gold" - 1:43
4. "Girl" (Lennon, McCartney) - 3:10
5. "Paramahansa" - 3:22
6. "(I Can't Get No) Satisfaction" (Mick Jagger, Keith Richards) - 2:52
7. "Karen's World" - 3:18
8. "You've Got Your Troubles" (Roger Greenaway, Roger Cook) - 2:25
9. "Elusive Butterfly" (Bob Lind) - 1:49
10. "Guv-Gubi" - 2:08
11. "Eight Miles High" (Gene Clark, Jim McGuinn, David Crosby) - 4:00

== Personnel ==
- Paul Horn - flute
- Lynn Blessing - vibraphone
- Mike Lang - piano
- Bill Plummer - double bass
- Bill Goodwin - drums
- Unidentified orchestra arranged and conducted by Oliver Nelson (tracks 1, 2, 4, 6, 8, 9 & 11)
