= Seasons (Pete Jolly album) =

Studio album by Pete Jolly
- Released: 1970
- Recorded: 1970
- Genre: Jazz
- Length: 32:56
- Label: A&M Records; Dusty Groove (reissue)
- Producer: Herb Alpert

Seasons is an album by jazz pianist Pete Jolly.

== Original liner notes ==
Pete Jolly's third album for A&M Records offers the closest recorded approximation of this musician’s talent yet offered the listener. Because in these grooves, produced by Herb Alpert, Jolly is heard not only on standard piano, but also on the Wurlitzer Electronic Piano, accordion, musette, Sano Vox, and Hammond Organ. The effect is startling to say the least, and at times a little unsettling as you wonder where the musician leaves off, and the engineer and technical studio wizards take over.

However, this album is no studio tour de force, but a "Live" recording in the sense that Jolly and fellow musicians Chuck Berghofer, Paul Humphrey, John Pisano, Milt Holland, and Emil Richards got together and improvised their way through 12 tunes in the space of four hours. The session was basically improvisational, and was completely open end, says Jolly. “We literally improvised as we went along – using visual and musical communications between ourselves to let the tunes happen, breathe and expand. It’s as simple as that. Then we edited down the four hours of tape, did a little overdubbing, and this album is the result”.

The result is a radical departure for Jolly, and a quite successful one. There are no familiar tunes here (with the exception of “Younger Than Springtime”) – no lush arrangements, or studio gimmickry. Just Pete and his friends playing for their own enjoyment, and we hope yours. – Bob Garcia

== Track listing ==
Produced by Herb Alpert. All songs by Pete Jolly except where noted.

No.	Title	Writer(s)	Length
1.	"Leaves"		1:43
2.	"Younger Than Springtime"	Rodgers and Hammerstein	2:14
3.	"Bees"		2:54
4.	"Rainbows"		1:11
5.	"Plummer Park"		4:25
6.	"Springs"		3:06
7.	"Seasons"	Roger Nichols	3:45
8.	"Sand Storm"		2:02
9.	"Autumn Festival"		3:14
10.	"Prairie Road"		2:50
11.	"Indian’s Summer"		3:40
12.	"Pete Jolly"		1:45

== Personnel ==
- Pete Jolly – piano, Wurlitzer electric piano, Hammond organ, accordion, musette, Sano Vox
- Chuck Berghofer – bass
- Paul Humphrey – drums
- John Pisano – guitar
- Milt Holland, Emil Richards - percussion

Additional musicians

- Brass arrangement on Indian Summer by Bill Holman
