= Unforgettable (Joe Pass album) =

Studio album by Joe Pass
- Released: 1998
- Recorded: Aug 7–20, 1992 at Group IV Recording Studio, Hollywood, CA
- Genre: Jazz
- Length: 58:04
- Label: Pablo
- Producer: Eric Miller

Joe Pass chronology
Joe's Blues (1998)	Unforgettable (1998)	Resonance (2000)

Professional ratings
Review scores
Source	Rating
Allmusic	4/5 stars
JazzTimes	(favorable)
The Penguin Guide to Jazz Recordings	3/4 stars

Unforgettable is an album by American jazz guitarist Joe Pass, released posthumously in 1998.

All tracks on this album are performed on a nylon string classical guitar, and are from the same 1992 session that produced Songs for Ellen.

== Reception ==
Jim Ferguson (JazzTimes) said of Unforgettable: "Musicians will marvel at Pass' innovative solo voice, facility, and encyclopedic array of harmonic devices, while casual listeners will be soothed by the session's gentle mood. Overall, a vivid look at one facet of the greatest jazz guitarist since Wes Montgomery."

== Track listing ==
1. "My Romance" (Lorenz Hart, Richard Rodgers) – 3:55
2. "The Very Thought Of You" (Ray Noble) – 4:10
3. "I Cover the Waterfront" (Johnny Green, Edward Heyman) – 4:13
4. "Isn't it Romantic" (Hart, Rodgers) – 3:08
5. "Walkin' My Baby Back Home" (Fred E. Ahlert, Roy Turk) – 2:39
6. "Autumn Leaves" (Joseph Kosma, Johnny Mercer, Jacques Prévert) – 2:29
7. "'Round Midnight" (Bernie Hanighen, Thelonious Monk, Cootie Williams) – 5:15
8. "I Should Care" (Sammy Cahn, Axel Stordahl, Paul Weston) – 3:27
9. "Unforgettable" (Irving Gordon) – 2:14
10. "Don't Worry 'bout Me" (Rube Bloom, Ted Koehler) – 4:06
11. "Spring Is Here" (Hart, Rodgers) – 3:22
12. "Moonlight In Vermont" (John Blackburn, Karl Suessdorf) – 3:26
13. "April In Paris" (Vernon Duke, E. Y. Harburg) – 3:35
14. "Stardust" (Hoagy Carmichael, Mitchell Parish) – 3:25
15. "You'll Never Know" (Mack Gordon, Harry Warren) – 2:37
16. "After You've Gone" (Henry Creamer, Turner Layton) – 2:30
17. "I Can't Believe You're In Love With Me" (Gaskill, McHugh) – 2:54

== Personnel ==
- Joe Pass - Acoustic Guitar
- Angel Balestier - Digital Editing, Transfers
- George Horn - Mastering
- David Luke - Digital Editing, Transfers
- Bill Milkowski - Liner Notes
- Eric Miller - Producer
- Jamie Putnam - Art Direction
- Yakao - Photography
