= Roy Clark & Joe Pass Play Hank Williams =

Studio album by Joe Pass and Roy Clark
- Released: 1994
- Recorded: January 1994
- Studio: Sage & Sound Recording, Hollywood, California
- Genre: Jazz, country
- Length: 55:02
- Label: Ranwood
- Producer: Ralph Jungheim

Joe Pass chronology
Songs for Ellen (1994)	Roy Clark & Joe Pass Play Hank Williams (1994)	Joe's Blues (1998)

Alternative Cover
- Cover of the reissue by St. Clair.

Professional ratings
Review scores
Source	Rating
All About Jazz	(favorable)
Allmusic	4/5 stars

Roy Clark & Joe Pass Play Hank Williams is an album by the jazz guitarist Joe Pass and the country guitarist Roy Clark that was released in 1994.

The producer Ralph Jungheim came up with the idea of putting Clark and Pass in the studio together. He first approached Clark, who readily agreed, calling Pass "my idol". Pass agreed for what turned out to be his last session.

The St. Clair label released a 10-track version in 1995 with only Clark and Hank Williams pictured on the cover. It does not include "I Can't Help It (If I'm Still in Love with You)" or "There'll Be No Teardrops Tonight".

== Track listing ==
All tracks are written by Hank Williams except where noted.

No.	Title	Writer(s)	Length
1.	"Hey, Good Lookin'"		4:13
2.	"I Can't Help It (If I'm Still in Love with You)"		4:55
3.	"Your Cheatin' Heart"		4:30
4.	"Blues for Hank"	Joe Pass	3:11
5.	"Cold, Cold Heart"		3:44
6.	"Jambalaya (On the Bayou)"		4:47
7.	"Long Gone Lonesome Blues"		3:28
8.	"Why Don't You Love Me (Like You Used to Do?)"		4:43
9.	"Honky Tonk Blues"		3:23
10.	"There'll Be No Teardrops Tonight"		4:49
11.	"I'll Never Get Out of This World Alive"	Hank Williams, Fred Rose	4:17
12.	"Kaw-Liga"	Hank Williams, Fred Rose	5:09

== Personnel ==
- Joe Pass – guitar
- Roy Clark – guitar
- John Pisano – guitar
- Jim Hughart – double bass
- Colin Bailey – drums

Production

- Ralph Jungheim – producer
- Don Mooney – engineer
- James Mooney – engineer
- Bill Lightner – digital editing, mastering
- Kirk Silsbee – liner notes
