= Paris Encounter =

Studio album by Gary Burton and Stéphane Grappelli
- Released: 1972
- Recorded: November 4, 1969
- Studio: Studios Europe Sonor, Paris
- Genre: Jazz
- Length: 34:48
- Label: Atlantic
- Producer: Jean-Louis Ginibre

Gary Burton chronology
Live in Tokyo (1971)	Paris Encounter (1972)	Alone at Last (1972)

Paris Encounter is an album by vibraphonist Gary Burton and violinist Stéphane Grappelli, recorded in 1969 and released on the Atlantic label.

== Reception ==
The AllMusic review by Scott Yanow stated that "both Grappelli and Burton prove to be flexible enough to have much common ground despite a 35-year difference in age... A frequently delightful set".

Professional ratings
Review scores
Source	Rating
AllMusic	4.5/5 stars
The Penguin Guide to Jazz Recordings	3.5/4 stars
The Rolling Stone Jazz Record Guide	4/5 stars

== Track listing ==
1. "Daphné" (Django Reinhardt) - 4:08
2. "Blue in Green" (Miles Davis, Bill Evans) - 3:39
3. "Falling Grace" (Steve Swallow) - 3:14
4. "Here's That Rainy Day" (Johnny Burke, Jimmy Van Heusen) - 5:28
5. "Coquette" (Carmen Lombardo, Gus Kahn, Johnny Green) - 3:57
6. "Sweet Rain" (Michael Gibbs) - 3:40
7. "The Night Has a Thousand Eyes" (Buddy Bernier, Jerry Brainin) - 3:43
8. "Arpege" (Stéphane Grappelli) - 3:23
9. "Eiderdown" (Swallow) - 4:13

- Recorded at Studios Europe Sonor, Paris, France, on November 4, 1969.

== Personnel ==
Musicians

- Gary Burton – vibraphone
- Stéphane Grappelli – violin
- Steve Swallow – electric bass
- Bill Goodwin – drums

Production

- Jean-Louis Ginibre – producer
- Charles Raucher – engineer
- Haig Adishian – design
- Guy Le Querrec – photography
