= Impressions of Cleopatra =

Studio album by Paul Horn
- Released: 1963
- Recorded: May 27 & 28, 1963; Los Angeles, CA
- Genre: Jazz
- Label: Columbia CL 2050
- Producer: Irving Townsend

Paul Horn chronology
Profile of a Jazz Musician (1962)	Impressions of Cleopatra (1963)	Jazz Suite on the Mass Texts (1964)

Impressions of Cleopatra is an album by flautist Paul Horn featuring a jazz interpretation of Alex North's musical score for the 1963 film, Cleopatra which was originally released on the Columbia label.

== Reception ==
Professional ratings
Review scores
Source	Rating
AllMusic	2/5 stars

AllMusic awarded the album 2 stars.

== Track listing ==
All compositions by Alex North

1. "Caesar and Cleopatra Theme" - 3:55
2. "Cleopatra's Palace Music" - 3:43
3. "Love and Hate" - 3:03
4. "Grant Me an Honorable Way to Die" - 7:03
5. "Antony and Cleopatra Theme" - 4:01
6. "Cleopatra Enters Rome" - 4:51
7. "My Love Is My Master" - 3:20
8. "A Gift for Caesar" - 3:40

== Personnel ==
- Paul Horn - flute
- Emil Richards - vibraphone
- Victor Feldman - piano
- Chuck Israels - bass
- Colin Bailey - drums
- Larry Bunker - percussion
