= Songs for Ellen =

Studio album by Joe Pass
- Released: 1994
- Recorded: August 7–20, 1992
- Studio: Group IV Recording Studio, Hollywood, California
- Genre: Jazz
- Length: 45:26
- Label: Pablo
- Producer: Eric Miller

Joe Pass chronology
| My Song (1993) | Songs for Ellen (1994) | Roy Clark & Joe Pass Play Hank Williams (1994) |

Songs for Ellen is an album by jazz guitarist Joe Pass that was recorded in 1992 and released posthumously in 1994.

== History ==
All tracks on this album are performed on acoustic guitar, are from the same 1992 session that produced Unforgettable. Those two recordings were the only Pass records where he played a nylon-string guitar exclusively. "We had talked about an all-acoustic album for years," (producer) Eric Miller explains. "I wanted to do the equivalent of what Norman (Granz) had done with Art Tatum and Joe. We ran tape all of the time, something I had learned to do with him anyway. It was very satisfying."

The title song is a ballad written for his wife.

== Reception ==
Professional ratings
Review scores
| Source | Rating |
|---|---|
| Allmusic | 4.5/5 stars |
| The Penguin Guide to Jazz Recordings | 3/4 stars |

Writing for Allmusic, music critic Ken Dryden wrote of the album "Most of the works of Joe Pass tended to be improvised blues, so the title track is an exception — a simple yet elegant ballad written for his wife... The good news is that there are several more unreleased sessions by Joe Pass that will follow this superb collection."

== Track listing ==
1. "The Shadow of Your Smile" (Johnny Mandel, Paul Francis Webster) – 2:43
2. "Song for Ellen" (Joe Pass) – 2:55
3. "I Only Have Eyes for You" (Al Dubin, Harry Warren) – 2:52
4. "Stars Fell on Alabama" (Mitchell Parish, Frank Perkins) – 4:07
5. "That Old Feeling" (Lew Brown, Sammy Fain) – 2:53
6. "Star Eyes" (Gene de Paul, Don Raye) – 2:40
7. "Robbins Nest" (Illinois Jacquet, Charles Thompson) – 2:42
8. "Someone to Watch over Me" (George Gershwin, Ira Gershwin) – 3:00
9. "Blues for Angel" (Pass) – 3:36
10. "There's a Small Hotel" (Lorenz Hart, Richard Rodgers) – 2:53
11. "How Deep Is the Ocean?" (Irving Berlin) – 2:25
12. "Stormy Weather" (Harold Arlen, Ted Koehler) – 3:16
13. "Just Friends" (John Klenner, Sam M. Lewis) – 3:21
14. "Blue Moon" (Hart, Rodgers) – 3:29
15. "Satellite Village" (Pass) – 2:34

== Personnel ==
- Joe Pass – acoustic guitar

Production

- Eric Miller – producer
- Angel Balestier – engineer
- Phil Carroll – assistant engineer
- Frank DeLancie – digital mastering
- David Luke – digital editing
- Josef Woodward – liner notes
