= Love Words =

Album by Ken Nordine

Studio album by Ken Nordine
- Released: 1958
- Recorded: 1958
- Genre: Jazz
- Length: 29:43
- Label: Dot DLP 3115

Ken Nordine chronology
Son of Word Jazz (1957)	Love Words (1958)	Next! (1959)

Love Words (subtitled Ken Nordine Speaks Lyrically of Love) is an album by voice-over and recording artist Ken Nordine, which was released on the Dot label in 1958. The album featured Nordine's spoken word interpretations of love songs, a departure from his previous work which featured his surreal or humorous monologues.

== Reception ==
Professional ratings
Review scores
Source	Rating
Allmusic	3/5 stars

The Allmusic site rated the album 3 stars stating "The idea of taking Word Jazz weirdo Ken Nordine and having him perform several romantic jazz standards in a beatnik-esque spoken-word style sounds like it would either be awfully fantastic or fantastically awful. Perhaps the worst thing that can be said about the result is that it's neither. Even though he's not able to pull this off in its entirety, this is the sort of thing that would make you smile if someone dropped one of the tracks onto a mixtape or into an eclectic radio set".

== Track listing ==
1. "All the Things You Are" (Oscar Hammerstein II, Jerome Kern) – 2:52
2. "Midnight Sun" (Sonny Burke, Lionel Hampton, Johnny Mercer) – 2:30
3. "You Do Something to Me" (Cole Porter) – 2:34
4. "These Foolish Things" (Harry Link, Holt Marvell, Jack Strachey) – 3:05
5. "All of You" (Porter) – 2:37
6. "I'll Be Seeing You" (Sammy Fain, Irving Kahal) – 2:35
7. "I'm Glad There Is You" (Jimmy Dorsey, Paul Mertz) – 2:19
8. "The Touch of Your Lips" (Ray Noble) – 2:31
9. "My Funny Valentine" (Lorenz Hart, Richard Rodgers) – 2:40
10. "Don't Take Your Love from Me" (Henry Nemo) – 2:07
11. "When I'm With You" (Mack Gordon, Harry Revel) – 1:33
12. "There Will Never Be Another You" (Mack Gordon, Harry Warren) – 2:20

== Personnel ==
- Ken Nordine – narration
- Fred Katz – cello
- Dick Marx – piano
- Johnny Frigo – bass
- Red Holt – drums
