= Gone with the Wave =

Soundtrack album by Lalo Schifrin
- Released: 1965
- Recorded: October 1964; Los Angeles, California
- Genre: Film score
- Length: 31:35
- Label: Colpix; CP 492
- Producer: Stanley Wilson

Lalo Schifrin chronology
New Fantasy (1964)	Gone with the Wave (1965)	Jazz Suite on the Mass Texts (1965)

Gone with the Wave is a soundtrack album to the surf film of the same name by Argentine composer, pianist and conductor Lalo Schifrin recorded in 1964 and released on the Colpix label.

Professional ratings
Review scores
Source	Rating
Allmusic	3/5 stars

== Track listing ==
All compositions by Lalo Schifrin

1. "Gone With the Wave" - 2:42
2. "Laniakea Waltz" - 3:19
3. "A Taste of Bamboo (Hula Twist)" - 2:00
4. "Halieva Blues" - 2:47
5. "Taco-Taquito" - 2:59
6. "Breaks" - 3:24
7. "Aqua Blues" - 3:09
8. "Surf Waltz" - 1:59
9. "Five by Four (Ala Moana)" - 2:57
10. "Breaks Bossa Nova" - 3:36
11. "Waimea Bay" - 2:12
- Recorded in Los Angeles, California in October 1964

== Personnel ==
- Lalo Schifrin - arranger, conductor
- Frank Rosolino - trombone
- Paul Horn - alto saxophone, flute
- Jackie Kelso - tenor saxophone
- Victor Feldman - piano
- Howard Roberts, Bob Bain, John Pisano, Laurindo Almeida, Jack Marshall - guitar
- Joe Mondragon - bass
- Shelly Manne - drums
- Milt Holland, Francisco Aguabella - percussion
