= Zen: The Music of Fred Katz =

Studio album by Fred Katz with Paul Horn and the Chico Hamilton Quintet
- Released: 1957
- Recorded: November 1956; Los Angeles, CA
- Genre: Jazz
- Label: Pacific Jazz PJ-1231
- Producer: Richard Bock

Fred Katz chronology
Zen: The Music of Fred Katz (1957)	Soul° Cello (1958)

Zen: The Music of Fred Katz is the debut album by cellist and composer Fred Katz released on the Pacific Jazz label.

== Reception ==
Professional ratings
Review scores
Source	Rating
Allmusic	3/5 stars

In a retrospective review, Allmusic rated the album at 3 stars and stated: "Some of the music is overly precious and a bit fragile, but there are some swinging moments, making this a worthwhile (if difficult-to-find) Third Stream effort".

== Track listing ==
All compositions by Fred Katz.

No.	Title	Length
1.	"Lord Randall"	7:32
2.	"Suite for Horn I. Allegro II. Zen III. Science Fiction"	13:34
3.	"Pluck It"	2:58
4.	"Classical Katz"	2:59
5.	"Loma"	3:27
6.	"Granada"	3:54
7.	"Katz-Up"	3:51
8.	"Montuna"	4:27
Total length:		42:42

== Personnel ==
- Fred Katz - cello
- Paul Horn - tenor saxophone, alto saxophone, flute, clarinet
- John Pisano - guitar (tracks 1–3 & 5–8)
- Carson Smith - bass (tracks 1–3 & 5–8)
- Chico Hamilton - drums (tracks 1–3 & 5–8)
- Dick Noel, Joe Howard, Herbie Harper - trombone (track 2)
- Harry Klee - flute (track 2)
- Willy Schwartz - clarinet (track 2)
- Julie Jacobs - oboe (track 2)
- Marty Berman - bassoon (track 2)
