= Live in Tokyo (Gary Burton album) =

Live album by Gary Burton Quartet
- Released: 1971 (Japan)
- Recorded: June 2, 1971
- Venue: Sankei Hall, Tokyo
- Genre: Jazz
- Label: Atlantic; QP-8178A

Gary Burton chronology
Gary Burton & Keith Jarrett (1971)	Live in Tokyo (1971)	Paris Encounter (1972)

Live in Tokyo is a live album by American jazz vibraphonist Gary Burton recorded in Tokyo on June 2, 1971, and released in Japan on the Atlantic label. It features Burton with guitarist Sam Brown, bassist Tony Levin and drummer Bill Goodwin.

== Track listing ==
1. Ballet - 7:55
2. On the Third Day - 7:45
3. Sunset Bell - 5:00
4. The Green Mountains - 5:45
5. African Flower - 7:30
6. Portsmouth Figurations - 5:10

== Personnel ==
- Gary Burton – vibes
- Sam Brown – guitar
- Tony Levin – electric bass
- Bill Goodwin – drums
