= Cleopatra (1963 soundtrack) =

Cleopatra: Original Soundtrack Album

Soundtrack album by Alex North
- Released: 1963 (Vinyl); 1997 (CD); 2001 (2X CD)
- Recorded: 1963
- Genre: Soundtrack
- Length: 42:18 (Vinyl); 74:27 (CD); 151:23 (2X CD)
- Label: 20th Century Fox Records
- Producer: Alex North

Cleopatra: Original Motion Picture Soundtrack
- 2001 Varèse Sarabande 2x CD release cover

Cleopatra: Original Soundtrack Album is the soundtrack from the film of the same name, released by 20th Century Fox Records in 1963. The music of Cleopatra was composed and conducted by Alex North, and was recorded and produced in 1963.

It has been released several times, first as an original vinyl album, in 1963. Later, in 1997, it was released in CD format by Tsunami Records, in Germany, as a Limited Edition album. The most popular of the releases was the Deluxe Edition, or 2001 Varèse Sarabande Edition, released as a double CD in 2001.

Joseph L. Mankiewicz, the film's director, made the unusual gesture, for him, of contributing extensive liner notes for the 1963 Original Soundtrack Album. These notes provide a valuable elucidation of many points in Mankiewicz's conception of Cleopatra that are unrealized in the version of the film that was released. Ironically, it was Mankiewicz's son Christopher who recommended North after his enthusiasm for his great score for Spartacus (1960).

In 1964, Cleopatra: Original Soundtrack Album was nominated for the Academy Award for Best Music Score - Substantially Original, and for the Grammy Award for Best Background Score from a Motion Picture or Television, but on both occasions it lost to Tom Jones (1963).

== Releases ==
The soundtrack of Cleopatra was released on Compact Disc in two different versions at two different times. The original vinyl selection of tracks had long gone out of print before digital restorations of the soundtrack was released. The versions are as follows:

- The 1997 limited edition, released by Tsunami Records, an independent German record label, called Cleopatra: The Complete Original Motion Picture Soundtrack, contained selected tracks, not representing the complete range of tracks heard in the film. The Tsunami release is also considered to be of an inferior sound quality and was made redundant by the complete Varèse Sarabande release.
- The 2001 Varèse Sarabande album, named Cleopatra: Original Motion Picture Soundtrack, is by far the most popular release of the soundtrack of Cleopatra. Running over 151 minutes, the album contains the entire score heard in the film in chronological order. It was released over two discs.

== Track listing ==
Cleopatra: Original Soundtrack Album
No.	Title	Length
1.	"Caesar and Cleopatra"	2:35
2.	"A Gift for Caesar"	1:49
3.	"The Fire Burns, The Fire Burns"	2:03
4.	"Taste of Death"	1:46
5.	"Cleopatra Enters Rome"	6:03
6.	"Caesar's Assassination"	4:38
7.	"Epilogue (Act 1)"	2:24
8.	"Antony and Cleopatra"	2:20
9.	"Cleopatra's Barge"	3:02
10.	"Love and Hate"	2:17
11.	"My Love is My Master"	2:12
12.	"Grant Me an Honourable Way to Die"	2:39
13.	"Dying is Less than Love"	4:31
14.	"Antony... Wait"	3:59
Total length:		42:18

Cleopatra: The Complete Original Motion Picture Soundtrack – Germany Limited Edition
No.	Title	Length
1.	"Overture"	2:45
2.	"Caesar and Cleopatra"	2:35
3.	"The Head of Pompeius"	2:58
4.	"A Gift for Caesar"	1:49
5.	"The Palace of Alexandria"	2:58
6.	"The Fire Burns, The Fire Burns"	2:03
7.	"Taste of Death"	1:46
8.	"A Queen's Bedroom"	4:59
9.	"Conspirations and Conflicts"	3:55
10.	"Antony and Calpurnia"	2:05
11.	"Caesar's Farewell"	3:47
12.	"Cleopatra Enters Rome"	6:03
13.	"Caesar's Assassination"	4:38
14.	"Epilogue (Act 1)"	2:24
15.	"Antony and Cleopatra"	2:20
16.	"We Shall Meet in Egypt"	2:40
17.	"Cleopatra's Barge"	3:02
18.	"Antony's Victory"	3:22
19.	"Love and Hate"	2:17
20.	"My Love is My Master"	2:12
21.	"Antony's Farewell"	2:40
22.	"Grant Me an Honourable Way to Die"	2:39
23.	"Dying is Less than Love"	4:31
24.	"Antony... Wait"	3:59
Total length:		74:27

Cleopatra: Original Motion Picture Soundtrack – CD 1
No.	Title	Length
1.	"Overture"	2:42
2.	"Main Title"	2:51
3.	"Pharsalia"	1:17
4.	"Caesar to Egypt"	1:57
5.	"The VIPs / King Ptolemy"	0:59
6.	"Pompey's Ring"	2:53
7.	"A Gift for Caesar"	1:51
8.	"Only Yesterday"	1:31
9.	"Epilepsy"	3:20
10.	"Great Library"	2:05
11.	"Moon Gate"	4:20
12.	"Taste of Death"	1:47
13.	"Sympathy"	1:45
14.	"Coronation"	1:51
15.	"Fertility"	4:49
16.	"Alexander's Tomb"	3:45
17.	"Calpurnia"	1:59
18.	"The Fire Burns / Son of Caesar"	3:43
19.	"Caesar's Departure"	3:40
20.	"Cleopatra Enters Rome"	6:49
21.	"By Divine Right"	2:06
22.	"Death in the Garden"	1:44
23.	"Caesar's Assassination"	4:57
24.	"Requiem"	1:32
25.	"Farewell"	1:39
26.	"Entr'acte" (Caesar & Cleopatra)	2:32
27.	"Hail Antony"	3:12
28.	"Isis"	1:23
29.	"Love Theme" (Reprise)	0:30
Total length:		76:12

Cleopatra: Original Motion Picture Soundtrack – CD 2
No.	Title	Length
1.	"Cleopatra's Barge"	2:54
2.	"Most Becoming"	1:38
3.	"Food"	0:54
4.	"Antony and Cleopatra in Tarses"	3:38
5.	"Bacchus"	2:41
6.	"Antony and Cleopatra's Love"	3:10
7.	"One Breath Closer"	2:40
8.	"Love and Hate"	2:16
9.	"Athens"	2:37
10.	"Cleopatra's Ambition"	1:15
11.	"War"	0:44
12.	"Interlude / Sea Battle"	14:36
13.	"My Love is My Master"	4:17
14.	"Two Heads"	0:46
15.	"Better Late than Never"	2:37
16.	"Cleopatra's Son / Antony's Camp"	2:19
17.	"Never Fear"	3:16
18.	"Grant Me an Honorable Way to Die"	2:37
19.	"Antony's Retreat / Transitions"	2:02
20.	"Dying is Less than Love"	4:26
21.	"Octavian the Victor"	4:05
22.	"Antony... Wait"	3:55
23.	"Epilogue"	2:25
24.	"Exit Music" (Antony & Cleopatra)	2:26
Total length:		74:49

== Nomination and ratings ==
Professional ratings
Review scores
Source	Rating
Allmusic	4.5/5 stars

Cleopatra: Original Soundtrack Album was nominated for the Academy Award for Best Music Score - Substantially Original at the 1964 ceremony, and for the Grammy Award for Best Sound Track Album – Background Score from a Motion Picture or Television at its 1964 ceremony, but on both occasions it lost to Tom Jones (1963), with music composed by John Addison.

On the site Filmtracks.com, the soundtrack is rated 5/5. Allmusic rates the soundtrack 5/5.

== See also ==
- Cleopatra (1963 film)
- Impressions of Cleopatra
