= Fred Katz and His Jammers =

Studio album by Fred Katz
- Released: 1959
- Recorded: March 12, May 26 and August 28, 1959; Decca Studios, Hollywood, CA
- Genre: Jazz
- Label: Decca DL 9217
- Producer: Fred Katz

Fred Katz chronology
Folk Songs for Far Out Folk (1958)	Fred Katz and His Jammers (1959)

Fred Katz and His Jammers is an album by Fred Katz originally released on Decca in 1959.

== Reception ==
Professional ratings
Review scores
Source	Rating
Allmusic	3/5 stars

Allmusic gave the album 3 stars.

== Track listing ==
All compositions by Fred Katz except as indicated

1. "Feeling the Blues" (Leroy Vinnegar) - 6:40
2. "Elegy" - 2:30
3. "Imagination" (Jimmy Van Heusen, Johnny Burke) - 3:22
4. "Vintage 57" (Vinnegar, Walter Norris) - 4:24
5. "Old Folks" (Willard Robison, Dedette Lee Hill) 4:51
6. "The Blow Is to Know" - 4:31
7. "Sometimes I'm Happy" (Vincent Youmans, Irving Caesar) - 4:38
8. "Ruby, My Dear" (Thelonious Monk) - 3:57
9. "Dixie, Why Not?" - 4:08
10. "Dexterity" (Charlie Parker) - 3:32
- Recorded at Decca Studios in Hollywood, CA on March 12 (tracks 1, 3 & 6), May 26 (tracks 4, 5 & 8) and August 28 (tracks 2, 7, 9 & 10), 1959

== Personnel ==
- Fred Katz - cello
- Don Fagerquist (tracks 1, 3-6 & 8), Pete Candoli (tracks 2, 7, 9 & 10) - trumpet
- Gene Estes - vibraphone
- Johnny Pisano - guitar
- Leroy Vinnegar - bass
- Frank Butler (tracks 2, 7, 9 & 10), Billy Higgins (tracks 4, 5 & 8), Lenny McBrowne (tracks 1, 3 & 6) - drums
