= Ars Nova (American band) =

American progressive rock band

- Origin: New York City
- Genres: Progressive rock, psychedelic rock
- Years active: 1967–1969
- Labels: Elektra, Atlantic
- Past members: Wyatt Day; Jon Pierson; Maury Baker; Giovanni Papalia; Bill Folwell; Jonathan Raskin; Sam Brown; Jimmy Owens; Art Koenig; Warren Bernhardt; Joe Hunt

Ars Nova was an American progressive rock band that performed and recorded from 1967 to 1969. The group included two former students from Mannes College in New York City: Wyatt Day (guitar, keyboards, vocals), who wrote or co-wrote most of the band's songs, and Jon Pierson (trombone, vocals).

They recorded two albums. The first was a 1968 self-titled album for the Elektra label, on which the personnel comprised Day, Pierson, Maury Baker (organ, percussion), Giovanni Papalia (lead guitar), Bill Folwell (trumpet, bass, vocals), and Jonathan Raskin (bass, guitar, vocals). The band was signed to Elektra by Paul Rothchild, who produced their self-titled album in Los Angeles, with additional songwriting by Greg Copeland and released in April 1968. However, the band split up after a performance supporting The Doors at the Fillmore East in mid-1968, about the same time as they were promoted with a profile in Life magazine.

Day and Pierson then formed a new version of the band, with guitarist Sam Brown, trumpeter Jimmy Owens, bassist Art Koenig, keyboardist Warren Bernhardt and drummer Joe Hunt. They recorded a second album, Sunshine & Shadows, which was released on Atlantic in 1969.

Former member Bill Folwell died on October 2, 2019, at the age of 80.

== Discography ==
=== Ars Nova (April 1968) ===
Side one

1. "Pavane For My Lady" – (Wyatt Day) – 2:45
2. "General Clover Ends A War" – (lyrics: Gregory Copeland; music: Day) – 2:12
  - "Entracte: Le Messe Notre Dame" – (Guillaume De Machaut, arranged by Ars Nova) – 0:30
3. "And How Am I To Know" – (Day) – 4:45
  - "Entracte: Dancer" – (Maury Baker) – 0:25
4. "Album In Your Mind" – (lyrics: Jon Pierson, Day; music: Day) – 3:01
5. "Zarathustra (Instrumental)" – (Baker) – 3:30

Side two

6. "Fields Of People" – (lyrics: Pierson, Day; music: Day) – 2:52
  - "Entracte: Vita De L'Alma Mia" – (Claudio Monteverdi, arranged by Ars Nova) – 0:45
7. "Automatic Love" – (Day) – 4:06
  - "Entracte: A Thought" – (Pierson, Jonathan Raskin) – 0:47
8. "I Wrapped Her In Ribbons (After Ibiza)" – (lyrics: Copeland; music: Day) – 2:18
  - "Entracte: Ada Wulff November 12, 1956" – (Day) – 0:18
9. "Song To The City" – (lyrics: Copeland; music: Day) – 2:08
  - "Entracte: Aquel Cabellero" – (Anonymous [Spanish Renaissance], arranged by Ars Nova) – 0:55
10. "March Of The Mad Duke's Circus" – (lyrics: Copeland; music: Day) – 3:17

Personnel

- Jon Pierson – lead vocals, bass trombone
- Bill Folwell – trumpet, backing vocals, double bass
- Giovanni Papalia – lead guitar
- Wyatt Day – rhythm guitar, backing vocals, piano, organ
- Jonathan Raskin – bass, backing vocals, guitar
- Maury Baker – drums, percussion, organ

=== Sunshine and Shadows (June 1969) ===
Side one

1. "Sunshine and Shadows" - (Collins, Day) - 3:02
2. "I Was Once" - (Wyatt Day) - 2:57
3. "Temporary Serenade" - (Collins, Day) - 3:00
4. "She Promises Everything" - (Copeland, Day) - 3:18
5. "Well, Well, Well" (Wyatt Day) - 2:55

Side two

6. "You Had Better Listen" - (Jimmy Owens) - 4:07
7. "Round Once Again" - (Wyatt Day) - 3:16
8. "Walk On The Sand" - (Wyatt Day) - 6:20
9. "Rubbish" - (Wyatt Day) - 3:28
10. "Please Don't Go Now" - (Wyatt Day) - 5:41

Personnel

- Jon Pierson - Lead Vocals, Bass Trombone
- Wyatt Day - Backing vocals, Guitar
- Jimmy Owens - Trumpet
- Warren Bernhardt - Keyboard
- Sam Brown - Lead Guitar
- Art Koenig - Bass
- Joe Hunt - Drums, Percussion

=== Singles ===
- "Pavane for My Lady" / "Zarathustra" (April 1968)
- "Fields of People" / "March of the Mad Duke's Circus" (September 1968)
