= Cycle (album) =

Studio album by Paul Horn Quintet
- Released: 1965
- Recorded: March 17 & 18, 1965; Los Angeles, CA
- Genre: Jazz
- Label: RCA Victor LPM 3386
- Producer: Al Schmitt

Paul Horn chronology
Jazz Suite on the Mass Texts (1964)	Cycle (1965)	Here's That Rainy Day (1965)

Cycle is an album by Paul Horn which was originally released on the RCA Victor label in 1965.

Within three years, Horn would abandon jazz altogether to work on atmospheric mood music".

== Reception ==
Professional ratings
Review scores
Source	Rating
AllMusic	2/5 stars

AllMusic awarded the album 2 stars stating: "One can hear hints of Paul Horn's future directions on this obscure LP. ...so this is not an album for everyone." Cycle, credited to the Paul Horn Quintet, was nominated for a 1965 Grammy Award for Best Jazz Album, Small Ensemble.

== Track listing ==
All music is composed by Paul Horn, except where noted. All tracks are produced by Al Schmitt.

No.	Title	Writer(s)	Length
1.	"Greensleeves"	traditional	3:58
2.	"Chim Chim Cher-ee"	Richard M. Sherman; Robert B. Sherman	8:23
3.	"Cycle"		5:15
4.	"Shadows #1"		2:40
5.	"Hi-Lili, Hi-Lo"	Bronisław Kaper; Helen Deutsch	5:32
6.	"In the Bag"		7:11
7.	"Patterns"		4:58
8.	"Shadows #2"		2:17
Total length:			40:14

== Personnel ==
- Paul Horn - alto saxophone, flute, clarinet
- Lynn Blessing - vibraphone
- Mike Lang - piano
- Bill Plummer - bass
- Bill Goodwin - drums
- James Thompson, John Turnbull - bagpipes (tracks 1 & 6)
