= Sam Brown (guitarist) =

American jazz guitarist (1939–1977)

Samuel Tilghman Brown
- Born: January 19, 1939; St. Louis, Missouri, U.S.
- Died: December 27, 1977 Harford County, Maryland
- Genres: Jazz
- Occupation: Musician
- Instrument: Guitar

Sam Brown (January 19, 1939 – December 27, 1977) was an American jazz guitarist.

== History ==
Sam T. Brown's playing style was unusual in that he performed in a generally jazz-rock format, while performing in Keith Jarrett's ensembles that sometimes veered close to a free jazz style. His initial recording success included membership of the jazz rock group Ars Nova during the 1967-1969 period.

Brown's most noteworthy recorded performances were on recordings of Keith Jarrett (particularly, his "American band" with Dewey Redman); and Charlie Haden's Liberation Music Orchestra. On the Liberation Music Orchestra album, he is featured prominently on the 21-minute suite, "El Quinto Regimiento/Los Cuatro Generales/Viva la Quince Brigada".

He also performed as a session musician for popular artists as diverse as James Brown, Astrud Gilberto, Peter Allen , Country Joe McDonald and Barry Manilow.

== Discography ==
=== As sideman ===
With Louis Armstrong

- Louis Armstrong and His Friends (Flying Dutchman/Amsterdam, 1970)

With Carla Bley

- Escalator over the Hill (JCOA 1971)

With Gary Burton

- Good Vibes (Atlantic, 1969)
- Gary Burton & Keith Jarrett (Atlantic, 1970)
- Live in Tokyo (Atlantic, 1971)

With Ron Carter

- Uptown Conversation (Embryo, 1970)
- Blues Farm (CTI, 1973)

With Richard Davis

- The Philosophy of the Spiritual (Cobblestone, 1971)

With Paul Desmond

- Bridge over Troubled Water: Paul Desmond plays the songs of Simon and Garfunkel (CTI, 1970)

With Bill Evans

- Living Time the Bill Evans-George Russell Orchestra (Columbia, 1972)
- From Left to Right (Verve 1971)

With Astrud Gilberto

- Gilberto with Turrentine with Stanley Turrentine (CTI, 1971)

With Gene Harris

- Gene Harris of the Three Sounds (Blue Note, 1972)

With Keith Jarrett

- Expectations (Columbia, 1971)
- Treasure Island (1974)

With Hubert Laws

- Flute By-Laws (Atlantic, 1966)
- Laws' Cause (Atlantic, 1968)

With Thad Jones/Mel Lewis Big Band

- Central Park North (1969)

With the Liberation Music Orchestra

- Liberation Music Orchestra (1969)

With Mike Mainieri

- Journey Thru an Electric Tube (Solid State, 1968)

With Herbie Mann

- First Light (Atlantic, 1974)
- Surprises (Atlantic, 1976)
- Gagaku & Beyond (Finnadar/Atlantic, 1974 [1976])

With Dave Matthews Big Band

- Night Flight (1977)
- Live at the Five Spot (1975)

With Gary McFarland

- Profiles (Impulse!, 1966)
- Simpático with Gábor Szabó (Impulse!, 1966)

With Blue Mitchell

- Many Shades of Blue (Mainstream, 1974)

With Paul Motian

- Conception Vessel (ECM, 1971)
- Tribute (ECM, 1974)

With Mark Murphy

- Bridging a Gap (Muse, 1972)
- Mark II (Muse, 1973)

With Duke Pearson

- The Phantom (1968)

With Pat Rebillot

- Free Fall (1974)

With Jeremy Steig

- Legwork (Solid State, 1970)
- Wayfaring Stranger (Blue Note, 1971)

=== As guest ===
- 1974 Peter Allen, Continental American
