= Phil Woods/Lew Tabackin =

Studio album by Phil Woods and Lew Tabackin
- Released: 1981
- Recorded: December 10, 1980
- Studio: Chelsea Sound Studio, New York
- Genre: Jazz
- Length: 58:26
- Label: Omnisound; N 1033
- Producer: Bill Goodwin

Phil Woods chronology
European Tour Live (1980)	Phil Woods/Lew Tabackin (1981)	Three for All (1982)

Lew Tabackin chronology
Threedom (1980)	Phil Woods/Lew Tabackin (1981)	My Old Flame (1981)

Phil Woods/Lew Tabackin is an album by saxophonists Phil Woods and Lew Tabackin, recorded in 1980 for the Omnisound label and rereleased on Evidence.

== Reception ==
Professional ratings
Review scores
Source	Rating
AllMusic	4.5/5 stars
The Penguin Guide to Jazz	4/4 stars

AllMusic awarded the album 4½ stars, stating: "Everything on this recording works". The Penguin Guide to Jazz selected this album as part of its suggested Core Collection.

== Track listing ==
All compositions by Phil Woods except where noted.

1. "Limehouse Blues" (Philip Braham, Douglas Furber) - 8:04
2. "Sweet and Lovely" (Gus Arnheim, Jules LeMare, Harry Tobias) - 10:54
3. "Lew Blew" - 5:36
4. "Petite Chanson" - 9:39
5. "Theme of No Repeat" (Tadd Dameron) - 7:17
6. "Sittin' Here" - 8:47
7. "Theme of No Repeat" [Alternate Take] (Dameron) - 8:09 Bonus track on CD reissue

== Personnel ==
- Phil Woods - alto saxophone
- Lew Tabackin - tenor saxophone
- Jimmy Rowles - piano
- Michael Moore - bass
- Bill Goodwin - drums
