= Alone at Last (album) =

Live album / studio album by Gary Burton
- Released: 1972
- Recorded: June 19, 1971, and September 7, 1971
- Genre: Jazz
- Length: 39:09
- Label: Atlantic
- Producer: Joel Dorn

Gary Burton chronology
Paris Encounter (1972)	Alone at Last (1972)	Crystal Silence (1973)

Alone at Last is the first solo album by vibraphonist Gary Burton, on which he also plays piano and organ. It was recorded in 1971, and features three performances from the Montreux Jazz Festival and four performances from the studio. It released on the Atlantic label in 1972. The album was awarded a Grammy for Best Jazz Performance by a Soloist at the 15th Grammy Awards.

== Reception ==
The AllMusic review by Scott Yanow called the album "one of the high points of Gary Burton's career... Wondrous music".

Professional ratings
Review scores
Source	Rating
AllMusic	5/5 stars
The Penguin Guide to Jazz Recordings	4/4 stars
The Rolling Stone Jazz Record Guide	3/5 stars

== Track listing ==
1. "Moonchild/In Your Quiet Place" (Keith Jarrett) - 6:14
2. "Green Mountains/Arise, Her Eyes" (Steve Swallow) - 7:35
3. "The Sunset Bell" (Gary Burton) - 5:09
4. "Handbags and Gladrags" (Mike d'Abo) - 6:05
5. "Hullo Bolinas" (Swallow) - 5:49
6. "General Mojo's Well Laid Plan" (Swallow) - 3:38
7. "Chega de Saudade (No More Blues)" (Vinícius de Moraes, Antônio Carlos Jobim) - 4:39

Songs 1–3 recorded at the Montreux Jazz Festival, Montreux, Switzerland, on June 19, 1971.

Songs 4–7 recorded at Atlantic Recording Studios, New York, NY, on September 7, 1971.

== Personnel ==
- Gary Burton – vibraphone, piano, organ
