= Folk Songs for Far Out Folk =

Studio album by Fred Katz
- Released: 1959
- Recorded: July 21, August 19 and September 17, 1958; Hollywood, CA
- Genre: Jazz
- Length: 40:18
- Label: Warner Bros.W 1277
- Producer: Alvino Rey

Fred Katz chronology
4-5-6 Trio (1958)	Folk Songs for Far Out Folk (1959)	Fred Katz and his Jammers (1959)

Folk Songs for Far Out Folk is an album by Fred Katz originally released on Warner Bros. in 1959. It features orchestral jazz interpretations of African, Hebrew and American folk tunes.

== Reception ==
Professional ratings
Review scores
Source	Rating
Allmusic	4.5/5 stars

Allmusic gave the album 4½ stars saying it was "highly recommended".

== Track listing ==
All compositions are traditional.

No.	Title	Length
1.	"Mate'ka"	6:35
2.	"Sometimes I Feel Like a Motherless Child"	4:12
3.	"Been in the Pen So Long"	3:09
4.	"Chili'lo"	3:56
5.	"Rav's Nigun"	3:00
6.	"Old Paint"	4:55
7.	"Manthi-Ki"	5:09
8.	"Baal Shem Tov"	4:01
9.	"Foggy, Foggy Dew"	5:21
Total length:		40:18

== Personnel ==
- Fred Katz - orchestration, conductor, cello
- Pete Candoli, Don Fagerquist, Irving Goodman - trumpet (tracks 1, 4 & 7)
- Harry Betts, Bob Enevoldsen, George Roberts - trombone (tracks 1, 4 & 7)
- Buddy Collette - flute (tracks 5 & 8)
- Paul Horn - flute, alto saxophone (tracks 5 & 8)
- Jules Jacobs - oboe, clarinet (tracks 5 & 8)
- Justin Gordon - bassoon, bass clarinet (tracks 5 & 8)
- George Smith - clarinet (tracks 5 & 8)
- Mel Pollen - bass (tracks 2, 3, 5, 6, 8 & 9)
- Johnny T. Williams - piano (tracks 2, 3, 6 & 9)
- Billy Bean - guitar (tracks 2, 3, 6 & 9)
- Jerry Williams - drums (tracks 2, 3, 6 & 9)
- Gene Estes - vibraphone, percussion (tracks 1–4, 6, 7 & 9)
- Larry Bunker, Jack Constanzo, Carlos Mejia, Lou Singer - percussion (tracks 1, 4 & 7)
