= Here's That Rainy Day (album) =

Studio album by Paul Horn Quintet with Voices
- Released: 1966
- Recorded: November 4, 5 & 8, 1965
- Studio: RCA Victor's Music Center of the World in Hollywood, California
- Genre: Jazz
- Label: RCA Victor LPM 3519
- Producer: Al Schmitt

Paul Horn chronology
Cycle (1965)	Here's That Rainy Day (1966)	Monday, Monday (1966)

Here's That Rainy Day is an album by Paul Horn which was originally released on the RCA Victor label in 1966.

== Reception ==
Professional ratings
Review scores
Source	Rating
AllMusic	2/5 stars

AllMusic awarded the album two stars.

== Track listing ==
1. "Who Can I Turn To (When Nobody Needs Me)" (Leslie Bricusse, Anthony Newley) – 2:35
2. "Here's That Rainy Day" (Jimmy Van Heusen, Johnny Burke) – 2:20
3. "How Insensitive (Insensatez)" (Antônio Carlos Jobim, Norman Gimbel) – 2:44
4. "The Shadow of Your Smile (Love Theme from The Sandpiper)" (Johnny Mandel, Paul Francis Webster) – 3:15
5. "In the Wee Small Hours of the Morning" (David Mann, Bob Hilliard) – 3:54
6. "Girl Talk" (Neal Hefti, Bobby Troup) – 3:11
7. "Moment to Moment" (Henry Mancini, Johnny Mercer) – 1:51
8. "Ecstacy" (William Hood, Paul Horn) – 4:39
9. "Laura" (David Raksin, Mercer) – 3:15
10. "On a Clear Day (You Can See Forever)" (Burton Lane, Alan Jay Lerner) – 3:21

== Personnel ==
- Paul Horn – alto flute, flute, bass flute, clarinet
- Lynn Blessing – vibraphone
- Mike Lang – piano
- Bill Plummer – bass
- Bill Goodwin – drums
- Unidentified choir arranged and conducted by Ralph Carmichael
