= Birds of a Feather (Carmen McRae album) =

Studio album by Carmen McRae
- Released: 1958
- Recorded: August 4, 6 and 8, 1958, New York City
- Genre: Jazz
- Length: 36:11
- Label: Decca DL 8815

Carmen McRae chronology
Carmen for Cool Ones (1958)	Birds of a Feather (1958)	Porgy and Bess (1959)

Birds of a Feather is a 1958 album by Carmen McRae. The album was arranged by Ralph Burns, and features the saxophonist Ben Webster. All the songs on the album reference birds in some way.

== Reception ==
Professional ratings
Review scores
Source	Rating
Allmusic	4/5 stars
The Penguin Guide to Jazz Recordings	3/4 stars

John Bush reviewed the album for Allmusic and wrote that "Fortunately, there are plenty of good songs on the subject, and it's not so narrow that all the focus hinges on birds themselves." Bush praised Ben Webster's solo on "Bob White (Watcha Gonna Swing Tonight?)". Webster's biographer, Frank Buchmann-Moller, wrote that his performances on the album alternate between "routine and inspired", and likened his work on "Flamingo" to the "beating wings of a landing bird".

== Track listing ==
1. "Skylark" (Hoagy Carmichael, Johnny Mercer)
2. "Bob White (Watcha Gonna Swing Tonight?)" (Bernie Hanighen, Johnny Mercer)
3. "A Nightingale Sang in Berkeley Square" (Eric Maschwitz, Manning Sherwin)
4. "Mister Meadowlark" (Walter Donaldson, Johnny Mercer)
5. "Bye Bye Blackbird" (Ray Henderson, Mort Dixon, Gene Austin)
6. "Flamingo" (Ted Grouya, Edmund Anderson)
7. "Eagle and Me" (Harold Arlen, E.Y. Harburg)
8. "Baltimore Oriole" (Hoagy Carmichael, Paul Francis Webster)
9. "When the Red, Red Robin (Comes Bob, Bob, Bobbin' Along)" (Harry Woods)
10. "Chicken Today and Feathers Tomorrow" (Johnny Marks)
11. "When the Swallows Come Back to Capistrano" (Leon René)
12. "His Eye Is on the Sparrow" (Civilla D. Martin, Charles H. Gabriel)

== Personnel ==
- Carmen McRae – vocals
- Ralph Burns – arranger, conductor
- Ben Webster as "a tenorman" – tenor saxophone
- Al Cohn – tenor saxophone (2, 7–10, 12)
- Marky Markowitz – trumpet
- Dick Berg, Donald Corrado, Fred Klein and Tony Miranda – French horn (1, 3–6, 11)
- Don Abney – piano
- Mundell Lowe or Barry Galbraith (2, 8, 12) – guitar
- Aaron Bell – double bass
- Ted Sommer, Don Lamond (2, 8, 10) or Nick Stabulas (7, 9, 12) – drums
- Ray Charles – choral arrangements (12)
