= Soul° Cello =

Studio album by Fred Katz and His Music
- Released: 1958
- Recorded: January 15 & 22, 1958; Decca Studios, Hollywood, CA
- Genre: Jazz
- Label: Decca DL 9202
- Producer: Fred Katz

Fred Katz chronology
Zen: The Music of Fred Katz (1956)	Soul° Cello (1958)	4-5-6 Trio (1958)

Soul° Cello (subtitled Modern Jazz Arrangements for Cello and Orchestra) is an album by Fred Katz originally released on Decca in 1958.

== Reception ==
Professional ratings
Review scores
Source	Rating
Allmusic	4/5 stars

Allmusic gave the album 4 stars.

== Track listing ==
All compositions by Fred Katz except as indicated

1. "Country Gardens" (Percy Grainger) - 2:46
2. "Satori" - 3:44
3. "Andante" (Luther Henderson) - 2:36
4. "Circus" (Lou Alter, Bob Russell) - 3:20
5. "Wayfaring Stranger" (Traditional) - 2:30
6. "Time After Time" (Jule Styne, Sammy Cahn) - 3:51
7. "The Vidiot" - 2:05
8. "Lament of the Oracles" - 3:49
9. "I'm Glad There Is You" (Jimmy Dorsey, Paul Madeira) - 3:09
10. "The Toy That Never Was" - 3:33
11. "Intermezzo" (Heinz Prevost) - 2:52
12. "Come with Me" (William Marx) - 2:50

== Personnel ==
- Fred Katz - cello
- Paul Horn - flute, clarinet, alto saxophone (tracks 1, 4-7 & 11)
- Buddy Collette - alto saxophone (tracks 1, 4-7 & 11)
- Bill Green, Harry Klee - flute (tracks 1, 4-7 & 11)
- Calvin Jackson - piano
- Ann Stockton - harp
- John Pisano - guitar
- Hal Gaylor - bass
- Chico Hamilton - drums
