= 4-5-6 Trio =

Studio album by Fred Katz Hal Gaylor & Johnny Pisano
- Released: 1959
- Recorded: May 26, 1958; Decca Studios, Hollywood, CA
- Genre: Jazz
- Label: Decca DL 9213
- Producer: Fred Katz

Fred Katz chronology
Soul° Cello (1958)	4-5-6 Trio (1959)	Folk Songs for Far Out Folk (1958)

4-5-6 Trio (subtitled Mood Jazz in Hi Fi) is an album by Fred Katz originally released on Decca in 1959.

== Reception ==
Professional ratings
Review scores
Source	Rating
Allmusic	3/5 stars

Allmusic gave the album 3 stars.

== Track listing ==
1. "Four, Five, Six" (John Pisano) – 3:46
2. "Sophisticated Lady" (Duke Ellington, Mitchell Parish, Irving Mills) – 4:15
3. "Isn't It Romantic?" (Richard Rodgers, Lorenz Hart) – 2:39
4. "Delia" (Hal Gaylor) – 4:41
5. "Like Someone in Love" (Johnny Burke, Jimmy Van Heusen) – 2:49
6. "Krelch" (Gaylor) – 3:24
7. "Mountain Air" (Fred Katz) – 3:21
8. "Perdido" (Juan Tizol) – 4:45
9. "I'm Getting Sentimental Over You" (Ned Washington, George Bassman) – 5:29

== Personnel ==
- Fred Katz – cello
- Johnny Pisano – guitar
- Hal Gaylor – bass
