= Plenty of Horn (Paul Horn album) =

Studio album by Paul Horn
- Released: 1958
- Recorded: April 10 & 23, 1958; Radio Recorders, Hollywood, CA
- Genre: Jazz
- Label: Dot DLP 9002
- Producer: Tom Mack

Paul Horn chronology
House of Horn (1957)	Plenty of Horn (1958)	Impressions! (1959)

Plenty of Horn is the second album by saxophonist Paul Horn, released on the Dot label in 1958.

== Reception ==
Professional ratings
Review scores
Source	Rating
Allmusic	3/5 stars

The Allmusic site awarded the album 3 stars stating: "Horn is in excellent form on the wide-ranging material which reflects the influence of Hamilton's chamber jazz approach but also contains some hard swinging".

== Track listing ==
All compositions by Paul Horn except as indicated

1. "Chloe" (Gus Kahn, Neil Moret) - 4:47
2. "A Parable" - 4:07
3. "Blues for Tom" - 3:57
4. "The Smith Family" (Fred Katz) - 2:42
5. "Romanze" (Katz) - 4:11
6. "Yesterdays" (Jerome Kern, Otto Harbach) - 4:06
7. "Moods for Horn" (Allyn Ferguson):
  1. "Effervescense" - 2:24
  2. "Reminescense" - 3:57
  3. "Exuberance" - 2:07
  4. "Ebullience" - 4:20
8. "Tellin' the Truth" (Billy Bean) - 3:33
- Recorded at Radio Recorders in Hollywood, CA on April 10, 1958 (tracks 1–6 & 8) and April 23, 1958 (track 7)

== Personnel ==
- Paul Horn - alto saxophone, flute, piccolo, alto flute, clarinet
- Fred Katz - cello, piano
- Larry Bunker - vibraphone, claves
- Billy Bean - guitar
- Red Mitchell - bass
- Shelly Manne - drums
- Ray Kramer - cello (tracks 1–6 & 8)
- Mongo Santamaria - congas (tracks 1–6 & 8)
- Ken Bright, Ed Leddy, Stu Williamson - trumpet (track 7)
- Vincent DeRosa, Dick Perissi - French horn (track 7)
- Red Callender - tuba (track 7)
