= Profile of a Jazz Musician =

Studio album by Paul Horn Quintet
- Released: 1962
- Recorded: August 15, 16 & 17, 1962; Los Angeles, CA
- Genre: Jazz
- Label: Columbia CL 1922
- Producer: Irving Townsend

Paul Horn chronology
| The Sound of Paul Horn (1961) | Profile of a Jazz Musician (1962) | Impressions of Cleopatra (1963) |

Profile of a Jazz Musician is an album by Paul Horn which was originally released on the Columbia label in 1962.

== Reception ==
Professional ratings
Review scores
| Source | Rating |
|---|---|
| Allmusic | 4/5 stars |

The Allmusic site awarded the album 4 stars calling it: "one of Horn's finer jazz dates".

== Track listing ==
All compositions by Paul Horn except as indicated

1. "Count Your Change" - 4:38
2. "Now Hear This" - 4:09
3. "Lazy Afternoon" (Jerome Moross, John Latouche) - 2:44
4. "What Now?" (Paul Moer) - 4:07
5. "Straight Ahead" (Moer) - 5:37
6. "Fun Time" (Neal Hefti) - 3:41
7. "Because We're Kids" (Friedrich Hollaender, Theodor Geisel) - 3:28
8. "Abstraction" - 12:02

== Personnel ==
- Paul Horn - alto saxophone, flute, clarinet
- Emil Richards - vibraphone
- Paul Moer - piano
- Victor Gaskin - bass
- Milt Turner - drums
