= The Sound of Paul Horn =

Studio album by Paul Horn Quintet
- Released: 1961
- Recorded: March 30, 1961; Los Angeles, CA
- Genre: Jazz
- Length: 45:18
- Label: Columbia CL 1677
- Producer: Irving Townsend

Paul Horn chronology
Something Blue (1960)	The Sound of Paul Horn (1961)	Profile of a Jazz Musician (1961)

The Sound of Paul Horn is an album by Paul Horn which was originally released on the Columbia label in 1961.

== Reception ==
Professional ratings
Review scores
Source	Rating
Allmusic	4/5 stars

The Allmusic site awarded the album 4 stars stating: "This sadly out-of-print Columbia LP features Paul Horn at the peak of his jazz powers. ...a fine jazz improviser who fell between cool jazz and hard bop".

== Track listing ==
All compositions by Paul Horn except as indicated

1. "Benny's Buns" - 2:57
2. "Without a Song" (Vincent Youmans, Billy Rose, Edward Eliscu) - 3:37
3. "Yazz Per Favore" (Emil Richards) - 4:30
4. "Mirage For Miles" - 11:50
5. "Short Politician" (Paul Moer) - 4:02
6. "My Funny Valentine" (Richard Rodgers, Lorenz Hart) - 5:15
7. "Blue on Blue" - 6:57
8. "Moer or Less" (Moer) - 4:05

== Personnel ==
- Paul Horn - alto saxophone, flute, clarinet
- Emil Richards - vibraphone
- Paul Moer - piano
- Jimmy Bond - bass
- Milt Turner - drums
