= Gary Burton & Keith Jarrett =

1971 studio album by Gary Burton & Keith Jarrett

Studio album by Gary Burton & Keith Jarrett
- Released: 1971
- Recorded: July 23, 1970
- Studio: A&R, New York City
- Genre: Jazz
- Label: Atlantic
- Producer: Joel Dorn

Gary Burton chronology
Good Vibes (1970)	Gary Burton & Keith Jarrett (1971)	Live in Tokyo (1971)

Keith Jarrett chronology
Somewhere Before (1969)	Gary Burton & Keith Jarrett (1971)	The Mourning of a Star (1971)

Gary Burton & Keith Jarrett is an album by vibraphonist Gary Burton and pianist Keith Jarrett with guitarist Sam Brown, bassist Steve Swallow and drummer Bill Goodwin, recorded in 1970 and released on the Atlantic label in 1971. Jarrett also plays soprano saxophone on this recording.

== Reception ==
The AllMusic review by Scott Yanow stated: "Elements of pop music, rock, country and the jazz avant-garde are used in the mixture of styles and the results are quite logical".

Professional ratings
Review scores
Source	Rating
AllMusic	4.5/5 stars
The Encyclopedia of Popular Music	3/5 stars
The Rolling Stone Jazz Record Guide	4/5 stars

== Original LP track listing ==
1. "Grow Your Own" (Keith Jarrett) - 4:54
2. "Moonchild/In Your Quiet Place" (Jarrett) - 7:23
3. "Como en Vietnam" (Steve Swallow) - 7:04
4. "Fortune Smiles" (Jarrett) - 8:31
5. "The Raven Speaks" (Jarrett) - 8:18

- Tracks 1–5 recorded at A&R Studios, New York, on July 23, 1970.

== CD bonus tracks (Throb) ==
The album is paired with Gary Burton's earlier album Throb on the Rhino CD (R2 71594 (US)/8122-71594-2 (Germany) 1994 reissue.

6. "Henniger Flats" (David Pritchard) - 4:24
7. "Turn of the Century" (Michael Gibbs) - 5:05
8. "Chickens" (Steve Swallow) - 2:27
9. "Arise Her Eyes" (Swallow) - 3:48
10. "Prime Time" (Jerry Hahn) - 4:03
11. "Throb" (Michael Gibbs) - 4:31
12. "Doin' the Pig" (Swallow) - 3:45
13. "Triple Portrait" (Gibbs) - 4:26
14. "Some Echoes" (Swallow) - 6:59

- Tracks 6–14 recorded at Atlantic Studios, New York, on June 2–5, 1969.

== Personnel ==
- Keith Jarrett – piano, electric piano, soprano saxophone
- Gary Burton – vibraphone
- Sam Brown – guitar
- Steve Swallow – bass
- Bill Goodwin – drums
