= Something Blue (Paul Horn album) =

Studio album by Paul Horn Quintet
- Released: 1960
- Recorded: March 1960; Los Angeles, CA
- Genre: Jazz
- Length: 45:18
- Label: HiFi Jazz J 615
- Producer: David Axelrod

Paul Horn chronology
Impressions! (1959)	Something Blue (1960)	The Sound of Paul Horn (1961)

Something Blue is the fourth album by saxophonist Paul Horn which was originally released on the HiFi Jazz label in 1960.

== Reception ==
Professional ratings
Review scores
Source	Rating
Allmusic	4/5 stars

The Allmusic site awarded the album 4 stars stating: "All of the music is pretty episodic with tricky frameworks and some unusual time signatures being utilized. The results are generally stimulating if rarely all that relaxed".

== Track listing ==
All compositions by Paul Horn except as indicated

1. "Dun-Dunnee" - 7:13
2. "Tall Polynesian" (Paul Moer) - 8:13
3. "Mr. Bond" - 8:21
4. "Fremptz" (Emil Richards) - 6:03
5. "Something Blue" - 7:37
6. "Half and Half" - 7:51

== Personnel ==
- Paul Horn - alto saxophone, flute, clarinet
- Emil Richards - vibraphone
- Paul Moer - piano
- Jimmy Bond - bass
- Billy Higgins - drums
