= Beryl Vaughan =

American actress

Vaughan in a cast photo from Meet the Meeks

Beryl Vaughan (July 1, 1919 - April 26, 2016) was an American actress.

== Early years ==
Vaughan was born in Monmouthshire, Wales, the daughter of a father who was a draftsman and a mother who was a designer. She and her family came to the United States when she was 4 years old. Her interest in acting and a profession was ignited when she was 8 years old and received 25 cents for a recitation in a church play in St. Louis. When she was 11, she had a 26-week role on a radio serial, after which she "divided her time between radio and school". After she graduated from high school, she attended Wayne University in Detroit for two years before she began to devote more of her time to acting.

== Career ==
On Broadway, Vaughan portrayed Janey in Every Man for Himself (1940). She continued in the part for a 15,000-mile tour of the play. Her other acting on stage included having a role in a traveling troupe that performed Claudia.

Vaughn's performances on radio programs included the roles shown in the following table:

Partial List of Vaughan's Roles on Radio Programs
| Program | Role |
|---|---|
| Citizens of Tomorrow | Jerry |
| Helpmate | Holly |
| Ma Perkins | Jessica |
| Masquerade | Alice Summers |
| Meet the Meeks | Peggy Meek |
| Sky King | Penny |

She also was heard on Grand Marquee (09/10/1946 episode "Miss Livingstone, I Presume" and 01/23/1947 episode "Love is a Better Word") and Uncle Walter's Dog House. In addition to her acting, Vaughan was assistant director of the Detroit Children's Theater of the Air for 48 weeks, and she read commercials for the Lone Ranger.

The Chicago Press Photographers Association named Vaughan the "most photogenic radio star" in November 1942. The announcement was during the organization's exhibition of news photographs.

== Personal life ==
Vaughan married Ken Nordine, an actor and announcer on radio and television, in 1954. They had three sons and lived in a mansion in the Edgewater community of Chicago until her death.
