= Virtuoso Live! =

Live album by Joe Pass
- Released: 1991
- Recorded: September 13–15, 1990
- Venue: Vine Street Bar & Grill, Hollywood, California
- Genre: Jazz
- Length: 51:45
- Label: Pablo
- Producer: Eric Miller

Joe Pass chronology
Duets (1991)	Virtuoso Live! (1991)	Live at Yoshi's (1992)

Virtuoso Live! is a live album by jazz guitarist Joe Pass that was released in 1991. It was reissued in 1995 by Original Jazz Classics.

== Reception ==
Professional ratings
Review scores
Source	Rating
Allmusic	4/5 stars
The Penguin Guide to Jazz Recordings	3/4 stars

Writing for Allmusic, music critic Scott Yanow wrote of the album "Through it all, Pass shows that he is one of the few guitarists who never needed other instrumentalists in order to form a complete group sound. Recommended."

== Track listing ==
1. "Stompin' at the Savoy" (Edgar Sampson, Chick Webb, Benny Goodman, Andy Razaf) – 4:53
2. "Just the Way You Are" (Billy Joel) – 3:10
3. "Eric's Smoozie Blues" (Pass) – 5:10
4. "Beautiful Love" (Haven Gillespie, Wayne King, Egbert Van Alstyne, Victor Young) – 4:13
5. "Daquilo Que Eu Sei" (Ivan Lins, Vitor Martins) – 4:29
6. "In the Wee Small Hours of the Morning" (David Mann, Bob Hilliard) – 4:34
7. "Love for Sale" (Cole Porter) – 5:34
8. "Mack the Knife" (Bertolt Brecht, Kurt Weill, Marc Blitzstein) – 6:13
9. "So What's New?" (Peggy Lee, John Pisano) – 8:48
10. "(Back Home Again In) Indiana" (James Hanley, Ballard MacDonald) – 4:41

== Personnel ==
- Joe Pass – guitar
