= My Song (Joe Pass album) =

Studio album by Joe Pass
- Released: 1993
- Recorded: February 2–4, 1993
- Studio: Studio B, Plant Recording Studio, Sausalito, California
- Genre: Jazz
- Length: 61:55
- Label: Telarc
- Producer: Bob Edmondson

Joe Pass chronology
Live at Yoshi's (1992)	My Song (1993)	Songs for Ellen (1994)

My Song is an album by jazz guitarist Joe Pass that was released in 1993.

== Reception ==
Professional ratings
Review scores
Source	Rating
Allmusic	4/5 stars
The Penguin Guide to Jazz Recordings	3/4 stars

Writing for Allmusic, music critic Scott Yanow wrote of the album "Pass naturally emerges as the main star, interpreting nine standards and two of his originals with taste, hard-driving swing, and creativity within the bop tradition. Pass made so many recordings during the 20 years preceding this date that it is difficult to call any one of them "definitive," but this is an excellent group effort."

== Track listing ==
1. "Rockin' in Rhythm" (Duke Ellington, Irving Mills, Harry Carney) – 6:00
2. "Azure" (Ellington, Mills) – 7:17
3. "Keepin' Out of Mischief Now" (Fats Waller, Andy Razaf) – 7:39
4. "Ah Moore" (Al Cohn) – 4:08
5. "I Can't Kick" (Tom Ranier) – 6:11
6. "Rockin' Chair" (Hoagy Carmichael) – 3:52
7. "Song for Ellen" (Joe Pass) – 3:23
8. "Jitterbug Waltz" (Waller, Richard Maltby, Jr.) – 8:06
9. "The Duke" (Dave Brubeck) – 5:42
10. "Jo-Wes" (John Pisano) – 3:25
11. "Ain't Misbehavin''" (Harry Brooks, Razaf, Waller) – 6:12

== Personnel ==
- Joe Pass – guitar
- John Pisano – guitar
- Jim Hughart – bass
- Colin Bailey – drums
- Tom Ranier – saxophone, piano, clarinet
