= House of Horn =

Studio album by Paul Horn
- Released: 1957
- Recorded: September 27 & 30, 1957
- Studios: Radio Recorders, Hollywood, CA
- Genre: Jazz
- Label: Dot DLP 3091
- Producer: Tom Mack

Paul Horn chronology
House of Horn (1957)	Plenty of Horn (1958)

House of Horn is the debut album by saxophonist Paul Horn which was released on the Dot label in 1957.

== Reception ==
Professional ratings
Review scores
Source	Rating
Allmusic	3/5 stars

The Allmusic site rated the album 3 stars.

== Track listing ==
All compositions by Paul Horn except as indicated

1. "Pony Tale" - 2:55
2. "Day by Day" (Axel Stordahl, Paul Weston, Sammy Cahn) - 4:36
3. "A Soldier's Dream" (Allyn Ferguson) - 3:39
4. "House of Horn" - 3:30
5. "The Golden Princess" (Fred Katz) - 3:31
6. "Sunday, Monday, or Always" (Jimmy Van Heusen Johnny Burke) - 3:53
7. "To a Little Boy" - 4:07
8. "Siddartha" (Katz) - 5:47
9. "Interlude" (Pete Rugolo) - 4:26
- recorded at Radio Recorders in Hollywood, CA on September 27, 1957 (tracks 2, 3, 7 & 8) and September 30, 1957 (tracks 1, 4-6 & 9)

== Personnel ==
- Paul Horn - alto saxophone, flute, piccolo, clarinet
- Fred Katz - cello, piano
- Larry Bunker - vibraphone
- Gerald Wiggins - piano, celeste
- John Pisano - guitar
- Red Mitchell - bass
- Chico Hamilton as "Forest Thorn" - drums
- David Frisina, Dan Lube - violin (tracks 2–3, 7–8)
- David Sterkin - viola (2–3, 7–8)
- Bill Marx - bells (track 5)
- Allyn Ferguson, Pete Rugolo - arranger
