= Appassionato (album) =

Studio album by Joe Pass
- Released: 1991
- Recorded: August 9–11, 1990
- Studio: Group IV Recording Studios, Hollywood
- Genre: Jazz
- Length: 56:18
- Label: Pablo
- Producer: Eric Miller

Joe Pass chronology
| Summer Nights (1989) | Appassionato (1991) | Duets (1991) |

Appassionato is an album by American jazz guitarist Joe Pass that was released in 1991.

== Reception ==
Professional ratings
Review scores
| Source | Rating |
|---|---|
| Allmusic | 4/5 stars |
| The Penguin Guide to Jazz Recordings | 3/4 stars |

Writing for Allmusic, music critic Scott Yanow wrote of the album "Alternating romps with ballads, Pass is in typically fine form throughout with "Relaxin' at Camarillo," "Red Door" and "That's Earl, Brother" receiving rare revivals. This CD is one of literally dozens of worthy Joe Pass Pablo recordings."

== Track listing ==
1. "Relaxin' at Camarillo" (Charlie Parker) – 4:54
2. "Grooveyard" (Carl Perkins) – 5:40
3. "Body and Soul" (Edward Heyman, Robert Sour, Frank Eyton, Johnny Green) – 4:57
4. "Nica's Dream" (Horace Silver) – 4:49
5. "Tenderly" (Walter Gross, Jack Lawrence) – 5:06
6. "When It's Sleepy Time Down South" (Clarence Muse, Leon René, Otis Rene) – 1:59
7. "Red Door" (Gerry Mulligan, Zoot Sims) – 4:50
8. "Gee Baby, Ain't I Good to You" (Andy Razaf, Don Redman) – 3:55
9. "Lil' Darlin'" (Neal Hefti) – 5:37
10. "That's Earl, Brother" (Ray Brown, Gil Fuller, Dizzy Gillespie) – 4:12
11. "Stuffy" (Coleman Hawkins) – 4:32
12. "You're Driving Me Crazy" (Walter Donaldson) – 6:06

== Personnel ==
- Joe Pass – guitar
- John Pisano – guitar
- Jim Hughart – bass
- Colin Bailey – drums
