= You Were Meant for Me (Arthur Freed and Nacio Herb Brown song) =

1929 song

- Sheet music, 1929

Song
- Written: Nacio Herb Brown
- Published: 1929 by Robbins Music
- Lyricist: Arthur Freed

"You Were Meant for Me" is a popular American song with music by Nacio Herb Brown and lyrics by Arthur Freed, published in 1929.

It was introduced by Charles King in the 1929 musical film The Broadway Melody. It was also sung by King dubbing for Conrad Nagel in the feature film The Hollywood Revue of 1929 and performed by Bull Montana and Winnie Lightner in the film The Show of Shows also in 1929. Later, the song was performed by Frank Morgan in the 1940 musical film Hullabaloo and was included in Penny Serenade (1941, with Irene Dunne and Cary Grant). Gene Kelly sang the song and danced to it with Debbie Reynolds in the 1952 musical film Singin' in the Rain.

== Recorded versions ==
- Joe Pass and John Pisano's album Duets (1991)
- Ray Anthony
- Walt Roesner and the Capitolians (1929)
- Perry Como
- Bing Crosby included the song in a medley on his album Join Bing and Sing Along (1959)
- Maurice Chevalier
- Billy Daniels
- Helen Forrest
- The Four Lads
- Jackie Gleason
- Coleman Hawkins
- Dick Jurgens
- Gene Kelly
- Ben Berlin Orchestra
- Charles King recorded in Hollywood on April 11, 1929, and released on Victor 21965.
  as performed by Conrad Nagel with Anita Page in the movie The Hollywood Revue
- Meade "Lux" Lewis
- Gordon MacRae recorded on December 16, 1947, and released on Capitol 15027.
- Audra McDonald
- Rose Murphy
- Nat Pierce
- Eileen Rodgers
- Nat Shilkret and his Victor Orchestra
- Claude Thornhill and his orchestra
- Art Van Damme
- Paul Weston and his orchestra
- Carlos Gardel (04/06/1930) Spanish version: Enrique Cadícamo
- Sting, for the soundtrack of the 1998 film The Object of My Affection
