= Son of Word Jazz =

Album by Ken Nordine

Studio album by Ken Nordine with the Fred Katz Group
- Released: 1958
- Recorded: 1957
- Genre: Jazz
- Length: 33:47
- Label: Dot DLP 3096
- Producer: Tom Mack

Ken Nordine chronology
| Word Jazz (1957) | Son of Word Jazz (1958) | Love Words (1958) |

Son of Word Jazz is the second album by voice-over and recording artist Ken Nordine with the Fred Katz Group which was released on the Dot label in 1958.

== Reception ==
Professional ratings
Review scores
| Source | Rating |
|---|---|
| Allmusic | 3/5 stars |

The Allmusic site rated the album 3 stars stating "There doesn't seem to be as much thought put into the sequel; though a number of moments are every bit as good as the material found on the first album, there's also a lot more meandering this time around, and some real puzzlers".

== Track listing ==
All compositions by Ken Nordine and Fred Katz.

| No. | Title | Length |
|---|---|---|
| 1. | "The Smith Family" | 1:59 |
| 2. | "Miss Cone" | 2:43 |
| 3. | "Outer Space" | 3:37 |
| 4. | "Down the Drain" | 3:12 |
| 5. | "Secretary" | 3:01 |
| 6. | "Bubble Gum" | 2:36 |
| 7. | "Looking at Numbers" | 2:21 |
| 8. | "Anytime, Anytime" | 2:20 |
| 9. | "I Used to Think My Right Hand Was Uglier Than My Left" | 2:15 |
| 10. | "Lemming" | 2:18 |
| 11. | "The Bullfighter" | 2:50 |
| 12. | "Junk Man" | 4:35 |
| Total length: | | 33:47 |

== Personnel ==
- Ken Nordine – narration
- Fred Katz – cello
- Paul Horn – woodwinds
- John Pisano – guitar
- Richard Marx – piano
- Harold Gaylor – bass
- Red Holt – drums
