= Joe's Blues (Joe Pass album) =

Studio album by Joe Pass
- Released: July 21, 1998
- Recorded: 1968 at Radio Recorders, Hollywood, CA
- Genre: Jazz
- Length: 33:32
- Label: Laserlight

Joe Pass chronology
Roy Clark & Joe Pass Play Hank Williams (1994)	Joe's Blues (1998)	Unforgettable (1998)

Joe's Blues is an album by American jazz guitarist Joe Pass, recorded in 1968 and released posthumously in 1998 (see 1998 in music).

The tracks for Joe's Blues were originally recorded in 1968 before Pass' later sessions with Herb Ellis that produced Seven, Come Eleven and Two for the Road.

The listed bassist and drummer are disputed.

== Reception ==
Professional ratings
Review scores
Source	Rating
Allmusic	4/5 stars

Writing for Allmusic, music critic Robert Taylor wrote of Pass "His playing is bursting with energy and is a fine preview of what was to come during the next three decades."

== Track listing ==
1. "Alexander's Ragtime Band" (Irving Berlin) – 3:27
2. "Look for the Silver Lining" (Jerome Kern, Buddy DeSylva) – 3:43
3. "Joe's Blues" (Joe Pass) – 3:28
4. "Georgia" (Hoagy Carmichael, Stuart Gorrell) – 6:28
5. "When You're Smiling" (Shay, Fisher, and Goodwin) – 3:35
6. "The Shadow of Your Smile" (Johnny Mandel, Paul Francis Webster) – 2:37
7. "What Have They Done to My Song, Ma" (Melanie Safka) – 3:35
8. "You Stepped Out of a Dream" (Herb Nacio Brown, Gus Kahn) – 1:44
9. "Sweet Georgia Brown" (Ben Bernie, Maceo Pinkard, Kenneth Casey) – 4:55

== Personnel ==
- Joe Pass – guitar
- Herb Ellis – guitar on "The Shadow of Your Smile" and "You Stepped Out of a Dream"
- [ Colin Bailey – drums ] listed but wrong.
- [Monty Budwig – bass] listed but wrong.
- Adam Ross – liner notes
