= Live at Yoshi's (Joe Pass album) =

1992 live album by Joe Pass

Live album by Joe Pass
- Released: 1992
- Recorded: January 30 – February 1, 1992
- Venue: Yoshi's, Oakland, California
- Genre: Jazz
- Length: 47:15
- Label: Pablo
- Producer: Eric Miller

Joe Pass chronology
Virtuoso Live! (1991)	Live at Yoshi's (1992)	My Song (1993)

Live at Yoshi's is a live album by jazz guitarist Joe Pass that was released in 1992.

== Reception ==
Professional ratings
Review scores
Source	Rating
Allmusic	4.5/5 stars
The Penguin Guide to Jazz Recordings	3/4 stars

Writing for Allmusic, music critic Les Line said of the album: "It's one of the best of the many Joe Pass albums."

== Track listing ==
1. "Doxy" (Sonny Rollins) – 6:00
2. "The Breeze and I" (Ernesto Lecuona, Al Stillman) – 4:23
3. "Blues for Monty" (Joe Pass) – 6:25
4. "You Were Meant for Me" (John Pisano) – 6:22
5. "Swingin' Till the Girls Come Home" (Oscar Pettiford) – 4:40
6. "I Thought About You" (Johnny Mercer, Jimmy Van Heusen) – 4:36
7. "Alone Together" (Howard Dietz, Arthur Schwartz) – 5:59
8. "Good Bait" (Count Basie, Tadd Dameron) – 5:16
9. "Oleo" (Rollins) – 5:32
10. "The Song Is You" (Oscar Hammerstein II, Jerome Kern) – 6:20

== Personnel ==
- Joe Pass – guitar
- John Pisano – guitar
- Monty Budwig – bass
- Colin Bailey – drums
