= Word Jazz =

Album by Ken Nordine

Studio album by Ken Nordine with the Fred Katz Group
- Released: 1957
- Recorded: July 1957
- Studio: Chicago, IL
- Genre: Jazz
- Length: 39:50
- Label: Dot
- Producer: Tom Mack

Ken Nordine chronology
Passion in the Desert (1955)	Word Jazz (1957)	Son of Word Jazz (1957)

Word Jazz is the debut album by voice-over and recording artist Ken Nordine with the Fred Katz Group which was released on the Dot label in 1957.

== Reception ==
Professional ratings
Review scores
Source	Rating
Allmusic	4.5/5 stars

The Allmusic site rated the album 4 1/2 stars stating "the combination sounds not unlike a radio announcer performing beat poetry in places...mostly because that's exactly what it is. That would be selling this album short, though, because Nordine proves himself more than capable of providing both the smooth vocal tones as well as the truly twisted creative sense necessary to pull this off... Word Jazz is still an innovative album and definitely worthy of the sequels that followed."

== Track listing ==
All compositions by Ken Nordine and Fred Katz.

No.	Title	Length
1.	"What Time Is It?"	3:48
2.	"My Baby"	2:36
3.	"Sound Museum"	7:09
4.	"The Vidiot"	5:30
5.	"Roger"	5:05
6.	"Hunger Is From"	3:47
7.	"Looks Like It's Going to Rain"	3:27
8.	"Flibberty Jib"	4:42
Total length:		36:04

== Personnel ==
- Ken Nordine – narration
- Fred Katz – cello
- Paul Horn – saxophone, flute, piccolo, clarinet
- John Pisano as "John Asano" – guitar
- Richard Marx – piano
- Jimmy Bond – bass
- Chico Hamilton as "Forest Horn" – drums, bongos, timpani, gong
- Jim Cunningham – sound patterns
