= Paul Horn (musician) =

American flautist, saxophonist, and composer (1930–2014)

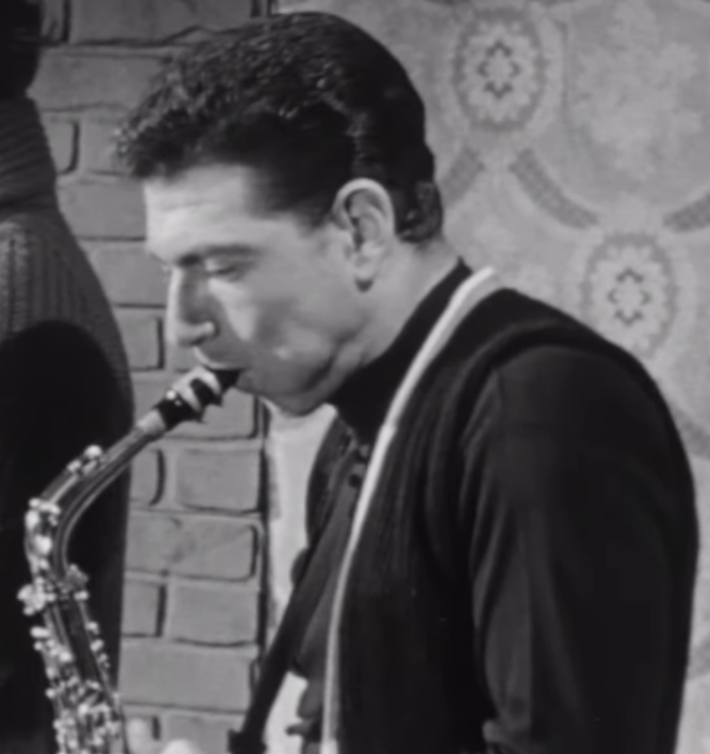
- Horn in A Bucket of Blood, 1959

Background information
- Born: March 17, 1930; New York City, U.S.
- Died: June 29, 2014 (aged 84) Vancouver, British Columbia, Canada
- Genres: Jazz; new age; ambient
- Occupations: Musician; composer; producer
- Instruments: Flute; clarinet; saxophone
- Labels: Dot; World Pacific; Columbia; Epic
- Formerly of: R. Carlos Nakai
- Website: www.paulhornmusic.com

Paul Horn (March 17, 1930 – June 29, 2014) was an American flautist, saxophonist, composer and producer. He became a pioneer of world and new age music with his 1969 album Inside. He received five Grammy nominations between 1965 and 1999, including three nominations in 1965.

== Biography ==
Horn was born on March 17, 1930, in New York City and had Jewish ancestry through his father. The family moved to Washington, D.C., when Horn was four. He took up the piano at age four, followed by the clarinet at 12. While in Washington, D.C., Horn attended Theodore Roosevelt High School and the Washington College of Music. In the summer of 1942, Horn worked as an usher at the Earl Theatre to buy a clarinet. He studied the clarinet and flute at the Oberlin Conservatory of Music in Ohio, earning a bachelor's degree. In June 1953, Horn gained a master's from the Manhattan School of Music.

Moving to Los Angeles, he played with Chico Hamilton's quintet from 1956 to 1958 and became an established West Coast session player. He played on the Duke Ellington Orchestra's Suite Thursday and worked with Nat King Cole, Tony Bennett and others. He scored the 1959 animated television series Clutch Cargo. During the same year he appeared briefly in Roger Corman's film A Bucket of Blood.

In 1960, Horn recorded for Fantasy Records with Latin Jazz vibraphonist Cal Tjader (with drummers Willie Bobo and Mongo Santamaria) for the album Latino!, released in 1962. He appears playing with his band in the opening scene at the jazz club in Curtis Harrington's 1961 film Night Tide.

Horn's Quintet produced jazz albums for Columbia and RCA Victor up until 1966. During this period, he was the subject of a David Wolper television documentary Portrait of a Jazz Musician.

Horn became a practitioner of transcendental meditation. He attended training at the Maharishi Mahesh Yogi's ashram along with The Beatles on their 1968 trip to India. Following his experiences in India, Horn's recordings moved from jazz to world and new-age music.

In 1955, Horn married his first wife, Lilian Yvonne Jourdan. By 1959, the marriage had started to fall apart, and their divorce was finalised a few years later. In 1970, he moved with his two sons Marlen and Robin from his marriage, and second wife Tryntje Baum to Victoria, British Columbia, on Vancouver Island. He formed his own quintet and recorded film scores for the National Film Board of Canada.

While well practiced as a jazz musician, many of his works defy such categorization. As well as the Inside series, he recorded other albums of jazz with musicians from a range of cultures and backgrounds, including China and Africa.

He lived in British Columbia and Arizona. He was last married to the Canadian singer and songwriter Ann Mortifee. Horn died at the age of 84 on June 29, 2014.

== Discography ==
=== As leader ===
- House of Horn (Dot, 1957)
- Plenty of Horn (Dot, 1958)
- Impressions! (World Pacific, 1959)
- Something Blue (HiFi Jazz, 1960)
- The Sound of Paul Horn (Columbia, 1961)
- Profile of a Jazz Musician (Columbia, 1962)
- Impressions of Cleopatra (Columbia, 1963)
- Jazz Suite on the Mass Texts (RCA Victor, 1964) written, arranged and conducted by Lalo Schifrin
- Cycle (RCA Victor, 1965)
- Here's That Rainy Day (RCA Victor, 1966)
- Monday, Monday (RCA Victor, 1966) arranged and conducted by Oliver Nelson
- Paul Horn in India (1967, World Pacific), composed and adapted by Paul Horn, Ravi Shankar and Allaudin Kahn
- Paul Horn in Kashmir (1967, World Pacific)
- Inside (1969, Epic) (also known later as Inside the Taj Mahal)
- Paul Horn and the Concert Ensemble (1970, Ovation Records)
- Inside II, (1972, Epic)
- Visions (1974, Epic)
- Altura Do Sol (High Sun)/The Altitude of the Sun (1975, Epic), composed and accompanied by Egberto Gismonti
- Special Edition (1975, Mushroom Records)
- Nexus (1975, Epic)
- Inside the Great Pyramid (1976)
- Dream Machine (1978, Mushroom Records), composed, arranged and conducted by Lalo Schifrin
- Riviera Concert (1980)
- China (1981, Golden Flute Records), with David M.Y. Liang, cheng, sheng, and erh-hu
- Inside the Magic of Findhorn (1983), with Joel Andrews, harpist
- Inside the Cathedral (1983)
- Jupiter 8 (1983, Golden Flute Records), with Ralph Dyck, synthesizer
- Paul Horn in Concert (1984, Golden Flute Music), with David Friesen, Oregon bass, and Ralph Hooper, organ
- Connections (1984, Gramavision), with Steven Halpern
- Traveler (1985)
- Sketches: A Collection, selections from the Golden Flute series (1986) (Lost Lake Arts/Windham Hill)
- The Peace Album (1988) – music for Christmas
- Brazilian Images (1989)
- Inside the Taj Mahal, Volume 2 (1989)
- Nomad (1990)
- Africa (1994)
- Music (1997)
- Inside Canyon de Chelly (1997) – with R. Carlos Nakai
- Inside Monument Valley (1999) – with Nakai
- Tibet: Journey to the Roof of the World (2000)
- Imprompture (2001)
- Journey Inside Tibet (2001)

=== As sideman ===
With Mongo Santamaria

- Mongo (Fantasy, 1959)

With Cal Tjader

- In a Latin Bag (Verve, 1961)
- Latino! (Fantasy 1962; re-released 1992)

With Lorez Alexandria

- More of the Great Lorez Alexandria (Impulse!, 1964)

With Nat King Cole

- L-O-V-E (Capitol, 1965)

With Buddy Collette

- Buddy Collette's Swinging Shepherds (EmArcy, 1958)
- At the Cinema! (Mercury, 1959)

With Duke Ellington

- Swinging Suites by Edward E. and Edward G. (Columbia, 1960)

With Chico Hamilton

- Chico Hamilton Quintet (Pacific Jazz, 1957)
- Sweet Smell of Success (Decca, 1957)
- South Pacific in Hi-Fi (World Pacific, 1958)
- Ellington Suite (World Pacific, 1959)
- The Three Faces of Chico (Warner Bros., 1959)

With Fred Katz

- Zen: The Music of Fred Katz (Pacific Jazz, 1957)
- Soul° Cello (Decca, 1958)
- Folk Songs for Far Out Folk (Warner Bros., 1958)

With Shelly Manne

- My Fair Lady with the Un-original Cast (Capitol, 1964)

With Ken Nordine

- Word Jazz (Dot, 1957)
- Son of Word Jazz (Dot, 1958)

With Shorty Rogers

- Chances Are It Swings (RCA Victor, 1958)
- An Invisible Orchard (RCA Victor, 1961 [1997])
- The Fourth Dimension in Sound (Warner Bros., 1961)
- Bossa Nova (Reprise, 1962)
- Jazz Waltz (Reprise, 1962)

With Pete Rugolo

- The Music from Richard Diamond (EmArcy, 1959)
- Behind Brigitte Bardot (Warner Bros., 1960)

With Lalo Schifrin

- Gone with the Wave (Colpix, 1964)

With George Shearing

- Out of the Woods (Capitol, 1965 [1963])

With The Beach Boys

- Pet Sounds (Capitol, 1966)

With Joni Mitchell

- Ladies of the Canyon (Reprise, 1970)

== Filmography ==
- Sweet Smell of Success (1957) (with the Chico Hamilton Quintet)
- A Bucket of Blood (1959) (saxophone solo intro)
- The Rat Race (1960) (musician)
- The New Three Stooges (1965) (main title and end credits theme)
