= Calvin Jackson (pianist) =

American pianist, composer, and bandleader

- Born: May 26, 1919; Philadelphia, Pennsylvania
- Died: December 9, 1985 (aged 66) Encinitas, California
- Genres: Jazz
- Occupations: Pianist, composer, and bandleader

John Calvin Jackson (May 26, 1919 – December 9, 1985) was an American jazz pianist, composer, and bandleader.

== Background ==
He was born in Philadelphia in 1919 to Harry and Margaret Jackson. His mother was a concert singer in Philadelphia. Jackson played piano from childhood, having lessons with private teacher. He studied at Juilliard and New York University.

== Career ==
At the beginning of his career Jackson worked with Frankie Fairfax. From 1943–47 he worked in Hollywood as an assistant director of music for MGM on productions including Meet Me in St. Louis and Anchors Aweigh.

In 1947 he recorded with Phil Moore and also as a solo pianist for Discovery Records. He played Liszt's Hungarian Rhapsody No. 2 on piano for the 1947 Tom and Jerry cartoon The Cat Concerto. In Summer 1948, he played with a singer Mildred Bailey and a dancer Avon Long at Café Society in New York City. In 1950, he moved to Toronto, where he often played on television and radio. Over the course of the 1950s and early 1960s he released several LPs for labels such as Columbia Records.

In 1957 he returned to Los Angeles, where he resumed work as a composer and orchestrator for television and hit musicals like Where the Boys Are and The Unsinkable Molly Brown, which was Oscar-nominated for best adapted score. Occasionally he could be seen onscreen as a piano-playing character.

Jackson also arranged for Ray Charles at one point, receiving an arrangement and co-producer credit for Charles' 1964 release "Sweet & Sour Tears" (ABC-Paramount). By the early 1980s, he had moved to San Diego County, where he lived in semiretirement in the Point Loma neighborhood, giving music lessons on a piano in his apartment. In 1984 he sat in as a guest at the Sunday night jam sessions Jeannie and Jimmy Cheatham hosted at the Bahia resort on Mission Bay, playing piano and harmonica between sets and occasionally with the band.

== Death ==
He was working on arrangements for a 31-piece concert jazz orchestra in Point Loma when he developed a heart ailment and was taken to the hospital. He died on November 28, 1985, at age 66.

== Discography ==
- Calvin Jackson (Discovery, 1949)
- Calvin Jackson at the Plaza (Vik, 1954)
- Rave Notice (Columbia, 1955)
- The Calvin Jackson Quartet (Columbia, 1955)
- Jazz Variations on Gershwin's Rhapsody in Blue (Liberty, 1958)
- Cal-Essence/Calvin at the Piano (Raynote, 1959)
- Jazz Variations on Movie Themes (Reprise, 1961)
- Two Sides of Calvin Jackson (Reprise, 1961)

With Buddy Collette

- Nice Day with Buddy Collette (Contemporary, 1957)

With Fred Katz

- Soul° Cello (Decca, 1958)
