= Fred Katz (cellist) =

American jazz cellist and composer (1919–2013)

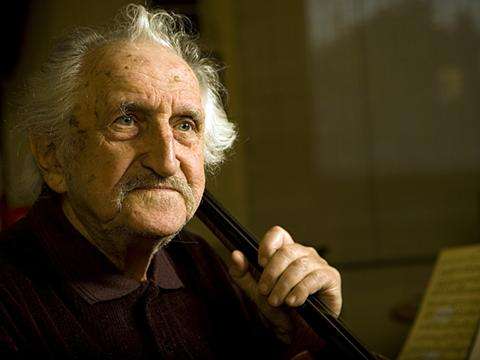
Fred Katz

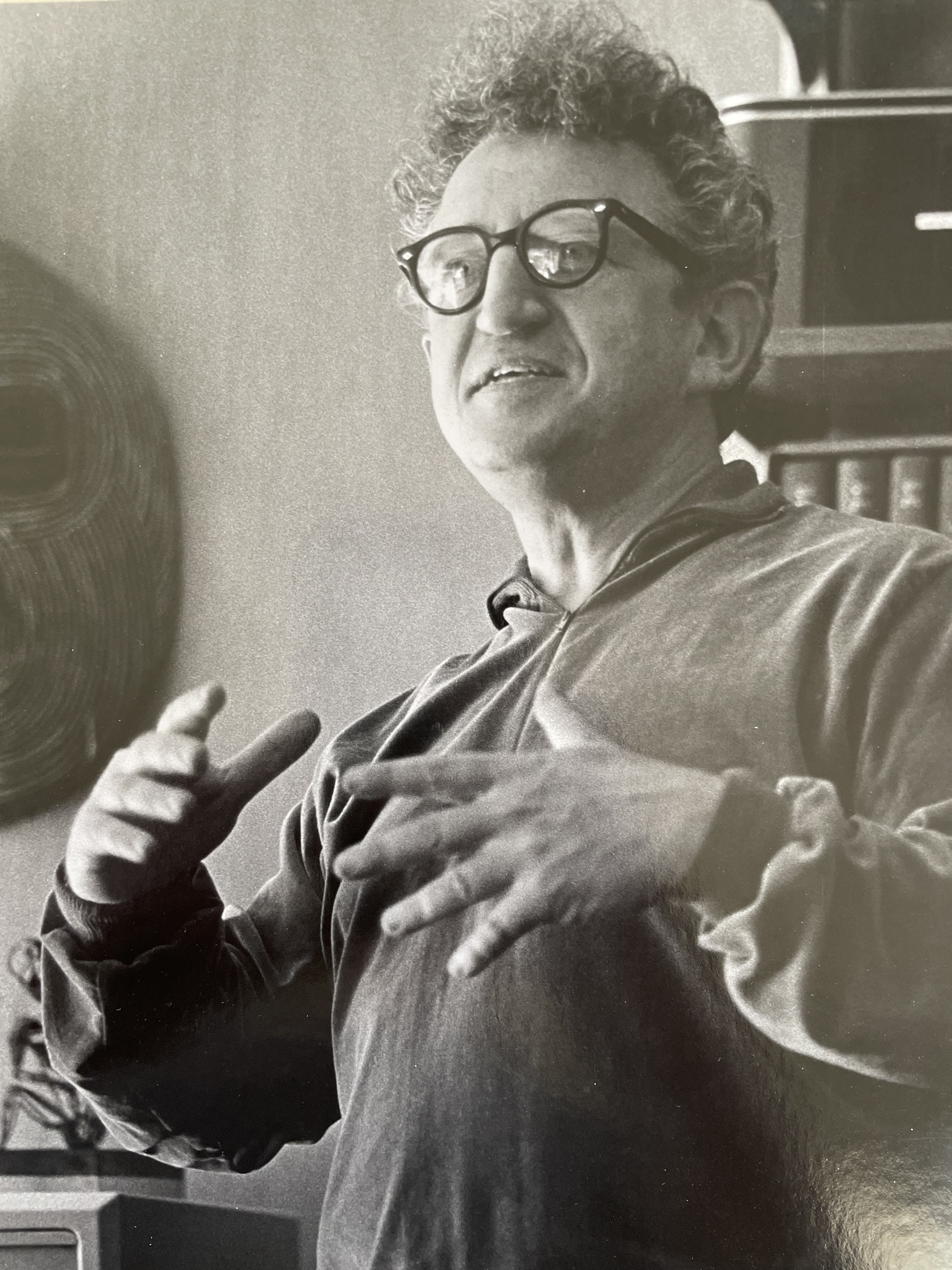

Frederick Katz (February 25, 1919 – September 7, 2013) was an American cellist and composer. He was among the earliest jazz musicians to establish the cello as a viable improvising solo instrument. Katz has been described in CODA magazine as "the first real jazz cellist."

== Biography ==
Born in the Williamsburg section of Brooklyn, New York City, Katz was classically trained and studied under Pablo Casals and performed with several symphony orchestras including the National Symphony Orchestra. He was a child prodigy on both the cello and piano and performed in public as a teenager, and was drawn to the music of Manhattan nightclubs and to folk music. In his youth, Katz was a member of the American Communist Party.

During World War II, he conducted concerts and wrote musical revues for the U.S. Seventh Army.

Katz is best known as a member of drummer Chico Hamilton's quintet, one of the most important West Coast jazz groups of the 1950s. Katz's arco cello defined the "chamber jazz" focus of Chico Hamilton's Quintet and the group quickly gained popularity. The Chico Hamilton Quintet, including Katz, appeared in the film Sweet Smell of Success (1957), starring Burt Lancaster and Tony Curtis. Katz and Hamilton wrote a score for the film which was ultimately rejected in favor of one by Elmer Bernstein.

Katz also recorded several albums as a leader. Another high point in Katz's career was writing and conducting the arrangements for singer Carmen McRae's album Carmen For Cool Ones, which was released in 1958.

One of his most recognizable pieces of music was his score for the film A Bucket of Blood (1959), directed by Roger Corman, as the music appeared in a total of seven Corman films, including The Wasp Woman (1959) and Creature from the Haunted Sea (1961). According to Mark Thomas McGee, author of Roger Corman: The Best of the Cheap Acts, each time Katz was called upon to write music for Corman, Katz sold the same score as if it were new music. Katz explained that his music for Corman's The Little Shop of Horrors was created by a music editor piecing together selections from other soundtracks that he had produced for Corman.

Later in his career, Katz became a professor of ethnic music in the Anthropology Department at California State University, Fullerton and California State University, Northridge, where he taught world music, anthropology, religion, and Jewish mysticism for over 30 years. He was a longtime Fullerton resident. One of his students was John Densmore, drummer of The Doors.

Katz died on September 7, 2013, in Santa Monica, California.

== Discography ==
=== As leader ===
- Zen: The Music of Fred Katz (Pacific Jazz, 1957) – rec. 1956
- Soul° Cello (Decca, 1958)
- 4-5-6 Trio (Decca, 1959) – rec. 1958
- Folk Songs for Far Out Folk (Warner Bros., 1959) – rec. 1958
- Fred Katz and his Jammers (Decca, 1959)

=== Film and television music ===
- Never Alone (1958)
- T Is for Tumbleweed (1958)
- A Bucket of Blood (1959)
- The Wasp Woman (1959)
- Ski Troop Attack (1960)
- Battle of Blood Island (1960)
- The Little Shop of Horrors (1960)
- Rebel in Paradise (1960)
- Johnny Staccato (1960)
- Creature from the Haunted Sea (1961)
- The Puppet's Dream (1961)
- Checkmate (1961)
- The Horizontal Lieutenant (1962)
- Leaf (1962)
- College (1962)
- The Sorcerer (1963)
- Quest for Freedom (1966)
- The Birth of Aphrodite (1971)
- The Life of Gauguin

=== As sideman ===
With Chico Hamilton

- Chico Hamilton Quintet featuring Buddy Collette (Pacific Jazz, 1956) – rec. 1955
- Chico Hamilton Quintet in Hi Fi (Pacific Jazz, 1956)
- Chico Hamilton Quintet (Pacific Jazz, 1957)
- Sweet Smell of Success (Decca, 1957)
- South Pacific in Hi-Fi (World Pacific, 1958)
- Ellington Suite (World Pacific, 1959)
- The Original Chico Hamilton Quintet (World Pacific, 1960)

With Paul Horn

- House of Horn (Dot, 1957)
- Plenty of Horn (Dot, 1958)

With Ken Nordine

- Word Jazz (Dot, 1957)
- Son of Word Jazz (Dot, 1957)
- Love Words (Dot, 1958)

With others

- Dorothy Ashby, The Rubaiyat of Dorothy Ashby (Cadet, 1970)
- Carmen McRae, Carmen for Cool Ones (Decca, 1958)
- Pete Rugolo, Behind Brigitte Bardot (Warner Bros., 1960)
