= Ken Nordine =

American voice-over and recording artist (1920–2019)

- Born: April 13, 1920; Cherokee, Iowa, U.S.
- Died: February 16, 2019 (aged 98); Chicago, Illinois, U.S.
- Occupations: Voice-over, radio host, musician
- Years active: 1948–2019
- Spouse: Beryl Vaughan
- Children: 3

Ken Nordine (April 13, 1920 – February 16, 2019) was an American voice-over and recording artist, best known for his series of Word Jazz albums. His deep, resonant voice has also been featured in many commercial advertisements and movie trailers. One critic wrote that "you may not know Ken Nordine by name or face, but you'll almost certainly recognize his voice."

== Life and career ==
The son of Theresia (Danielson) and Nore S. Nordine, a contractor, Ken Nordine was born in Cherokee, Iowa. His parents were Swedish. The family later moved to Chicago, where he attended Lane Technical College Prep High School and the University of Chicago. During the 1940s, he was heard on The World's Great Novels and other radio programs broadcast from Chicago, one of which, Honoré de Balzac's short story "Une passion dans le désert", was recorded for the 1955 album Passion in the Desert. In 1955, he provided the voiceover on Billy Vaughn's version of "Shifting Whispering Sands", which peaked at number 5 on the Billboard Hot 100. He subsequently attracted wider attention when he recorded aural vignettes on Word Jazz (Dot, 1957). Love Words, Son of Word Jazz (Dot, 1958) and his other albums in this vein feature Nordine's narration over cool jazz by the Fred Katz Group, featuring Chico Hamilton recording under an alias.

Nordine began performing and recording such albums at the peak of the Beat era and was associated with the poetry-and-jazz movement. However, it has been observed that some of Nordine's writings "are more akin to Franz Kafka or Edgar Allan Poe" than to the beats. Many of his word jazz tracks feature critiques of societal norms. Some are lightweight and humorous, while others reveal dark, paranoid undercurrents and bizarre, dream-like scenarios. Nordine's DVD, The Eye Is Never Filled, was released in 2007.

Nordine hosted the weekly Word Jazz program on WBEZ, also carried on other stations, from the 1970s for over forty years.

Nordine was in demand as a voiceover artist on commercials for several companies including the First Chicago Bank, Levi's, Gallo Wine and Magnavox amongst others.

In 1988, Nordine appeared on two selections from the album Stay Awake: Various Interpretations of Music from Vintage Disney Films: "Hi Diddle Dee Dee (An Actor's Life For Me)" from Pinocchio, and "Desolation Theme", also from Pinocchio.

In 1990, Nordine was approached by Jerry Garcia of The Grateful Dead to be the anchor for their New Year's Eve radio broadcast from Oakland, California. For the broadcast he recorded some improvisations with Garcia, drummer Mickey Hart and Egyptian musician Hamza El-Din. This subsequently led to an album Devout Catalyst, released on the Grateful Dead's own label in 1991 and Upper Limbo in 1993 and an appearance with the band live at a show at Rosemont, Illinois, in March 1993.

In 2007, he was a performer at the High Line Festival in New York, curated by David Bowie.

With his wife, the former Beryl Vaughan, an actress whom he married in 1945, he had three sons. Beryl died April 26, 2016. Ken Nordine died February 16, 2019.

== Films and television ==
Nordine appeared as the narrator, credited as "The Stranger", in Philip Kaufman's 1967 underground comedy Fearless Frank. He was also Linda Blair's vocal coach for her role in the 1973 film The Exorcist. Subsequently, Nordine filed a lawsuit, saying he was not properly compensated for his work, eventually settling in 1979.

Nordine narrated several films for classroom use, made by Coronet Instructional Films in the 1950s. In at least one, Developing Your Character, he appears on screen.

On television, Nordine did a series of readings on a show titled Faces in the Window on WNBQ, and Fred Astaire danced to Nordine's "My Baby" on a TV special. Nordine's past radio series were Now Nordine and Word Jazz. He also provided the opening narration for the music video of "Can You Feel It" by the Jacksons. In 1986, Nordine appeared on The Jay Leno Show (TV special) as the storyteller.

Nordine worked with author Maurice Sendak on Sesame Street, providing the narration for the animated segments "Bumble Ardy" and "Seven Monsters".

Nordine provided the voiceover for NewTek's Video Toaster demo reels, such as the 1991 "Revolution".

== Selected discography ==
- 1955 – Passion in the Desert (FM)
- 1957 – Word Jazz (Dot)
- 1958 – Son of Word Jazz (Dot)
- 1958 – Love Words (Dot)
- 1959 – Next! (Dot)
- 1960 – Word Jazz Vol. II (Dot)
- 1967 – Colors (Philips)
- 1967 – Ken Nordine Does Robert Shure: Twink (Philips)
- 1979 – Stare with Your Ears (Snail)
- 1984 – Triple Talk (Snail)
- 1986 – Grandson of Word Jazz (Snail)
- 1991 – Devout Catalyst (Grateful Dead)
- 1993 – Upper Limbo (Grateful Dead)
- 2001 – Transparent Mask (Asphodel)
- 2007 – The Eye Is Never Filled (DVD, Snail)

== Bibliography ==
- Marciniak, Vwadek P., Politics, Humor and the Counterculture: Laughter in the Age of Decay (New York etc., 2008).
- Stephenson, Gregory, Speaking Volumes: Ken Nordine's Word Jazz. (Heidelberg: Ober Limbo Verlag, 2019.)
