= 1959 in jazz =

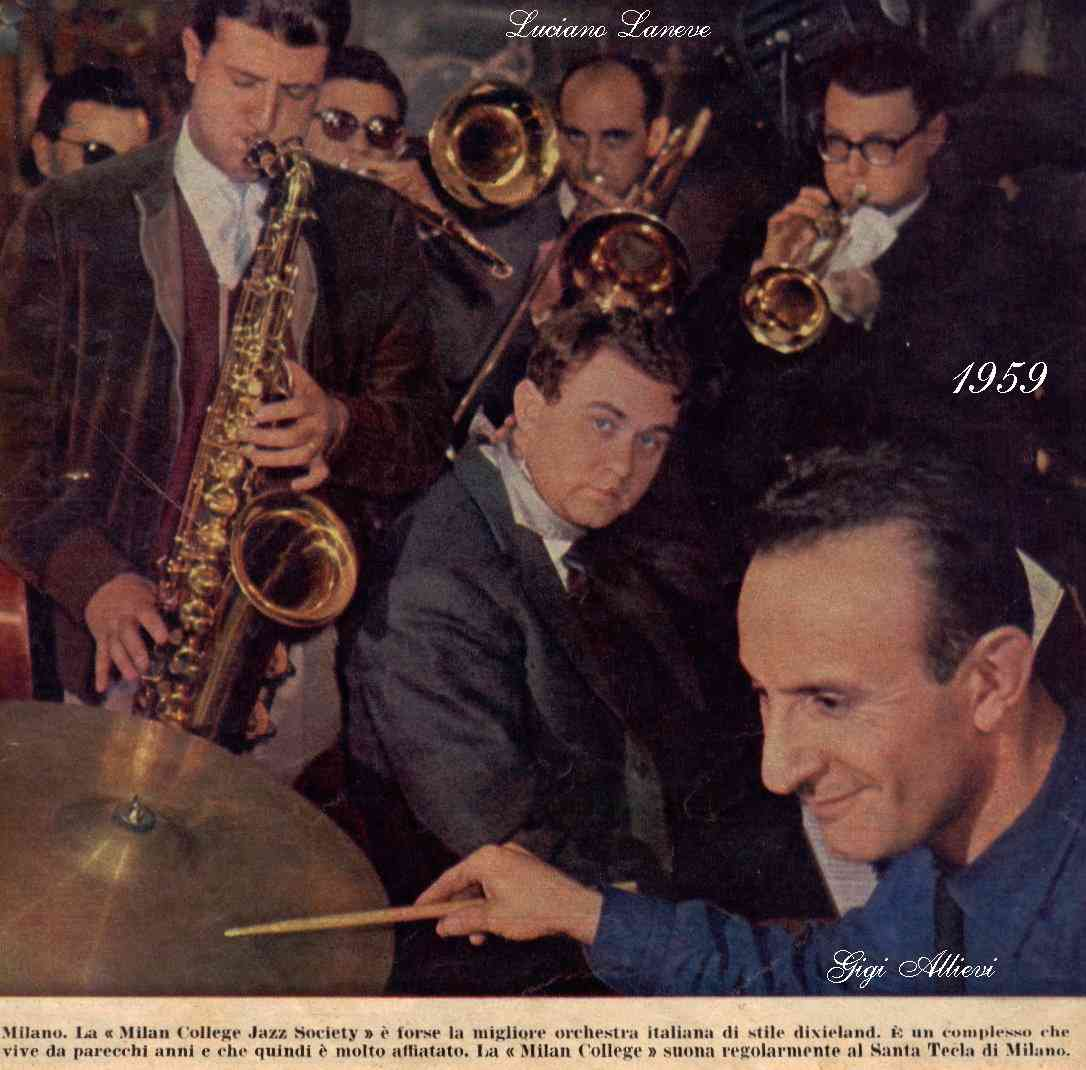
- The "Milan College Jazz Society"
- Decade: 1950s in jazz
- Music: 1959 in music
- Standards: List of post-1950 jazz standards
- See also: 1958 in jazz – 1960 in jazz

This is a timeline documenting events of Jazz in the year 1959.

== Events ==
- March 2 & April 22 – The recording sessions for the extremely influential Miles Davis jazz album Kind of Blue take place at the CBS 30th Street Studio in New York City. The album was released on August 17 in the United States, opening with Davis' "So What" and including the Davis-Bill Evans composition "Blue in Green." Regarding composition credit, the album states "All compositions by Miles Davis." Evans never challenged Davis' copyright, and Davis often acknowledged Evans' contributions to the sound of the album. Evans' liner notes for Kind of Blue state that "Miles conceived these settings only hours before the recording dates," although later Evans is reported to have been somewhat bitter about the lack of shared composition credit for "Blue in Green" and "Flamenco Sketches."

=== May ===
- 4 – 1st Annual Grammy Awards
  - Ella Fitzgerald awarded Best Vocal Performance, Female for the album Ella Fitzgerald Sings the Irving Berlin Songbook, and Best Jazz Performance, Individual for the album Ella Fitzgerald Sings the Duke Ellington Songbook.
  - Count Basie awarded Best Jazz Performance, Group and Best Performance by a Dance Band for the album Basie.
  - Billy May awarded Best Performance by an Orchestra for the album Billy May's Big Fat Brass.

=== July ===
- 2 – The 6th Newport Jazz Festival started in Newport, Rhode Island (July 2 – 5).

=== August ===
- 7-9 - Playboy Jazz Festival - First indoor Jazz Festival. Chicago, Illinois.
- 25 – Between sets at Birdland in New York City, Miles Davis was beaten by police and jailed.

=== October ===
- 30 – Ronnie Scott's Jazz Club opens in the Soho district of London.

=== November ===
- 29 – 2nd Annual Grammy Awards
  - Frank Sinatra awarded Album Of The Year, Best Arrangement, and Best Vocal Performance, Male for the song "Come Dance With Me".
  - Ella Fitzgerald awarded Best Vocal Performance, Female for the song "But Not for Me", and Best Jazz Performance – Soloist for the album Ella Swings Lightly.
  - Jonah Jones awarded Best Jazz Performance Solo or Small Group for the album I Dig Chicks.
  - Duke Ellington awarded Best Musical Composition First Recorded and Released in 1959 (more than 5 minutes duration), and Best Performance by a Dance Band, and Best Sound Track Album – Background Score from a Motion Picture or Television for composition and soundtrack for the Motion Picture Anatomy of a Murder.
  - Nat King Cole awarded Best Performance by a "Top 40" Artist for "Midnight Flyer".
  - Andre Previn, Ken Darby awarded Best Sound Track Album, Original Cast – Motion Picture or Television for the Motion Picture Porgy and Bess.

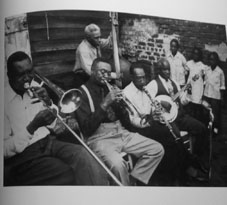
The George Lewis Ragtime Jazz Band in New Orleans, 1950. Left to right: Jim Robinson, trombone; Alcide Pavageau, string bass; Elmer Talbert, trumpet; George Lewis, clarinet; Lawrence Marrero, banjo

== Album releases ==
By Artist Name

- Cannonball Adderley – Cannonball Takes Charge, In San Francisco (Riverside)
- Cannonball Adderley & John Coltrane – Cannonball Adderley Quintet in Chicago (Mercury)
- Chet Baker – Chet (Riverside)
- Art Blakey and the Jazz Messengers – Holiday for Skins (Blue Note)
- Dave Brubeck – Time Out (album) (Columbia)
- Donald Byrd – Fuego, Byrd in Hand (Blue Note)
- Sonny Clark – My Conception (Blue Note)
- Ornette Coleman – Tomorrow Is the Question! (OJC) The Shape of Jazz to Come (Atlantic)
- Miles Davis – Kind of Blue (Columbia)
- Walter Davis – Davis Cup (album) (Blue Note)
- Kenny Dorham – Quiet Kenny (New Jazz)
- Duke Ellington – The Ellington Suites (OJC) Jazz Party, Festival Session, Anatomy of a Murder (Columbia)
- Bill Evans Trio – Portrait in Jazz (Riverside)
- João Gilberto – Chega de Saudade (album) (Odeon)
- Jimmy Giuffre – The Easy Way (album) (Verve)
- Benny Golson – Gone with Golson, Groovin' with Golson (OJC)
- Chico Hamilton – The Three Faces of Chico (Warner Bros.) Gongs East! (Discovery)
- Coleman Hawkins – Hawk Eyes, (OJC) Coleman Hawkins with the Red Garland Trio (Prestige)
- Johnny Hodges and Duke Ellington – Back to Back: Duke Ellington and Johnny Hodges Play the Blues, Side by Side (Verve)
- Milt Jackson and John Coltrane – Bags & Trane (Atlantic)
- Wynton Kelly – Kelly Blue (Contemporary)
- Stan Kenton – Standards in Silhouette (Capitol)
- Yusef Lateef – Cry! – Tender (Prestige)
- Abbey Lincoln – Abbey Is Blue (Riverside/OJC)
- Jackie McLean – New Soil, Swing, Swang, Swingin' (Blue Note)
- Charles Mingus – Mingus Ah Um, Mingus Dynasty (Columbia), Blues and Roots (Atlantic)
- Blue Mitchell – Blue Soul (Riverside)
- The Modern Jazz Quartet and Orchestra – Music from Odds Against Tomorrow (United Artists)
- Thelonious Monk – Thelonious Alone in San Francisco, The Thelonious Monk Orchestra at Town Hall, 5 by Monk by 5 (Riverside/OJC)
- Wes Montgomery – The Wes Montgomery Trio (Riverside/OJC)
- Gerry Mulligan – Gerry Mulligan Meets Ben Webster (Verve), What Is There to Say? (Columbia)
- Oliver Nelson – Meet Oliver Nelson (OJC)
- Art Pepper – Art Pepper + Eleven – Modern Jazz Classics (Contemporary/OJC)
- Sun Ra and His Arkestra – Jazz in Silhouette (Saturn)
- Max Roach – The Many Sides of Max (Mercury)
- George Russell – New York, N.Y. (album) (Impulse)
- Horace Silver – Blowin' the Blues Away, Finger Poppin' (Blue Note)
- Jimmy Smith – The Sermon! (Blue Note)
- Sonny Stitt - Sonny Stitt Blows the Blues (Verve)
- Frank Strozier – Fantastic Frank Strozier (Vee Jay)
- Dinah Washington- What a Diff'rence a Day Makes! (Mercury)
- Ben Webster – Ben Webster and Associates (Verve)
- Curtis Fuller - Blues-ette (Savoy)
- Shel Silverstein and The Red Onion Jazz Band - Hairy Jazz (Elektra)

== Deaths ==
January

- 3 – Ed Cuffee, American trombonist (born 1902).
- 30 – Boyce Brown, American dixieland alto saxophonist (born 1910).

February

- 14 – Baby Dodds, American drummer (born 1898).

March

- 15 – Lester Young, American tenor saxophonist, clarinetist, composer, and bandleader (born 1909).

May

- 5 – Hal McIntyre, American saxophonist, clarinetist, and bandleader (born 1914).
- 14 – Sidney Bechet, American jazz saxophonist, clarinetist, and composer (born 1897).

June

- 5 – Lawrence Marrero, American banjoist (born 1900).
- 23 – Boris Vian, French polymath: writer, poet, musician, singer, translator, critic, actor, inventor and engineer (born 1920).

July

- 11 – Shadow Wilson, American drummer (born 1919).
- 17 – Billie Holiday, American singer nicknamed "Lady Day" (born 1915).

September

- 17 – Omer Simeon, American clarinetist (born 1902).

October

- 14 – Alphonse Trent, American jazz pianist and territory band leader (born 1905).
- 16 – Minor Hall, American drummer (born 1897).

December

- 2 – Sidney Desvigne, American trumpeter (born 1893).
- 10 – Avery Parrish, American jazz pianist, composer and arranger (born 1917).
- 13 – Charlie Johnson, American bandleader and pianist (born 1891).

== Births ==
January

- 11 – Simon Nabatov, Russian pianist.
- 14 – Nguyên Lê, French-Vietnamese guitarist.
- 16 – Sade Adu, British singer-songwriter, composer, arranger and record producer.
- 20 – Antoine Hervé, French composer and pianist.
- 24 – Nils Mathisen, Norwegian keyboardist.
- 28 – Bill Ware, American vibraphonist.

February

- 1 – Ottmar Liebert, German guitarist, songwriter and producer
- 9 – Russel Walder, American oboist.
- 12 – Omar Hakim, American drummer.
- 27
  - Akira Jimbo, Japanese drummer, Casiopea.
  - Clayton Cameron, American drummer.
- 28 – Phil Roy, American singer.

March

- 10 – Rita Marcotulli, Italian pianist and composer.
- 16 – John Lindberg, American upright bassist.
- 18 – Joe Locke, American vibraphonist, composer, and educator.
- 21 – Renato D'Aiello, Italian saxophonist.
- 25 – Per Hillestad, Norwegian drummer.
- 30 – Nils Jansen, Norwegian saxophonist and clarinetist.

April

- 5
  - Elin Rosseland, Norwegian singer, bandleader, and composer.
  - John Parricelli, English guitarist.
- 10 – Brian Setzer, American guitarist, singer, and songwriter.
- 18 – Salman Gambarov, Azerbaijani pianist and composer.
- 19 – Rebecca Jenkins, Canadian actress and singer.
- 23 – Thilo Berg, German drummer.
- 25
  - Burhan Öçal, Turkish percussionist and vocalist.
- 27
  - Odd Magne Gridseth, Norwegian bassist (died 2025).
  - Scott Robinson, American saxophonist.

May

- 9 – Dennis Chambers, American drummer.
- 14 – Virginia Mayhew, American saxophonist, composer, and bandleader.
- 23 – Ken Peplowski, American clarinetist and tenor saxophonist.
- 28 – Eddie Parker, English flautist and composer.

June

- 9 – Gregg Bissonette, American drummer.
- 14 – Marcus Miller, American bassist.
- 15 – Vicki Genfan, American American singer, guitarist, and multi-instrumentalist.
- 19
  - Billy Drummond, American drummer.
  - Roberto Magris, Italian pianist and composer.
- 29 – Rene Van Verseveld, Dutch musician, songwriter, recording engineer, composer, and record producer.

July

- 10 – Anjani, American singer-songwriter and pianist.
- 16 – Joanna MacGregor, British concert pianist, conductor, composer, and festival curator.
- 23 – Alan Barnes, English clarinettist and saxophonist.
- 27 – Jeff Harnar, American singer.
- 31 – Stanley Jordan, American guitarist and pianist.

August

- 1 – Otomo Yoshihide, Japanese composer and multi-instrumentalist.
- 6 – Sigurd Køhn, Norwegian saxophonist (died 2004).
- 7 – Patrick Defossez, Belgian composer, pianist and improviser.
- 9 – Frank Lacy, American trombonist, Mingus Big Band.
- 11 – Russ Gershon, American saxophonist and composer.
- 14 – Tony Monaco, American organist.
- 16 – Ellery Eskelin, American tenor saxophonist.
- 20 – Gaute Storaas, Norwegian bass guitarist and composer.
- 27 – Frode Fjellheim, Norwegian keyboardist and joker.
- 29 – Ernesto Rodrigues, Portuguese composer, violinist, violist and electronic musician.

September

- 5 – Patrick Yandall, American guitarist.
- 13 – Sheldon Reynolds, American guitarist, vocalist, and songwriter.
- 21 – Corinne Drewery, English singer-songwriter.
- 22 – Tony Reedus, American drummer (died 2008).
- 26 – François Bourassa, Canadian pianist.

October

- 12 – Michael Philip Mossman, trumpeter.
- 15 – Erik Vermeulen, Belgian pianist.
- 18 – Jimmy Bosch, Puerto Rican-American trombonist composer and bandleader.
- 19 – Ronnie Burrage, American drummer.
- 20 – Ole Hamre, Norwegian drummer.
- 21 – Cleveland Watkiss, British virtuoso vocalist, actor, and composer.

November

- 1 – Conrad Herwig, American trombonist.
- 3 – Mary Ann Redmond, American singer.
- 18 – Cindy Blackman Santana, American drummer.
- 20 – Drew Gress, American upright bassist and composer.
- 30 – Kris Defoort, Belgian pianist and composer.

December

- 13 – Staffan William-Olsson, Swedish guitarist and composer.
- 16 – Graham Clark, English violinist.
- 22
  - Del Rey, American singer and guitarist.
  - John Patitucci, American upright bassist.
- 25
  - Dale Barlow, Australian saxophonist, flautist, and composer.
  - Zim Ngqawana, South African flautist and saxophonist (died 2011).
- 30
  - Kåre Thomsen, Norwegian guitarist.
  - Paul Jackson Jr., American guitarist.

Unknown date

- Albert Beger, Israeli saxophonist, flutist, and academy lecturer.
- Antonio Ciacca, Italian pianist.
- Bjørn Jenssen, Norwegian drummer
- Dominique Di Piazza, French bassist.
- Kevyn Lettau, Brazilian vocalist.
- Sue Terry, American saxophonist and composer.
- Sweet Baby J'ai, American singer.
- Tahir Aydoğdu, Turkish virtuoso qanun (kanun) player
- Ted Rosenthal, American pianist.

== Awards ==
- Grammy Awards of 1959
  - Best Jazz Performance Solo or Small Group
  - Best Jazz Performance Large Group
  - Best Jazz Composition of More Than Five Minutes Duration

== See also ==
- 1950s in jazz
- List of years in jazz
- 1959 in music

== Bibliography ==
- The New Real Book, Volume I. Sher Music. 1988. ISBN 0-9614701-4-3.
- The New Real Book, Volume II. Sher Music. 1991. ISBN 0-9614701-7-8.
- The New Real Book, Volume III. Sher Music. 1995. ISBN 1-883217-30-X.
- The Real Book, Volume I (6th ed.). Hal Leonard. 2004. ISBN 0-634-06038-4.
- The Real Book, Volume II (2nd ed.). Hal Leonard. 2007. ISBN 978-1-4234-2452-9.
- The Real Book, Volume III (2nd ed.). Hal Leonard. 2006. ISBN 0-634-06136-4.
- The Real Jazz Book. Warner Bros. ISBN 978-91-85041-36-7.
- The Real Vocal Book, Volume I. Hal Leonard. 2006. ISBN 0-634-06080-5.
