= Passin' Thru =

Passin' Thru may refer to:

- Passin' Thru (James Gang album), 1972
- Passin' Thru (Chico Hamilton album), 1962
- Passin' Thru (Charles Lloyd album), 2016

== See also ==
- Passing Through (disambiguation)
