= Ellington Suite =

Studio album by Chico Hamilton Quintet
- Released: 1959
- Recorded: January 9 & 12, 1959
- Studios: Sound Enterprises in Hollywood, CA
- Genre: Jazz
- Label: World Pacific WP-1258 / ST-1258
- Producer: Richard Bock

Chico Hamilton chronology
Gongs East! (1958)	Ellington Suite (1959)	The Three Faces of Chico (1959)

Ellington Suite is an album by drummer and bandleader Chico Hamilton's Quintet featuring multi-instrumentalist Buddy Collette released on the World Pacific label. Hamilton recorded the album to replace recordings from 1958 which were originally shelved and issued as The Original Ellington Suite in 2000.

== Reception ==
Professional ratings
Review scores
Source	Rating
Allmusic	3/5 stars

The Allmusic review by Scott Yanow states: "Well worth picking up by listeners fortunate enough to find it, this is one of Hamilton's hardest-swinging sets of the 1950s".

== Track listing ==
1. "Take the "A" Train & Perdido" (Billy Strayhorn / Juan Tizol) - 2:58
2. "Everything But You" (Duke Ellington, Harry James, Don George) - 4:30
3. "Lucky So and So" (Ellington, Mack David) - 4:51
4. "Azure" (Ellington, Irving Mills) - 3:29
5. "I'm Beginning to See the Light" (Ellington, James, George, Johnny Hodges) - 4:00
6. "In a Mellow Tone" (Ellington, Milt Gabler) - 3:35
7. "Sittin' and a Rockin'" (Ellington, Strayhorn, Lee Gaines) - 3:19
8. "In a Sentimental Mood" (Ellington, Manny Kurtz) - 4:43
9. "Day Dream" (Ellington, Strayhorn, John La Touche) - 3:52
10. "It Don't Mean a Thing" (Ellington, Mills) - 4:16

== Personnel ==
- Chico Hamilton - drums
- Paul Horn - alto saxophone, flute
- Buddy Collette - tenor saxophone, alto saxophone
- Fred Katz - cello
- Jim Hall - guitar
- Carson Smith - bass
