= Nirvana (Charles Lloyd album) =

Studio album by Charles Lloyd
- Released: June 1968
- Recorded: February 19, 1962 (8); May 8, 1964 (4); March 8, 1965 (7); October 15, 1965 (1-3, 5-6); New York City
- Genre: Jazz
- Length: 34:11
- Label: Columbia
- Producer: Teo Macero

Nirvana is a studio album by American saxophonist Charles Lloyd, recorded mainly in 1965, but not released by Columbia until 1968.

== Track listing ==
1. "Island Blues" (Lloyd) - 3:27
2. "Carcara" - 1:46
3. "Long Time, Baby" (Lloyd) - 2:12
4. "East of the Sun (and West of the Moon)" (Bowman) - 4:58
5. "Love Theme From "In Harm's Way" (Jerry Goldsmith) - 2:12
6. "Sun Dance" (Lloyd) - 3:18
7. "You Know" (From "Ecco") - 1:40
8. "One For Joan/Freedom Traveler: Prayer/Journey" (Lloyd) - 14:38

- Track 4 recorded on May 8, 1964; Track 7 recorded on March 8, 1965; Tracks 1, 2, 3, 5 and 6 recorded on October 15, 1965; Track 8 recorded on February 19, 1962. Track 8 originally released on Chico Hamilton's album Drumfusion.

== Personnel ==
Track 1, 2, 3, 5 and 6

- Charles Lloyd - tenor saxophone, flute
- Gábor Szabó - guitar
- Albert Stinson - bass
- Pete LaRoca - drums

Tracks 4 and 7

- Charles Lloyd - tenor saxophone, flute
- Gábor Szabó - guitar
- Ron Carter - bass
- Tony Williams - drums

Track 8

- Charles Lloyd - tenor sax, flute
- Garnett Brown - trombone
- Gábor Szabó - guitar
- Albert Stinson - bass
- Chico Hamilton - drums
