= The Dealer (album) =

Studio album by Chico Hamilton
- Released: 1966
- Recorded: Main album: September 9, 1966; Bonus tracks: March 15, 1965 and September 18, 1962
- Studio: RCA Recording Studios, NYC and Van Gelder Studio, Englewood Cliffs, NJ
- Genre: Jazz
- Length: 51:07
- Label: Impulse! Records (1966); Impulse! Records (1999)
- Producer: Bob Thiele; Michael Cuscuna

Chico Hamilton chronology
The Further Adventures of El Chico (1966)	The Dealer (1966)	The Gamut (1968)

Professional ratings
Review scores
Source	Rating
Allmusic	4/5 stars
The Penguin Guide to Jazz Recordings	3.5/4 stars

The Dealer is a 1966 album by jazz drummer/bandleader Chico Hamilton. It was first released by Impulse! Records (AS-9130) and has been subsequently reissued on CD with the addition of bonus tracks from Chic Chic Chico, Definitive Jazz Scene Vol. 3 and Passin' Thru. The bonus tracks feature different line-ups to that of the album, including Charles Lloyd and Gábor Szabó. The bonus track, "El Toro" is also featured on the Impulsive! Unmixed compilation.

All tracks are originals, composed by Hamilton and some arranged by Jimmy Cheatham. The exceptions are "For Mods Only", composed by free jazz saxophonist Archie Shepp, who features on the track playing piano; some licks played by guitarist, Larry Coryell, from which Mick Taylor (of Bluesbreakers and The Rolling Stones) later used with The Stones; and "Larry of Arabia" by Larry Coryell, here supposedly making his first recording.

== Track listing ==
1. "The Dealer" (Chico Hamilton-Jimmy Cheatham) – 6:21
2. "For Mods Only" (Archie Shepp) – 4:25
3. "A Trip" (Chico Hamilton-Jimmy Cheatham) – 6:35
4. "Baby, You Know" (Chico Hamilton-Jimmy Cheatham) – 3:56
5. "Larry of Arabia" (Larry Coryell) – 5:09
6. "Thoughts" (Chico Hamilton) – 9:20
7. "Jim-Jeannie" (Chico Hamilton) – 5:48

Bonus Tracks

1. "Chic Chic Chico" (Manny Albam) - 2:49
2. "Big Noise From Winnetka" (Ray Bauduc-Bob Haggart-Bob Crosby-Gil Rodin) - 2:49
3. "The Second Time Around" (Jimmy Van Heusen-Sammy Cahn) - 3:12
4. "El Toro" (Chico Hamilton-Charles Lloyd-Gábor Szabó) - 2:49

== Personnel ==
Original Album Chico Hamilton Quartet:

- Chico Hamilton - drums, percussion, vocal on #6
- Larry Coryell - electric guitar
- Arnie Lawrence - alto saxophone, except #5
- Richard Davis - bass

Featuring:

- Archie Shepp - piano on #2
- Ernie Hayes - organ on #4 and #5
- Jimmy Cheatham - arranger on #1 and #4, conductor on #3
- Unknown - percussion and tambourine on #7

Bonus Tracks:

- Chico Hamilton - drums
- Albert Stinson - bass, vocal on #9
- Willie Bobo - maracas on #8, cowbells on #9
- Charles Lloyd - flute on #9 and #11, tenor saxophone on #10
- Gábor Szabó - guitar on #8, #10 and #11
- George Bohanon - trombone on #10, probably maracas and percussion on #11
- Jimmy Woods - tenor saxophone on #8

Production

- Bob Thiele - original producer
- Bob Simpson - recording engineer (original album)
- Rudy Van Gelder - recording engineer (bonus tracks)
- Michael Cuscuna - reissue producer
- Erick Labson remastering
- Robert Flynn/Viceroy - cover design
- Charles Shabacon - photographs
- Hollis King - art direction
- Edward O'Dowd - graphic design

== Locations ==
- Original album recorded at RCA Recording Studios, New York City
- Bonus tracks recorded at Rudy Van Gelder Recording Studio, New Jersey
- Remastered at MCA Music Media Studios
