= That Hamilton Man =

Studio album by Chico Hamilton Quintet
- Released: 1959
- Recorded: May 19–20, 1959; Hollywood, CA
- Genre: Jazz
- Label: SESAC N-2901/02

Chico Hamilton chronology
The Three Faces of Chico (1959)	That Hamilton Man (1959)	Bye Bye Birdie-Irma La Douce (1960)

That Hamilton Man is an album by drummer and bandleader Chico Hamilton, recorded in 1959 and released on the SESAC label. The album was a limited release "electronic transcription" to promote SESAC-controlled material to radio stations.

== Reception ==
Professional ratings
Review scores
Source	Rating
AllMusic	3/5 stars

AllMusic rated the album three stars.

== Track listing ==
1. "Fat Mouth" (Dick Vance) - 3:01
2. "Theme for a Starlet" (Hal Keller) - 2:46
3. "Little Lost Bear" (Krevit) - 1:48
4. "Champs-Elysees" (Gerald Wiggins) - 2:32
5. "Pretty Little Theme" (Chico Hamilton) - 1:51
6. "Lost in the Night" (Richard Maltby) - 3:18
7. "Frou Frou" (Victor Young) - 3:19
8. "Cawn Pawn" (Hale Smith) - 2:31
9. "Lullaby for Dreamers" (Vance) - 2:59
10. "Opening" (Hamilton) - 1:39
11. "Lady "E"" (Eric Dolphy) - 2:40
12. "Truth" (Drucker) - 3:08

== Personnel ==
- Chico Hamilton - drums
- Eric Dolphy - alto saxophone, bass clarinet, flute
- Nathan Gershman - cello
- Dennis Budimir - guitar
- Ralph Pena (tracks 8 & 11), Wyatt Ruther (tracks 1–7, 9, 10 & 12) - bass
