= The Head Hunters =

Studio album by Chico Hamilton
- Released: 1969
- Recorded: 1968
- Genre: Jazz
- Length: 34:11
- Label: Solid State; SS-18050
- Producer: Chico Hamilton

Chico Hamilton chronology
The Gamut (1968)	The Head Hunters (1969)	El Exigente: The Demanding One (1970)

The Head Hunters is an album by American jazz drummer Chico Hamilton featuring performances recorded in 1968 and originally released on the Solid State label.

== Reception ==
The Allmusic review by Scott Yanow called it an "intriguing if erratic set" stating "not essential, but it is a missing link in the long career of Chico Hamilton".

Professional ratings
Review scores
Source	Rating
Allmusic	4/5 stars

== Track listing ==
All compositions by Chico Hamilton except as indicated

1. "Guitar Willie" - 5:04
2. "Reach and Grab It" - 5:30
3. "I Found It" - 1:05
4. "Head Hunters" - 4:25
5. "Conglomerates" - 6:00
6. "Ol' Man" (Jimmy Cheatham) - 3:12
7. "Cee Ee Jaaa" - 3:25
8. "Them's Good Ole Days" - 5:30

== Personnel ==
- Chico Hamilton - drums
- Steve Potts - alto saxophone
- Russ Andrews - tenor saxophone
- Robert Ashton - baritone saxophone
- Ray Nance - violin
- Eric Gale - guitar
- Jan Arnet - bass
