= The Chico Hamilton Quintet with Strings Attached =

Studio album by Chico Hamilton Quintet
- Released: 1959
- Recorded: October 26–27, 1958; Los Angeles, CA
- Genre: Jazz
- Length: 37:53
- Label: Warner Bros. WS 1245

Chico Hamilton chronology
The Original Ellington Suite (1958)	The Chico Hamilton Quintet with Strings Attached (1959)	Gongs East! (1958)

The Chico Hamilton Quintet with Strings Attached is an album by drummer and bandleader Chico Hamilton's Quintet, recorded in 1958 and released on the Warner Bros. label. The album features some of the earliest released recordings of Eric Dolphy.

== Reception ==
Professional ratings
Review scores
Source	Rating
AllMusic	4/5 stars

Billboard called it "an outstanding jazz set featuring fine performances and exciting ideas." The AllMusic review by Scott Yanow states: "The West Coast jazz chamber music generally holds one's interest."

== Track listing ==
1. "Something to Live For" (Billy Strayhorn, Duke Ellington) - 3:56
2. "Andante" (Luther Henderson) - 2:30
3. "Speak Low" (Kurt Weill, Ogden Nash) - 2:28
4. "Pottsville, U.S.A." (Bill Potts) - 5:43
5. "Don's Delight" (Chico Hamilton, Howard McGhee) - 3:49
6. "Strange" (Fred Fisher, John La Touche) - 3:09
7. "Modes" (Fred Katz) - 6:38
8. "Fair Weather" (Benny Golson) - 3:00
9. "Close Your Eyes" (Bernice Petkere) - 4:38
10. "Ev'rything I've Got" (Richard Rodgers, Lorenz Hart) - 2:02

== Personnel ==
- Chico Hamilton - drums, percussion
- Eric Dolphy - alto saxophone, bass clarinet, flute
- Nathan Gershman - cello
- Dennis Budimir - guitar
- Wyatt Ruther - bass
- unidentified string section arranged and conducted by Fred Katz
