= Man from Two Worlds =

Studio album by Chico Hamilton
- Released: 1964
- Recorded: December 11, 1963
- Studio: Van Gelder Studio, Englewood Cliffs, NJ
- Genre: Jazz
- Length: 66:12
- Label: Impulse!
- Producer: Bob Thiele

Chico Hamilton chronology
| A Different Journey (1963) | Man from Two Worlds (1964) | Chic Chic Chico (1965) |

Man from Two Worlds is an album by American jazz drummer Chico Hamilton featuring performances recorded in 1963 for the Impulse! label. The CD reissue added four compositions from Hamilton's previous album Passin' Thru (1962) as bonus tracks.

== Reception ==
The Allmusic review by Scott Yanow awarded the album 4½ stars and stated: "Although it tended to get overlooked at the time, one of drummer Chico Hamilton's finest groups was his 1962–1963 quartet/quintet...this band placed a stronger emphasis on melody and softer sounds than the more avant-garde groups of the time but still pushed away at musical boundaries".

Professional ratings
Review scores
| Source | Rating |
|---|---|
| Allmusic | 4.5/5 stars |
| The Rolling Stone Jazz Record Guide | 4/5 stars |

== Track listing ==
All compositions by Charles Lloyd except as indicated

1. "Man from Two Worlds" – 5:53
2. "Blues Medley: Little Sister's Dance/Shade Tree/Island Blue" – 3:20
3. "Forest Flower: Sunrise/Sunset" – 10:11
4. "Child's Play" – 3:44
5. "Blues for O.T." – 4:34
6. "Mallet Dance" – 4:49
7. "Love Song to a Baby" – 3:47
8. "Passin' Thru" – 8:16 (Bonus track on CD reissue)
9. "Transfusion" – 2:42 (Bonus track on CD reissue)
10. "Lady Gabor" (Gábor Szabó) – 13:15 (Bonus track on CD reissue)
11. "Lonesome Child" – 5:41 (Bonus track on CD reissue)

- Recorded at Rudy Van Gelder Studio in Englewood Cliffs, New Jersey on September 18, 1962 (tracks 8 & 9) and September 20, 1962 (tracks 10 & 11) and December 11, 1963 (tracks 1–7)

== Personnel ==
- Chico Hamilton – drums
- Charles Lloyd – tenor saxophone, flute
- Gábor Szabó – guitar
- Albert Stinson – bass
- George Bohanon – trombone (tracks 8–11)
