= Sticky Fingers (tribute band) =

American tribute band playing Rolling Stones songs

- Origin: New Jersey/Massachusetts, U.S.
- Genres: Rock, blues rock
- Years active: 1990s–present
- Members: Glen Carroll – lead vocals
- Past members: Waddy Wachtel – guitar; Kenny Aronoff – drums; Bernard Fowler – backing vocals; Bobby Keys – saxophone (until 2014)
- Website: www.stickyfingersband.com

Sticky Fingers is an American rock band founded by vocalist Glen Carroll, initially as a Rolling Stones tribute act before evolving into an original music project featuring sidemen from the Stones' extended lineup.

== History ==
=== Tribute Era (1990s–2000s) ===
Formed in the early 1990s, Sticky Fingers quickly became one of the most acclaimed Rolling Stones tribute acts, noted for their meticulous recreations of 1970s-era Stones shows. A 1994 Entertainment Weekly profile highlighted their commercial success and stagecraft, with Carroll stating: "This is not about getting our hair cut the way we want to. This is business." The band toured extensively, playing 3–4 nights weekly and earning up to $10,000 per show.

=== Original Music Era (2012–present) ===
In 2012, Sticky Fingers released their debut original album, Like a Rolling Stone, produced by Andy Johns (engineer of Exile on Main St.). The sessions featured Stones collaborators including saxophonist Bobby Keys and backing vocalist Bernard Fowler. The cover art was designed by John Pasche, creator of the Rolling Stones' "Tongue and Lips" logo. Critics praised the album's "raw, blues-drenched sound" bridging tribute roots and original songwriting.

== Legacy ==
Sticky Fingers is among few tribute acts to successfully transition to original music while retaining ties to the artists they honored. Their 2012 lineup—featuring Stones alumni and producer Andy Johns—was described as "a rock hall of fame unto itself" (The Aquarian).

== Discography ==
- Like a Rolling Stone (2012) – Produced by Andy Johns. Artwork by John Pasche.

== Band members ==
Various members have played with Sticky Fingers during recording sessions and gigs.

Band consists of musicians that admire and several that have performed with The Rolling Stones. Carroll started as the band's drummer, but became the lead singer after "going through several vocalists a month".

== Album ==
Sticky Fingers released their album "Like a Rolling Stone" in November 2012.

It includes original works in the styling of 1960's-1970's classic rock inspired by the sounds of the Rolling Stones. The Skope Magazine, which has reviewed the release, acknowledges this feature as well as stylistic variety of some of songs resulting from influences of "George Thorogood and the Destroyers" and “Bad Reputation” by Joan Jett.

=== Track listing ===
All songs written by Glen Carroll unless otherwise noted.

- One Way Street
- You Baby You (C. McCarty, G. Mallabar);
- I Miss The Good Times
- Knockin' On Heaven's Door (B. Dylan, [G. Carroll - third verse]);
- As Good As It Gets
- Tribute
- At First Sight
- Christine
- Lady Blue
- White Roses
- Her Very Last Time

=== Personnel ===
Credits adapted from waddywachtelinfo.com.

- Glen Carroll – vocals, percussion, background Vocals (tracks 1 - 11)
- Waddy Wachtel – acoustic guitar, electric guitar, dobro, slide guitar, guitar solos (tracks 1 - 11)
- Kenny Aronoff – drums, percussion (tracks 1 - 11)
- Kenny Aaronson – bass, pedal steel (tracks 1 - 11)
- Bobby Keys – saxophone (tracks 1, 5, 6, 7, 8, 9, 10)
- Bernard Fowler – background vocals (tracks 1, 3, 4, 5, 11)
- Andy Johns – producer
- Fred Knoblock – Engineer
- Rene Van Verseveld – engineer
- Nate Staley – engineer
- Niko Bolas – mixing
- Ron McMaster – mastering
- John Pasche – album art
- Jim Steinfeldt – insert photos

"Like a Rolling Stone" is the "Top 10 Album" in 2013 according to 'The Aquarian Weekly' writers.

== 'Like a Rolling Stone' Book ==
In 2008, author Steven Kurutz released his book “Like a Rolling Stone: The Strange Life of a Tribute Band.” It features Glen Carroll on the cover and observes the world of Sticky Fingers while they repeated the path of The Rolling Stones 2005-2006 tour, playing at different places.

Steven Kurutz defines Sticky Fingers as a tribute band because these musicians not only strives to sound but also look like The Rolling Stones. As Kurutz says, such tribute bands "dedicate themselves to one particular group and try to emulate them".

== Television ==
In January, 2013 the Sticky Fingers were invited as guest judges on WCBS-FM's "Jukebox Jury: Should There Be A Rock & Roll Retirement Age?" discussing iconic rock bands like The Rolling Stones and The Beach Boys, which are still not only making influence on the modern rock scene but recording new music.
