= Luv in the Afternoon =

Studio album by Jeannie Cheatham & Jimmy Cheatham and the Sweet Baby Blues Band
- Released: 1990
- Genre: Jazz, blues
- Label: Concord Jazz
- Producer: Carl E. Jefferson

Jeannie Cheatham & Jimmy Cheatham and the Sweet Baby Blues Band chronology
Back to the Neighborhood (1989)	Luv in the Afternoon (1990)	Basket Full of Blues (1992)

Luv in the Afternoon is an album by the American band Jeannie Cheatham & Jimmy Cheatham and the Sweet Baby Blues Band, released in 1990. It was awarded "Blues Album of the Year" by the critics at DownBeat.

== Production ==
Luv in the Afternoon was produced primarily by Carl E. Jefferson; after some conflict between Jefferson and the band, the album was completed by assistant producer Nick Phillips. The songs were arranged by Jimmy Cheatham, who also played trombone. Clarence "Gatemouth" Brown played guitar on three of the tracks. Snooky Young contributed on trumpet; Curtis Peagler contributed on saxophone. Red Callender played tuba. "Raunchy Rita" is about a housekeeper at a Seattle hotel that the Cheathams visited regularly. "Trav'lin' Light" is a version of the Johnny Mercer song. "Don't You Feel My Leg" is a cover of the Danny Barker composition.

== Critical reception ==
Professional ratings
Review scores
Source	Rating
AllMusic	4/5 stars
The Encyclopedia of Popular Music	3/5 stars
MusicHound Blues: The Essential Album Guide	3/5 stars
The News and Observer	3/4 stars
Omaha World-Herald	3.5/5 stars
The Penguin Guide to Jazz on CD, LP & Cassette	3/4 stars
The Philadelphia Inquirer	3/4 stars

The Los Angeles Times said that "Jeannie Cheatham's earthy vocals and swinging piano drive the music." The Ottawa Citizen stated that "Jeannie's vocals and piano playing plus Jimmy's trombone work and arrangements are the backbone of a shouting, funky band with a sound and feeling to please old-timers and '90s audiences alike." The Philadelphia Inquirer called the music "revivalist jazz based with fervor and love on the mother lode of the blues." The Commercial Appeal concluded that the Cheathams' "brand of big band blues combines the celebratory, collective flavor identified with New Orleans jazz and the fervor of Kansas City swing." The News and Observer noted that Jeannie "can play the subtle seductress or the red-hot mama with equal panache."

== Track listing ==
No.	Title	Length
1.	"Messin' 'Round with the Boogie"
2.	"Luv in the Afternoon"
3.	"Mama's Blues"
4.	"Comin' Back to South Chicago"
5.	"Trav'lin' Light"
6.	"Don't You Feel My Leg"
7.	"You Won't Let Me Go"
8.	"Wee Baby Blues"
9.	"Baby Please Don't Go"
10.	"Raunchy Rita"
