= Wyatt Ruther =

American jazz musician

Wyatt "Bull" Ruther
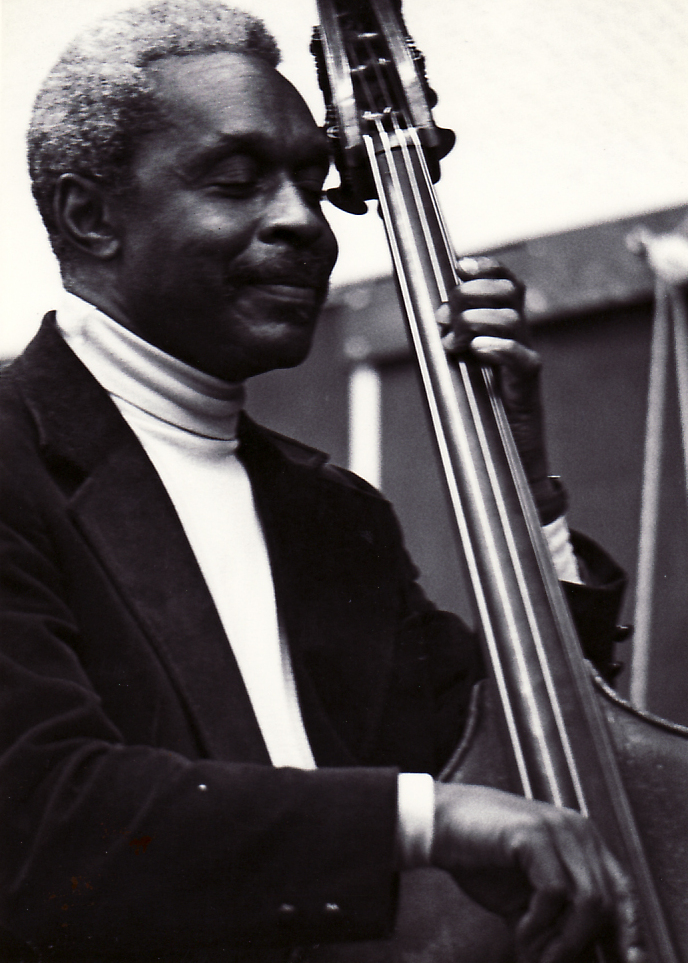

Background information
- Birth name: Wyatt Robert Ruther
- Also known as: "Bull" Ruther
- Born: February 5, 1923; Pittsburgh, Pennsylvania, United States
- Died: October 31, 1999 (aged 76); San Pablo, California, United States
- Years active: 1947-1999
- Spouse: Juanita Ruther

Wyatt Robert "Bull" Ruther (February 5, 1923, Pittsburgh – October 31, 1999, San Francisco) was an American jazz double-bassist.

== Formative years ==
Born in Pittsburgh, Pennsylvania on February 5, 1923, Ruther was known to family and friends as "Bull." A trombone student in high school before picking up the double-bass, he relocated to the San Francisco Bay Area in 1947, where he studied at the San Francisco Conservatory of Music.

In 1950, he returned to his hometown, where he pursued further studies at the Pittsburgh Musical Institute.

== Performance career ==
During the 1950s, Ruther performed in New York City with Dave Brubeck (1951–52) and Erroll Garner (1951-55). He also toured with Lena Horne in 1953 and recorded a split album under his own name along with Milt Hinton and Wendell Marshall in 1955 for RCA Records entitled Basses Loaded.

Following this, he performed with Toshiko Akiyoshi in 1956, and then studied at the Royal Conservatory of Music in Toronto, Canada. While in Canada, he was a member of the Canadian Jazz Quartet (1956–57) and also performed with Peter Appleyard (1957). In addition, he performed in the United States during the same period, taking the stage with Ray Bryant, Zoot Sims, Bob Brookmeyer, and Chico Hamilton.

In 1959, he toured with George Shearing and then embarked on a world tour with Buddy Rich from 1960 to 1961. From 1962 to 1963, he was a member of Gerry Mulligan's quartet; he then joined Count Basie from 1964 to 1965.

Later in the 1960s, Ruther worked freelance in the San Francisco area and played at the Olympic Hotel in Seattle from 1971 to 1973. He then moved to Vancouver, British Columbia, Canada, and played with Fraser MacPherson from 1975 to 1979. He played at the Ankor Hotel in Vancouver during the early 1980s, and while there, worked with Sammy Price, Jay McShann, and Dorothy Donegan.

Ruther returned to San Francisco in 1984, where he performed with Stan Getz, Lou Stein, John Handy, Benny Carter, Joe Henderson, and Jerome Richardson in the late 1980s and early 1990s. Late in life he played regularly at the Bix Supper Club.

== Death and funeral ==
A working musician until the end of his life, Ruther died at his home in San Pablo, California, on October 31, 1999, from a heart attack at the age of seventy-six. Memorial services were held at noon on Saturday, November 13 at the Wilson and Kratzer Funeral Home in Richmond, California.

== Discography ==
With Ray Bryant

- Ray Bryant Trio (Epic, 1956)

With Al Grey

- Shades of Grey (Tangerine, 1965)

With Chico Hamilton

- The Chico Hamilton Quintet with Strings Attached (Warner Bros., 1958)
- Gongs East! (Warner Bros., 1958)
- The Three Faces of Chico (Warner Bros., 1959)
- That Hamilton Man (SESAC, 1959)

With Erroll Garner

- Mambo Moves Garner (Mercury, 1954)

With The Dave Brubeck Quartet: Brubeck-Desmond - 4 Tracks - Vogue LAE 12114 Recorded November 1951
