= Arnie Lawrence =

American jazz musician (1938–2005)

Arnold Lawrence Finkelstein (July 10, 1938 in Brooklyn, New York – April 22, 2005 in Jerusalem) was an American jazz saxophonist.

== Career ==
Lawrence studied clarinet in his youth before switching to saxophone. He played from age 12 in clubs in the Catskills, and by age 17 was performing at Birdland, at one point working a double bill with John Coltrane. He played with Charles Mingus, Thad Jones, Maynard Ferguson, Clark Terry and Duke Pearson but did not make his first recordings until 1966, playing on Chico Hamilton's The Dealer. He worked for several years with Hamilton, and became a soloist on The Tonight Show from 1967 to 1972. His first records as a leader appeared in 1968.

In the early 1970s Lawrence played with Willie Bobo, then joined Blood, Sweat & Tears in 1974. He did a world tour with Liza Minnelli in 1978–79, and released a few more records under his own name before touring with Louie Bellson in the early 1980s. He composed a symphony entitled Red, White and Blues, which was premiered by the Amor Artis Chamber Orchestra in Williamsburg, Virginia; Lawrence, Dizzy Gillespie, and Julius Baker all soloed in the performance.

Lawrence had taught from the middle of the 1970s, working as an artist in residence in Kentucky and Kansas. In 1986, he stopped recording and touring and founded the New School for Jazz and Contemporary Music in New York City; among the program's students were Roy Hargrove, Brad Mehldau, Larry Goldings, John Popper, Peter Bernstein and Spike Wilner of Smalls Jazz Club. He moved to Israel in 1997, where he founded the International Center for Creative Music, an education facility open to both Jewish and Arab students. He played regularly in Israel and owned his own nightclub called Arnie's Jazz Underground. He suffered from lung and liver cancer late in life, and died in Jerusalem in 2005.

== Discography ==
=== As leader ===
- You're Gonna Hear from Me (Project 3, 1966)
- Look Toward a Dream (Project 3, 1968)
- Inside an Hour Glass (Embryo, 1970)
- Unobstructed Universe (Adamo, 1976)
- Renewal (Palo Alto, 1982)
- Arnie Lawrence and Treasure Island (Doctor Jazz, 1983)

=== As sideman ===
With Chico Hamilton

- The Dealer (Impulse!, 1966)
- El Exigente: The Demanding One (Flying Dutchman 1970)
- Peregrinations (Blue Note, 1975)
