= Bye Bye Birdie (disambiguation) =

Bye Bye Birdie is a 1960 Broadway musical.

Bye Bye Birdie may also refer to:

== Film ==
- Bye Bye Birdie (1963 film), an American film adaptation of the stage musical, or the title song, performed by Ann-Margret
- Bye Bye Birdie (1995 film), an American television film based on the stage musical

== Television episodes ==
- "Bye, Bye Birdie" (Full House episode), 1990
- "Bye, Bye Birdie / Belch of Destiny", a 1995 episode of Rocko's Modern Life

== See also ==
- Bye Bye Birdie-Irma La Douce, a 1961 album by the Chico Hamilton Quintet
- "Bye Bye Birdies", a 2008 episode of Wow! Wow! Wubbzy!
- "Bye Bye Bird", a 1963 song written by Willie Dixon and Sonny Boy Williamson II
- Bye Bye Byrd, 1959 American Harness Horse of the Year
