= The Original Ellington Suite =

Studio album by Chico Hamilton Quintet
- Released: 2000
- Recorded: August 22, 1958; Los Angeles, CA
- Genre: Jazz
- Length: 42:09
- Label: Pacific Jazz
- Producer: Richard Bock

Chico Hamilton chronology
Chico Hamilton Trio Introducing Freddie Gambrell (1958)	The Original Ellington Suite (2000)	The Chico Hamilton Quintet with Strings Attached (1958)

The Original Ellington Suite is an album by drummer and bandleader Chico Hamilton's Quintet, recorded in 1958 but not released on the Pacific Jazz label until 2000. The album was shelved and Hamilton recorded another set of Ellington tunes with a different group that was released as Ellington Suite in 1959.

== Reception ==
Professional ratings
Review scores
Source	Rating
AllMusic	4/5 stars
The Penguin Guide to Jazz Recordings	3/4 stars

The AllMusic review by Ken Dryden states: "Chico Hamilton's pianoless chamber jazz recordings for Pacific Jazz between 1955 and 1959 are important landmarks, but the discovery of this long-lost date adds to his many achievements. Highly recommended". In JazzTimes, Harvey Pekar wrote that "the principal importance of the disc is Dolphy's appearance. Aside from some work he did on Roy Porter big band selections cut in 1949, this is his initial appearance on record... Dolphy's improvising is excellent but, except on 'It Don't Mean a Thing', restrained, which is not surprising, since Hamilton had a chamber-jazz group... overall, the arrangements here are by and large pallid".

== Track listing ==
1. "In a Mellotone" (Duke Ellington) - 4:18
2. "In a Sentimental Mood" (Ellington, Irving Mills, Manny Kurtz) - 5:40
3. "I'm Just a Lucky So-and-So" (Ellington, Mack David) - 5:08
4. "Just A-Sittin' and A-Rockin'" (Ellington, Billy Strayhorn, Lee Gaines) - 5:23
5. "Everything But You" (Ellington, Harry James, Don George) - 5:16
6. "Day Dream" (Ellington, Strayhorn, John La Touche) - 3:41
7. "I'm Beginning to See the Light" (Ellington, George, James, Johnny Hodges) - 5:07
8. "Azure" (Ellington, Mills) - 3:13
9. "It Don't Mean a Thing" (Ellington, Mills) - 4:17

== Personnel ==
- Chico Hamilton - drums
- Eric Dolphy - alto saxophone, flute, clarinet
- Nathan Gershman - cello
- John Pisano - guitar
- Hal Gaylor - bass
