= Someday Somewhere =

Someday Somewhere or Someday, Somewhere may refer to:

- Someday Somewhere (Demis Roussos song), 1973 single
- Someday, Somewhere (Jolin Tsai song), 2023 single
- Someday, Somewhere, 2015 EP by Mura Masa
- Someday, Somewhere, 2021 EP by Patrick Yandall
