= The Chico Hamilton Special =

Studio album by Chico Hamilton Quintet
- Released: 1961
- Recorded: November 28–29, 1960; New York City
- Genre: Jazz
- Length: 35:43
- Label: Columbia CL 1619

Chico Hamilton chronology
Bye Bye Birdie-Irma La Douce (1960)	The Chico Hamilton Special (1961)	Drumfusion (1962)

The Chico Hamilton Special is an album by drummer and bandleader Chico Hamilton recorded in 1960 and released on the Columbia label.

The album cover was photographed by Los Angeles–based photographer Leigh Wiener.

== Reception ==
Professional ratings
Review scores
Source	Rating
AllMusic	4.5/5 stars
DownBeat	4/5 stars

The contemporaneous DownBeat reviewer believed that this was the best band that Hamilton had led, and concluded that the album was "by far the best album the drummer has recorded in terms of jazz spirit, exciting soloists, and, above all, deep-down swing". The AllMusic review by Scott Yanow states: "this would be the last album in Hamilton's famous string of cello groups before the drummer changed directions. Interesting if not essential music".

== Track listing ==
1. "Don't Get Lost" (H. Smith) – 5:25
2. "Autumn Leaves" (Joseph Kosma) – 4:20
3. "New Rhumba" (Ahmad Jamal) – 4:04
4. "Way Down" (N. Jones) – 5:27
5. "Afternoon of a Breeze" (Dorothy Ashby) – 5:50
6. "Lady Bird" (Tadd Dameron) – 3:37
7. "Trio" (Chico Hamilton) – 7:00

== Personnel ==
- Chico Hamilton – drums
- Charles Lloyd – alto saxophone, flute
- Nate Gershman – cello
- Harry Polk – guitar
- Bobby Haynes – bass
