= The Gamut (album) =

Studio album by Chico Hamilton
- Released: 1968
- Recorded: 1968
- Genre: Jazz
- Length: 34:11
- Label: Solid State SS-18043
- Producer: Chico Hamilton

Chico Hamilton chronology
| The Dealer (1968) | The Gamut (1968) | The Head Hunters (1969) |

The Gamut is an album by American jazz drummer Chico Hamilton featuring performances recorded in 1968 and originally released on the Solid State label.

== Reception ==
Allmusic gave the album 2 stars.

Professional ratings
Review scores
| Source | Rating |
|---|---|
| Allmusic | 2/5 stars |

== Track listing ==
1. "Daht-Doo-Dah" (Chico Hamilton) - 2:48
2. "The Second Time Around" (Sammy Cahn, Jimmy Van Heusen) - 3:00
3. "Jonathan's Theme" (Jeannie Cheatham, Jimmy Cheatham) - 2:35
4. "People Will Say We're in Love" (Richard Rodgers, Oscar Hammerstein II) - 4:00
5. "Blow, Jim, Blow" (Hamilton, Jimmy Cheatham, Jimmy Cleveland) - 4:31
6. "Third Wing on the Left Side of an Eagle" (Jimmy Cheatham) - 3:23
7. "Broadway" (Billy Bird, Henri Woode, Teddy McRae) - 2:51
8. "MSP" (Hamilton, Jimmy Cheatham, Steve Potts) - 5:22
9. "Theme for a Woman" (Hamilton, Jimmy Cheatham) - 6:10

== Personnel ==
- Chico Hamilton - drums
- Danny Banks - flute
- Steve Potts - alto saxophone
- Russell Andrews - tenor saxophone
- Jimmy Cleveland, Britt Woodman, William Cambell - trombone
- Jimmy Cheatham - bass trombone, arranger
- Jan Arnet - bass
- Jackie Arnold - voice
