= Jimmy Cheatham =

American jazz trombonist and teacher (1924–2007)

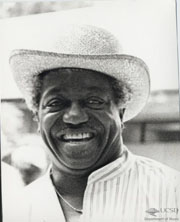

Background information
- Born: James Rudolph Cheatham; June 18, 1924; Birmingham, Alabama, U.S.
- Died: January 12, 2007 (aged 82) San Diego, California
- Genres: Jazz
- Occupation: Musician
- Instrument: Trombone
- Years active: 1940s–2000s

James Rudolph Cheatham (June 18, 1924 – January 12, 2007) was an American jazz trombonist and teacher, who played with Chico Hamilton, Ornette Coleman, Thad Jones, Mel Lewis, Lionel Hampton, Frank Foster, and Duke Ellington.

In 1978, Cheatham was invited to lead the jazz program at University of California, San Diego. In 1979 he began to direct the school's African American and jazz performance programs. He retired in 2005.

== Biography ==
Cheatham was born in Birmingham, Alabama on June 18, 1924, the son of Isabelle (née Steen) and Andrew Cheatham, who was a conductor on the Louisville and Nashville Railroad. After his parents separated when he was a small child, he grew up with his mother and sister, Arlene, in Buffalo, New York. In February 1943, he enlisted in the United States Army, and was a member of the 173rd Army Ground Force Band from 1944 to 1946, when he was demobilized following the end of World War II. At various times, his colleagues in the band included Eddie Chamblee, Chico Hamilton, Jo Jones, Lester Young, and also Harry White, whom Cheatham said had been "like a mentor" to him.

Taking advantage of the G.I. Bill, Cheatham was able to attend the New York Conservatory of Modern Music in Brooklyn from 1948 to 1950, then from 1950 to 1953 studied at the Westlake College of Music in Los Angeles, (Note: Opened in 1945, Westlake College was only the second institution in the United States to offer a university-level jazz program, after Schillinger House in Boston. It closed in 1961.) where he developed a lifelong friendship with one of his instructors, Russell Garcia. While at Westlake, a piece he wrote for string quartet (Note: It is unclear if this referred to Menorah, a work for flute quartet composed by (a) James Cheatham, which was played at a 1953 concert in Los Angeles involving Elmer Bernstein.) was performed at a concert with Paul Robeson, and he also received a scholarship to the nearby American Operatic Laboratory. Amongst the visitors to the flat he shared with saxophonist Buddy Collette in Los Angeles were Charlie Parker, and the first Gerry Mulligan quartet (including Chico Hamilton) who went there to rehearse.

Cheatham met his wife, Jean Evans, in 1956 in Buffalo, New York, when the local musicians' union chief called them separately to replace two musicians who could not make a job at the local Elks Ballroom. They married in 1959, and their son, Jonathan, was born the same year His wife also had a daughter from a previous relationship, Shirley, who was born in 1951.

During the 1970s, Cheatham taught jazz at Bennington College in Vermont, and also at the University of Wisconsin in Madison, Wisconsin.

In 1984, Cheatham and his wife won a bronze medal at the New York Festivals Film and TV Awards for the 1983 KPBS television special Three Generations of the Blues, which featured Sippie Wallace, Big Mama Thornton, and Jennie Cheatham.

Also in 1984, the Cheathams formed the Sweet Baby Blues Band, reviving Kansas City-style blues. The first of the eight studio albums they released between 1985 and 1996, Sweet Baby Blues, was the sole recording to receive a Grand Prix du Disque de Jazz (Note: This should not be confused with the Grand Prix du Disque Jazz, awarded by the Académie Charles Cros.) from the Hot Club de France in 1985. Their fifth album, Luv in the Afternoon (1990), was also voted amongst the best blues albums of the year in Down Beat magazine's 39th annual poll of international music critics, as published in 1991. In 1998, the band was described as "an earthy jump blues combo that plays funky, hard-swinging, boogie-busting music".

Cheatham's legacy is carried on by several students who went on to become, like him, prominent composer/performer/educators: flutist Nicole Mitchell, bassist Karl E. H. Seigfried, and drummer Vikas Srivastava.

Cheatham died in San Diego, California on January 12, 2007, aged 82, having undergone heart surgery the previous month.

== Discography ==
=== As co-leader ===
==== Studio albums ====
- Sweet Baby Blues (1985) – Note: includes the Cheatham's signature song, "Meet Me With Your Black Drawers On".
  Jeannie Cheatham and Jimmy Cheatham
  with Red Callender, John "Ironman" Harris, Charles McPherson, Jimmy Noone, Curtis Peagler, Snooky Young
  Concord Jazz
  CCD-4258 (CD) CJ-258 (LP) CJC-258 (MC)
- Midnight Mama (1986)
  Jeannie and Jimmy Cheatham and the Sweet Baby Blues Band
  Concord Jazz
  CCD-4297 (CD) CJ-297 (LP) CJ 297-C (MC)
- Homeward Bound (1987)
  Jeannie and Jimmy Cheatham and the Sweet Baby Blues Band
  Concord Jazz
  CCD-4321 (CD) CJ-321 (LP) CJ 321-C (MC)
- Back to the Neighborhood (1989)
  Jeannie & Jimmy Cheatham and the Sweet Baby Blues Band
  Concord Jazz
  CCD-4373 (CD) CJ-373 (LP) CJ 373-C (MC)
- Luv in the Afternoon (1990)
  Jeannie & Jimmy Cheatham and the Sweet Baby Blues Band
  Concord Jazz
  CCD-4429 (CD)
- Basket Full of Blues (1992)
  Jeannie and Jimmy Cheatham and the Sweet Baby Blues Band
  Concord Jazz
  CCD-4501 (CD) CJ 501-C (MC)
- Blues and the Boogie Masters (1993)
  Jeannie & Jimmy Cheatham and the Sweet Baby Blues Band
  Concord Jazz
  CCD-4579 (CD)
- Gud Nuz Bluz (1996)
  Jeannie & Jimmy Cheatham and the Sweet Baby Blues Band
  Concord Jazz
  CCD-4690 (CD)

==== Compilation albums ====
- The Concord Jazz Heritage Series: Jeannie and Jimmy Cheatham (1998)
  Jeannie and Jimmy Cheatham
  Concord Jazz
  CCD-4837 (CD)

=== As sideman ===
With Bill Dixon

- Intents and Purposes (RCA Victor, 1967)

With Chico Hamilton

- El Chico (Impulse!, 1965)
- The Further Adventures of El Chico (Impulse!, 1966)
- The Dealer (Impulse!, 1966) (Note: Cheatham arranged two tracks on the album and conducted a third, but played (uncredited) percussion only. The final track on the original LP release, "Jim-Jeannie", was named after the Cheathams.)
- The Gamut (Solid State, 1968)
- Juniflip (Joyous Shout, 2006)

With Grover Mitchell

- Meet Grover Mitchell (Jazz Chronicles, 1979)
- The Devil's Waltz (Jazz Chronicles, 1981)
