= El Chico (album) =

Studio album by Chico Hamilton
- Released: 1966
- Recorded: August 26–27, 1965
- Genre: Jazz
- Length: 35:37
- Label: Impulse!
- Producer: Bob Thiele

Chico Hamilton chronology
Chic Chic Chico (1965)	El Chico (1966)	The Further Adventures of El Chico (1966)

El Chico is an album by American jazz drummer Chico Hamilton featuring performances recorded in 1965 for the Impulse! label.

== Reception ==
The Allmusic review by Scott Yanow stated: "The influences of Latin jazz, bossa nova, and the avant-garde are mixed into the unusual musical blend".

Professional ratings
Review scores
Source	Rating
Allmusic	3/5 stars
The Rolling Stone Jazz Record Guide	3/5 stars

== Track listing ==
All compositions by Chico Hamilton except as indicated

1. "El Chico" - 4:06
2. "People" (Bob Merrill, Jule Styne) - 6:06
3. "Marcheta" (Victor Schertzinger) - 4:00
4. "This Dream" (Leslie Bricusse, Anthony Newley) - 3:17
5. "Conquistadores" (Willie Bobo, Chico Hamilton, Albert Stinson, Gábor Szabó, Bob Thiele) - 6:40
6. "El Moors" - 2:22
7. "Strange" (John La Touche, Marvin Fisher) - 4:46
8. "Helena" - 4:20
- Recorded in New York City on August 26 (tracks 3 & 7) and August 27 (tracks 1, 2, 4–6 & 8), 1965

== Personnel ==
- Chico Hamilton – drums
- Jimmy Cheatham – trombone
- Sadao Watanabe – alto saxophone
- Gábor Szabó – guitar
- Albert Stinson – bass
- Willie Bobo, Victor Pantoja – percussion
