= Passing Through =

Passing Through or Passin' Thru may refer to:

== Music ==
- Passing Through (Owen Temple album), 1999
- Passing Through (Randy Travis album), 2004
- Passin' Thru (James Gang album), 1972
- Passin' Thru (Chico Hamilton album), 1962
- "Passing Through", a 1948 folk song written by Dick Blakeslee and recorded by Pete Seeger, The Highwaymen, Cisco Houston, Earl Scruggs, Leonard Cohen, Valdy, The Waterboys and Kind of Like Spitting
- "Passing Through", a song by The Walls
- "Passing Through", a song by The Boomtown Rats

== Film and theatre ==
- Passing Through (1921 film), American film
- Passing Through (1977 film), American film
- Passing Through, a 1991 play by Mervyn Thompson
