= Bye Bye Birdie-Irma La Douce =

Studio album by Chico Hamilton Quintet
- Released: 1961
- Recorded: November 1960
- Genre: Jazz
- Length: 38:28
- Label: Columbia CL 1590 / CS 8590

Chico Hamilton chronology
That Hamilton Man (1959)	Bye Bye Birdie-Irma La Douce (1961)	The Chico Hamilton Special (1960)

Bye Bye Birdie-Irma La Douce (full title The Chico Hamilton Quintet Plays Selections from Bye Bye Birdie-Irma La Douce) is an album by drummer and bandleader Chico Hamilton featuring jazz adaptations of tunes from the Broadway musicals Bye Bye Birdie and Irma La Douce recorded in 1960 and released on the Columbia label.

== Reception ==
Professional ratings
Review scores
Source	Rating
AllMusic	2/5 stars

AllMusic rated the album two stars.

== Track listing ==
Side 1: All compositions by Marguerite Monnot

1. "Irma La Douce" - 3:52
2. "Our Language of Love" - 3:47
3. "From a Prison Cell" - 4:01
4. "She's Got the Lot" - 2:57
5. "There Is Only One Paris for That" - 3:41

Side 2: All compositions by Charles Strouse and Lee Adams

1. "A Lot of Livin' to Do" - 5:49
2. "Baby, Talk to Me" - 3:06
3. "Put On a Happy Face" - 2:42
4. "How Lovely to Be a Woman" - 3:55
5. "Kids!" - 2:38

== Personnel ==
- Chico Hamilton - drums
- Charles Lloyd - alto saxophone, flute
- Nathan Gershman - cello
- Harry Pope - guitar
- Bobby Haynes - bass
