= A Different Journey =

Studio album by Chico Hamilton Quintet
- Released: 1963
- Recorded: January 19, 29 & 31, 1963; Los Angeles and San Francisco
- Genre: Jazz
- Length: 41:49
- Label: Reprise R-6078

Chico Hamilton chronology
Passin' Thru (1962)	A Different Journey (1963)	Man from Two Worlds (1963)

A Different Journey is an album by drummer and bandleader Chico Hamilton recorded in 1963 and released on the Reprise label.

== Reception ==
Professional ratings
Review scores
Source	Rating
AllMusic	3/5 stars
The Penguin Guide to Jazz Recordings	3/4 stars

The Allmusic review by Scott Yanow states:

lots of advanced yet logical improvising, and more than its share of variety. The group had its own sound and was quite underrated during its relatively short life. A gem.

— Yanow, Scott. A Different Kind of Journey – Review at AllMusic. Retrieved June 30, 2015.

On All About Jazz David Rickert wrote:

By this time Hamilton had cast off the light, chamber jazz directions he pursued in the fifties in favor of the advances of Coltrane and Coleman. In Lloyd he chose a perfect musical director; his compositions are not based on melodic heads as much as they are springboards for challenging improvisation.

— Rickert, David (August 18, 2002). "The Chico Hamilton Quintet: A Different Journey". All About Jazz.

== Track listing ==
All compositions by Charles Lloyd

1. "Sun Yen Yen" - 5:58
2. "Voice in the Night" - 6:55
3. "A Different Journey" - 7:53
4. "The Vulture" - 4:14
5. "One Sheridan Square" - 15:06
6. "Island Blues" - 1:43

== Personnel ==
- Chico Hamilton - drums
- George Bohanon - trombone
- Charles Lloyd - tenor saxophone, flute
- Gábor Szabó - guitar
- Albert Stinson - bass

== Sources ==
- Rickert, D. (August 18, 2002). "All About Jazz Review".
