= Chico Hamilton Trio Introducing Freddie Gambrell =

Studio album by Chico Hamilton Trio
- Released: 1958
- Recorded: March 25–26, 1958
- Studios: Radio Recorders Studio in Hollywood, California
- Genre: Jazz
- Label: World Pacific PJ-1242
- Producer: Richard Bock

Chico Hamilton chronology
South Pacific in Hi-Fi (1958)	Chico Hamilton Trio Introducing Freddie Gambrell (1958)	The Original Ellington Suite (1958)

Chico Hamilton Trio Introducing Freddie Gambrell is an album by American drummer and bandleader Chico Hamilton, released on the World Pacific label.

== Reception ==
Professional ratings
Review scores
Source	Rating
AllMusic	2/5 stars

AllMusic rated the album 2 stars.

== Track listing ==
1. "Lullaby of the Leaves" (Bernice Petkere, Joe Young) - 5:45
2. "Reservation Blues" (Freddie Gambrell) - 4:51
3. "These Foolish Things" (Jack Strachey, Holt Marvell, Harry Link) - 4:07
4. "Ex-Ray's Friends" (Gambrell) - 4:06
5. "Devil's Demise" - 5:37 (Ben Tucker)
6. "You're the Cream in My Coffee" (Ray Henderson, Buddy DeSylva, Lew Brown) - 4:16
7. "Midnight Sun" (Lionel Hampton, Sonny Burke, Johnny Mercer) - 4:40
8. "Five Minutes More" (Jule Styne, Sammy Cahn) - 3:06

== Personnel ==
- Chico Hamilton - drums
- Freddie Gambrell - piano
- Ben Tucker - bass
