= Chic Chic Chico =

Studio album by Chico Hamilton
- Released: 1965
- Recorded: January 4 and March 16, 1965
- Genre: Jazz
- Length: 35:49
- Label: Impulse!
- Producer: Bob Thiele

Chico Hamilton chronology
Man from Two Worlds (1963)	Chic Chic Chico (1965)	El Chico (1965)

Chic Chic Chico is an album by American jazz drummer Chico Hamilton featuring performances recorded in 1965 for the Impulse! label.

The title song was included as a bonus track on the CD reissue of The Dealer.

== Reception ==
The Allmusic review by Scott Yanow awarded it 4 stars and stated: "Not essential, but this album has its strong moments".

Professional ratings
Review scores
Source	Rating
Allmusic	4/5 stars

== Track listing ==
All compositions by Gábor Szabó except as indicated

1. "Chic Chic Chico" (Manny Albam) - 2:47
2. "Corrida De Toros" - 5:35
3. "Tarantula" - 3:03
4. "What's New?" (Bob Haggart, Johnny Burke) - 6:02
5. "St. Paddy's Day Parade" (Chico Hamilton) - 3:09
6. "Carol's Walk" (Chico Hamilton) - 6:36
7. "Swampy" - 2:45
8. "Fire Works" - 5:52
- Recorded in Hollywood, California, on January 4, 1965 (tracks 2–8) and March 16, 1965 (track 1)

== Personnel ==
- Chico Hamilton – drums
- John Anderson – trumpet (tracks 2–8)
- Lou Blackburn – trombone (tracks 2–8)
- Henry Sigismonti – French horn (tracks 2–8)
- Charles Lloyd – flute (track 1)
- Bill Green – flute, piccolo (tracks 2–8)
- Harold Land (tracks 2–8), Jimmy Woods (track 1) – tenor saxophone
- Gábor Szabó – guitar
- Albert Stinson – bass
- Willie Bobo – percussion (track 1)
