= Peregrinations =

Studio album by Chico Hamilton
- Released: 1975
- Recorded: July 9–10, 1975
- Studios: A & R Studios, NYC and Sound Factory West, Los Angeles
- Genre: Jazz
- Label: Blue Note BN-LA 520
- Producer: Keg Johnson

Chico Hamilton chronology
The Master (1973)	Peregrinations (1975)	Chico Hamilton and the Players (1976)

Peregrinations is an album by American jazz drummer Chico Hamilton featuring performances recorded in 1975 and originally released on the Blue Note label.

== Reception ==
The Allmusic review by Scott Yanow called it 'an uncomfortable mixture of advanced jazz and commercial elements" stating "The overall effect is a bit weird, dated but with some colorful moments. Definitely a mixed bag".

Professional ratings
Review scores
Source	Rating
Allmusic	3/5 stars

== Track listing ==
All compositions by Chico Hamilton except as indicated

1. "V-O" (Steve Turre) - 3:58
2. "The Morning Side of Love" - 5:18
3. "Abdullah and Abraham" (Arnie Lawrence) - 4:16
4. "Andy's Walk" - 4:15
5. "Peregrinations" - 3:16
6. "Sweet Dreams" - 5:53
7. "Little Lisa" (Turre) - 2:49
8. "Space for Stacy" - 3:06
9. "On and Off" - 2:56
10. "It's About That Time" - 0:57

== Personnel ==
- Chico Hamilton - drums, percussion
- Arthur Blythe - alto saxophone
- Arnie Lawrence - tenor saxophone, soprano saxophone
- Joe Beck, Barry Finnerty - electric guitar
- Steve Turre - electric bass, trombone
- Abdullah - congas, bongos, percussion
- Jerry Peters - piano, electric piano
- Charlotte Politte - synthesizer programs
- Julia Tillman Waters, Luther Waters, Maxine Willard Waters, Oren Waters - vocals
