= Glen Carroll =

American songwriter

- Born: Glen Edward Carroll; January 8, 1960 (age 66); Springfield, Massachusetts
- Genres: Alternative rock, Adult Contemporary, pop, classic rock
- Occupations: Singer; songwriter; record producer
- Instruments: Vocals, guitar, harmonica, percussion, drums
- Years active: 1989–present
- Label: Capitol / Continental
- Member of: Sticky Fingers
- Website: glencarroll.com

Glen Carroll (born January 8, 1960) is an American musician, songwriter, record producer and lead vocalist. Carroll wrote and recorded Like A Rolling Stone, the "Top 10 Album" in 2013 (according to 'The Aquarian Weekly' writers).

== Early life ==
Glen Edward Carroll was born in Springfield, Massachusetts, on January 8, 1960. He was raised in a military family. When he was 12, he moved with his family to Ramstein, Germany, where he first began playing guitar. At age 15, Carroll moved to Lakenheath, England, and started his first band, "Skip Church and the Choir Boys". Carroll returned to the United States in the summer of 1976. Carroll attended and graduated Summerville High School, Summerville, South Carolina, the College of Charleston, and William Howard Taft College of Law (JD).

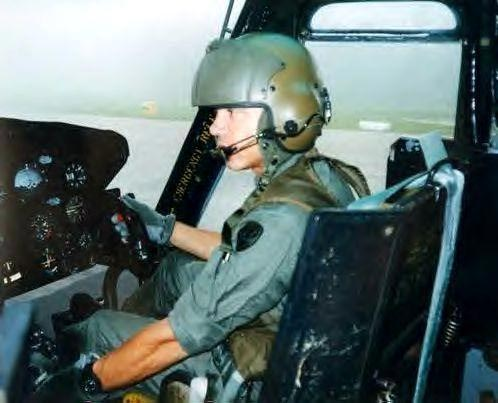
Glen Carroll in 1989

== Music career ==
Glen Carroll formed Sticky Fingers in 1989 after serving in the U.S. military as a pilot. At first, Carroll performed as the band's drummer. However, after the band went through several vocalists a month, Carroll became the band's vocalist. For the next 25 years, Carroll lead the band as singer and business manager.

In 2008, Steven Kurutz published Like a Rolling Stone. Carroll was the main character in the book and his photograph is featured on the cover. At the time of publication, Carroll had toured every year for 18 years. In 2013, the band released an album called Like a Rolling Stone. Carroll wrote the songs, and all the musicians that took part in making of the album had performed or recorded with The Rolling Stones.

== Releases ==
The first EP called "Travelin' Man" was released in September 2004. Glen Carroll attributes it to the times he has spent moving and traveling in 1980s.

Glen also wrote and released the album, Like a Rolling Stone in November 2012. The album includes original works in the styling of 1960s–1970s classic rock inspired by the sounds of the Rolling Stones. Band on the album includes musicians who have played with the Rolling Stones: Waddy Wachtel on guitar, Kenny Aronoff on drums, Bobby Keys on sax, Ian McLagan on keys, Bernard Fowler on backup vocals, and Kenny Aaronson on bass. Like a Rolling Stone was co-produced by Andy Johns, a British sound engineer, and record producer, who worked on several well-known rock albums by the Rolling Stones, and a series of albums by Led Zeppelin. Artwork for the album was created by John Pasche. Pasche designed the "Tongue and Lip Design" logo in 1971, which was originally reproduced on the "Sticky Fingers" album by the Rolling Stones. Pasche designed tour posters for the Rolling Stones between 1970 and 1974 and also worked for other reputed artists, such as Paul McCartney, and The Who.

=== Track listing of the Like a Rolling Stone album ===
- "One Way Street" (G. Carroll)
- "You Baby You" (C. McCarty, G. Mallabar)
- "I Miss The Good Times" (G. Carroll)
- "Knockin' On Heaven's Door" (B. Dylan, [G. Carroll – third verse])
- "As Good As It Gets" (G. Carroll)
- "Tribute" (G. Carroll)
- "At First Sight" (G. Carroll)
- "Christine" (G. Carroll)
- "Lady Blue" (G. Carroll)
- "White Roses" (G. Carroll)
- "Her Very Last Time" (G. Carroll)

== Awards and nominations ==
=== Independent Music Awards ===
Year	Nominee / work	Award	Result
2016	"Good Times"	Best Adult Contemporary Song	Nominated

== Television ==
Carroll appeared in the American variety television show The Jenny Jones Show as the musical guest on Friday, October 17, 1997.
