= The Further Adventures of El Chico =

Studio album by Chico Hamilton
- Released: 1966
- Recorded: May 2 & 5, 1966
- Studios: Van Gelder Studio. Englewood Cliffs, NJ
- Genre: Jazz
- Length: 33:54
- Label: Impulse!
- Producer: Bob Thiele

Chico Hamilton chronology
El Chico (1965)	The Further Adventures of El Chico (1966)	The Dealer (1966)

The Further Adventures of El Chico is an album by American jazz drummer Chico Hamilton featuring performances recorded in 1966 for the Impulse! label.

== Reception ==
The Allmusic review by Ron Wynn awarded the album 2½ stars: "Sometimes super and sometimes ragged cuts".

Professional ratings
Review scores
Source	Rating
Allmusic	2.5/5 stars

== Track listing ==
All compositions by Chico Hamilton except as noted

1. "Got My Mojo Working" (Preston Foster) - 3:05
2. "Who Can I Turn To (When Nobody Needs Me)?" (Leslie Bricusse, Anthony Newley) - 3:35
3. "That Boy With The Long Hair" - 4:10
4. "Daydream" (John Sebastian) - 2:10
5. "The Shadow Of Your Smile" (Johnny Mandel, Paul Francis Webster) - 2:53
6. "Evil Eye" (Gábor Szabó) - 3:15
7. "Monday, Monday" (John Phillips) - 2:23
8. "Manila" - 4:45
9. "My Romance" (Lorenz Hart, Richard Rodgers) - 2:50
10. "Stella by Starlight" (Ned Washington, Victor Young) - 4:50

- Recorded at Rudy Van Gelder Studio in Englewood Cliffs, New Jersey on May 2, 1966 (tracks 2, 5, 6 & 8-10) and May 5, 1966 (tracks 1, 3, 4 & 7)

== Personnel ==
- Chico Hamilton – drums
- Clark Terry - trumpet (tracks 1 & 4)
- Jimmy Cheatham - trombone (tracks 1, 3, 4 & 7)
- Danny Bank - piccolo (tracks 1, 3, 4 & 7)
- Jerome Richardson - flute, alto saxophone (tracks 1, 3, 4 & 6–10)
- Charlie Mariano - alto saxophone (tracks 1, 3, 4 & 6–10)
- Gábor Szabó – guitar
- Ron Carter (tracks 2, 5, 6 & 8–10), Richard Davis (tracks 1, 3, 4 & 7) – bass
- Willie Bobo, Victor Pantoja - percussion
