= El Exigente: The Demanding One =

Studio album by Chico Hamilton
- Released: 1970
- Recorded: 1970
- Genre: Jazz
- Length: 33:13
- Label: Flying Dutchman; FD/FDS 10135
- Producer: Bob Thiele

Chico Hamilton chronology
The Head Hunters (1969)	El Exigente: The Demanding One (1970)	The Master (1973)

El Exigente: The Demanding One is an album by American jazz drummer/composer/bandleader Chico Hamilton released by the Flying Dutchman label in 1970.

== Reception ==
Professional ratings
Review scores
Source	Rating
AllMusic	3/5 stars

AllMusic awarded the album 3 stars.

== Track listing ==
All compositions by Chico Hamilton except where noted

1. Maybe Tomorrow, Never (A Suite):
  1. "As I Open My Eyes" − 6:28
  2. "Take Me There" − 2:25
  3. "I Came and Saw the Beauty of Your Love" (Hamilton, Steve Swallow) − 3:32
  4. "How 'Bout Bobby?" (Bob Mann, Hamilton) − 2:25
  5. "Stomp, Stomp, Stomp" (Arnie Lawrence, Hamilton) − 2:22
  6. "Swingin' on a Sitar" (Lawrence) − 1:33
2. Maybe Tomorrow, Never (A Suite): − 14:28
  1. "Up Front What Counts"
  2. "On the Trail (From "Grand Canyon Suite")" (Ferde Grofe)
  3. "Seat Belt" (Mann, Hamilton)
  4. "Volvo's" (Lawrence, Hamilton)
  5. "Gonna Get Some Right Now" (Lawrence)

== Personnel ==
- Chico Hamilton − drums
- Arnie Lawrence − alto saxophone
- Bob Mann − guitar
- Steve Swallow − bass
