= Jeannie Cheatham =

American blues and jazz musician

Jeannie Cheatham (born Jean Elizabeth Evans, August 14, 1927) is an American blues and jazz singer, pianist, and composer. She is noted most for her musical collaboration with husband Jimmy Cheatham, with whom she formed the Sweet Baby Blues Band in 1984. Her autobiography, Meet Me With Your Black Drawers On: My Life In Music, was published in 2006 by the University of Texas Press.

== Biography ==
Cheatham was born and grew up in Akron, Ohio, the first child (Note: Her parents later had two more daughters and three sons.) of Elizabeth (née Smart) and Ernest Evans. At the age of five, she started having lessons on her aunt's newly acquired piano, which was soon moved to Cheatham's home when it transpired that she had a talent for music her aunt lacked. Not long after, she began playing for services at the church her family attended. Throughout her school years, Cheatham's piano teacher also took her to play at weddings and social events, as well as to give recitals.

Cheatham first played jazz music when, aged 14, she was asked to join a local 15-piece rehearsal orchestra. While still in high school, she began playing in smaller groups, and found herself in demand professionally as most younger musicians were drafted into the US Army during World War II. In 1944, she was accepted as a student at the University of Akron, but was unable to complete more than one year for financial reasons.

Writing in the Los Angeles Times in 1992, Dirk Sutro (author of Jazz for Dummies) noted that "Jeannie Cheatham remains one of the under-appreciated greats of jazz and blues, both for her spare, tasteful piano playing, which ranges from boogie-woogie to Monk‑ish surprises, and for her earthy but sensuous voice."

In 2006, Jeannie and Jimmy Cheatham received a lifetime achievement award at the San Diego Music Awards, and in November 2022, were inducted into the San Diego Music Hall of Fame.

== Discography ==
- Academy Awards in Jazz (1964)
  Roberta Como & Jean Cheatham
  with George Duvivier and Jo Jones
  Grenadier Records
  GLP-100 (Mono LP) GSLP-100 (Stereo LP)
- Changing with the Times (1993)
  George Lewis
  New World Records
  New World 80434-2 (CD)

== Notes ==
The Jimmy and Jeannie Cheatham Collection is part of the University of Missouri-Kansas City Special Collections and Archives Repository.
