= Rene Van Verseveld =

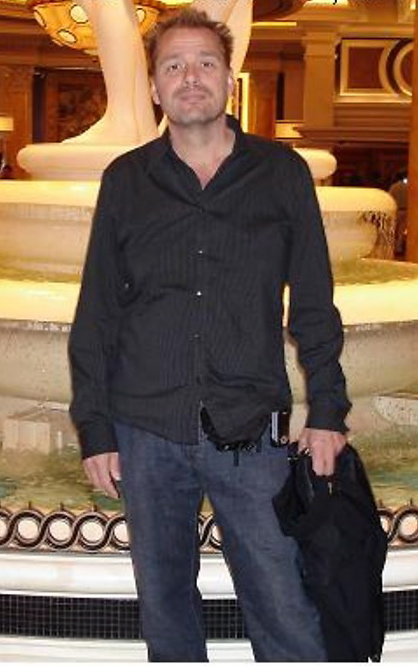
- Rene at Caesars Palace, Las Vegas, in 2008

Background information
- Birth name: Rene Francis Van Verseveld
- Born: 29 June 1959 (age 65); Utrecht, Netherlands
- Origin: Utrecht, Netherlands
- Genres: Jazz, hip hop, R&B, pop, Indian, dance, reggaeton
- Occupation(s): Record producer, engineer, song writer
- Instrument(s): Synthesizer, keyboards, turntables, drum machine, sampler, guitar, bass
- Years active: 1983–present

Rene Van Verseveld (born 29 June 1959) is a Dutch musician, songwriter, recording engineer, composer and record producer. He lives in Santa Clarita and works in his own studio, Future Sound Studios, in Hollywood, California.

== Early years ==
Rene Van Verseveld, son of Dutch jazz musician Cees Van Verseveld, began playing music at age 9. A classically trained bassist, he toured the world playing on cruise ships before collaborating with King MC in Amsterdam on the 1986 European hit "What Have I Done for You Lately".

== Top 40 European hits between 1986 and 1992 ==
Rene Van Verseveld established himself as a European dance record producer working with such artists as Candy Dulfer and 2 Unlimited, charting in the Dutch, French, Scandinavian, German and British Top 40 Dance and Pop Charts 9 times between the years of 1986 and 1992 with the songs:

- Gerard Joling - "Can't Take My Eyes Off Of You"
- Tatjana Simic ft. Wendy Alane Wright - "Feel Good"
- Def La Desh ft. Wendy Alane Wright - "Feel The Rhythm"
- Zype - "Used To Be Your Lover"
- Room 4 2 - "Over You"
- Room 4 2 - "Baby He's Mine"
- Miker G - "Show'm The Bass"
- T-Minus 5 - "Unforgiven" ft. Wendy Alane Wright
- King MC - "What Have I Done For You Lately"

== Engineering and production career ==
Rene Van Verseveld moved to Los Angeles, California in 1994, where he formed Future Sound Studios. He partnered up with Fernando Garibay and together, they have worked with many artists, such as:

- Sonu Nigam
- Han Geng
- Dr. Dre
- Kumbia Kings
- Los Super Reyes
- Mark Wahlberg
- Ricky Martin
- Lady Gaga
- Mark Anthony
- Paris Hilton
- Macy Gray
- Little Richard
- Grace Jones
- Garbage
- Jay-Z
- Enrique Iglesias
- Will Smith
- Technotronic
- Ike Turner (Risin' with the Blues - 2007 Grammy Winning Album, Traditional Blues category)
- Smokey Robinson
- Kevin Hart (Real Husbands of Hollywood)
- Kelly Rowland
- Bobby Brown

Are among many who visited and recorded at his studio.

== Film and television scores ==
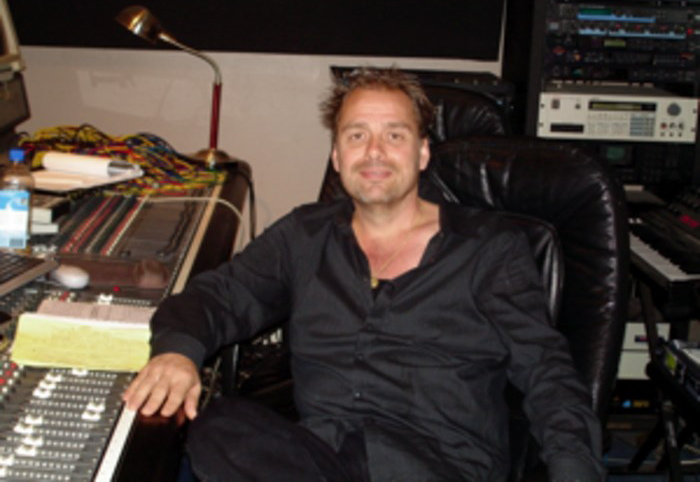

Rene Van Verseveld has worked as composer and/or engineer on the scores of numerous television programs and films including:

- Pancharangi (film) - 2010
- Dress My Nest - Style Network (television series) - 2008
- Most Shocking Unsolved Crimes (television series) - 2008
- Sunset Tan Reality (reality show) - 2008
- Destination Truth (television series) - 2008
- Celebrity Exposed (television series) - 2008
- Access Hollywood (entertainment news program) - 2008
- History Channel -2008
- 90210 (television series) - 2008
- Everybody Hates Chris (television series) - 2007
- American Pie Presents: Beta House (film) - soundtrack - "Techno" 2007
- Burn Notice (television series) - 2007 and 2008
- Just Jordan (television series) - 2007
- X's & O's (film) - 2007
- The King of Queens (television series) - 1999 to 2007
- Lincoln Heights (television series) - 2006
- Invincible (film) - 2006
- Lost (television series) - 2006
- Soul Food (television series) - 2004
- CSI: Miami (television series) - 2004
- American Pie (film) - 2001
- Big Brother (television series) - 2000 and 2001
- The Parkers (television series) - 1999
- Butter (film) - 1998
- Real Husbands Of Hollywood (2014 BET reality show)
