= Tahir Aydoğdu =

Turkish jazz musician

Tahir Aydoğdu (born 1959) is a Turkish virtuoso qanun (kanun) player, musician and lecturer. He is noted for fusing together the qanun and Turkish classical music with western jazz and classical music.

== Early years ==
Aydoğdu was born in Istanbul in 1959. His music studies began during high school years when he participated in many choruses. His father Gültekin Aydoğdu was his teacher who was also a noted qanun player at TRT Ankara Radio and conductor of the Turkish Fasıl Ensemble. Aydoğdu is a graduate of the Physics Department of the Middle East Technical University (METU) in Ankara.

== Career ==
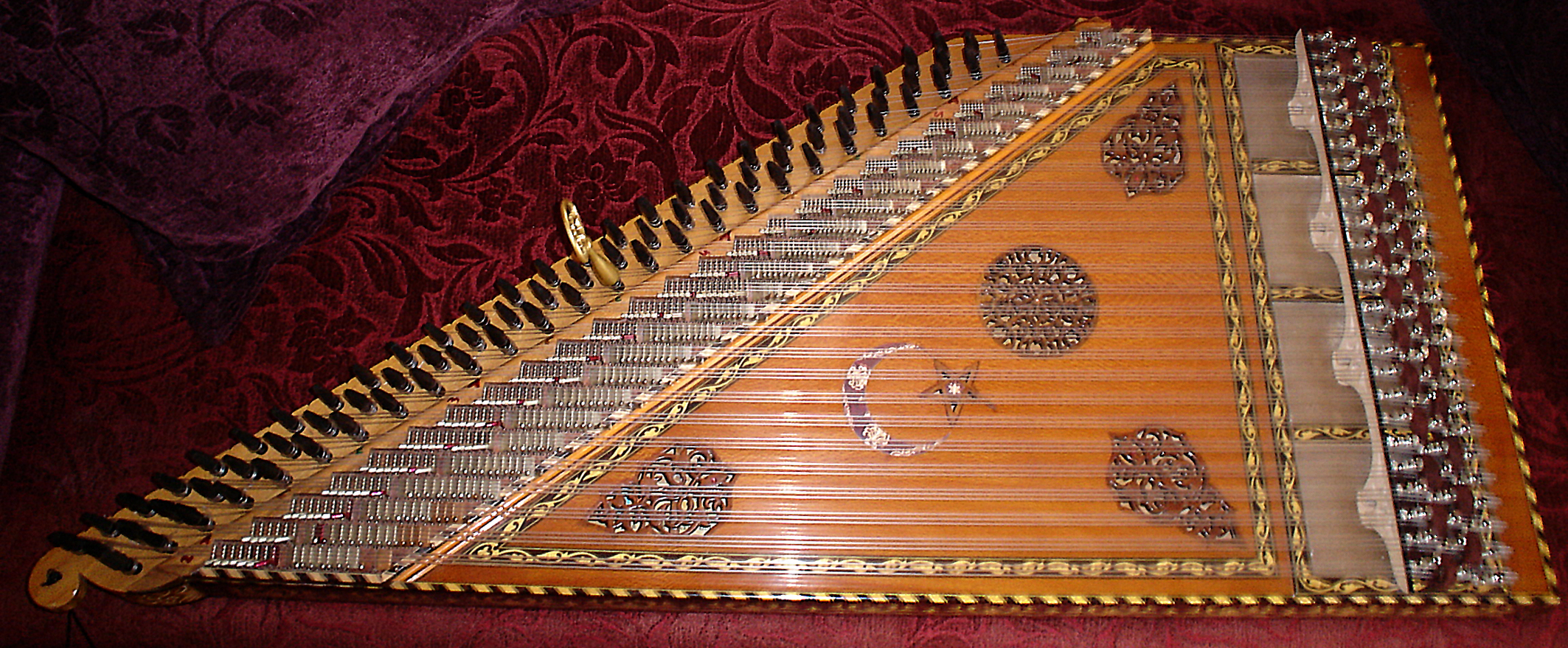
Aydoğdu is one of the world's leading players of the qanun.

After his studies, Aydoğdu started his career as a qanun player in the TRT Ankara Radio Turkish Music Ensemble, a position which he has continued. Aydoğdu has been a member of several other ensembles in his career. He played with the Turkish Music Ensemble of the State Conservatory of Afyon Kocatepe University, with vocalist and bendir player Timucin Cevikoglu. For eight years, Aydoğdu toured the US, Europe and Asia with the Modern Folk Trio (Modern Folk Üçlüsü), representing Turkey. This was followed by his association with Asiaminor Jazz Ensemble. This took Aydoğdu on tours over a 10-year period on musical programmes and lectures during a 10-year tour of Europe and the US. In 1999, he established his own "Ensemble Ancyra", with the objective of presenting various forms of music of the world such as jazz and others.

Aydoğdu participated in several roles of orchestra, dance and music, in many the ballet performances like "Ali Baba & Forty Kharamies" (Ankara State Ballet & Opera Orchestra), Turgay Erdener's ballet "Afife" (Presidential Symphony Orchestra) and "Harem" (music arrangement). On his album entitled Hasret he recorded a version of jazz pianist Dave Brubeck's "Take Five". He is noted for his rendition of Ferid Alnar's "Kanun Concerto", which very few musicians are able to perform.

In April 2008, Aydoğdu played at the Boston Turkish Film and Music Festival with Ara Dinkjian on oud, Ismail Lumanovski on clarinet, and Seido Salifoski on percussion/darbuka.

Aydoğdu has lectured on music in Hochschule für Musik, Theater und Medien Hannover, Kyrenia, METU, Selçuk University, and Gazi University. He received the appreciation prize from the Senate of METU (2001), and is a member of the Budapest-based World Cymbalom Association. His achievements are a subject of master's degree at the Turkish Music Conservatory of the Ege University.

== Music CD/Video releases ==
His music CD/video releases are:

- "Along the street" (Vienna 1991)
- "Longanova" (Ankara 1997)
- "Cat’s Dream" (Ankara 1998)
- "Yahya Kemal in the music of Cinuçen Tanrıkorur" with the oud composer;
- "Balkanataolia" with the jazz singer Yıldız İbrahimova;
- "From Sufi to Flamenco" with the Dutch guitarist Eric Vaarzon Morel;
- "Afife" Turkish Ballet (2000)
- "Ferid Alnar"
