= Albert Stinson =

American musician

Albert Stinson (August 2, 1944 in Cleveland, Ohio – June 2, 1969) was an American jazz double-bassist.

Stinson learned to play piano, trombone, and tuba before settling on bass at age 14. After his graduation from John Muir High School in Pasadena, California in 1962, he began playing professionally in the early 1960s in Los Angeles, working with Terry Gibbs, Frank Rosolino, Chico Hamilton, and Charles Lloyd (1965). Later in the decade he worked with Larry Coryell, John Handy (1967), Miles Davis, Bobby Hutcherson (1967), and Gerald Wilson's Los Angeles-based big band. His ebullient personality, bright tone, and aggressive attack all contributed to his being nicknamed "Sparky".

Stinson died on tour of a drug overdose in 1969 at the age of 24. He never recorded as a leader but appears on Hamilton's Impulse! albums, Hutcherson's Blue Note album Oblique, and Handy's Koch Records album New View! He also appears on Clare Fischer's album Surging Ahead.

== Discography ==
With Larry Coryell

- Coryell (Vanguard, 1969)

With Miles Davis

- Live 1967 University of California (Eternal Grooves/Howlin', 2022)

With Clare Fischer

- Surging Ahead (Pacific Jazz, 1963)

With Chico Hamilton

- Drumfusion (Columbia, 1962)
- Passin' Thru (Impulse!, 1962)
- A Different Journey (Reprise, 1963)
- Man from Two Worlds (Impulse!, 1963)
- Chic Chic Chico (Impulse!, 1965)
- El Chico (Impulse!, 1965)

With John Handy

- New View (Columbia, 1967)

With Bobby Hutcherson

- Oblique (Blue Note, 1967)

With Charles Lloyd

- Of Course, of Course (Columbia, 1965)
- Nirvana (Columbia, 1965)

With Joe Pass

- Catch Me! (Pacific Jazz, 1963)

With Gábor Szabó

- Gypsy '66 (Impulse!, 1966)
