= Drumfusion =

Studio album by The New Dynamic Chico Hamilton Quintet
- Released: 1962
- Recorded: February 19, 1962; New York City
- Genre: Jazz
- Length: 38:28
- Label: Columbia
- Producer: Irving Townsend and Teo Macero

Chico Hamilton chronology
The Chico Hamilton Special (1960)	Drumfusion (1962)	Passin' Thru (1962)

Drumfusion is an album by drummer and bandleader Chico Hamilton recorded in 1962 and released on the Columbia label.

== Reception ==
Professional ratings
Review scores
Source	Rating
AllMusic	4/5 stars

The AllMusic review by Scott Yanow states: "The music is melodic at times but not boppish, free in spots but not avant-garde. This is a continually infectious and inspiring band".

== Track listing ==
All compositions by Charles Lloyd

1. "One for Joan" - 8:10
2. "Freedom Traveler: Prayer/Journey" - 6:17
3. "Tales" - 5:00
4. "Homeward" - 6:03
5. "A Rose for Booker" - 8:01
6. "Transfusion" - 4:57

== Personnel ==
- Chico Hamilton - drums
- Garnett Brown - trombone
- Charles Lloyd - tenor saxophone, flute
- Gábor Szabó - guitar
- Albert Stinson - bass
