= Gongs East! =

Studio album by Chico Hamilton Quintet
- Released: 1959
- Recorded: December 29–30, 1958; Los Angeles, California
- Genre: Jazz
- Length: 38:15
- Label: Warner Bros. WS 1271

Chico Hamilton chronology
The Chico Hamilton Quintet with Strings Attached (1958)	Gongs East! (1959)	The Three Faces of Chico (1959)

Gongs East! is an album by drummer and bandleader Chico Hamilton's Quintet. It was recorded in 1958 and released on the Warner Bros. label. the album features some of the earliest recordings of Eric Dolphy.

== Reception ==
Professional ratings
Review scores
Source	Rating
AllMusic	4.5/5 stars
The Rolling Stone Jazz Record Guide	4/5 stars

The AllMusic review by Scott Yanow states: "Dolphy has quite a few short solos on this rewarding music... Recommended."

== Track listing ==
1. "Beyond the Blue Horizon" (Richard A. Whiting, W. Franke Harling, Leo Robin) - 2:59
2. "Where I Live" (Gerald Wilson) - 2:57
3. "Gongs East" (Chico Hamilton) - 5:04
4. "I Gave My Love a Cherry" (Traditional) - 4:03
5. "Good Grief, Dennis" (Carlson Smith) - 3:17
6. "Long Ago (and Far Away)" (Jerome Kern, Ira Gershwin) - 3:04
7. "Tuesday at Two" (Wilson) - 3:59
8. "Nature by Emerson" (Fred Katz) - 4:48
9. "Far East" (Nat Pierce) - 4:38
10. "Passion Flower" (Billy Strayhorn) - 3:04

== Personnel ==
- Chico Hamilton - drums, gongs
- Eric Dolphy - alto saxophone, bass clarinet, flute
- Nathan Gershman - cello
- Dennis Budimir - guitar
- Wyatt Ruther - bass
