= Patrick Defossez =

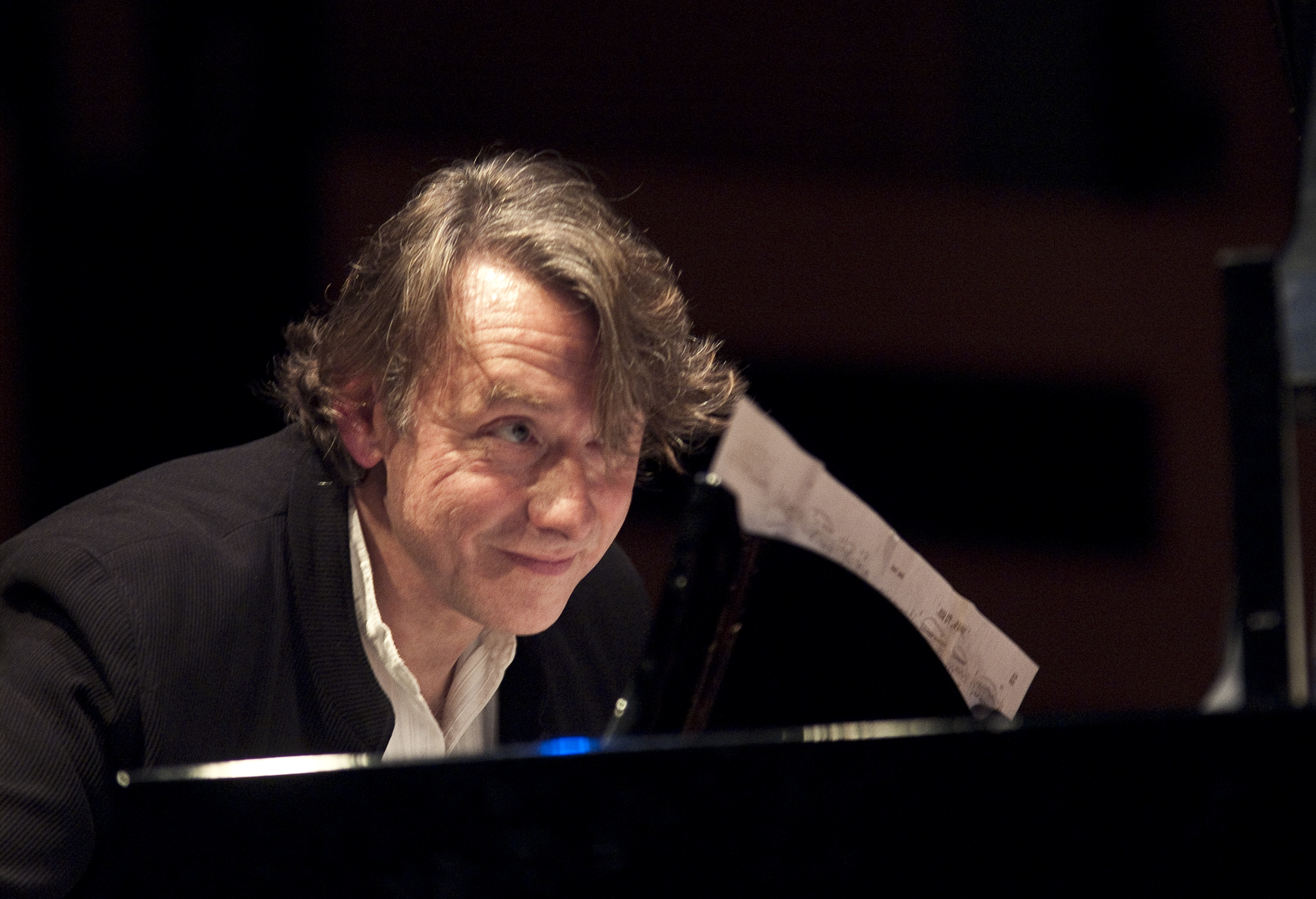
- Patrick Defossez at the piano
- Born: 7 August 1959 (age 67); Valenciennes, France
- Occupations: Composer; Pianist; Pedagogue
- Organizations: Autres voix de piano; Ensemble intercontemporain
- Website: 2dlyres.net

Patrick Defossez (born 7 August 1959 at Valenciennes, France) is a Belgian composer, pianist, and improviser of contemporary classical music. A Belgian citizen, he has lived in France for many years and divides his time between Belgium, Reims and the foothills of the Mont Ventoux.

He is also the musical director of the 2d’Lyres not-for-profit organization, and the Autres Voix de piano collective.

== Studies ==
A classically trained musician, Patrick Defossez cut his teeth first at the Académie de Musique, then at Mons Conservatory, Belgium, where he wrote his first orchestral work in 1977. He then left for the United States in order to work on jazz and improvisation. He perfected his musical techniques at Berklee College, Boston. On his return to Europe, he began working with electroacoustic music and mixed music, especially at the IRCAM music research institute. Under the guidance of Claude Ballif, he rounded his music composition studies off with the unanimous award of the prize for composition.

== Work ==
Patrick Defossez began his musical career in 1985, moving to France at a time when Belgian jazz was going through a very challenging period. Over the years, he put his creative talents as a pianist to work in the contemporary music scene, composing and improvising; played with several jazz bands (trios, quintets) and directed an ensemble featuring a wide range of different instruments which was part of the jazz fusion movement.

It was after being taught by Claude Ballif in mid-1994 that he really embarked on musical composition. He produced a whole series of pieces designed to be played in situ, which were often the result of commissions and personal meetings. These saw him perform in Reims Cathedral (1997), on the banks of the River Meuse (Cascades immobiles with the Septuor de Namureauphones, 2000) and in formats where he could enjoy the experience of blending genres and experiences, as in Rêves, ragas et raves (2001) performed in Nantes with the town's University Choir. To mark the bicentenary of the death of Toussaint Louverture, he wrote the music for an opera, Tous un (2003), based on the libretto by Fabienne Pasquet.

These large-scale endeavours were accompanied by chamber music compositions, which frequently involved working with instrumentalists, such as Du haut... denum digitorium (2000), performed by the bassoonist Pascal Gallois and the percussionist Samuel Favre. This is also how Re-partita /// post-ludio (2006) originated, composed at the request of violinist Jacek Friedrich, a paraphrase-remix of the prelude of the Partita for Violin N°3 by Johann-Sebastian Bach. Patrick Defossez began working on pieces that would break down the barriers between genres and give rise to innovative or hitherto untried formats. For example, two very different approaches he tried were to bring three improvisers into a string ensemble for Vernissage, dialogues et bavardages and to combine electronic sounds with a range of traditional Basque instruments for Chemin d’ombres / Matsu Camin (2006).

Patrick Defossez returned to playing piano solos in 2012. He composed Le livre de... Matin calme, a suite where he reflects upon sound and time, ‘in suspension, repeated, renewed, held in check, infinite’, a score that is ‘turned towards a thousand dawns’.

This exploratory piano work, and the age-old endeavour to conduct a dialogue with other musicians, come together in the project he is currently working on with composer Alain Bonardi, Contemprovisations . Alain Bonardi's objective is to reinterpret the works of twelve contemporary composers: Jacopo Baboni-Schilingi, Alain Bonardi, Régis Campo, Anne-Gabriel Debaecker, Bruno Ducol, Suzanne Giraud, Thierry Huillet, Philippe Manoury, Yan Maresz, Komiko Omura, LeiLei Tian, and Kasper Toeplitz.

== Style ==
Patrick Defossez describes himself as a ‘pluriesthetic’ musician who attaches great importance both to the ‘art’ element of (so-called) contemporary classical music and to the influences derived from improvised music, from jazz and electroacoustic music. The stage environment and the physical lay-out of the venue are important parts of his work and some of his compositions (e.g. Sculpture de Muses in 2012) have been designed for specific locations. His experience as a jazz musician has led him to develop a technique of ‘improvised composition’ in which the written work is subjected to changes in real-time during the course of a concert, allowing for greater spontaneity of performance. This may be driven by purely aural considerations but also by a concern for how the playing of the piano as a visual performance is perceived.

Having studied at the Beaux-Arts, I quickly noticed that I painted music and played sculpture — Patrick Defossez

This breaking down of barriers goes beyond music, towards a form of synesthesia where words, images, sounds and space are components of the musical environment in their own right, a lesson learnt under Claude Ballif. On several occasions he has performed his music in conjunction with visual elements: paintings (Fondation Carzou) or animated works (soundtrack to a silent film), envisioning the concert to be a movement, an imbalance, a meandering, a journey, as much in the physical as in the temporal sense, one that also occurs in our mind's eye.

Patrick Defossez has set to music the writings of several prominent writers. The works of Raymond Queneau (Injectertion) and Allen Ginsberg (Libr’Air) are most well known, but additional inspiration has come from Henry de Montherlant (Inès de Castro), Louis Aragon (La messe noire d’Elsa) and Jean Genet (Le funambule) have also been ‘set to music’ by Patrick Defossez.

Patrick Defossez accords much importance to the crafting of instruments and to the performance gesture, so much so that he has explored the idea of a ‘digital conservatory’ of instrumental techniques.

These ‘meslanges’ are frequently joyful, blending both style and musical timbre, creating two distinct families of works, one of which tends towards the heterogeneous and the incongruous (perhaps drawing on the Belgian surrealist heritage?), while the other is an exploration of the performance gesture and the essence of musical time. In both cases, the performance gesture is crucial, this being the component around which the syntax of musical discourse revolves.

== Autres voix de piano ==
In 2011, he became the musical director of the duo Autres Voix de piano, which he formed with Anne-Gabriel Debaecker. The first important work has been Pourquoi tant de ... ?, a framework-score designed to be modified in line with the guest musicians present. The first version of the work was developed by drummer Simon Goubert and was released as an album, receiving positive reviews.

The duo then paid tribute to sculptor Parvine Curie at the Collégiale Saint-Martin, Angers as musical composition Sculpture de Muses, dance (Mathieu Ducouret), poetry (Yves Jouan and Valérie Rouzeau) and audio-visual performance art (Sylvie de Meurville) played off against each other (2012).

Further on, a new version of the Pourquoi tant de ... ? framework, entitled Quatre = Onze == (7), has been elaborated with saxophonist Daniel Erdmann and trombone player Benny Sluchin, exploring the encounter of improvisation-based and classical practices of interpreting a score. The work was first played in public in October 2013 and will be released as a CD recording at the end of 2015 by the German label NEOS.

During the year 2018, he composes, with the French writer Jean-Bernard Pouy and the visual artist Mathieu Chamagne, an dystopic opera “CO_{2} — Cycle de lieder”, in which the audience is invited to influence an improvised musical sequence by writing narrative counterpoints to the original libretto on electronic devices.

== Teaching career ==
Patrick Defossez also teaches at the Conservatoire de Bayonne.

== Main compositions ==
- 1997 : Puisse la lumière and Déambulation méditative (vocals, Armelle Orieux) for the launch of Reims Cathedral's new system of illumination
- 1998 : Clovis - Naissance de la France et Jeanne d’Arc au bûcher, commissioned by Reims Cathedral
- 1999 : Vernissage, dialogues et bavardages for 19 solo strings and improvisers
- 2000 :
  - Cascades immobiles for 24 musicians and an ensemble of floating sound sculptures
  - Du Haut... Denum digitorium for bassoon and timpani
- 2001 : Rêves, ragas et raves for symphony orchestra, jazz big band and choir
- 2002 : Lignes et sculptures, for musical ensemble and electronic music
- 2003 : Tous un, opera, vocals and electronic music (commissioned to mark the bicentenary of the death of Toussaint Louverture)
- 2005 : Libr’Air, for various jazz ensemble formats
- 2006 :
  - Soli d’ombres / Matsu - Camin, for traditional Basque instruments and electronic music
  - Concerto pour train et piano, sound track for the Garcia Moreno film ‘El tren fantasma’ (1927), for piano, small orchestra and electronic music
  - Le présent oublié, for electric jazz quartet with surround sound diffusion effect
  - Re-partita /// post-ludio, for violin, piano and electronic music
- 2009 :
  - Matin calme, for piano
  - Adaptation of Children's corner by Claude Debussy for two pianos
- 2010 : Three tales of blues for piano, viola and electronic music
- 2011 : 108 coups de cloches..., for piano and electronic music
- 2013 : Quatre = Onze == (7), for piano, saxophone, trombone tenor, euphonium duplex and electroacoustic music
- 2015 :
  - Les Sept Vitraux du Château Intérieur, for 2 violins, 2 cellos and bass clarinet
  - Flashs for chamber ensemble (flute, clarinet, saxophone, violin, cello, voice, drums), piano and electroacoustic music | poem by Myriam Blom : Ein Wind weht
- 2016 :
  - Cadenza Onirica, suite for small ensemble with visual creations by Sylvie de Meurville, Ysabelle de Maison de Maisonneuve and Gabriel Sobin
- 2018 :
  - CO_{2} — Cycle de lieder, interactive and visual intermedia opera with visual creation by Mathieu Chamagne

=== Filmography ===
- 2006 : Concerto for train and piano, music for El tren fantasma, a film by Gabriel García Moreno (1927)
- 2014 : To me it will always be the Calliope, music for the film by Georges Collinet

=== Selected discography ===
- Pourquoi tant de ... ?, Leo Records (2011)
- Sculpture de Muses, published by the Collégiale Saint-Martin d'Angers (2012)
- Quatre = onze == [7], Autres voix de piano + Daniel Erdmann + Benny Sluchin, released by NEOS Music (2014)
