= Sue Terry =

- Born: 1959 (age 66–67)
- Genres: Jazz
- Occupation: Musician
- Instrument: Saxophone
- Years active: 1980s–present
- Label: Qi Note
- Website: suterry.com

Sue Terry (born 1959) is an American jazz saxophonist and composer.

While a student at the Hartt School in Hartford, Connecticut, Terry was a protégé of saxophonist Jackie McLean. McLean encouraged her to move to New York City, where she was later mentored by Clifford Jordan, Junior Cook and Barry Harris. They gave her the nickname "Sweet Sue". She now uses the spelling "Su Terry."

After moving to New York City in 1982, Terry became a featured soloist with bands led by Charlie Persip, Clifford Jordan, Walter Bishop Jr., and Jaki Byard. She worked with George Duke, Dr. John, Barry Harris, Al Jarreau, Chaka Khan, Mike Longo, Irene Reid, Hilton Ruiz, Billy Taylor, Clark Terry, Teri Thornton, and Howard Johnson.

She is the author of Inside the Mind of a Musician, For The Curious, and I Was a Jazz Musician for the FBI. /> She wrote the instruction books Practice Like the Pros, Step One: Play Alto Sax, Step One: Play Tenor Sax, and Step One: Play Clarinet.

== Discography ==
As Leader/Composer:

- SU TERRY “GREATEST HITS” Qi Note Records QN 9777
- SWEET SUE TERRY "LIVE AT THE DEER HEAD INN" Deer Head Records 2015
- SWEET SUE TERRY "GILLY’S CAPER" Qi Note Records QN 8736
- SWEET SUE TERRY "PINK SLIMY WORM" Qi Note Records QN 8726
- SWEET SUE TERRY “BANDLEADER 101” (digital release) Qi Note Records QN 8767

As Co-Leader/Composer:

- PEGGY STERN & SWEET SUE TERRY “THE ART OF THE DUO” Estrella Music EM730
- TIM PRICE & SWEET SUE TERRY "THE BLUE.SEUM PROJECT" Qi Note Records QN 8746

As Soloist:

- SCOT ALBERTSON “VIBINATION”
- SCOT ALBERTSON “WITH EVERY NOTE, A STEP”
- SCOT ALBERTSON “FATE REVEALED BY DESIGN” PAUL AMMENDOLA "LET THE WIND DANCE" Sebastian Records 327001
- BAD ASS FREAKS “NEIGHBORS” Allzeit Music
- JAKI BYARD "PHANTASIES I" Soul Note 121 175-1
- CUBANO "L’ESSENCE CUBANO" Mini Records 1153
- DEBBIE DE COUDREAUX "HAVE A LITTLE PARIS ON ME" DLL Productions
- DIVA "SOMETHING’S COMING" Perfect Sound 1216
- EXODUS "VICTOIRE" Sunshine Records 8034
- EXODUS "LE ZOUK" Disques Esperance 17901
- YA YA FORNIER w/ DAVID MURRAY "BEARCAT" Random Chance RCD-9
- RICARDO FRANCK (TI PLUME) "MELI MELO" DiskHaiti CDDH 30003
- FRED HO "NIGHT VISION" Autonomedia (Book/CD)
- DERWYN HOLDER ENSEMBLE "TIME BEING" Neen Records N103
- CLIFFORD JORDAN "DOWN THROUGH THE YEARS" Milestone 9197-2
- TULLY McGREGOR "MOURNING DOVE" Erixna Records ER4779
- JOE McMAHON, JR. "SECONDHAND HEART FOR SALE" Sharla Records SHACD-1916
- JOE McMAHON, JR. "YOU’RE SOMETHING TO LIVE FOR" Sharla Records SHACD-1917
- MINI ALL STARS "CHANGE LE BEAT" Mini Records 1166
- MINI ALL STARS "CHANGE ENCORE LE BEAT" Mini Records S119
- MINI ALL STARS "PIROULI" Mini Records 1169
- CHARLI PERSIP & SUPERBAND "NO DUMMIES ALLOWED" Soul Note 121 179-2
- JEFF RAHEB "TOPAZ UNDER MOON" TPZ 1001
- HILTON RUIZ “HILTON’S LAST NOTE” HILTON RUIZ MUSIC 112280
- HILTON RUIZ “GOIN’ BACK TO NEW ORLEANS” M27 EP
- PEGGY STERN “Z OCTET” Estrella Music
- MICHAEL JEFRY STEVENS “SONGBOOK” MJS Productions
- TI MANNO "BAMBOCHE CREOLE" Chancy Records 8029
- JACK WOODBRIDGE “PICTURE THIS”
- JACK WOODBRIDGE “JACK OF HEARTS”

As Composer:

- JOHN MASTROIANNI / SHERRIE MARICLE "THE TIME BEING" Jazz Alliance 10019
- BOBBY SANABRIA AFRO CUBAN JAZZ DREAM BIG BAND "LIVE AND IN CLAVE" Arabesque AJ0149 *Grammy nominated*

Compilations:

- SWEET SUE TERRY “GREATEST HITS” Qi Note Records QN 9777
- VARIOUS ARTISTS "SAX IN THE CITY" Apria Records 072524
- VARIOUS ARTISTS "JAZZ IN THE WILDE" Uh Oh 0005
- MINI ALL STARS "GREATEST HITS" MSRD 1001 MINI ALL STARS "GREATEST HITS Vol. II" MSRD 1007
- MINI All STARS "S.O.S." MSRD 1228

Instructional CDs:

- SUE TERRY "PRACTICE LIKE THE PROS" Music Sales Corp.
- SUE TERRY "STEP ONE: PLAY ALTO SAXOPHONE" Music Sales Corp.
- SUE TERRY "STEP ONE: PLAY TENOR SAXOPHONE" Music Sales Corp.
- SUE TERRY "STEP ONE: PLAY CLARINET" Music Sales Corp.
