= Renato D'Aiello =

Renato D’Aiello
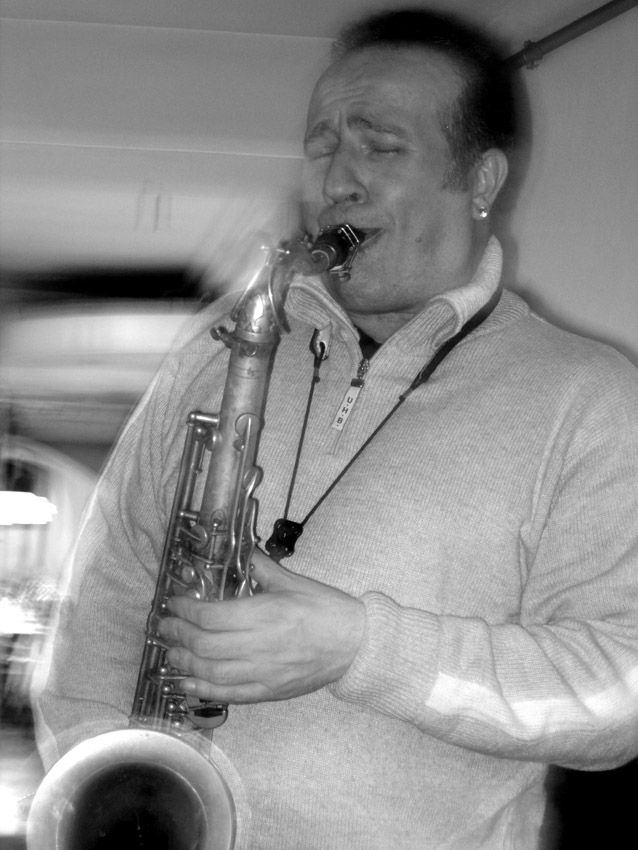
- Renato D’Aiello in 2006

Background information
- Born: 21 March 1959; Naples, Italy
- Genres: Jazz
- Occupation: Musician
- Instrument: Saxophone
- Years active: 1986–present
- Labels: Spotlite, 33 Jazz
- Website: renatodaiello.net

Renato D'Aiello is an Italian saxophonist who lives in the United Kingdom.

== Albums ==
Like Someone in Love was recorded with Damon Brown and features seven songs, among them well-known titles like Like Someone in Love and I Remember You.

Of his record Sintetico, with Nicola Muresu on bass, Keith Copeland on drums and Andrea Pozza on piano, the Guardian critic wrote: "D'Aiello's weighty, behind-the-beat sound shows how a poetic imagination can rekindle a long-gone style without nostalgia".

== Discography ==
As leader

- Introducing (Spotlite, 2001)
- The Invisible Session (Schema, 2006)
- Sintetico (33 Jazz, 2007)
- Between Two Worlds (33 Jazz, 2013)
- Satori: The Angel (33 Jazz, 2015)

As sideman

- Tenorama John Williams (Spotlite, 2003)
- More Questions Than Answers, Louise Gibbs (33 Jazz, 2005)
- Ballads, Nicola Muresu, Bruno Montrone (33 Jazz, 2014)
- Blues on the Run, Damon Brown
- A Night in London, Rayko León (2018)
- Entre Boleros in London, Gerson Galván (2019)
- A Day in Las Palmas, Rayko León (2021)

As guest

- Ohm Guru – Funk My Ass (1995)
- DJ Rodriguez – World Wide Funk (1998)
- Paolo Fedreghini & Marco Bianchi – Circus in C Minor (2004)
- Bobby Blanco & Miki Moto – Black Sugar (2005)
- The Invisible Session – To the Powerful (2005)
