= Def La Desh & The Fresh Witness =

Dutch musical group

Def La Desh and the Fresh Witness
- Origin: Netherlands
- Genres: Dance music
- Label: CNR Records
- Past members: Esther Munster; Natasha Van Der Weerd; Wendy Wright

The Dutch musical group Def La Desh and the Fresh Witness was composed of Esther van der Weerd, Natasja Munster and singer Wendy Alane Wright. They produced the top 40 hits "Check Out The Ska" and "Feel The Rhythm". Def La Desh and the Fresh Witness was one of the first female rap groups to combine rap with vocals. Groups like TLC followed suit.

== Background ==
Esther Van Der Weerd and Natasha Munster began their careers in Enschede, the Netherlands performing in local fairs. On the other side of the world, lead singer Wendy Alane Wright, born in New York City, was singing in talent shows and doing backing vocals for various artists. In 1990, CNR records A&R executive Ronald van Der Meyden and hit producers Quincy Lizer and Cooly D brought these 3 performers together in Europe to form Def La Desh and the Fresh Witness. King mc also did writing for the group and some production. Their 1991 debut album 2 Timin' contained the popular hit single "Feel The Rhythm", which reached #20 in the Nederlands Top 40 Charts. Its video was in rotation on music networks like BET, MTV and VH1. Known for their new jack sound, the group enjoyed commercial success in the early 1990s. “Feel The Rhythm,” “Check Out The Ska” and “Tear It Up” appeared in numerous television shows and on numerous compilation CDs worldwide.

After Def La Desh, lead singer Wendy Alane Wright went on to work with many notables from 1999 to 2006, including Candy Dulfer, Tony Scott, Johnny Lang, Jeff Trachta, Philip Michael Thomas, Billie Myers, Linda De Mol and blues legend Solomon Burke. She toured with Wayne Brady and opened for Royce Rose, Basic Black, The Four Tops and Nell Carter. She wrote and co-produced the song "Feel Good" for Tatjana Simic which was a pop hit throughout Europe. Wendy Alane Wright has released three solo Cds; "As I Am" (2007), "Real Love" (2007) and "I want Your Love" (2006).

== Discography ==
- "Check Out The Ska", CD maxi-single (BITE Records, 1990)
- "Feel The Rhythm", vinyl (BITE Records, 1991); CD maxi-single (BITE Records, 1991); vinyl (Disques Vogue, 1991)
- 2 Timin' , CD album (BITE Records, 1991)
- "Tear It Up", vinyl (BITE Records, 1992); CD maxi-single (BITE Records, 1992)
- "Sunshine", vinyl single (Polydor Records, 1993)

== Tracks Appear On ==
- “Feel The Rhythm” Hardcore Dancefloor 2xCD (Dino Entertainment)
- “Check Out The Ska” Turn Up The Bass - Volume 9 (Arcade, 1990)
- “Check Out The Ska” Turn Up The Bass 5 2xLP (Arcade, 1990)
- “Feel The Rhythm” Chart Break-Outs Volume III CD (BITE Records, 1992)
- “Feel The Rhythm” Turn Up The Bass Rap - Volume 4 CD (Arcade, 1992)
- “2 Timin” Turn Up The Bass - Volume 20 CD (Arcade, 1992)
- “2 Timin” Turn Up The Bass - Volume 20 Cass (Arcade, 1992)
- “Feel The Rhythm” Turn Up The Bass Megamix 1992 (Part 2) CD (Arcade, 1992)
- “Tear It Up” Juliana's Tokyo Vol. 4 CD (Avex Trax, 1993)
- “Tear It Up” Mindblowing 4 CD (CNR Music (Sweden), 1993)
- “Tear It Up” The Full Unity Megamix CD (Indisc, 1993
- “Tear It Up” Remasters Volume 1 (12") (Remasters, 2007)
