= The Three Faces of Chico =

Studio album by Chico Hamilton Quintet
- Released: 1959
- Recorded: February 25, 1959; Los Angeles
- Genre: Jazz
- Label: Warner Bros. WS 1344

Chico Hamilton chronology
Gongs East! (1958)	The Three Faces of Chico (1959)	That Hamilton Man (1959)

The Three Faces of Chico is an album by the drummer and bandleader Chico Hamilton, recorded in 1959 and released on the Warner Bros. label.

== Reception ==
Professional ratings
Review scores
Source	Rating
AllMusic	4/5 stars
The Penguin Guide to Jazz (compilation)	3/4 stars
The Virgin Encyclopedia of Jazz	3/5 stars

The editors of AllMusic awarded the album 4 stars, and reviewer Bruce Eder called it "one of the most diversely textured and wide-ranging of all Chico Hamilton albums," as well as "a fine showcase" for Hamilton "as a triple-threat artist: drummer extraordinaire..., vocalist..., and, of course, leader."

A writer for Billboard called the recording "a versatile album with jockey appeal," and wrote: "In addition to his flashy virtuosity as a drummer on this LP, Hamilton displays an interesting vocal talent... his quintet... swings effectively."

== Track listing ==
All compositions by Chico Hamilton except as indicated

1. "Miss Movement" (Eric Dolphy) – 2:16
2. "She's Funny That Way" (Richard A. Whiting, Neil Moret) – 2:49
3. "Trinkets" – 4:27
4. "More Than You Know" (Vincent Youmans, Billy Rose, Edward Eliscu) – 5:53
5. "The Best Things in Life Are Free" (Buddy DeSylva, Lew Brown, Ray Henderson) – 2:37
6. "Where or When" (Richard Rodgers, Lorenz Hart) – 2:25
7. "Happy Little Dance" – 2:14
8. "Newport News" (Kenny Dorham) – 4:37
9. "I Don't Know Why (I Just Do)" (Fred E. Ahlert, Roy Turk) – 2:56
10. "No Speak No English, Man" – 0:26

== Personnel ==
- Chico Hamilton – drums, vocals
- Eric Dolphy – alto saxophone, bass clarinet, flute
- Paul Horn – alto saxophone (tracks 2, 5, 6 & 9)
- Buddy Collette – tenor saxophone (tracks 2, 5, 6 & 9)
- Bill Green – baritone saxophone (tracks 2, 5, 6 & 9)
- Nathan Gershman – cello
- Dennis Budimir – guitar
- Wyatt Ruther – double bass
