= Patrick Yandall =

American jazz musician

Patrick Norman Yandall (born September 5, 1959, in Fort Bragg, North Carolina, United States) is an American smooth jazz guitarist.

== Background ==
He was raised in Bay City, Michigan, and is a 1977 graduate of T.L. Handy High School in Bay City. He attended Central Michigan University. His song "Mr. Fattburger" appeared in the film Fruitvale Station. His song "Who's the Bossa" from his album Samoa Soul appeared in the film War, Inc.. Yandall's music has appeared on television and news broadcasts. The single "Tower of Soul" from his album The Window spent five weeks at No. 1 on the Smooth Jazz Now chart and reached No. 1 on the Live 365 smooth jazz radio chart monitored by Radio Wave.

His album From the Ashes (Apria, 2004) featured Randy Brecker, Will Lee, and Joel Rosenblatt. He has been featured in Jazziz, Smooth & Soul, and Smooth Jazz News. His album Eyes of Mars (2005) was No. 6 for the year on JazzLynx and was featured in Jazz Times magazine as one of the top albums of the season. Yandall is a session musician in San Diego, Los Angeles, New York, and New Jersey. His work has appeared on The Weather Channel's Local on the 8s segments.

Performing live, Yandall has been able to achieve the status of being a festival favorite throughout the United States.

== Career ==
Yandall's album Rouge River was one of the seven albums nominated in the "Best Jazz Album" category at the 2021 San Diego Music Awards.

Yandall was one the artists with multiple nominations at the 2022 San Diego Music Awards. His album Chasing the Lights was one of the seven listed in the "Album of the Year" category. It was also nominated in the Best Jazz or Blues Album category.

After the release of Yandall's album, Blues Alley, he was set to tour starting on December 18 to promote it.

== Discography ==
Title	Year	Label
That Feels Nice!	1992/1994	Indie/EPD
A Lasting Embrace	1997	Brainchild
Of Two Cities	2000	Zangi
Back to the Groove	2001	Zangi
From the Ashes	2003	Apria Records
Eyes of Mars	2005	Apria
Samoa Soul	2006	Zangi
New York Blues	2007	Zangi
Laws of Groovity	2008	Zangi
A New Day	2009	Zangi
Going For One	2009	Zangi
Christmas San Diego Style	2010	Zangi
The Window	2011	Innervision Records
One Hour Blues	2011	Zangi Records
Acoustic Dreamscape	2012	Zangi Records
Soul Grind	2013	Innervision Records
Blonde Telepathy	2014	Zangi Records
My Christmas Prayer	2014	Zangi Records
Ethos	2016	Zangi Records
A Journey Home	2017	Zangi Records
10 South Riverside	2018	Zangi Records
When Its Hip	2019	Zangi Records
Jazz On the Vine	2020	Zangi Records
Rouge River	2020	Zangi Records
Someday Somewhere	2021 Feb 2	Patrick Yandall
Nylon Expressions	2021 Apr 17	Patrick Yandall
Chasing the Light	2021 Aug 3	Patrick Yandall
Stratophunk	2022 July 1	Zangi Records
