= Passin' Thru (Chico Hamilton album) =

Studio album by Chico Hamilton
- Released: February 1963
- Recorded: September 18 & 20, 1962
- Studio: Van Gelder Studio, Englewood Cliffs, NJ
- Genre: Jazz
- Length: 37:44
- Label: Impulse!
- Producer: Bob Thiele

Chico Hamilton chronology
Drumfusion (1960)	Passin' Thru (1963)	A Different Journey (1963)

Passin' Thru is an album by American jazz drummer Chico Hamilton featuring performances recorded in September 1962 and released in February 1963 on the Impulse! label.

== Reception ==
Professional ratings
Review scores
Source	Rating
Down Beat	4.5/5 stars
Allmusic	4.5/5 stars
The Rolling Stone Jazz Record Guide	4/5 stars

The Allmusic review by Scott Yanow awarded the album 4½ stars, with Scott Yanow's review stating: "Drummer Chico Hamilton's debut on Impulse featured his fifth Quintet, an advanced hard bop unit that sometimes hinted a little at the avant-garde... this was a major band".

== Track listing ==
All compositions by Charles Lloyd except as noted

1. "Passin' Thru" – 8:16
2. "The Second Time Around" (Sammy Cahn, Jimmy Van Heusen) – 3:11
3. "El Toro" (Chico Hamilton, Charles Lloyd, Gabor Szabo) – 4:39
4. "Transfusion" – 2:42
5. "Lady Gabor" (Gábor Szabó) – 13:15
6. "Lonesome Child" – 5:41
- Recorded at Rudy Van Gelder Studio in Englewood Cliffs, New Jersey, on September 18, 1962 (tracks 1–4), and September 20, 1962 (tracks 5 & 6)

== Personnel ==
- Chico Hamilton – drums
- George Bohanon – trombone; percussion (3)
- Charles Lloyd – tenor saxophone (1,2,4,6), flute (3,5)
- Gábor Szabó – guitar
- Albert Stinson – bass
