= Nathan Gershman =

American cellist and session musician

- Born: November 29, 1917; Philadelphia
- Died: September 13, 2008 (aged 90); North Hollywood
- Genres: Jazz

Nathan Gershman, born Nathan Gerschman (November 29, 1917, Philadelphia – September 13, 2008, North Hollywood) was an American cellist and session musician who played in popular music, jazz, and classical idioms.

Gershman was the brother of violinist Paul Gershman, and received classical training at the Curtis Institute of Music, graduating in 1940. From 1940 to 1947 he played with the Cleveland Orchestra, then moved to New York City to work as a studio musician, working in the same capacity in Los Angeles after 1954. In 1957 he replaced Fred Katz as cellist in Chico Hamilton's band, playing with Hamilton until 1961. As a jazz musician, he also worked in the 1970s with Nat Adderley, Gábor Szabó, and Ronnie Laws. He was frequently active as a session player and studio musician for television, theater, and recordings in and around Los Angeles from the 1960s into the 1990s, and played on albums by David Axelrod, The Beach Boys, Geronimo Black, David Bromberg, Neil Diamond, Lee Hazlewood, Wayne Henderson, Van Dyke Parks, Esther Phillips, and Pleasure.
