= Chico Hamilton =

American jazz drummer and bandleader (1921–2013)

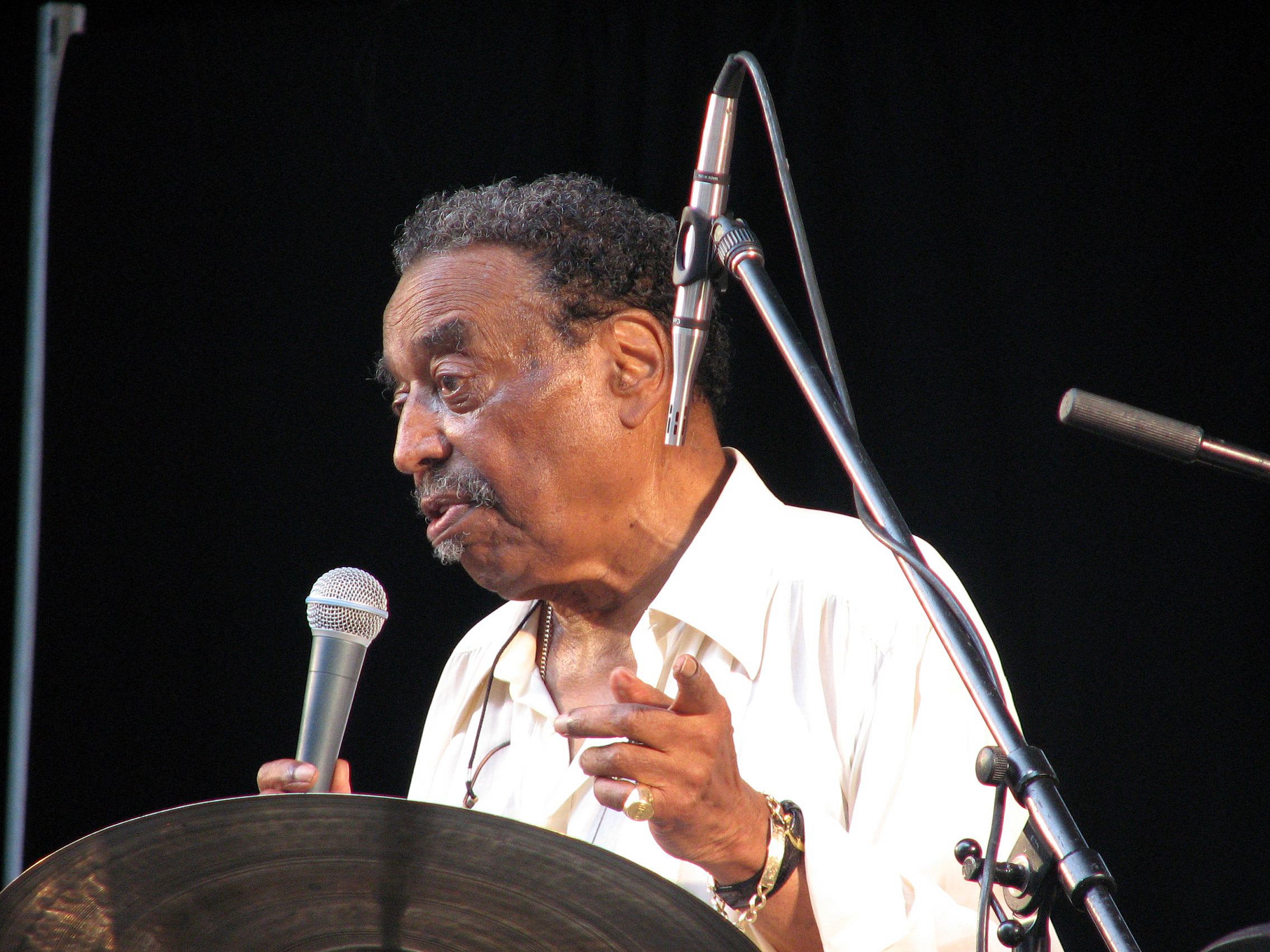
- Chico Hamilton appearing at the Charlie Parker Jazz Festival in Tompkins Square Park, New York City, August 26, 2007

Background information
- Born: Foreststorn Hamilton; September 20, 1921; Los Angeles, California, U.S.
- Died: November 25, 2013 (aged 92) New York, New York, U.S.
- Genres: Cool jazz, free jazz, soul jazz, hard bop, jazz-funk, boogaloo
- Occupation: Musician
- Instrument: Drums

Foreststorn "Chico" Hamilton (September 20, 1921 – November 25, 2013) was an American jazz drummer and bandleader. He came to prominence as sideman for Lester Young, Gerry Mulligan, Count Basie, and Lena Horne. Hamilton became a bandleader, first with a quintet featuring the cello as a lead instrument, an unusual choice for a jazz band in the 1950s, and subsequently leading bands that performed cool jazz, post bop, and jazz fusion.

== Biography ==
=== Early life and career ===
Foreststorn Hamilton was born in Los Angeles, California, one of three brothers, one of whom was actor Bernie Hamilton.

Hamilton started his career in a band with Charles Mingus, Illinois Jacquet, Ernie Royal, Dexter Gordon, Buddy Collette and Jack Kelso before he had finished high school. Engagements with Lionel Hampton, Slim & Slam, T-Bone Walker, Lester Young, Count Basie, Duke Ellington, Charlie Barnet, Billy Eckstine, Nat King Cole, Sammy Davis Jr., Billie Holiday, Gerry Mulligan and Lena Horne established his career.

Hamilton appeared in You'll Never Get Rich (1941) as part of the backing group supporting Fred Astaire. Hamilton also performed on the soundtrack of the Bing Crosby and Bob Hope film Road to Bali (1952).

=== Bandleader ===
He recorded his first album as leader in 1955 with George Duvivier (double bass) and Howard Roberts (guitar) for Pacific Jazz. In the same year Hamilton formed an unusual quintet in Los Angeles, featuring cello, flute/saxes/clarinet, guitar, bass and drums. The quintet has been described as one of the last important West Coast jazz bands.

The original personnel included flutist/saxophonist/clarinetist Buddy Collette, guitarist Jim Hall, cellist Fred Katz and bassist Jim Aton, who was later replaced by Carson Smith. Hamilton continued to tour, using different personnel, from 1957 to 1960. A version of the quintet including flutist Paul Horn was featured in the film Sweet Smell of Success (in which he has a small speaking role in a scene with Tony Curtis) in 1957 and one including Eric Dolphy appeared in the film Jazz on a Summer's Day (1960), set at the 1958 Newport Jazz Festival.

Hamilton revamped his group in 1961 with Charles Lloyd, Gábor Szabó, George Bohanon and Albert Stinson, playing what has been described as chamber jazz, with "a moderate avant-gardism." The group recorded for Columbia, Reprise and Impulse Records and also recorded the soundtrack for the industrial film Litho in 1962, the first American film to be shown behind the Iron Curtain. Hamilton formed a commercial and film production company in 1965, and went on to score the feature films Repulsion (1965), Mr. Ricco (1975), Coonskin (1975), By Design (1982), the television programs Portrait of Willie Mays and Gerald McBoing-Boing, and scored hundreds of commercials for TV and radio.

In 1986 Hamilton formed his sextet Chico Hamilton and the Young Altos featuring Kenneth Lampl, Eric Person, and Marc Bernstein. The group performed at the 1986 JVC Jazz Festival, the Apollo Theater, and Lincoln Center for the Performing Arts.

=== Later career and death ===
In 2001, Hamilton released Foreststorn featuring Euphoria with Cary DeNigris on guitar, Paul Ramsey on bass, Eric Lawrence on alto and soprano saxes and Evan Schwam on tenor sax, alongside notable guests. In August of that year, he performed My Funny Valentine: A Tribute to Chico Hamilton at Lincoln Center.

In 1997, Hamilton received the New School University Jazz and Contemporary Music Programs' Beacons in Jazz Award in recognition for his "significant contribution to the evolution of Jazz". In 2002, he was awarded the WLIU-FM Radio Lifetime Achievement Award. At the IAJE in NYC January 2004, he was awarded a NEA Jazz Master Fellowship. In December 2006, Congress confirmed the nomination of Hamilton to the President's Council on the Arts. In 2007, he received a Living Legend Jazz Award as part of The Kennedy Center's Jazz in Our Time Festival, as well as being awarded a Doctor of Fine Arts from The New School.

In 2006, Hamilton released Joyous Shout! in celebration of his 85th birthday. In 2007, he released Hamiltonia, sampling his original compositions from the four albums released in 2006. Over the years, Hamilton had a series of dance successes, including his signature song "Conquistadors" from his 1960s Impulse album El Chico, and the Brazilian-influenced song "Strut" from his 1980 Elektra album, Nomad.

In 2002, a track titled "For Mods Only" from his 1966 Impulse! Records album The Dealer, was included on the Thievery Corporation's Sounds from the Verve Hi-Fi. In 2006, Rong Music released the 12-inch vinyl Kerry's Caravan by Mudd and Hamilton, with remixes from Ray Mang. Several remixes of Hamilton's recordings were released in the late 2000s. He released Twelve Tones of Love on Joyous Shout! in 2009. In March 2011, he had a long recording session, resulting in 28 new tracks with his Euphoria group. Following a health setback in 2010, he and the group began weekly rehearsals at Hamilton's Penthouse A; which brought together the material which would comprise Revelation, an 11-track CD, released in 2011. For the Dutch Radio Westerwolde he made a Radio Jingle for The Toppyjazz Radio Show.

Hamilton died aged 92 on November 25, 2013, in Manhattan.

== Discography ==
=== As leader/co-leader ===
- 1953–1954: Chico Hamilton Trio (Pacific Jazz, 1955)[10" LP]
- 1955: Chico Hamilton Quintet featuring Buddy Collette (Pacific Jazz, 1956) – partially live
- 1955: The Original Chico Hamilton Quintet (World Pacific, 1960) – live
- 1955: Live at the Strollers (Fresh Sound, 2008) – live
- 1954, 1956: Chico Hamilton Quintet in Hi Fi (Pacific Jazz, 1956)
- 1953–1956: Chico Hamilton Trio (Pacific Jazz, 1956) – reissue of LP-17 plus 4 additional tracks
- 1956: Chico Hamilton Quintet (Pacific Jazz, 1957) – live
- 1957?: Sweet Smell of Success (Decca, 1957) – film soundtrack
- 1957?: Delightfully Modern (Jazztone, 1957) – split album with the Laurindo Almeida Quartet; Pacific Jazz material
- 1958: South Pacific in Hi-Fi (World Pacific, 1958)
- 1958: Chico Hamilton Trio Introducing Freddie Gambrell (World Pacific, 1958)
- 1958: The Original Ellington Suite (Pacific Jazz, 2000)
- 1958: The Chico Hamilton Quintet with Strings Attached (Warner Bros., 1959)
- 1958: Gongs East! (Warner Bros., 1959)
- 1954–1959: The Complete Pacific Jazz Recordings of the Chico Hamilton Quintet (Mosaic, 1997) [9LP/6CD box set]
- 1959: Ellington Suite (World Pacific, 1959)
- 1959: The Three Faces of Chico (Warner Bros., 1959)
- 1959: That Hamilton Man (Sesac, 1959)
- 1960: Bye Bye Birdie-Irma La Douce (Columbia, 1961)
- 1960 The Chico Hamilton Special (Columbia, 1961)
- 1962: Drumfusion (Columbia, 1962)
- 1962: Passin' Thru (Impulse!, 1963)
- 1962: Transfusion (Studio West/V.S.O.P., 1990)
- 1963: A Different Journey (Reprise, 1963)
- 1963: Man from Two Worlds (Impulse!, 1964)
- 1965: Chic Chic Chico (Impulse!, 1965)
- 1965: El Chico (Impulse!, 1966)
- 1966: The Further Adventures of El Chico (Impulse!, 1966)
- 1966: The Dealer (Impulse!, 1966)
- 1968: The Gamut (Solid State, 1968)
- 1968: The Head Hunters (Solid State, 1969)
- 1970: El Exigente: The Demanding One (Flying Dutchman/RCA, 1970)
- 1973: The Master (Enterprise/Stax, 1974)
- 1973: Montreux Festival (Stax, 1974) – live album shared with Albert King and Little Milton
- 1975: Peregrinations (Blue Note, 1975)
- 1976: Chico Hamilton and the Players (Blue Note, 1976)
- 1977?: Catwalk (Mercury, 1977)
- 1979: Reaching for the Top (Nautilus, 1980)
- 1980: Nomad (Elektra, 1980)
- 1988: Euphoria (Swallow, 1989)
- 1989: The Original Chico Hamilton Quintet: Reunion (Soul Note, 1991)
- 1990: Arroyo with Euphoria (Soul Note, 1991)
- 1992: Trio! (Soul Note, 1993)
- 1992: My Panamanian Friend (The Music of Eric Dolphy) (Soul Note, 1994)
- 1993: Dreams Come True with Andrew Hill (Joyous Shout!, 2008)
- 1993: Dancing to a Different Drummer (Soul Note, 1994)
- 1994: Live @ Artpark (Joyous Shout!, 2008) – live
- 1999: Timely (All Points Jazz, 1999)
- 2000–2001: Foreststorn (Koch, 2001)
- 2002: Thoughts of... (Koch, 2002)
- 2002–2005: Juniflip (Joyous Shout!, 2006)
- 2005: Believe (Joyous Shout!, 2006)
- 2005–2006: 6th Avenue Romp (Joyous Shout!, 2006)
- 2005: Heritage (Joyous Shout!, 2006)
- 2007: The Alternative Dimensions of El Chico (Joyous Shout!, 2007)
- 2007: It's About Time (Joyous Shout!, 2008)
- 2008: Twelve Tones of Love (Joyous Shout!, 2009)
- 2011?: Euphoric (Joyous Shout!, 2011)
- 2011: Revelation (Joyous Shout!, 2011)
- 2013: The Inquiring Mind (Joyous Shout!, 2014) – posthumous release

=== As sideman ===
With Fred Katz

- Zen: The Music of Fred Katz (Pacific Jazz, 1957) – rec. 1956
- Soul° Cello (Decca, 1958)

With Gerry Mulligan

- Gerry Mulligan Quartet Volume 1 (Pacific Jazz, 1952)
- California Concerts (Pacific Jazz, 1955) – live
- Gene Norman Presents the Original Gerry Mulligan Tentet and Quartet (GNP, 1997) – compilation rec. 1953

With others

- Louis Armstrong, Louis Armstrong and His Friends (Flying Dutchman/Amsterdam, 1970)
- Buddy Collette, Tanganyika (Dig, 1956)
- Paul Horn, House of Horn (Dot, 1957) - credited as "Forest Thorn"
- John Lewis, Grand Encounter (Pacific Jazz, 1956)
- Ken Nordine, Word Jazz (Dot, 1957) - credited as "Forest Horn"
- Gábor Szabó, Spellbinder (Impulse!, 1966)
