= Kissed by Nature =

Studio album by Eliane Elias
- Released: September 24, 2002
- Genre: Contemporary jazz
- Length: 64:41
- Label: RCA/Bluebird
- Producer: Eliane Elias, Marc Johnson

Eliane Elias chronology
Everything I Love (2000)	Kissed by Nature (2002)	Brazilian Classics (2003)

Professional ratings
Review scores
Source	Rating
AllMusic	3/5 stars
All About Jazz	3.5/5 stars
The Penguin Guide to Jazz Recordings	3/4 stars
The Virgin Encyclopedia of Jazz	4/5 stars

Kissed by Nature is the fifteenth studio album by Brazilian jazz pianist Eliane Elias. The album was released on September 24, 2002 via RCA/Bluebird label.

== Reception ==
Alex Henderson of Allmusic wrote "Kissed by Nature" is her first RCA release. For the most part, this is a vocal album, although Elias does get in some likable solos—and this time, she emphasizes relaxed, laid-back Brazilian pop-jazz. Kissed by Nature is essentially Brazilian easy listening, although it isn't bloodless elevator Muzak; even at her most commercial, Elias probably has too much substance and integrity for the average smooth jazz/NAC station. One thing she doesn't have is a great voice. While Elias is an excellent pianist, her voice is undeniably thin—as a vocalist, she doesn't have a fantastic range by any means." A review by Billboard commented, "The overall mood of Kissed is one of subdued beauty, expressive melodic lines, and very integrated (rather than solo-driven) ensemble work between piano, bass, and drums/percussion."

Dour Ramsey of JazzTimes stated "Pianist Eliane Elias’ easy Brazilian atmospherics on much of Kissed by Nature resemble Gary McFarland’s pop-jazz successes of the 1960s, Soft Samba and The In Sound. The title piece, with English lyrics and a vocal by Elias, sets the comfortable tone. Many of the tracks have an overdubbed choir of Eliases singing in Portuguese. All of them feature her excellent piano work, supported by bassist Marc Johnson, with drummers Joey Baron and Paulo Braga alternating."

== Track list ==
1. Kissed by Nature – 5:29
2. A Volta – 5:49
3. Manhattan – 4:19
4. Apareceu – 5:21
5. Pererê – 4:50
6. Where Did You Go – 4:34
7. Balancê – 4:56
8. Djavan Medley (Fato Consumado/Dobrado) – 5:27
9. October – 5:32
10. September – 4:34
11. Luar – 4:27
12. Kissed by Nature (Remix, Bossacucanova) – 4:42
13. Balancê (Remix Bossacucanova) – 4:48

== Personnel ==
- Eliane Elias – piano, vocals
- Randy Brecker – trumpet, flugelhorn
- Rick Margitza – tenor saxophone
- Paulo André Tavares – guitar
- Marc Johnson – bass guitar
- Joey Baron – drums
- Paulo Braga – drums
