= Tijuana Jazz =

Studio album by Gary McFarland and Clark Terry
- Released: 1965
- Recorded: December 3, 6 & 7, 1965
- Genre: Jazz
- Label: Impulse!
- Producer: Bob Thiele

Gary McFarland chronology
The In Sound (1965)	Tijuana Jazz (1965)	Profiles (1966)

Tijuana Jazz is an album by American jazz vibraphonist Gary McFarland and trumpeter Clark Terry featuring performances recorded in 1965 for the Impulse! label. The album was also released in the UK on the His Master's Voice label as CLP3541.

== Reception ==
The AllMusic review by Scott Yanow awarded the album 3 stars stating: "McFarland's arrangements are fine, but the solos are quite short, and the Mexican-flavored music is not particularly memorable. A blown opportunity".

Professional ratings
Review scores
Source	Rating
Allmusic	3/5 stars

== Track listing ==
All compositions by Gary McFarland except as indicated

1. "South of the Border" (Jimmy Kennedy, Michael Carr) - 2:06
2. "Acapulco at Night" - 2:52
3. "Fantastic, That's You" (George Cates, George Douglas) - 2:54
4. "Limehouse Blues" (Philip Braham, Douglas Furber) - 3:37
5. "Tijuana" (Cates, Douglas) - 2:09
6. "Marcheta" (Victor Schertzinger) - 2:55
7. "Granny's Samba" - 3:30
8. "Soul Bird (Tin Tin Deo)" (Gil Fuller, Chano Pozo) - 4:01
9. "Mexicali Rose" (Jack Tenney, Helen Stone) - 2:27
10. "Ira Schwartz's Golden Dream" - 3:32
11. "Mary Jane" - 3:05
12. "Sweet Georgia Brown" (Ben Bernie, Kenneth Casey, Maceo Pinkard) - 2:06

- Recorded in New York City on December 3, 1965 (tracks 1, 2, 6 & 9), December 6, 1965 (tracks 4, 8, 11 & 12), and December 7, 1965 (tracks 3, 5, 7 & 10)

== Personnel ==
- Gary McFarland – marimba, electric piano
- Joe Newman, Clark Terry – trumpet, flugelhorn
- Bob Brookmeyer – valve trombone
- Toots Thielemans – harmonica, guitar
- Barry Galbraith – guitar
- Bob Bushnell – electric bass
- Mel Lewis, Grady Tate – drums
