= The October Suite =

Studio album by Steve Kuhn and Gary McFarland
- Released: January 1967
- Recorded: October 14 and November 1, 1966; New York City
- Genre: Jazz
- Length: 38:42
- Label: Impulse! A-9136
- Producer: Bob Thiele

Gary McFarland chronology
Simpático (1966)	The October Suite (1967)	Soft Samba Strings (1966)

Steve Kuhn chronology
Three Waves (1966)	The October Suite (1966)	Watch What Happens! (1968)

The October Suite is an album by American jazz pianist Steve Kuhn and composer/arranger/conductor Gary McFarland featuring performances recorded in 1966 for the Impulse! label.

== Reception ==
The Allmusic review by Thom Jurek awarded the album 4½ stars stating "it is an anomaly in the Impulse catalog of the time in that it did not pursue the free jazz realms with the vengeance that most of the label's other acts did during that year".

Professional ratings
Review scores
Source	Rating
Allmusic	4.5/5 stars
The Penguin Guide to Jazz Recordings	3/4 stars

== Track listing ==
All compositions by Gary McFarland

1. "Remember When" – 4:52
2. "St. Tropez Shuffle" – 6:22
3. "One I Could Have Loved" – 7:13
4. "Traffic Patterns" – 7:38
5. "Childhood Dreams" – 6:34
6. "Open Highway" – 6:03

Recorded on October 14, 1966 (tracks 1–3) and November 1, 1966 (4–6).

== Personnel ==
- Steve Kuhn – piano
- Gary McFarland – arranger, conductor
- Isadore Cohen, Matthew Raimondi – violin (tracks 1–3)
- Al Brown – viola (tracks 1–3)
- Charles McCracken – cello (tracks 1–3)
- Don Ashworth, Joe Firrantello (aka Joe Farrell), Irving Horowitz, Gerald Sanfino – woodwinds (tracks 4–6)
- Corky Hale – harp (tracks 4–6)
- Ron Carter – bass
- Marty Morell – drums
