= Jazz Raga =

Studio album by Gábor Szabó
- Released: January 1967
- Recorded: August 4 & 17, 1966
- Studio: Van Gelder Studio, Englewood Cliffs, NJ
- Genre: Jazz fusion, raga rock
- Length: 33:58
- Label: Impulse!
- Producer: Bob Thiele

Gábor Szabó chronology
Simpático (1966)	Jazz Raga (1967)	The Sorcerer (1967)

Jazz Raga is an album by Hungarian guitarist Gábor Szabó featuring performances recorded in 1966 for the Impulse! label.

== Reception ==
The Allmusic review by Thom Jurek awarded the album 4 stars stating "The album received mixed reviews at the time but developed a lasting cult following. Jazz Raga is a classic for its barrier-breaking invention and startling creativity".

Professional ratings
Review scores
Source	Rating
Allmusic	4/5 stars

== Track listing ==
All compositions by Gábor Szabó except as noted

1. "Walking on Nails" – 2:48
2. "Mizrab" – 3:32
3. "Search for Nirvana" – 2:08
4. "Krishna" – 3:13
5. "Raga Doll" (Gary McFarland) – 3:44
6. "Comin' Back" – 1:57
7. "Paint It Black" (Mick Jagger, Keith Richards) – 4:42
8. "Sophisticated Wheels" – 3:54
9. "Ravi" – 2:59
10. "Caravan" (Juan Tizol) – 3:01
11. "Summertime" (George Gershwin, DuBose Heyward) – 2:31

- Recorded at Van Gelder Studio in Englewood Cliffs, New Jersey on August 4, 1966 (tracks 4, 6, 8, 10 & 11) and August 17, 1966 (tracks 1–3, 5, 7 & 9)

== Personnel ==
- Gábor Szabó – guitar, sitar, vocals
- Bob Bushnell – guitar (tracks 1–3, 5, 7 & 9)
- Johnny Gregg – bass
- Bernard Purdie – drums
