= Breezin' (song) =

Instrumental composed by Bobby Womack

Single by Gábor Szabó and Bobby Womack

from the album High Contrast
- B-side: "Azure Blue"
- Released: April 1971 (United States); 1972 (Netherlands)
- Recorded: December 1970
- Genre: Crossover jazz; soul jazz
- Length: 3:11 (Album full length); 3:03 (Edit single version)
- Label: Blue Thumb Records
- Songwriter: Bobby Womack
- Producer: Tommy LiPuma

Gábor Szabó singles chronology
"Watch What Happens" (1971)	"Breezin'" (1971)	"It's Going to Take Some Time" (1973)

Bobby Womack singles chronology
"Everybody's Talkin'" (1970)	"Breezin'" (1971)	"The Preacher – Part 2" (1971)

Music video
- "Breezin'" by Gábor Szabó (1971) on YouTube

"Breezin'" is an instrumental song composed by American singer and musician Bobby Womack. It was first recorded in December 1970 by the influential Hungarian jazz guitarist Gábor Szabó, in partnership with Womack himself. This version, produced by Tommy LiPuma, was included on Szabó's album High Contrast (1971) and was released as a single in April 1971 in the United States and 1972 in the Netherlands, reaching No. 43 on the R&B chart. Womack wrote some lyrics for the song that weren't used in Szabo's instrumental version but he does perform the song with lyrics on his DVD Raw, released in 2010.

== Gábor Szabó version (1971) ==
=== Track listing ===
"Breezin'"s full length on Szabó's album High Contrast is 3:11, while the single version is edited to 3:03.

Year	Side	Song	Length	Interpreter	Writer/Composer	Producer	Album
1971	A-side	"Breezin'"	3:03 (Edit single)	Gábor Szabó, Bobby Womack	Bobby Womack	Tommy LiPuma	High Contrast
1971	B-side	"Azure Blue"	4:12	Gábor Szabó, Bobby Womack	Gábor Szabó	Tommy LiPuma	High Contrast

=== Chart position ===
Chart (1971–72)	Peak position
Best Selling Soul Singles (Billboard)	43

=== Personnel ===
- Gábor Szabó – electric guitar, acoustic guitar
- Bobby Womack – songwriter, electric rhythm guitar
- Jim Keltner – drums
- Felix "Flaco" Falcon – congas
- Phil Upchurch – bass guitar
- Rene Hall – string arrangements
- Carmelo Garcia – percussion
- Bruce Botnick – audio engineer
- Tommy LiPuma – tambourine, gourd percussion, record producer

== George Benson version (1976) ==
"Breezin'"

Single by George Benson

from the album Breezin'
- B-side: "Six to Four"
- Released: September 1976
- Recorded: January 1976
- Genre: Jazz; lounge-pop
- Length: 5:40 (Album full length); 5:20 (Edit single version)
- Label: Warner Bros. Records
- Songwriter: Bobby Womack
- Producer: Tommy LiPuma

George Benson singles chronology
"This Masquerade" (1976)	"Breezin'" (1976)	"The World Is a Ghetto" (1977)

Music video
- "Breezin'" by George Benson (1976) on YouTube

Five years after Gábor Szabó's original recording, the song became even better known for a successful rerecording by singer and guitarist George Benson, whose 1976 cover was the title track of his album Breezin'. Benson's version was recorded in January 1976 and released as a single in September of the same year, entering the American charts in October. Like Szabó's original, Benson's cover was produced by Tommy LiPuma. The album and single were released by Warner Bros. Records.

=== Track listing ===
==== 7" single ====
The full length of "Breezin'" on Benson's album Breezin' is 5:40 while the single edit is 5:20.

Year	Side	Song	Length	Interpreter	Writer/Composer	Producer	Album
1976	A-side	"Breezin'"	5:20 (Edit single)	George Benson	Bobby Womack	Tommy LiPuma	Breezin'
1976	B-side	"Six to Four"	5:06	George Benson	Phil Upchurch	Tommy LiPuma	Breezin'

==== 12" single ====
Year	Side	Song	Length	Interpreter	Writer/Composer	Producer	Album
1976	A-side	"Breezin'"	5:40 (Full length)	George Benson	Bobby Womack	Tommy LiPuma	Breezin'
1976	B-side	"This Masquerade"	8:03	George Benson	Leon Russell	Tommy LiPuma	Breezin'

=== Chart history ===
Chart (1976–77)	Peak position
Canada RPM Adult Contemporary	16
US Billboard Hot 100	63
US Billboard Easy Listening	13
US Billboard Hot Soul Singles	55

=== Personnel ===
- Bobby Womack – songwriter
- George Benson – lead guitar, vocals
- Phil Upchurch – bass, rhythm guitar
- Claus Ogerman – conductor, arrangements
- Harvey Mason – drums
- Bennie Maupin – flute
- Ronnie Foster – electric piano, keyboards
- Ralph MacDonald – percussion
- Jorge Dalto – piano, clavinet
- Tommy LiPuma – producer

== Other versions ==
The song was also recorded twice by saxophonist and arranger Hank Crawford: first in 1980 with guitarist Calvin Newborn for their collaborative album Centerpiece and again in 1996 for his album Tight. Additionally, Masayoshi Takanaka recorded a city pop version of the song, released on his 1978 album On Guitar.
