= 1969 (Gábor Szabó album) =

Studio album by Gábor Szabó
- Released: 1969
- Recorded: January 20–24, 1969; United Recording Studio, Los Angeles, California
- Genres: Jazz, crossover jazz
- Length: 34:19
- Labels: Skye; SK 9
- Producer: Gary McFarland

Gábor Szabó chronology
Dreams (1968)	1969 (1969)	Lena & Gabor (1969)

1969 is an album by Hungarian guitarist Gábor Szabó featuring performances recorded in 1969 and released on the Skye label. The album reached number 143 on the U.S. Billboard 200 in September 1969.

== Reception ==
The Allmusic review states: "The Hungarian guitarist doesn't always stretch out as much as he could on this album; at times, he ends a solo that probably should have lasted a few more minutes. But Szabo still deserves credit for bringing a jazz perspective to songs that so many other improvisers were ignoring".

Professional ratings
Review scores
Source	Rating
Allmusic	3/5 stars
DownBeat	3.5/5 stars

== Track listing ==
1. "Dear Prudence" (John Lennon, Paul McCartney) - 2:37
2. "Sealed With a Kiss" (Peter Udell, Gary Geld) - 2:41
3. "Both Sides Now" (Joni Mitchell) - 2:54
4. "Walk Away Renee" (Michael Brown, Bob Calilli, Tony Sansone) - 2:42
5. "You Won't See Me" (Lennon, McCartney) - 3:31
6. "Michael from Mountains" (Joni Mitchell) - 3:56
7. "Stormy" (Buddy Buie, James Cobb) - 3:12
8. "In My Life" (Lennon, McCartney) - 2:25
9. "I've Just Seen a Face" (Lennon, McCartney) - 4:30
10. "Until It's Time for You to Go" (Buffy Sainte-Marie) - 2:18
11. "Somewhere I Belong" (Gábor Szabó) - 3:33

Recorded at United Recording Studio in Los Angeles, California on January 20–24, 1969.

== Personnel ==
- Gábor Szabó - guitar
- Francois Vaz - guitar
- Mike Melvoin - organ
- Louis Kabok - bass
- Randy Cierley-Sterling - electric bass
- Jim Keltner - drums, percussion
- George Ricci - cello
- Gary McFarland - arranger
