= Faces (Gábor Szabó album) =

Studio album by Gábor Szabó
- Released: 1977
- Recorded: March and April 1977
- Studio: ABC Studios, Los Angeles, California
- Genre: Jazz
- Length: 37:55
- Label: Mercury; SRM-1-1141
- Producer: Wayne Henderson

Gábor Szabó chronology
Nightflight (1976)	Faces (1977)	Belsta River (1978)

Faces is an album by Hungarian guitarist Gábor Szabó, released in 1977 on the Mercury label.

== Reception ==
The AllMusic review states: "The iconoclastic guitarist's final American record suffers producer Wayne Henderson's dated disco tendencies. But by the time the needle finds side two, some genuinely beautiful performances emerge".

Professional ratings
Review scores
Source	Rating
AllMusic	3/5 stars
The Rolling Stone Jazz Record Guide	1/5 stars

== Track listing ==
All compositions by Gábor Szabó except as indicated

1. "The Biz" (Bobby Lyle) – 4:35
2. "Magic Mystic Faces" – 5:19
3. "Gloomy Day" (Wayne Henderson, Sylvia St. James) – 5:52
4. "Desiring You" (William Jeffery) – 6:05
5. "Misty Malarky Ying Yang" (Marlon McClain) – 6:59
6. "Alicia" – 5:37
7. "The Last Song" – 6:35
8. "Estaté" (Bruno Martino) – 3:28
  - Recorded at ABC Studios in Los Angeles, California in March and April 1977

== Personnel ==
- Gábor Szabó – guitar
- James O. Stewart – guitar
- Oscar Brashear, Denny Christianson – trumpet
- George Bohannon – trombone
- Ernie Watts – tenor saxophone
- Bobby Lyle – electric piano
- Dean Gant – synthesizer
- Marlon McClain – electric guitar
- Nathaniel Phillips – electric bass
- Bruce Carter – drums
- Rini Kramer – cabassa, percussion
- Vance Tenort, Paul C. Shure, Bonnie Douglas, Assa Drori, Irving Geller, Irma Neumann, Haim Shtrum, Carroll Stephens, Robert Sushel – violin
- James Dunham, Janet Lakatos – viola
- Nathan Gershman, David H. Speltz – cello
- Sylvia St. James, Deborah Shotlow, Suandra Alexander, Cheryl Alexander – vocals
- William Jeffrey – arranger
- Wayne Henderson – horn arrangements
