= Wind, Sky and Diamonds =

Studio album by Gábor Szabó
- Released: February 1968
- Recorded: September 12–14, 1967
- Studios: Western Recorders, Los Angeles, California
- Genres: Jazz, crossover jazz
- Length: 33:45
- Label: Impulse!
- Producer: Bob Thiele

Gábor Szabó chronology
Light My Fire (1967)	Wind, Sky and Diamonds (1968)	Bacchanal (1968)

Wind, Sky and Diamonds is an album by Hungarian jazz guitarist Gábor Szabó featuring performances recorded in 1967 for the Impulse! label.

Professional ratings
Review scores
Source	Rating
Allmusic	2/5 stars
The Rolling Stone Jazz Record Guide	2/5 stars

== Track listing ==
1. "San Franciscan Nights" (Eric Burdon, Vic Briggs, John Weider, Barry Jenkins, Danny McCulloch) – 3:18
2. "A Day in the Life" (John Lennon, Paul McCartney) – 3:20
3. "Twelve Thirty (Young Girls Are Coming to the Canyon)" (John Phillips) – 3:00
4. "To Sir With Love" (Don Black, Mark London) – 2:28
5. "White Rabbit" (Grace Slick) – 2:30
6. "Guantanamera" (Joseíto Fernández) – 3:09
7. "Saigon Bride" (Joan Baez, Nina Duscheck) – 2:10
8. "The End of Life" (John Bahler, Tom Bahler, Gábor Szabó) – 2:55
9. "Lucy in the Sky With Diamonds" (John Lennon, Paul McCartney) – 3:44
10. "Are You There?" (Gábor Szabó, Steve Allen) – 3:31
11. "W.C. Fields" (John Bahler, Tom Bahler) – 3:40

- Recorded by Eddie Brackett at Western Recorders in Los Angeles, California on September 12, 1967 (tracks 3 & 5–7), September 13, 1967 (tracks 4, 9 & 10) and September 14, 1967 (tracks 1, 2, 8 & 11)

== Personnel ==
- Gábor Szabó – guitar, recitation
- Mike Melvoin – piano, harpsichord
- Bill Plummer – sitar
- Dennis Budimir, Herb Ellis, Louis Morell, Howard Roberts – guitar
- Carol Kaye (tracks 1–3,5–8 & 11), Ray Pohlman (tracks 4, 9 & 10) – electric bass
- Jim Gordon, John Guerin – drums
- Victor Feldman, Emil Richards – percussion
- The California Dreamers: Ron Hicklin, Al Capps, Loren Farber, John Bahler, Tom Bahler, Ian Freebairn-Smith, Sally Stevens, Sue Allen, Jackie Ward – vocals
