= More Sorcery =

Live album by Gábor Szabó
- Released: 1967
- Recorded: April 14 & 15 and September 17, 1967
- Genre: Jazz
- Length: 42:15
- Label: Impulse!
- Producer: Bob Thiele

Gábor Szabó chronology
The Sorcerer (1966)	More Sorcery (1967)	Light My Fire (1967)

More Sorcery is a live album by Hungarian jazz guitarist Gábor Szabó featuring performances recorded in 1967 in Boston and at the Monterey Jazz Festival for the Impulse! label.

== Reception ==
The Allmusic reviewer Scott Yanow stated: "In 1967, guitarist Gabor Szabo had his finest working group... This excellent LP is well worth searching for."

Professional ratings
Review scores
Source	Rating
Allmusic	4.5/5 stars

== Track listing ==
All compositions by Gábor Szabó except as indicated

1. "Los Matadoros" - 12:09
2. "People" (Jule Styne, Bob Merrill) - 5:18
3. "Corcovado" (Antônio Carlos Jobim) - 3:22
4. "Lucy in the Sky With Diamonds" (John Lennon, Paul McCartney) - 9:42
5. "Spellbinder" - 6:49
6. "Comin' Back" (Gábor Szabó, Clyde Otis) - 4:55

- Recorded at The Jazz Workshop in Boston, Massachusetts on April 14 & 15, 1967 (tracks 1–3) and at the Monterey Jazz Festival in Monterey, California on September 17, 1967 (tracks 4–6)

== Personnel ==
- Gábor Szabó – guitar
- Jimmy Stewart – guitar
- Lajos "Louis" Kabok – bass
- Bill Goodwin (tracks 4–6), Marty Morell (tracks 1–3) – drums
- Hal Gordon – percussion
