= Grady Tate =

American drummer (1932–2017)

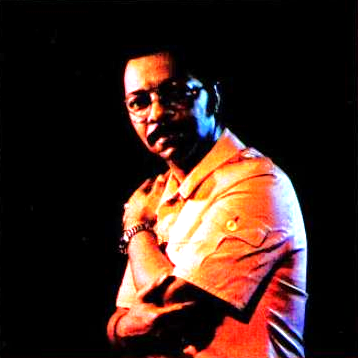
- Tate in 1972

Background information
- Born: January 14, 1932; Durham, North Carolina, U.S.
- Died: October 8, 2017 (aged 85) New York City, U.S.
- Genre: Jazz
- Occupation: Musician
- Instruments: Drums, percussion, vocals
- Years active: 1950s–2017
- Labels: Skye, Impulse!, Milestone

Grady Tate (January 14, 1932 – October 8, 2017) was an American jazz and soul-jazz drummer and baritone vocalist. In addition to his work as sideman, Tate released many albums as leader and lent his voice to songs in the animated Schoolhouse Rock! series. He received two Grammy nominations.

== Biography ==
Tate was born in Hayti, Durham, North Carolina, United States. In 1963 he moved to New York City, where he became the drummer in Quincy Jones's band.

Grady Tate's drumming helped to define a particular hard bop, soul jazz and organ trio sound during the mid-1960s and beyond. His slick, layered and intense sound is recognizable for its understated style in which he integrates his trademark subtle nuances with sharp, crisp "on top of the beat" timing (in comparison to playing slightly before, or slightly after the beat). The Grady Tate sound can be heard prominently on many of the classic Jimmy Smith and Wes Montgomery albums recorded on the Verve label in the 1960s.

During the 1970s, Tate was a member of the New York Jazz Quartet. In 1981, he played drums and percussion for Simon and Garfunkel's Concert in Central Park.

As a sideman, Tate played with musicians including Jimmy Smith, Astrud Gilberto, Ella Fitzgerald, Duke Ellington, Count Basie, Rahsaan Roland Kirk, Quincy Jones, Stan Getz, Cal Tjader, Wes Montgomery, Eddie Harris, J.J. Johnson, Kai Winding and Michel Legrand.

Among his most widely heard vocal performances are the songs "I Got Six", "Naughty Number Nine", and "Fireworks" from Multiplication Rock and America Rock, both part of the Schoolhouse Rock series. For the 1973 motion picture Cops And Robbers, Tate sang the title song, written by Michel Legrand and Jacques Wilson. On Mark Murphy's album Living Room, Tate shares the vocals on a medley of "Misty" and "Midnight Sun". On the album Threesome, with Monty Alexander and Niels-Henning Ørsted Pedersen, Tate sings words to Miles Davis's composition "All Blues", aggregated from a number of well-known and standard blues songs as well as to the jazz standard "Weaver of Dreams" (written by Victor Young).

He joined the faculty of Howard University in 1989.

Grady Tate died of complications of Alzheimer's disease on October 8, 2017, at the age of 85. He was survived by his wife Vivian and son Grady, Jr.

== Discography ==
=== As leader ===
- Windmills of My Mind (Skye, 1968)
- Slaves [O.S.T.] (Skye, 1969)
- Feeling Life (Skye, 1969)
- After the Long Drive Home (Skye, 1970)
- She Is My Lady (Janus, 1972)
- Movin' Day (Janus, 1974)
- By Special Request (Buddah, 1974) compilation
- Master Grady Tate (ABC Impulse, 1977)
- Sings TNT (Milestone, 1991)
- Body & Soul (Milestone, 1993)
- Feeling Free (Pow Wow, 1999)
- All Love (Eighty-Eight's, 2002)
- From the Heart: Songs Sung Live at the Blue Note (Half Note, 2006)

=== As sideman ===
With Ray Bryant

- Up Above the Rock (Cadet, 1968)
- Here's Ray Bryant (Pablo, 1976)
- All Blues (Pablo, 1978)

With Kenny Burrell

- Guitar Forms (Verve, 1965)
- A Generation Ago Today (Verve, 1967)
- Blues – The Common Ground (Verve, 1968)

With Johnny Hodges

- Joe's Blues (Verve, 1965) with Wild Bill Davis
- Blue Notes (Verve, 1966)
- Don't Sleep in the Subway (Verve, 1967)
- 3 Shades of Blue (Flying Dutchman, 1970)

With J. J. Johnson

- J.J.! (RCA Victor, 1964)
- Broadway Express (RCA Victor, 1965)
- The Total J.J. Johnson (RCA Victor, 1966)
- Israel (A&M/CTI, 1968)
- Stonebone (A&M/CTI [Japan], 1969)

With Quincy Jones

- Golden Boy (Mercury, 1964)
- Walking in Space (A&M/CTI, 1969)
- Gula Matari (A&M/CTI, 1970)
- Smackwater Jack (A&M/CTI, 1971)
- The Hot Rock OST (Prophesy, 1972)
- You've Got It Bad Girl (A&M, 1973)

With Oliver Nelson

- More Blues and the Abstract Truth (Impulse!, 1964)
- Encyclopedia of Jazz (Verve, 1966)
- Happenings (Impulse!, 1966)
- Oliver Nelson Plays Michelle (Impulse!, 1966)
- Sound Pieces (Impulse!, 1966)
- The Sound of Feeling (Verve, 1966)
- The Kennedy Dream (Impulse!, 1967)
- The Spirit of '67 (Impulse!, 1967)

With Houston Person

- Broken Windows, Empty Hallways (Prestige, 1972)
- Sweet Buns & Barbeque (Prestige, 1972)
- The Big Horn (Muse, 1976)
- The Nearness of You (Muse, 1977)
- The Talk of the Town (Muse, 1987)
- Just Friends (Muse, 1992) with Buddy Tate, Nat Simpkins
- Christmas with Houston Person and Friends (Muse, 1994)
- Soft Lights (HighNote, 1999)
- Blue Velvet (HighNote, 2001)
- Sentimental Journey (HighNote, 2002)

With Lalo Schifrin

- New Fantasy (Verve, 1964)
- Once a Thief and Other Themes (Verve, 1965)
- Jazz Meets the Symphony (Atlantic, 1992)
- More Jazz Meets the Symphony (Atlantic, 1993)
- Firebird: Jazz Meets the Symphony No. 3 (Four Winds, 1995)

With Zoot Sims

- Zoot Sims and the Gershwin Brothers (Pablo, 1975)
- Soprano Sax (Pablo, 1976)

With Jimmy Smith

- The Cat (Verve, 1964)
- Monster (Verve, 1965)
- Organ Grinder Swing (Verve, 1965)
- Got My Mojo Workin' (Verve, 1966)
- Hoochie Coochie Man (Verve, 1966)
- Go for Whatcha Know (Blue Note, 1986)
- Fourmost (Recorded Live at Fat Tuesday's NYC) (Milestone, 1990)
- Fourmost Return (Milestone, 2001)

With Billy Taylor

- I Wish I Knew How It Would Feel to Be Free (Tower, 1968)
- Sleeping Bee (MPS, 1969)
- Live at Storyville (West 54, 1977)

With Libby Titus

- Libby Titus (Columbia, 1977)

With Cal Tjader

- Soul Sauce (Verve, 1964)
- Soul Bird: Whiffenpoof (Verve, 1965)
- Soul Burst (Verve, 1966)
- Along Comes Cal (Verve, 1967)
- Solar Heat (Skye, 1968)

With Stanley Turrentine

- Joyride (Blue Note, 1965)
- If I Could (MusicMasters Jazz, 1993)

With Kai Winding

- Rainy Day (Verve, 1965)
- More Brass, Dirty Dog (Verve, 1966)
- Penny Lane & Time (Verve, 1967)

With others

- 1962 Charles Mingus, The Complete Town Hall Concert (Blue Note)
- 1963 Gary McFarland, The In Sound (Verve)
- 1964 Ben Webster, See You at the Fair (Impulse!)
- 1964 Budd Johnson, Off the Wall (Argo)
- 1964 Lou Donaldson, Rough House Blues (Argo)
- 1964 Nat Adderley, Autobiography (Atlantic)
- 1965 Dave Pike, Jazz for the Jet Set (Atlantic)
- 1965 Dorothy Ashby, The Fantastic Jazz Harp of Dorothy Ashby (Atlantic)
- 1965 Gary McFarland & Clark Terry, Tijuana Jazz (Impulse!)
- 1965 Illinois Jacquet, Spectrum (Argo)
- 1965 Milt Jackson, Ray Brown / Milt Jackson (Verve)
- 1965 Roland Kirk & Al Hibbler, A Meeting of the Times (Atlantic)
- 1965 Cannonball Adderley, Domination (Capitol)
- 1966 Bill Evans, Bill Evans Trio with Symphony Orchestra (Verve)
- 1966 Clark Terry, Mumbles (Mainstream)
- 1966 Eric Kloss, Love and All That Jazz (Prestige)
- 1966 Gabor Szabo, Gypsy '66 (Impulse!)
- 1966 Jimmy McGriff, The Big Band (Solid State)
- 1966 Shirley Scott, Roll 'Em: Shirley Scott Plays the Big Bands (Impulse!)
- 1967 Herbie Mann, Glory of Love (A&M/CTI)
- 1967 Stan Getz, Sweet Rain (Verve)
- 1967 Jerome Richardson, Groove Merchant (Verve)
- 1967 Jimmy Rushing, Every Day I Have the Blues (BluesWay, 1967)
- 1968 Peggy Lee, 2 Shows Nightly (Capitol)
- 1968 Eddie Lockjaw Davis, Love Calls (RCA Victor)
- 1968 Eddie Harris, Plug Me In (Atlantic)
- 1968 Hubert Laws, Laws' Cause (Atlantic)
- 1968 Jimmy McGriff, The Worm (Solid State)
- 1968 Johnny Hammond Smith, Nasty! (Prestige)
- 1968 Milt Jackson, Milt Jackson and the Hip String Quartet (Verve)
- 1968 Nat Adderley, You, Baby (A&M/CTI),
- 1968 Wes Montgomery, Road Song (A&M/CTI),
- 1968 Roy Ayers, Stoned Soul Picnic (Atlantic)
- 1968 Stan Getz, What the World Needs Now: Stan Getz Plays Burt Bacharach and Hal David (Verve)
- 1969 Freddie Hubbard, A Soul Experiment (Atlantic)
- 1969 Hubert Laws, Crying Song (CTI)
- 1969 Lena Horne & Gabor Szabo, Lena & Gabor (Skye)
- 1969 Aretha Franklin, Soul '69 (Atlantic)
- 1969 Pearls Before Swine, These Things Too (Reprise)
- 1969 Phil Woods, Round Trip (Verve)
- 1969 Ron Carter, Uptown Conversation (Embryo)
- 1969 Peggy Lee, A Natural Woman (Capitol)
- 1971 Dizzy Gillespie, Bobby Hackett & Mary Lou Williams, Giants (Perception),
- 1971 Pearls Before Swine, Beautiful Lies You Could Live In (Reprise)
- 1971 John Simon, John Simon's Album (Warner Bros.)
- 1971 Roberta Flack, Quiet Fire (Atlantic)
- 1972 Eric Kaz, If You're Lonely (Atlantic)
- 1972 Ray Charles, A Message from the People (ABC)
- 1972 Donal Leace, Donal Leace (Atlantic)
- 1972 Grant Green, The Final Comedown (Blue Note)
- 1972 Boogaloo Joe Jones, Snake Rhythm Rock (Prestige)
- 1973 Bette Midler, Bette Midler (Atlantic)
- 1973 Leon Spencer, Where I'm Coming From (Prestige)
- 1973 Donny Hathaway, Extension of a Man (Atco)
- 1973 Lou Donaldson, Sophisticated Lou (Blue Note)
- 1973 Marlena Shaw, From the Depths of My Soul (Blue Note)
- 1973 Paul Simon, There Goes Rhymin' Simon (Columbia)
- 1973 Roberta Flack, Killing Me Softly (Atlantic)
- 1973 Shirley Scott, Superstition (Cadet)
- 1974 Arif Mardin, Journey (Atlantic)
- 1974 Aretha Franklin, With Everything I Feel in Me (Atlantic)
- 1974 Gato Barbieri, Chapter Three: Viva Emiliano Zapata (Impulse!)
- 1974 Jack McDuff, The Fourth Dimension (Cadet)
- 1975 Jack McDuff, Magnetic Feel (Cadet)
- 1975 Hank Jones, Hanky Panky (East Wind)
- 1975 Paul Simon, Still Crazy After All These Years (Columbia)
- 1976 Etta Jones, Ms. Jones to You (Muse)
- 1976 Phoebe Snow, Second Childhood (Columbia)
- 1976 Benny Carter, Wonderland (Pablo)
- 1977 Kate & Anna McGarrigle, Dancer with Bruised Knees (Warner Bros.)
- 1977 Phoebe Snow, Never Letting Go (Columbia)
- 1977 Bruce Roberts, Bruce Roberts (Elektra)
- 1978 Clifford Jordan, The Adventurer (Muse)
- 1978 New York Jazz Quartet, Blues for Sarka (Enja)
- 1978 Kate & Anna McGarrigle, Pronto Monto (Warner Bros.)
- 1979 Charles Earland, Infant Eyes (Muse)
- 1980 Sarah Vaughan, The Duke Ellington Songbook, Vol. 1 (Pablo Today)
- 1980 Sarah Vaughan, The Duke Ellington Songbook, Vol. 2 (Pablo Today)
- 1981 Charles Earland, Pleasant Afternoon (Muse)
- 1981 Carly Simon, Torch (Warner Bros.)
- 1981 Grover Washington Jr. Come Morning (Elektra)
- 1981 Leon Redbone, From Branch to Branch (Atlantic)
- 1982 Red Rodney, The 3R's (Muse)
- 1982 Janis Siegel, Experiment in White (Atlantic)
- 1982 Simon & Garfunkel, The Concert in Central Park (Warner Bros.)
- 1983 Michel Legrand, After the Rain
- 1983 Sadao Watanabe, Fill Up the Night
- 1983 Willis Jackson, Nothing Butt... (Muse)
- 1985 The Manhattan Transfer, Vocalese (Atlantic)
- 1985 Mark Murphy, Living Room (Muse)
- 1988 Peggy Lee, Miss Peggy Lee Sings the Blues (Capitol)
- 1989 Maureen McGovern, Naughty Baby
- 1990 Bette Midler, Some People's Lives (Atlantic)
- 1990 Dizzy Gillespie, The Winter in Lisbon (Milan)
- 1990 Peter Allen, Making Every Moment Count (RCA)
- 1991 Bob Thiele Collective, Louis Satchmo
- 1991 The Manhattan Transfer, The Offbeat of Avenues (Columbia)
- 1992 John Hicks, Friends Old and New (Novus/RCA/BMG)
- 1993 Andre Previn, What Headphones? (Angel)
- 1993 Frank Morgan, Listen to the Dawn (Antilles, [1994])
- 1993 Peggy Lee, Love Held Lightly: Rare Songs by Harold Arlen
- 1994 Oscar Peterson & Itzhak Perlman, Side by Side (Telarc)
- 1995 Andre Previn, Andre Previn and Friends Play "Show Boat" (Deutsche Grammophon)
- 2000 Benny Bailey, The Satchmo Legacy (Enja, 2000)
- 2003 Aaron Neville, Nature Boy (The Standards Album) (Verve Records)
- 2003 Mark Murphy, Memories of You: Remembering Joe Williams (HighNote)
- 2007 Kenny Barron, The Traveler (Sunnyside)
