= Wendy and Bonnie =

American sibling musical duo

Wendy and Bonnie Flower were an American musical duo of singing sisters, who recorded the album Genesis in 1969 for Skye Records.

== Genesis ==
The sisters grew up in Millbrae, California, in the San Francisco Bay suburbs. Their parents, Art and Jeane Flower, were professional musicians. In 1967, aged 16, Wendy played and recorded with an early San Francisco psychedelic band called Crystal Fountain; Bonnie later joined the band as drummer. The following year, Latin percussionist Cal Tjader (Wendy and Bonnie's godfather) heard some of the Flower sisters' acoustic home demos and arranged a recording session with Skye Records in Los Angeles, which became the album Genesis (1969). The sisters, who were 17 and 13 respectively when the album was recorded, composed all the songs. The album was produced and arranged by jazz polymath Gary McFarland, who was a partner in the ownership of Skye, along with Tjader, music impresario Norman Schwartz, and guitarist Gábor Szabó. With his arrangements, McFarland crafted a post-psychedelic soft rock sound with Brazilian overtones. Musicians who performed on the album included guitarist Larry Carlton, drummer Jim Keltner, and keyboardist Mike Melvoin.

The Skye label went bankrupt shortly after the album's release. In 1971, while planning additional recording with the Flower sisters, McFarland died of methadone poisoning in mysterious circumstances in a New York bar.

== Legacy and later activities ==
In the early 1970s, Wendy and Bonnie provided background vocals on two Cal Tjader albums for Fantasy Records. Thereafter, the sisters pursued separate careers in music and entertainment, but did not record together again. Wendy Flower eventually completed a degree in childhood education and became a music teacher.

Genesis was reissued on CD in 2001 by the Sundazed Music label. In 2008, it was reissued in expanded format, including demos, alternate mixes, and vintage live recordings, on 2-CD and 3-LP vinyl sets.

Their recording "By the Sea" was sampled by the Welsh space rock band Super Furry Animals for their single "Hello Sunshine", the opening track on the 2003 album Phantom Power. In 2010, French singer Laetitia Sadier of UK group Stereolab recorded "By the Sea" for her album The Trip.

Wendy Flower sang guest harmony with Super Furry Animals at The Fillmore in San Francisco, Tonic in New York, and London's Institute of Contemporary Arts, followed by an appearance at the 2007 Meltdown Festival, curated by Jarvis Cocker, as one of the "Lost Ladies of Folk", backed by Jane Weaver and The High Llamas. She sang on Weaver's Fallen By Watchbird album, and released a solo indie-pop album, New, in 2013.

Bonnie Flower died at the age of 63 on November 15, 2017.
