= The Sorcerer (album) =

Live album by Gábor Szabó
- Released: November 1967
- Recorded: April 14 & 15, 1967
- Genre: Jazz
- Length: 38:30
- Label: Impulse!
- Producer: Bob Thiele

Gábor Szabó chronology
Jazz Raga (1966)	The Sorcerer (1967)	More Sorcery (1967)

The Sorcerer is a live album by Hungarian jazz guitarist Gábor Szabó featuring performances recorded in 1967 for the Impulse! label.

== Reception ==
The Allmusic review by Douglas Payne awarded the album 4½ stars stating "The playing seems inspired, and the interplay within the group is something to behold -- even when performing lightweight tunes".

Professional ratings
Review scores
Source	Rating
Allmusic	4.5/5 stars
DownBeat	4/5 stars
Reverb Central	link

== Track listing ==
All compositions by Gábor Szabó except as indicated

1. "The Beat Goes On" (Sonny Bono) - 4:52
2. "Little Boat (O Barquinho)" (Ronaldo Bôscoli, Roberto Menescal) - 4:23
3. "Lou-Ise" (Jimmy Stewart) - 4:17
4. "What Is This Thing Called Love?" (Cole Porter) - 5:18
5. "Space" - 6:40
6. "Stronger Than Us (Plus fort que nous) (from A Man and a Woman)" (Francis Lai, Pierre Barouh) - 4:13
7. "Mizrab" - 6:58
8. "Comin' Back" (Clyde Otis, Gábor Szabó) 1:56
9. "Los Matadoros" - 12:09 (Bonus track on CD reissue)
10. "People" (Jule Styne, Bob Merrill) - 5:18 (Bonus track on CD reissue)
11. "Corcovado" (Antônio Carlos Jobim) - 3:22 (Bonus track on CD reissue)

- Recorded at The Jazz Workshop in Boston, Massachusetts on April 14 & 15, 1967

== Personnel ==
- Gábor Szabó - guitar
- Jimmy Stewart - guitar
- Lajos "Louis" Kabok - bass
- Marty Morell – drums
- Hal Gordon - percussion
