= Simpático (Gary McFarland and Gábor Szabó album) =

Studio album by Gary McFarland and Gábor Szabó
- Released: 1966
- Recorded: May 18 & 20, 1966
- Studio: Van Gelder Studio, Englewood Cliffs, NJ
- Genre: Jazz
- Length: 30:37
- Label: Impulse!
- Producer: Bob Thiele

Gary McFarland chronology
Profiles (1966)	Simpático (1966)	The October Suite (1966)

Gábor Szabó chronology
Spellbinder (1966)	Simpático (1966)	Jazz Raga (1966)

Simpático is an album by American jazz vibraphonist Gary McFarland and Hungarian guitarist Gábor Szabó featuring performances recorded in 1966 for the Impulse! label.

== Reception ==
The Allmusic review by Douglas Payne awarded the album 2 stars stating "Simpatico features its principals' lackluster singing and silly lyrics, but there are occasional hints of their abilities".

Professional ratings
Review scores
Source	Rating
Allmusic	2/5 stars

== Track listing ==
1. "The Word" (John Lennon, Paul McCartney) – 2:15
2. "Nature Boy" (Eden Ahbez) – 2:48
3. "Norwegian Wood (This Bird Has Flown)" (Lennon, McCartney) – 2:35
4. "Hey, Here's a Heart" (Gary McFarland, Cliff Owen) – 2:39
5. "Cool Water" (Bob Nolan) – 2:36
6. "Ups and Downs" (Gary McFarland) – 2:59
7. "Yamaha Mama" (Gábor Szabó) – 2:16
8. "You Will Pay" (Szabó) – 2:48
9. "Spring Song" (Szabó) – 2:20
10. "She's a Cruiser" (McFarland) – 2:36
11. "Simpático" (McFarland) – 4:45

- Recorded at Van Gelder Studio in Englewood Cliffs, New Jersey on May 18, 1966 (tracks 3, 5, 8 & 10), and May 20, 1966 (tracks 1, 2, 4, 6, 7–9 & 11)

== Personnel ==
- Gary McFarland – vibes, whistling, vocals
- Gábor Szabó – guitar, vocals
- Sam Brown – guitar
- Bob Bushnell (tracks 4 & 7) Richard Davis (tracks 1–3, 5, 6 & 8–11) – bass
- Joe Cocuzzo – drums
- Tommy Lopez, Barry Rodgers – percussion
