= Waiting Game (album) =

Studio album by Zoot Sims
- Released: 1966
- Recorded: November 28 & 30, 1966
- Genre: Jazz
- Length: 43:05
- Label: Impulse!
- Producer: Bob Thiele, Gary McFarland

Zoot Sims chronology
New Beat Bossa Nova Vol. 2 (1962)	Waiting Game (1966)	Easy as Pie: Live at the West Bank (1968)

Waiting Game is an album by American jazz saxophonist Zoot Sims and Orchestra arranged by Gary McFarland featuring performances recorded in England in 1966 for the Impulse! label.

== Track listing ==
All compositions by Gary McFarland except as indicated

1. "Old Folks" (Dedette Lee Hill, Willard Robison) – 4:52
2. "I Wish I Knew" (Mack Gordon) – 4:11
3. "Once We Loved" – 2:46
4. "It's a Blue World" (George Forrest, Robert Wright) – 3:47
5. "September Song" (Kurt Weill, Maxwell Anderson) – 4:48
6. "Over the Rainbow" (Harold Arlen, Yip Harburg) – 5:02
7. "Stella by Starlight" (Victor Young, Ned Washington) – 4:36
8. "One I Could Have Loved" – 3:13
9. "You Go to My Head" (J. Fred Coots, Haven Gillespie) – 4:04
10. "Does the Sun Really Shine on the Moon?" – 5:46

- Recorded in London, England on November 28, 1966 (tracks 1–5 & 8–10), and November 30, 1966 (6 & 7)

== Personnel ==
- Zoot Sims – tenor saxophone, vocals
- David Snell – harp
- Gary McFarland – arranger
- Kenny Napper, (tracks 6 & 7), Jack Parnell (tracks 1–5 & 8–10) – conductor
- Unknown Orchestra

Technical

- Robert Flynn – cover design
- Arthur Halpern – cover photography
- Nat Hentoff – liner notes
