= Watch What Happens! =

Studio album by Steve Kuhn
- Released: 1968
- Recorded: July 4, 1968
- Studio: MPS Tonstudio, Villingen, West Germany
- Genre: Jazz
- Label: MPS; 15 193 ST
- Producer: Joachim-Ernst Berendt

Steve Kuhn chronology
The October Suite (1966)	Watch What Happens! (1968)	Childhood Is Forever (1969)

not to be confused with Watch What Happens Live with Andy Cohen

Watch What Happens! is an album by American jazz pianist and composer Steve Kuhn recorded in 1968 and originally released on the MPS label but rereleased in the US as In Europe; 1968 on the Prestige label in 1969.

== Reception ==
The Allmusic review by Ken Dryden awarded the album 4 stars, stating: "Like many pianists, Steve Kuhn seems to put out one quality disc after another but doesn't ever seem to get the attention he deserves. This beautifully recorded studio date from 1968, with bassist Palle Danielsson and drummer Jon Christensen, is a good example".

Professional ratings
Review scores
Source	Rating
Allmusic	4/5 stars

== Track listing ==
All compositions by Steve Kuhn except as indicated

1. "Watch What Happens" (Michel Legrand) - 2:49
2. "Silver" - 2:16
3. "Lament/Once We Loved" (J. J. Johnson/Gary McFarland) - 6:55
4. "Tom Jones" (John Addison, Mack Davis) - 6:42
5. "Windows of the World/Here I Am" (Burt Bacharach, Hal David) - 4:17
6. "I Fall in Love Too Easily" (Jule Styne, Sammy Cahn) - 4:04
7. "Ad Infinitum" (Carla Bley) - 9:14

== Personnel ==
- Steve Kuhn - piano
- Palle Danielsson - bass
- Jon Christensen - drums
