= Profiles (Gary McFarland album) =

Live album by Gary McFarland
- Released: 1966
- Recorded: February 6, 1966
- Genre: Jazz
- Length: 40:54
- Label: Impulse!
- Producer: Bob Thiele

Gary McFarland chronology
Tijuana Jazz (1965)	Profiles (1966)	Simpático (1966)

Profiles is a live album by American jazz vibraphonist Gary McFarland featuring performances recorded at the Lincoln Centre Philharmonic Hall in 1966 for the Impulse! label.

== Reception ==
The Allmusic review by Douglas Payne awarded the album 4½ stars calling it "An excellent collection of McFarland originals performed at Lincoln Center by a stellar orchestra of jazz luminaries".

Professional ratings
Review scores
Source	Rating
Allmusic	4.5/5 stars

== Track listing ==
All compositions by Gary McFarland

1. "Winter Colors" - 8:55
2. "Willie" - 3:18
3. "Sage Hands" - 6:41
4. "Bygones and Boogie (Boogie & Out)" - 12:00
5. "Mountain Heir" - 4:15
6. "Milo's Other Samba" - 5:45

- Recorded at the Lincoln Center Philharmonic Hall in New York City on February 6, 1966

== Personnel ==
- Gary McFarland – vibraphone, marimba, arranger, conductor
- Bill Berry, John Frosk, Bernie Glow, Joe Newman, Clark Terry – trumpet, flugelhorn
- Bob Brookmeyer, Jimmy Cleveland – trombone
- Bob Northern – french horn
- Jay McAllister – tuba
- Phil Woods – alto saxophone, clarinet
- Jerry Dodgion – alto saxophone, clarinet, flute
- Zoot Sims – tenor saxophone, clarinet
- Richie Kamuca – tenor saxophone, baritone saxophone, bass clarinet, english horn
- Jerome Richardson – baritone saxophone, alto saxophone, clarinet, bass clarinet, flute, piccolo
- Sam Brown, Gábor Szabó – guitar
- Richard Davis – bass
- Joe Cocuzzo – drums
- Tommy Lopez – percussion
