= Spellbinder (album) =

Studio album by Gábor Szabó
- Released: October 1966
- Recorded: May 6, 1966
- Studio: Van Gelder Studio, Englewood Cliffs, New Jersey
- Genre: Jazz
- Length: 36:59
- Label: Impulse!
- Producer: Bob Thiele

Gábor Szabó chronology
Gypsy '66 (1966)	Spellbinder (1966)	Simpático (1966)

Spellbinder is an album by Hungarian guitarist Gábor Szabó featuring performances recorded in 1966 for the Impulse! label. The album contains "Gypsy Queen" which was covered as a medley with Fleetwood Mac's "Black Magic Woman" by Santana on their 1970 Abraxas album. This album reached No. 140 on 1967/01/28 on Billboard 200.

== Reception ==
The Allmusic review by Thom Jurek awarded the album 4½ stars stating "Szabo's read on jazz in the '60s was brilliant. He embodied all of its most popular aspirations with a genuine spirit of innovation and adventure. Spellbinder is a masterpiece".

Professional ratings
Review scores
Source	Rating
Allmusic	4.5/5 stars
DownBeat	4/5 stars

== Track listing ==
All compositions by Gábor Szabó except as indicated

1. "Spellbinder" – 5:30
2. "Witchcraft" (Cy Coleman, Carolyn Leigh) – 4:39
3. "It Was a Very Good Year" (Ervin Drake) – 2:47
4. "Gypsy Queen" – 5:13
5. "Bang Bang (My Baby Shot Me Down)" (Sonny Bono) – 2:28
6. "Cheetah" – 4:10
7. "My Foolish Heart" (Ned Washington, Victor Young) – 5:28
8. "Yearning" – 2:59
9. "Autumn Leaves/Speak to Me of Love" (Joseph Kosma, Jacques Prévert, Johnny Mercer/Jean Lenoir) – 3:35

== Personnel ==
- Gábor Szabó – guitar, vocals
- Ron Carter – bass
- Chico Hamilton – drums
- Willie Bobo, Victor Pantoja – percussion

== Charts ==
Album – Billboard

Year	Chart	Position
1967/03/18	Billboard Best Selling Jazz LP's	2
