= Point of Departure (Gary McFarland album) =

Studio album by Gary McFarland
- Released: 1963
- Recorded: September 5 & 6, 1963
- Studio: RCA Studios
- Genre: Jazz
- Length: 39:47
- Label: Impulse!
- Producer: Bob Thiele

Gary McFarland chronology
The Gary McFarland Orchestra (1963)	Point of Departure (1963)	Soft Samba (1964)

Point of Departure is an album by American jazz vibraphonist Gary McFarland featuring performances recorded in 1963 for the Impulse! label.

== Reception ==
The Allmusic review by Scott Yanow awarded the album 4½ stars stating: "The music is bop-oriented, but also open to occasional innovations taken from the avant-garde. None of the songs caught on as standards, but they tend to stay in one's mind after finishing the album".

Professional ratings
Review scores
Source	Rating
Allmusic	4.5/5 stars

== Track listing ==
All compositions by Gary McFarland except as indicated

1. "Pecos Pete" – 5:19
2. "Love Theme From David and Lisa" (Mark Lawrence) – 2:34
3. "Sandpiper" – 7:44
4. "Amour Tormentoso" – 3:26
5. "Schlock-House Blues" – 6:17
6. "I Love to Say Her Name" – 5:05
7. "Hello to the Season" – 6:54

- Recorded at RCA Studios in New York City by Bob Simpson on September 5, 1963 (tracks 4 & 5) and September 6, 1963 (tracks 1–3, 6 & 7)

== Personnel ==
- Gary McFarland – vibes
- Willie Dennis – trombone
- Richie Kamuca – tenor saxophone, oboe
- Jimmy Raney – guitar
- Steve Swallow – bass
- Mel Lewis – drums
