= Dreams (Gábor Szabó album) =

Studio album by Gábor Szabó
- Released: November 1968
- Recorded: 6, 7, 9, 22 August 1968
- Studios: United Recording Studio, Los Angeles, California
- Genres: Crossover jazz, third stream
- Length: 34:48
- Labels: Skye; SK 7
- Producer: Gary McFarland

Gábor Szabó chronology
Bacchanal (1968)	Dreams (1968)	1969 (1969)

Dreams is an album by Hungarian guitarist Gábor Szabó featuring performances recorded in 1968 and released on the Skye label. The design was made by David Stahlberg, and features artwork by English illustrator John Austen entitled "Vision".

== Reception ==
The Allmusic review states: "a collection of originals, pop covers, and classical reinterpretations. The result is a sort of accessible third-stream music. Szabo has many fine moments".

Professional ratings
Review scores
Source	Rating
Allmusic	3/5 stars
DownBeat	4/5 stars

== Track listing ==
All compositions by Gábor Szabó, except as indicated.

1. "Galatea's Guitar" – 5:33
2. "Half the Day is the Night" (Gary McFarland) – 4:23
3. "Song of Injured Love" (Manuel de Falla) – 4:05
4. "The Fortune Teller" (Gábor Szabó, Louis Kabok) – 4:28
5. "Fire Dance" (Falla) – 5:39
6. "The Lady in the Moon" – 5:13
7. "Ferris Wheel" (Donovan Leitch) – 5:27

Recorded in Los Angeles, California on 6, 7, 9 August 1968 with overdubs recorded in New York City on 22 August 1968.

== Personnel ==
- Gábor Szabó – guitar
- Jim Stewart – guitar
- Louis Kabok – bass
- Jim Keltner – drums
- Hal Gordon – percussion
- Tony Miranda, Ray Alonge, Brooks Tillotson – French horn
- Julius Schacter – violin
- George Ricci – cello
- Gary McFarland – piano, arranger
