= Breezin' =

Studio album by George Benson
- Released: March 19, 1976
- Recorded: January 6–8, 1976
- Studio: Capitol (Hollywood)
- Genre: Smooth jazz
- Length: 38:42
- Label: Warner Bros.
- Producer: Tommy LiPuma

George Benson chronology
| Benson & Farrell (1976) | Breezin' (1976) | In Flight (1977) |

Singles from Breezin'
- 1. "This Masquerade" Released: 1977; 2. "Breezin'" Released: 1977

Breezin' is the fifteenth studio album by jazz/soul guitarist and vocalist George Benson. It is his debut on Warner Bros. Records. It not only was a Billboard Jazz Albums chart-topper but also went to number 1 on the Pop and R&B charts. It was certified triple platinum, making it one of the best-selling jazz albums of all time.

== Commercial performance ==
Breezin' marked the beginning of Benson's most successful period commercially, topping the Billboard Pop, Jazz and R&B album charts. It spun off two hit singles, the title song (which has become a fusion jazz standard) and "This Masquerade", which was a top ten pop and R&B hit. The album has since been certified as 3× Multi-Platinum by the RIAA.

The album garnered multiple nominations and awards at the 19th Annual Grammy Awards. The album won the awards Best Pop Instrumental Performance for Benson and Best Engineered Album, Non-Classical for Al Schmitt and was nominated as Album of the Year for Tommy LiPuma and Benson. "This Masquerade" received the award Record of the Year for LiPuma and Benson, while it was nominated as Song of the Year for Leon Russell and as Best Pop Vocal Performance, Male for Benson.

== Critical reception ==
Professional ratings
Review scores
| Source | Rating |
|---|---|
| AllMusic | 3.5/5 stars |
| Christgau's Record Guide | C |
| The Penguin Guide to Jazz Recordings | 3/5 stars |

In a contemporaneous review for The Village Voice, music critic Robert Christgau gave the album a "C" and dismissed most of its music as "mush". In a retrospective review, Allmusic's Richard S. Ginell gave it three-and-a-half out of five stars and said that, although Benson's guitar is "as assured and fluid as ever", Breezin' is "really not so much a breakthrough as it is a transition album; the guitar is still the core of his identity". A more recent review (2023), on the Best of Jazz website, was more generous. It stated "Breezin’ is one of the best albums for Benson. This 70’s masterpiece gave [him] true popularity."

== Track listing ==
Side one
| No. | Title | Writer(s) | Length |
|---|---|---|---|
| 1. | "Breezin'" | Bobby Womack | 5:40 |
| 2. | "This Masquerade" | Leon Russell | 8:03 |
| 3. | "Six to Four" | Phil Upchurch | 5:06 |

Side two
| No. | Title | Writer(s) | Length |
|---|---|---|---|
| 1. | "Affirmation" | José Feliciano | 7:01 |
| 2. | "So This Is Love?" | George Benson | 7:03 |
| 3. | "Lady" | Ronnie Foster | 5:49 |

== Personnel ==
- George Benson – guitar, vocals
- Jorge Dalto – acoustic piano, clavinet, acoustic piano solo (2)
- Ronnie Foster – electric piano, Minimoog, Minimoog solo (3), electric piano solo (5)
- Phil Upchurch – rhythm guitar, bass guitar (1, 3)
- Stanley Banks – bass guitar (2, 4–6)
- Harvey Mason – drums
- Ralph MacDonald – percussion
- Bennie Maupin – flute
- Claus Ogerman – arrangements and conductor

== Production ==
- Tommy LiPuma – producer
- Noel Newbolt – associate producer
- Al Schmitt – recording, mixing
- Don Henderson – assistant engineer
- Doug Sax – mastering at the Mastering Lab (Hollywood, California).
- Ed Thrasher – art direction
- Robert Lockhart – art direction
- Peter Palombi – design
- Mario Casilli – photography

== Charts ==
=== Weekly charts ===
| Chart (1976–78) | Peak position |
|---|---|
| Australian Albums (ARIA) | 200 |
| Canada Top Albums/CDs (RPM) | 9 |
| New Zealand Albums (RMNZ) | 9 |
| US Billboard 200 | 1 |
| US Top R&B/Hip-Hop Albums (Billboard) | 1 |

| Chart (2021) | Peak position |
|---|---|
| US Top Jazz Albums (Billboard) | 12 |

=== Year-end charts ===
| Chart (1976) | Position |
|---|---|
| Canada Top Albums/CDs (RPM) | 69 |
| US Billboard 200 | 19 |
| US Top R&B/Hip-Hop Albums (Billboard) | 4 |

| Chart (1977) | Position |
|---|---|
| New Zealand Albums (RMNZ) | 33 |
| US Billboard 200 | 26 |

| Chart (1978) | Position |
|---|---|
| New Zealand Albums (RMNZ) | 35 |

== Certifications and sales ==
| Region | Certification | Certified units/sales |
|---|---|---|
| Australia (ARIA) | 2× Platinum | 140,000^{^} |
| Japan | — | 43,090 |
| United Kingdom (BPI) | Silver | 60,000^{^} |
| United States (RIAA) | 3× Platinum | 3,000,000^{^} |
^{^} Shipments figures based on certification alone.

== See also ==
- List of Billboard 200 number-one albums of 1976
- List of Billboard number-one R&B albums of 1976
