= Small World (Gábor Szabó album) =

Studio album by Gábor Szabó
- Released: 1972
- Recorded: August 12 & 13, 1972; Stockholm, Sweden
- Genre: Jazz
- Length: 45:10
- Labels: Four Leaf Clover; EFG-7230
- Producer: Lars Samuelson

Gábor Szabó chronology
Gabor Szabo Live (1972)	Small World (1972)	Mizrab (1972)

Small World is an album by Hungarian guitarist Gábor Szabó featuring performances recorded in Stockholm in 1972 and released on the Swedish Four Leaf Clover label.

== Reception ==
The Allmusic review states "Small World is one of the most unsung albums by Hungarian guitarist and composer Gabor Szabo. While it's true that the 1970s were not recognized as a great time for the artist, Small World is the exception rather than the rule... This is a stunner. Period".

Professional ratings
Review scores
Source	Rating
Allmusic	4.5/5 stars

== Track listing ==
All compositions by Gábor Szabó except as indicated

1. "People/My Kind of People" (Jule Styne, Bob Merrill/Gábor Szabó) - 8:48
2. "Lilac-Glen" (Alicia Solari, Gábor Szabó, Peter Totth) - 5:36
3. "Mizrab" - 9:09
4. "Impression of My Country/Foothill Patrol" - 12:04
5. "Another Dream" (Totth) - 4:59
6. "Concierto de Aranjuez" (Joaquín Rodrigo) - 4:34

- Recorded in Stockholm, Sweden on August 12 & 13, 1972

== Personnel ==
- Gábor Szabó - guitar
- Janne Schaffer - guitar (tracks 3, 4 & 5)
- Berndt Egerbladh - electric piano (tracks 3, 4 & 5)
- Sture Nordin - bass (tracks 1 & 2)
- Stefan Brolund - electric bass (tracks 3, 4 & 5)
- Nils-Erik Slorner - drums (tracks 1–5)
