= Firebird: Jazz Meets the Symphony No. 3 =

Studio album by Lalo Schifrin
- Released: 1995
- Recorded: January 1995
- Studio: CTS Studios London
- Genre: Jazz
- Length: 54:28
- Labels: Four Winds; FW2004
- Producer: Lalo Schifrin

Lalo Schifrin chronology
More Jazz Meets the Symphony (1993)	Firebird: Jazz Meets the Symphony No. 3 (1995)	Gillespiana (1995)

Firebird: Jazz Meets the Symphony No. 3 is an album by composer, pianist and conductor Lalo Schifrin with bassist Ray Brown, drummer Grady Tate, trumpeters Jon Faddis and James Morrison, saxophonist Paquito D'Rivera and the London Philharmonic Orchestra recorded in 1995 and released on the Four Winds label.

== Reception ==
The Allmusic review stated "The third in Lalo Schifrin's series of grand fusions between the London Philharmonic and an all-star jazz combo is the most successful one yet. The immovable objects of symphony orchestra and jazz group are getting more closely in sync, thanks to the irresistible forces of Schifrin's long experience in both camps and his own luscious personal orchestral signatures... The whole thing is gorgeously and spaciously recorded; this should be a demonstration disc for hi-fi shows".

Professional ratings
Review scores
Source	Rating
Allmusic	4.5/5 stars

== Track listing ==
All compositions by Lalo Schifrin except as indicated

1. "Birdland" (Joe Zawinul) - 5:53
2. "Vignettes of Fats Waller (Medley):"
  - "Willow Tree" (Fats Waller, Andy Razaf) - 2:20
  - "Jitterbug Waltz" (Waller) - 1:18
  - "Lounging at the Waldorf" (Waller) - 0:28
  - "I've Got the Feeling I'm Falling" (Waller) - 0:53
  - "Lounging at the Waldorf" (Waller) - 0:10
  - "Ain't Misbehavin'" (Waller, Harry Brooks, Razaf) - 1:35
  - "Groovin' High" (Dizzy Gillespie) - 0:22
  - "Honeysuckle Rose" (Waller, Razaf) - 0:57
  - "Scrapple from the Apple" (Charlie Parker) - 0:09
3. "Around the Day in Eighty Worlds" - 5:47
4. "Mission: Impossible/Take Five" (Schifrin/Paul Desmond) - 3:27
5. "Eine Kleine Jazz Musik (A Little Jazz Music)" - 3:20
6. "An American in Paris/Parisian Thoroughfare" (George Gershwin/Bud Powell) - 3:57
7. "It's You or No One" (Sammy Cahn, Jule Styne) - 4:42
8. "El Dorado" - 6:54
9. "Charlie Parker: The Firebird (Medley):"
  - "Firebird Suite" (Igor Stravinsky) - 0:08
  - "Parker's Mood" (Parker) - 0:19
  - "Fallen Feathers" (Quincy Jones) - 0:22
  - "Firebird Suite" (Stravinsky) - 0:15
  - "April in Paris" (Vernon Duke, E. Y. Harburg) - 1:09
  - "How High the Moon" (Nancy Hamilton, Morgan Lewis) - 0:14
  - "Firebird Suite" (Stravinsky) - 0:04
  - "Just Friends" (Sam M. Lewis, John Klenner) - 1:08
  - "I'll Remember April" (Gene de Paul, Patricia Johnston, Don Raye) - 1:41
  - "Firebird Suite" (Stravinsky) - 0:13
  - "Repetition" (Neil Hefti) - 1:27
  - "Firebird Suite" (Stravinsky) - 0:30
  - "Donna Lee" (Miles Davis) - 0:23
  - "Firebird Suite" (Stravinsky) - 0:09
  - "Cherokee" (Ray Noble) - 0:50
  - "Firebird Suite" (Stravinsky) - 0:11
  - "Lover Man (Oh, Where Can You Be?)" (Roger Ramirez, Jimmy Davis, Jimmy Sherman) - 2:13
  - "Parker's Mood" (Parker) - 0:24
  - "Now's the Time" (Parker) - 0:36

== Personnel ==
- Lalo Schifrin - piano, arranger, conductor
- Jon Faddis - trumpet
- Paquito D'Rivera - tenor saxophone, clarinet
- James Morrison - flugelhorn, trombone, trumpet
- Ray Brown - bass
- Grady Tate - drums
- London Philharmonic Orchestra
