= Bob Thiele Collective =

Jazz ensemble

The Bob Thiele Collective was an "all-star" American jazz ensemble which recorded three albums for Bob Thiele's record label Red Baron Records.Thiele assembled and produced the three different groups. Their first album Sunrise, Sunset was released on December 28, 1990. In the following year they released Louis Satchmo (December 11, 1991). Two years later, the groups final album, The Lion Hearted, was released.

== Discography ==
- 1990: Sunrise Sunset (David Murray, John Hicks, Cecil McBee, Andrew Cyrille)
- 1991: Louis Satchmo (Joshua Redman, Red Rodney, Kenny Barron, Santi Debriano, Grady Tate)
- 1993: Lion Hearted (Gary Bartz, Ravi Coltrane, Steve Marcus, Ray Anderson, Ray Drummond, Roy Hargrove, Kenny Barron, Grady Tate)
