= High Contrast (album) =

Studio album by Gábor Szabó
- Released: 1971
- Recorded: December 1970; February 1971
- Studio: Capitol (Hollywood); Record Plant (Hollywood)
- Genre: Crossover jazz, soul jazz
- Length: 40:13
- Label: Blue Thumb Records
- Producer: Tommy LiPuma

Gábor Szabó chronology
Magical Connection (1970)	High Contrast (1971)	Gabor Szabo Live (1972)

High Contrast is an album by Hungarian jazz guitarist Gábor Szabó, produced by Tommy LiPuma and recorded by Bruce Botnick at Capitol Studios, Hollywood in December 1970 (tracks 1,4,7) & at The Record Plant, Hollywood in February 1971 (tracks 2,3,6). The album features a major contribution from songwriter and guitarist Bobby Womack, including the original version of Womack's "Breezin'", that George Benson would have a major hit with in 1976 (also produced by LiPuma). The composition "If You Don't Want My Love" was also used by Womack in his soundtrack to the film Across 110th Street.

Professional ratings
Review scores
Source	Rating
Allmusic	4/5 stars
The Encyclopedia of Popular Music	3/5 stars

== Track listing ==
All tracks composed by Bobby Womack; except where indicated

1. "Breezin'" - 3:11
2. "Amazon" - (Gábor Szabó) 4:57
3. "Fingers" - (Gábor Szabó, Wolfgang Melz) 7:34
4. "Azure Blue" - (Gábor Szabó) 4:15
5. "Just a Little Communication" - 7:51
6. "If You Don't Want My Love" - 4:37
7. "I Remember When" - 7:35

== Personnel ==
- Gábor Szabó - Electric guitar, Acoustic guitar
- Bobby Womack - Electric rhythm guitar
- Jim Keltner - Drums
- Felix "Flaco" Falcon - Congas
- The Shadow (a.k.a.Tommy LiPuma) - Tambourine, Gourd percussion, Record producer
- Wolfgang Melz - Bass (2 - 6)
- Phil Upchurch - Bass (1, 7)
- Mark Levine - Piano (3)
- Carmelo Garcia - Tom-tom (2), Timbales (3)
- Rene Hall - String arrangements
- Bruce Botnick - Audio engineer

== Charts ==
=== Singles ===
Year	Single	Chart positions
Year	Single	US R&B
1971	"Breezin'"	43
