= This Masquerade =

Single by George Benson

from the album Breezin'
- A-side: "The World is a Ghetto" (Netherlands)
- B-side: "Lady" "Six to Four" (UK) "Breezin'" (Japan)
- Released: April 1976
- Recorded: January 1976
- Studio: Capitol (Hollywood)
- Genre: Soul
- Length: 8:03 (Album full length); 3:17 (Single edit version)
- Label: Warner Bros. Records
- Songwriter: Leon Russell
- Producer: Tommy LiPuma

George Benson singles chronology
"Summertime" / "2001" (1976)	"This Masquerade" (1976)	"Breezin'" (1976)

Music video
- "This Masquerade" by George Benson (1976) on YouTube

"This Masquerade"
George Benson's "This Masquerade" from Breezin'

"This Masquerade" is a song written by American singer and musician Leon Russell. It was originally recorded in 1972 by Russell for his album Carney and as a B-side for the album's hit single "Tight Rope". The song was then covered on Helen Reddy's 1972 album, I Am Woman. It was then recorded by American vocal duo, the Carpenters, for their 1973 album Now & Then and as the B-side of the Carpenters's single "Please Mr. Postman". Three years later, "This Masquerade" was recorded by American singer and guitarist George Benson, who released it on his 1976 album, Breezin'. Benson's version, featuring Jorge Dalto on piano, was released as a single and became the first big hit of his career.

== George Benson version ==
In 1976, "This Masquerade" was a top-ten pop and R&B hit for jazz guitarist/vocalist George Benson, who recorded it on his 1976 signature album Breezin'. It was his first single release. Benson's rendition is the only charting version of the song in the U.S. It reached number 10 on the Billboard Hot 100 and number three on the Hot Soul Singles chart. On the Cash Box Top 100 it reached #12. "This Masquerade" was most successful in Canada, where it reached number 8 on the Pop Singles chart as well as the Adult Contemporary chart.

In 1977, Benson's version won a Grammy Award for Record of the Year, while it was nominated for Song of the Year and for Best Pop Vocal Performance, Male.

=== Track listing ===
Year	Side	Song	Length	Interpreter	Writer/Composer	Producer	Album
1976	A-side	"This Masquerade"	3:17 (Edit single)	George Benson	Leon Russell	Tommy LiPuma	Breezin'
1976	B-side	"Lady"	5:56	George Benson	Ronnie Foster	Tommy LiPuma	Breezin'

=== Music video ===
George Benson recorded an official music video for "This Masquerade" in 1976. In the video, the song has the same length as the song's single (3:17).

=== Chart history ===
Chart (1976–77)	Peak position
Canada RPM Adult Contemporary	8
Canada RPM Top Singles	8
US Hot R&B/Hip-Hop Songs	3
US Adult Contemporary	6
US Billboard Hot 100	10

=== Personnel ===
- Lead vocals – George Benson
- Lead guitar – George Benson
- Conductor, arranger – Claus Ogerman
- Piano (soloist) – Jorge Dalto
- Rhythm guitar – Phil Upchurch
- Bass – Stanley Banks
- Drums – Harvey Mason
- Percussion – Ralph MacDonald
- Producer – Tommy LiPuma

== Trivia ==
- Leon Russell's original version is part of the soundtrack for The Exorcist director William Friedkin's psychological thriller film Bug. The Bug Soundtrack was released on May 22, 2007. It also appeared in the movie The Pursuit of Happyness.
- The Carpenters' version was also performed on TV with Ella Fitzgerald; the medley in which it was sung was subsequently released on the compilation As Time Goes By.
