= Light My Fire (Bob Thiele and Gábor Szabó album) =

Studio album by Bob Thiele and Gábor Szabó
- Released: February 1968
- Recorded: August 11 and September 14, 1967
- Genre: Crossover jazz
- Length: 35:58
- Label: Impulse!
- Producer: Bob Thiele

Gábor Szabó chronology
More Sorcery (1967)	Light My Fire (1968)	Wind, Sky and Diamonds (1967)

Light My Fire is an album by Hungarian jazz guitarist Gábor Szabó and American record producer Bob Thiele featuring performances recorded in 1967 for the Impulse! label.

Professional ratings
Review scores
Source	Rating
Allmusic	2/5 stars

== Track listing ==
All compositions by Gábor Szabó except as indicated

1. "Forest Flower" (Charles Lloyd) – 5:14
2. "Rainy Day Woman #12 & 35" (Bob Dylan) – 2:30
3. "Krishna" – 3:35
4. "Light My Fire" (Jim Morrison, Ray Manzarek, John Densmore, Robby Krieger) – 6:16
5. "Fakin' It" (Paul Simon) – 5:50
6. "Eight Miles High" (David Crosby, Gene Clark, Roger McGuinn) – 7:02
7. "Sophisticated Wheels" – 5:31

- Recorded in Los Angeles, California on August 11, 1967 (tracks 1 & 4) and September 14, 1967 (tracks 2, 3 & 5–7).

== Personnel ==
- Gábor Szabó – guitar
- Bob Thiele – director
- Ollie Mitchell, Ray Triscari (tracks 1 & 4), Jimmy Zito (tracks 1 & 4), Gary Barone (tracks 2, 3 & 5–7), Bud Brisbois (tracks 2, 3 & 5–7) – trumpet
- Lew McCreary, Mike Barone (tracks 1 & 4), Dick Leith (tracks 2, 3 & 5–7) – trombone
- Howard Johnson – tuba (tracks 1 & 4)
- Buddy Collette (tracks 1 & 4), Bob Hardaway (tracks 1 & 4), Bud Shank (tracks 1 & 4) – alto saxophone, tenor saxophone, flute
- Tom Scott – tenor saxophone
- Lincoln Mayorga – piano, harpsichord (tracks 1 & 4)
- Mike Melvoin – piano, organ, harpsichord (tracks 2, 3 & 5–7)
- Bill Plummer – sitar
- Dennis Budimir, Louis Morell – rhythm guitar
- Max Bennett (tracks 1 & 4), Carol Kaye (tracks 2, 3 & 5–7) – electric bass
- Jim Gordon (tracks 1 & 4), John Guerin (tracks 2, 3 5–7) – drums
- Gary Coleman (tracks 1 & 4), Emil Richards (tracks 2, 3 & 5–7) – percussion
- Sid Feller – arranger
- The California Dreamers: Ron Hicklin, Al Capps, Loren Farber, John Bahler, Tom Bahler, Ian Freebairn-Smith, Sally Stevens, Sue Allen, Jackie Ward – vocals (track 2)
