= Magical Connection =

Studio album by Gábor Szabó
- Released: 1970
- Recorded: May 27, June 3, 5, 10, 13, 15 & 27 and July 8, 1970; Los Angeles, California
- Genre: Crossover jazz
- Length: 35:23
- Label: Blue Thumb; BTS 8823
- Producer: Tommy LiPuma

Gábor Szabó chronology
Lena & Gabor (1969)	Magical Connection (1970)	High Contrast (1971)

Magical Connection is an album by Hungarian guitarist Gábor Szabó featuring performances recorded in 1970 and released on the Blue Thumb label.

== Reception ==
The Allmusic review states "Consciously more percussive -- and more commercial -- Szabo's newly formed sextet was clearly up to the challenges of combining rock with jazz. More an instrumental-pop confection, Magical Connection doesn't quite live up to its promise. But even as Szabo covers pop hits by Carpenters, Buffalo Springfield and John Sebastian, he often plays with great wit and solos with energetic dexterity".

Professional ratings
Review scores
Source	Rating
Allmusic	3/5 stars

== Track listing ==
1. "Sombrero Sam" (Charles Lloyd) - 5:14
2. "(They Long to Be) Close to You" (Burt Bacharach, Hal David) - 3:04
3. "Country Illusion" (Wolfgang Melz) - 3:45
4. "Lady With Child" (Chuck Blore, Jerry Wright, Don Richman) - 3:45
5. "Pretty Girl Why" (Stephen Stills) - 3:31
6. "Hum a Song" (Richard Ross) - 3:32
7. "Magical Connection" (John Sebastian) - 4:26
8. "Fred and Betty" (Gábor Szabó, Richard Thompson) - 4:53
9. "Love Theme from "Spartacus"" (Alex North) - 3:13

- Recorded in Los Angeles, California on May 27 (track 1), June 3 (track 6), June 5 (tracks 4 & 7), June 10 (track 3), June 13 (track 5), June 15 (track 2), June 27 (tracks 5, 8 & 9) and July 8 (overdubs), 1970

== Personnel ==
- Gábor Szabó - guitar
- Lynn Blessing - vibraphone
- Richard Thompson - keyboards
- Wolfgang Melz - bass
- Jim Keltner - drums
- Emil Richards, Hal Gordon - percussion
- Erno Neufeld - concertmaster
- George Kast, Marilyn Baker, Jack Gootkin, Henry Ferber, Ambrose Russo, Leonard Malarsky, Jerome Reisler - violin
- Allan Harshman, Myron Sandler - viola
- Anne Goodman, Frederick Seykora - cello
- Jules Chaikin - contractor
- Nick DeCaro - keyboards arranger, conductor

== Charts ==
Album – Billboard

Year	Chart	Position
1971/01/16	Billboard Best Selling Jazz LP's	13
