= Nightflight (Gábor Szabó album) =

Studio album by Gábor Szabó
- Released: 1976
- Genre: Jazz
- Label: Mercury
- Producer: Bundion Siggalucci

Gábor Szabó chronology
Macho (1975)	Nightflight (1976)	Faces (1977)

Professional ratings
Review scores
Source	Rating
DownBeat	1.5/5 stars
The Rolling Stone Jazz Record Guide	1/5 stars

Nightflight is an album by Hungarian guitarist Gábor Szabó, released in 1976. The album produced the biggest hit of his career, a remake of producer Bunny Sigler's song "Keep Smilin'".

== Track listing ==
1. "Concorde (Nightflight)" (Szabó, Richie Rome) – 6:48
2. "Funny Face" (Bunny Sigler, Morris Bailey, Richie Rome) – 2:59
3. "Baby Rattle Snake" (Bunny Sigler, Kim Miller) – 6:50
4. "Theme for Gabor" (Richie Rome) – 4:20
5. "Keep Smilin'" (Bunny Sigler, Allan Felder) – 7:24
6. "Every Minute Counts" (Szabó, Richie Rome) – 6:49
7. "Smooth Sailin'" (Mike Holden, Theodore Life) – 6:45

== Personnel ==
- Gábor Szabó – guitar
- Theodore Life – guitar
- Bundion Siggalucci (aka Bunny Sigler) – guitar, piano, vocals
- Raymond Earl – bass
- Scotty Miller – drums
- Johnnie McCants – conga, bongo
- Dexter Wansel – synthesizer
- James Sigler – organ
- string orchestra

== Sources ==
- Nightflight at AllMusic
