= Gabor Szabo Live =

Live album by Gábor Szabó with Charles Lloyd
- Released: 1974
- Recorded: 1972
- Venue: The Troubadour, West Hollywood, California
- Genre: Jazz
- Length: 36:46
- Label: Blue Thumb; BTS 6014
- Producer: Tommy LiPuma

Gábor Szabó chronology
High Contrast (1971)	Gabor Szabo Live (1974)	Small World (1972)

Gabor Szabo Live (also referred to as Live with Charles Lloyd featuring Spellbinder) is an album by Hungarian guitarist Gábor Szabó featuring performances recorded at The Troubadour in early 1972 and released on the Blue Thumb label in 1974.

== Reception ==
Professional ratings
Review scores
Source	Rating
Allmusic	3/5 stars

The Allmusic review states "Features Szabo where he shone brightest -- live. Good performances of reliable staples".

== Track listing ==
1. "Spellbinder" (Gábor Szabó) - 7:07
2. "Sombrero Sam" (Charles Lloyd) - 10:48
3. "Stormy" (Buddy Buie, James Cobb) - 8:55
4. "People" (Jule Styne, Bob Merrill) - 9:41

- Recorded at The Troubadour in West Hollywood, California in early 1972

== Personnel ==
- Gábor Szabó - guitar
- Charles Lloyd - flute (track 2)
- Tony Ortega - flute, echoplex (track 3)
- Tommy Eyre - keyboards (track 4)
- Wolfgang Melz - bass
- John Dentz - drums
- Mailto Correa - conga, percussion
