= Brazilian Classics =

Compilation album by Eliane Elias
- Released: September 16, 2003
- Recorded: December 1989 – October 1997
- Genre: Jazz
- Length: 72:39
- Label: Blue Note
- Producer: Eliane Elias, Randy Brecker, Johnny Chance

Eliane Elias chronology
Kissed by Nature (2002)	Brazilian Classics (2003)	Dreamer (2004)

Professional ratings
Review scores
Source	Rating
AllMusic	4/5 stars

Brazilian Classics is a compilation album by Brazilian jazz pianist Eliane Elias. It was recorded from December 1989 to October 1997 and initially released on September 16, 2003, by Blue Note. The release contains 16 songs taken from her previous eight studio albums. The album was re-released in 2006.

== Reception ==
Matt Collar of AllMusic stated, "While it would have been nice for Blue Note to include some rarities or alternate takes, as it stands Brazilian Classics works as a fitting representation of Elias' take on her home country's unique sound." Joshua Weiner writing for All About Jazz commented, "...Brazilian Classics is an appealing listen, thematically unified and impeccably produced. The hardcore jazz fan may do better with Elias's Plays Jobim album, from which many of the best tracks with Gomez and DeJohnette are taken. But bossa nova fanatics, or maybe those wishing for a warm Brazilian breeze in the dead of winter, will enjoy this generous selection of Elias's work."

== Track listing ==
No.	Title	Writer(s)	Length
1.	"Passarim"	Antônio Carlos Jobim	5:11
2.	"Chega de Saudade"	Jobim; Vinicius de Moraes	3:50
3.	"Carioca Nights (Noites Cariocas)"	Jacob do Bandolim	5:09
4.	"Garota de Ipanema (Girl From Ipanema)"	Jobim; de Moraes	3:53
5.	"Milton Nascimento Medley"	Ronaldo Bastos; Fernando Brant; Milton Nascimento	7:50
6.	"Waters of March / Água De Beber"	Jobim	4:46
7.	"One Note Samba"	Jobim	4:25
8.	"Crystal and Lace"	Eliane Elias	4:13
9.	"Jazz 'n' Samba (Só Danço Samba)"	Jobim; de Moraes	2:07
10.	"Brazil (Aquarela do Brasil)"	Ary Barroso	4:59
11.	"Illuminados"	Ivan Lins; Victor Manoel N. Martins	3:10
12.	"Jet Samba (Samba do Avião)"	Jobim	5:14
13.	"Wave"	Jobim	3:45
14.	"Black Orpheus (Manhã De Carnaval)"	Luiz Bonfá	6:40
15.	"Dindi"	Jobim	5:46
16.	"O Polichinelo (Clown)"	Heitor Villa-Lobos	1:38
Total length:			72:39
