= Jazz Meets the Symphony =

Studio album by Lalo Schifrin
- Released: 1993
- Recorded: November 1992
- Studio: CTS Studios, London
- Genre: Jazz & 20th-century classical music
- Length: 64:38
- Label: Atlantic
- Producer: Lalo Schifrin

Lalo Schifrin chronology
Romancing the Film (1992)	Jazz Meets the Symphony (1993)	More Jazz Meets the Symphony (1993)

Jazz Meets the Symphony is an album by Argentine-American composer, pianist and conductor Lalo Schifrin with bassist Ray Brown, drummer Grady Tate and the London Philharmonic Orchestra recorded in 1992 and released on the Atlantic label in 1993.

Schifrin's musical arrangement for the track, "Dizzy Gillespie Fireworks" was nominated for the 1994 Grammy Award for Best Arrangement on an Instrumental.

== Reception ==
The Allmusic review by Scott Yanow stated, "...Most intriguing among Schifrin's arrangements are Echoes of Duke Ellington and Dizzy Gillespie Fireworks, which are really medleys of Duke's and Dizzy's songs. Not all of the shorter pieces... are too essential, and, on the whole, Schifrin's follow-up project (More Jazz Meets the Symphony) would result in a stronger record. However, this generally interesting set is still worth exploring; it was good to hear Lalo Schifrin in a jazz setting again". He gave the album a four star rating, which is generally reserved for releases of high merit.

Professional ratings
Review scores
Source	Rating
Allmusic	4/5 stars

== Track listing ==
1. "Battle Hymn of the Republic" (Traditional, arranged by Schifrin) – 6:28
2. "Echoes of Duke Ellington" (Duke Ellington, arranged by Schifrin) – 12:48
3. "Bach to the Blues" (Lalo Schifrin) – 5:25
4. "Brush Strokes" (Lalo Schifrin) – 3:03
5. "I Can't Get Started" (Vernon Duke, Ira Gershwin, arranged by Schifrin) – 3:31
6. "Brazilian Impressions" (Luiz Bonfá, Antonio Carlos Jobim, arranged by Schifrin) – 5:35
7. "Blues in the Bassment" (Ray Brown, arranged by Schifrin) – 4:16
8. "The Fox" (Lalo Schifrin) – 4:50
9. "As Time Goes By" (Herman Hupfeld, arranged by Schifrin) – 5:22
10. "Dizzy Gillespie Fireworks" (Dizzy Gillespie, arranged by Schifrin) – 13:34

== Personnel ==
Source =

- Lalo Schifrin - piano, arranger, conductor
- Ray Brown - bass
- Grady Tate - drums
- London Philharmonic Orchestra
