= List of Billboard 200 number-one albums of 1976 =

These are the Billboard magazine number-one albums of 1976, per the Billboard 200.

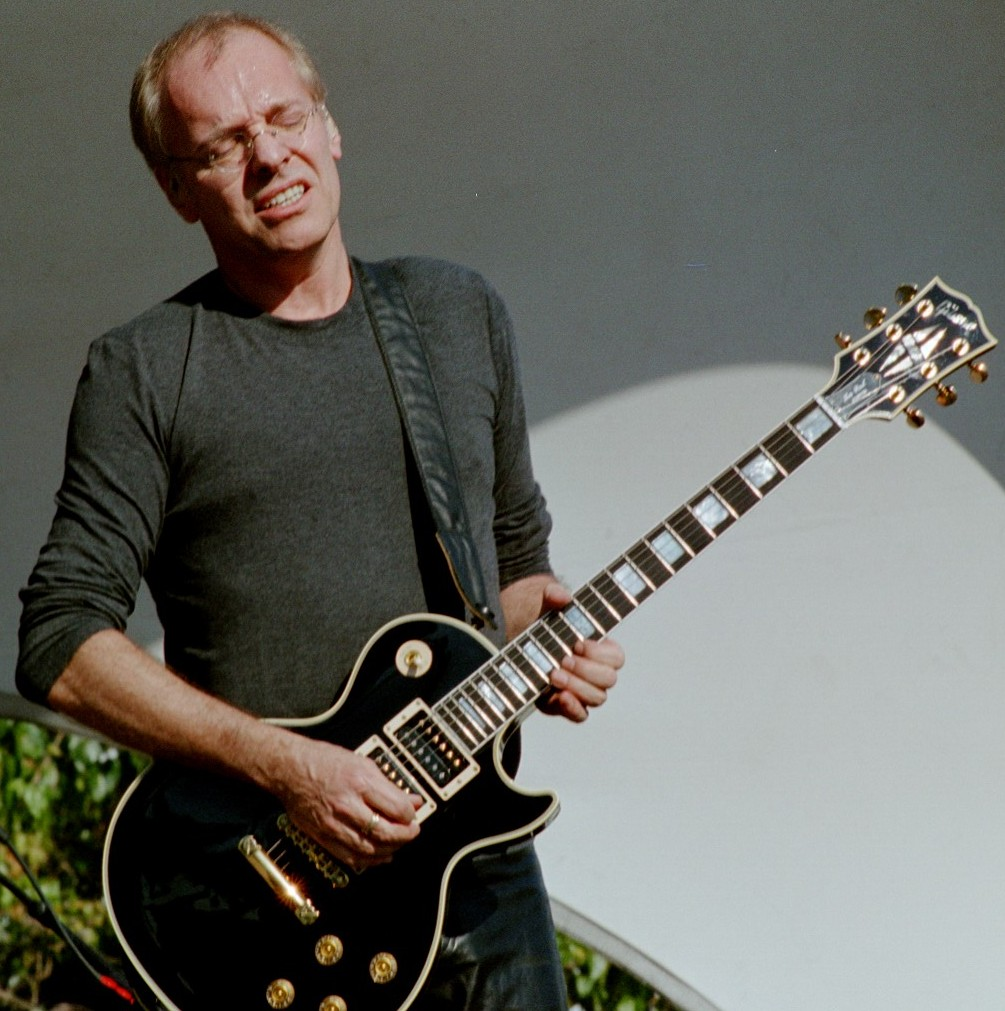
Peter Frampton's live album Frampton Comes Alive! was the best-selling album of 1976, spending ten non-consecutive weeks at number one.

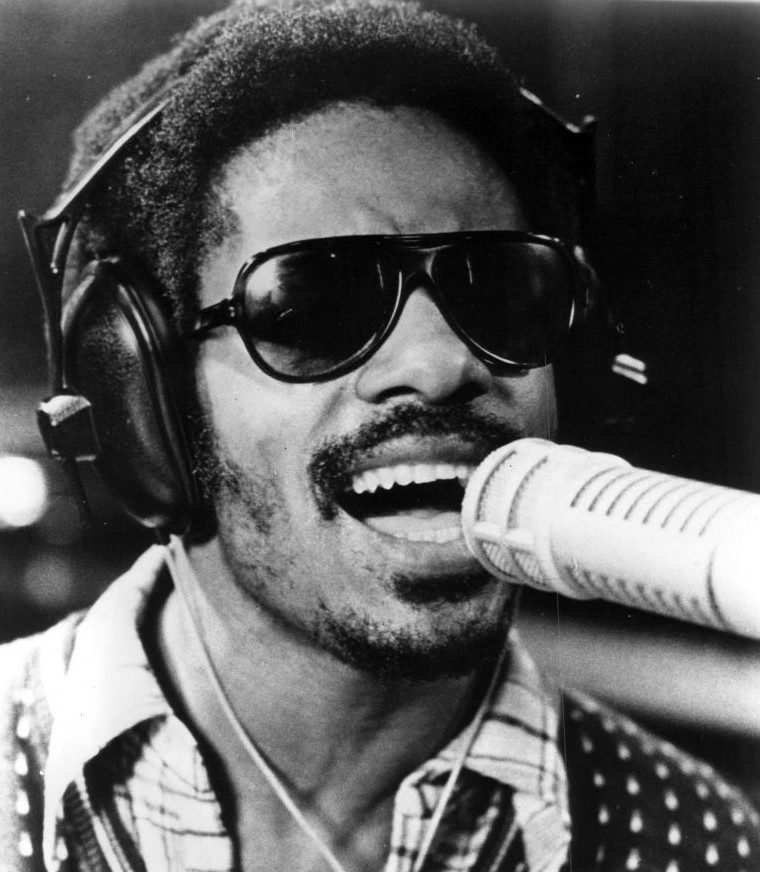
Songs in the Key of Life by Stevie Wonder spent 11 consecutive weeks at number one in 1976, along with a further two weeks in 1977.

== Chart history ==
Key
†	Indicates best performing album of 1976

Issue date	Album	Artist(s)	Label	Ref.
January 3	Chicago IX: Chicago's Greatest Hits	Chicago	Columbia	
January 10	Chicago IX: Chicago's Greatest Hits	Chicago	Columbia	
January 17	Gratitude	Earth, Wind & Fire	Columbia	
January 24	Gratitude	Earth, Wind & Fire	Columbia	
January 31	Gratitude	Earth, Wind & Fire	Columbia	
February 7	Desire	Bob Dylan	Columbia	
February 14	Desire	Bob Dylan	Columbia	
February 21	Desire	Bob Dylan	Columbia	
February 28	Desire	Bob Dylan	Columbia	
March 6	Desire	Bob Dylan	Columbia	
March 13	Their Greatest Hits (1971-1975)	Eagles	Asylum	
March 20	Their Greatest Hits (1971-1975)	Eagles	Asylum	
March 27	Their Greatest Hits (1971-1975)	Eagles	Asylum	
April 3	Their Greatest Hits (1971-1975)	Eagles	Asylum	
April 10	Frampton Comes Alive! †	Peter Frampton	A&M	
April 17	Their Greatest Hits (1971–1975)	Eagles	Asylum	
April 24	Wings at the Speed of Sound	Wings	Capitol	
May 1	Presence	Led Zeppelin	Swan Song	
May 8	Presence	Led Zeppelin	Swan Song	
May 15	Black and Blue	The Rolling Stones	Rolling Stones	
May 22	Black and Blue	The Rolling Stones	Rolling Stones	
May 29	Wings at the Speed of Sound	Wings	Capitol	
June 5	Black and Blue	The Rolling Stones	Rolling Stones	
June 12	Black and Blue	The Rolling Stones	Rolling Stones	
June 19	Wings at the Speed of Sound	Wings	Capitol	
June 26	Wings at the Speed of Sound	Wings	Capitol	
July 3	Wings at the Speed of Sound	Wings	Capitol	
July 10	Wings at the Speed of Sound	Wings	Capitol	
July 17	Wings at the Speed of Sound	Wings	Capitol	
July 24	Frampton Comes Alive!†	Peter Frampton	A&M	
July 31	Breezin'	George Benson	Warner Bros.	
August 7	Breezin'	George Benson	Warner Bros.	
August 14	Frampton Comes Alive! †	Peter Frampton	A&M	
August 21	Frampton Comes Alive! †	Peter Frampton	A&M	
August 28	Frampton Comes Alive! †	Peter Frampton	A&M	
September 4	Fleetwood Mac	Fleetwood Mac	Reprise	
September 11	Frampton Comes Alive! †	Peter Frampton	A&M	
September 18	Frampton Comes Alive! †	Peter Frampton	A&M	
September 25	Frampton Comes Alive! †	Peter Frampton	A&M	
October 2	Frampton Comes Alive! †	Peter Frampton	A&M	
October 9	Frampton Comes Alive! †	Peter Frampton	A&M	
October 16	Songs in the Key of Life	Stevie Wonder	Tamla	
October 23	Songs in the Key of Life	Stevie Wonder	Tamla	
October 30	Songs in the Key of Life	Stevie Wonder	Tamla	
November 6	Songs in the Key of Life	Stevie Wonder	Tamla	
November 13	Songs in the Key of Life	Stevie Wonder	Tamla	
November 20	Songs in the Key of Life	Stevie Wonder	Tamla	
November 27	Songs in the Key of Life	Stevie Wonder	Tamla	
December 4	Songs in the Key of Life	Stevie Wonder	Tamla	
December 11	Songs in the Key of Life	Stevie Wonder	Tamla	
December 18	Songs in the Key of Life	Stevie Wonder	Tamla	
December 25	Songs in the Key of Life	Stevie Wonder	Tamla	

== See also ==
- 1976 in music
- List of number-one albums (United States)
