= Belsta River =

Studio album by Gábor Szabó
- Released: 1978
- Recorded: January 6 & 7, 1978; Stockholm, Sweden
- Genre: Jazz
- Length: 40:03
- Labels: Four Leaf Clover; FLC-5030
- Producer: Lars Samuelson

Gábor Szabó chronology
Faces (1977)	Belsta River (1978)	Femme Fatale (1981)

Belsta River is an album by Hungarian guitarist Gábor Szabó featuring performances recorded in Stockholm in 1977 and released on the Swedish Four Leaf Clover label.

== Reception ==
The Allmusic review states "this was Szabo's last fine moment on record, but what a moment it was".

Professional ratings
Review scores
Source	Rating
Allmusic	4.5/5 stars

== Track listing ==
All compositions by Gábor Szabó except as indicated

1. "24 Carat" - 14:05
2. "Django" (John Lewis) - 4:15
3. "First Tune in the Morning" - 13:11
4. "Stormy" (Buddy Buie, James Cobb) - 8:32

The album was recorded at Europa Film Studio in Stockholm, Sweden on January 6 & 7, 1978

== Personnel ==
- Gábor Szabó - guitar
- Janne Schaffer - guitar
- Wlodek Gulgowski - synthesizers, acoustic and electric piano
- Pekka Pohjola - bass
- Malando Gassama - congas, percussion
- Peter Sundell - drums
