= Lena & Gabor =

Studio album by Lena Horne and Gábor Szabó
- Released: 1970
- Recorded: October and November 1969; Los Angeles, California and New York City
- Genre: Crossover jazz
- Length: 36:02
- Label: Skye; SK 15
- Producer: Gary McFarland, Gábor Szabó

Gábor Szabó chronology
1969 (1969)	Lena & Gabor (1970)	Magical Connection (1970)

Lena Horne chronology
Soul (1966)	Lena & Gabor (1969)	Harry & Lena (1970)

Watch What Happens Cover

Lena & Gabor is an album by American vocalist Lena Horne and Hungarian guitarist Gábor Szabó, arranged and produced by Gary McFarland. It was recorded in 1969 and released on the Skye label. The album was Lena Horne's first album release in four years and saw her return to the charts with the single "Watch What Happens". The Skye Records label declared bankruptcy in 1970 and the backcatalog was acquired by Buddha Records and the album was re-issued in 1971 as Watch What Happens.

== Reception ==
The Allmusic review states "Lena & Gabor is an unexpected delight, capturing a soulfulness and sass largely absent from the singer's previous efforts. Producer and arranger Gary McFarland's candy-coated orchestral settings afford Horne the opportunity to step out of the elegant but often stuffy refinement of her classic LPs and let down her hair".

Professional ratings
Review scores
Source	Rating
Allmusic	4/5 stars

== Track listing ==
1. "Rocky Raccoon" (John Lennon, Paul McCartney) – 3:30
2. "Something" (George Harrison) – 3:09
3. "Everybody's Talkin'" (Fred Neil) – 2:55
4. "In My Life" (Lennon, McCartney) – 2:56
5. "Yesterday When I Was Young" (Charles Aznavour, Herbert Kretzmer) – 4:07
6. "Watch What Happens" (Michel Legrand, Norman Gimbel, Jacques Demy) – 4:01
7. "My Mood Is You" (Carl Sigman) – 4:43
8. "Message to Michael" (Burt Bacharach, Hal David) – 3:17
9. "Nightwind" (Robert Kessler, Robert Scott) – 3:39
10. "The Fool on the Hill" (Lennon, McCartney) – 3:45

- Recorded in Los Angeles, California and at A&R Recording Studios in New York between October and November 1969

== Personnel ==
- Lena Horne – vocals
- Cornell Dupree, Eric Gale, Gábor Szabó – guitar
- Richard Tee – organ
- Chuck Rainey – electric bass
- Grady Tate – drums
- Gary McFarland – arranger, conductor
- Unknown strings and horns
- The Howard Roberts Chorale – vocals
- Howard Roberts – vocal arrangement
