= More Jazz Meets the Symphony =

Studio album by Lalo Schifrin
- Released: July 26, 1994
- Recorded: December 1993
- Studios: CTS Studios, London
- Genres: Jazz & 20th-century classical music
- Length: 1:01:34
- Labels: Atlantic; Atlantic Jazz 82653
- Producer: Lalo Schifrin

Lalo Schifrin chronology
Jazz Meets the Symphony (1992)	More Jazz Meets the Symphony (1994)	Firebird: Jazz Meets the Symphony No. 3 (1995)

More Jazz Meets the Symphony is an album by Argentine-American composer, pianist and conductor Lalo Schifrin with bassist Ray Brown, drummer Grady Tate, trumpeter Jon Faddis, multi-instrumentalists Paquito D'Rivera and James Morrison, and the London Philharmonic Orchestra recorded in 1993 and released on the Atlantic label. The album was the second in Schifrin's highly acclaimed "Jazz Meets the Symphony" series.

== Reception ==
The Allmusic review by Richard S. Ginell stated "Breaking the long-standing curse of sequels, the second installment of Schifrin's Jazz Meets the Symphony series is even better than the first. For one thing, Schifrin was able to place his own distinctive orchestral stamp more firmly upon these arrangements, sometimes reaching into his bag of tricks familiar to us from his film cues. For another, he has three expert, often fiery solo horns on tap here".

Professional ratings
Review scores
Source	Rating
Allmusic	4/5 stars

== Track listing ==
Source =

1. Sketches of Miles: "All Blues" / "So What" / "Milestones" / "Concierto de Aranjuez" / "On Green Dolphin Street" / "Oleo" / "Four" / "Move" (Miles Davis / Davis / Davis / Joaquin Rodrigo / Bronislaw Kaper / Sonny Rollins / Davis / Denzil Best, medley arranged by Schifrin) - 12:27
2. "Down Here on the Ground" (Lalo Schifrin) - 6:00
3. "Chano" (Lalo Schifrin) - 7:44
4. "Begin the Beguine" (Cole Porter, arranged by Schifrin) - 7:07
5. "Django" (John Lewis, arranged by Schifrin) - 5:53
6. "Old Friends" (Lalo Schifrin) - 4:40
7. "Madrigal" (Lalo Schifrin) - 4:04
8. Portrait of Louis Armstrong: "Nobody Knows the Trouble I've Seen" / "When It's Sleepy Time Down South" / "Someday" / "After You've Gone" / "St. Louis Blues" / "Some of These Days" / "Struttin' with Some Barbeque" / "I Can't Give You Anything but Love, Baby" (Traditional / Clarence Muse, Leon René, Otis René / Lil Hardin Armstrong, Don Raye / Henry Creamer, Turner Layton / W. C. Handy/Shelton Brooks / Armstrong / Dorothy Fields, Jimmy McHugh, medley arranged by Schifrin) - 13:39

== Personnel ==
Source =

- Lalo Schifrin - piano, arranger, conductor
- Jon Faddis - trumpet
- Paquito D'Rivera - clarinet, alto saxophone
- James Morrison - trumpet, flugelhorn, trombone
- Ray Brown - bass
- Grady Tate - drums
- London Philharmonic Orchestra
