= Femme Fatale (Gábor Szabó album) =

Studio album by Gábor Szabó
- Released: 1981
- Recorded: March 27 & 30, June 6, 12 & 30, 1979; Fidelity Recording Studio, Studio City, Los Angeles
- Genre: Jazz
- Length: 36:22
- Label: Pepita; SLPR 707
- Producer: Gábor Szabó

Gábor Szabó chronology
Belsta River (1978)	Femme Fatale (1981)

Femme Fatale is the final album by Hungarian guitarist Gábor Szabó featuring performances recorded in 1979 and released on the Hungarian Pepita label in 1981.

== Reception ==
The AllMusic review states: "'Out of the Night' interestingly pairs him with pianist Chick Corea. But the remainder of the record is a standard late-'70s fusion date."

Professional ratings
Review scores
Source	Rating
AllMusic	2/5 stars

== Track listing ==
All compositions by Gábor Szabó except as indicated

1. "Femme Fatale" – 8:13
2. "Zingaro" (Antonio Carlos Jobim) – 7:08
3. "Serena" (James Harrah) – 3:37
4. "A Thousand Times" – 9:17
5. "Out of the Night" (Chick Corea) – 8:07
- Recorded at Fidelity Recording Studio in Studio City, Los Angeles

== Personnel ==
- Gábor Szabó – guitar
- Chick Corea – piano (tracks 1, 4, 5)
- Leon Bisquera – keyboards
- James Harrah – guitar
- David Roney – electric bass
- Hugh Moran – drums
- Everette Bryson – percussion
- Gary Grant – trumpet, flugelhorn
- Jerry Hey – trumpet, flugelhorn
- William Reichenbach – trombone
- Kim Hutchcroft – reeds
- Larry Williams – reeds
- Lawrence Sonderling – violin
- Bobby Dubow – violin
- Ken Yerke – violin
- John Wittenberg – violin
- Sheldon Sanov – violin
- Carol Shive – violin
- Pamela Goldsmith – viola
- Arthur Royval – viola
- Michael Nowak – viola
- Ronald Cooper – cello
- Ray Kelley – cello
- David Campbell – arranger, conductor
