= Soft Samba Strings =

Studio album by Gary McFarland
- Released: 1967
- Recorded: October 27, 1966 at Van Gelder Studio, Englewood Cliffs, New Jersey and November 7, 1966 at CTS Studios, London
- Genre: Jazz
- Label: Verve – 8682
- Producer: Creed Taylor

Gary McFarland chronology
The in Sound (1964)	Soft Samba Strings (1967)	Scorpio and Other Signs (1968)

Professional ratings
Review scores
Source	Rating
AllMusic	1.5/5 stars

Soft Samba Strings is a 1965 album by jazz arranger and vibraphonist Gary McFarland.

== Reception ==
Douglas Payne reviewed the album for AllMusic and compared it dismissively to Soft Samba writing that it was "A misleading title that has less to do with Soft Samba and more to do with McFarland's similar feature for Zoot Sims (Waiting Game). Rather dull, perhaps because a strong soloist like Sims is missing".

== Track listing ==
1. "Full Moon and Empty Arms" (Buddy Kaye, Ted Mossman) – 2:20
2. "Skylark" (Hoagy Carmichael, Johnny Mercer) – 3:00
3. "I Know The Meaning" (Pyotr Ilyich Tchaikovsky) – 3:07
4. "Manhã de Carnaval (Morning of the Carnival)" (Luiz Bonfá, Antônio Maria) – 2:50
5. "The Lamp Is Low" (Bert Shefter, Mitchell Parish, Peter DeRose) – 4:55
6. "My Reverie" (Larry Clinton, Claude Debussy) – 2:50
7. "These Are the Things I Love" (Harold Barlow, Lew Harris) – 2:15
8. "Theme From "13"" (Gary McFarland) – 2:20
9. "Once We Loved" (McFarland) – 1:45
10. "Our Love" (Buddy Bernier, Larry Clinton, Robert D. Emmerich) – 2:20

== Personnel ==
- Gary McFarland – arranger, vibraphone, vocals
- Jack Parnell – conductor

Production

- Creed Taylor – producer
- Pete Turner, Acy Lehmann – cover design
- Rudy Van Gelder – engineer (Englewood Cliffs)
- Jack Clegg – engineer (London)
- Val Valentin – director of engineering
