= Soft Samba =

Studio album by Gary McFarland
- Released: March 1965
- Recorded: June 15 and 16, September 3 & October 7, 1964
- Studio: Van Gelder Studio, Englewood Cliffs, New Jersey
- Genre: Jazz
- Length: 28:57
- Label: Verve - 8603
- Producer: Creed Taylor

Gary McFarland chronology
Point of Departure (1963)	Soft Samba (1965)	The In Sound (1965)

Professional ratings
Review scores
Source	Rating
AllMusic	4/5 stars

Soft Samba is a 1965 album by jazz arranger and vibraphonist Gary McFarland. A follow-up album, Soft Samba Strings, was released in 1966.

== Reception ==
The initial Billboard magazine review from February 20, 1965, wrote that even though "A pair of stretch socks, two ounces of sherry, and a "Soft Samba" cocktail recipe" were being used to promote the album, it would "curry favor with the public without the promotion incentives" and "The artist's humming helps too". Boys' Life magazine wrote that "You'd think that the artists in this album couldn't talk because all you hear is "Ba-ba, baya-baya, byu-byu" and so on with little relief. The results are unique (as you'd expect) but pleasing...We found the wedding of the soft samba to rock 'n' roll a joyous union thanks to the musical ministry of Mr. McFarland".

== Track listing ==
1. "Ringo, Won't You Marry Me" (Linda Laurie, Jerry Mack) – 1:46
2. "From Russia with Love" (Lionel Bart) – 2:34
3. "She Loves You" (John Lennon, Paul McCartney) – 2:16
4. "A Hard Day's Night" (Lennon, McCartney) – 3:04
5. "The Good Life" (Sacha Distel, Jack Reardon) – 2:05
6. "More (Theme from Mondo Cane)" (Riz Ortolani, Nino Oliviero, Marcello Ciorciolini, Norman Newell) – 2:18
7. "And I Love Her" (Lennon, McCartney) – 3:55
8. "The Love Goddess" (Percy Faith, Mack David) – 1:57
9. "I Want to Hold Your Hand" (Lennon, McCartney) – 3:13
10. "Emily" (Johnny Mandel, Johnny Mercer) – 1:51
11. "California, Here I Come" (Buddy DeSylva, Al Jolson, Joseph Meyer) – 1:52
12. "La Vie en Rose" (Louiguy, Édith Piaf, David) – 2:06

== Personnel ==
- Gary McFarland - arranger, vibraphone
- Jimmy Cleveland - trombone
- Seldon Powell, Spencer Sinatra - flute
- Patty Bowen - piano
- Antônio Carlos Jobim, Kenny Burrell - guitar
- Richard Davis - double bass
- Arnie Wise, Sol Gubin, Willie Bobo - percussion

Production

- Creed Taylor - producer
- Michael J. Malatak - cover design
- Lester Bookbinder - cover photo
- Wally King - liner notes
- Rudy Van Gelder - engineer
- Val Valentin - director of engineering
