= Jimmy Stewart (musician) =

American guitarist (born 1937)

- Born: September 8, 1937 (age 88); San Francisco, California, U.S.
- Genres: Jazz, classical, rock
- Occupations: Musician, composer, author
- Instruments: Fiddle, guitar, banjo
- Years active: 1952–present

Jimmy Stewart (born September 8, 1937) is an American guitarist who has performed a wide variety of music since the late 1950s. He is best known for his association with jazz guitarist Gábor Szabó, but he has been extensively involved in many genres of music as an arranger, conductor, producer, orchestrator, musical director, and educator. Stewart has appeared on over 1,200 recordings.

== Early life and education ==
Stewart was born on September 8, 1937, in San Francisco, California. At the age of four, he commenced piano lessons, switching to guitar when he was eight. He sneaked out of the family house late at night to go to clubs. A professional by age 15, he received the opportunity to play with Earl Hines when he was 16.

After working in Lake Tahoe, he studied at the College of San Mateo, earning a degree in 1957, and the next year married Janet McCoy. In 1960 he attended the Chicago School of Music, where he was a student of classical guitarist and teacher, Richard Pick. He received a certificate in composition and modern arranging from the Berklee School of Music in 1964. He also engaged in private studies with Albert Harris (composition, film scoring and orchestration), Jack Lee (conducting), George M. Smith (classical guitar and studio guitar), Paul Miller (fretted instruments), and Bud Young (dance band arrangements, harmony, and composition from 16th–18th centuries).

== US Army ==
From 1958 to 1960, Stewart served in the US Army, where he became a broadcast specialist. He recorded the 1959 Playboy Jazz Festival for the Armed Forces radio station, was musical director for the weekly radio show, At Ease Show, and produced Parade Rest for St. Louis television. He also played guitar on variety shows and produced radio programs.

== Los Angeles ==
Following his time with Szabó, Stewart moved to Los Angeles, where he became involved in several different areas of music. He recorded his album, The Touch, about which guitarist Jim Ferguson wrote in Guitar Player, "Throughout, Jimmy displays his imagination, depicting a fictional encounter between Szabo and Carlos Santana, as well as paying tribute to influences Jimmy Raney, Jim Hall and Wes Montgomery. In addition to playing jazz, Stewart played heavy metal next to Tommy Bolin at a music industry trade show in Los Angeles.

== Studio musician ==
As a studio musician, Stewart has played on over 1,200 sessions. He was one of the first studio guitarists to introduce the rock guitar to soundtracks and commercials. His versatility made him in demand for many decades. Chris Colombi, Jr. wrote of Stewart in 1986, "His playing and tastes run back to the blues, Charlie Christian and Django Reinhardt, and forward to Al DiMeola, Tony Purrone and Jim Hall."

In Encyclopedia of Jazz in the Seventies, music critic Leonard Feather said that Stewart "attributes his inspiration to a range of influences, from Segovia and Bartók to Charlie Christian and Laurindo Almeida."

Since settling in Los Angeles, Stewart worked as musical director for Lainie Kazan (arranger and conductor on tours from 1972 to 1979) and as an arranger for tours of Andy Williams. He worked with Gary Crosby, Chita Rivera, and Rod McKuen; arranged for John Gary, Lou Gottlieb, Alex Hassel, Chad Mitchell and Tonilee Scott; and coached Linda Ronstadt, Juice Newton, and Lee Ritenour.

== TV, film, stage ==
Stewart's guitar playing has appeared in such movies as Paint Your Wagon, Topaz, Some Kind of Nut, Nice Dreams, Minus One, and Chain of Command. In television, his work has appeared on music for Ironside, The Burt Bacharach Special, The Mike Douglas Show, and The Tonight Show. He also played music for stage shows, such as How to Succeed in Business Without Really Trying, Half a Sixpence, 110 in the Shade, No Strings, Funny Girl, Here's Love, Bye Bye Birdie, Kiss Me Kate, West Side Story, The Boy-Friend, and Man of La Mancha.

== Educator and author ==
Stewart has written over twenty books, including Ear Training for the Guitarist, Sight Reading for the Guitarist, A Tribute to Classical Guitar, The Complete Jazz Guitarist, Rock Guitar, and Heavy Metal Guitar.

Stewart was founder of the guitar program at Dick Grove Music Workshops and was chairman of the Music Department at the Audio/Video Institute of Technology in Hollywood, conducting master classes in record production and music recording history. Stewart also taught guitar at the Musicians Institute; taught music theory, orchestration, and guitar at the University of Southern California; and helped to build the guitar department at Dick Grove Workshops. In the mid-1980s, one of Stewart's guitar students was Linda Ronstadt.

He wrote the monthly column, "The Complete Musician", for Guitar Player from 1971 to 1981 and has written for Jazz Educators Journal, Sound & Recording Magazine, OnStage Magazine and Recording Engineer & Producer Magazine.

== Composer ==
As a classical composer, Stewart has written more than fifteen compositions, including ten Etudes for Classical Guitar, Concertino for Electric Guitar and Orchestra, Folk Songs for Orchestra, Sonata for Unaccompanied Violin, and two string quartets.

== Golf and hypnosis ==
An enthusiastic golfer and a student of the game, Stewart wrote Mastering Golf Through Hypnosis in 2009 and produced a recording of the book. He studied at the Hypnosis Motivation Institute in Los Angeles. He has been an assistant golf coach who teaches children and has also appeared on golf infomercials.

== Discography ==
Solo

- 1977 Fire Flower (Catalyst)
- 1981 Street Jazz (Techeku)
- 1987 The Touch (BlackHawk)
- 1987 Evolution of Jazz Guitar (Mel Bay; only issued on cassette)
- 1989 Rock Tracks (Alfred; only issued on cassette)
- 1991 Power Trax (CPP/Belwin)
- 1992 Blues Trax (CPP/Belwin)
- 1992 Heavy Metal Guitar (CPP/Belwin)
- 1992 Mode Mania (CPP/Belwin)
- 1993 The Art, History and Style of Jazz Guitar (CPP/Belwin)
- 1994 The Complete Jazz Guitarist (Mel Bay)
- 1998 Memorabilia (J-Bird)
- 2005 Night People (Apophis)

With Gábor Szabó

- 1967 The Sorcerer (Impulse!)
- 1967 More Sorcery (Impulse!)
- 1968 Bacchanal (Sky)
- 1968 Dreams (Sky)
- 1977 Faces (Mercury) - one track only

== Classical compositions ==
- Opus 1–10 Etudes for Classical Guitar
- Opus 11 Folk Tunes for Orchestra
- Opus 12 Prelude for Piano
- Opus 13 Study in Percussion
- Opus 14 Passacaglia for Flute
- Opus 15 Homage de Albert Harris for Classical Guitar
- Opus 16 Fantasia for Classical Guitar
- Opus 17 Sonata for Violin
- Opus 18 Concertino for Electric Guitar and Orchestra
- Opus 19 String Quartet 1 Plus D. B.
- Opus 20 String Quartet II Plus Classical Guitar
- Opus 21 Homage de Maruro Giuliani
- Opus 22 Homge de Dionisio Agnardo
- Opus 23 Homage de Marteo Carcassi
- Opus 24 Homage de Napoleon Coste
- Opus 25 Guitar Concerto No. 1 for Classical Guitar and Orchestra
- Opus 26 Guitar Concerto No. 2 for Jazz Guitar and Orchestra
- Opus 27 Guitar Concerto No. 3 for Contemporary Guitar and Orchestra

== Articles ==
- "The Complete Musician" 1971–1981 (Guitar Player monthly column)
- "An Engineer's Guide to Music" Parts One and Two (Recording Engineer & Producer)
- "Quincy Jones with Engineer Bruce Swedien: The Consummate Production Team" (Recording Engineer & Producer)
- "The Roots and Branches of Musical Styles" (Jazz Educators Journal)
- "Sound Analyze" (Sound & Recording)
- "In Session" (On Stage)
- "Going Beyond Natural Sound" (Recording Engineer & Producer)
- "Personal Use Studios" (Recording Engineer & Producer)
- "Alpha Studios" (Recording Engineer & Producer)
- "Keith Olsen: Producer" (Recording Engineer & Producer)

== Books ==
- 1968 Wes Montgomery Jazz Guitar Method, Robbins
- 1970 The Howard Roberts Guitar Book, Playback
- 1971 Carol Kaye's Basslines Five, Gwyn
- 1975 Chord/Melody, Apophis
- 1975 Jazz Guitar, Apophis
- 1976 15 Guitar Etudes, Apophis
- 1977 Ear Training for the Guitarist, Apophis
- 1977 Guitar for Songwriters, Grove
- 1977 Orchestration and Arranging, Apophis
- 1977 Pentatonic Madness, Apophis
- 1977 Sight Reading for the Guitarist, Apophis
- 1978 A Tribute to Classical Guitar, GPI
- 1978 Studio Guitar, Apophis
- 1980 Contemporary Rhythm Playing for the Guitarist, Apophis
- 1985 Basic Guitar, GPI/Hal Leonard
- 1985 Rock Guitar, GPI/Hal Leonard
- 1987 Evolution of Jazz Guitar, Mel Bay
- 1987 Rock Guitar, Alfred
- 1989 The Working Guitarist, Volume 1, Alexander Publishing
- 1991 Power Trax, CPP/Belwin
- 1992 Blues Trax, CPP/Belwin
- 1992 Heavy Metal Guitar, CPP/Belwin
- 1992 Mode Mania, CPP/Belwin
- 1993 The Art, History, and Style of Jazz Guitar, CPP/Belwin
- 1994 The Complete Jazz Guitarist, Mel Bay
- 1997 Easy Jazz Riffs for Guitar, Cherry Lane
- 1997 Jazz Harmony, Cherry Lane
- 1998 Easy Jazz Riffs for Guitar, Japanese Edition, Shinko
