= Skye Records =

- Founded: 1968
- Founder: Norman Schwartz, Gary McFarland, Gábor Szabó, Cal Tjader
- Defunct: 1970
- Status: Defunct
- Genre: Jazz, pop
- Country of origin: U.S.
- Location: New York

Skye Records was a United States–based record label established in early 1968 by music executive/producer/artist manager Norman Schwartz, in partnership with musician/arranger Gary McFarland, guitarist Gábor Szabó, and vibraphonist Cal Tjader.

According to an April 6, 1968, front page article in Billboard, the label was intended to attract "established artists who are unhappy with their present record company affiliation." The article said that Schwartz "believes that too many recording artists have been shortchanged when it comes to their agreements with record companies and that they have not been given enough control over their recording output." The label offered artists profit-sharing, insurance benefits, and performance subsidies.

Its catalog was primarily jazz, although some Skye artists offered pop, soft rock, and orchestral concepts. The three musician partners each released three solo albums on the label. Szabó also collaborated with vocalist Lena Horne on the release, Lena and Gabor, for which McFarland provided arrangements. McFarland arranged and conducted the Grady Tate album Slaves, and produced and arranged the soft rock album Genesis, by Wendy and Bonnie.

The Horne/Szabó album scored a surprising Top 40 hit in 1970 with "Watch What Happens."

The label released 21 studio albums before declaring bankruptcy in 1970. The rights to the label's catalog were retained by Schwartz, who licensed a handful of titles to Buddha.

In 1978 Schwartz founded Gryphon Records, through which he reissued a number of Skye titles, as well as new recordings by such artists as Mel Torme, Michel Legrand, Woody Herman and Buddy Rich.

The U.S.-founded Skye has no relation to a label of the same name founded in Scotland in 2003.

== Artists ==
- Ruth Brown
- Lena Horne
- Gary McFarland
- Airto Moreira
- Armando Peraza
- Chuck Rainey
- Gábor Szabó
- Grady Tate
- Cal Tjader
- Wendy and Bonnie
