= The In Sound (Gary McFarland album) =

The in Sound

Studio album by Gary McFarland
- Released: 1965
- Recorded: August 2–3, 1965
- Studio: Van Gelder Studio, Englewood Cliffs, New Jersey
- Genre: Jazz
- Length: 31:49
- Label: Verve – 8632
- Producer: Creed Taylor

Gary McFarland chronology
| Soft Samba (1963) | The in Sound (1965) | Soft Samba Strings (1965) |

Professional ratings
Review scores
| Source | Rating |
|---|---|
| AllMusic | 4.5/5 stars |

The in Sound is a 1965 album by jazz arranger and vibraphonist Gary McFarland.

== Reception ==
Douglas Payne reviewed the album for AllMusic writing that the album was "chock full of brief, enjoyable tunes that stick with you. Guitarist Gabor Szabo is a perfect partner and makes a memorable combination with McFarland's mellifluous vibraphone" and that it was a "more comfortable mix of McFarland's vocalese pop and jazz than the more successful Soft Samba".

The initial Billboard magazine review from December 4, 1965, commented that McFarland "knows that musicianship has to broaden to include humor and an awareness of the current mood to develop listener rapport. He does just that in this outstanding package that features some highly original and attractive material as well as some key sidemen who know what he's trying to say and help him say it".

== Track listing ==
1. "The Moment of Truth" (Piero Piccioni) – 4:07
2. "Bloop Bleep" (Frank Loesser) – 2:15
3. "The Hills of Verdugo" (Gary McFarland) – 3:52
4. "Over Easy" (McFarland) – 3:05
5. "Here I Am" (Hal David, Burt Bacharach) – 2:10
6. "Fried Bananas" (McFarland) – 4:30
7. "The Sting of the Bee" (Nino Oliviero, Bruno Nicolai, Alan Brandt) – 3:50
8. "Wine and Bread" (McFarland) – 3:10
9. "I Concentrate on You" (Cole Porter) – 2:50
10. "(I Can't Get No) Satisfaction" (Mick Jagger, Keith Richards) – 2:00

== Personnel ==
- Gary McFarland – arranger, vibraphone, vocals
- Bob Brookmeyer – trombone
- Sadao Watanabe – tenor saxophone, flute
- Spencer Sinatra – flute
- Gábor Szabó, Kenny Burrell – guitar
- Joe Venuto, Willie Rodriguez – percussion
- Richard Davis, Bob Bushnell – double bass
- Candido – bongos, congas
- Grady Tate, Sol Gubin – drums

Production

- Creed Taylor – producer
- Win Bruder – cover design
- Peter Shulman – cover painting
- Rudy Van Gelder – engineer
- Val Valentin – director of engineering
