= Gary McFarland =

American composer, vibraphonist and vocalist

- Born: Gary Ronald McFarland; October 23, 1933; Los Angeles, California, U.S.
- Died: November 2, 1971 (aged 38) New York City, U.S.
- Genres: Jazz
- Occupations: Musician, composer, arranger
- Instrument: Vibraphone
- Years active: 1963–1971
- Labels: Verve, Impulse!, Skye, Cobblestone, Buddah

Gary Ronald McFarland (October 23, 1933 – November 2, 1971) was an American composer, arranger, conductor, vibraphonist, and vocalist. He recorded for the jazz imprints Verve and Impulse! Records during the 1960s. DownBeat magazine said he made "one of the more significant contributors to orchestral jazz". A 2015 review of a McFarland DVD documentary called him "one of the busiest New York jazz arrangers of the 1960s". The review further stated that McFarland's "ascendance coincided with the rise of bossa nova, and McFarland was adept at translating the mercurial song form into orchestrations. He wrote some beautiful orchestral settings for great soloists, yet wasn't immune to commercial forces."

== Life ==
McFarland was born in Los Angeles, on October 23, 1933, but relocated at the age of 15 to Grants Pass, Oregon.

He attained a small following after working with jazz luminaries Bill Evans, Gerry Mulligan, Johnny Hodges, John Lewis, Stan Getz, Bob Brookmeyer, and Anita O'Day.

As well as his own albums and arrangements for other musicians he composed the scores to the films Eye of the Devil (1966) and Who Killed Mary What's 'Er Name? (1971). By the end of the 1960s, he was moving away from jazz towards an often wistful or melancholy style of instrumental pop, as well as producing the recordings of other artists on his Skye Records label (run in partnership with Norman Schwartz, Gábor Szabó and Cal Tjader, until its bankruptcy in 1970). He also produced and arranged the soft-rock album Genesis by singing sisters Wendy and Bonnie Flower.

McFarland was considering a move into writing and arranging for film and stage. However, at age 38, on November 2, 1971—the same day that he completed the Broadway album, To Live Another Summer; To Pass Another Winter—McFarland died in New York City at St. Vincent's Hospital from a lethal dose of liquid methadone that he had ingested at Bar 55 at 55 Christopher Street in Greenwich Village. It is not known whether he took the drug on purpose or someone spiked his drink; police did not investigate. McFarland had been married since 1963 to Gail Evelyn Frankel (1942–2007); they had a son, Milo (1964–2002), and a daughter, Kerry. Milo McFarland died of a heroin overdose at the same age as his father, 38.

== Discography ==
=== As leader ===
- 1961: The Jazz Version of "How to Succeed in Business without Really Trying" - Verve
- 1963: The Gary McFarland Orchestra: Special Guest Soloist: Bill Evans - Verve
- 1963: Point of Departure - Impulse!
- 1964: Soft Samba - Verve
- 1965: Jazz at The Penthouse (1965 club date released in 2014 ad CD with the DVD documentary This Is Gary McFarland!)
- 1965: Tijuana Jazz with Clark Terry - Impulse!
- 1965: The In Sound - Verve
- 1966: Eye of the Devil (soundtrack)
- 1966: Simpático with Gábor Szabó - Impulse!
- 1966: Profiles - Impulse!
- 1966: Soft Samba Strings - Verve
- 1967: The October Suite with Steve Kuhn - Impulse!
- 1968: Scorpio and Other Signs - Verve
- 1968: Does the Sun Really Shine on the Moon? - Skye
- 1969: America the Beautiful: An Account of Its Disappearance - Skye
- 1969: Slaves with Grady Tate - Skye
- 1969: Today - Skye
- 1971: Butterscotch Rum with Peter Smith - Buddah Records
- 1972: Requiem for Gary McFarland - Cobblestone Records

=== As producer/arranger ===
- 1961: All the Sad Young Men – Anita O'Day (Verve)
- 1961: Gloomy Sunday and Other Bright Moments – Bob Brookmeyer (Verve) – two compositions by McFarland
- 1962: Essence – John Lewis (Atlantic) – all compositions by McFarland
- 1962: Big Band Bossa Nova – Stan Getz (Verve)
- 1963: Gerry Mulligan '63 – Gerry Mulligan (Verve) – 3 compositions by McFarland
- 1963: The Groovy Sound of Music – Gary Burton (RCA)
- 1965: Latin Shadows – Shirley Scott (Impulse!)
- 1966: Waiting Game – Zoot Sims (Impulse!)
- 1969: Genesis – Wendy and Bonnie (Skye)
- 1969: Dreams – Gábor Szabó (Skye)
- 1969: 1969 – Gábor (Skye)
- 1969: Lena & Gabor – Lena Horne and Gábor (Skye)
- 1971: Steve Kuhn – Steve Kuhn (Buddah)

=== As sideman ===
- Bob Brookmeyer, Trombone Jazz Samba (Verve, 1962)
