= Gábor Szabó =

Hungarian-American guitarist (1936–1982)

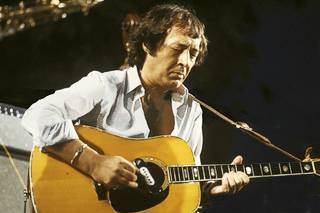

Background information
- Born: Gábor István Szabó; March 8, 1936; Budapest, Hungary
- Died: February 26, 1982 (aged 45) Budapest
- Genres: Jazz, pop, rock
- Occupations: Musician, composer
- Instrument: Guitar
- Years active: 1958–1982
- Labels: Impulse!, Skye, Blue Thumb, CTI

Gábor István Szabó (Hungarian pronunciation: [ˈgaːbor ˈiʃtvaːn ˈsɒboː]; March 8, 1936 – February 26, 1982) was a Hungarian-American guitarist whose style incorporated jazz, pop, rock, and Hungarian music.

== Early years ==
Szabó was born in Budapest, Hungary. He began playing guitar at the age of 14. In the aftermath of the Hungarian revolution of 1956, he moved to California, United States, and later attended the Berklee College of Music in Boston between 1958 and 1960.

In a 1974 interview, Szabo said he fell in love with jazz listening to Voice of America: "I had to listen to the jazz stations very quietly at night—if they were not jammed—because listening to music from the Western world was an offense against the government." When the Soviet Union militarily suppressed Hungarian insurgents, Szabo was twenty. He escaped to an Austrian refugee camp, later immigrating to San Bernardino. He found it challenging to break into jazz. He formed a trio with two other refugees. It failed; he worked as a janitor for a year. "By then I had saved enough money to study at the Berklee School of Music in Boston. And in 1958, I played at Newport (R.I.) with the International Band."

== Career ==
In 1961, Szabó became member of a quintet that was led by Chico Hamilton and included Charles Lloyd, playing what has been described as chamber jazz, with "a moderate avant-gardism." Szabó was influenced by the rock music of the 1960s, particularly the use of feedback. In 1965 he was in a jazz pop group led by Gary McFarland, then worked again with Lloyd in an energetic quartet with Ron Carter and Tony Williams. The song "Gypsy Queen" from Szabó's debut solo album Spellbinder became a hit for rock guitarist Carlos Santana as part of Black Magic Woman/Gypsy Queen. During the late 1960s, Szabó worked in a group with guitarist Jimmy Stewart. He started the label Skye Records with McFarland and Cal Tjader.

He orchestrated the Chico Hamilton score for the Roman Polanski film Repulsion in 1965.

Szabó continued to be drawn to more popular, commercial music in the 1970s. He performed often in California, combining elements of Gypsy and Indian music with jazz. In the 1970s he began to return occasionally to his home country of Hungary to perform, after more than twenty years absence.

== Personal life ==
In 1978, Szabo divorced his wife Alicia, with whom he had one son, Blaise. Szabo became involved with Marianne Almassey, a Hungarian model. They remained together until Szabo’s death in 1982.

In the late 1970s, Szabo sought drug treatment for a serious, long-standing heroin addiction dating back to his days with Chico Hamilton. He enrolled in Narconon, a treatment center run by the Church of Scientology. He signed with Vanguard Artists International, a Scientology-related firm led at the time by Chick Corea, in November 1978. By February 1980, Szabo had become alienated from Scientology, telling friends “they’re turning me into a zombie.” He accused the church and Artists International of physical abuse, misappropriating his money and mismanaging his career.

Szabo filed a $21 million lawsuit against the Church of Scientology, accusing the organization of embezzling his money, kidnapping him and forcing him to undergo a Scientology "Life Repair Course." Szabo accused the church of inducing him to sign with Artists International, alleging that the firm was inept and more concerned with using his name to win converts to Scientology. He said Artists International charged him 26 percent of his gross income, and embezzled at least $15,000 from him. The suit was settled the next year.

== Death ==
While visiting family in Budapest during the Christmas holiday, Szabó was admitted to the hospital and finally succumbed to the liver and kidney ailments from which he suffered as a consequence of his drug habit. He died on February 26, 1982, shortly before his 46th birthday. He was buried next to his mother in Farkasréti Cemetery.

== Discography ==
=== As leader ===
- Gypsy '66 (Impulse!, 1965 [rel. 1966])
- Spellbinder (Impulse!, 1966)
- Simpático (Impulse!, 1966) - with Gary McFarland
- Jazz Raga (Impulse!, 1966 [rel. 1967])
- The Sorcerer (Impulse!, 1967)
- More Sorcery (Impulse!, 1967 [rel. 1968])
- Light My Fire (Impulse!, 1967) - with Bob Thiele
- Wind, Sky and Diamonds (Impulse!, 1967)
- Bacchanal (Skye, 1968)
- Dreams (Skye, 1968)
- The Best Of (Impulse!, 1968)
- 1969 (Skye, 1969)
- Lena & Gabor (Skye, 1969 [rel. 1970]) - with Lena Horne
- His Great Hits (Impulse!, 1971)
- Magical Connection (Blue Thumb, 1970)
- High Contrast (Blue Thumb, 1971) - with Bobby Womack
- Small World (Four Leaf Clover [Sweden], 1972)
- Mizrab (CTI, 1972 [rel. 1973])
- Rambler (CTI, 1973 [rel. 1974])
- Gabor Szabo Live (Blue Thumb, 1974) - with Charles Lloyd; recorded 1972
- Macho (Salvation/CTI, 1975)
- Nightflight (Mercury, 1976)
- Faces (Mercury, 1977)
- Belsta River (Four Leaf Clover [Sweden], 1978)
- Femme Fatale (Pepita, 1981)
- The Szabo Equation: Jazz/Mysticism/Exotica (DCC Jazz, 1990)
- In Budapest (Moiras, 2008) - broadcast TV recordings from 1974
- In Budapest Again (Kept Alive Records, 2018) - broadcast TV recordings between 1978-1981
- Live in Cleveland 1976 (Ebalunga!!!, 2022)

=== As sideman ===
With Steve Allen

- Songs for Gentle People (Dunhill, 1967)

With Paul Desmond

- Skylark (CTI, 1973 [rel. 1974])

With Charles Earland

- The Great Pyramid (Mercury, 1976)

With Coke Escovedo

- Comin' at Ya! (Mercury, 1976)

With Chico Hamilton

- Drumfusion (Columbia, 1962)
- Transfusion (Studio West, 1962 [rel. 1990])
- Passin' Thru (Impulse!, 1962 [rel. 1963])
- A Different Journey (Reprise, 1963)
- Man from Two Worlds (Impulse!, 1963 [rel. 1964])
- Chic Chic Chico (Impulse!, 1965)
- El Chico (Impulse!, 1965)
- The Further Adventures of El Chico (Impulse!, 1966)

With Charles Lloyd

- Of Course, Of Course (Columbia, 1965)
- Nirvana (Columbia, 1965 [rel. 1968])
- Waves (A&M, 1972)
- Manhattan Stories [live] (Resonance, 2014) - 2CD set; recorded 1965

With Gary McFarland

- The In Sound (Verve, 1965)
- Profiles (Impulse!, 1966)
