= Bob Thiele =

American record producer and songwriter (1922–1996)

- Born: Robert Thiele; July 27, 1922; New York City, U.S.
- Died: January 30, 1996 (aged 73); New York City, U.S.
- Occupations: Record producer; record label founder
- Years active: 1936–1996
- Known for: Heading Impulse! Records, founding Flying Dutchman Records and Coral Records
- Spouse(s): Jane Harvey; Pauline Rivelli; Teresa Brewer; Monica Lewis (married 1945–47)
- Children: Bob Thiele Jr.
- Relatives: Owen Thiele (grandson)

Robert Thiele (July 27, 1922 – January 30, 1996) was an American record producer who worked on numerous classic jazz albums and record labels.

== Early life ==
Bob Thiele was born in Sheepshead Bay, Brooklyn, New York City, on July 27, 1922. He hosted a jazz radio show when he was 14. He also played clarinet and led a band in the New York area.

== Career ==
At 17, he founded the Signature label and recorded jazz musicians including Lester Young, Erroll Garner and, in 1943, Coleman Hawkins. Signature ceased activities in the late 1940s and Thiele joined American Decca in 1952, running its Coral subsidiary. His last wife was the singer Teresa Brewer, whom he met and produced while working for Coral in the 1950s, when he also produced Buddy Holly at the Texan's New York sessions at Bell Sound Studios, The Pythian Temple, and the posthumous album The Buddy Holly Story, and overdubbed singles.

Thiele was head of the Impulse! Records label from 1961 to 1969 after its originator Creed Taylor left to run Verve. While at Impulse, Thiele's best known association was with John Coltrane, but he also recorded such artists as Charles Mingus, Duke Ellington, Sonny Rollins, Archie Shepp, and Albert Ayler, among others. His most successful hit song, "What a Wonderful World", was co-written with George David Weiss and recorded by Louis Armstrong. According to Thiele's memoir, the recording session for the song was the scene of a major clash with ABC Records president Larry Newton, who had to be locked out of the studio after getting into a heated argument with Thiele over the song. "What a Wonderful World" was credited to George Douglas or Stanley Clayton. They are pseudonyms Thiele used, made from the names of his uncles, Stanley, Clayton, George, and Douglas. Thiele is credited as co-writer of a few other songs, none having anything remotely close to the success of "What a Wonderful World".

In the late 1960s, Thiele was often brought in to produce artists on the company's BluesWay label. He produced the albums that graduated B. B. King toward the mainstream, including Lucille (1967). He also produced BluesWay recordings by John Lee Hooker, T-Bone Walker, and others.

After seven years with ABC Records, the parent of Impulse!, Thiele formed his own company, Flying Dutchman Productions, in 1968. Thiele later formed his own record label, Flying Dutchman, which is now part of Sony Music Entertainment. Later in his career, Thiele formed the Doctor Jazz label in 1983; it appears to have ceased trading around 1989 after Columbia was bought by Sony. His Red Baron label was apparently an entirely separate operation. Founded around 1991, Red Baron releases included several projects by the Bob Thiele Collective and previously unissued recordings by Duke Ellington and Earl Hines, as well as reissues from other labels. In 1995, his memoir, What a Wonderful World, was published. Red Baron folded soon after Thiele died in 1996.

Thiele remained active in the music business until the end of his life, including the co-writing of the song "You", which was recorded by Bonnie Raitt and appeared on her 1994 album, Longing in Their Hearts.

== Death ==
Thiele died of kidney failure, according to a friend, at Roosevelt Hospital in Manhattan, New York City, on January 30, 1996.

== Discography ==
=== As leader ===
- 1967: Thoroughly Modern (ABC)
- 1968: Light My Fire with Gábor Szabó (Impulse!)
- 1969: Head Start (as 'Bob Thiele Emergency') (Flying Dutchman)
- 1975: I Saw Pinetop Spit Blood (Flying Dutchman)
- 1984: The Twenties Score Again (Columbia)

== Publications ==
- Thiele, Bob (1995). What a Wonderful World: A Lifetime of Recordings. Oxford University Press.
- Thiele, Bob; Weiss, George David (2014). What a Wonderful World. Illustrated by Tim Hopgood. Henry Holt and Company.
