= Hanna (surname) =

- Pronunciation: HAN-a
- Language: Irish and Scottish Gaelic; Aramaic

Origin
- Origin: Irish, Aramaic
- Region of origin: Scotland and Ireland; Middle East

Hanna or Hannah is an Irish and Scottish surname, ultimately of Irish origin from Ó hAnnaidh, or descendants of the lowland Clan Hannay.

Hanna (حنا) is also a common surname among Arab Christians in the Middle East, including Palestine, Lebanon, Egypt, Syria and Jordan. Hanna (ܚܲܢܵܐ) is also an Assyrian surname, a shortened form of Yohannan, the Aramaic equivalent of John.

Notable people with these surnames include:

== Hanna ==
- Alex Hanna (born 1961), English artist
- Arthur Dion Hanna (1928–2021), Governor-General of the Bahamas
- Billy Hanna (c. 1929–1975), Northern Irish loyalist and Ulster Volunteer Force leader
- Botros Fahim Hanna (born 1961), Egyptian Coptic Catholic bishop
- Charles Hanna (1889–1942), American politician from New York
- Ciara Hanna (born 1991), American actress and model
- Daniel D. Hanna (1923–1993), American politician from Wisconsin
- David Hanna (disambiguation), multiple people
- Delphine Hanna (1854–1941), American physical education professor
- Don Hanna (1887–1954), American politician from Nebraska
- Don Hanna Jr. (1912–2005), American politician from Nebraska, son of Don Hanna
- Edward A. Hanna (1922–2009), American politician from New York
- Edward Joseph Hanna (1860–1944), American bishop
- Gabbie Hanna (born 1991), American Internet personality
- George Hanna (disambiguation), multiple people
- Gertrud Hanna (1876–1944), German activist and politician
- Gila Hanna (born 1934), Canadian mathematics educator and philosopher of mathematics
- Jack Hanna (born 1947), American animal expert
- James Hanna (disambiguation), multiple people
- Jenn Hanna (born 1980), Canadian curler
- Jennie Hanna (1856–1924), American missionary worker and religious auxiliary founder
- Jim Hanna (loyalist) (c. 1947–1974), Northern Irish loyalist and Ulster Volunteer Force leader
- Jim Hanna (writer), American comedy writer
- John Hanna (disambiguation), multiple people
- Kate Hanna (born 1996), Australian field hockey player
- Kathleen Hanna (born 1968), American musician, activist and writer
- Kris Hanna (born 1962), South Australian lawyer, politician, mayor and Unitarian minister
- Lucy Hanna, American photographer
- Marjorie Hanna, Canadian ballplayer, All-American Girls Professional Baseball League
- Mark Hanna (disambiguation), multiple people
- Merrick Hanna (born 2005), American dancer
- Ray Hanna (1928–2005), New Zealand-born RAF officer, civilian pilot and 'warbird' collector
- Richard Hanna (New York politician) (1951–2020), American politician from New York
- Roland Hanna (1932–2002), American jazz pianist
- Stanley S. Hanna (1920–2012), American physicist
- Stephen Hanna, New York City Ballet principal dancer
- Steve Hanna (born 1958), Bahamian triple jumper
- Vincent Hanna (1939–1997), Northern Irish television journalist
- William Hanna (disambiguation), multiple people

- William Hanna (1910–2001) US animator with Joseph Barbera

== Hannah ==
- Alan Hannah (born 1971), Scottish curler and coach
- Andrew Hannah (1864–1940), Scottish footballer
- Barbara Hannah (1891–1982), English psychologist
- Barry Hannah (1942–2010), American author
- Bob Hannah (born 1956), American motorcycle racer
- Bob Hannah (baseball), American college baseball coach
- Bobby Hannah, Scottish footballer
- Brook Hannah (1874–1961), Australian rules footballer and missionary
- Bryony Hannah (born 1984), British actress
- Charley Hannah (born 1955), American football player
- Colin Hannah (1914–1978), Australian military pilot and politician
- Daryl Hannah (born 1960), American actress
- David Hannah (born 1973), Scottish (association) football player
- David Hannah (footballer, born 1867) of Ireland
- Dorita Hannah, New Zealand architect
- George Hannah (disambiguation), multiple people
- Gerry Hannah, Canadian musician
- Izabela Hannah, dancer
- Jack Hannah (1913–1994), American director of animated shorts
- John Hannah (disambiguation), multiple people
- Lee Hannah, conservation ecologist
- Liz Hannah (born 1985), American screenwriter and producer
- Marc Hannah (born 1956), American computer scientist
- Michael Hannah (born 1983), Australian mountain biker
- Muriel Hannah (died 1969), Alaskan artist
- Ross Hannah (born 1986), English footballer
- Sophie Hannah, British writer
- Tracey Hannah (born 1988), Australian mountain biker
- Truck Hannah (1889–1982), American baseball player

=== Fictional characters ===
- Curtis Hannah, soap opera character in Shortland Street
- Jack Hannah (Shortland Street), soap opera character
- Mark Hanna, from the film The Wolf of Wall Street, played by Matthew McConaughey
- Vincent Hanna, from the film Heat, played by Al Pacino

== Hannahs ==
- Dusty Hannahs (born 1993), American basketball player in the Israeli Basketball Premier League

== See also ==
- Barbara Blake Hannah (born 1941), Jamaican author and journalist
- Hanna (Arabic name)
