= W. C. Handy Jazz All-Stars =

- Also known as: W. C. Handy Festival All-Stars
- Origin: Florence, Alabama, United States
- Genres: Jazz

The W. C. Handy Jazz All-Stars (also known as the W. C. Handy Festival All-Stars) is a group of jazz musicians who play annually at the W. C. Handy Music Festival in Florence, Alabama. During the last week of July each year, these musicians travel from all over the United States to gather in Florence and perform in various combinations. In addition to performing jazz, members of the W. C. Handy Jazz All-Stars serve as the resident faculty of the W. C. Handy Jazz Camp, also teaching the "A B Cs of Jazz, Blues and Beyond".

== Roster of musicians ==
Through the years, the W. C. Handy Music Festival has featured numerous top quality jazz musicians, many of which are listed below.

Pianists:

- Laszlo Gardony – Pianist, residing in Boston, Massachusetts. Professor of Piano at Berklee College of Music.
- Gary Motley - Pianist, Atlanta, Georgia.
- Johnny O'Neal - Pianist & vocalist, Detroit, Michigan.
- Ray Reach – Pianist & vocalist, Director of Student Jazz Programs for the Alabama Jazz Hall of Fame, Birmingham, Alabama.
- Robert Redd - Pianist, brother of Chuck Redd, Takoma Park, Maryland.
- Mike Wofford – Pianist, residing in Los Angeles, California.

Guitarists:

- Mel Deal - Guitarist, Nashville, Tennessee.
- Eric Essix - Guitarist, Birmingham, Alabama.
- Mundell Lowe – Film composer and guitarist with the André Previn Trio, San Diego, California.
- Lloyd Wells - Guitarist, Nashville, Tennessee.
- Jack Pearson - Guitarist, former member of the Allman Brothers Band, residing in Nashville, Tennessee.
- Tom Wolfe – Guitarist, Director of Jazz Studies at the University of Alabama, Tuscaloosa, Alabama.

Drummers and percussionists:

- Bill Goodwin – Drummer with Gary Burton and Phil Woods, New Jersey.
- Beth Gottlieb - Percussionist (wife of Danny Gottlieb), residing in Nashville, Tennessee.
- Danny Gottlieb - Drummer, residing in Nashville, Tennessee.
- Sonny Harris – Drummer, Birmingham, Alabama.
- Chuck Redd - Vibraphonist & drummer, residing in Takoma Park, Maryland.
- Mike Shepherd – Percussionist, one of the founders of the Handy Festival, Minnesota.

Bassists:

- Cleveland Eaton - Bassist, Birmingham, Alabama.
- Jim Ferguson - Bass professor at Middle Tennessee State University, residing in Nashville, Tennessee
- Tim Goodwin – Bassist, Professor of Jazz Studies at the University of Memphis.
- Ike Harris – Bassist, tours with Crystal Gayle, Nashville, Tennessee.
- Neal Starkey – Bassist, residing in Atlanta, Georgia.

Wind players:

- Holly Hofmann – Flutist, residing in Los Angeles, California.
- Gary Lamb – Trumpeter & vocalist.
- Howard Lamb – Trombonist & Director of the Memphis Jazz Orchestra.
- Kelley O'Neal - Saxophonist, former band member with Take 6, residing in Atlanta, Georgia.
- Ken Watters – Trumpeter, residing in Atlanta, Georgia.
- Gary Wheat - Saxophonist, residing in Birmingham, Alabama.
- Scott Silberth - Saxophonist, residing in Washington, DC.
