= W. C. Handy Jazz Camp =

The W. C. Handy Jazz Camp is sponsored jointly by the W. C. Handy Music Festival and the University of North Alabama (UNA), and is held annually in Florence, Alabama. Every year, the camp features an accomplished faculty, all members of the W. C. Handy Jazz All-Stars.

== Curriculum ==
"The camp consists of four days of intensive music study at UNA", said Nancy Gonce, who assisted professional jazz musician Mike Shepherd and former UNA band director Dr. Edd Jones in establishing the camp as an educational extension of the area's annual W. C. Handy Music Festival. The founders set up the curriculum using state jazz honor-band criteria to help prepare students for the state level.

At the camp, young music students learn jazz through the study of music theory and improvisational concepts. Ensemble rehearsals are provided, as well as private lessons from professional musicians. Camp students, along with the accomplished musicians who make up the faculty, perform each year during the W. C. Handy Music Festival, which takes place throughout the Florence-Sheffield-Muscle Shoals area during the last week of July.

"Many of the students are in [middle or] high school jazz bands", Gonce said. "Others don't have jazz bands at their schools, but want to learn more about the musical technique."

== 2006 faculty ==
The 2006 faculty featured a variety of professional musicians, including Ken Watters (trumpet), Howard Lamb (trombone), Rick Bell (saxophone), Tim Goodwin (bass), Mike Shepherd (drums), Ray Reach (piano – director of Student Jazz Programs at the Alabama Jazz Hall of Fame) and Mel Deal (guitar). Hosts Dr. Edd Jones and Lloyd Jones (current director UNA's band program) and camp directors Terry Ownby, band director for Muscle Shoals Middle School, and James Ed Champion, former band director for Bradshaw High School, organized the 2006 camp.

== 2007 faculty ==
The 2007 faculty included Ken Watters (trumpet), Howard Lamb (trombone), Tim Goodwin (bass), Chuck Redd (drums and vibraphone) and Ray Reach (piano – director of Student Jazz Programs at the Alabama Jazz Hall of Fame).

== Closing concert ==
The W. C. Handy Music Camp concludes each year with a concert in the UNA Band Room, featuring camp faculty and students. Following this, participating music students perform as the "Music Camp All-Stars" during the W. C. Handy Music Festival.
