= Neal Starkey =

American jazz bassist

Neal Starkey is an American jazz bassist residing in Atlanta, Georgia. He has had a long and varied career, performing with many of the most notable names in jazz, including Kenny Barron, Eddie Harris, Sonny Stitt, Duke Pearson, Al Cohn, Charlie Rouse, Barney Kessel, Chuck Mangione and many others. He is a regular featured performer at the W. C. Handy Music Festival, and a member of the W. C. Handy Jazz All-Stars. Originally from New York, he has made Atlanta his home for the past 25 years.

Starkey has recorded with Herbie Hancock, Tony Williams and Freddie Hubbard with the CBS Jazz All-Stars, and has served as bass instructor in the jazz program at Georgia State University. He has also had extensive studio recording experience and is one of the most in-demand bassists in the Southeastern region, often working with notable Southeastern regional jazz musicians such as Rick Bell (saxophone), Ken Watters (trumpet), Bill Anschell (piano), Gary Motley (piano) and Ray Reach (piano and vocal).

Neal appeared on an episode of the popular TV show "In the Heat of the Night" as bassist for Bobby Short: "Chez and the Grand Lady" (1994).

== Partial discography ==
- Bill Anschell - When Cooler Heads Prevail - Summit Records #DCD 311. Personnel: Bill Anschell (Pianist, composer, arranger, producer), Rodney Jordan (Bass), Neal Starkey (Bass), Woody Williams (Drumset, bata, bongo, cajon, cowbell, kono, pandeiro, rattle, shaker, tan-tan). Recorded August 27, 2000 and October 28, 2000
- Bill Anschell - A Different Note All Together - Accurate Records # AC-5030, 1998. Personnel: Bill Anschell (Pianist, composer, arranger, producer), Neal Starkey (Bass), Woody Williams (Drums, percussion, scream), Scott Sawyer (Guitar), Rick Bell (Sax). Recorded July 14–16, 1997
- Bill Anschell - Rhythm Changes - Consolidated Artists Productions # CAP 910. Personnel: Bill Anschell (Pianist, composer, arranger, producer), Neal Starkey (Bass), Woody Williams (Drums), Rick Bell (Sax), Eddie Davis (Trumpet), Bob Lewis (Trombone), Brian Lopes (Sax). Recorded October and November, 1994
- E.J. Hughes - Something to Say - Blue Canoe Records. Personnel: E.J. Hughes (tenor sax), Kenny Banks (piano), Neal Starkey (bass), Woody Williams (drums), Dave Frackenpohl (guitar). Release Date: 25 October 2005.
- Ted Howe - Ellington - Summit Records (2005)
- Toni Braxton - Snowflakes - Arista Records (Germany). Neal Starkey (bass). Release Date: October 22, 2001
- Gary Motley - Where Land Meets Sky (2006) is a unique selection of jazz standards and sacred melodies taken from the ROA Jazz Vespers Services. The recording features Motley with vocalist Veronica Motley, Gordon Vernick, trumpet, EJ Hughes, saxophone, Neal Starkey, bass, Clay Hulet, drums and special guest Victor Goines, saxophone.
