= Hanna (Arabic name) =

- Pronunciation: HAN-a
- Language: Arabic

Origin
- Origin: Syriac / Aramaic
- Region of origin: Israel, Lebanon, Syria and Egypt)

Hanna, Henna, or Hana is an Arabic name (حنّا), common particularly among Arab Christians in Palestine, Lebanon, Syria and Egypt, deriving from the Syriac/Aramaic name for the Apostle John. In turn, the Syriac name is borrowed from Hebrew יוֹחָנָן (Yoḥānān) meaning God has gifted [the child].

Notable people with the name include:

== Given name ==
=== Hanna ===
- Hanna Abu-Hanna (1928–2022), Palestinian poet, writer and researcher
- Hanna Mikhail, Palestinian scholar and Fatah member
- Hanna Nasser (1936–2015), Palestinian politician
- Hanna Nasser (academic), Palestinian academic and political figure
- Hanna Netterberg (born 1983), Swedish politician
- Hanna Siniora (born 1937), Palestinian publisher and politician

=== Hana ===
- Hana Elhebshi, Libyan activist
- Hana Hajjar, Saudi cartoonist
- Hana Majaj (born 1982), Jordanian swimmer
- Hana Mareghni (born 1989), Tunisian judo practitioner
- Hana Nasser (born 1991), Israeli football player
- Hana Shiha (born 1985), Egyptian actress
- Hana Sweid (born 1955), Israeli Arab politician

== Middle name ==
- Stephan Hanna Stephan (1894–1949), a Christian Arab Palestinian writer

== Surname ==
- Edward A. Hanna (1922–2009), American businessman and politician
- Gabbie Hanna (born 1991), American internet personality, singer-songwriter, author, actress and YouTuber
- George Hanna (basketball) (1928–2019), Iraqi-American basketball player and professor
- Jack Hanna (born 1947), American zookeeper
- John Hanna (ice hockey) (1935–2005), Canadian hockey player
- Jumana Hanna (born c. 1962), member of former prominent Iraqi family
- Lisa Hanna (born 1975), Jamaican politician and beauty queen, winner of the Miss World title in 1993
- Mil Hanna (born 1966), Lebanese-born Australian rules footballer
- Richard L. Hanna (1951–2020), American businessman and politician
- Tariq Hanna, Nigerian-American chef
- Theodosios (Hanna) of Sebastia (born 1965), Palestinian Archbishop

== See also ==
- Abu Hanna
- Hana (given name)
- Hanna (surname)
- Hannah (name)
