= Culture of Oregon =

The culture of Oregon has had a diverse and distinct character from before European settlement until the modern day. Some 80 Native American tribes were living in Oregon before the establishment of European American settlements and ultimately a widespread displacement of the local indigenous tribes. Trappers and traders were the harbingers of the coming migration of Europeans. Many of these settlers traveled along the nationally renowned Oregon Trail, with estimates of around 53,000 using the trail between 1840 and 1850. Much has been written about Oregon's founding as a "racist white utopia," as many original laws were passed to keep Black Americans out of the state. Indeed, in 2019 the population was still 87% white and 2% Black.

World War I stimulated the shipyards and timber trades in Oregon, especially Portland, which is still an integral part of the Northwest economy. In the 1930s, New Deal programs such as the Works Projects Administration and the Civilian Conservation Corps built many projects around the state, including Timberline Lodge on Mt. Hood. Hydroelectric dams and roads were also built at this time, improving the quality of life of many Oregonians. This encouraged settlement, and irrigation water from the Columbia River aided agricultural development. The Bonneville Dam was a plentiful and cheap source of power, which stimulated the development of industries such as aluminum plants during World War II. Food production, shipbuilding and the lumber were also greatly enhanced by the needs of the nation during World War II.

In recent years, electronics and tourism have broadened its economic base. Tourism is now the state's third largest source of revenue, after lumber and agriculture. In agriculture, Oregon is one of the top producers in such crops as greenhouse and nursery products, Christmas trees, grass seed, peppermint, blackberries and filberts. Other crops produced in Oregon are wheat, potatoes, pears, onions, snap beans and sweet corn. The products of Oregon wineries are nationally known, especially the chardonnay and pinot noir from Yamhill and Washington counties. The diversity of berries produced there (strawberries, blueberries, raspberries and many other varieties of cane berries) make summer an eagerly awaited season in Oregon.

Today, there are statewide groups, such as the Oregon Cultural Trust, that raise new funds to invest in Oregon's arts, humanities and heritage. The annual Oregon State Fair is a major event which has been held since 1861. Farm, garden and floral competitions are held.

== Native American culture in Oregon ==
Oregon has a diverse Indigenous culture with approximately 80 Native American tribes living in Oregon before the establishment of European pioneer settlements. There are seven reservations in Oregon that belong to seven of the nine federally recognized Oregon tribes:

- Burns Paiute Indian Colony, of the Burns Paiute Tribe: 13,738 acres (55.60 km^{2}) in Harney County
- Coos, Lower Umpqua and Siuslaw Reservation, of Confederated Tribes of Coos, Lower Umpqua and Siuslaw Indians is less than 10 acres (40,000 m2)
- Coquille Reservation includes 5,400 acres (22 km^{2}) of land held in trust for the Coquille Tribe in and around Coos Bay, Oregon.
- Grand Ronde Community, of the Confederated Tribes of the Grand Ronde Community of Oregon: 11,040 acres (44.7 km^{2}), mostly in Yamhill County, with the rest in Polk County.
- Siletz Reservation, of the Confederated Tribes of Siletz: 4,204 acres (17.01 km^{2}), 3,666 acres (14.84 km^{2}) of which is in Lincoln County.
- Umatilla Reservation, of the Confederated Tribes of the Umatilla Indian Reservation: 172,882 acres (699.63 km^{2}), mostly in Umatilla County, with the rest in Union County.
- Warm Springs Reservation, of the Confederated Tribes of Warm Springs: 641,118 acres (2,594.51 km^{2}), mostly in Wasco County and Jefferson County, with parts in Clackamas, Marion, and Linn counties.

== Arts ==
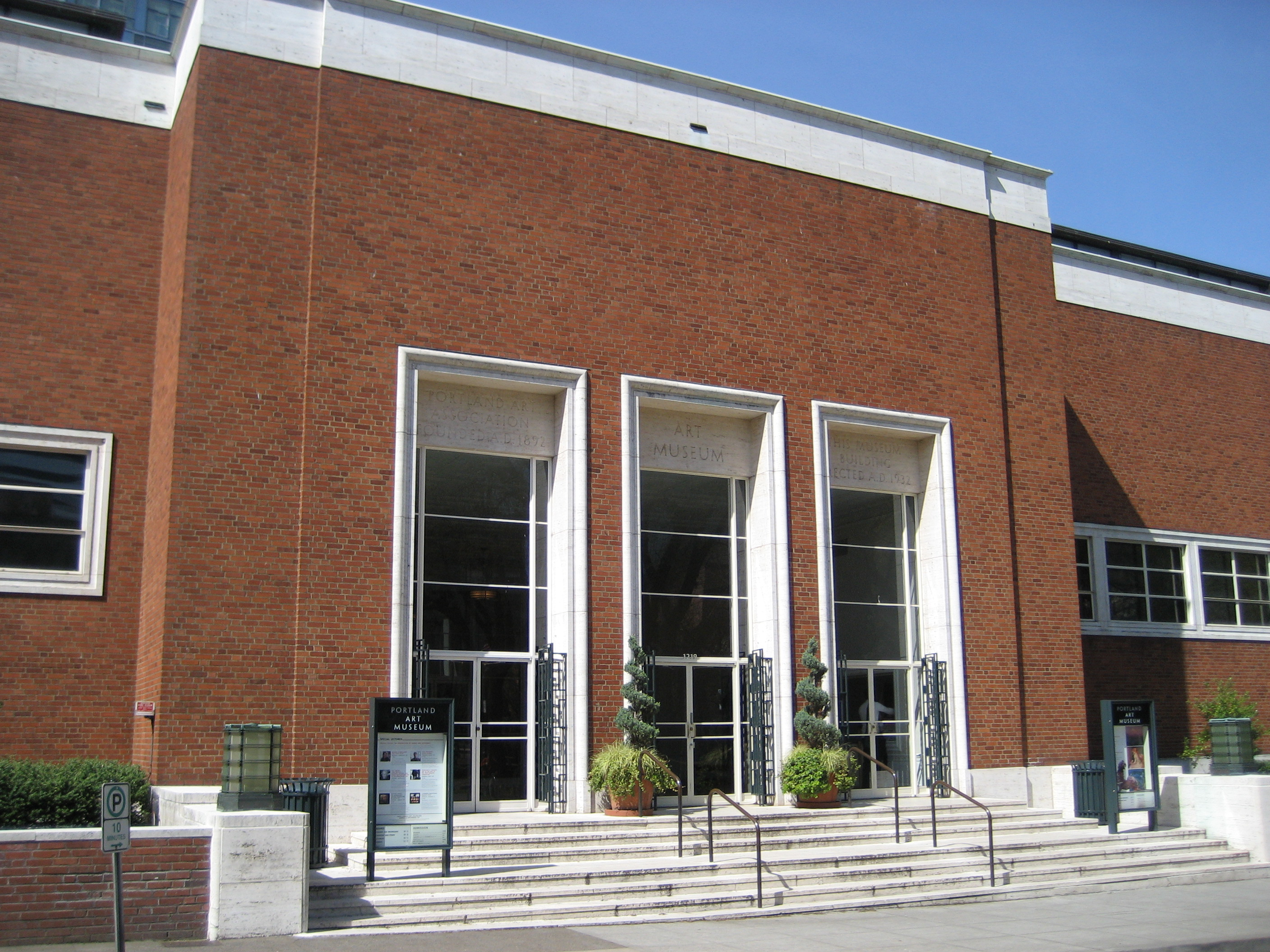
Portland Art Museum

=== Museums ===
The Jordan Schnitzer Museum on the University of Oregon campus has been a part of Oregon's culture since it opened on June 10, 1933. The museum was built to house the Murray Warner Collection of Oriental Art—more than 3,000 objects given to the university by Gertrude Bass Warner, the museum's first director and "curator for life." It is accredited by the American Alliance of Museums. Another major art museum in Oregon is the Portland Art Museum (PAM). Founded in late 1892, the Portland Art Museum is the seventh oldest museum in the United States and the oldest in the Pacific Northwest. The museum is internationally recognized for its permanent collection and ambitious special exhibitions, drawn from the museum's holdings and the world's finest public and private collections. With a membership of over 23,000 households and serving more than 350,000 visitors annually, the museum is a premier venue for education in the visual arts.

=== Performing arts ===
Another major interest in Oregon is the performing arts. The most notable event for the performing arts in Oregon is the Oregon Shakespeare Festival, a cultural event that has been running in Ashland, Oregon since 1935. The Portland Opera is another walk of the performing arts culture of Oregon and was the world premiere location for both Bernard Herrmann's Wuthering Heights and Christopher Drobny's Lucy's Lapses. Shanghaied in Astoria is a musical melodrama that is performed by the Astor Street Opry Company every summer in Astoria since 1984.

== Music ==
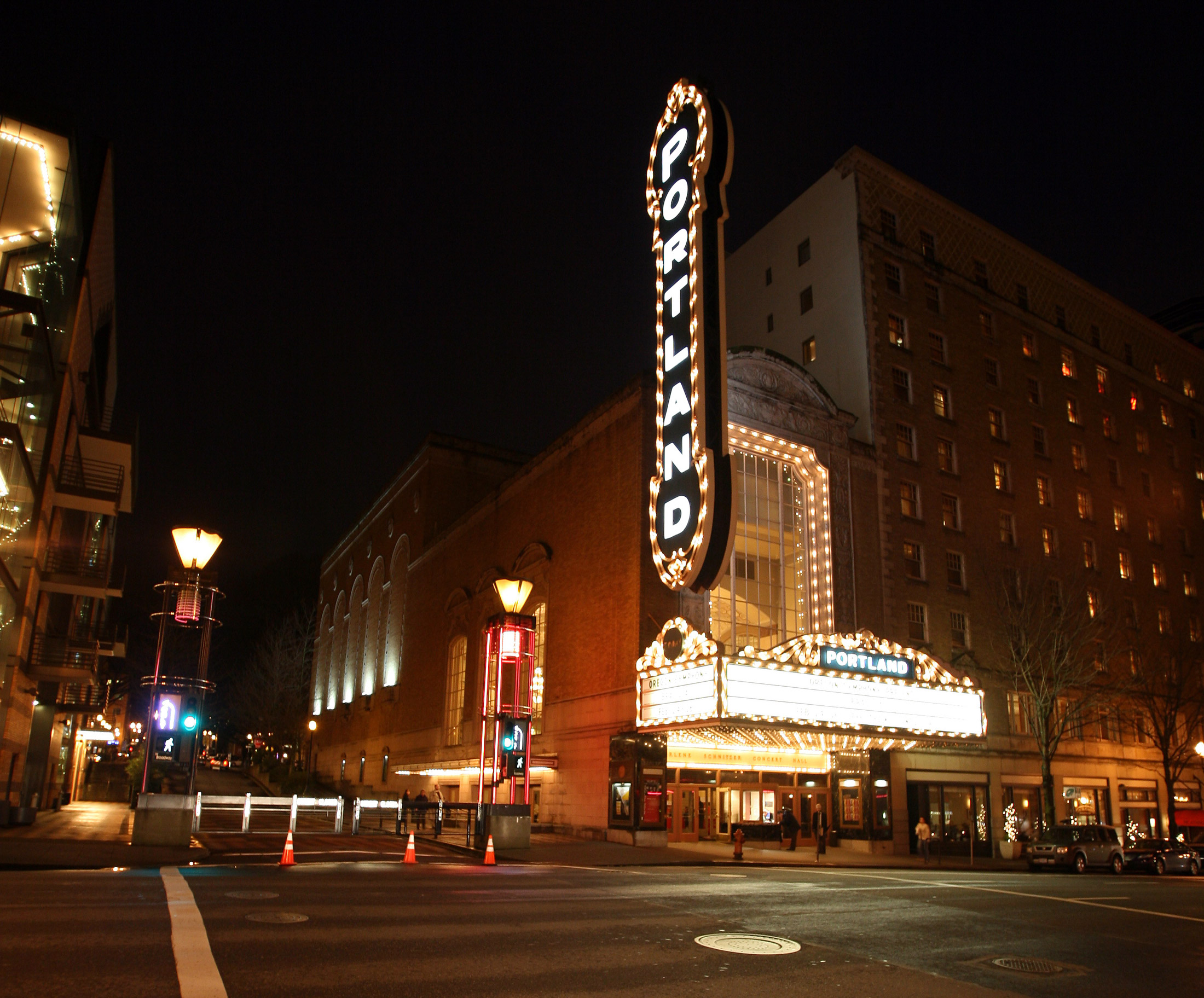
Schnitzer Hall

The Oregon Symphony currently ranks among the largest orchestras in the nation and as one of the largest arts organizations in the Northwest. Their special event concerts and presentations to an audiences totaling around 320,000 annually.

One major outlet of music in Oregon is the Oregon Festival of American Music. The Oregon Festival of American Music is an eclectic, thematically based two-week summer music festival that has been held annually in Eugene since 1992 and has been produced by The John G. Shedd Institute for the Arts. Other music festivals in Oregon include the Waterfront Blues Festival in Portland, the Oregon Bach Festival in Eugene, and the Mt. Hood Jazz Festival in Gresham.

Portland is known for its strong indie music scene, and has produced numerous indie musicians such as The Decemberists, Gossip, The Dandy Warhols, M. Ward, Logan Lynn, Storm Large, Pink Martini, Elliott Smith, and Floater. Other notable musicians have relocated to Portland from other areas, including Modest Mouse, Sleater-Kinney, The Shins, Spoon, former Pavement leader Stephen Malkmus, singer-songwriter Patterson Hood, and former R.E.M. guitarist Peter Buck.

Several songs mention or reference the state, including "Eugene, Oregon" by Dolly Parton and "Lumberjack" by Johnny Cash. Carrie & Lowell, a concept album by Sufjan Stevens, mentions several locations in the state, including Eugene, Roseburg, Cottage Grove, Sea Lion Caves, and John Day Fossil Beds National Monument.

== Literature ==
=== Authors ===
The non-profit arts and culture sector of the economic generates more than $680 million annually for Oregon. The state government alongside the non-profit Literary Arts sponsors the Oregon Book Awards, which honors literary excellence in writing and publishing since the 1980s. These factors, alongside a community of independent booksellers such as Powell's Books, has attracted many writers to the area, including Tom Spanbauer (who has been called "the Godfather of Portland's Writing Scene"), Omar El Akkad, Jean Auel, David Biespiel, Matthew Dickman, Ian Doescher, Dorianne Laux, Elena Passarello, Matthew Minicucci, Karen Russell, Kim Stafford, Cheryl Strayed, Mary Szybist, and Lidia Yuknavitch, among others.

Children's author Beverly Cleary was born in McMinnville, Oregon in 1916, and attended Grant High School, in northeast Portland. Although Cleary and her husband would eventually settle in Carmel-by-the-Sea, California, the author continued to write stories set in Portland, and used many references to the city in them. Henry Huggins, for instance, lived on Klickitat Street, while Ramona Quimby was named for Quimby Street. In return, in 1995 fans of the author successfully raised funds to commemorate her work with the Beverly Cleary Sculpture Garden in Grant Park, which features many of her most famous characters.

Ken Kesey, best known for his novels One Flew Over the Cuckoo's Nest (later adapted into an Academy Award-winning film starring Jack Nicholson) and Sometimes a Great Notion, lived in Oregon for most of his life. Originally from Colorado, Kesey moved to Eugene in 1957 to attend the University of Oregon. After spending six months incarcerated for marijuana possession in Redwood City, California, he settled permanently in Pleasant Hill, Oregon, with his family 1966, where he resided until his death in 2001. In 2017, the city of Eugene renamed the southeast corner of Broadway and Willamette Street Kesey Square in honor of the author.

Speculative fiction author Ursula K. Le Guin lived in northwest Portland from 1958 until her death in 2018, having moved to the city after her husband, the historian Charles Le Guin, was hired as an instructor at Portland State University. The Lathe of Heaven, one of LeGuin's most renowned novels, is set in a future Portland.

Fight Club author Chuck Palahniuk was born in the neighboring state of Washington, moving to Oregon in the early 1980s to attend the University of Oregon. In interviews, he has stated that his inspiration for his first novel came in part from working as a diesel mechanic for the truck manufacturer Freightliner, a job which the author held from age 22 to 35. In 2003, he published an alternative travelogue of the city titled Fugitives and Refugees: A Walk in Portland, Oregon.

Author Steve Perry, writer of a number of movie adaptations, Batman cartoons, Conan novels, Star Wars novels, and a series called "The Man Who Never Missed" and numerous other projects and short stories. He enjoys teasing his editors by leaving situation references in his books from other works he has written. Scattered through a number of his works are the names from Portland and other locations throughout the Pacific Northwest.

Other authors from Oregon include Virginia Euwer Wolff, Daniel H. Wilson, John Gallaher, Walt Curtis, Phillip Margolin and Collen Houck.

== Film ==
=== Filmmakers ===
Seven and Zodiac director David Fincher graduated from Ashland High School. Director Brad Bird graduated from Corvallis High School. Simpsons creator and cartoonist Matt Groening graduated from Lincoln High School. Director Todd Haynes lives in Oregon.

Director Gus Van Sant has achieved commercial and critical acclaim for his films, including My Own Private Idaho, Drugstore Cowboy, Good Will Hunting (which earned Van Sant a best director Oscar nomination) and Elephant (which won the Palme d'Or and a best director award at the Cannes Film Festival).

Stop motion studio Will Vinton Studios was based in Portland, Oregon. Its work included the feature film Return to Oz, the California Raisins television commercials of the 1980s, and Eddie Murphy's television show The PJs. Will Vinton Studios' successor Laika, LLC, known for films such as Coraline, ParaNorman, and Kubo and the Two Strings, is also based in Oregon, in the Hillsboro area.

=== Films ===
Oregon has provided the setting for hundreds of films, including The Goonies, Stand By Me, One Flew Over the Cuckoo's Nest, and Mr. Holland's Opus. In addition, Oregon is a popular filming location, owing in part to the state's geographic diversity and natural beauty. Timberline Lodge on Mount Hood was used for exterior shots of the fictional Overlook Hotel in The Shining. Animal House was filmed on the University of Oregon campus in Eugene, and in the nearby town of Cottage Grove. Twilight, while set in Forks, Washington, was filmed in Portland and St. Helens.

The Oregon Film Museum in Astoria showcases several films made in Oregon. It occupies the old Clatsop County Jail, which was used in the opening scene of The Goonies.

== Cuisine ==
Oregon produces many fruits and berries, including pears, blueberries, huckleberries, and blackberries. Marionberries, a cultivar of blackberries, were developed by the USDA ARS breeding program in cooperation with Oregon State University, and account for over half of all blackberries produced in Oregon. Oregon is also the nation's leading producer of hazelnuts.

Seafood, such as Dungeness crab, is also common.

Tater tots were developed by the frozen food company Ore-Ida in Ontario, Oregon.

Voodoo Doughnut is a doughnut company based in Portland, known for its unusual ingredients such as breakfast cereal, bacon, and peanut butter. Portland is also home to the ice cream company Salt & Straw, known for its exotic flavors such as Bone Marrow with Bourbon Smoked Cherries and Arbequina Olive Oil. Tillamook, Oregon is home to the Tillamook County Creamery Association, the 48th largest dairy manufacturer in North America. The company's Medium Cheddar Cheese won the gold medal in the 2010 World Cheese Championship Cheese Contest.

== National Landmarks ==
=== National Natural Landmarks ===
Oregon has many natural landmarks, the most famous of those landmarks is Crater Lake and is the main feature of Crater Lake National Park and famous for its deep blue color and water clarity. The lake partly fills a nearly 2,148-foot (655 m) deep caldera that was formed around 7,700 (± 150) years ago by the collapse of the volcano Mount Mazama. Crater Lake is also the deepest lake in the U.S.A..

Other major natural landmarks are Crown Point, a promontory on the Columbia River Gorge, Fort Rock State Monument a volcanic landmark called a tuff ring, John Day Fossil Beds a 14,000-acre (5,700 ha) park that is world-renowned for its well preserved, remarkably complete record of fossil plants and animals, along with other natural wonders.

=== National Historic Landmarks ===
Oregon has a surplus of historic landmarks spread across the state. From historic dams, like the Bonneville Dam that spans the Columbia River to the Deady and Villard Halls which are the two oldest buildings on the campus of the University of Oregon. Along with Historic Places all over the state such as the Monteith Historic District in Albany

== See also ==
- List of libraries in Oregon
