= Senator Hanna =

Senator Hanna may refer to:

== Members of the United States Senate ==
- Mark Hanna (1837–1904), U.S. Senator from Ohio
- Robert Hanna (1786–1858), U.S. Senator from Indiana

== United States state senate members ==
- Deanna Hanna (born 1943), Colorado State Senate
- Don Hanna (1887–1954), Nebraska State Senate, father of Don Hanna Jr.
- Don Hanna Jr. (1912–2005), Nebraska State Senate, son of Don Hanna
- James Hanna (judge) (1816–1872), Indiana State Senate
