= Elections in Cocos (Keeling) Islands =

The British Empire annexed the islands in 1857. On 6 April 1984, a referendum was held, giving residents three choices: to become independent, to enter into free association with Australia or to integrate into Australia. All registered voters voted, with 229 of 261 (87.7%) choosing integration. The Australian external territory of Cocos (Keeling) Islands regularly holds elections on the federal and local level.

== Federal elections ==
The Cocos (Keelings) Islands are part of the Northern Territory's Division of Lingiari and are represented by Northern Territory members in the Australian House of Representatives and the Australian Senate.

== Local elections ==
The unicameral Council of the Shire of Cocos (Keeling) Islands is the local government body, under the Local Government Act 1995. It is made up of seven councillors who elect one of their number to be the president. They serve for four years or two years, with elections being held for three or four members at a time every two years in October. The first election took place in May 1993.

=== 2019 ===
Three council seats were up for election on 19 October 2019.

Candidate	Votes	%
Jamil Ibram	150	30.90%
Mazlan Hamiril	127	26.20%
Seriwati Iku	123	25.40%
Kenneth Zakaria Lakina	85	17.50%
Total votes	485	100.00%

=== 2021 ===
Four councillors were elected on 16 October 2021 for four-year terms.

Candidate	Votes	%
Aindil Minkom	138	25.51%
Tony Lacy	123	22.74%
Ayesha Young	122	22.55%
Helen Liu	88	16.27%
Shane Charlston	70	12.94%
Total votes	541	100.00%

=== 2023 (special) ===
A special council election was held on 25 February 2023, with Signa Knight running unopposed.

=== 2023 (regular) ===
Four councillors were elected for four-year terms on a ranked-choice ballot on 21 October 2023. As two candidates were tied for the last seat, the winner was selected by drawing of lots.

Candidate	First preference			Surplus			Surplus			Surplus			Exclusion	
Isa Minkom	66	44.00%	–35	31	21.09%	–	31	21.68%	–	31	22.14%	–	31	22.62%
Azah Badlu	49	32.67%	–	49	33.33%	–18	31	21.68%	–	31	22.14%	–	31	22.62%
Osman Sloan	13	8.67%	+23	36	24.49%	–	36	25.18%	–5	31	22.14%	–	31	22.62%
Signa Knight	8	5.33%	+3	11	7.48%	+5	16	11.19%	+1	17	12.14%	+5	22	16.06%
Chloe Sykes	9	6.00%	+5	14	9.52%	+3	17	11.89%	+1	18	12.86%	+4	22	16.06%
Lofty Raptikan	5	3.33%	+1	6	4.08%	+6	12	8.39%	–	12	8.57%	–12	Excl.	
Active ballots	150	100.00%	–3	147	98.00%	–4	143	95.33%	–3	140	93.33%	–3	137	91.33%
Exhausted, lost fractions	0	0.00%	+3	3	2.00%	+4	7	4.67%	+3	10	6.67%	+3	13	8.67%
Valid ballots													150	93.17%
Invalid or blank ballots													11	6.83%
Total													161	100.00%

=== 2025 ===
Four candidates—Levi Fowler, Signa Knight, Anthony Lacey and Ayesha Young—ran unopposed for four seats.

== See also ==
- Electoral results for the Division of Lingiari
