= The Island of Dr. Trombone =

Studio album by Harry Watters
- Released: 2000
- Genre: Jazz
- Length: 42:18
- Label: Summit Records

Professional ratings
Review scores
Source	Rating
AllMusic	4.5/5 stars

The Island of Dr. Trombone is a 2000 jazz album by trombonist Harry Watters. Regarding the tropical feel of the album, Watters said that “recording the disc was a therapeutic way of getting through the harshest weeks of sub-freezing temperatures.” The album features several of Watters’ own compositions as well as those by other artists.

== Production ==
The album was recorded in Decatur, Alabama.

== Critical reception ==
Cadence deemed the album "light jazz ... as innocuous as a summer zephyr." AllMusic called the album "a minor classic, an affirmation of the vitality of the jazz trombone, and an entertainingly joyful noise."

== Personnel ==
- Harry Watters - trombone
- Ken Watters - trumpet
- Andy Narell - steelpans
- Claire Watters - piccolo
- Steve Fidyk - drums
- Alan Wonneberger - recording, audio mixing

== Track listing ==
1. "The Island of Dr. Trombone" (Harry Watters) – 3:56
2. "Cherry Pink & Apple Blossom White" (Louis Guglielmi) – 4:33
3. "The Trainer on the Beach" (Harry Watters) – 4:39
4. "Theme from ‘I Dream of Jeannie’" (Hugo Montenegro) – 3:56
5. "You Are the Sunshine of My Life" (Stevie Wonder) – 3:57
6. "Fiesta Bay" (Harry Watters) – 3:33
7. "Here Comes the Sun" (George Harrison) – 3:49
8. "S.C. Is Hittin' the Beach" (Santa Claus Is Coming to Town) (Haven Gillespie/J. Fred Coots) – 5:07
9. "Trinidad" (Harry Watters) – 5:22
10. "Yesterday" (Lennon–McCartney) – 3:26
