= David Hanna =

David Hanna may refer to:

- David Blyth Hanna (1858–1938), Canadian railway executive
- David C. Hanna (1941–2026), British physicist
- David John Hanna (1866–1946), American politician
- David Hanna (entertainment journalist) (1917–1993), American author and entertainment journalist
- David Hanna (artist) (1941–1981), American artist
- David Hanna (author) (born 1967), American historian and son of the above-named artist

== See also ==
- David Hannah (born 1973), Scottish footballer
