= Abu Hanna =

Abu Hanna is an Arabic surname. People with the surname include:

- Hanna Abu-Hanna (1928–2022), Palestinian poet, writer, and researcher
- Joel Abu Hanna (born 1998), German-Israeli footballer
- Talleen Abu Hanna (born 1994), Palestinian-Israeli beauty pageant winner
- Umayya Abu-Hanna (born 1961), Palestinian-Finnish writer, journalist, and politician
