= Otho Kime =

American politician (1903–1987)

Member of the Nebraska Legislature from the 43rd district
- In office January 5, 1971 – January 5, 1977
- Preceded by: Don Hanna Jr.
- Succeeded by: Howard Lamb

Personal details
- Born: October 28, 1903 Kennedy, Nebraska
- Died: August 11, 1987 (aged 83) Valentine, Nebraska
- Party: Republican
- Spouse: Philomene Young (m. 1971)
- Children: 2 (Rachel, Ann)
- Education: University of Nebraska School of Agriculture; Nebraska State Teachers College
- Occupation: School teacher, rancher

Military service
- Allegiance: United States
- Branch/service: United States Army
- Years of service: 1942–1945
- Unit: 3rd Army, 4th Armored Division, Counterintelligence Corps

Otho Kime (October 28, 1903 – August 11, 1987) was a Republican politician from Nebraska who served as a member of the Nebraska Legislature from the 43rd district from 1971 to 1977.

== Early life ==
Kime was born in Kennedy, Nebraska, in 1903, and attended the University of Nebraska School of Agriculture and Nebraska State Teachers College.

In 1934, Kime ran for Cherry County Sheriff. He narrowly won the Republican primary, In the general election, he defeated Democratic nominee Dan Sears by a thin margin. He was re-elected in 1938 over Democrat Harve Williams in a landslide. He was elected the president of the Nebraska Sheriffs and Peace Officers Association in 1942.

Kime was re-elected without opposition in 1942. Shortly after his re-election, he joined the U.S. Army, serving in the Counterintelligence Corps during World War II. He was granted leave from the county during his service, and was succeeded by Valentine Police Chief Art Jones, who served as acting sheriff during Kime's absence. Kime resumed his duties as sheriff in 1946. He was re-elected without opposition in 1946. He resigned as sheriff on June 1, 1948, to serve as the assistant chief investigator for the Nebraska Stock Growers Association. In 1949, Kime moved to St. Francis, South Dakota, where he owned and operated a general store and served on the town council from 1949 to 1968.

== Nebraska Legislature ==
In 1970, Kime ran for the state legislature as a write-in candidate. He challenged incumbent Don Hanna Jr., who had been appointed by Governor Norbert Tiemann in 1969 following the resignation of Elvin Adamson, in the 43rd district, which included Brown, Cherry, Rock, and Sheridan counties. In the primary election, Kime needed to obtain at least 500 write-in votes to be nominated, and ultimately received 1,824 votes, or 34 percent of the vote, while Hanna received 66 percent. In the general election, Kime defeated Hanna in a landslide, winning 62 percent of the vote to Hanna's 38 percent.

Kime ran for re-election to a full term in 1972. No candidates filed to run against him, but farmer Floyd Burkinshaw filed as a write-in candidate. Kime received 92 percent of the vote in the primary election, Burkinshaw received 675 votes, or 8 percent of the vote, and advanced to the general election. Kime ultimately defeated Burkinshaw, winning 56 percent of the vote to Burkinshaw's 44 percent.

In 1976, Kime declined to seek re-election.

== Death ==
Kime died on August 11, 1987.
