= Love Songs (Harry Watters album) =

Studio album by Harry Watters
- Released: February 2, 2005
- Genre: Jazz
- Length: 55:54
- Label: Summit Records

Professional ratings
Review scores
Source	Rating
Online Trombone Journal	(not rated)

Love Songs is a 2005 album by trombonist Harry Watters. Though on the cover "Love Songs" seems to be only the subtitle, this is used as the full title on Watters’ website .

== Personnel ==
- Harry Watters - trombone
- Dan Roberts - piano
- Steve Fidyk - drums
- Glenn Dewey - bass

== Track listing ==
1. "All the Things You Are" (Hammerstein/Kern) – 4:42
2. "You Stepped Out of a Dream"(Nacio Herb Brown) – 5:20
3. "But Beautiful" (Van Heusen/Burke) – 6:18
4. "Just Squeeze Me" (Duke Ellington) – 6:43
5. "Night and Day" (Cole Porter) – 5:42
6. "My One And Only Love" (R. Mellin/G. Wood) – 6:44
7. "Am I Blue" (words - Grant Clarke, music - Harry Akst) – 5:39
8. "Angel Eyes" (words - Earl Brent, music - Matt Dennis)– 8:59
9. "When My Dreamboat Comes Home" (Dave Franklin/Cliff Friend) – 5:49
