= James Paul (conductor) =

American conductor

James Paul (born October 17, 1940 in Forest Grove, Oregon, U.S.) is an American conductor. He is currently the music director of the Oregon Coast Music Festival.

== Career ==
James Paul studied voice at the Oberlin Conservatory of Music and the Mozarteum in Salzburg, while conducting various student and professional organizations. Following his studies he was awarded the Serge Koussevitsky Memorial Conducting Prize presented by Erich Leinsdorf at the 1967 Tanglewood Music Festival.

Paul then served as conducting fellow with the St. Louis Symphony and conductor of the Bach Society of St. Louis. He subsequently took posts as associate conductor of the Kansas City Philharmonic and Milwaukee Symphony Orchestra.

In 1981 Paul was appointed music director of the Baton Rouge Symphony. Under the fifteen years under his leadership, the orchestra became a well-disciplined, highly recognized artistic entity. The Symphony shared the 1983 American Symphony Orchestra League award for most innovative programming with the Brooklyn Philharmonic and was also the only regional orchestra featured on the WFMT Fine Arts Network's Music in America series. In 1984, Paul founded the Baton Rouge Symphony Chorus. A high point of his tenure was the orchestra's triumphant performance on October 22, 1988, at Carnegie Hall in New York City. The program included Chadwick's Jubilee from Symphonic Sketches, Sibelius’ Symphony No. 2 and Beethoven's Piano Concerto Nr. 4 with soloist Abbey Simon. The concert received excellent reviews in both the New York and Louisiana newspapers. Following his final concerts in February 1998, Paul was named Conductor Emeritus, the only conductor so honored by the orchestra in its 50-year history.

Parallel to his tenure in Baton Rouge, Paul served for several years as music director of the Ohio Light Opera (conducting Gilbert and Sullivan and other light operas) and principal guest conductor of the Louisiana Philharmonic Orchestra.

As a guest conductor he has led the Chicago Symphony, the Cleveland Orchestra, the Symphonies of Pittsburgh, Philadelphia, Houston, Dallas, Seattle, San Diego, San Antonio, New Jersey, Oakland, Honolulu, Kansas City, Jacksonville and Detroit. Recent past engagements include the Houston Symphony, the Singapore Symphony, the National Symphony, the Minnesota Orchestra, the Baltimore Symphony, the San Francisco Symphony, the Saint Louis Symphony, the Buffalo Philharmonic the Calgary Philharmonic, Symphony Nova Scotia (Halifax), Vancouver Symphony, and the Utah Symphony.

In 1997, Paul recorded Paul Paray's Joan of Arc Mass and First Symphony with the Royal Scottish National Orchestra and Chorus. This recording received a Grammy nomination for "Best Choral Performance."

Paul was the classical music director and conductor of The Shedd Institute's Oregon Festival of American Music from 1997 to 2007, the artistic director of the Sewanee Summer Music Festival from 2006 to 2009, and served for six seasons as principal guest conductor of the Grant Park Music Festival in Chicago, Illinois. He was the co-founder and artistic director and conductor for The Shedd Institute's American Composers Series from 1997 to 2002 and its American Symphonia from 2002 to 2007.
