= George Hanna =

George Hanna may refer to:

== Politicians ==
- George Hanna (Australian politician), Australian Greens candidate in the 2019 Electoral results for the Division of Lingiari, Northern Territory
- George Hanna (Belfast MP) (1906–1964), Northern Irish barrister, politician and judge; son of the East Antrim MP
- George Hanna (MP for East Antrim) (1877–1938), Northern Irish barrister, politician and judge; father of the Belfast MP

== Others ==
- George Hanna (basketball), Iraqi Olympic basketball player
- George Hanna (translator), British Communist who worked in Russia as a translator
- Pat Hanna (George Patrick Hanna, 1888–1973), New Zealand soldier and entertainer

== See also ==
- George Hannah (disambiguation)
