= Harry Watters =

American jazz trombonist

- Origin: Huntsville, Alabama, U.S.
- Genres: Jazz
- Occupations: musician, band leader
- Instrument: trombone
- Labels: Summit Records
- Website: Official website

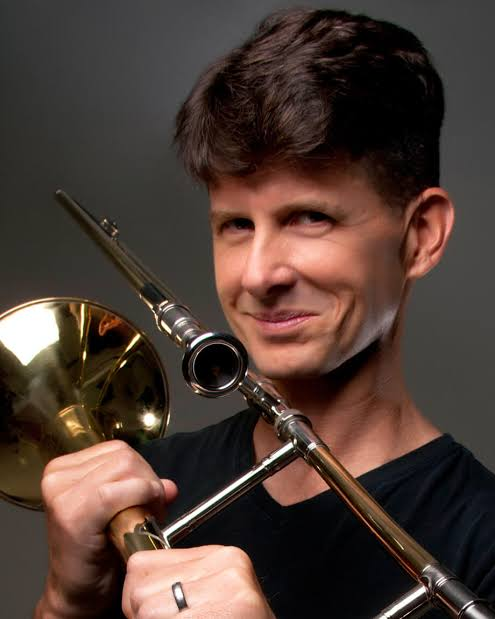

Harry Watters (born in Huntsville, Alabama, U.S.) is a noted jazz trombonist. He has performed across the United States with many jazz artists including Al Hirt, Pete Fountain, Shirley Jones, and many others. He has performed as a featured trombone soloist with the United States Army Orchestra, the West Virginia Symphony Orchestra, and the Syracuse Symphony, among others. He also appears annually at the Eastern Trombone Workshop.

== Biography ==
Watters grew up in Alabama in a family full of musicians. He graduated from the University of North Texas. He has since performed across the US, and teaches the clinic “Power Practicing” to students all around the country. He is married to Holly Watters, a violist and keyboardist who performs with the US Army Strings. The two currently reside in Alexandria, Virginia.

== Discography ==
- S'Wonderful: The Music of George Gershwin (1997)
- Brothers* (1999) Summit Records DCD-234
- Brothers II* (2000) Summit Records DCD-266
- The Island of Dr. Trombone (2000) Summit Records DCD-478
- Brothers III* (2003) Summit Records DCD-369
- Love Songs (2005) Summit Records DCD-411

* performed with brother Ken Watters
