= Jim Jones (Nebraska politician) =

American politician

Member of the Nebraska Legislature from the 43rd district
- In office January 6, 1993 – January 5, 2005
- Preceded by: Howard Lamb
- Succeeded by: Deb Fischer

Personal details
- Born: November 19, 1931 (age 94) Ashby, Nebraska
- Party: Republican
- Spouse: Patricia Ann McConnell (m. 1953)
- Children: 4 (Gordon, Steven, Vernon, Gregg)
- Occupation: Farmer and rancher

Military service
- Allegiance: United States
- Branch/service: United States Navy
- Years of service: 1950–1954

Jim Jones (born November 19, 1931) is a Republican politician from Nebraska who served as a member of the Nebraska Legislature from the 43rd district from 1993 to 2005.

== Early life ==
Jones was born in Ashby, Nebraska, in 1931, and gradudated from Maxwell High School. He served in the U.S. Navy during the Korean War from 1950 to 1954, and was a farmer and rancher in Eddyville.

== Nebraska Legislature ==
In 1992, State Senator Howard Lamb declined to seek re-election in the 43rd district, which included Blaine, Brown, Cherry, Custer, Grant, Hooker, Keya Paha, Logan, Loup, McPherson, Rock, Sheridan, and Thomas counties in northern Nebraska. Three candidates ran to succeed him, and Gordon Hyde and Jeff Kirkpatrick placed first in the primary election, advancing to the general election. However, Hyde withdrew from the general election, and Jones gathered signatures to appear on the general election ballot with the support of Hyde and Lamb. Jones ultimately defeated Kirkpatrick, winning 59 percent of the vote to Kirkpatrick's 41 percent.

Jones ran for re-election in 1996, and was re-elected unopposed. He ran for a third term in 2000, and no candidates filed to run against him. However, surgeon Cleve Trimble filed to run as a write-in candidate, and received 1,671 votes, and 23 percent of the vote, enough to advance to the general election. Jones only narrowly defeated Trimble in the general election, winning 52–48 percent.

In 2004, Jones opted against seeking a fourth term in the legislature, and was succeeded by Deb Fischer.
