= W. C. Handy Music Festival =

The W. C. Handy Music Festival is held annually in Florence, Alabama, sponsored by the Music Preservation Society, Inc., in honor of Florence native W. C. Handy, the "Father of the Blues." The non-profit Music Preservation Society was formed in 1982, with the mission to preserve, present, and promote the musical heritage of Northwest Alabama.

With the help and encouragement of musician and Sheffield native, Willie Ruff, the organization presented the first W.C. Handy Music Festival. That first festival was a long weekend of music, featuring Dizzy Gillespie as the headliner artist. Over the next two decades, the annual celebration has evolved into a ten-day Festival including over 250 events with music at locations throughout northwest Alabama. The Handy Festival has garnered praise and accolades and has become a major music festival in the Southeast. The Handy Festival has been selected as a Top Ten Event in Alabama; a three time Cultural Olympiad Designee by Atlanta Committee for the Olympic Games; a Location/Destination on the National Geographic Appalachian Regional Commission's Featured Sites Map; and a Top Twenty event in the Southeast since 1986 by Southeast Tourism Society. The Music Preservation Society, and the W.C. Handy Festival Committee, extends its heartfelt appreciation to the family of William Christopher Handy for its support of the W.C. Handy Music Festival.

The festival presents music of many varieties, including rock, pop, gospel, R & B and jazz. The roster of jazz musicians, known as the "Festival All-Stars," or the W. C. Handy Jazz All-Stars, includes noted musicians from all over the United States, such as guitarist Mundell Lowe, guitarist Lloyd Wells, drummer Bill Goodwin, pianist Laszlo Gardony, vibraphonist Chuck Redd, pianist / vocalist Johnny O'Neal, trumpeter Ken Watters, pianist / vocalist Ray Reach (Director of Student Jazz Programs at the Alabama Jazz Hall of Fame), pianist Gary Motley and flutist Holly Hofmann.

Each year, the W. C. Handy Jazz Camp is presented, jointly sponsored by the University of North Alabama and the W. C. Handy Music Festival.
