= Jim Hanna =

Jim Hanna may refer to:

- Jim Hanna (writer), American television comedy writer
- Jim Hanna (loyalist) (c. 1947–1974), senior member of the Northern Irish loyalist paramilitary organisation, the Ulster Volunteer Force

== See also ==
- Jim Hannah (1944–2016), American judge
- James Hanna (disambiguation)
