= John Hanna =

John Hanna may refer to:

- John Hanna (ice hockey) (1935–2005), Montreal Canadiens hockey player
- John Clark Hanna, founder of the original ELF
- John A. Hanna (1762–1805), United States Representative from Pennsylvania
- John Hanna (Indiana politician) (1827–1882), United States Representative from Indiana
- John Hanna (baseball) (1863–1930), 19th century major league baseball catcher
- John G. Hanna (1889–1948), American sailboat designer
- John William Hanna (1889–1962), Canadian merchant and politician
- John Hanna (prison officer) (c. 1947–1992), Northern Irish prison officer convicted of helping the IRA murder a colleague
- John Hanna (rower), British rower

== See also ==
- Jack Hanna (born 1947), American zookeeper
- John Hannah (disambiguation)
