= David Hanna (author) =

American historian

David Montgomery Hanna
- Born: May 27, 1967
- Occupations: Educator and historian
- Writing career
- Notable works: Knights of the Sea; Rendezvous with Death; Broken Icarus; History Nation

David Montgomery Hanna (born 1967), known as David Hanna, is an American historian. He teaches history at New York's Stuyvesant High School. His father was the artist David Hanna.

== Career ==
=== Teaching ===
Hanna began the NYC Spanish Civil War Volunteers project in 2020, which aims to research and archive the lives of volunteers who served in the Spanish Civil War from NYC. Students in Hanna's Spanish Civil War elective course research an assigned volunteer and later create a biography to be added to the archive.

=== Works ===
Hanna's first book, Knights of the Sea (2012), about the capture of the HMS Boxer during the War of 1812, was praised in the Portland Press Herald as having been written "with dignity and skill". His second book, Rendezvous with Death (2016), dealt with U.S. volunteers who served in the French armed forces during World War One, such as the poet Alan Seeger. Hanna was interviewed for a 2020 documentary about the Lafayette Escadrille. His third book, Broken Icarus (2022), was described by the Chicago Review of Books as a "gripping and rewarding" account of the 1933 Chicago World's Fair. Hanna's fourth book, History Nation: A Citizen’s Guide to the United States (2024), critically reviewed by the San Francisco Book Review, "explores different moments in American history, from the British encounter with Native Americans to more recent events like when Ronald Reagan gave his Farewell Address to the American people in 1989".

== Bibliography ==
- Knights of the Sea: The True Story of the Boxer and the Enterprise and the War of 1812 (2012) ISBN 9780451235626
- Rendezvous with Death: The Americans Who Joined the Foreign Legion in 1914 to Fight for France and for Civilization (2016) ISBN 9781621573968
- Broken Icarus: The 1933 Chicago World's Fair, the Golden Age of Aviation, and the Rise of Fascism (2022) ISBN 9781633886766
- History Nation: A Citizen's Guide to the History of the United States (2024) ISBN 9798218389833
