= John Hannah =

John Hannah may refer to:

- John Hannah (Methodist), called the elder (1792–1867), English Wesleyan minister
- John Hannah (archdeacon of Lewes), the younger, (1818–1888), his son, Anglican priest and schoolmaster
- John Hannah (dean of Chichester) (1843–1931), his son, Anglican priest
- John Hannah (VC) (1921–1947), Scottish RAF radio operator
- John Hannah (American football) (born 1951), American football player
- John Hannah (actor) (born 1962), Scottish actor
- John Hannah (footballer) (born 1962), English football forward
- John A. Hannah (1902–1991), American academic administrator and head of USAID
- John D. Hannah (born c. 1940s), American academic
- John H. Hannah Jr. (1939–2003), U.S. federal judge
- John P. Hannah (born 1962), American government administrator
- Jack Hannah (John Frederick Hannah, 1913–1994), American animation artist

== See also ==
- John Hanna (disambiguation)
