= James Hanna =

James Hanna may refer to:

- James Hanna (American football) (born 1989)
- James Hanna (trader) (died 1787), British maritime fur trader
- James Hanna (judge) (1816-1872), American judge

== See also ==
- Jim Hanna (disambiguation)
- James Hanna McCormick, soldier and Ulster Unionist Party politician
- Jim Hannah (James Robert Hannah, 1944–2016), American judge
