= Umayya Abu-Hanna =

Palestine-born Finnish politician, journalist and writer

- أمية أبو حنا
- Born: 17 March 1961 (age 65); Haifa, Israel
- Occupations: Writer, journalist, activist
- Children: 1
- Relatives: Hanna Abu-Hanna (father)

Umayya Abu-Hanna (Arabic: أمية أبو حنا; born 17 March 1961) is a Palestinian-Finnish writer, journalist, and former member of the Helsinki City Council. She was born in Haifa, Israel, into a Palestinian family. Abu-Hanna moved to Finland in 1981, and she subsequently received Finnish citizenship. In 2011, she moved to Amsterdam where she resides with her South African daughter.

== Career ==
In the 1980s, Abu-Hanna was a member of the Helsinki City Council (for the Green Party) and a member of the Real Estate Board of Helsinki.

In the 1990s, she was a journalist, documentary maker and columnist. She became known to the wider public as the first non-white presenter of the weekly current affairs news-program Ajankohtainen Kakkonen at the Finnish Broadcasting Company YLE.

In the 2000s, she was member of the Arts Council Finland (2004–2009) and was the first chair of its Multicultural Board. Abu-Hanna was also the cultural diversity adviser of the Finnish National Gallery.

Her first novel, Nurinkurin, was published in 2003. Her book on identity, Sinut, was published in 2007. A manual for the cultural field, Multikulti, was published in 2012. A cultural history of modern Helsinki, Alienin Silmin, was published in 2014. She co-authored A changing world, perspectives on heritage, with case studies of museums in Afghanistan.

== Bibliography ==
- Nurinkurin (2003)
- Sinut (2007)
- Multkikulti (2012)
- Alienin silmin (2014)
- A Changing World, perspectives on heritage (2014)
- Columns, Metro
- Columns, Suomen Kuvalehti
- Columns, Helsingin Sanomat
- Columns, Finnair's in-flight magazine: Blue Wings

== Awards ==
- Larin Paraske Award, The Kalevala Women's Association (2008)
- "Finn of the Year", The Finnish Civic Society (2004)
- Finland Award (2003), Ministry of Education
- Bonnier Group Award (2002) for journalistic innovation
