= Stanley S. Hanna =

Stanley Sweet Hanna (17 May 1920, in Sagaing – 27 December 2012, in Palo Alto, California) was an American physicist.

Stanley Hanna was born in Burma to missionary parents. At age fourteen he was sent to the Fannie Doane Home for missionary children in Granville, Ohio, where he attended high school and then graduated with A.B. from Denison University in 1941. From 1941 to 1944 he was a graduate student in physics at Johns Hopkins University. From 1945 to 1946 he was in the U.S. Army and worked at Los Alamos. In 1947 he received his Ph.D. from Johns Hopkins University. There he was an instructor from 1946 to 1949 and an assistant professor from 1949 to 1955. He worked at Argonne National Laboratory with pay grade of physicist from 1955 to 1960 and senior physicist from 1960 to 1963. At Stanford University he was a full professor from 1963 to 1990, when he retired as professor emeritus.

Hanna was a Guggenheim Fellow for the academic year 1958–1959, which he spent at the University of Oxford. He held visiting positions at a number of academic institutions around the world.

One of the highlights of his career was his use of the Mossbauer effect to discover the nuclear Zeeman spectrum in ^{57}Fe, the most common isotope of iron.

His interpretation of this spectrum lead to a determination of the magnetic moment of the excited state of this nucleus, and gave the direction and magnitude of the hyperfine field which was unexpectedly opposite to the direction of the magnetic field.

The demonstration that the 14.4 keV level of ^{57}Fe was an ideal Mössbauer example produced a veritable explosion in the discoveries of new physical phenomena.

He obtained the first nuclear Zeeman spectrum of ^{119}Sn, a 'nonmagnetic' atom in a magnetic alloy. Stan extended his study of hyperfine fields to implanted ions as well as free ions. He utilized large decoupling fields to preserve nuclear alignment and to measure nuclear g-factors.

Hanna was a pioneer in using large sodium iodide crystals to study gamma rays from giant resonances in a variety of nuclei. He and his team pioneered the use polarized protons to precisely measure electric quadrupole and dipole resonances.

Hanna and his team were the first to observe the lowest T = 2 isospin resonances of compound nuclei and their radiative decay.

He was a pioneer of using polarized beams of β-emitting nuclei for important new applications.

He developed the method of producing polarized beta-emitting nuclei by use of a polarized gas jet target in a nuclear reaction. He used the pion charge-exchange reaction to excite analogue giant resonances in light nuclei and to show convincingly the existence of isospin splitting.

In 2016 the Hanna Visiting Professorship was established in his honor. He married Jane Martin on 27 December 1942. Upon his death in 2012 he was survived by his widow, a son, a daughter, four grandchildren, and a great-grandchild. Another son died in 1992.
