= Mark Hanna (disambiguation) =

Mark Hanna (1837–1904) was an American industrialist and politician.

Mark Hanna may also refer to:

- Mark Hanna (screenwriter) (1917–2003), American screenwriter and actor
- Mark Hanna, American stockbroker who was portrayed in the film The Wolf of Wall Street
- Mark Hanna, defendant who was acquitted in the English court case R v Coulson, Brooks and others

== See also ==
- Mark Hanna Crouter (1897–1942), U.S. Navy officer and Navy Cross recipient
- Marcus Hanna (lighthouse keeper) (1842–1921), lighthouse keeper and Medal of Honor recipient
