= William Hanna (disambiguation) =

William Hanna (1910–2001) was an American animator, director, producer and cartoon artist.

William or Bill Hanna may also refer to:

- William B. Hanna (1866–1930), American sportswriter
- William S. Hanna (1923–1994), Howard County Maryland politician
- William T. Hanna (1920–1942), U.S. Marine
- William Hanna (minister) (1808–1882), Scottish theological writer and biographer
- William Hanna (railroad president) (born 1827), namesake of Hanna City, Illinois, U.S.
- William Fahmy Hanna (born 1928), Egyptian Olympic athlete
- William John Hanna (1862–1919), lawyer and political figure in Ontario, Canada
- William Selim Hanna (1896–1980), Egyptian Minister of Housing

== See also ==
- William Hannah (1867–1942), cricket umpire
- Willie Hannah (1921–1978), Scottish footballer
- William W. Hannan (1854–1917), Detroit real estate developer
