= Lucy Hanna =

American artist, photographer, and filmmaker

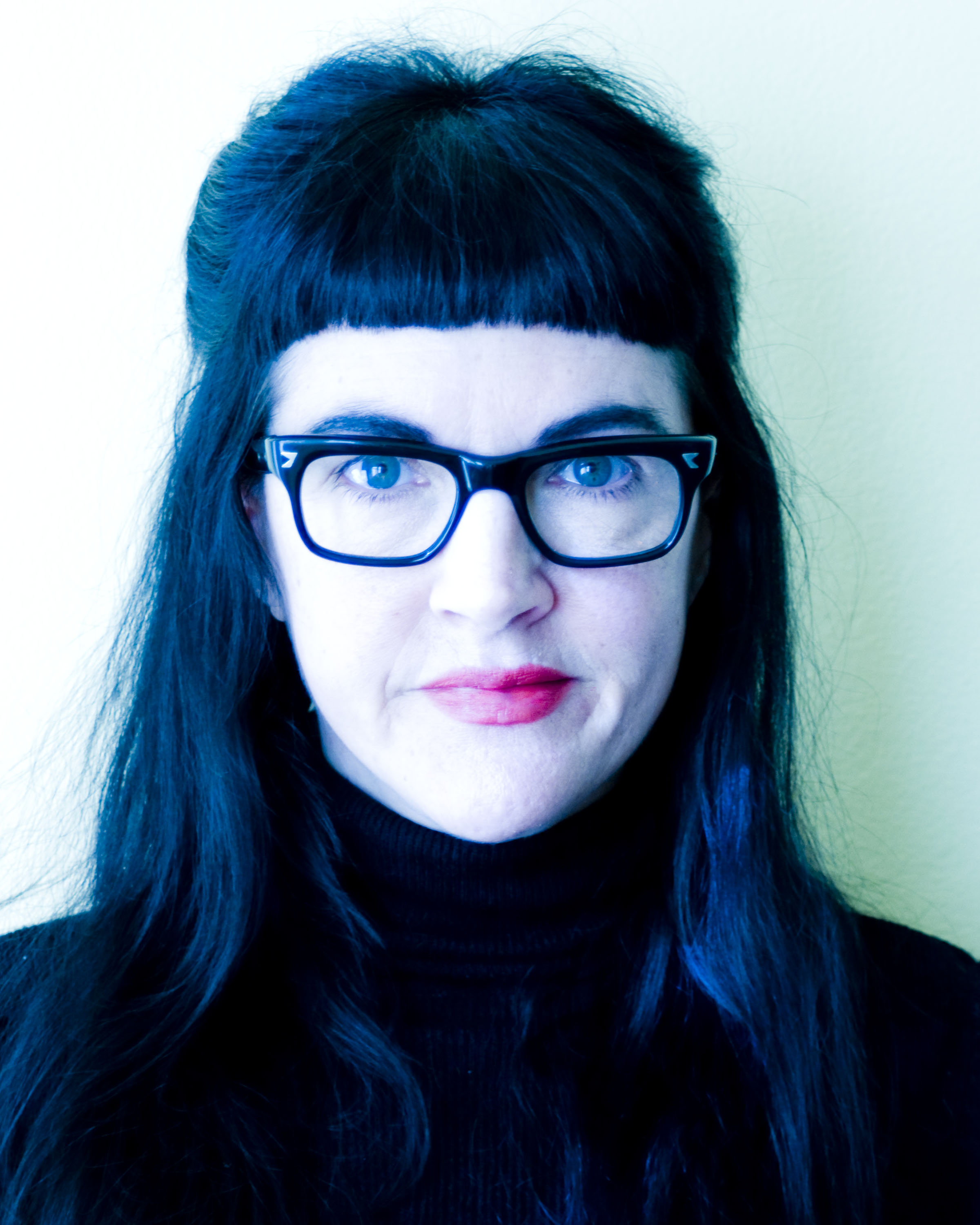
- 2015
- Known for: Photography
- Website: Official website

Lucy Hanna is an American artist, photographer, and filmmaker based in Seattle, Washington and San Francisco, California.

Hanna directed the film Shaken & Stirred (2009) and has photographed Mia Zapata, a Seattle singer that fronted the punk band The Gits.

== Life and work ==
Hanna moved from Wichita, Kansas, to Seattle, Washington, in 1989 and photographed the Seattle music scene during the 1990s.

She has a Bachelor of Arts degree in Film and Sculpture and has attended the San Francisco Art Institute (SFAI) studying under artist Tony Labat and filmmaker Jay Rosenblatt.

Hanna's photographs of Mia Zapata, a Seattle singer that fronted the punk band The Gits, were included prominently in the 2008 documentary film The Gits and were included in the 2003 reissue of the Gits album Enter: The Conquering Chicken and in periodicals SPIN, CMJ, Seattle Weekly, Dazed & Confused, Rockrgirl, The Seattle Times, and Rolling Stone. They were also used in episodes of the television shows 48 Hours and Dateline NBC.

She appeared (along with Tad Doyle of the band TAD) in Paul Westerberg's "Dyslexic Heart" music video from the motion picture Singles.

In 2013, The Project Room in Seattle hosted These Streets, a play that was based on and celebrated women musicians of 80s and 90s Seattle, included an interview by Hana (DBA Lucy Hanna) of Elizabeth Davis-Simpson and Valerie Agnew (formerly of Seattle band 7 Year Bitch) on music, bands and life. A group exhibit, curated by Gretta Harley and Sarah Rudinoff, included Hanna's photographs (DBA Lucy Hanna) of Mia Zapata with The Gits, Gretta Harley, and 7 Year Bitch. From NPR's All Things Considered: "So Harley and Rudinoff set out to tell that story. They starting talking to women who'd been part of Seattle's rock community, and eventually videotaped more than 30 conversations with women like Valerie Agnew and Elizabeth Davis, the drummer and the bassist for the band 7 Year Bitch. Davis and Agnew recall that the female musicians of the Pacific Northwest were far from invisible, especially when they toured Europe. Their promotion was a little inaccurate, though: Show posters would advertise them as 'the godmothers of Riot Grrls,' even though the Riot Grrl movement got its start 60 miles south of Seattle, in Olympia, and many of the Seattle women say they were more into music than Riot Grrl feminism."

== Films ==
Shaken & Stirred (2009) – director

Film Festivals

- 2010 The Portland Oregon Women’s Film Festival (POW Fest) Shaken & Stirred (1:47) Experimental Short Editor, Director, Producer
- 2009 Tallgrass Film Festival Shaken & Stirred Animation Short Editor, Director, Producer

== Periodicals Photography ==
2008, Tedder, Michael, “Hot Topic: Home Alive,” CMJ

2008 Fry, Ted. “Film Gives The Gits New Life,” The Seattle Times

Fry, Ted. “Mia Zapata, the Gits get their due in fan's documentary”, The Seattle Times

Levin, Hannah. “Never Mind The Sniveling, It’s The Gits”, Seattle Weekly

Drea, Amber. “Doc Celebrates Slain Singer”, AM New York

2003 Lotta, Tess. “Another Shot of Whisky: Remembering Mia,” Rockrgrl Magazine

1996 Ryba, Jadwiga. “Pusty Smiech”, TYKLO Rock (now Teraz Rock)

1995 White, Emily. “Dead Again”, SPIN Magazine

1994 Rose, Synthia. “Life After Death”, DAZED (& CONFUSED)

1993 Philly, Bert. “Pop Sickle”, Puncture Magazine

1993 SPIN News. “Mia Zapata”, SPIN Magazine, August Issue

Rosen, Larry. “No Ulterior Motive” (Cover & Inside), MONTH Magazine

== Compact Disc Photography ==
2008 The Gits, The Best Of The Gits, Adrenaline Records, ADA Warner Music Group 1994 The Gits, Enter: The Conquering Chicken, C/Z Records, Seattle, WA (Inside Photo)

Danger Gens, Evil Bed Set, Crunch Melody, Seattle, WA (Cover Photo) 1993 Pop Sickle, Under The Influence, C/Z Records, Seattle, WA (Cover/All Photography)

== Published Photography ==
2013 Tom Howells, editor, Late Century Dream: Movements in the US Indie Music Underground, Black Dog Publishing

2005 Raha, Maria, Cinderella’s Big Score, Seal Press/Avalon Publishing, Emeryville, CA. ISBN 9781580051163.
