= Howard Lamb =

American politician (1924–2015)

Member of the Nebraska Legislature from the 43rd district
- In office January 5, 1977 – January 6, 1993
- Preceded by: Otho Kime
- Succeeded by: Jim Jones

Personal details
- Born: October 8, 1924 Bassett, Nebraska
- Died: November 24, 2015 (aged 91) Kearney, Nebraska
- Party: Republican
- Spouse: Jo Kellenbarger (m. 1949)
- Children: 2 (Philip, David)
- Education: University of Nebraska (B.S.)
- Occupation: Farmer-rancher

Howard A. Lamb (October 8, 1924 – November 24, 2015) was a Republican politician from Nebraska who served as a member of the Nebraska Legislature from the 43rd district from 1977 to 1993.

== Early life ==
Lamb was born in Bassett, Nebraska, in 1924. He graduated from Rock County High School, and served in the U.S. Navy during World War II. He attended the University of Nebraska, receiving his bachelor's degree in agricultural engineering in 1949. He was a farmer and rancher in Anselmo, and served on the Anselmo-Merna Board of Education and on the Custer Public Power District Board of Directors.

== Nebraska Legislature ==
In 1976, Lamb announced that he would run for the state legislature from the 43rd district, which included Blaine, Brown, Cherry, Custer, Hooker, Keya Paha, Logan, McPherson, Rock, and Thomas counties. Incumbent State Senator Otho Kime declined to seek re-election, and ran against Vaughn Helberg, Leonard Pelc, and Lawrence Peterson, all of whom were fellow farmers, in the nonpartisan primary. Lamb placed first in the primary by a wide margin, winning 50 percent of the vote to Peterson's 27 percent, Helberg's 14 percent, and Pelc's 9 percent. In the general election, Lamb defeated Peterson in a landslide, winning 72–28 percent.

Lamb ran for re-election in 1980, and was re-elected unopposed.

In 1984, Lamb ran for re-election to a third term, and was challenged by mail carrier Karl Kemp. He placed first in the primary, receiving 82 percent of the vote to Kemp's 18 percent. They advanced to the general election, where Lamb defeated Kemp, 79–21 percent.

Lamb ran for a fourth term in 1988. He was challenged by Jeff Kirkpatrick, a high school substitute teacher and coach. In the primary, Lamb placed first, winning 67 percent of the vote to Kirkpatrick's 33 percent. In the general election, Lamb defeated Kirkpatrick with 57 percent of the vote, a margin that observers noted was "closer than expected."

In 1991, Lamb announced that he would not seek a fifth term in 1992.

== Death ==
Lamb died on November 24, 2015.
