= Oregon Festival of American Music =

American summer music festival

Oregon Festival of American Music is an eclectic, thematically-based summer music festival that has been held annually in Eugene, Oregon since 1992. Produced by The John G. Shedd Institute for the Arts, OFAM (as it is referred to locally) has, throughout its history, explored American music in all of its forms, but in recent years has focused its attention specifically on the Great American Songbook and related genres.

== Organization History ==
Oregon Festival of American Music was founded in 1991 as a two-day summer orchestral pops festival dedicated to the championship of American classical music with American conductor Marin Alsop serving as music director and conductor. In 1993 the Festival was designated as a Resident Company of the Hult Center for the Performing Arts. By 1995 the organization had significantly expanded its vision of cultural service beyond orchestral repertoire, which led to a significant re-orientation of the festival towards a more eclectic program of American music, including jazz, historic popular, and diverse folk traditions alongside of a continued commitment to the American art music tradition.

Under the principal supervision of longtime executive director James Ralph, the festival has been under the artistic leadership of a diverse group of music directors, including Cajun fiddle master Michael Doucet, American conductor James Paul and jazz pianist & composer Dick Hyman. Under the dual leadership of Hyman and Paul from 1998 to 2006, OFAM undertook a series of highly diverse and innovative programs that was established by Doucet and Paul in 1997 and continued with Paul and Hyman through 2001. In 2002 the festival introduced musical theater to its production mix and shifted its principal focus to the exploration and celebration of the American Songbook, leaving its art music initiative in the hands of its other annual concert programs. From 2007 to 2014 jazz clarinetist Ken Peplowski served at the Festival's music director, jazz saxophonist Jesse Cloninger served in that role from 2015 to 2017 and remains an active guest director. Vibraphonist Chuck Redd assumed the role of music director in 2019.

In 1996 Oregon Festival of American Music expanded its cultural service mix to include a year-round community music school and year-round concert programming in diverse musical genres packaged in several concert series and festivals. In 2002 the company moved into Eugene's original First Baptist Church building, adding cultural/educational venue management to its services. In 2004 it officially changed its name to The John G. Shedd Institute for the Arts, reserving "Oregon Festival of American Music" for its flagship August festival.

In March 2022 The Shedd Institute introduced a one-week winter edition of the Oregon Festival of American Music intended as a companion to its two-week summer offering.

== Programming History ==
Oregon Festival of American Music's thematically-based programming model falls into 3 distinct periods: Under the music direction of Alsop from 1992-96 the festival was largely a summer symphony orchestra pops festival. From 1997-2001 Paul, Hyman and Ralph headed a creative effort that included a balance of orchestral, jazz, historic popular and traditional musical genres with regular commissions that often included ballet. Since 2002 the festival has focused specifically on a systematic annual treatment of the Classic Songbook/Great American Songbook, with a de-emphasis of art music in favor of musical theater and concerts that focus on various treatments of the Songbook, ranging from musical theatre and straight vocal interpretations to standards-based jazz. Themes run the range of the American musical landscape:

- 2023 If Only In My Dreams: America at War, 1941-45
- 2023 (Winter) I'll Be Seeing You: From Swing to The Cool, 1938-52
- 2022 Pennies From Heaven: The Music of American In Hard Times, 1929-39
- 2022 (Winter) Avalon: The Birth of American Popular Music, 1917-29
- 2021 Reel Music: Sampling the Soundtrack
- 2019 Might As Well Be Swing: Reflections on the Age of Swing, 1928-46
- 2018 In the Hands of the Muses: Tributes to Songbook masters & mentors
- 2017 The Sweetest Melody: Giants of the Classic Songbook
- 2016 G.I. Jive: Good Cheer From Home, 1939-1945
- 2015 Fine And Dandy: In the Age of Jazz, 1921–34
- 2014 Son Of Hollywood! The Songbook still at The Movies, 1939–55
- 2013 Hooray For Hollywood! The Songbook at the Movies, 1930–45
- 2012 Le Jazz Hot: America in the City of Light, 1919–39
- 2011 Too Marvelous For Words: Ella, Frank and the Classic American Song
- 2010 Brush Up Your Shakespeare: A Literary Romp Through The Songbook
- 2009 Time After Time: Great Moments in American Songbook History
- 2008 Over The Rainbow: The Music of America in Hard Times, 1929-1945
- 2007 Richard Rodgers: The Sweetest Sounds
- 2006 Irving Berlin's America
- 2005 Cole Porter Night And Day
- 2004 The Fabulous Fifties
- 2003 Easy To Remember: The Great American Songbook
- 2002 Gershwin Transformations
- 2001 Loco-Motion: Rhythm & The New World In The Age Of Machines
- 2000 Le Jazz Hot: Americans in Paris, 1919-1955
- 1999 How Sweet The Sound: From Gospel to Swing
- 1998 Rags, Jazz, Blues & Boogie-Woogie
- 1997 Louisiana Gumbo: From Gottschalk to Zydeco
- 1996 Broadway Medley
- 1995 Fiddlers' Cross-Stitch: Classical Needle, Country Thread
- 1994 On Airwaves & Silver Screens
- 1993 Harlem Rhapsody: James P. Johnson & The Harlem Renaissance
- 1992 The Real American Folksong: George Gershwin & American Classic Tradition
