= David Hanna (artist) =

American artist

William David Hanna
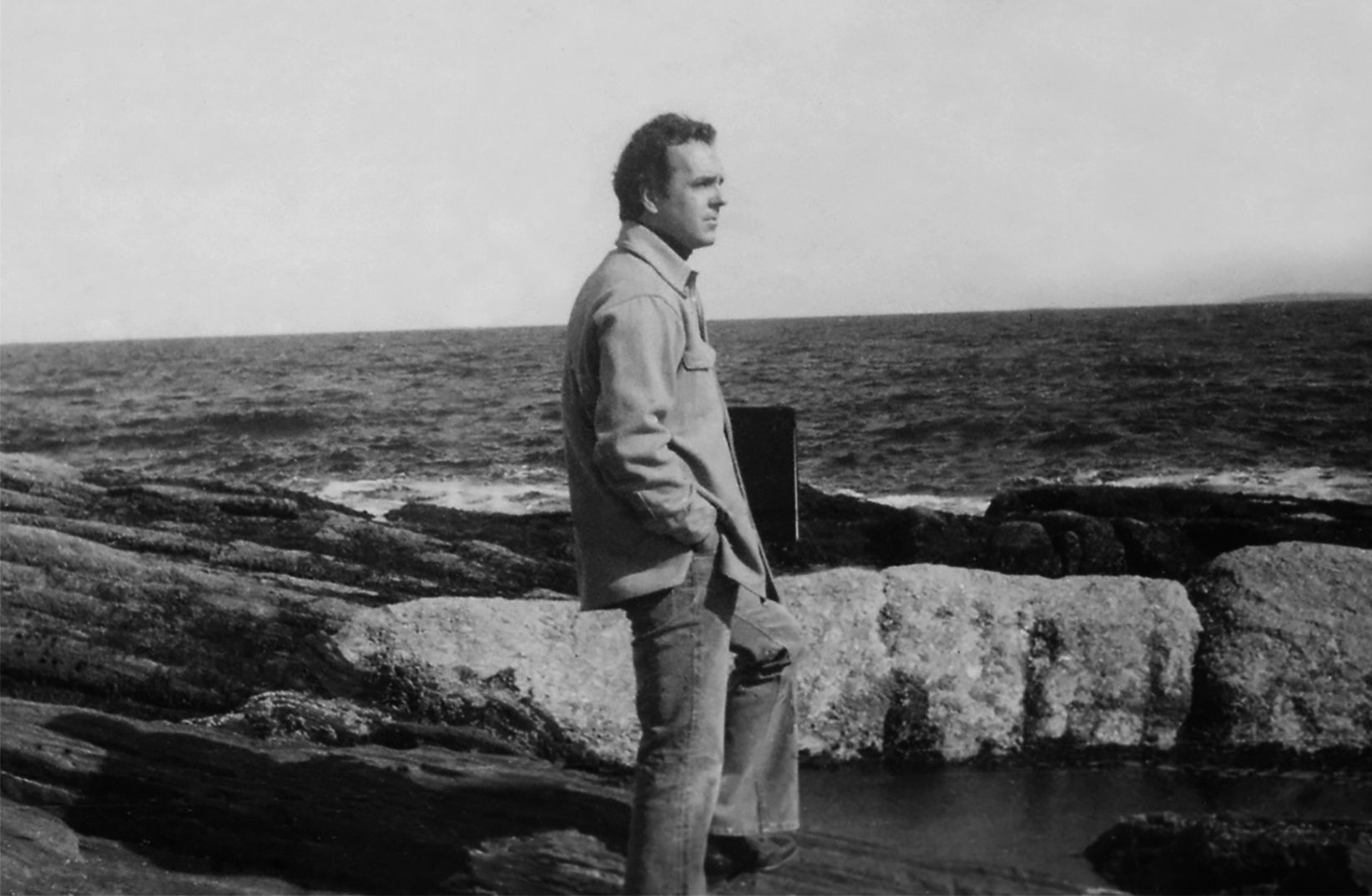
- David Hanna, Pemaquid Point, Maine, 1971, photographed by Ivan Walter Flye
- Born: August 31, 1941; Pittsburgh, Pennsylvania
- Died: January 13, 1981 (aged 39); Jeannette, Pennsylvania
- Resting place: Round Pond, Maine
- Style: Realist painting
- Spouse: Carol Elco (m. 1959)
- Children: 7 including David Hanna (Jnr)
- Website: www.davidhanna.org

William David Hanna (August 31, 1941 – January 13, 1981), known as David Hanna, was an American artist who produced paintings, prints, and sculpture in media that included oil, egg tempera, watercolor, drybrush, ink, graphite, Conté crayon, etching and bronze. Hanna lived and worked in Pittsburgh, Pennsylvania, and Bristol, Maine. His art predominantly focused on the structures, furnishings, and people of those regions.

== Biography ==
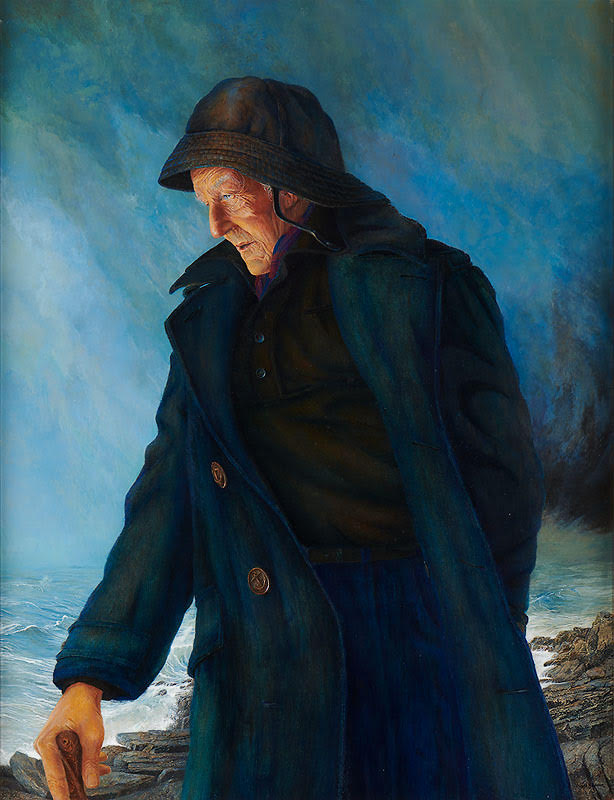
Final Farewell, 1975

=== Early life ===
David Hanna was born in 1941 in Pittsburgh, Pennsylvania, the youngest child of a large working-class family. Hanna left school at the age of 14 to work at a gas station and then a dance studio. In 1959, he married Carolyn Jean Elco, a dance instructor. From 1960 to 1964, Hanna served in the Army Special Services, Airborne Division in Laos and Vietnam. While in the military, he earned the equivalent of a high school diploma.

=== Career ===
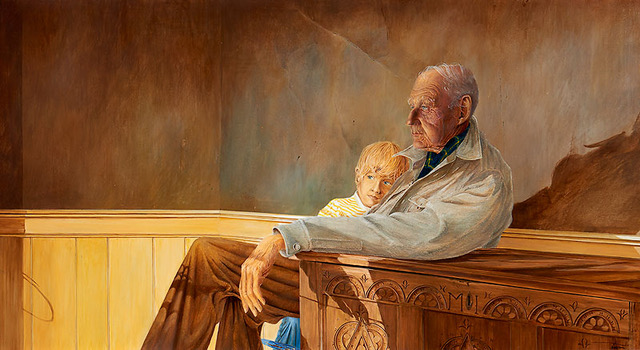
Two Different Horizons, 1971

In 1964, Hanna returned to Pittsburgh and began pursuing a career as an artist. His work was first shown in an exhibit at the Pittsburgh Playhouse in 1965, where he displayed 17 paintings. In 1966, he moved to Chester County, Pennsylvania, to study the Brandywine tradition of American realist painting. That same year, members of the Mellon family organized an exhibit of Hanna's work in Ligonier, Pennsylvania, and by 1967, his work had been featured at galleries including the International Art Gallery in South Hills, Pennsylvania, and the Washington Gallery of Art in the Georgetown neighborhood of Washington, DC.

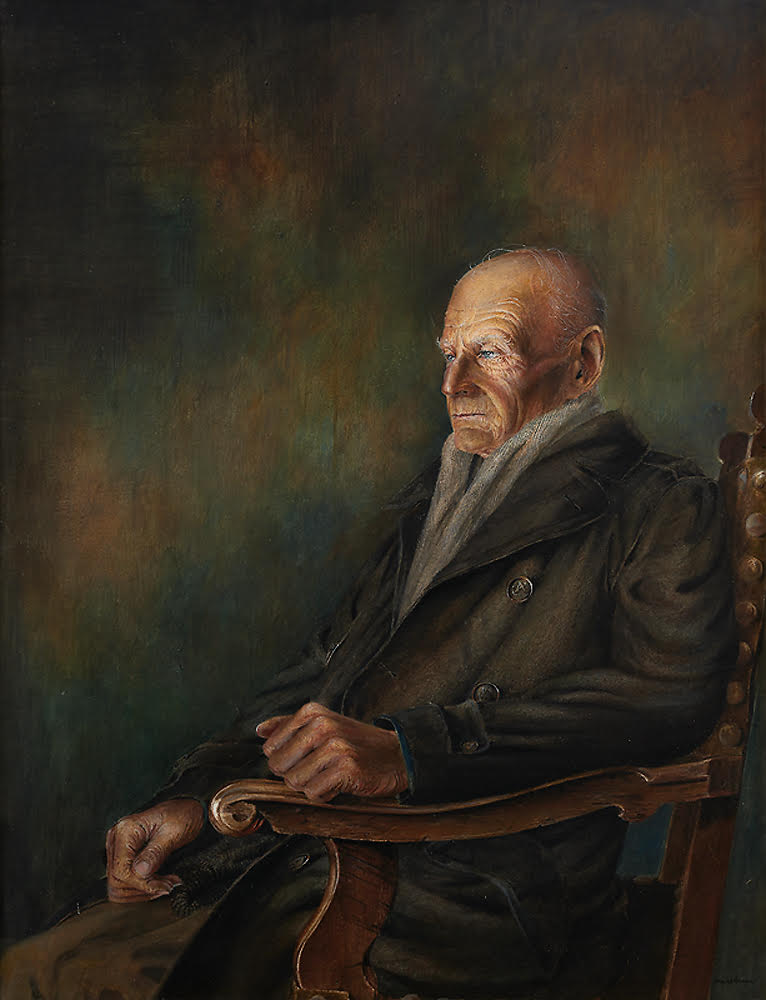
Night Watch, 1971

In 1967, Hanna moved with his family to Bristol, Maine. The family first resided in the Pemaquid Point Lighthouse and later in a house in the village of Round Pond. A large body of work between 1968 and 1975 includes paintings and drawings such as Two Different Horizons (1971), Night Watch (1971), and Final Farewell (1975) depicting Captain Alexander Breede (d. 1971), a retired seaman.

Hanna continued to paint, draw, and sculpt through the 1970s. His work was shown in museums and galleries including the West Virginia University Creative Arts Center and the Westmoreland Museum of American Art, drawing interest from collectors and commentators including Paul A. Chew, a former director of the Westmoreland, and George Nama, an artist and teacher of draftsmanship and printmaking at the University of Pittsburgh. In a critical essay, Chew wrote: "It is gratifying to see David Hanna develop a personal, stylistic interpretation of the American tradition of realist painting that has been established by some of our greatest artists—Winslow Homer, Thomas Eakins, and Edward Hopper."

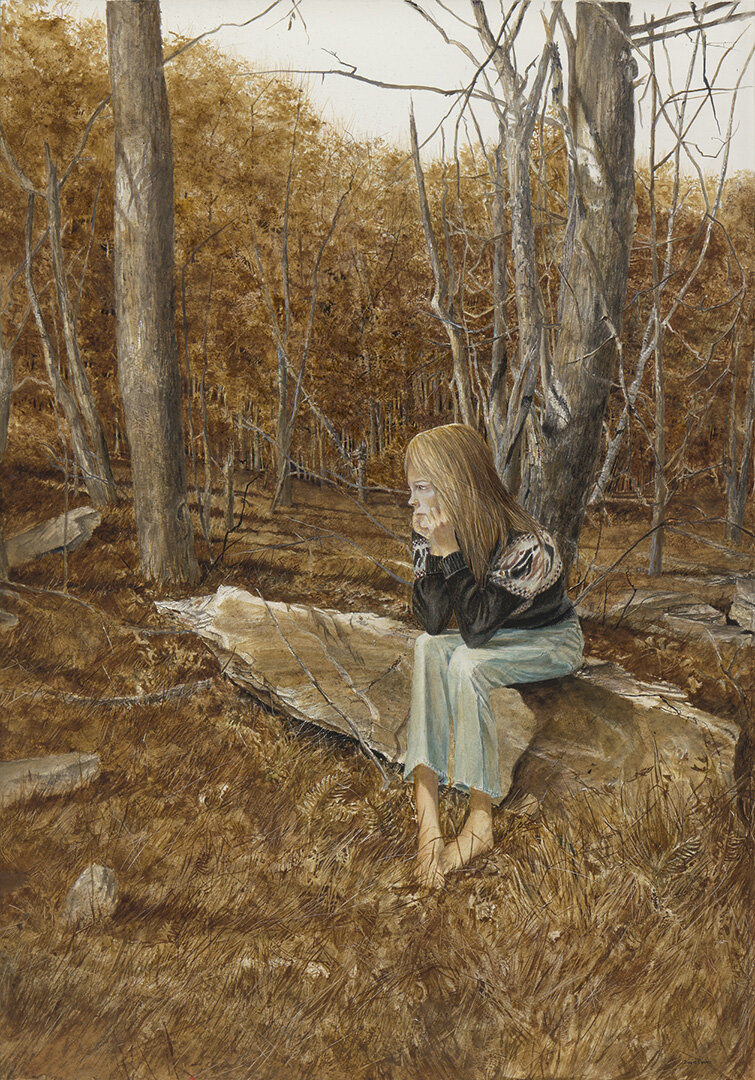
A Million Miles Away, 1971

In 1971, Hanna was included in the traveling exhibition "Brandywine Tradition Artists: Featuring the works of Howard Pyle, Frank E. Schoonover, the Wyeth Family, Charles Colombo, David Hanna (1971-1972)," which showed in six museums across the United States.

During the 1970s, Hanna also contributed works to a 1973 book titled The White House Gardens: A History and Pictorial Record with commentary by Rachel Lambert Mellon, often known as Bunny Mellon, a renowned horticulturalist, gardener, and art collector whose family owned a number of Hanna's works.

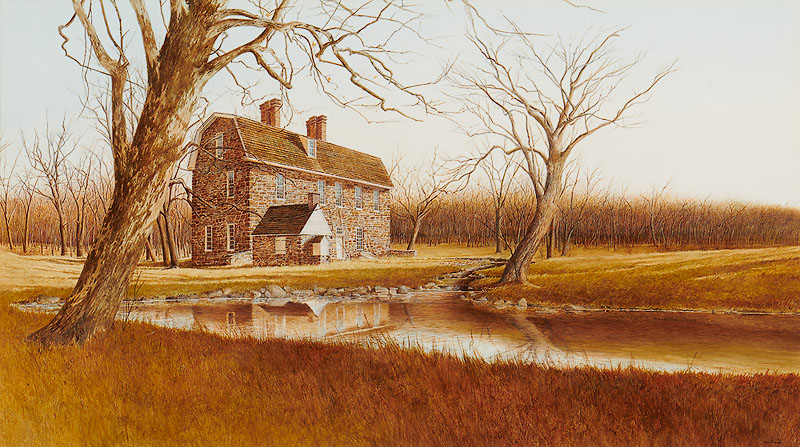
The Keith House, 1974–1975

The exhibition "David Hanna: Paintings, Watercolors, Drawings", organized in 1977 by Chew at the Westmoreland Museum of American Art, featured 78 artworks including depictions of Hanna’s children such as A Million Miles Away (1971), the architecture and furnishings of his native Pennsylvania, and the landscape, buildings, and inhabitants of Maine and other New England states, such as The Keith House (1974-1975).

Hanna suffered a fatal heart attack on January 13, 1981, while traveling in Pennsylvania. He was survived by his wife and seven children, which includes his son, historian David Hanna. A memorial exhibition was organized at the Westmoreland Museum of American Art in May 1981. In 2018, the estate of David Hanna began a catalogue raisonné project to document the artist's body of work.
