= Chuck Redd =

American drummer (born 1958)

- Born: September 10, 1958 (age 68)
- Genre: Jazz
- Occupation: Musician
- Instruments: Vibraphone, drums
- Label: Arbors
- Website: www.chuckredd.com

Chuck Redd (born September 10, 1958) is an American jazz drummer and vibraphonist.

== Career ==
Redd began touring and recording when he joined the Charlie Byrd Trio at the age of 21. He also joined The Great Guitars (Barney Kessel, Charlie Byrd, and Herb Ellis). To his credit are 25 European tours and six tours of Japan with the Barney Kessel Trio, Ken Peplowski, Terry Gibbs and Conte Candoli.

Redd was the featured vibraphonist with the Mel Tormé All-Star Jazz Quintet from 1991 until 1996. While appearing in New York with Tormé, Ira Gitler of Jazz Times wrote: "Redd's vibes were equally notable for vigor and melodiousness."

Redd's career highlights include a concert with the Dizzy Gillespie Quintet in Africa for the Namibian Independence Celebration, a recital at the White House with the Barney Kessel Trio, concerts at Carnegie Hall with Mel Tormé's Quintet, and appearances on The Tonight Show. In 2008, he was a featured soloist in the finale concert at The Lionel Hampton International Jazz Festival with The Lionel Hampton Big Band and the Clayton/Hamilton Jazz Orchestra. In February 2013, Redd performed with the Dream Band co-led with Jeff Hamilton in a salute to vibes legend Terry Gibbs.

Engagements include stints with Bucky Pizzarelli and Ken Peplowski at Dizzy's Club (Jazz at Lincoln Center) performances at Smalls Jazz Club and Jazz at the Kitano in New York City, jazz cruises, and jazz festivals around the US. He has toured and performed with Dizzy Gillespie, Mel Tormé, Tommy Flanagan, Dick Hyman, Ray Brown, Monty Alexander, Laurindo Almeida, Tal Farlow, Rebecca Kilgore, Scott Hamilton, Mickey Roker, and Houston Person.

Redd is a regular featured performer at The Shedd Institute's Oregon Festival of American Music, The Roswell Jazz Festival, The Newport Beach Jazz Party and The W. C. Handy Music Festival. He has been the director of Oregon Festival of American Music 2019.

Redd served as Artist-In-Residence at The Smithsonian Jazz Café in Washington, DC from 2004–2008. In addition to leading his own groups, he was a member of the Smithsonian Jazz Masterworks Orchestra for 15 years.

Redd is on the faculty at The University of Maryland School of Music and presents master classes, workshops and lectures around the country.

In December 2025, Redd cancelled the annual Kennedy Christmas Eve jazz concert at the Kennedy Center, which had been hosted by Redd since 2006, because of the addition of U.S. President Donald Trump's name to the Center. President of the Kennedy Center Richard Grenell declared that this was a political stunt and he intended to sue Redd for US$1M in retaliation. The breach-of-contract lawsuit, filed in March, 2026, was dismissed by the court in June. The center was ordered to pay Redd $252,479.70 in legal costs in August 2026.

== Discography ==
Redd is featured on over 75 recordings, including his Arbors Records albums, The Common Thread, Happy All the Time: Chuck Redd Remembers Barney Kessel, and All This and Heaven Too; Chopin Jazz with Rossano Sportiello, You're My Everything with Dick Hyman and Jay Leonhart, and Can't Take My Eyes Off You with vocalist Nicki Parrott. He can be heard on the soundtrack to the television series, The Great Chefs and the NPR broadcast Jazz Smithsonian. His Arbors album Happy All the Time is a critically acclaimed tribute to his mentor, Barney Kessel, featuring Monty Alexander and Jeff Hamilton. When Redd is Blue is a collaboration with his brother, pianist Robert Redd, featuring saxophonist Harry Allen. The Common Thread features Mickey Roker, Bob Cranshaw, Houston Person, and Rossano Sportiello.

=== As leader ===
Album title	Year	Record label
Groove City	2019	Dalphine Records
The Common Thread	2011	Arbors
When Redd is Blue	2007	Noteworthy Jazz
Chuck Redd Remembers Barney Kessel: Happy All the Time	2006	Arbors
All This and Heaven Too	2002	Arbors
Stomp, Look, and Listen	1995	Exclusive Arts

=== With others ===
- 1981 - Brazilville - The Charlie Byrd Trio w/Bud Shank (Concord)
- 1982 - Great Guitars at Charlie's Georgetown - The Great Guitars w/Charlie Byrd, Herb Ellis, Barney Kessel (Concord)
- 1982 - Latin Odyssey - w/Laurindo Almeida (Concord)
- 1984 - Isn't It Romantic? - The Charlie Byrd Trio (Concord)
- 1985 - Tango: Laurindo Almeida and Charlie Byrd - w/Laurindo Almeida and Charlie Byrd (Concord)
- 1986 - Byrd and Brass - w/The Charlie Byrd Trio and the Annapolis Brass Quintet (Concord)
- 1987 - 555 Feet High - w/Bill Potts Big Band (Jazz Mark 107 Digital)
- 1988 - It's a Wonderful World - The Charlie Byrd Trio (Concord)
- 1991 - Live! At Blues Alley - The Charlie Byrd Trio (Blues Alley Music Society)
- 1991 - The Bossa Nova Years - The Charlie Byrd Trio w/Ken Peplowski (Concord)
- 1992 - Swing Song - The Hot Mustard Jazz Band w/Buck Hill (Zest)
- 1992 - The Washington Guitar Quintet - w/Howard Aldin and Carlos Barbosa-Lima (Concord)
- 1993 - From Bessie to Brazil - w/Susannah McCorkle (Concord)
- 1994 - Fujitsu-Concord 26th Jazz Festival - Recorded live at the 26th-annual Concord Jazz Festival (Concord)
- 1994 - I've Got the World on a String - The Charlie Byrd Trio (Timeless)
- 1994 - Keep Em Flying - Brooks Tegler's Hot Jazz (Concord)
- 1994 - Moments Like This - The Charlie Byrd Trio (Concord)
- 1995 - And Not Only That - Brooks Tegler's Hot Jazz (Circle)
- 1996 - The Other Portrait - w/Ken Peplowski & The Bulgarian National Symphony (Concord)
- 1997 - A Good Reed – w/Ken Peplowski & the Loren Schoenberg Big Band (Concord)
- 1997 - Au Courant – The Charlie Byrd Trio - (Concord)
- 1997 - Big Band Treasures Live – w/The Smithsonian Jazz Masterworks Orchestra (Smithsonian Institution)
- 1998 - Grenadilla – w/Ken Peplowski & the Loren (Concord)
- 1999 - Burnin' – The Herb Ellis Trio w/Hendrik Meurkens (Acoustic Music)
- 1999 - Half-Past Swing – w/The Uptown Vocal Jazz Quartet (HouseKat)
- 1999 - My Inspiration: Music of Brazil – w/Charlie Byrd, Scott Hamilton, Maucha Adnet & Trio Da Paz (Concord)
- 1999 - Out of This World – w/Loren Schoenberg and His Jazz Orchestra (TCB)
- 1999 - The Feeling of Jazz – w/Tommy Newsom & Ken Peplowski (Arbors)
- 2000 - For Louis: A Tribute to Louis Armstrong – w/Charlie Byrd (Concord)
- 2000 - Mundell's Moods – w/Mundell Lowe & Hendrik Meurkens (Nagel-Heyer)
- 2001 - Great Guitars: Live – w/Herb Ellis, Barney Kessel, and Charlie Byrd (Concord)
- 2003 - Among Friends - w/Joe Wilder (Evening Star)
- 2004 - Big Brass Bed Blues - The Steve Abshire Quartet w/Herb Ellis (Patuxent)
- 2004 - Tribute to a Generation: A Salute to the Big Bands - w/The Smithsonian Jazz Masterworks Orchestra (Smithsonian Folkways)
- 2005 - Bound Away - w/Eric Brace (Blue Buffalo)
- 2005 - Homage to Jobim: Live at the Fujitsu-Concord 26th Jazz Festival - Recorded live at the 26th-annual Concord Jazz Festival (Concord)
- 2005 - Live at Duke's Place New Orleans 1993 - The Charlie Byrd Trio (FS World Jazz)
- 2006 - I'm All Smiles - w/Nate Najar, Steve Boisen, Duduka Da Fonseca (Blue Line)
- 2006 - Live at the Mainstay - w/Steve Abshire, Vince Lewis, & Joe Byrd (Noteworthy)
- 2007 - Christmas With the Nate Najar Trio - w/Nate Najar & John Lamb (Blue Buffalo )
- 2007 - Sassy & Bessie A-Live at the Paradise Lounge - w/Ericka Ovette & Ruby Hayes (Patuxent)
- 2008 - Vol. 1: Happy Birthday..Lionel! - Swing Masters (Dare)
- 2008 - Vol. 2: Benny...King of Swing! - Swing Masters (Dare)
- 2009 - Johnny Mercer: A Centennial Tribute - w/Daryl Sherman (Arbors)
- 2009 - Vol. 3: Gene Krupa...Jazz Pioneer! - Swing Masters (Dare)
- 2010 - Chopin in Jazz - w/Rossano Sportiello (Gangaen)
- 2011 - In Search Of - w/Ken Peplowski (Capri)
- 2011 - Mood Ebony - w/Marty Nau (Summit)
- 2011 - You're My Everything: The Music Of Harry Warren - w/Dick Hyman & Jay Leonhart (Venus)
- 2012 - Blues For Night People: The Nate Najar Trio Remembers Charlie Byrd - w/Nate Najar & Tommy Cecil (Candid)
- 2012 - Can't Take My Eyes Off You - w/Nicki Parrott (Venus)
- 2013 - Nice 'n' Easy with Houston Person (HighNote)
- 2013 - The Look of Love - w/Nicki Parrott, John Di Martino, Ken Peplowski, Lisa Parrott, Alvin Atkinson (Venus)
- 2015 - For George, Cole and Duke - w/Harry Allen, Ehud Asherie, Nicki Parrott, "Little Johnny" Rivero (Blue Heron)
- 2015 - Two Songbirds of a Feather - w/Becky Kilgore, Nicki Parrott, Mike Renzi, Harry Allen (Arbors)
- 2017 - Dear Blossom - w/Nicki Parrott, Chris Grasso, Lenny Robinson, Engelbert Wrobel, Warren Vache, Vince Cherico (Arbors)
- 2018 - Sunrise - w/The Ken Peplowski Big Band (Arbors)

=== Appearances on compilations ===
- 1997 - Irving Berlin Songbook – GRP's Priceless Jazz series (Concord)
- 1997 - Rodgers & Hart Songbook – GRP's Priceless Jazz series (Concord)
- 1997 - Swingin' Jazz for Hipsters, Vol. 1 – Concord Jazz Compilation (Concord)
- 1998 - The Concord Jazz Heritage Series – The Great Guitars Compilation (Concord)
- 1998 - The Concord Jazz Heritage Series – The Charlie Byrd Compilation (Concord)
- 1999 - Jazz After Dark, Vol. 1 (St. Claire)
- 1999 - Sunday Morning Jazz – Various Artists (St. Clair)
- 2000 - The Best of the Concord Years – Charlie Byrd Concord Compilation (Concord)
- 2002 - Plays Jobim – Charlie Byrd Jobim Compilation (Concord)
- 2002 - Ballad Essentials – w/Susannah McCorkle (Concord)
- 2002 - Nagel Heyer Artists: Jazz4Beaches: Music to Enjoy (Nagel-Heyer)
- 2003 - Concord Records 30th Anniversary (Concord)
- 2003 - Concord Records SACD Sampler, Vol. 1 (Concord)
- 2003 - Playboy Jazz After Dark – w/Charlie Byrd (Playboy Jazz)
- 2004 - Concord Jazz Sampler Vol.2 - (Concord)
- 2005 - Concord Picante 25th Anniversary Collection (Concord)
- 2006 - Playboy Jazz: Cocktail Mix - Playboy Jazz Compilation (Playboy Jazz)
- 2007 - Breathe: Relaxing Bossa (Telarc)
