= George Hannah =

George Hannah may refer to:

- George Hannah (footballer, born 1914) (1914–1977), English footballer who played for Derby County and Port Vale
- George Hannah (footballer, born 1928) (1928–1990), English footballer who played for six clubs in Ireland and England

== See also ==
- George Hanna (disambiguation)
