= The Shedd Institute =

Performing arts center in Eugene, Oregon

Coordinates: 44.0502°N 123.0885°W

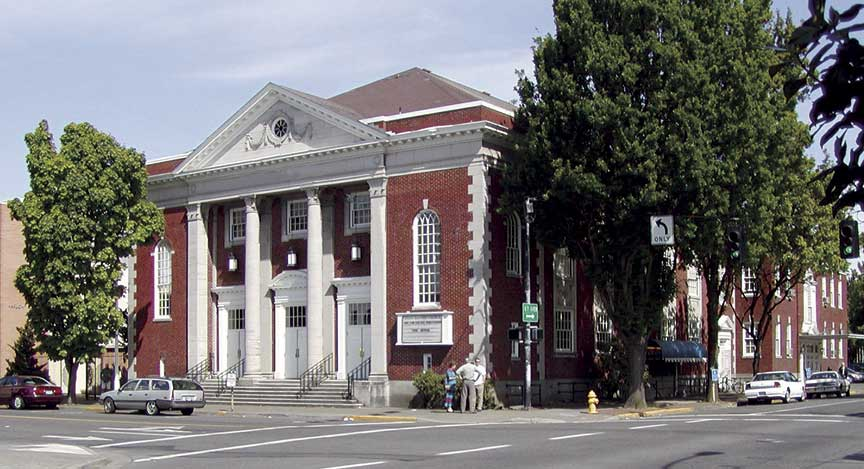
- The Shedd Institute
- Interactive map of The Shedd Institute
- Former names: First Baptist Church
- Address: 868 High St
- Location: Eugene, Oregon
- Owner: The John G. Shedd Institute for the Arts
- Capacity: Jaqua Concert Hall: 780; Sheffer Recital Hall: 175; Warren Court: 250
- Type: Performing arts center

Construction
- Built: 1926
- Renovated: 2016

Website
- theshedd.org

The John G. Shedd Institute for the Arts is a performing arts company, cultural arts center, and community music school in Eugene, Oregon, United States. The institute has three performance venues, various community meeting rooms, and extensive music education facilities. It presents annually an array of culturally diverse festivals, concert series and educational programs that focus on, but are not limited to, American music.

== History ==
The Shedd Institute was established in 1991 as a performing arts company focused on producing an annual summer orchestral pops festival dedicated to the championship of American classical music under the name Oregon Festival of American Music with American conductor Marin Alsop serving as music director and conductor. In 1993 the company was designated as a Resident Company of the Hult Center for the Performing Arts. It established a community music school in 1995.

In 1997 the company shifted from its summer-only festival model and began year-round programming with the foundation of two additional performance initiatives, The American Composers Series and The Emerald City Jazz Kings. The American Composers Series, which was under the artistic direction of conductor James Paul from 1997 to 2001, was a classical music initiative dedicated specifically to the championship of post-1900 European art music written in the Western Hemisphere. The Emerald City Jazz Kings, founded and directed by music scholar Stephen Stone, is a 16–22 member ensemble dedicated to the presentation of historic popular music from the 1910s through '60s, with an emphasis on big band jazz, swing, musical theater, and the American standard. In 1998 the company's eclectic August festival named jazz pianist and composer Dick Hyman as its jazz advisor, who joined James Paul at its artistic helm. By 2002 the company had expanded its concert producing and presenting mix with 3 new series: an expansion of its American Composers Series into a season-long series renamed The American Symphonia, a folklife festival, and Now Hear This, a genre-hopping presenting series.

At its August 2000 Oregon Festival of American Music the company presented the world premier public performance of American soprano saxophonist and composer Sidney Bechet's 1955 ballet "La colline du delta" under the baton of Festival Jazz Advisor Dick Hyman, with original choreography by The Eugene Ballet's Toni Pimble.

In July 2002 it moved into the former First Baptist Church in downtown Eugene (a 65,000-square-foot (6,000 m^{2}) complex of performance, meeting and classroom spaces), which it named "The John G. Shedd Institute for the Arts" in honor of early 20th century Chicago businessman and philanthropist John G. Shedd. In 2004 the Festival official changed its name to the name of its building. It is commonly referred to as "The Shedd Institute" while the building is known simply as "The Shedd".

== Performance series ==
The Shedd Institute's performance division currently manages 7 concert series: Oregon Festival of American Music (founded in 1992), The Emerald City Jazz Kings (founded in 1997), Shedd Classical (founded 1997), Shedd Theatricals (founded in 2002), The Magical Moombah (founded in 2001), Now Hear This cultural presenting series (founded in 2002), and Shedd Presents (founded in 2004).

== See also ==
- List of concert halls
