= Don Hanna Jr. =

American politician (1912–2005)

Member of the Nebraska Legislature from the 43rd district
- In office June 16, 1969 – January 5, 1971
- Preceded by: Elvin Adamson
- Succeeded by: Otho Kime

Personal details
- Born: December 30, 1912 Cherry County, Nebraska
- Died: January 22, 2005 (aged 92) Valentine, Nebraska
- Party: Republican
- Spouse: Claire E. Frink (m. 1934)
- Children: 3 (Don, James, Barbara)
- Relatives: Don Hanna (father)
- Education: Hastings College
- Occupation: Stockman, rancher

Don E. Hanna Jr. (December 30, 1912 – January 22, 2005) was a Republican politician from Nebraska who served as a member of the Nebraska Legislature from the 43rd district from 1969 to 1971.

== Early life ==
Hanna was born in Cherry County, Nebraska, in 1912, and graduated from Thomas County High School. He attended Hastings College, and settled in Brownlee, where he engaged in livestock ranching and served n the Brownlee School Board. In 1954, his father, Don Hanna, a former state senator and member of the Nebraska Highway Commission, died, and Hanna was appointed to serve out the remainder of his father's term. He resigned in 1956. Hanna was active in the Nebraska Republican Party, and was one of Republican Governor Norbert Tiemann's "most loyal supporters" in western Nebraska.

== Nebraska Legislature ==
In 1969, State Senator Elvin Adamson, the former Speaker of the Legislature]], resigned to serve in the U.S. Department of Agriculture as deputy assistant secretary for marketing and consumer affairs. Governor Tiemann appointed Hanna to serve until a 1970 special election could be held, and he was sworn in on June 16, 1969.

Hanna ran in the 1970 special election to serve out the remaining two years of Adamson's term. He was initially unopposed, but two days prior to the primary election, former Cherry County Sheriff Otho Kime, who had been living in St. Francis, South Dakota, announced that he would challenge Hanna as a write-in candidate. Hanna placed first in the primary election, winning 66 percent of the vote, but Kime received 1,824 votes, 34 percent of the vote in total, enough to win a place on the general election ballot. Hanna ultimately lost to Kime by a wide margin, receiving just 38 percent of the vote to Kime's 62 percent.

== Death ==
Hanna died on January 22, 2005.
