= Lloyd Wells =

American jazz guitarist, composer and arranger

- Born: April 22, 1938 (age 87); Laurel, Mississippi, U.S.
- Genres: Jazz
- Occupation: Musician
- Instrument: Guitar

Lloyd Wells is an American jazz guitarist, composer and arranger.

== Music career ==
He grew up in Laurel, Mississippi, the home town of jazz guitarist, Mundell Lowe. He did his first professional work playing for square dances while still attending high school. He attended the University of Southern Mississippi, graduating with a degree in Music Education.

With encouragement from Lowe, Wells spent the years 1964–73 in New York as a working guitarist. He moved to Nashville in 1974 and for seventeen years accompanied Tennessee Ernie Ford. He also worked with Brenda Lee and Porter Wagoner. For twenty-three years, he was music director of Opryland USA, where he wrote over five thousand arrangements.
