= Hanna Abu-Hanna =

Palestinian writer (1928–2022)

- Born: 16 October 1928; Reineh, Mandatory Palestine
- Died: 2 February 2022 (aged 93)
- Known for: poetry and writing

Hanna Abu-Hanna (16 October 1928 – 2 February 2022) was a Palestinian writer, poet, and researcher. He was born in Reineh, Mandatory Palestine on October 16, 1928. He belongs to the first generation of Arab resistance poets in Israel. Hanna worked as Director of the Arab Orthodox College in Haifa until 1987. He was also a lecturer at the University of Haifa and at the Teacher Education College in 1973. Abu-Hanna earned a Master's degree in literature. He edited and prepared student programs in Jerusalem and Near East radio stations. He participated in the publication of the Al-Jadeed magazine in 1951, the Al-Ghad magazine in 1953, Al-Mawakib in 1984, and Al-Mawqaf in 1993.

== Early life ==
Abu-Hanna was born in 1928 in Reineh, a town 3 km north of Nazareth. Because of his father's work, he moved between Jerusalem, Ramallah, Jaffa, Ashdod, Najd, Haifa, Nazareth, and then back to Reineh. He first attended school in Ashdod, after which he attended the Al Maaref School for Boys in Haifa. He then moved to Nazareth, where he participated in the 1936 Arab revolt. He later attended the Latin School in Reineh for a while, before completing secondary studies at the Ma'arif School in Nazareth.

After high school, Abu-Hanna studied at the Arab College in Jerusalem, which enrolled outstanding students from Palestinian government schools. He was chosen to pursue studies in Britain. A government mission was assigned to him in 1947, but family circumstances and the Nakba eliminated this opportunity. He held a BA in English Literature from the University of Haifa.

== Career ==
After the Nakba, Abu-Hanna returned to Haifa in 1950, where he worked for the editorial board of the Al-Ittihad with Tawfik Toubi, Emile Habibi, Emile Touma, Saliba Khamis, Muhammad Khas, Ali Ashour, and Jabra Nicola. He helped to establish the Al-Ghad and Al-Jadeed magazines, which were issued in 1951 as a supplement to Al-Ittihad and then resumed publishing in 1953 after obtaining a license. Israeli authorities imprisoned him in Ramle Prison in 1958.

== Personal life and death ==
Abu-Hanna married Samia Farah, who was from Shefa-Amr. The couple had two daughters, Rabab Abu-Hanna and journalist Umayya Abu-Hanna, and a son, professor Amin Abu-Hanna. He died on 2 February 2022, at the age of 93.

== Notable works ==
=== Poetry ===
- The Call of the Surgeon (Amman Library, 1969).
- Poems from the Garden of Patience (Akko, 1988).
- I swallowed your poison until reaching immunity (Haifa, 1990).

=== Hanna studies ===
- The World of the Short Story (Carmel Press, Haifa, 1979)
- My Soul on My Comfort: The Divan of Abd al-Rahim Mahmoud (Center for the Revival of Arab Heritage, Taybeh, 1985 AD)
- The Russian Teachers' House (in Nazareth, 1994)
- A journey in search of heritage (Haifa, 1994)
- Epic Literature
- Palestinian Poetry divan

Publications
Title	Author	Contribution	Notes	Year
Red Green	Hanna Abu-Hanna	Drawings: Sawsan Al Majidi		2001
Epic literature	Hanna Abu-Hanna			1983
Arnoub and Farfour	Hanna Abu-Hanna	Drawing Sawsan Al Majidi.		2001
Dima’s fingers	Hanna Abu-Hanna	Drawings: Sawsan Al Majidi		2001
Green Leaves	Hanna Abu-Hanna			2004
I drank your poison until reaching immunity: Poetry	Hanna Abu-Hanna			1990
Three poets: Ibrahim Tuqan, Abdul Rahim Mahmoud, Abu Salma	Hanna Abu-Hanna			1995
Juha and the Moon	Hanna Abu-Hanna	Drawings: Louay Dokhi		2003
Ash Yeast: A Biography	Hanna Abu-Hanna			2004
Palestinian Poetry divan	Hanna Abu-Hanna			1991
A journey in search of heritage	Hanna Abu-Hanna			1994
Secret of King Kessar	Hanna Abu-Hanna	Drawings: Sawsan Al Majidi.		2002
Shadow of the Cloud: A Biography	Hanna Abu-Hanna			2001
The world of the short story			prepared and presented Hanna Abu-Hanna	1979
The Fortune teller of Carmel: Poetry	Hanna Abu-Hanna			2005
Literary pistachio	Hanna Abu-Hanna			2004
Poems from the Garden of Patience	Hanna Abu-Hanna			1988
My cat is Princess	Hanna Abu-Hanna	Drawings: Sawsan Al Majidi		2001
King of the Jungle	Hanna Abu-Hanna	Drawings: Raad Abdul Wahid		2016
Among the problems of education in the Arab sector	Hanna Abu-Hanna [and] Sami Geraisy			1977
The Owl's Pony: A Biography	Hanna Abu-Hanna			2004
