= Don Hanna =

American politician (1887–1954)

Member of the Nebraska Legislature from the 40th district
- In office January 4, 1949 – January 2, 1951
- Preceded by: Joe Leedom
- Succeeded by: Jay Cole
- In office January 7, 1941 – January 7, 1947
- Preceded by: George Gross
- Succeeded by: Joe Leedom

Personal details
- Born: March 3, 1887 Blaine County, Nebraska
- Died: February 10, 1954 (aged 66) Lincoln, Nebraska
- Party: Republican
- Spouse: Wynona Severance (m. 1911)
- Children: 3 (including Don Jr.)
- Occupation: Cattle rancher

Don E. Hanna Sr. (March 3, 1887 – February 10, 1954) was a Republican politician from Nebraska who served as a member of the Nebraska Legislature from the 40th district from 1941 to 1947 and again from 1949 to 1951.

== Early life ==
Hanna was born in Blaine County, Nebraska, in 1887, and grew up in Cherry County, graduating from Mullen High School. He operated a ranch with his father beginning in 1908, and started his own ranch in 1915, and worked a bronc rider.

In 1930, Hanna ran for the Cherry County Commission from the 2nd district. He won the Republican primary unopposed, and faced incumbent Democratic Commissioner F. L. Boyer in the general election. Hanna defeated Boyer by a wide margin. He ran for re-election in 1934, and defeated J. M. McIntosh in the Republican primary. In the general election, he faced a rematch with Boyer, and ultimately won re-election. Hanna declined to seek re-election in 1938.

== Nebraska Legislature ==
In 1940, State Senator George Gross declined to seek re-election to a second term, and Hanna ran to succeed him in the 40th district, which included Brown, Cherry, and Sheridan counties. In the nonpartisan primary, he faced former State Representative H. C. Sorensen, former State Senator Allen Strong, and druggist George Strelow. Hanna narrowly placed first in the primary, winning 33 percent of the vote to Strong's 31 percent, Strelow's 21 percent, and Sorensen's 15 percent. Hanna and Strong advanced to the general election. However, several weeks prior to the election, Strong dropped out of the race, citing "circumstances that have arisen since the Primary" that would make it impossible for him to serve. Strong's name remained on the ballot, and Hanna won the election in a landslide, receiving 66 percent of the vote.

Hanna was re-elected without opposition in 1942 and 1944. In 1946, Hanna declined to seek re-election, observing, "It is my belief that officials, both state and national, who seek to perpetuate themselves in office are the greatest menace to democracy[.]" He was succeeded by Joe Leedom.

In 1948, after he retired from managing his ranch, Hanna filed to run for the legislature again. Hanna was originally set to face Leedom, as well as rancher Thomas Quinn, in the nonpartisan primary, but prior to the primary, Leedom announced his "complete withdrawal from politics" and dropped out of the race. Hanna placed first in the primary over Quinn by a large margin, winning 60 percent of the vote to Quinn's 40 percent. In the general election, Hanna defeated Quinn by a narrow margin, receiving 51 percent of the vote to Quinn's 49 percent. Prior to tabulating mail ballots, Hanna led Quinn by 113 votes, and Quinn indicated that he would contest the election if Hanna's lead was reduced. Hanna ultimately won over Quinn by 191 votes, and Quinn did not contest the result. Hanna did not seek re-election in 1950.

== Post-legislative career ==
In 1953, Hanna was appointed to the Nebraska Highway Commission by Governor Robert B. Crosby.

== Death ==
Hanna died on February 10, 1954, in Lincoln, Nebraska, while attending a meeting of the Nebraska Highway Commission.
