= Electoral results for the Division of Lingiari =

Division election results

This is a list of electoral results for the Division of Lingiari in Australian federal elections from the division's creation in 2001 until the present.

== Members ==
Member	Party	Term
Marion Scrymgour	Labor	2022–present
Warren Snowdon	Labor	2001–2022

== Election results ==
=== Elections in the 2020s ===
==== 2025 ====
2025 Australian federal election: Lingiari
Party	Candidate	Votes	%	±%
Labor	Marion Scrymgour	20,372	44.64	+7.39
Country Liberal	Lisa Siebert	14,143	30.99	−3.48
Greens	Blair McFarland	4,646	10.18	−0.84
One Nation	Sakellarios Bairamis	4,132	9.06	+3.77
Indigenous-Aboriginal	Chris Tomlins	1,317	2.89	+2.89
Citizens	Peter Flynn	1,022	2.24	+1.18
Total formal votes		45,632	95.49	+2.95
Informal votes		2,157	4.51	−2.95
Turnout		47,789	62.21	+1.79
Two-candidate-preferred result
Labor	Marion Scrymgour	26,524	58.13	+6.53
Country Liberal	Lisa Siebert	19,108	41.87	−6.53
Labor hold		Swing	+6.53	

==== 2022 ====
2022 Australian federal election: Lingiari
Party	Candidate	Votes	%	±%
Labor	Marion Scrymgour	16,747	36.56	−8.24
Country Liberal	Damien Ryan	15,893	34.69	−2.22
Greens	Blair McFarland	5,018	10.95	+2.71
One Nation	Tim Gallard	2,470	5.39	+5.39
Liberal Democrats	George Kasparek	1,948	4.25	+4.25
United Australia	Allan McLeod	1,882	4.11	+1.29
Independent	Michael Gravener	948	2.07	+2.07
Citizens	Thong Sum Lee	497	1.08	+1.08
Independent	Imelda Adamson Agars	409	0.89	+0.89
Total formal votes		45,812	92.63	−2.32
Informal votes		3,647	7.37	+2.32
Turnout		49,459	66.83	−6.02
Two-party-preferred result
Labor	Marion Scrymgour	23,339	50.95	−4.51
Country Liberal	Damien Ryan	22,473	49.05	+4.51
Labor hold		Swing	−4.51	

Alluvial diagram for preference flows in the seat of Lingiari in the 2022 federal election. indicates at what stage the winning candidate had over 50% of the votes and was declared the winner.

=== Elections in the 2010s ===
==== 2019 ====
2019 Australian federal election: Lingiari
Party	Candidate	Votes	%	±%
Labor	Warren Snowdon	21,698	44.80	+5.04
Country Liberal	Jacinta Price	17,875	36.91	+5.03
Greens	George Hanna	3,991	8.24	+0.50
Independent	Hamish MacFarlane	2,123	4.38	+4.38
Rise Up Australia	Regina McCarthy	1,380	2.85	−0.57
United Australia	Daniel Hodgson	1,367	2.82	+2.82
Total formal votes		48,434	94.95	+2.75
Informal votes		2,575	5.05	−2.75
Turnout		51,009	72.85	−1.11
Two-party-preferred result
Labor	Warren Snowdon	26,863	55.46	−2.73
Country Liberal	Jacinta Price	21,571	44.54	+2.73
Labor hold		Swing	−2.73	

==== 2016 ====
2016 Australian federal election: Lingiari
Party	Candidate	Votes	%	±%
Labor	Warren Snowdon	17,056	39.78	+0.03
Country Liberal	Tina MacFarlane	13,605	31.73	−6.50
Greens	Rob Hoad	3,305	7.71	−0.05
Shooters, Fishers, Farmers	Chris Righton	3,061	7.14	+7.14
Independent	Yingiya Mark Guyula	1,854	4.32	+4.32
Independent	Braedon Earley	1,808	4.22	+4.22
Rise Up Australia	Regina McCarthy	1,498	3.49	+1.50
Independent	Alfred Gould	427	1.00	−0.63
Citizens Electoral Council	Peter Flynn	261	0.61	−2.95
Total formal votes		42,875	92.15	−0.42
Informal votes		3,650	7.85	+0.42
Turnout		46,525	73.70	−1.72
Two-party-preferred result
Labor	Warren Snowdon	25,048	58.42	+7.54
Country Liberal	Tina MacFarlane	17,827	41.58	−7.54
Labor hold		Swing	+7.54	

==== 2013 ====
2013 Australian federal election: Lingiari
Party	Candidate	Votes	%	±%
Labor	Warren Snowdon	18,292	39.75	−0.33
Country Liberal	Tina MacFarlane	17,593	38.23	+3.97
Greens	Barbara Shaw	3,572	7.76	−4.83
Palmer United	Trevor Hedland	1,918	4.17	+4.17
Citizens Electoral Council	Peter Flynn	1,639	3.56	−0.31
First Nations	Kenneth Lechleitner	1,340	2.91	+2.91
Rise Up Australia	Regina McCarthy	917	1.99	+1.99
Independent	Alf Gould	748	1.63	+1.63
Total formal votes		46,019	92.57	+0.07
Informal votes		3,696	7.43	−0.07
Turnout		49,715	75.40	−0.47
Two-party-preferred result
Labor	Warren Snowdon	23,413	50.88	−2.82
Country Liberal	Tina MacFarlane	22,606	49.12	+2.82
Labor hold		Swing	−2.82	

==== 2010 ====
2010 Australian federal election: Lingiari
Party	Candidate	Votes	%	±%
Labor	Warren Snowdon	17,205	40.08	−13.91
Country Liberal	Leo Abbott	14,708	34.26	−0.40
Greens	Barbara Shaw	5,403	12.59	+5.67
Independent	Deirdre Finter	2,038	4.75	+4.75
First Nations	Kenny Lechleitner	1,910	4.45	+4.45
Citizens Electoral Council	Peter Flynn	1,663	3.87	+3.87
Total formal votes		42,927	92.50	−2.65
Informal votes		3,482	7.50	+2.65
Turnout		46,409	75.92	−5.34
Two-party-preferred result
Labor	Warren Snowdon	23,051	53.70	−7.46
Country Liberal	Leo Abbott	19,876	46.30	+7.46
Labor hold		Swing	−7.46	

=== Elections in the 2000s ===
==== 2007 ====
2007 Australian federal election: Lingiari
Party	Candidate	Votes	%	±%
Labor	Warren Snowdon	25,213	53.99	+3.33
Country Liberal	Adam Giles	16,189	34.66	−3.70
Greens	Emma Young	3,231	6.92	+1.34
Independent	Maurie Ryan	1,206	2.58	+2.58
Independent	Wayne Wright	864	1.85	+1.85
Total formal votes		46,703	95.15	+0.09
Informal votes		2,381	4.85	−0.09
Turnout		49,084	81.34	+3.63
Two-party-preferred result
Labor	Warren Snowdon	28,565	61.16	+3.50
Country Liberal	Adam Giles	18,138	38.84	−3.50
Labor hold		Swing	+3.50	

==== 2004 ====
2004 Australian federal election: Lingiari
Party	Candidate	Votes	%	±%
Labor	Warren Snowdon	21,782	50.66	+2.83
Country Liberal	Maisie Austin	16,494	38.36	−0.82
Greens	James Bristow	2,400	5.58	+2.78
Democrats	David Curtis	1,260	2.93	−2.13
Independent	Andrew Mills	1,063	2.47	+2.47
Total formal votes		42,999	95.06	−0.07
Informal votes		2,235	4.94	+0.07
Turnout		45,234	77.71	−2.84
Two-party-preferred result
Labor	Warren Snowdon	24,795	57.66	+2.37
Country Liberal	Maisie Austin	18,204	42.32	−2.37
Labor hold		Swing	+2.37	

==== 2001 ====
2001 Australian federal election: Lingiari
Party	Candidate	Votes	%	±%
Labor	Warren Snowdon	20,916	47.83	+1.60
Country Liberal	Ron Kelly	17,133	39.18	+2.81
Democrats	Linda Chellew	2,213	5.06	−0.06
One Nation	Wayne Norris	1,817	4.15	−3.83
Greens	Rob Hoad	1,226	2.80	+0.19
	Wayne Wright	428	0.98	+0.98
Total formal votes		43,733	95.13	−0.10
Informal votes		2,240	4.87	+0.10
Turnout		45,973	80.94	
Two-party-preferred result
Labor	Warren Snowdon	24,182	55.29	+1.76
Country Liberal	Ron Kelly	19,551	44.71	−1.76
Labor notional hold		Swing	+1.76	
