= Ken Watters =

American musician

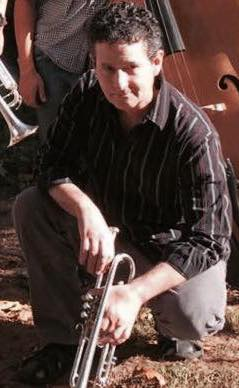
- Ken Watters, director of the Huntsville Citywide Jazz Combo.

Background information
- Born: Kenneth Watters; July 6, 1964
- Genres: Jazz, World Music
- Occupations: Musician, Composer, Jazz Ensemble Director at University of Alabama in Huntsville
- Instruments: Trumpet, Flugelhorn
- Formerly of: RIYEL, Tabou Combo, Watters/Felts Project, W.C. Handy Jazz Allstars
- Website: www.xo-brass.eu/en/musicians/ken-watters.html

Ken Watters is an American jazz trumpeter residing in Huntsville, Alabama. He is the brother of noted jazz trombonist, Harry Watters. Ken has performed and/or recorded with Frank Sinatra, Tabou Combo, , Jason Isbell, Marc Anthony, Wyclef Jean, Natalie Cole , Mingus Big Band, Ray_Reach, Billy Ray Cyrus, Chris Potter Cee-Lo, Brad Mehldau, the Vanguard Orchestra, and a host of other luminaries of the music world. He attended the University of North Texas, where he participated in the famed Lab Band program and studied trumpet with internationally renowned teacher Leonard Candelaria. Later, Ken pursued further trumpet studies at Manhattan School of Music in New York City, where he also studied with Lew Soloff, Joe Lovano, Jack Walrath and Wynton Marsalis.

Ken's most recent CD release was by his own Haitian-Caribbean influenced jazz septet, RIYEL. The group's self-titled debut CD was released internationally on Summit Records & climbed to #2 on the JazzWeek World Music Charts. His latest musical project is an ongoing venture co-led alongside vocalist Ingrid Felts, called "Watters-Felts Project.” The jazz-oriented sextet, based in Huntsville, Alabama, is made up of six of the most in-demand musicians in the southeast, including pianist Keith Taylor, bassist Abe Becker, percussionist Darrell Tibbs, drummer Marcus Pope, plus Felts & Watters. Ken is currently an adjunct professor at University of Alabama in Huntsville, where he directs the UAH Jazz Ensemble I.

== Discography ==
- The Jungle (1986)
- Brothers* (1999)
- Brothers II* (2000)
- Southern Exposure (2001)
- Brothers III* (2003)
- RIYEL (2010)
