= The Essential Janis Joplin =

Greatest hits album by Janis Joplin
- Released: January 14, 2003
- Recorded: 1966–1970
- Genre: Blues
- Length: 120:43
- Label: Columbia

Janis Joplin chronology
Love, Janis (2001)	The Essential Janis Joplin (2003)	The Lost Tapes (2008)

The Essential Janis Joplin is a 2003 compilation album by the American blues singer Janis Joplin released on Columbia Records. In 2008, a special edition version of the album was released with a third disc featuring 6 additional tracks.

== Reception ==
Professional ratings
Review scores
Source	Rating
AllMusic	4.5/5 stars
The Encyclopedia of Popular Music	4/5 stars
Pittsburgh Post-Gazette	3.5/5 stars
Rolling Stone	4/5 stars
Uncut	1.5/5 stars

The Essential Janis Joplin was mostly well received, with critics calling it an excellent overview of Joplin's music. AllMusic critic Richie Unterberger stated it has "all the songs fans and critics would consider milestones in [Joplin's] career", believing the substitution of substitutions of lesser known music by Joplin "might rankle some consumers expecting to hear the most common ones".

Writing for Rolling Stone, Barry Walters notes it is "accurately named and better than other, similarly titled compilations", concluding it "gets the balance right for everyone but collectors and completists". Writing for PopMatters, their staff believed it is "presumably for listeners who want more than a single disc of Janis but not more than two". The staff of Billboard states "Assembled here are blazing live cuts [...] and canonized classics", believing that "This is the sound of rock'n'roll's immortal pulse." Ben Windham of the Tuscaloosa News writes that "Fewer than a handful of songs of "The Essential Janis Joplin are blues, properly speaking", noting that "the collection's eye opener[ is] a cover of the Bee Gees' "To Love Somebody"."

== Track listing ==
Disc one
No.	Title	Original album	Length
1.	"Down on Me"	Big Brother & the Holding Company, 1967	2:06
2.	"Coo Coo"	Big Brother & the Holding Company (1970 Columbia Records release)	1:58
3.	"Women is Losers"	Big Brother & the Holding Company	2:04
4.	"Bye, Bye, Baby"	Big Brother & the Holding Company	2:38
5.	"Ball and Chain" (live)	Cheap Thrills, 1968	8:04
6.	"Roadblock"	Cheap Thrills re-release	5:32
7.	"Piece of My Heart"	Cheap Thrills	4:15
8.	"Misery'n"	Previously unreleased	4:10
9.	"I Need a Man to Love"	Cheap Thrills	4:53
10.	"Summertime"	Cheap Thrills	3:59
11.	"Flower in the Sun" (live)	In Concert, 1972	3:11
12.	"Farewell Song" (live)	Farewell Song, 1982	4:58
13.	"Raise Your Hand" (live)	Janis, 1993	2:27
14.	"To Love Somebody" (live)	Previously unreleased	5:14
15.	"Kozmic Blues" (live)	Live version previously unreleased, original version on I Got Dem Ol' Kozmic Blues Again Mama!, 1969	5:05

Disc two
No.	Title	Original album	Length
1.	"Try (Just a Little Bit Harder)"	I Got Dem Ol' Kozmic Blues Again Mama!	3:57
2.	"Maybe"	I Got Dem Ol' Kozmic Blues Again Mama!	3:40
3.	"One Good Man"	I Got Dem Ol' Kozmic Blues Again Mama!	4:10
4.	"Little Girl Blue"	I Got Dem Ol' Kozmic Blues Again Mama!	3:50
5.	"Work Me, Lord"	I Got Dem Ol' Kozmic Blues Again Mama!	6:37
6.	"Tell Mama" (live)	Farewell Song	6:39
7.	"Move Over"	Pearl, 1971	3:41
8.	"Cry Baby"	Pearl	3:57
9.	"A Woman Left Lonely"	Pearl	3:28
10.	"Half Moon"	Pearl	3:52
11.	"My Baby"	Pearl	3:44
12.	"Me and Bobby McGee"	Pearl	4:30
13.	"Mercedes Benz"	Pearl	1:47
14.	"Trust Me"	Pearl	3:16
15.	"Get It While You Can"	Pearl	3:25
16.	"Mercedes Benz" (Janis Joplin vs. Medicine Head remix)	Previously unreleased remix, original version on Pearl	3:45
Total length:			2:00:43

Disc three (3.0 special edition only)
No.	Title	Original album	Length
1.	"Call On Me"	Big Brother & the Holding Company	2:32
2.	"Combination of the Two"	Big Brother & the Holding Company (1970 Columbia Records release)	5:47
3.	"Turtle Blues"	Cheap Thrills	4:20
4.	"Catch Me Daddy" (live)	Farewell Song	5:45
5.	"As Good As You Been to This World"	I Got Dem Ol' Kozmic Blues Again Mama!	5:25
6.	"Dear Landlord"	I Got Dem Ol' Kozmic Blues Again Mama! (1999 CD reissue bonus track)	2:31

== Charts ==
Chart performance for The Essential Janis Joplin
Chart (2003–2016)	Peak position
Dutch Albums (Album Top 100)	100
French Albums (SNEP)	181
Italian Albums (FIMI)	32
Norwegian Albums (VG-lista)	15
Swiss Albums (Schweizer Hitparade)	25
UK Jazz & Blues Albums (Official Charts)	9
