= The Pearl Sessions =

Compilation album by Janis Joplin
- Released: 2012
- Recorded: September 5 – October 3, 1970
- Genres: Blues rock, country rock, funk rock
- Length: 2:13:31
- Label: Columbia

Janis Joplin chronology
Blow All My Blues Away (2012)	The Pearl Sessions (2012)

Professional ratings
Review scores
Source	Rating
AllMusic	4.5/5 stars

The Pearl Sessions is a compilation album by Janis Joplin released in 2012. It contains alternate takes of the songs that constituted the album Pearl posthumously released by Columbia Records in 1971. Recordings of Joplin and producer Paul Rothchild talking between takes give the listener insight into their creative musical process.

== Track listing ==
Disc 1
No.	Title	Writer(s)	Length
1.	"Move Over"	Janis Joplin	3:43
2.	"Cry Baby"	Jerry Ragovoy, Bert Berns	3:58
3.	"A Woman Left Lonely"	Dan Penn, Spooner Oldham	3:29
4.	"Half Moon"	John Hall, Johanna Hall	3:53
5.	"Buried Alive in the Blues"	Nick Gravenites	2:27
6.	"My Baby"	Jerry Ragovoy, Mort Shuman	3:45
7.	"Me and Bobby McGee"	Kris Kristofferson, Fred Foster	4:31
8.	"Mercedes Benz"	Janis Joplin, Bob Neuwirth, Michael McClure	1:47
9.	"Trust Me"	Bobby Womack	3:17
10.	"Get It While You Can"	Jerry Ragovoy, Mort Shuman	3:28

Bonus tracks: The Mono Single Masters
No.	Title	Writer(s)	Length
11.	"Me and Bobby McGee" (mono version)	Kristofferson, Foster	4:11
12.	"Half Moon" (mono version)	John Hall, Johanna Hall	3:56
13.	"Cry Baby" (mono version)	Ragovoy, Berns	4:00
14.	"Get It While You Can" (mono version)	Jerry Ragovoy, Mort Shuman	3:29
15.	"Move Over" (mono version)	Janis Joplin	3:42
16.	"A Woman Left Lonely" (mono version)	Spooner Oldham	4:48

Disc 2
No.	Title	Writer(s)	Length
1.	"Overheard in the Studio..."		0:40
2.	"Get It While You Can" (Take 3: 7.27.70)	Mort Shuman	3:39
3.	"Overheard in the Studio..."		1:39
4.	"Get It While You Can" (Take 5: 7.27.70)	Mort Shuman	3:46
5.	"Overheard in the Studio..."		2:30
6.	"Move Over" (Take 6: 7.27.70)	Janis Joplin	4:06
7.	"Move Over" (Take 13: 7.28.70)	Janis Joplin	4:38
8.	"Move Over" (Take 17: 7.28.70)	Janis Joplin	4:08
9.	"Me and Bobby McGee" (Demo Version 7.28.70)	Fred Foster, Kris Kristofferson	4:48
10.	"Me and Bobby McGee" (Take 5: Alternate: 7.28.70)	Fred Foster, Kris Kristofferson	4:51
11.	"Cry Baby" (Alternate Version 9.5.70)	Jerry Ragovoy, Bert Berns	4:59
12.	"A Woman Left Lonely" (Alternate Vocal 9.9.70)	Spooner Oldham	3:36
13.	"Overheard in the Studio..."		2:28
14.	"My Baby" (Alternate Take 9.9.70)	Mort Shuman	3:56
15.	"Overheard in the Studio..."		2:54
16.	"Get It While You Can" (Take 3: 9.11.70)	Mort Shuman	3:33
17.	"My Baby" (Alternate Take 9.24.70)	Mort Shuman	4:00
18.	"Pearl" (Instrumental 10.10.70)	Full Tilt Boogie Band	4:31

Bonus tracks
No.	Title	Writer(s)	Length
19.	"Tell Mama" (Live 7.28.70)	Marcus Daniel	6:38
20.	"Half Moon" (Live 8.3.70 from "The Dick Cavett Show")	John Hall, Johanna Hall	4:07

== Personnel ==
- Janis Joplin – vocals, guitar on "Me and Bobby McGee"
- Richard Bell – piano
- Ken Pearson – organ
- John Till – electric guitar
- Brad Campbell – bass guitar
- Clark Pierson – drums

=== Additional personnel ===
- Bobby Womack – acoustic guitar on "Trust Me"
- Bobbye Hall – conga, percussion
- Phil Badella, John Cooke, Vince Mitchell – backing vocals
- Sandra Crouch – tambourine
- Phil Macy – engineer
- Vic Anesini – mastering
