= Janis Joplin's Greatest Hits =

Greatest hits album by Janis Joplin
- Released: June 1973
- Recorded: 1966–1970
- Length: 47:16
- Label: Columbia

Janis Joplin chronology
In Concert (1972)	Janis Joplin's Greatest Hits (1973)	Janis (1975)

Professional ratings
Review scores
Source	Rating
Allmusic	4.5/5 stars
Christgau's Record Guide	A

Janis Joplin's Greatest Hits is a 1973 collection of hit songs by American singer-songwriter Janis Joplin, who died in 1970. It features live versions of Down on Me and Ball and Chain which were included on the album In Concert the previous year.

The cover photo was taken at Eden Park, Cincinnati, Ohio in June 1970.

== Track listing ==
1. "Piece of My Heart" (Bert Berns, Jerry Ragovoy) from Cheap Thrills – 4:14
2. "Summertime" (George Gershwin, Ira Gershwin, Dubose Heyward) from Cheap Thrills – 4:02
3. "Try (Just a Little Bit Harder)" (Ragovoy, Chip Taylor) from I Got Dem Ol' Kozmic Blues Again Mama! – 3:57
4. "Cry Baby" (Berns, Ragovoy) from Pearl – 4:00
5. "Me and Bobby McGee" (Fred Foster, Kris Kristofferson) from Pearl – 4:31
6. "Down on Me" (Janis Joplin) from In Concert – 3:09
7. "Get It While You Can" (Ragovoy, Mort Shuman) from Pearl – 3:27
8. "Bye, Bye Baby" (Powell St. John) from Big Brother & the Holding Company – 2:37
9. "Move Over" (Joplin) from Pearl – 3:44
10. "Ball and Chain" (Big Mama Thornton) from In Concert – 7:59

=== Bonus tracks on 1999 remastered reissue ===
11. "Maybe" (Richard Barrett) from I Got Dem Ol' Kozmic Blues Again Mama! – 3:39
12. "Mercedes Benz" (Janis Joplin, Michael McClure, Bob Neuwirth) from Pearl – 1:45

== Sales and certifications ==
Region	Certification	Certified units/sales
Austria (IFPI Austria)	Platinum	50,000^{*}
Canada (Music Canada)	Platinum	100,000^{^}
Italy (FIMI)	Platinum	50,000^{*}
Switzerland (IFPI Switzerland)	Gold	25,000^{^}
United Kingdom (BPI)	Gold	100,000^{*}
United States (RIAA)	9× Platinum	9,000,000^{‡}
^{*} Sales figures based on certification alone.^{^} Shipments figures based on certification alone.^{‡} Sales+streaming figures based on certification alone.
