= Wicked Woman (album) =

Live album by Janis Joplin and her Full Tilt Boogie Band
- Released: 1976
- Recorded: August 12, 1970
- Genre: Rock, blues rock
- Label: Memory Records

Janis Joplin and her Full Tilt Boogie Band chronology
Janis (1975)	Wicked Woman (1976)	Anthology (1980)

Wicked Woman is a live bootleg recording of Janis Joplin's final concert before her death less than two months later. The recordings were made by members of the audience.

The performance of Janis Joplin and her Full Tilt Boogie Band took place in Harvard Stadium among an audience of approximately 40,000. For the performance, the band utilized loaned amplifiers after their own were stolen while in Boston. Despite the setback, Joplin is still noted for giving a soulful performance.

Three tracks, "Half Moon", "Mercedes Benz", and "My Baby" would be a part of Joplin's final studio album, Pearl. It would be released January 11, 1971.

== Track listing ==
1. "Intro"
2. "Tell Mama"
3. "Half Moon"
4. "Mercedes Benz"
5. "My Baby"
6. "Try (Just a Little Bit Harder)"
7. "Maybe"
8. "Summertime"
9. "Full Tilt"
