= Love, Janis =

Compilation album by Janis Joplin
- Released: 2001
- Genre: Rock
- Length: 44:42
- Label: Columbia
- Producers: Bob Irwin; Steve Berkowitz; Mike Berniker

Love, Janis is a 2001 collection of Janis Joplin's performances interspersed with readings of her personal letters to her family throughout her career. It is a companion to the Off-Broadway musical of the same title (conceived, adapted and directed by Randal Myler) and the book by Joplin's sister Laura.

The text of Joplin's letters are read by Catherine Curtin who was the on-stage reader Janis in the 2001 Off-Broadway version of the musical. The music on the album is the original songs sung by Joplin and the various bands she was a part of. Billboard's review of the show said that this combination was more effective than the live singer used in the musical itself.

== Track listing ==
1. "What Good Can Drinkin' Do" - 2:49
2. "I bring the news" (reading) - 2:43
3. "Down On Me" - 2:04
4. "I'm somebody important" (reading) - 1.39
5. "Women Is Losers" - 2:03
6. "Our first record is finally out" (reading) - 1:11
7. "Piece of My Heart" - 4:14
8. "I'm sorry, sorry" (reading) - 0:52
9. "A happening" (reading) - 2:01
10. "Summertime" - 3:58
11. "He's a Beatle, Mother" (reading) - 1:35
12. "Ball and Chain" - 9:26
13. "I may just be a star someday" (reading) - 2:01
14. "A Woman Left Lonely" - 3:27
15. "Twenty-Five" (reading) - 1:29
16. "Try (Just a Little Bit Harder)" - 3:56
17. "Did I tell you about my reviews?" (reading) - 1:07
18. "Little Girl Blue" - 3:48
19. "Twenty-Seven" (reading) - 2:18
20. "Me and Bobby McGee" - 4:29
21. "Mercedes Benz" - 2:13
22. "The Last Letter: Really rushin' through" (reading) - 1:44
23. "Get It While You Can" - 3:23
