= Wicked Woman =

Wicked Woman may refer to:

- A Wicked Woman, a 1934 film
- Wicked Woman (film), a 1953 film
- Wicked Woman (album), a bootleg recording of Janis Joplin's last concert, 1970

== See also ==
- Wicked Women, a collection of short stories by Fay Weldon
- Wicked Women, an Australian lesbian magazine published from 1988 to 1996
- Wicked Women (film) (1977/8), a film by Jesús Franco
- Wicked Women (TV series) (1970), a six-part series which featured as part of ITV Sunday Night Theatre
