= In Concert (Janis Joplin album) =

Live album by Janis Joplin
- Released: April 24, 1972
- Recorded: April 2 – June 23, 1968; April 4 – July 4, 1970
- Venue: Detroit, San Francisco, Calgary & Toronto
- Length: 76:50
- Label: Columbia

Janis Joplin chronology
Pearl (1971)	In Concert (1972)	Janis Joplin's Greatest Hits (1973)

In Concert is a live album by Janis Joplin. It was released in 1972, after Joplin's death, as a double-LP record. The first record contains performances with Big Brother and the Holding Company and the second with the Full Tilt Boogie Band, recorded at various locations in 1968 and 1970. The album lacks any live recordings with her first solo effort with the Kozmic Blues band though songs that had been produced with that band were performed in the recordings of the Full Tilt Boogie Band. The photographs used for the gatefold album were taken by photographer David Gahr in New York City in 1969 and 1970.

== Content ==
The live performances of "Down on Me" and "Ball and Chain" included on the double album would appear on Janis Joplin's Greatest Hits album a year later. Two songs, "All Is Loneliness" and "Ego Rock", were performed April 4, 1970 when Joplin reunited with Big Brother & the Holding Company over a year after leaving the group, to perform at the Fillmore West venue in San Francisco. While the recordings with Big Brother and the Holding Company were taken from various performances from 1968 and 1970, the entire live recordings with the Full Tilt Boogie Band were performed at the Festival Express in Toronto and Calgary in Canada on June 28, and July 4, 1970, respectively.

On the original copies of the album side one was backed with side four, and side two backing side three, which was relatively common with multi-LP albums to promote automatic record changers.

== Critical reception ==
Professional ratings
Review scores
Source	Rating
AllMusic	3/5 stars
Creem	A−
Rolling Stone	(favorable)

William Ruhlmann of AllMusic gave a positive review of the performances on the double-LP record, highlighting Joplin's raw vocal performance and her delivery of describing her life through her performance to her audience. He also cited various parts of the record as "moving, parts are heart-breaking, and the rest is just great rock & roll".

Lester Bangs of the RollingStone gave a mixed review, describing the recordings as "second-rate", but compliments the energy delivered with the performances, stating; "Everyone is having a ball no matter how sloppy the music gets; in fact its sense of errant energy with no place to go but up is part of its power. Janis, the band, the audience, all feeding off of each other and giving back as much as they can of what they get." Bangs also noted that Joplin's increasing deterioration was "graphically" apparent in the recordings, stating; "On the record, we hear her as she gradually passes from the tailend of the initial exuberant phase with Big Brother, through the jarring difference between that on-stage persona and what emerges immediately in the Full-Tilt Boogie Band tapes, on which we hear a disoriented and thoroughly pathetic individual and a music whose raggedness is made even less palatable by the breakdown and sense of strain behind it."

== Charts ==
Chart (1972)	Peak position
Australian Kent Music Report	9
Germany	28
US Billboard Top LPs	4
UK Albums Chart	30

== Track listing ==
Side one
No.	Title	Writer(s)	Recording date	Length
1.	"Down on Me"	Traditional; arranged by Janis Joplin	March 2, 1968 at the Grande Ballroom, Detroit, Michigan	3:07
2.	"Bye, Bye Baby"	Powell St. John	April 12, 1968 at the Winterland Ballroom, San Francisco, California	4:27
3.	"All Is Loneliness"	Louis Hardin	April 4, 1970, at the Fillmore West, San Francisco, California	5:45
4.	"Piece of My Heart"	Bert Berns, Jerry Ragovoy	March 2, 1968, Grande Ballroom	4:09

Side two
No.	Title	Writer(s)	Recording date	Length
5.	"Road Block"	Joplin, Pete Albin	June 23, 1968, the Carousel Ballroom, San Francisco, California	2:59
6.	"Flower in the Sun"	Sam Andrew	June 23, 1968, Carousel Ballroom	3:03
7.	"Summertime"	George Gershwin, DuBose Heyward	June 23, 1968, Carousel Ballroom	4:45
8.	"Ego Rock"	Joplin, Nick Gravenites	April 4, 1970, Fillmore West	8:02

Side three
No.	Title	Writer(s)	Recording date	Length
9.	"Half Moon"	John Hall, Joanna Hall	June 28, 1970, Festival Express, Toronto, Ontario	5:14
10.	"Kozmic Blues"	Joplin, Gabriel Mekler	June 28, 1970, Festival Express, Toronto	4:45
11.	"Move Over"	Joplin	July 4, 1970, Festival Express, Calgary	6:37

Side four
No.	Title	Writer(s)	Recording date	Length
12.	"Try (Just a Little Bit Harder)"	Ragovoy, Chip Taylor	July 4, 1970, Festival Express, Calgary, Alberta	7:51
13.	"Get It While You Can"	Ragovoy, Mort Shuman	July 4, 1970, Festival Express, Calgary	7:04
14.	"Ball and Chain"	Willie Mae Thornton	July 4, 1970, Festival Express, Calgary	8:03
Total length:				76:50

== Personnel ==
- Janis Joplin – vocals with:

Big Brother and the Holding Company (Side A and B)

- James Gurley – guitar
- Sam Andrew – guitar
- Peter Albin – bass
- Dave Getz – drums
- Nick Gravenites – vocal duet on "Ego Rock"

Full Tilt Boogie Band (Side C and D)

- John Till – guitar
- Richard Bell – piano
- Ken Pearson – organ
- Brad Campbell – bass
- Clark Pierson – drums

Technical

- Fred Catero, David Dillar, Dan Healy, Owsley, Don Puluse, Larry Keyes, Tim Geelan – recording
- Elliot Mazer – compilation
- David Gahr – cover photography
