= Janis Joplin =

American singer-songwriter (1943–1970)

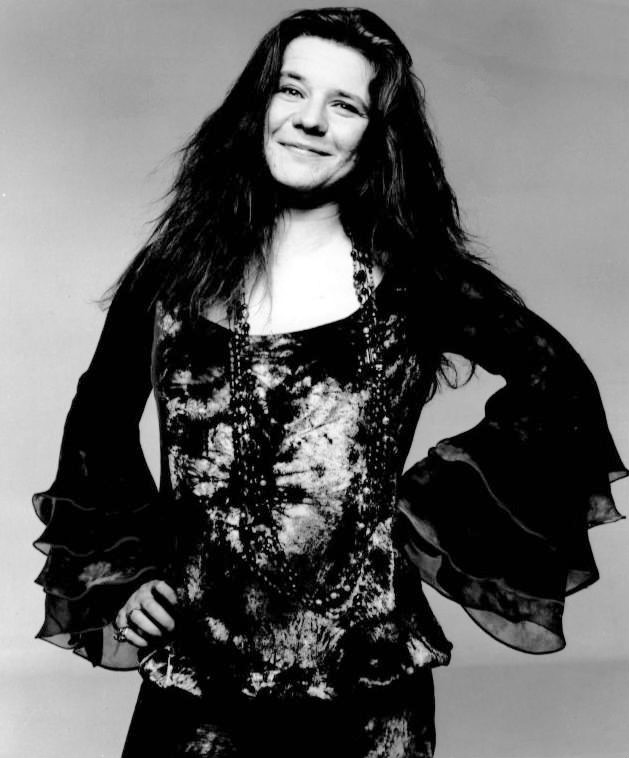
- Joplin in June 1970
- Born: Janis Lyn Joplin; January 19, 1943; Port Arthur, Texas, U.S.
- Died: October 4, 1970 (aged 27); Los Angeles, California, U.S.
- Cause of death: Accidental heroin overdose
- Resting place: Cremated; ashes scattered into the Pacific Ocean
- Occupations: Singer-songwriter; musician
- Awards: Grammy Lifetime Achievement Award; Grammy Hall of Fame
- Musical career
- Genres: Psychedelic rock; blues rock; soul; blues
- Instruments: Vocals; guitar
- Years active: 1962–1970
- Label: Columbia
- Formerly of: Big Brother and the Holding Company; Full Tilt Boogie Band
- Website: janisjoplin.com

Janis Lyn Joplin (January 19, 1943 – October 4, 1970) was an American singer-songwriter and musician. One of the most iconic and successful rock performers of her era, she was noted for her powerful mezzo-soprano vocals and her stage presence.

In 1967, she rose to prominence following an appearance at the Monterey International Pop Festival in Monterey, California, where she was the lead singer of the then little-known San Francisco psychedelic rock band Big Brother and the Holding Company. After releasing two albums with the band, she left Big Brother to continue as a solo artist with her own backing groups, first the Kozmic Blues Band and then the Full Tilt Boogie Band. She performed at the 1969 Woodstock Festival and on the Festival Express train tour. Five singles by Joplin reached the US Billboard Hot 100, including a cover of the Kris Kristofferson song "Me and Bobby McGee", which posthumously reached number one in March 1971. Her most popular songs include her cover versions of "Piece of My Heart", "Cry Baby", "Down on Me", "Ball and Chain", and "Summertime", as well as her original song "Mercedes Benz", which was her final recording.

Joplin died of a heroin overdose in October 1970, at the age of 27. A second solo album, Pearl, was released in January 1971, three months after her death. It reached number one on the Billboard 200. In 1995, she became the first female solo artist to be inducted into the Rock and Roll Hall of Fame in her first year of eligibility. Rolling Stone ranked Joplin number 28 on its 2008 list of the "200 Greatest Singers of All Time", dropping to number 78 in the 2023 list. As of 2026, she was still one of the top-selling vocalists in the United States, with Recording Industry Association of America (RIAA) certifications of 18.5 million albums sold.

== Early life ==
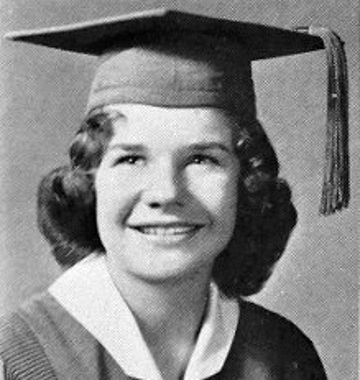
Joplin in 1960 as a graduating senior in high school

Janis Lyn Joplin was born in Port Arthur, Texas, on January 19, 1943, to Dorothy Bonita East (1913–1998), a registrar at a business college, and her husband, Seth Ward Joplin (1910–1987), an engineer at Texaco. She had two younger siblings, Laura and Michael. The family attended First Christian Church of Port Arthur, a congregation belonging to the Christian Church (Disciples of Christ) denomination.

Her parents felt that Janis needed more attention than their other children. As a teenager, Joplin befriended a group of outcasts, one of whom had albums by blues artists Bessie Smith, Ma Rainey, and Lead Belly, which Joplin later credited with influencing her decision to become a singer. She began singing blues and folk music with friends at Thomas Jefferson High School. In high school, she was a classmate of Pro Football Hall of Fame coach Jimmy Johnson. Joplin stated that she was ostracized and bullied in high school. As a teen, she became overweight and suffered from acne, leaving her with deep scars that required dermabrasion.

Joplin graduated from high school in 1960 and attended Lamar State College of Technology in Beaumont, Texas, during the summer and later the University of Texas at Austin (UT), although she did not complete her college studies. The campus newspaper, The Daily Texan, ran a profile of her in the issue dated July 27, 1962, headlined "She Dares to Be Different." The article began, "She goes barefooted when she feels like it, wears Levi's to class because they're more comfortable, and carries her Autoharp with her everywhere she goes so that in case she gets the urge to break into song, it will be handy. Her name is Janis Joplin." While at UT she performed with a folk trio called the Waller Creek Boys (Powell St. John and Lanny Wiggins), showcasing her strong mezzo-soprano vocals, and frequently socialized with the staff of the campus humor magazine The Texas Ranger. According to Freak Brothers cartoonist Gilbert Shelton, who befriended her, she used to sell copies of The Texas Ranger, which contained some of Shelton's early comics, on the campus.

== Career ==
=== 1962–1965: Early recordings ===
Joplin cultivated a rebellious manner and styled herself partly after her female blues heroines and partly after the Beat poets. Her first song, "What Good Can Drinkin' Do", was recorded on tape in December 1962 at the home of a fellow University of Texas student. She left Texas in January 1963, "Just to get away," she said, "because my head was in a much different place", hitchhiking with her friend Chet Helms to North Beach, San Francisco. Still in San Francisco in 1964, Joplin and future Jefferson Airplane guitarist Jorma Kaukonen recorded a number of blues standards, which incidentally featured Kaukonen's wife Margareta using a typewriter in the background. This session included seven tracks: "Typewriter Talk", "Trouble in Mind", "Kansas City Blues", "Hesitation Blues", "Nobody Knows You When You're Down and Out", "Daddy, Daddy, Daddy", and "Long Black Train Blues", and was released long after Joplin's death as the bootleg album The Typewriter Tape.

In 1963, Joplin was arrested in San Francisco for shoplifting. During the two years that followed, her drug use increased and she acquired a reputation as a "speed freak" and occasional heroin user. She also used other psychoactive drugs and was a heavy drinker throughout her career; her favorite alcoholic beverage was Southern Comfort. In May 1965, Joplin's friends in San Francisco, noticing the detrimental effects on her from regularly injecting methamphetamine—she was described as "skeletal" and "emaciated"— persuaded her to return to Port Arthur. During that month, her friends threw her a bus-fare party so she could return to her parents in Texas. Five years later, Joplin told Rolling Stone magazine writer David Dalton the following about her first stint in San Francisco: "I didn't have many friends and I didn't like the ones I had."

Back in Port Arthur in the spring of 1965, after Joplin's parents noticed her weight of 88 pounds (40 kg), she changed her lifestyle. She avoided drugs, adopted a beehive hairdo, and enrolled as an anthropology major at Lamar University in nearby Beaumont, Texas. Her sister Laura said in a 2016 interview that social work was her major during her year at Lamar. During her time at Lamar University, she commuted to Austin to sing solo, accompanying herself on acoustic guitar. One of her performances was at a benefit by local musicians for Texas bluesman Mance Lipscomb, who was suffering with ill health. Joplin became engaged to Peter de Blanc in the fall of 1965. She had begun a relationship with him toward the end of her first stint in San Francisco. Now living in New York where he worked with IBM computers, he visited her to ask her father for her hand in marriage. Joplin and her mother began planning the wedding. De Blanc, who traveled frequently, ended the engagement soon afterward.

In 1965 and 1966, Joplin commuted from her family's Port Arthur home to Beaumont, Texas, where she had regular sessions with a psychiatric social worker named Bernard Giarritano at a counseling agency that was funded by the United Fund (now the United Way). Interviewed by biographer Myra Friedman after his client's death, Giarritano said Joplin had been baffled by how she could pursue a professional career as a singer without relapsing into drugs, and her drug-related memories from immediately prior to returning to Port Arthur continued to frighten her. Joplin sometimes brought an acoustic guitar with her to her sessions with Giarritano, and people in other offices within the building could hear her singing. Giarritano tried to reassure her that she did not have to use narcotics to succeed in the music business. She also said that if she were to avoid singing professionally, she would have to become a keypunch operator, as she had done a few years earlier, or a secretary, and then a wife and mother, and she would have to become similar to all the other women in Port Arthur. Approximately a year before Joplin joined Big Brother and the Holding Company, she recorded seven studio tracks with her acoustic guitar. Among the songs she recorded were her original composition of "Turtle Blues" and an alternate version of "Cod'ine" by Buffy Sainte-Marie. These tracks were later released as an album in 1995, titled This is Janis Joplin 1965.

=== 1966–1969: Big Brother and the Holding Company ===
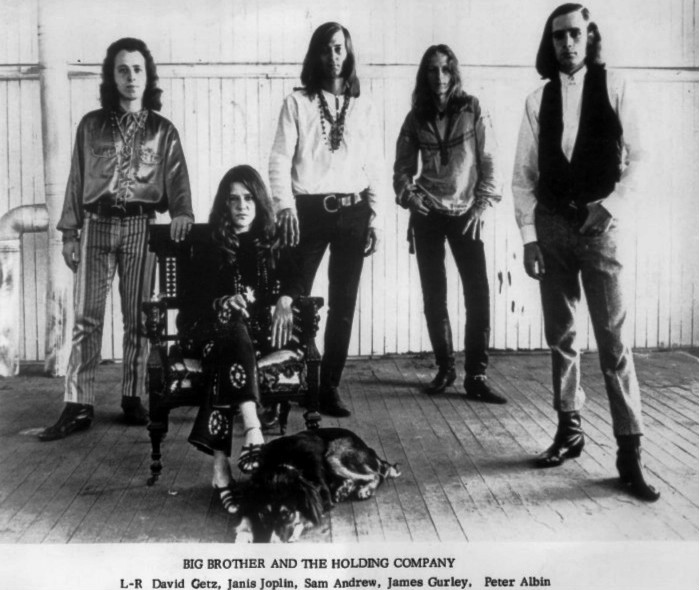
Joplin (seated) with Big Brother and the Holding Company, c. 1966–1967

In 1966, Joplin's bluesy vocal style attracted the attention of the San Francisco-based psychedelic rock band Big Brother and the Holding Company, which had gained some renown among the nascent hippie community in Haight-Ashbury. She was recruited to join the group by Chet Helms, a promoter who was managing Big Brother and with whom she had hitchhiked from Texas to San Francisco a few years earlier. Helms sent his friend Travis Rivers to find her in Austin, Texas, where she had been performing with her acoustic guitar, and to accompany her to San Francisco. At that time, she gave her parents the impression Austin was her final destination and it was the location of the rock band she was joining. Joplin joined Big Brother on June 4, 1966. Her first public performance with them was at the Avalon Ballroom in San Francisco. Soon after that, her parents received a letter from her, and that was how they learned she was in San Francisco, not Austin.

In June 1966, Joplin was still strict about drug use and when she shared an apartment with Travis Rivers upon their arrival in San Francisco, she made him promise that using needles would not be allowed there. When bandmate Dave Getz accompanied her from a rehearsal to her home, Rivers was not there, but "two or three", according to Getz' recollection 25 years later, guests whom Rivers had invited were in the process of injecting drugs. "One of them was about to tie off," recalled Getz. "Janis went nuts! I had never seen anybody explode like that. She was screaming and crying and Travis walked in. She screamed at him: 'We had a pact! You promised me! There wouldn't be any of that in front of me!' I was over my head and I tried to calm her down. I said, 'They're just doing mescaline,' because that's what I thought it was. She said, 'You don't understand! I can't see that! I just can't stand to see that!'"

A San Francisco concert from that summer (1966) was recorded and released on the 1984 album Cheaper Thrills. Joplin had a short relationship and longer friendship with Grateful Dead founding member Ron "Pigpen" McKernan. The band went to Chicago for a four-week engagement in August 1966, then found itself stranded after the promoter ran out of money when its concerts did not attract the expected audience levels, and he was unable to pay them. In the unfortunate circumstances the band signed with Bob Shad's record label Mainstream Records; recordings for the label took place in Chicago in September, but these were not satisfactory, and the band returned to San Francisco, continuing to perform live, including at the Love Pageant Rally. The band recorded two tracks, "Blindman" and "All Is Loneliness" in Los Angeles, and these were released by Mainstream as a single that did not sell well. After playing at a happening in Stanford in early December 1966, the band traveled back to Los Angeles to record ten tracks between December 12 and 14, 1966, produced by Bob Shad, which appeared on the band's debut album in August 1967. In late 1966, Big Brother switched managers from Chet Helms to Julius Karpen. Janis Joplin and Big Brother performed there along with the Hare Krishna founder Bhaktivedanta Swami, Allen Ginsberg, Moby Grape, and the Grateful Dead, donating proceeds to the Krishna temple. In early 1967, Joplin met Country Joe McDonald of the group Country Joe and the Fish. The pair lived together as a couple for a few months in her Lyon Street apartment. A driver's license, issued to Joplin in 1967, shows her residence as 122 Lyon Street No. 3, in San Francisco. Joplin and Big Brother played at the Hollywood Bowl in Los Angeles, as well as in Seattle, Washington; Vancouver, British Columbia; the Psychedelic Supermarket in Boston, Massachusetts; and the Golden Bear Club in Huntington Beach, California.

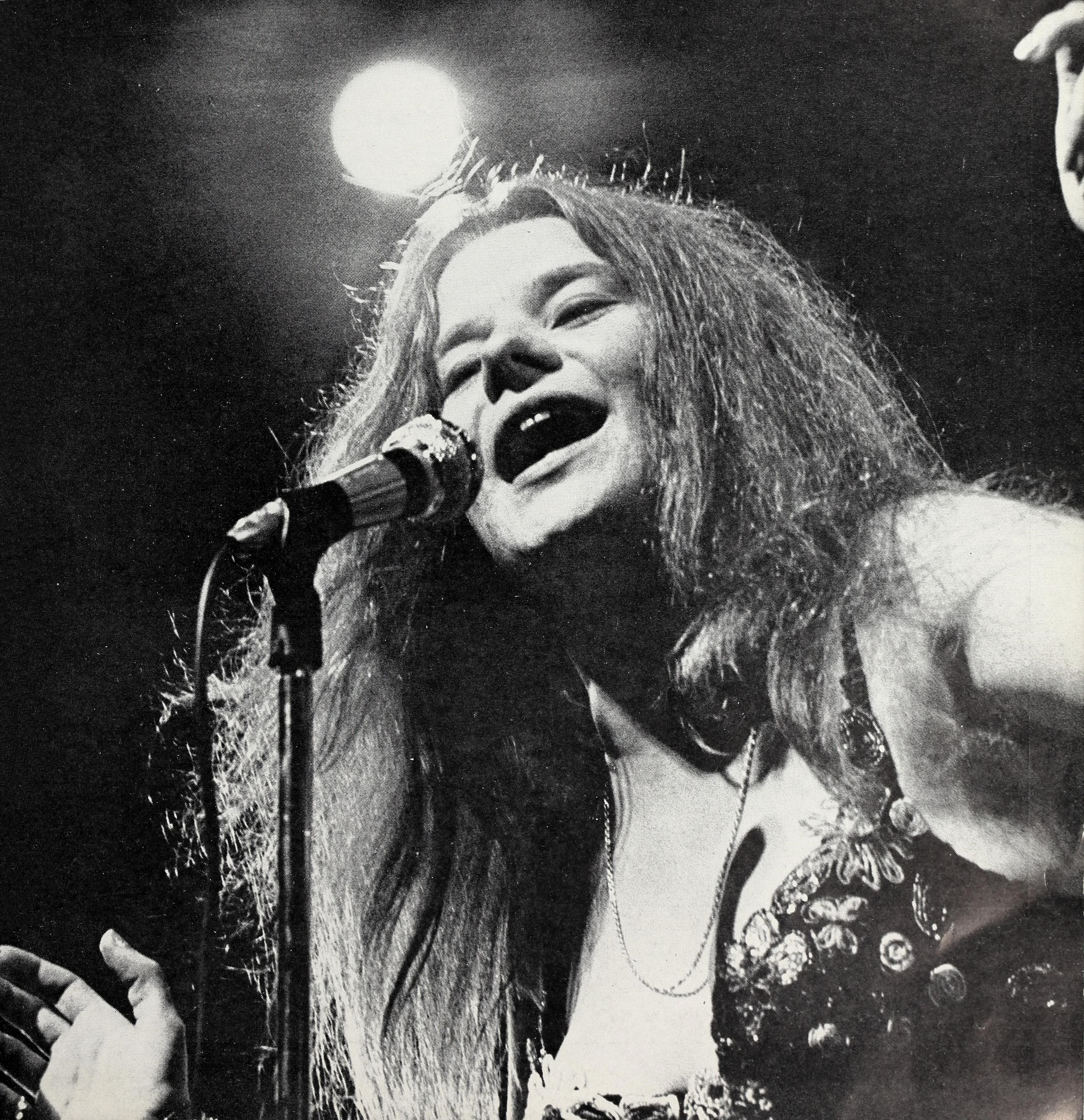
Joplin on the cover of Cash Box; September 7, 1968

The band's debut studio album, Big Brother & the Holding Company, was released by Mainstream Records in August 1967, shortly after the group's breakthrough appearance in June at the Monterey Pop Festival. Two tracks, "Coo Coo" and "The Last Time", were released separately as singles, while the tracks from the previous single, "Blindman" and "All Is Loneliness", were added to the remaining eight tracks. When Columbia Records took over the band's contract and re-released the album, they included "Coo Coo" and "The Last Time", and put "featuring Janis Joplin" on the cover. The debut album spawned four minor hits sung by Joplin including "Down on Me", a traditional song arranged by Joplin, "Bye Bye Baby", "Call On Me" and "Coo Coo". All but one of the tracks of their next album Cheap Thrills were recorded in the studio with only "Ball and Chain" actually recorded in front of a paying audience. The album had a raw quality, including the sound of a drinking glass breaking and the broken shards being swept away during the song "Turtle Blues". Cheap Thrills produced popular hits with "Piece of My Heart" and "Summertime". Together with the premiere of the documentary film Monterey Pop at New York's Lincoln Center for the Performing Arts on December 26, 1968, the album launched Joplin as a star. Cheap Thrills reached number one on the Billboard 200 album chart eight weeks after its release, and was number one for eight (non-consecutive) weeks.

=== Kozmic Blues and Woodstock (1969–1970) ===
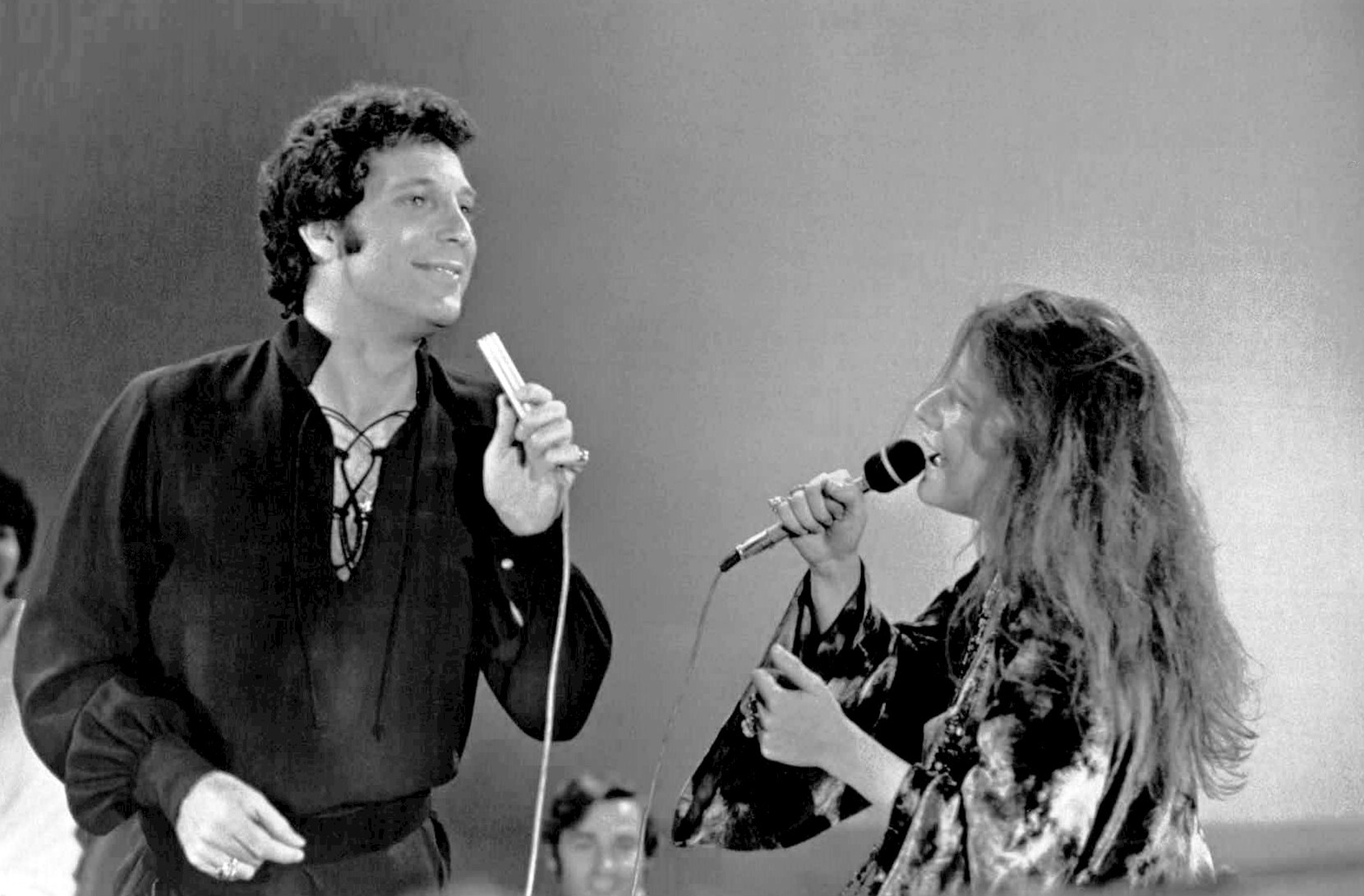
Joplin performs with Tom Jones on This Is Tom Jones in late 1969

After splitting from Big Brother and the Holding Company, Joplin formed a new backup group, the Kozmic Blues Band, composed of session musicians such as keyboardist Stephen Ryder and saxophonist Cornelius "Snooky" Flowers, as well as former Big Brother and the Holding Company guitarist Sam Andrew and future Full Tilt Boogie Band bassist Brad Campbell. The band was influenced by the Stax-Volt rhythm and blues (R&B) and soul bands of the 1960s, as exemplified by Otis Redding and the Bar-Kays. By early 1969, Joplin was allegedly shooting at least $200 worth of heroin per day (equivalent to $1,756 in 2025) although efforts were made to keep her clean during the recording of I Got Dem Ol' Kozmic Blues Again Mama! Gabriel Mekler, who produced the album, kept her away from drugs and her drug-using friends during the record's production. Joplin's appearances with the Kozmic Blues Band in Europe were released in theaters, in multiple documentaries. Janis, which was reviewed by The Washington Post on March 21, 1975, shows Joplin arriving in Frankfurt by plane. The film Janis includes interviews with Joplin in Stockholm and from her visit to London for her gig at Royal Albert Hall. John Byrne Cooke, road manager for Joplin and the Kozmic Blues Band, wrote a book about her ongoing use of narcotics, particularly when she was outside the United States. On the episode of The Dick Cavett Show that was telecast in the United States on the night of July 18, 1969, Joplin and her band performed "Try (Just a Little Bit Harder)" as well as "To Love Somebody".

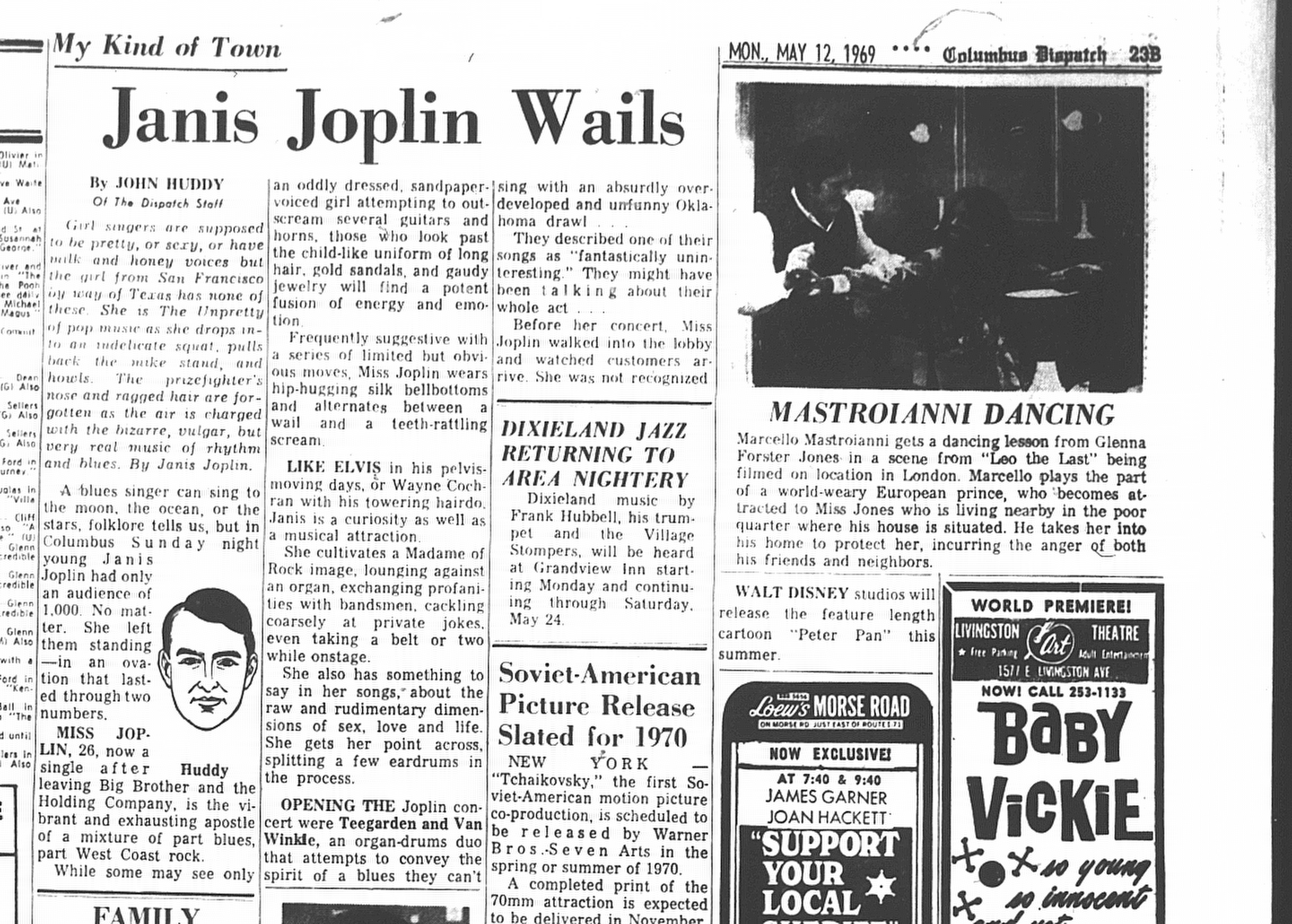
Newspaper review of Joplin's 1969 concert at Vets Memorial Auditorium in Columbus, Ohio includes the fact that before it started she walked to the lobby and watched audience members arrive. They did not recognize her or pay attention to her.

Joplin performed at Woodstock starting at approximately 2:00 a.m., on Sunday, August 17, 1969. Joplin had informed her band that they would be performing at the concert as if it were just another gig. Joplin was flown by helicopter with the pregnant Joan Baez and Baez's mother to the festival site. During the helicopter ride, she saw the enormous crowd and instantly became extremely nervous and giddy, as Baez recalled. Initially, Joplin was eager to get on the stage and perform, but was repeatedly delayed as bands were contractually obliged to perform ahead of Joplin. Faced with a ten-hour wait after arriving at the backstage area, Joplin spent some of that time shooting heroin and drinking alcohol with her friend and sometimes lover Peggy Caserta in a tent. Joplin pulled through, and engaged frequently with the crowd, asking them if they had everything they needed and if they were staying stoned. The audience cheered for an encore, to which Joplin replied and sang "Ball and Chain". Pete Townshend, who performed with the Who later in the same morning after Joplin finished, witnessed her performance and said in his 2012 memoir, "She had been amazing at Monterey, but tonight she wasn't at her best, due, probably, to the long delay, and probably, too, to the amount of booze and heroin she'd consumed while she waited. But even Janis on an off-night was incredible." Janis remained at Woodstock for the remainder of the festival. Starting at approximately 3:00 a.m. on Monday, August 18, Joplin was among many Woodstock performers who stood in a circle behind Crosby, Stills & Nash during their performance. This information was published by David Crosby in 1988. Later in the morning of August 18, Joplin and Joan Baez sat in Joe Cocker's van and witnessed Hendrix's close-of-show performance, according to Baez's memoir And a Voice to Sing With (1989).

Joplin was unhappy with her performance, however, and her singing was not included, by her own insistence, in the 1970 documentary film or the soundtrack for Woodstock: Music from the Original Soundtrack and More - although the 25th anniversary director's cut of the film includes her performance of "Work Me, Lord".

Joplin was arrested for using "vulgar and indecent language" on November 16, 1969, at the Curtis Hixon Hall in Tampa, Florida, after yelling "Don't fuck with those people!" toward police officers doing crowd control, for which she was found guilty and fined $200 plus court costs. In addition to Woodstock and her Tampa concert, in 1969 Joplin had problems at Madison Square Garden. Her publicist-turned-biographer Myra Friedman said, after Joplin's death, she had witnessed a duet Joplin sang with Tina Turner during the opening act (Ike and Tina Turner) for a Rolling Stones concert at the Garden on Thanksgiving Day. Friedman said Joplin was "so drunk, so stoned, so out of control, that she could have been an institutionalized psychotic rent by mania." An audio recording of the duet exists online. During another Garden concert where she had solo billing on December 19, some observers believed Joplin tried to incite the audience to riot. For part of this concert she was joined onstage by Johnny Winter and Paul Butterfield. Joplin told rock journalist David Dalton that Garden audiences watched and listened to "every note [she sang] with 'Is she gonna make it?' in their eyes."

Released in September 1969, the Kozmic Blues album was certified gold later that year but did not match the success of Cheap Thrills. Reviews of the new group were mixed. Some music critics, including Ralph J. Gleason of the San Francisco Chronicle, were negative. Gleason wrote that the new band was a "drag" and Joplin should "scrap" her new band and "go right back to being a member of Big Brother ... (if they'll have her)." Other reviewers, such as reporter Carl Bernstein of The Washington Post, devoted entire articles to celebrating the singer's magic. Bernstein's review said that Joplin "has finally assembled a group of first-rate musicians with whom she is totally at ease and whose abilities complement the incredible range of her voice." Columbia Records released "Kozmic Blues" as a single, which peaked at number 41 on the Billboard Hot 100, and a live rendition of "Raise Your Hand" was released in Germany and became a top ten hit there. Containing other hits like "Try (Just a Little Bit Harder)", "To Love Somebody", and "Little Girl Blue", I Got Dem Ol' Kozmic Blues Again Mama! reached number five on the Billboard 200 soon after its release.

==== January–June 1970 ====
At the time of the June 1970 interview with Dalton, she had already performed in the Bay Area for what turned out to be the last time. Sam Andrew, the lead guitarist who had left Big Brother with Joplin in December 1968 to form her back-up band, quit in late summer 1969 and returned to Big Brother. At the end of the year, the Kozmic Blues Band broke up. Their final gig with Joplin was the one at Madison Square Garden with Winter and Butterfield. In February 1970, Joplin traveled to Brazil, where she stopped her drug use. She was accompanied on vacation there by her friend Linda Gravenites (wife of songwriter Nick Gravenites), who had designed Janis's stage costumes from 1967 to 1969. In Brazil, Joplin was romanced by a fellow American tourist named David (George) Niehaus, who was traveling around the world. Niehaus and Joplin were photographed by the press at Rio Carnival in Rio de Janeiro. Gravenites also took color photographs of the two during their Brazilian vacation. According to Joplin biographer Ellis Amburn, in Gravenites' snapshots they "look like a carefree, happy, healthy young couple having a tremendously good time."

Rolling Stone magazine interviewed Joplin during an international phone call, quoting her: "I'm going into the jungle with a big bear of a beatnik named David Niehaus. I finally remembered I don't have to be on stage twelve months a year. I've decided to go and dig some other jungles for a couple of weeks." Amburn added in 1992, "Janis was trying to kick heroin in Brazil, and one of the nicest things about David was that he wasn't into drugs." When Joplin returned to the U.S., she began using heroin again. Her relationship with Niehaus soon ended because he witnessed her shooting drugs at her new home in Larkspur, California. The relationship was also complicated by her ongoing romantic relationship with Peggy Caserta, who also was an intravenous addict, and Joplin's refusal to take some time off and travel the world with him. Prior to beginning a summer tour with a newly formed band, she performed in final appearances with Big Brother in a reunion at the Fillmore West, in San Francisco, on April 4, 1970. Recordings from this concert were included on Joplin in Concert released posthumously in 1972. She again appeared with Big Brother on April 12 at Winterland, where she and Big Brother were reported to be in excellent form.

Around this time, she formed her new band, known for a short time as Main Squeeze, then renamed the Full Tilt Boogie Band. The band comprised mostly young Canadian musicians previously associated with Ronnie Hawkins and featured an organ, but no horn section. Joplin took a more active role in putting together the Full Tilt Boogie band than she had with her prior group. She was quoted as saying, "It's my band. Finally it's my band!" In May 1970, after performing under the name Main Squeeze at a Hells Angels event, the renamed Full Tilt Boogie Band began a nationwide tour. Joplin became very happy with her new group, which eventually received mostly positive feedback from both her fans and the critics. She performed with the band, billed as Main Squeeze, at a party for the Hells Angels at a venue in San Rafael, California, on May 21, 1970, according to a website maintained by Big Brother guitarist Sam Andrew. Andrew's web site quotes him as saying, "This will be the first time that Janis' old band and her new band will be at the same venue, so everyone is a little on edge."

According to Joplin's biographer Ellis Amburn, Big Brother with its lead singer Nick Gravenites was the opening act at the party that was attended by 2,300 people. The Hells Angels, who had known Joplin since 1966, paid her a fee of $240 to perform. Gravenites and Sam Andrew (who had resumed playing guitar with Big Brother) differed in their opinions of her performance and how substance abuse affected it. Gravenites described her singing as "stupendous", according to Amburn. Amburn quoted Andrew twenty years later: "She was visibly deteriorating and she looked bloated. She was like a parody of what she was at her best. I put it down to her drinking too much and I felt a tinge of fear for her well-being. Her singing was real flabby, no edge at all." Shortly thereafter, Joplin began wearing multi-colored feather boas in her hair. (She had not worn them at the May 21 Hells Angels party/concert in San Rafael.) By the time she began touring with Full Tilt Boogie, Joplin told people she was drug-free, but her drinking increased.

=== Pearl (June–October 1970) ===
During Joplin's June 1970 concert tour with Full Tilt Boogie, she told Rolling Stone magazine journalist David Dalton and others that four years earlier, Travis Rivers had seduced her and slept with her so she would feel obligated to join Big Brother, and the story was false, according to many Joplin biographers including Myra Friedman.

Joplin's friends, including Friedman, had admired for years the honesty she displayed in conversations with them. She never seemed phony. In 1970, they became dismayed when they noticed she was starting to make up stories about herself to enhance a public image as a "zany" (Friedman's description) sex symbol who was constantly searching for a man to love her. Joplin's March 20 statement to Rolling Stone that she and David Niehaus were "going into the jungle" was not true. On June 25, Dick Cavett said to her on-camera, "When last I heard of you, you were in the jungles of Brazil, or maybe not the jungles."

From June 28 to July 4, 1970, during the Festival Express tour where a train transported musicians across Canada, Joplin and Full Tilt Boogie performed alongside Buddy Guy, The Band, the Flying Burrito Brothers, Ten Years After, the Grateful Dead, Delaney & Bonnie, Eric Andersen, and Ian & Sylvia. They played concerts in Toronto, Winnipeg, and Calgary. Footage of her performance of "Tell Mama" in Calgary became an MTV video in the early 1980s.

David Dalton was part of Joplin's entourage throughout her June 1970 concerts in the United States and on board the Festival Express train. After her death, he made transcripts of numerous cassette tapes on which he had recorded her speaking. Dalton eventually lost all the recordings except for the Festival Express train conversation between Joplin and Bonnie Bramlett of Delaney & Bonnie. Dalton's last cassette expired moments after Joplin's over-the-top comment to Bramlett, "All my life I just wanted to be a beatnik – meet all the heavies, get stoned, get laid, have a good time... I knew I had a good voice and I could always get a couple of beers off of it. All of a sudden someone threw me in this rock'n'roll band. They threw these musicians at me, man, and the sound was coming from behind. The bass was charging me."

Among Joplin's last public appearances were two broadcasts of The Dick Cavett Show. In her June 25, 1970, appearance, she announced that she would attend her ten-year high school class reunion. When asked if she had been popular in school, she admitted that when in high school, her schoolmates "laughed me out of class, out of town and out of the state". On July 11, 1970, Full Tilt Boogie and Big Brother and the Holding Company both performed at the same concert in the San Diego Sports Arena, which was decades later renamed the Valley View Casino Center. Joplin sang with Full Tilt Boogie and appeared briefly onstage with Big Brother without singing, according to a July 13 review of the concert in the San Diego Union. On August 7, 1970, a tombstone—jointly paid for by Joplin and Juanita Green, a registered nurse who as a child had done housework for Bessie Smith—was erected at Smith's previously unmarked grave. Joplin had frequently cited Bessie Smith as a musical influence. The lead paragraph of an Associated Press story said Joplin and Green had "shared the cost of a stone for the 'Empress of the Blues,'" but, according to publicist/biographer Myra Friedman, Joplin and Green never met. Joplin was at home when she received a phone call from someone who explained the situation with Smith's gravesite, and she mailed a check to contribute to the new marker.

During this time, she first performed "Mercedes Benz", a song partially inspired by a Michael McClure poem, that she had composed with fellow musician and friend Bob Neuwirth a very short time earlier which would be released on Pearl. According to Myra Friedman's account, Joplin performed two shows at the Capitol Theatre, the first of which was attended by actors Geraldine Page and her husband Rip Torn. Between the shows, at a "gin mill" [Friedman's words] close to this concert venue, Joplin and Neuwirth penned the lyrics to the song and she performed it at the second show, according to Friedman.

Neuwirth was quoted by The Wall Street Journal in 2015: "Around 7 p.m., after the Capitol sound check, we had a couple of hours to kill before [acts that opened for Joplin] Seatrain and Runt finished their sets. So the four of us [Joplin, Neuwirth, Geraldine Page, Rip Torn] walked to a bar about three minutes away called Vahsen's [at 30 Broad Street in Port Chester]." While in Vahsen's, "Janis came up with words for the first verse. I was in charge of writing them down on bar napkins with a ballpoint pen. She came up with the second verse [for "Mercedes Benz"], too, about a color TV. I suggested words here and there, and came up with the third verse—about asking the Lord to buy us a night on the town and another round."

Joplin's last public performance with the Full Tilt Boogie Band took place on August 12, 1970, at the Harvard Stadium in Boston. The Harvard Crimson gave the performance a positive, front-page review, despite the fact that Full Tilt Boogie had performed with makeshift amplifiers after their regular sound equipment was stolen in Boston. Joplin attended her high school reunion on August 14, accompanied by Neuwirth, road manager John Byrne Cooke, and sister Laura, but it was reportedly an unhappy experience for her. Joplin denigrated Port Arthur and the classmates who had humiliated her a decade earlier.

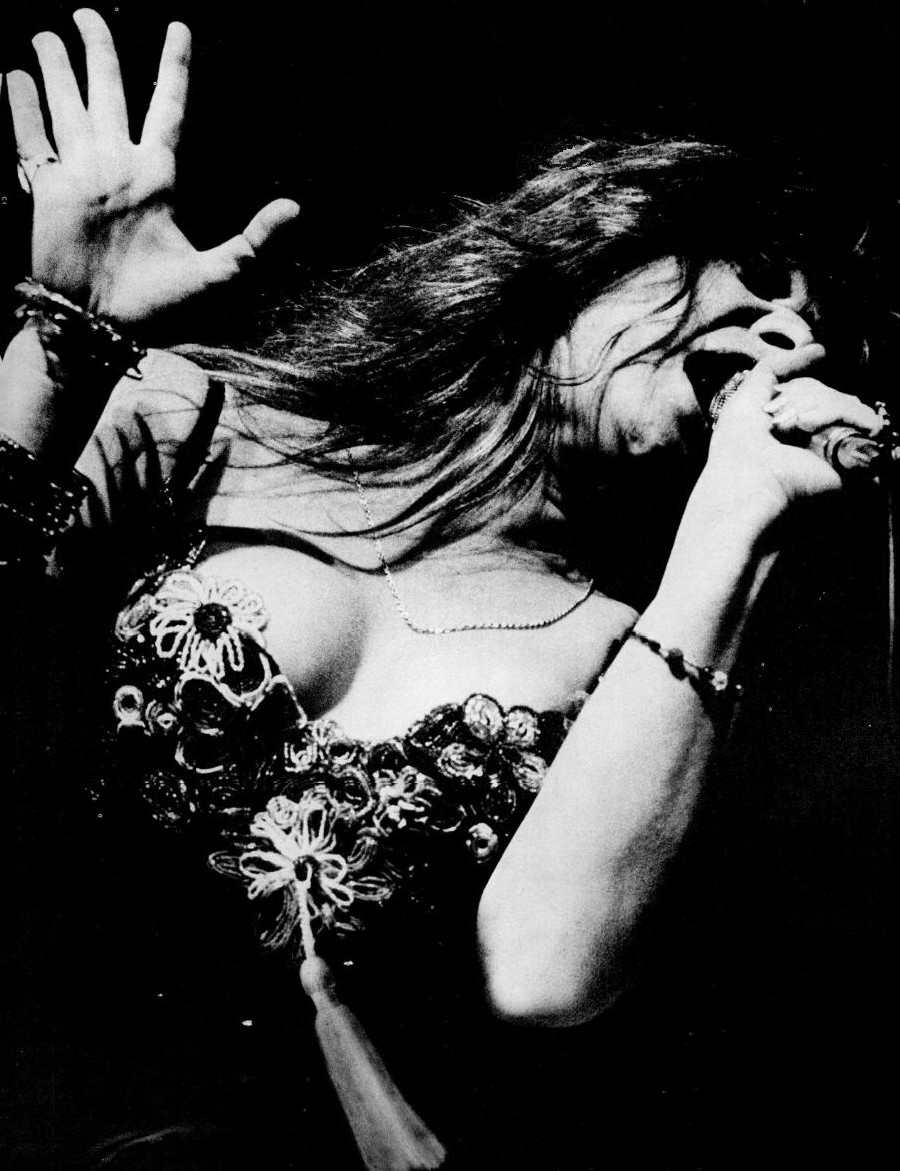
Joplin performing at the Newport Folk Festival in Rhode Island in July 1968

Joplin checked into the Landmark Motor Hotel in Hollywood on August 24, 1970, near Sunset Sound Recorders, where she began rehearsing and recording her album. During the sessions, Joplin continued a relationship with Seth Morgan, a 21-year-old UC Berkeley student, cocaine dealer, and future novelist who had visited her new home in Larkspur in July and August. She and Morgan were engaged to be married in early September, although he visited Sunset Sound Recorders for just eight of Joplin's many rehearsals and sessions. During late August, September, and early October 1970, Joplin and her band rehearsed and recorded a new album in Los Angeles with producer Paul A. Rothchild, best known for his lengthy relationship with The Doors. Although Joplin died before all the tracks were fully completed, there was enough usable material to compile an LP. The posthumous Pearl (1971) became the biggest-selling album of her career and featured her biggest hit single, a cover of Kris Kristofferson and Fred Foster's "Me and Bobby McGee" (Kristofferson had previously been one of Joplin's lovers, though the song was taught to her by Neuwirth). The opening track, "Move Over", was written by Joplin, reflecting the way that she felt men treated women in relationships.

Peggy Caserta claimed in her book Going Down with Janis (1973), that she and Joplin had decided mutually in April 1970 to stay away from each other to avoid enabling each other's drug use. Caserta, a former Delta Air Lines flight attendant and owner of Mnasidika, one of the first clothing boutiques in the Haight Ashbury, said in the book that by September 1970, she was smuggling cannabis throughout California and had checked into the Landmark Motor Hotel because it attracted drug users. During Joplin's stay at the Landmark, she learned of Caserta's presence at the Landmark from a heroin dealer who made deliveries there. Joplin begged Caserta for heroin, and when Caserta refused to provide it, Joplin reportedly admonished her by saying, "Don't think if you can get it, I can't get it." Joplin's publicist Myra Friedman was unaware during Joplin's lifetime that this had happened. Later, while Friedman was working on her book Buried Alive, she determined that the time frame of the Joplin–Caserta encounter was one week before Jimi Hendrix's death. Within a few days, Joplin became a regular customer of the same heroin dealer who had been supplying Caserta.

==== September–October 1970 ====
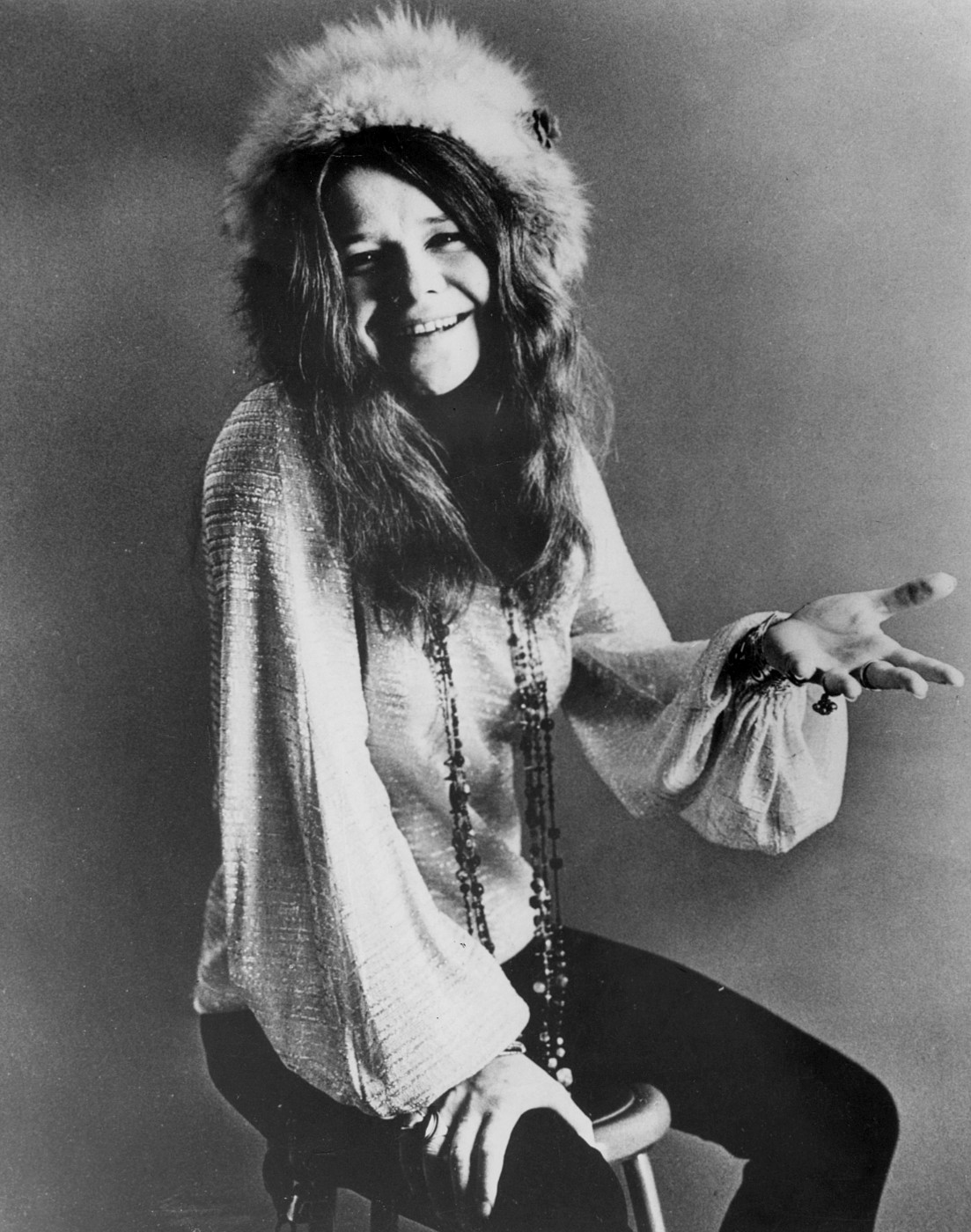
Joplin photographed by Jim Marshall in 1969, one year before her death

Joplin's manager Albert Grossman and his assistant/publicist Friedman had staged an intervention with Joplin the previous winter while Joplin was in New York. Grossman and Friedman knew during Joplin's lifetime that her friend Caserta, whom Friedman had met during the New York sessions for Cheap Thrills and on later occasions, used heroin. In September 1970, Friedman assumed Caserta had been out of Joplin's life for a while. Both Friedman and Grossman lived in New York, and did not visit California during this time frame. When Joplin was not at Sunset Sound Recorders, she liked to drive her Porsche over the speed limit "on the winding part of Sunset Blvd.", according to a statement made by her attorney Robert Gordon in 1995 at the Rock and Roll Hall of Fame induction ceremony. Friedman wrote that the only Full Tilt Boogie member who rode as her passenger, Ken Pearson, often hesitated to join her, though he did on the night she died. He was not interested in using hard drugs. On September 26, 1970, Joplin recorded vocals for "Half Moon" and "Cry Baby". The session ended with Joplin, organist Ken Pearson, and drummer Clark Pierson making a special one-minute recording as a birthday gift to John Lennon with the Dale Evans composition "Happy Trails" as part of the greeting.

On October 1, 1970, Joplin completed her last recording, "Mercedes Benz", which was recorded in a single take. On Saturday, October 3, Joplin visited Sunset Sound Recorders to listen to the instrumental track for Nick Gravenites's song "Buried Alive in the Blues", which the band had recorded earlier that day. She and Paul Rothchild agreed she would record the vocal the following day. Sometime on Saturday, she learned that her boyfriend Seth Morgan had met other women at a Marin County, California, restaurant, and invited them to her home. People at Sunset Sound Recorders overheard Joplin expressing anger about Morgan's actions, as well as joy about the progress of the sessions. Joplin and Ken Pearson later left the studio together and she drove him in her Porsche to the West Hollywood venue called Barney's Beanery, where they met Bennett Glotzer, a business partner of Joplin's manager Albert Grossman. After midnight, she drove Ken Pearson and a male fan from Barney's Beanery to the Landmark Motor Hotel. During the ride, the fan repeatedly asked her about her singing style, and "she mostly ignored him," as Pearson told Myra Friedman. After arriving at the Landmark, where she and Pearson were staying in separate rooms, they prepared to part in the lobby of the Landmark, when she expressed a fear, possibly in jest, that he and the other Full Tilt Boogie musicians might decide to stop making music with her. Then they separated and went to their rooms.

== Death ==
On Sunday evening, October 4, 1970, Joplin was found dead on the floor of her room at the Landmark Motor Hotel by her road manager and close friend John Byrne Cooke. Alcohol was present in the room. Newspapers reported that no other drugs or paraphernalia were present. According to a 1983 book authored by Joseph DiMona and Los Angeles County coroner Thomas Noguchi, evidence of narcotics was removed from the scene by a friend of Joplin and later put back after the person realized that an autopsy was going to reveal that narcotics were in her system. The book adds that prior to Joplin's death, Noguchi had investigated other fatal drug overdoses in Los Angeles where friends believed they were doing favors for decedents by removing evidence of narcotics, but then "thought things over" and returned to put back the evidence. Noguchi performed an autopsy on Joplin and determined the cause of death to be a heroin overdose, possibly compounded by alcohol.

John Byrne Cooke believed Joplin had obtained heroin much more potent than what she and other L.A. heroin users had received on previous occasions, as was indicated by overdoses of several of her dealer's other customers during the same weekend. Her death was ruled accidental.

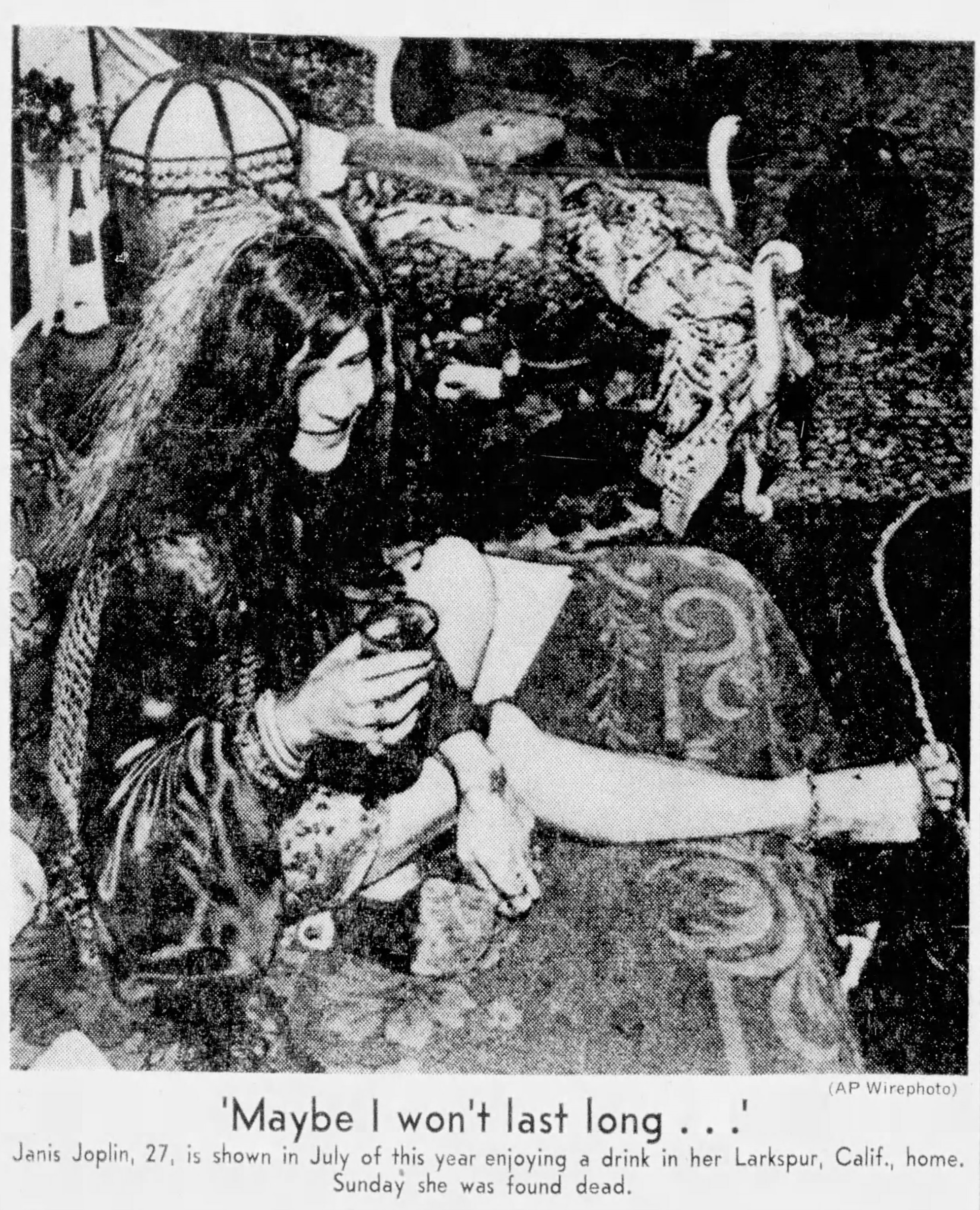
Newspaper clipping, October 5, 1970

Both Peggy Caserta, Joplin's close friend, and Seth Morgan, Joplin's fiancé, failed to meet Joplin on October 2, the Friday immediately before her death; Joplin had been expecting both of them to keep her company that night. According to Caserta, Joplin was saddened that neither of her friends came to the Landmark as promised. During the 24 hours Joplin lived after this disappointment, Caserta did not call to explain why she failed to show up. Caserta admitted to waiting until late Saturday night to dial the Landmark Motel switchboard, only to learn that Joplin had instructed the desk clerk not to accept any incoming calls for her after midnight. Morgan did speak to Joplin via telephone within the 24 hours before her death, but little is known about that call. She used a phone at Sunset Sound Recorders where her colleagues ("there were perhaps twenty to twenty-five people present," wrote biographer Myra Friedman) noticed that whatever Morgan said to her made her very angry.

Peggy Caserta has insisted Joplin's death was not an accidental overdose, but rather a result of a head gash suffered after the "hourglass heel" of her slingback sandal caught in the shag carpet, causing her to lose her balance. Caserta did concede, however, that drugs and/or alcohol may have played a role in hastening Joplin's death that night. Joplin was cremated at Pierce Brothers Westwood Village Memorial Park and Mortuary in Los Angeles, and her ashes were scattered from a plane into the Pacific Ocean.

== Personal life ==
Joplin's significant relationships with men included ones with Peter de Blanc, Country Joe McDonald (who wrote the song "Janis" at Joplin's request), David (George) Niehaus, Kris Kristofferson, and Seth Morgan (from July 1970 until her death, at which time they were allegedly engaged). She also had relationships with women. During her first stint in San Francisco in 1963, Joplin met and briefly lived with Jae Whitaker, a woman whom she had met while playing pool at the bar Gino & Carlo in North Beach. Whitaker broke off their relationship because of Joplin's hard drug use and sexual relationships with other people. Whitaker was first identified by name in connection with Joplin in 1999, when Alice Echols' biography Scars of Sweet Paradise was published.

Joplin had an on-again-off-again romantic relationship with Peggy Caserta. They first met in November 1966 when Big Brother performed at The Matrix in San Francisco. Caserta was one of 15 people in the audience; at the time, she ran Mnasidika, a clothing boutique in the Haight Ashbury. Approximately a month after the concert, Joplin visited Caserta's boutique and said she could not afford to buy a pair of $5 jeans for sale, asking to make a 50 cent down payment. Caserta was amazed such a talented singer could not afford $5, and gave Joplin a pair for free. Their friendship was platonic for more than a year. Before it became romantic, Caserta was in love with Big Brother guitarist Sam Andrew, and sometime during the first half of 1968 traveled from San Francisco to New York to be with him. He did not want a serious relationship, and Joplin sympathized with Caserta's disappointment. The Woodstock concert film includes 37 seconds of Joplin and Caserta walking together before they reached the tent where Joplin waited for her turn to perform. By the time the festival took place in August 1969, both were intravenous heroin addicts.

According to Caserta's book Going Down With Janis, which Caserta has since disowned, Joplin introduced her to her boyfriend Seth Morgan in Joplin's room at the Landmark Motor Hotel on September 29, 1970. Caserta "had seen him around" in San Francisco but had not met him. At some point, an agreement was made for a threesome to take place the following Friday although Caserta later made alternate plans. Morgan made alternate plans, believing Caserta would be with Joplin that evening. Each one was unaware the other had bowed out. The day after Joplin introduced Caserta to Morgan, Caserta saw Joplin briefly when Caserta accommodated her new Los Angeles friend, 19-year-old Debbie Nuciforo. Nuciforo was an aspiring rock drummer who wanted to meet Joplin and was high on heroin at the time. The meeting of the three women was reportedly brief and unpleasant. Caserta suspected the reason for Joplin's foul mood was that Morgan had abandoned her earlier that day after having spent less than 24 hours with her.

Caserta did not see nor communicate by phone with Joplin again, although she later claimed she had tried to reach Joplin at the Landmark Motor Hotel and Sunset Sound Recorders. Caserta and Morgan lost touch with each other; each had independently made plans for Friday, October 2. Joplin mentioned her disappointment over both friends bailing out of their ménage à trois to her drug dealer on Saturday while he was selling her the dose of heroin that killed her, as Caserta later learned from the dealer. Biographer Myra Friedman commented in her original version of Buried Alive (1973):

Given the near-infinite potentials of infancy, it is really impossible to make generalizations about what lies behind sexual practices. This, however, is probable: to become clearly homosexual, to make the choice that one honestly prefers relations with one's own sex, no matter the origins of such preference, requires a certain integration, a stability of psychic development, a tidiness of personality organization. The ridicule and the humiliation that took place at that most delicate period in [Joplin's] early teens, her own inability to surmount the obstacles to regular growth, devastated her a great deal more than most people comprehended. Janis was not heir to an ego so cohesive as to permit her an identity one way or the other. She was, as [the psychiatric social worker she saw regularly in Beaumont, Texas in 1965 and 1966] Mr. [Bernard] Giarritano put it [in an interview with Friedman], "diffused" – spewing, splattering, splaying all over, without a center to hold. That had as much to do with her original use of drugs [before she first met Giarritano] as did the critical component of guilt and its multiplicity of sources above and beyond the contribution made by her relationships with women. Were she so simple as the lesbians wished her to be or so free as her associates imagined!

Kim France reported in her May 2, 1999 The New York Times article "Nothin' Left to Lose": "Once she became famous, Joplin cursed like a truck driver, did not believe in wearing undergarments, was rarely seen without her bottle of Southern Comfort and delighted in playing the role of sexual predator." On July 11, 1970, Joplin made a revealing statement about her sexuality to her friend Richard Hundgen, the Grateful Dead's San Francisco-based road manager, whom she had known since 1966. When Joplin and Hundgen were offstage during a San Diego gig for both Full Tilt Boogie and Big Brother and the Holding Company, she said the following that he later repeated to Myra Friedman:

I hear a rumor that somebody in San Francisco is spreading stories that I'm a dyke. You go back there and find out who it is and tell them that Janis says she's gotten it on with a couple of thousand cats in her life and a few hundred chicks and see what they can do with that!

Joplin's body art, with a wristlet and a small heart on her left breast by the San Francisco tattoo artist Lyle Tuttle, marked an early moment in the popular culture's acceptance of tattoos as art. Another trademark was her flamboyant hair styles, which often included colored streaks and accessories such as scarves, beads and feathers.

== Legacy ==
=== Legacy in the 1970s ===
Joplin's death in October 1970 at age 27 stunned her fans and shocked the music world, especially when coupled with the deaths of Canned Heat guitarist Alan Wilson a month earlier, and rock icon Jimi Hendrix 16 days earlier, both aged 27. All three musicians performed at the two biggest rock festivals of the 1960s: Monterey Pop Festival and Woodstock. This would later cause some people to attribute significance to the death of musicians at the age of 27, as celebrated in the "27 Club". Music historian Tom Moon wrote that Joplin had "a devastatingly original voice", music columnist Jon Pareles of The New York Times wrote that Joplin as an artist was "overpowering and deeply vulnerable" and author Megan Terry said that Joplin was the female version of Elvis Presley in her ability to captivate an audience. Joplin was noted for her powerful mezzo-soprano vocals with a distinctive rock and roll rasping vocal quality, as well as her "electric" stage presence. Her most popular songs include her cover versions of "Piece of My Heart", "Cry Baby", "Down on Me", "Ball and Chain", and "Summertime", as well as her original song "Mercedes Benz", which was her final recording.

A book about Joplin by her publicist Myra Friedman titled Buried Alive: The Biography of Janis Joplin (1973) was excerpted in many newspapers. At the same time, Peggy Caserta's memoir, Going Down With Janis (1973), attracted much attention; its provocative title is a reference to Caserta's claim that she had engaged in oral sex with Joplin while they were high on heroin in September 1970. The description provided by Dan Knapp, Caserta's co-author whom she denounced decades later, repelled many people in 1973 when few books or filmed interviews of Joplin or her loved ones were accessible to the public. Joplin's bandmate Sam Andrew described Caserta as "halfway between a groupie and a friend" in an interview with writer Ellis Amburn. Soon after the 1973 publication of Going Down With Janis, Joplin's friends learned that graphic descriptions of sexual acts and intravenous drug use were not the only portions of the book that would haunt them.

According to Kim Chappell, a close friend of Caserta and Joplin who is mentioned many times in Going Down With Janis, the 1973 publication of it angered the Los Angeles heroin dealer whom it describes in detail. The make and model of his car are included. According to Amburn, in 1973, a "carful of dope dealers" visited a Los Angeles lesbian bar that Caserta had been frequenting. Caserta was not on the premises at the time. Chappell, who was in the alley behind the bar, stated: "I was stabbed because, when Peggy's book came out, her dealer, the same one who'd given Janis her last fix, didn't like it that he was referred to and was out to get Peggy. He couldn't find her, so he went for her lover. When they realized who I was, they felt that my death would also hit Peggy, and so they stabbed me." Despite being "stabbed three times in the chest, puncturing both lungs," Chappell eventually recovered.

According to Joplin's biographers, Caserta was among many friends of Joplin who did not become clean and sober until a long time after Joplin's death, while others died from overdoses. Although the wife of Big Brother guitarist James Gurley, who was Joplin's close friend, died from a heroin overdose in 1969, devastating Joplin, Gurley himself did not become clean and sober until 1984. Caserta survived "a near-fatal OD in December 1995", wrote Alice Echols. On January 13, 2000, Caserta appeared during a segment about Joplin on 20/20. In 2018, Caserta denounced Going Down With Janis as the pornographic fantasy of Dan Knapp, her co-author, and largely unreliable. During that year, the public had its first access to her own story via a memoir she co-wrote with Maggie Falcon titled I Ran into Some Trouble. It describes a long, friendly relationship with Joplin that only occasionally featured sexuality.

Dan Knapp did write graphic descriptions of sexual acts between men and women and between two women, and went into detail about Joplin and Caserta, many months before Joplin's death, initiating a threesome with a New York man who was a "political activist." Despite Knapp's fixation, his information about Caserta avoiding Joplin on October 2, 3 and 4, 1970 is not contradicted by I Ran into Some Trouble.

The Mamas & the Papas' song "Pearl" (1971), from their album People Like Us, was a tribute to Joplin. Leonard Cohen's song "Chelsea Hotel#2" (1974) is about Joplin. Lyricist Robert Hunter has commented that Jerry Garcia's "Birdsong", from his first solo album, Garcia (1972), is about Joplin and the end of her suffering through death. Mimi Farina's composition "In the Quiet Morning", most famously covered by Joan Baez on her album Come from the Shadows (1972), was a tribute to Joplin. Another song by Baez, "Children of the Eighties", mentioned Joplin. A Serge Gainsbourg-penned French language song by English singer Jane Birkin, "Ex fan des sixties" (1978), references Joplin along with other disappeared "idols", such as Jimi Hendrix, Brian Jones and Marc Bolan. When Joplin was alive, Country Joe McDonald released a song called "Janis" on his band's album I-Feel-Like-I'm-Fixin'-to-Die (1967). In her memoir Just Kids, Patti Smith mentions writing a song for Joplin and singing it to her one night at the Chelsea Hotel, where both were living at the time. The song, called "Lullaby (I Was Working Real Hard)", was never recorded by Joplin but eventually appeared on Smith's Live At The Bottom Line, a performance from 1975.

The film The Rose (1979) is loosely based on Joplin's life. Originally planned to be titled Pearl—Joplin's nickname and the title of her last album—the film was fictionalized after her family declined to allow the producers the rights to her story. Bette Midler won the Golden Globe Award for Best Actress in a Motion Picture—Female and earned nominations for the Academy Award for Best Actress, the BAFTA Award for Best Actress in a Leading Role, the New York Film Critics Circle Award for Best Actress, and the National Society of Film Critics Award for Best Actress for her performance in the film.

=== Legacy in 1980s and 1990s ===
In 1988, on what would have been Joplin's 45th birthday, the Janis Joplin Memorial, with an original gold, multi-image sculpture of Joplin by Douglas Clark, was dedicated during a ceremony in Port Arthur, Texas. In 1992, the first major biography of Joplin in two decades, Love, Janis, authored by her younger sister Laura Joplin, was published. In an interview, Laura stated that Joplin enjoyed being on the Dick Cavett Show, that Joplin had difficulties with some, but not all, people at Thomas Jefferson High School and that Joplin enthusiastically talked about Woodstock with her parents and siblings during a visit to their Texas home a few weeks after she had performed at the festival.

In 1995, Joplin was inducted into the Rock and Roll Hall of Fame, becoming the first female solo artist to achieve it in her first year of eligibility. In 2005, she received a Grammy Lifetime Achievement Award. In November 2009, the Rock and Roll Hall of Fame and Museum honored her as part of its annual American Music Masters Series; among the artifacts at the Rock and Roll Hall of Fame Museum exhibition are Joplin's scarf and necklaces, her psychedelically painted 1965 Porsche 356 Cabriolet and a sheet of LSD blotting paper designed by Robert Crumb, designer of the Cheap Thrills cover. Also in 2009, Joplin was the honoree at the Rock Hall's American Music Master concert and lecture series. In the late 1990s, the musical play Love, Janis was created and directed by Randal Myler, with input from Janis' younger sister Laura and Big Brother guitarist Sam Andrew, with an aim to take it to Off-Broadway. Opening in the summer of 2001 and scheduled for only a few weeks of performances, the show won acclaim, played to packed houses and was held over several times.

=== Legacy after 2010 ===
In 2013 Washington's Arena Stage featured a production of A Night with Janis Joplin, starring Mary Bridget Davies in which Joplin performs a concert for the audience while telling stories of her past inspirations, including those of Odetta and Aretha Franklin. The production transferred to Broadway, then went on tour in 2016. In August 2024 the Tony-nominated musical opened at London's Peacock Theatre with Davies again in the lead role.

On November 4, 2013, Joplin was awarded with the 2,510th star on the Hollywood Walk of Fame for her contributions to the music industry. Her star is located at 6752 Hollywood Boulevard, in front of Musicians Institute. On August 8, 2014, the U.S. Postal Service revealed a commemorative stamp honoring Joplin as part of its Music Icons stamp series during a first-day-of-issue ceremony at the Outside Lands Music Festival at Golden Gate Park. Among the memorabilia Joplin left behind is a Gibson Hummingbird guitar. In 2015, the biographical documentary film Janis: Little Girl Blue, directed by Amy J. Berg and narrated by Cat Power, was released. It was a New York Times Critics' Pick.

After Rolling Stone ranked Joplin number 46 on its 2004 list of the "100 Greatest Artists of All Time" and number 28 on its 2008 list of the "100 Greatest Singers of All Time", she was then re-ranked in 2023; In 2023, Rolling Stone then ranked Joplin at number 78 on its list of the 200 Greatest Singers of All Time. Also in 2023, NPR dubbed Joplin as the "Queen of Rock" and named her one of the "50 Great Voices". As of 2013, she remains one of the top-selling vocalists in the United States, with Recording Industry Association of America (RIAA) certifications of 18.5 million albums sold.

== Influence ==
Joplin had a profound influence on many singers, including Steven Tyler and Stevie Nicks. Pink said about Joplin: "She was so inspiring by singing blues music when it wasn't culturally acceptable for white women, and she wore her heart on her sleeve. She was so witty and charming and intelligent, but she also battled an ugly-duckling syndrome." Hearing Joplin is what inspired Japanese rock pioneer Carmen Maki to switch from folk to rock music.

== Discography ==
Joplin recorded four albums in her four-year career. The first two albums were recorded with and credited to Big Brother and the Holding Company; the later two were recorded with different backing bands and released as solo albums. Posthumous releases have included previously unreleased studio and live material.

=== Studio albums ===
==== As lead singer of Big Brother and the Holding Company ====
Title	Album details	Peak chart positions	Certifications
Title	Album details	US	Certifications
Big Brother & the Holding Company	Released: August 23, 1967; Label: Mainstream	60	
Cheap Thrills	Released: August 12, 1968; Label: Columbia	1	US: 2× Platinum

==== As solo artist ====
Title	Album details	Peak chart positions									Certifications
Title	Album details	US	AUS	CAN	GER	ITA	NL	NOR	POR	UK	Certifications
I Got Dem Ol' Kozmic Blues Again Mama!	Released: September 11, 1969; Label: Columbia	5	—	4	—	—	—	—	—	—	US: Platinum; CAN: Gold
Pearl	Released: January 11, 1971; Label: Columbia	1	1	1	3	83	1	1	24	20	US: 4× Platinum; CAN: 4× Platinum; JPN: Gold; UK: Silver

=== Live albums ===
Title	Album details	Peak chart positions						Certifications
Title	Album details	US	AUS	CAN	GER	NOR	UK	Certifications
In Concert	Released: 1972; Label: Columbia	4	9	5	28	7	30	US: Gold; CAN: Gold
Wicked Woman	Released: 1976; Label: Memory	—	—	—	—	—	—	
Cheaper Thrills (with Big Brother and the Holding Company)	Released: 1984; Label: Fan Club	—	—	—	—	—	—	
Live at Winterland '68 (with Big Brother and the Holding Company)	Released: 1998; Label: Columbia/Legacy	— (Note: Live at Winterland '68 did not enter the Billboard 200, but it peaked at number 10 on Billboard's Tastemakers chart.)	—	—	—	—	—	
The Woodstock Experience	Released: 2009; Label: Sony BMG/Legacy	—	—	—	—	—	—	
Live at the Carousel Ballroom 1968 (with Big Brother and the Holding Company)	Released: 2012; Label: Columbia/Legacy	— (Note: Live at the Carousel Ballroom 1968 did not enter the Billboard 200, but it peaked at number 14 on Billboard's Tastemakers chart and at number 179 on Billboard's Current Albums Sales chart.)	—	—	—	—	—	
Woodstock: Sunday August 17, 1969	Released: 2019; Label: Legacy	— (Note: Woodstock: Sunday August 17, 1969 did not enter the Billboard 200, but it peaked at number 62 on Billboard's Current Albums Sales chart.)	—	—	—	—	—	

=== Compilation albums ===
Title	Album details	Peak chart positions										Certifications
Title	Album details	US	AUS	CAN	GER	ITA	NL	NOR	POR	SWE	UK	Certifications
Janis Joplin's Greatest Hits	Released: 1973; Label: Columbia	37	—	35	—	71	—	—	47	—	—	US: 9× Platinum; AUT: Platinum; CAN: Platinum; SWI: Gold; UK: Gold
Janis (1975)	Released: 1975; Label: Columbia	54	36	54	—	—	—	—	—	—	—	US: Gold
Farewell Song	Released: 1982; Label: Columbia	104	—	—	—	—	—	31	—	—	—	
Janis (1993)	Released: 1993; Label: Columbia/Legacy	—	—	—	—	—	—	—	—	—	—	
This Is Janis Joplin	Released: 1995; Label: no label (bootleg)	—	—	—	—	—	—	—	—	—	—	
18 Essential Songs	Released: 1995; Label: Columbia	—	—	—	—	—	—	—	—	52	—	US: Gold
The Ultimate Collection	Released: 1998; Label: Columbia	—	—	—	—	—	—	—	—	27	26	
Box of Pearls (The Janis Joplin Collection)	Released: 1999; Label: Columbia	—	—	—	—	—	—	—	—	—	—	
Super Hits	Released: 2000; Label: Columbia	113	—	—	—	—	—	—	—	—	—	US: Platinum
Love, Janis	Released: 2001; Label: Columbia	—	—	—	—	—	—	—	—	—	—	
The Essential Janis Joplin	Released: 2003; Label: Columbia	—	—	—	—	32	100	15	—	26	—	
The Lost Tapes (with Big Brother and the Holding Company)	Released: 2008; Label: Airline	—	—	—	—	—	—	—	—	—	—	
Playlist: The Very Best of Janis Joplin	Released: 2010; Label: Columbia	—	—	—	—	—	—	—	—	—	—	
Move Over!	Released: 2011; Label: Columbia	—	—	—	—	—	—	—	—	—	—	
Blow All My Blues Away	Released: 2012; Label: no label (bootleg)	—	—	—	—	—	—	—	—	—	—	
The Pearl Sessions	Released: 2012; Label: Columbia	—	—	—	—	—	—	—	—	—	—	
Janis: Little Girl Blue (Original Soundtrack)	Released: 2016; Label: Columbia	—	—	—	—	—	—	—	—	—	—	

=== Singles ===
==== As lead of Big Brother and the Holding Company ====
Title	Year	Peak chart positions			Certifications	Album
Title	Year	US	CAN	FRA	Certifications	Album
"Blindman" (B-side: "All Is Loneliness") Mainstream 657	1966	110	—	—		Big Brother & the Holding Company
"Down on Me" (B-side: "Call on Me") Mainstream 662	1967	43	—	—		Big Brother & the Holding Company
"Bye, Bye Baby" (B-side: "Intruder") Mainstream 666	1967	118	—	—		Big Brother & the Holding Company
"Women Is Losers" (B-side: "Light Is Faster Than Sound") Mainstream 675	1967	—	—	—		Big Brother & the Holding Company
"Coo Coo" (B-side: "The Last Time") Mainstream 678	1968	84	—	—		Big Brother & the Holding Company
"Piece of My Heart" (B-side: "Turtle Blues") Columbia 4-44626	1968	12	9	50	US: Platinum; ITA: Gold	Cheap Thrills

==== As solo artist ====
Title	Year	Peak chart positions								Certifications	Album
Title	Year	US	AUS	AUT	CAN	FRA	GER	NL	SWI	Certifications	Album
"Kozmic Blues" (B-side: "Little Girl Blue")	1969	41	—	—	33	136	—	—	—		I Got Dem Ol' Kozmic Blues Again Mama!
"Try (Just a Little Bit Harder)" (B-side: "One Good Man")	1970	103	—	—	89	—	—	—	—		I Got Dem Ol' Kozmic Blues Again Mama!
"Maybe" (B-side: "Work Me, Lord")	1970	110	—	—	—	—	—	—	—		I Got Dem Ol' Kozmic Blues Again Mama!
"Me and Bobby McGee" (B-side: "Half Moon")	1971	1	1	7	6	—	8	11	3	US: Platinum	Pearl
"Cry Baby" (B-side: "Mercedes Benz") (Note: "Mercedes Benz" is certified gold in the US.)	1971	42	—	—	22	—	—	12	—		Pearl
"Get It While You Can" (B-side: "Move Over")	1971	78	—	—	51	—	—	—	—		Pearl
"Down on Me" (B-side: "Bye, Bye Baby")	1972	91	—	—	74	—	—	—	—		In Concert

== Filmography ==
- Monterey Pop (1968)
- Petulia (1968)
- Janis Joplin and Her Group (1969)
- Janis Joplin Live in Frankfurt (1969)
- Janis (1974)
- Janis: The Way She Was (1974)
- Comin' Home (1988)
- Woodstock – The Lost Performances (1991)
- Woodstock: 3 Days of Peace & Music (Director's Cut) (1994)
- Festival Express (2003)
- Nine Hundred Nights (2004)
- The Dick Cavett Show: Rock Icons (2005) Shout Factory
- Rockin' at the Red Dog: The Dawn of Psychedelic Rock (2005)
- This is Tom Jones (2007) 1969 appearance on TV show
- Woodstock: 3 Days of Peace & Music (Director's Cut) 40th Anniversary Edition (2009)
- Janis Joplin with Big Brother: Ball and Chain (DVD) Charly (2009)
- Janis: Little Girl Blue (2015)
