= Festival Express =

2003 rockumentary

- The movie poster
- Directed by: Bob Smeaton
- Produced by: Gavin Poolman; John Trapman
- Starring: Janis Joplin; Grateful Dead; The Band; Delaney and Bonnie; Buddy Guy
- Cinematography: Peter Biziou; Bob Fiore; Clarke Mackey
- Edited by: Eamonn Power
- Production companies: Apollo Films; PeachTree Films
- Distributed by: Optimum Releasing
- Release dates: September 9, 2003 (Toronto Film Festival); September 3, 2004 (United Kingdom)
- Running time: 90 minutes
- Country: United Kingdom
- Language: English

Festival Express is a 2003 British documentary film about the 1970 train tour of the same name across Canada taken by some of North America's most popular rock bands, including Grateful Dead, Janis Joplin, The Band, Buddy Guy, Flying Burrito Bros, Ian & Sylvia's Great Speckled Bird, Mountain and Delaney & Bonnie & Friends. The film combines footage of the 1970 concerts and on the train, interspersed with contemporary recollections of the tour by its participants.

The film, released by THINKFilm in the United States and Optimum Releasing in the United Kingdom, was produced by Gavin Poolman (son of the original 1970 film shoot's producer, Willem Poolman) together with John Trapman, and directed by double Grammy Award-winner Bob Smeaton, with music produced by Eddie Kramer and featuring original footage shot in 1970 by Academy Award–winning cinematographer Peter Biziou. The original 1970 footage was filmed by director Frank Cvitanovich. A DVD release followed the film's 2003 theatrical run.

== Concert tour ==
Festival Express was staged in three Canadian cities: Toronto, Winnipeg and Calgary, during the summer of 1970. Rather than flying into each city, the musicians traveled by chartered Canadian National Railways train, in a total of 14 cars (two engines, one diner, five sleepers, two lounge cars, two flat cars, one baggage car, and one staff car). The train journey between cities ultimately became a combination of non-stop jam sessions and partying fueled by alcohol. One highlight of the documentary is a drunken jam session featuring The Band's Rick Danko, the Grateful Dead's Jerry Garcia and Bob Weir, New Riders of the Purple Sage's John Dawson, as well as Janis Joplin.

The event, initially billed as the Transcontinental Pop Festival, was developed and conceived by Ken Walker and promoted by Eaton-Walker Associates (consisting of Thor Eaton, George Eaton, and Ken Walker) and the concerts were produced and financed together with Industrial and Trade Shows of Canada (ITS) division of MacLean-Hunter Publishing Company and originally included the following cities:

Transcontinental Pop Festival Venues
Date	City	Venue	Time	Admission	Attendance	Comments
June 24, 1970 (St. Jean-Baptiste Day)	Montreal	Autostade	12PM-12AM (planned)	$12 ($10 advance) (planned)	N/A	Originally planned for June 20–21, but was changed to June 24; show was cancelled by the city in mid-June, 1970, a few weeks prior to event
June 27–28, 1970	Toronto	Exhibition Stadium (aka CNE Grandstand and CNE Exhibition Stadium)	12PM-12AM	One Day – $10 ($9 advance); Two Day – $16 ($14 advance)	37,000	
July 1, 1970 (Canada Day)	Winnipeg	Winnipeg Stadium	12PM-12AM	$12 ($10 advance)	4,600	
July 4–5, 1970	Calgary	McMahon Stadium	12PM-12AM	One Day – $10 ($9 advance); Two Day – $16 ($14 advance)	20,000	
July 4–5, 1970	Vancouver	PNE Empire Stadium	N/A	N/A	N/A	Venue could not be secured from the city and Vancouver was dropped from the tour in mid-April, 1970

The Montreal event was cancelled a few weeks before the scheduled date by Lucien Saulnier, chairman of the City of Montreal Executive Committee (and acting under authority of mayor Jean Drapeau), because it clashed with St. Jean-Baptiste Day (June 24) celebrations and there were concerns about a diluted security force and the potential for violence. Buses were run from Montreal to the Toronto Festival Express stop and Montreal tickets were honored in Toronto. The Vancouver venue, Pacific National Exhibition (PNE) Empire Stadium, could not be secured as they were scheduled to have artificial turf (Tartan Turf) installed shortly before the scheduled event, and there was concern about damage to the turf. In March, 1970, Walker requested use of an alternate venue, Capilano Stadium, for the event, but this was denied by the Vancouver City Council over several concerns, including inadequate sanitary and food facilities, challenges with policing the event, and vagrancy. Therefore, Vancouver was dropped from the tour, and Calgary was subsequently added. The event in Calgary was initially to be held in an open field, Paskapoo Ski Hill (to later become Canada Olympic Park), but the city requested it be held at McMahon Stadium instead, as it would permit better organization and security.

The tour ultimately began in Toronto at the CNE Grandstand, which was plagued with about 2,500 protestors who objected to what they viewed as exploitation by promoters charging $14 per ticket. The opposition was organized by the May 4th Movement (M4M), the left-rebel group that grew out of the May 4, 1970 Kent State shootings. They attempted to crash the gates and scale the fence, and clashed with police, resulting in injuries to both protesters and policemen. To help calm the crowd, Metro Police Inspector Walter Magahay asked the promoter, Ken Walker, to lower ticket prices, but this would have left the promoters unable to pay the musicians. Subsequently, Jerry Garcia, in conjunction with Magahay, was instrumental in calming the unruly crowd by arranging a spontaneous free "rehearsal" concert in nearby Coronation Park upon a flatbed truck, while the scheduled show continued at the stadium. Once the free concert, which began at about 7:00pm on June 27, was announced, most of the ticketless fans dispersed to Coronation Park, with an initial attendance of about 6,000, thereby resolving the protest. Once the show at the CNE Grandstand ended at 12:30am, another 6,000 fans went to the park for the remainder of the free concert, which lasted until about 4:00am on June 28. Playing at Coronation Park were The Grateful Dead, Ian & Sylvia and the Great Speckled Bird, James and the Good Brothers, the New Riders of the Purple Sage (all of whom also performed at the CNE concert). Other local Toronto bands also played, including January, The People's Revolutionary Concert Band, Si Potma and P.M. Howard (of Beatlemania fame). There are some reports indicating a free concert was also performed on the second day, albeit to a much smaller crowd of about 500, as many of the protesters paid admission to the event on the second day. Many people spent the night and following day sleeping in the park until the second show at CNE Grandstand ended at 12:30am on June 29.

On the way to Winnipeg, the second stop on the tour, the train stopped in Chapleau, Ontario, to replenish its dwindling alcohol supply, buying out the entire stock of a small liquor store. The Winnipeg show had only a modest turnout of 4,600, partly due to fears about crowd violence based on the events in Toronto and partly due to the Manitoba Centennial appearance by Prime Minister Trudeau. The event was not plagued by protests or violence, however.

In Calgary, the third and final stop, the police wished to avoid the protests witnessed in Toronto and their presence seemed to subdue the crowds outside the stadium, though there were many complaints about the ticket prices. It was estimated that about 1,000 people managed to sneak in on Saturday by climbing fences early in the day, but security was tightened, and by the afternoon and Sunday, fewer people managed to breach the fences. However, there was a heated altercation between promoter Ken Walker and Calgary mayor Rod Sykes after Sykes strongly suggested to Walker on Sunday afternoon that he open the gates and let the kids in free after the show was well underway. Walker, who was livid about the mayor's intrusion and his reference to Walker as "Eastern scum" "trying to skim" the young people of Calgary, claimed to have punched the mayor in the mouth, and boasted that he still had a scar on his hand to prove it.

The tour had an original budget of about $900,000 (of which $500,000 was for musical talent), but largely due to less than predicted turnout, gross receipts were just over $500,000 and the project ultimately lost between $350,000 and $500,000 for the promoters. Although the tour was a financial failure, it produced many notable performances, including some of the final performances by Janis Joplin, who would die about three months after the end of the tour. In the film, Mickey Hart of the Grateful Dead said, "Woodstock was a treat for the audience, but the train was a treat for the performers." Jerry Garcia later said that what he remembers most about the tour is being "so blisteringly drunk".

== Songs ==
=== Performed in the film ===
- "Don't Ease Me In", Grateful Dead
- "Friend of the Devil", Grateful Dead
- "Slippin' and Slidin'", The Band
- "Comin' Home Baby", Mashmakhan
- "Money (That's What I Want)", Buddy Guy Blues Band
- "Lazy Days", The Flying Burrito Brothers
- "The Weight", The Band
- "Cry Baby", Janis Joplin
- "Ain't No More Cane", jam session on train including Rick Danko, John Dawson, Janis Joplin, Jerry Garcia and Bob Weir
- "Rock & Roll Is Here to Stay", performed by Sha Na Na
- "New Speedway Boogie", Grateful Dead
- "C.C. Rider", Ian & Sylvia and the Great Speckled Bird (with Jerry Garcia and Delaney Bramlett)
- "I Shall Be Released", The Band
- "Tell Mama", Janis Joplin
- "Me and Bobby McGee", Janis Joplin
- "Cold Jordan", Jerry Garcia
- "Goin' Down the Road Feelin' Bad", Delaney & Bonnie & Friends

=== Additional songs on DVD ===
- "Casey Jones", Grateful Dead (opening credits)
- "13 Questions", Seatrain
- "Child's Song", Tom Rush
- "Thirsty Boots", Eric Andersen
- "As the Years Go By", Mashmakhan
- "Tears of Rage", Ian & Sylvia and Great Speckled Bird
- "Hoochie Coochie Man", Buddy Guy Blues Band
- "Hard to Handle", Grateful Dead
- "Easy Wind", Grateful Dead
- "Move Over", Janis Joplin
- "Kozmic Blues", Janis Joplin

=== Other Festival Express performances ===
- Audio recordings of Janis Joplin's performances from all three shows have surfaced on various posthumous releases. Starting with the 1972 double live album, Joplin In Concert, which consisted of Festival Express recordings on its second disc, and culminating with Live From The Festival Express Tour, Canada, released as a bonus disc for the 2005 deluxe reissue of her 1971 album, Pearl. The 13 track disc collected many of the previously released recordings, along with 6 which were previously unreleased. Five filmed performances ("Tell Mama", "Kozmic Blues", "Cry Baby", "Try (Just A Little Bit Harder)" and "Move Over") were featured in the 1974 film, Janis.
- Filmed performances of "Long Black Veil" and "Rockin' Chair", from July 5, 1970, in Calgary appear on The Band's anthology album, A Musical History.

== Other festival performers ==
These festival performers were not featured in the film or DVD extras:

- Robert Charlebois
- Delaney & Bonnie & Friends (Delaney Bramlett sits in with Great Speckled Bird during "C.C. Rider" and Bonnie Bramlett can be seen on the train; their saxophonist Jerry Jumonville also appears.) Except immediately above, it says they WERE featured.
- The Ides of March
- James and The Good Brothers
- Mountain (member Leslie West can be seen jamming at the beginning of the film)
- Ten Years After (performed only in Toronto; performances of "I'm Goin' Home" and "Slow Blues in C" were filmed, but according to film producer Gavin Poolman in May 2011, lead guitarist and singer Alvin Lee wouldn't approve their appearance in the film, saying he thought his guitar was out of tune)
- Traffic (performed only in Toronto; on the DVD, promoter Ken Walker states that Traffic was on the train, but the band's record company wouldn't allow them to appear in the film. Two performances were filmed; however, according to film producer Gavin Poolman in May 2011, Steve Winwood's management refused permission for these to appear in the film.)
- The New Riders of the Purple Sage, which, in mid-1970, featured Jerry Garcia on pedal-steel guitar, as well as Mickey Hart as occasional percussionist. Also, John Dawson is seen in the "Ain't No More Cane" scene, sitting on the couch with Rick Danko and Janis Joplin, as they work through several drunken verses of the tune. Buddy Cage can also be seen, performing as a member of Great Speckled Bird.

== Film production ==
Because the Festival Express tour turned out to be a complete financial disaster, the promoters injuncted the film footage and the film project was shelved soon afterwards, as the footage mysteriously disappeared. Some of the film's reels turned up in the garage of the original producer Willem Poolman, where they had been stored for decades and used at various times as goal posts for ball hockey games played by his son Gavin when he was a teenager.

The plan to resurrect the film was started in 1999 by executive producer Garth Douglas and story consultant James Cullingham, who found many more reels in the Canadian National Film Archives vault, where it had been kept in pristine condition, unknown to the world. Garth got in touch with Gavin, who had grown up to become a film producer based in London, England. Gavin put the film together with his old high school friend John Trapman, and Bob Smeaton, double Grammy Award-winning director of The Beatles Anthology, was brought on board.

The music tracks were mixed at Toronto's MetalWorks Studios and produced by Eddie Kramer, Jimi Hendrix's producer, and engineer for Led Zeppelin, Woodstock, and Derek & The Dominos Live In Concert. The film was produced by London-based Apollo Films (a division of Apollo Media) together with PeachTree Films in Amsterdam.

== Release ==
=== Premieres and festivals ===
Festival Express had its world premiere at the 2003 Toronto International Film Festival. Other festival releases included the San Francisco Film Festival, International Film Festival Rotterdam, Bermuda Film Festival, London Film Festival, Miami Film Festival, Wisconsin Film Festival, NatFilm Festival, Karlovy Vary Film Festival, Maine International Film Festival, Flanders International Film Festival, the IN-EDIT Barcelona International Music Documentary Film Festival, Hohaiyan Music Film Festival, Rio Film Festival, Vienna International Film Festival and the São Paulo International Film Festival.

The film was released theatrically on July 23, 2004, in the United States, as well as in Canada, the United Kingdom, Australia, New Zealand, Japan, The Netherlands, Luxembourg, Belgium, and Scandinavia.

== Reception ==
On review aggregator website Rotten Tomatoes, the film holds an approval rating of 96% based on 80 reviews, with an average rating of 7.7/10.

== Home media ==
A two-disc DVD for Region 1 was released on November 2, 2004, by New Line Home Video.

A two-disc DVD for Region 4 was released in Australia in 2005 by Magna Pacific.

A Blu-ray disc for Region 1 was released in 2014 by Shout Factory.

=== Box-office reception ===
The film earned $1.2 million at the US Box Office, and the DVD went straight in at number 1 on the Music Video & Concert DVD top-sellers charts at Amazon.com, Barnes & Noble, Tower Records, etc., and has had an average customer review rating of 4.5 stars out of 5. According to Rotten Tomatoes, Festival Express was the second most critically acclaimed film released in 2004.

== Legacy ==
Edward Sharpe and the Magnetic Zeros joined The Railroad Revival Tour in April 2011 with Mumford and Sons and Old Crow Medicine Show. Traveling in vintage rail cars, the three bands performed in six "unique outdoor locations" over the course of a week starting in Oakland, California. The musical documentary Big Easy Express, which was made of the trip and directed by Emmett Malloy, premiered March 2012 at the South by Southwest Film Conference and Festival (SXSW Film) in Austin, Texas.

== See also ==
- Grateful Dead lyricist Robert Hunter was on the trip, and soon after wrote "Might as Well", a song filled with imagery from the legendary trip that was often played live by Grateful Dead, but released as a studio tune on the 1976 Jerry Garcia solo album Reflections.
