= Peggy Caserta =

American businesswoman and memoirist (1940–2024)

- Born: Peggy Louise Caserta; September 12, 1940; Covington, Louisiana, U.S.
- Died: November 21, 2024 (aged 84); Tillamook, Oregon, U.S.
- Education: Perkinston Junior College San Francisco State University
- Occupations: Businesswoman; memoirist

Peggy Louise Caserta (September 12, 1940 – November 21, 2024) was an American businesswoman and memoirist. She owned Mnasidika, a boutique in San Francisco's Haight-Ashbury district that became a hub for the counterculture of the 1960s, and published two memoirs, including one detailing her relationship with singer Janis Joplin.

== Early life ==
Peggy Louise Caserta was born on September 12, 1940, in Covington, Louisiana. She was the only child of Sam and Novell Caserta; her father worked as a postal employee. Her childhood was marked by frequent relocations with her family, moving from Louisiana to Mississippi, Alabama, Georgia, and eventually to Texas. While attending grade school in Texas, she became friends with Lee Harvey Oswald. Caserta excelled in her early academic pursuits, serving as homecoming queen at Covington High School and graduating as an honor student.

She later attended Perkinston Junior College where she earned an associate degree. Following college, Caserta took a job with Delta Air Lines, aspiring to become a flight attendant. However, she suffered from airsickness, which led to her reassignment to desk jobs in New York City and later in San Francisco.

== Career ==
After taking some night classes at San Francisco State University, Caserta opened Mnasidika, a boutique in the Haight-Ashbury neighborhood of San Francisco in 1964. The store at 1510 Haight Street was named after the lover of ancient Greek poet Sappho, and a character in a lesbian poetry collection, The Songs of Bilitis. She secured the space for US$87.50 (equivalent to $908.33 in 2025) per month using money borrowed from her parents. Initially, the store sold blazers, blouses, and shirts made by Caserta's mother, complete with a custom tag was sewn into each one: “Made especially for you by Novell”. Novell Caserta shipped the items for free via Delta Air Lines, where Peggy Caserta was employed at the time.

The boutique became a social hub for the counterculture of the 1960s, attracting musicians, artists, and others involved in the hippie movement. Among her clients were members of the Grateful Dead, Jimi Hendrix, Jefferson Airplane, Kris Kristofferson, and Sly Stone. Caserta became embedded in the Haight-Ashbury community, selling concert tickets for The Avalon and Bill Graham's Fillmore shows, and LSD for Owsley Stanley. In 1966, Caserta met singer Janis Joplin, and the two formed a close friendship that included elements of a romantic relationship. They often used heroin together and collaborated on potential business ventures, including plans for a production company called Honeysuckle Productions.

Caserta expanded Mnasidika by purchasing a neighboring barbershop and converting it into a space for handmade sandals and boots by her friend Bobby Boles. She also began stocking jeans from Levi Strauss & Co. Caserta hired a local artisan to create customized Levi's jeans with added flared inserts. When demand for the bell-bottoms exceeded supply, she approached the Levi Strauss & Co. factory, where an employee facilitated the production of flared jeans exclusively for Mnasidika. The partnership lasted through 1968, during which Caserta sold hundreds of pairs, inspiring Levi's to launch its 646 Bell Bottom jean in 1969.

In 1973, Caserta published Going Down with Janis, co-written with a ghostwriter. The book described her relationship with Joplin and their involvement in the drug-fueled rock scene of the 1960s. It was widely criticized, and Caserta later disavowed the work, attributing its sensationalist tone to the ghostwriter. The memoir has been recognized for its early portrayal of bisexuality and its role in discussions of Joplin's personal life.

Her later years were marked by legal troubles and addiction. Caserta engaged in drug-related activities, including prescription fraud, and served time in both Mexican and U.S. prisons. She described these experiences in her second memoir, I Ran into Some Trouble, published in 2018, which offered a reflective account of her life and sought to clarify her role in Joplin's life and death.

== Personal life and death ==
Caserta openly identified as a lesbian at a time when such visibility was rare. Her sexuality and drug use often placed her at odds with members of Joplin's inner circle, who blamed her for Joplin's relapse into heroin use. She faced public criticism following Joplin's death in 1970, as some accused her of contributing to Joplin's substance abuse. Caserta denied responsibility, asserting that Joplin had been using heroin before they met.

Caserta spent 12 years caring for her ailing mother in Louisiana before returning to California, where she consulted on projects about Joplin, including a biopic. She achieved sobriety in 2004 and continued to share her experiences in interviews and writings. Caserta died at her cabin in Tillamook, Oregon, on November 21, 2024, at the age of 84. She was survived by her partner, Jackie Mendelson.
