= The Lost Tapes (Big Brother and the Holding Company album) =

Compilation album by Big Brother and the Holding Company
- Released: 2008
- Recorded: 1966–1968
- Genre: Psychedelic rock, acid rock, blues rock
- Label: Airline
- Producer: David Getz

The Lost Tapes is a two-disc compilation album by the San Francisco psychedelic rock band Big Brother and the Holding Company with Janis Joplin as lead singer. The material on the first disc consists of a show at The Matrix on January 31, 1967 that is previously unreleased. The second disc consists primarily of a show at The California Hall on July 28, 1966 that had first seen release in 1984 as Cheaper Thrills, with the final track "Hall Of The Mountain King" taken from a KQED TV broadcast on April 25, 1967.

== Track listing ==
Disc One

1. "Bye, Bye Baby" - 4:10
2. "Great White Guru" - 5:46
3. "Women Is Losers" - 5:09
4. "Oh My Soul" - 2:34
5. "Amazing Grace" - 11:30
6. "Caterpillar" - 4:11
7. "It's a Deal" - 2:13
8. "Hi Heel Sneakers" - 3:36
9. "Faster Pussycat Kill Kill" - 2:22
10. "Turtle Blues" - 6:46
11. "All Is Loneliness" - 9:04
12. "Light Is Faster Than Sound" - 6:26

Disc Two

1. "(Come On Baby) Let the Good Times Roll" - 2:37
2. "I Know You Rider" - 3:13
3. "Moanin' at Midnight" - 4:57
4. "Hey Baby" - 2:50
5. "Down on Me" - 2:45
6. "Whisperman" - 1:46
7. "Women Is Losers" - 3:48
8. "Blow My Mind" - 2:34
9. "Oh My Soul" - 2:34
10. "Ball and Chain" - 6:43
11. "Coo-Coo" - 2:30
12. "Gutra's Garden" - 4:36
13. "Harry" - 0:37
14. "Hall of the Mountain King" - 6:51

== Personnel ==
Big Brother and the Holding Company

- Janis Joplin - vocals, maracas
- James Gurley - guitar
- Sam Andrew - guitar
- Peter Albin - bass, vocals
- David Getz - drums
