= Full Tilt Boogie Band =

Canadian rock band (1969–1970)

Full Tillt Boogie Band
- Origin: Stratford, Ontario; Woodstock, Ontario, Canada
- Genres: Rock, Psychedelic rock
- Years active: 1969–1970
- Label: Columbia
- Past members: Janis Joplin; John Till; Richard Bell; Clark Pierson; Brad Campbell; Ken Pearson

Full Tilt Boogie Band was a Canadian rock band originally headed by guitarist John Till and then by vocalist Janis Joplin until her death in 1970. The band was composed of Till, pianist Richard Bell, bassist Brad Campbell, drummer Clark Pierson, and organist Ken Pearson.

== History ==
=== Origins in Canada ===
In its original late 1960s incarnation, the Full Tillt Boogie Band Till played in the group as a side project from his usual gigs as a New York City studio musician. Like Till, the other members of the band were Canadians, mostly hailing from Stratford and Woodstock, Ontario, Canada. Richard Bell was recruited by Michael Friedman back stage at a Ronnie Hawkins gig at the Fillmore East in 1969. Friedman was Albert Grossman's assistant at the time. He went backstage after the gig and approached Bell. Ronnie Hawkins got wind of it and almost got into a fight with Friedman.

=== Partial group as Janis Joplin's backing band ===
When Joplin's management convinced her to discard Big Brother and the Holding Company as her backing band, her record label put together a new group of musicians for her. This group, dubbed the Kozmic Blues Band, consisted of Till and several other Full Tillt Boogie Band members – all studio musicians whom her label was familiar with and felt were reliable – plus a horn section. However, Joplin was not happy touring with some of the group members, feeling them to be too "square", and the disappointing reviews of their 1969 album I Got Dem Ol' Kozmic Blues Again Mama! led her to scrap everyone in the group except Till.

=== Entire group as Joplin's backing band ===
Till soon convinced Joplin to hire his Full Tillt Boogie Band in its entirety, and he agreed to drop one of the "L's" from its name, thus creating Joplin's Full Tilt Boogie backing band. Joplin took a more active role in putting together the Full Tilt Boogie Band than she had with the Kozmic Blues Band, and she believed that hiring the remainder of Till's band would provide her with the powerhouse boogie outfit she needed to back her. Joplin was quoted as saying, "Full Tilt Boogie Band is my band. Finally, it's my band!"

=== Touring with other acts ===
Full Tilt Boogie Band played their first session with Joplin on April 4, 1970, at the Fillmore West studios in San Francisco, California and began touring in May 1970. From June 28 to July 4, 1970, Joplin and Full Tilt joined the all-star Festival Express tour through Canada, performing alongside the Grateful Dead, Delaney and Bonnie, Rick Danko and The Band, Eric Andersen, and Ian & Sylvia. They played concerts in Toronto, Winnipeg, and Calgary.

The group's last public performance took place on August 12, 1970, at Harvard Stadium in Boston, Massachusetts. A positive review appeared on the front page of The Harvard Crimson newspaper despite the fact that the band performed with makeshift sound amplifiers after their regular equipment was stolen in Boston.

=== Last release by Joplin and her death ===
During September 1970, Joplin and Full Tilt Boogie Band began recording a new album in Los Angeles, California with record producer Paul A. Rothchild, who had produced The Doors. Although Joplin died three months before all the tracks were fully completed, there was still enough usable material to compile an LP, which became her second solo album Pearl, released posthumously in January 1971.
