= Pearl (Janis Joplin album) =

Studio album by Janis Joplin and the Full Tilt Boogie Band
- Released: January 11, 1971
- Recorded: July 27 – October 4, 1970
- Studios: Sunset Sound, Hollywood, California
- Genres: Blues; soul; R&B
- Length: 34:09
- Label: Columbia
- Producer: Paul A. Rothchild

Janis Joplin and the Full Tilt Boogie Band chronology
I Got Dem Ol' Kozmic Blues Again Mama! (1969)	Pearl (1971)	In Concert (1972)

Singles from Pearl
- 1. "Me and Bobby McGee / Half Moon" Released: January 12, 1971; 2. "Cry Baby / Mercedes Benz" Released: April 23, 1971; 3. "Get It While You Can / Move Over" Released: August 21, 1971

Pearl is the second and final solo album by the American singer Janis Joplin, released on January 11, 1971, by Columbia Records, three months after Joplin's death. It was the final album with Joplin's direct participation, and her only one recorded with the Full Tilt Boogie Band, her final touring unit. It peaked at No. 1 on the Billboard 200, holding that spot for nine weeks. Pearl was certified quadruple Platinum by the Recording Industry Association of America (RIAA). It was ranked number 259 on Rolling Stone magazine's 2020 list of the "500 Greatest Albums of All Time".

== Content ==
The album has a more polished sound than those Joplin recorded with Big Brother and the Holding Company and the Kozmic Blues Band, due to the expertise of producer Paul A. Rothchild and new backing musicians. Rothchild was best known as the recording studio producer of the Doors, and worked well with Joplin, calling her a "producer's dream". The album was recorded at Sunset Sound Recorders in Los Angeles.

The Full Tilt Boogie Band were the musicians who accompanied her on the Festival Express, a concert tour of Canada by train, in the summer of 1970. Many of the songs on this album were recorded on the concert stage in Canada two months before Joplin and the band started their LA recording sessions. The band also appeared twice on The Dick Cavett Show and played many American cities before and after Festival Express, though no recordings of those concerts were officially released.

All nine tracks Joplin sings on were approved and arranged by Joplin. Pearl features the number one hit "Me and Bobby McGee", written by Kris Kristofferson and Fred Foster (Joplin played acoustic guitar on this track); "Trust Me", by Bobby Womack, written for Joplin; Howard Tate's "Get It While You Can", showcasing her vocal range; and the original songs "Move Over" and "Mercedes Benz", the latter co-written by Joplin, Bobby Neuwirth, and Michael McClure.

Joplin sang on all tracks except "Buried Alive in the Blues", which was a backing track on which she had not yet recorded vocals. The song's writer, Nick Gravenites, was offered the chance to sing it as a tribute to Joplin but turned it down, so the song ended up as an instrumental. He later sang it with Joplin's former band Big Brother and the Holding Company for their 1971 album How Hard It Is. The recording sessions, starting in early September, ended with Joplin's untimely death in 1970. Her final session, which took place Thursday, October 1, after a break of several days, yielded her a cappella "Mercedes Benz." It was the last song she recorded before her death.

The album cover, photographed by Barry Feinstein in Los Angeles, shows Joplin reclining on her Victorian-era loveseat with a drink in her hand.

== Release and reception ==
Professional ratings
Review scores
Source	Rating
AllMusic	5/5 stars
Rolling Stone	(favorable)
The Rolling Stone Album Guide	4/5 stars
The Village Voice	A−

In 2003, the album was ranked number 122 on Rolling Stone magazine's list of The 500 Greatest Albums of All Time, moving to 125 in a 2012 revised listing. It was moved to a 259 ranking in the 2020 list. In 2010, the album was inducted into the Grammy Hall of Fame.

=== Reissues ===
In 1993, Columbia reissued the album on 24kt gold CD as part of their MasterSound series; this edition was remastered by Vic Anesini using the Super Bit Mapping process. In 1999 it was remastered again for the Box Of Pearls box set; this version was also mastered by Vic Anesini. It included four previously unreleased live recordings from the Festival Express Tour, recorded on July 4, 1970, as bonus tracks; it was also released as a standalone release.

A two-disc Legacy Edition was released on June 14, 2005, with six bonus tracks including a birthday message to John Lennon of "Happy Trails," and a reunion of the Full Tilt Boogie Band in an instrumental tribute to Joplin. The second disc included an expanded set from the Festival Express Tour, recorded between June 28 and July 4, 1970. The album was again reissued again in 2012 as The Pearl Sessions. It contains the original album, six mono mixes, two live tracks and alternate takes of the songs that constituted the Pearl album when Columbia Records released it in 1971. Recordings of Joplin and Paul Rothchild talking between takes give the listener insight into their creative process.

In 2016, Mobile Fidelity Sound Lab released the album on SACD and double 45 RPM vinyl; the SACD was mastered by Rob LoVerde, while the vinyl was cut by Kreig Wunderlich assisted by LoVerde.

== Track listing ==
Side one
No.	Title	Writer(s)	Length
1.	"Move Over"	Janis Joplin	3:39
2.	"Cry Baby"	Jerry Ragovoy, Bert Berns	3:55
3.	"A Woman Left Lonely"	Dan Penn, Spooner Oldham	3:27
4.	"Half Moon"	John Hall, Johanna Hall	3:51
5.	"Buried Alive in the Blues"	Nick Gravenites	2:24

Side two
No.	Title	Writer(s)	Length
1.	"My Baby"	Jerry Ragovoy, Mort Shuman	3:44
2.	"Me and Bobby McGee"	Kris Kristofferson, Fred Foster	4:28
3.	"Mercedes Benz"	Janis Joplin, Bob Neuwirth, Michael McClure	1:46
4.	"Trust Me"	Bobby Womack	3:15
5.	"Get It While You Can"	Jerry Ragovoy, Mort Shuman (Howard Tate 1966 rendition)	3:23

1999 bonus tracks
No.	Title	Writer(s)	Length
11.	"Tell Mama" (Festival Express Tour, July 4, 1970)	Clarence Carter, Marcus Daniel, Wilbur Terrell	6:32
12.	"Little Girl Blue" (Festival Express Tour, July 4, 1970)	Richard Rodgers, Lorenz Hart	3:50
13.	"Try (Just a Little Bit Harder)" (Festival Express Tour, July 4, 1970)	Jerry Ragovoy, Chip Taylor	6:52
14.	"Cry Baby" (Festival Express Tour, July 4, 1970)	Jerry Ragovoy, Bert Berns	6:29

2005 Legacy Edition bonus tracks
No.	Title	Writer(s)	Length
11.	"Happy Birthday, John (Happy Trails)"	Dale Evans	1:12
12.	"Me and Bobby McGee" (demo version)	Kristofferson, Foster	4:46
13.	"Move Over" (alternate version)	Joplin	4:27
14.	"Cry Baby" (alternate version)	Ragovoy, Berns	4:59
15.	"My Baby" (alternate version)	Ragovoy, Shuman	3:59
16.	"Pearl" (instrumental)	Full Tilt Boogie Band	4:29

2005 Legacy Edition Disc Two – Live from the Festival Express Tour
No.	Title	Writer(s)	Length
1.	"Tell Mama" (Toronto, June 28, 1970)	Clarence Carter, Marcus Daniel, Wilbur Terrell	6:49
2.	"Half Moon" (Toronto)	John Hall, Johanna Hall	4:38
3.	"Move Over" (Calgary, July 4, 1970)	Janis Joplin	4:41
4.	"Maybe" (Winnipeg, July 1, 1970)	Richard Barrett	3:57
5.	"Summertime" (Winnipeg)	Ira Gershwin, DuBose Heyward, George Gershwin	4:39
6.	"Little Girl Blue" (Calgary)	Richard Rodgers, Lorenz Hart	5:10
7.	"That's Rock 'n' Roll" (Toronto)	Full Tilt Boogie Band	5:03
8.	"Try (Just a Little Bit Harder)" (Toronto)	Jerry Ragovoy, Chip Taylor	9:11
9.	"Kozmic Blues" (Toronto)	Janis Joplin, Gabriel Mekler	5:29
10.	"Piece of My Heart" (Toronto)	Jerry Ragovoy, Bert Berns	5:21
11.	"Cry Baby" (Toronto)	Jerry Ragovoy, Bert Berns	6:31
12.	"Get It While You Can" (Calgary)	Jerry Ragovoy, Mort Shuman	7:20
13.	"Ball and Chain" (Calgary)	Willie Mae Thornton	8:15

== Personnel ==
Full Tilt Boogie Band

- Janis Joplin – vocals, acoustic guitar on "Me and Bobby McGee"
- Richard Bell – piano
- Ken Pearson – Hammond organ
- John Till – electric guitar
- Brad Campbell – bass guitar
- Clark Pierson – drums

Additional personnel

- Bobby Womack – acoustic guitar on "Trust Me"
- Bobbye Hall – bongos, congas
- Phil Badella, John Cooke, Vince Mitchell – backing vocals
- Sandra Crouch – tambourine

Technical

- Paul A. Rothchild – producer
- Phil Macy – engineer
- Vic Anesini – mastering for 1999 reissue, 2005 Legacy edition and The Pearl Sessions 2012 edition
- Barry Feinstein, Tom Wilkes – photography and design for Camouflage Productions

== Charts ==
=== Weekly charts ===
Weekly chart performance for Pearl
Chart (1971–2024)	Peak position
Australian Albums (Kent Music Report)	1
Canada Top Albums/CDs (RPM)	1
Croatian International Albums (HDU)	39
Dutch Albums (Album Top 100)	1
German Albums (Offizielle Top 100)	3
Italian Albums (FIMI)	83
Norwegian Albums (VG-lista)	1
Portuguese Albums (AFP)	24
UK Albums (Official Charts)	20
US Billboard 200	1

=== Year-end charts ===
Year-end chart performance for Pearl
Chart (1971)	Position
Dutch Albums (Album Top 100)	7
German Albums (Offizielle Top 100)	7
US Billboard 200	4

== Certifications ==
Region	Certification	Certified units/sales
Canada (Music Canada)	4× Platinum	400,000^{^}
Japan (RIAJ) 1990 release	Gold	100,000^{^}
United Kingdom (BPI)	Silver	60,000^{‡}
United States (RIAA)	4× Platinum	4,000,000^{^}
^{^} Shipments figures based on certification alone.^{‡} Sales+streaming figures based on certification alone.
