= Kozmic Blues =

Single by Janis Joplin

from the album I Got Dem Ol' Kozmic Blues Again Mama!
- Released: 1969
- Recorded: June 25, 1969
- Genre: Blues rock; psychedelic rock
- Length: 4:24 (album version)
- Label: Columbia
- Songwriters: Janis Joplin; Gabriel Mekler
- Producer: Gabriel Mekler

"Kozmic Blues" is a song from American singer-songwriter Janis Joplin's I Got Dem Ol' Kozmic Blues Again Mama! album, her first after departing Big Brother and the Holding Company. It was a part of Joplin's set at the Woodstock Festival in 1969.

== Background ==
Although the concert as a whole is not regarded as Joplin at her best, that specific performance became very popular and was released on The Essential Janis Joplin.

== Chart performance ==
Chart (1969–70)	Peak position
US Billboard Hot 100	41
