= Down on Me (traditional song) =

Traditional freedom song

Single by Janis Joplin with Big Brother and the Holding Company

from the album Big Brother & the Holding Company
- B-side: "Call on Me"
- Released: 1967
- Recorded: 1967
- Genre: Psychedelic rock
- Length: 2:08
- Label: Mainstream
- Songwriters: traditional, arr. Joplin
- Producer: Bob Shad

Janis Joplin with Big Brother and the Holding Company singles chronology
"Bye, Bye Baby" (1967)	"Down on Me" (1967)	"Blindman" (1967)

"Down on Me" is a traditional freedom song from the 1920s or earlier that became popular following its 1967 remake by Janis Joplin and Big Brother and the Holding Company. The first known recording was made by Deacon Leon Davis.

== Original version ==
Several early recordings and field recordings exist:

- Deacon Leon Davis, (1927) featured on Preachers and Congregations Vol. 2: 1926-1941 - The Complete Recorded Works of Rev. W.M. Chambers, Rev. Frank Cotton, Deacon Leon Davis (Document Records DOCD-5530)
- Eddie Head and His Family, (1930) on American Primitive Vol 1: Raw Pre-war Gospel (Revenant 206)
- Mary Pinckney and Janie Hunter, on Been in the Storm So Long: A Collection of Spirituals, Folk Tales and Children's Games from Johns Island, SC (Smithsonian Folkways 40031)
- Dock Reed, Livingston, Alabama in 1940, on Negro Religious Songs and Services (Rounder CD 1514)
- The Golden Harps, on compilation Soul of Chicago
- Edna G. Cooke

The lyrics of the freedom song are darker than the later Joplin lyrics. For example, the second stanza of jazz versions and Dock Reed's version run:

2. Mary and Martha, Luke and John, All God's prophets dead and gone. Looks like everybody in this world round down on me.

== Janis Joplin version ==
Janis Joplin rearranged the song and created new lyrics. The song was originally released in the summer of 1967 and was featured on the band's debut album, Big Brother & the Holding Company. The song reached #42 on the charts, barely missing the Top 40. A live, more aggressive version is featured on the posthumously released live album In Concert and the 1973 collection Janis Joplin's Greatest Hits. This version was also released as a single, reaching #91 on the charts in 1972.

The third and final stanza of Joplin's version ends with a positive message:

3. Believe in your brother, have faith in man, / Help each other, honey, if you can / Because it looks like everybody in this whole round world / Is down on me.

Joplin's version was covered by La Lupe in 1969 and Jeany Reynolds in 1970.
