= Mercedes Benz (song) =

Single by Janis Joplin

from the album Pearl
- A-side: "Cry Baby"
- Released: 1971
- Recorded: 1970
- Genre: A cappella
- Length: 1:45
- Label: Columbia
- Songwriters: Janis Joplin; Michael McClure; Bob Neuwirth
- Producer: Paul A. Rothchild

Janis Joplin singles chronology
"Cry Baby" (1971)	"Mercedes Benz" (1971)	"Get It While You Can" (1971)

"Mercedes Benz" is an a cappella song written by the American singer Janis Joplin with Bob Neuwirth and the poet Michael McClure. The song was originally recorded by Joplin.

The song has a strong anti-consumerism message, which was a popular theme in the 1960s counterculture. It opens with Joplin sarcastically announcing "a song of great social and political import", and then satirically depicts an earnest prayer for, amongst other things, luxury material goods.

When the song was later used in an actual Mercedes-Benz commercial, author of the original poem, McClure, said he refused to watch it and would never drive one.

== History ==
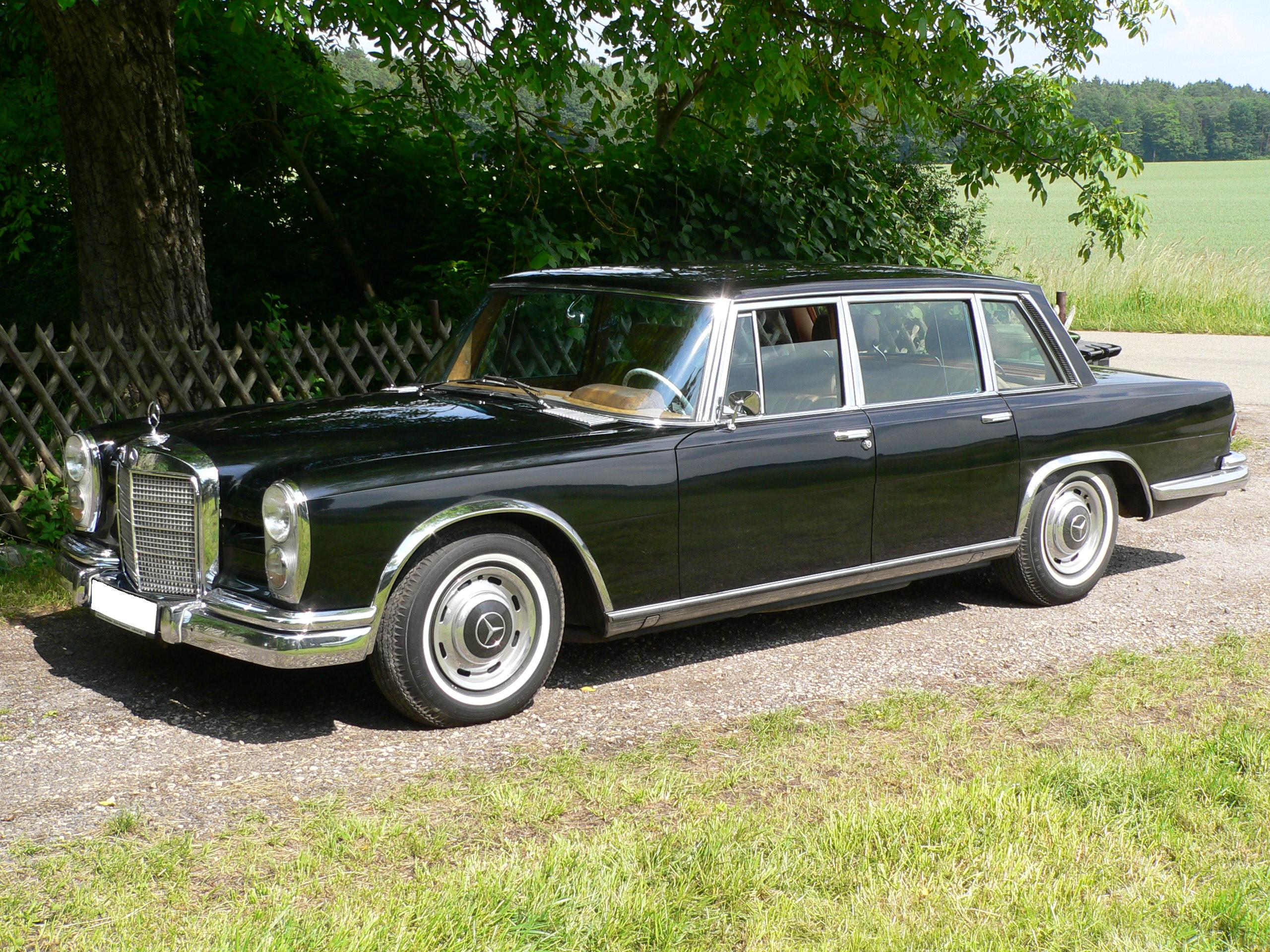
The Mercedes-Benz 600 is allegedly one of the inspirations for the song.

The song's lyrics were written down at Vahsen's, a bar in Port Chester, New York, on August 8, 1970, during an impromptu poetry jam between Joplin and songwriter Bob Neuwirth. The lyrics are from a poem written by the San Francisco beat poet Michael McClure, "Mercedes Benz". Joplin heard it sung by friends of McClure's, Rip Torn and Emmett Grogan and she began to sing it too.

In her memoir Just Kids, Patti Smith talked about the famous trip to Vahsen's and revealed that the esteemed group were also joined on the drinking session by Torn's wife Geraldine Page. Smith recalled that Joplin started reciting, “Oh, Lord won’t you buy me a Mercedes Benz” – the first line of McClure’s poem. The four others then started banging beer mugs on the table to form a rhythm, and Neuwirth wrote down the lyrics on a napkin, which he kept for years afterwards. She sang the new version for the first time that night at her concert at Capitol Theatre in Port Chester. Conversely, Bobby Womack suggests in his autobiography that Joplin was inspired to come up with the song while going for a ride with him in his new Mercedes-Benz 600.

In the song, Joplin asks God to prove his love for her by buying her a Mercedes-Benz automobile, a color TV (then a luxury item), and a "night on the town." There is also a reference to Dialing for Dollars, a franchised format local television program, which required a person to be watching the show to win a prize when the show called the person’s phone number, hence the singer's need for a TV.

The song was recorded in one take during a recording session on October 1, 1970. These were the last tracks Joplin ever recorded as she died three days later, on October 4. The song appeared on the album Pearl, released in 1971.

In 2003, Joplin's recording of the song was remixed, adding a beat and a background melody. The remixed version was included on the CD collection The Essential Janis Joplin.

== Certifications ==
Region	Certification	Certified units/sales
United States (RIAA)	Gold	500,000^{‡}
^{‡} Sales+streaming figures based on certification alone.
