= Me and Bobby McGee =

Song by Kris Kristofferson and Fred Foster

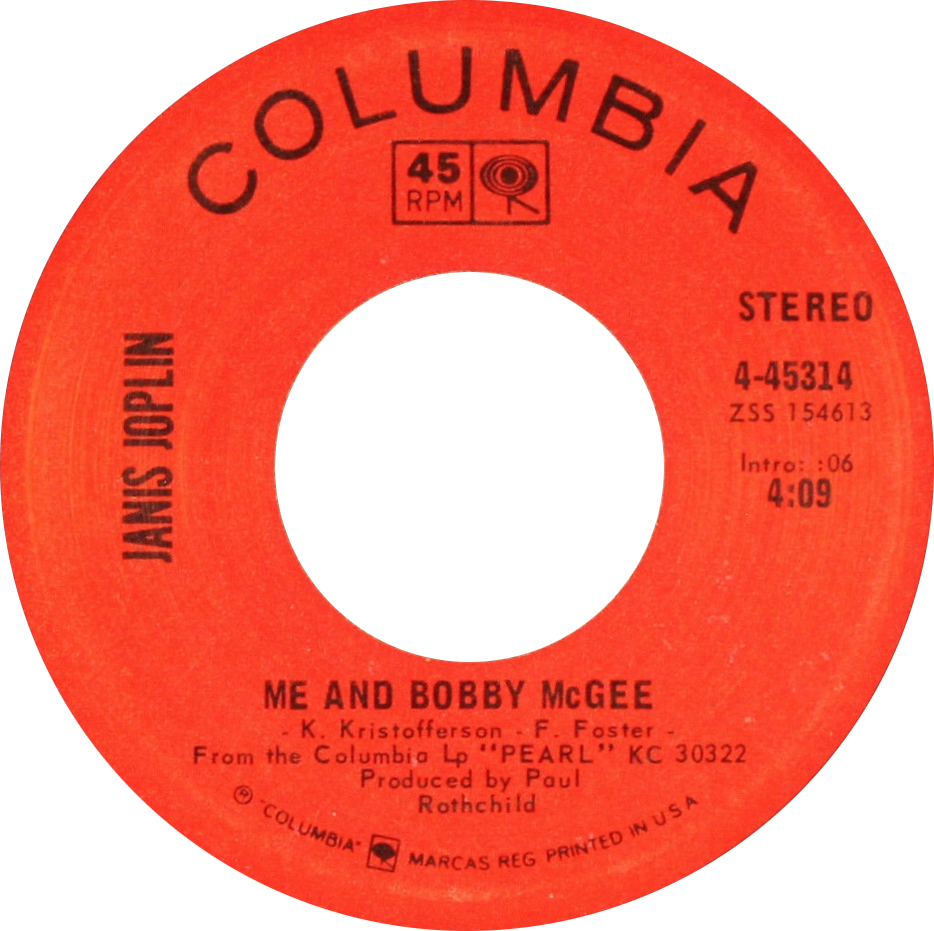
- Side A of the US single

Single by Janis Joplin

from the album Pearl
- B-side: "Half Moon"
- Released: January 12, 1971
- Recorded: September 5 – October 1, 1970
- Genre: Blues rock; country rock
- Length: 4:09 (single version); 4:28 (album version)
- Label: Columbia
- Songwriters: Kris Kristofferson; Fred Foster
- Producer: Paul A. Rothchild

Music video
- "Me and Bobby McGee" on YouTube

"Me and Bobby McGee" is a song written by American singer-songwriter Kris Kristofferson and originally performed by Roger Miller. Fred Foster shares the writing credit, as Kristofferson wrote the song based on a suggestion from Foster. A posthumously released version by Janis Joplin topped the Billboard Hot 100 in 1971, making the song the second posthumously released No. 1 single in U.S. chart history after "(Sittin' On) The Dock of the Bay" by Otis Redding. Gordon Lightfoot had previously released a version that reached number 1 on the Canadian country charts in 1970. Jerry Lee Lewis released a version that was number 1 on the country charts in December 1971/January 1972 as the "B" side of "Would You Take Another Chance on Me". Billboard ranked Joplin's version as the No. 11 song for 1971.

In 2002, the 1971 version of the song by Janis Joplin on Columbia Records was inducted into the Grammy Hall of Fame.

== History ==
The suggestion for the title was a cordial challenge from producer and Monument Records founder Fred Foster to Kris Kristofferson. The titular character was named for a studio secretary, Barbara "Bobbie" McKee, but Kristofferson had misheard her surname. He explained that he was trying to convey the despair of the last scene of Federico Fellini's La Strada in which a broken, war-torn, inebriated man (played by Anthony Quinn) stares up from the beach at the night's stars, and breaks down sobbing.

== Narrative ==
The song is the story of two drifters, the narrator and Bobby McGee. The pair hitch a ride from a truck driver and sing as they drive through the American South before making their way westward. They visit California and then part ways somewhere near Salinas, with the song's narrator expressing sadness afterwards.

Due to the singer's name never being mentioned and the name "Bobby" being gender-neutral (especially in the US), the song has been recorded by both male and female singers as a heterosexual love song with only minor differences in the lyrical content.

== Recordings and notable performances ==
Roger Miller was the first artist to record the song (in May 1969), and it appeared at No. 12 on the U.S. country chart in 1969. Kenny Rogers and the First Edition recorded the song in May/June 1969, and released it on their album Ruby, Don't Take Your Love To Town in 1969. On the Canadian charts, Gordon Lightfoot's version (recorded in November 1969) hit No. 13 on the pop music chart and No. 1 on the country music chart in 1970. The song was included on the 1970 Statler Brothers' album Bed of Rose's, but was not released as a single.

Kristofferson recorded his own version of the song on his debut album Kristofferson in 1970. Later that year, his version of the song appeared in Monte Hellman's psychedelic road movie Two-Lane Blacktop. Kristofferson also appears briefly singing the song in the 1971 Dennis Hopper film The Last Movie.

Janis Joplin recorded the song for inclusion on her posthumous album Pearl, nine days before her death in October 1970. Singer Bob Neuwirth taught it to her while Kristofferson was in Peru filming The Last Movie with Dennis Hopper. Kristofferson did not know she had recorded the song until after her death. The first time he heard her recording of it was the day after she died. Record World called it a "perfect matching of performer and material". Joplin's version topped the charts to become her only number one single; her version was later ranked No. 148 on Rolling Stone's 2004 list of The 500 Greatest Songs of All Time.

Pink performed a cover of the song on January 30, 2025 at Kia Forum in Inglewood, California for FireAid to help with relief efforts for the January 2025 Southern California wildfires.

The Grateful Dead included this song in many of their live performances, with Bob Weir on the vocals.

== Chart performance ==
=== Roger Miller version ===
Chart (1969)	Peak position
U.S. Billboard Hot Country Singles	12
U.S. Billboard Bubbling Under Hot 100	22
Canadian RPM Country Tracks	3

=== Gordon Lightfoot version ===
Chart (1970)	Peak position
Canada RPM Country Tracks	1
Canada RPM Top Singles	13
South Africa (Springbok)	7

=== Janis Joplin version ===
Chart (1971)	Peak position
Australia KMR	1
Canada RPM	6
New Zealand	10
U.S. Billboard Hot 100	1
U.S. Cash Box Top 100	3

=== Charley Pride version ===
Chart (1971)	Peak position
Australia KMR	36

=== Jerry Lee Lewis version ===
Chart (1971–72)	Peak position
Canada RPM Top Singles	50
U.S. Billboard Hot 100	40
U.S. Billboard Easy Listening	39
U.S. Cash Box Top 100	63
U.S. Billboard Country	1

==== Year-end charts ====
Chart (1971)	Rank
Australia	17
Canada	79
U.S. Billboard Hot 100	11
U.S. Cash Box	29

== Certifications ==
=== Janis Joplin's version ===
Region	Certification	Certified units/sales
United States (RIAA)	Platinum	1,000,000^{‡}
^{‡} Sales+streaming figures based on certification alone.
