= 18 Essential Songs =

Compilation album by Janis Joplin
- Released: January 24, 1995
- Recorded: 1963–1970
- Genre: Rock
- Length: 69:39
- Label: Columbia
- Producer: Bob Irwin (compilation)

Janis Joplin chronology
This is Janis Joplin (1995)	18 Essential Songs (1995)	Live at Winterland '68 (1998)

18 Essential Songs is a collection of songs recorded throughout Janis Joplin's career released in 1995 by Columbia Records. It included songs from her solo career as well as with Big Brother & the Holding Company. The Recording Industry Association of America (RIAA) certified it as gold on April 12, 1999.

== Reception ==
Professional ratings
Review scores
Source	Rating
AllMusic	4.5/5 stars

AllMusic critic William Ruhlmann awarded the album 4.5 out of five stars and noted:

18 Essential Songs is a one-disc distillation of the triple-disc Janis box set. Running 70 minutes, it is a more extensive best-of than the ten-track 1973 Janis Joplin's Greatest Hits album. But it is denied "first pick" status because, unlike that album, it does not contain the hit version of Joplin's only number one single, "Me and Bobby McGee." (It does, however, contain an alternate demo version of that song.)

== Track listing ==
No.	Title	Writer(s)	Original album	Length
1.	"Trouble in Mind"	Richard M. Jones	demo (1963)	2:54
2.	"Down on Me"	traditional, arr. Janis Joplin	Big Brother & the Holding Company	2:05
3.	"Bye Bye Baby"	Powell Saint John	Big Brother & the Holding Company	2:38
4.	"Ball and Chain"	Big Mama Thornton	recorded live 6/17/67 at Monterey Pop Festival	8:13
5.	"Piece of My Heart"	Bert Berns, Jerry Ragovoy	Cheap Thrills	4:26
6.	"I Need a Man to Love"	Joplin, Sam Andrew	Cheap Thrills	4:51
7.	"Summertime"	George, Ira Gershwin, DuBose Heyward	Alternate take. Original on Cheap Thrills	4:06
8.	"Try (Just a Little Bit Harder)"	Ragovoy, Chip Taylor	I Got Dem Ol' Kozmic Blues Again Mama!	3:56
9.	"One Good Man"	Joplin	I Got Dem Ol' Kozmic Blues Again Mama!	4:09
10.	"Kozmic Blues"	Joplin, Gabriel Mekler	I Got Dem Ol' Kozmic Blues Again Mama!	4:22
11.	"Raise Your Hand"	Steve Cropper, Eddie Floyd, Alvertis Isbell	recorded live 3/16/69 on The Ed Sullivan Show	2:18
12.	"Tell Mama"	Clarence Carter, Marcus Daniel, Wilbur Terrell	Farewell Song	5:47
13.	"Move Over"	Joplin	Pearl	3:40
14.	"Mercedes Benz"	Joplin, Mike McClure, Bob Neuwirth	Pearl	1:46
15.	"Get It While You Can"	Ragovoy, Mort Shuman	Pearl	3:23
16.	"Half Moon"	Johanna Hall, John Hall	Pearl	3:52
17.	"Trust Me"	Bobby Womack	Pearl	3:15
18.	"Me and Bobby McGee"	Kris Kristofferson, Fred Foster	Alternate mono demo. Original on Pearl	3:58
Total length:				69:39

== Personnel ==
- Janis Joplin – lead vocal, acoustic guitar (on "Me and Bobby McGee"), chorus voices
- James Gurley, John Till, Jorma Kaukonen, Michael Bloomfield – guitars
- Sam Andrew – guitars, backing vocals
- Gabriel Mekler, Richard Kermode – keyboards
- Ken Pearson – organ
- Richard Bell – piano
- Cornelius "Snooky" Flowers – baritone sax, backing vocals
- Terry Clements – tenor sax
- Luis Gasca – trumpet
- Brad Campbell, Peter Albin – bass
- Clark Pierson, Dave Getz, Lonnie Castille, Maury Baker, Roy Markowitz – drums, percussion
- Sandra Crouch – tambourine
- Bobbye Hall – conga/bongos
- Full Tilt Boogie Band, Vince Mitchell, Phil Badella, John Cooke – chorus voices
- Songs produced by Jorma Kaukonen, Bob Shad, John Phillips, Lou Adler, Elliot Mazer, Gabriel Mekler, Paul A. Rothchild
- "Tell Mama" remixed by Elliot Mazer

== Sales certifications ==
Region	Certification	Certified units/sales
New Zealand (RMNZ)	Gold	7,500^{^}
United States (RIAA)	Gold	500,000^{^}
^{^} Shipments figures based on certification alone.
