= Flower in the Sun =

Single by Big Brother and the Holding Company

from the album In Concert
- Released: 1972
- Recorded: 1970
- Genre: Blues rock, hard rock, acid rock, psychedelic rock
- Length: 3:04 (album) 3:04 (single)
- Label: Columbia
- Songwriter(s): Sam Andrew

"Flower in the Sun" is a psychedelic rock song by Big Brother and the Holding Company with Janis Joplin written by founding member, guitarist Sam Andrew.

It appeared in the band's live sets in 1968, and was recorded during studio sessions that year for their critically acclaimed album, Cheap Thrills. However, although the studio outtake was eventually released as bonus material on more recent pressings, the song was not actually included on the original album. Thus, its first commercial release was a live version (recorded June 23, 1968, The Carousel Ballroom, San Francisco, CA) that appears on the posthumous In Concert album from 1972.

In 1998 another live version was released as part of the set on the CD, Big Brother And The Holding Co. Live at Winterland '68.

In 2012 a version appears on the Columbia\Legacy release Live at the Carousel Ballroom 1968, an album produced by Owsley Stanley attempting to capture the sound of Janis and Big Brother live on stage.
