= Can't Go Home Again =

Live album by Big Brother and the Holding Company
- Released: 1997
- Recorded: October 1970 – December 1971
- Studio: Lion Share, Los Angeles
- Genre: Blues rock
- Length: 57:59
- Label: Legend Records
- Producer: Dave Getz, Mike Somavilla

Big Brother and the Holding Company chronology
Cheaper Thrills (1984)	Can't Go Home Again (1997)	Live at Winterland '68 (1998)

Can't Go Home Again is an album by Big Brother and the Holding Company, released in 1997.

== Track listing ==
1. "Don't You Call Me Cryin'" (Lane Tietgen)
2. "I Know" (Barbara George)
3. "As the Years Go Passing By" (Deadric Malone)
4. "Three Times Last Week" (Dave Getz, Kathi McDonald, Sam Andrew)
5. "Heartache" (Traditional; arranged by Dave Getz, Kathi McDonald, Michael Pendergrass and Roy Schmall)
6. "Tired of It All" (Ted Ashford)
7. "I Can't Go Home Again" (Gary Wright, Kristina Uppstrom)
8. "Machine Song"
9. "Havana Ghila"
10. "Try It"
11. "Drivin' Stupid"
12. "Ghost Riders in the Sky"
13. "Ghost Riders (Reprise)"

== Personnel ==
Big Brother and the Holding Company

- Kathi McDonald - vocals
- Dave Shallock - guitars, vocals
- Peter Albin - guitars, bass
- James Gurley - bass
- Dave Getz - drums, piano

== Production ==
- Michael Zagaris - photography
