= Live at the Carousel Ballroom 1968 =

Live at the Carousel Ballroom

Live album by Big Brother and the Holding Company featuring Janis Joplin
- Released: March 12, 2012
- Recorded: June 23, 1968
- Venue: The Carousel Ballroom, San Francisco, California
- Genre: Psychedelic rock; acid rock; blues rock
- Length: 1:10:51
- Label: Columbia/Legacy
- Producer: Owsley Stanley

Big Brother and the Holding Company featuring Janis Joplin chronology
| Move Over! (2011) | Live at the Carousel Ballroom (2012) | Blow All My Blues Away (2012) |

Live at the Carousel Ballroom 1968 is a live album by Big Brother and the Holding Company featuring Janis Joplin. The album was recorded by Owsley Stanley in 1968, and released on 12 March 2012 through Columbia and Legacy, on the one-year anniversary of his death in an automobile accident. He had been supervising the development and release of this album right up to the time of his death on March 12, 2011. The album is dedicated to him, and set to the specifications Stanley set prior to his death.

== Background ==
The concert by Big Brother and the Holding Company was performed at the Carousel Ballroom on June 23, 1968, shortly after recording sessions ended for the group's number-one hit album, Cheap Thrills. The concert took place during a brief six-month period in which the facilities were owned by bands including the Holding Company, Jefferson Airplane, and the Grateful Dead. Afterwards, the ballroom would be purchased and run by Bill Graham, who renamed it the Fillmore West. Owsley Stanley, who most memorably produced innovative sound recordings for the Grateful Dead, manned the sound system for the Holding Company and other acts who played the Carousel. This is the first of Stanley's Bear's Sonic Journals, hundreds of released and unreleased live shows from the San Francisco psychedelic rock era. No mixing or remastering was done for the release of the album, as Stanley's intent was to create a unique and real sound.

=== Recording ===
Limited by the technology of 1968, Stanley admirably worked to perfect the sound produced by Big Brother during the performance. Unusual by today's standards, drums and vocals are transmitted on the left channel and lead guitar and bass on the right. The distinctive results are a raw sound depicting each instrument as a different individual entity. Stage monitors had yet to be developed, so the musicians had to listen to the echo effect in the ballroom, the P.A., and amplifier sound to cue pitch. An occasional missed note, especially in the vocal harmonies, was the result. Still, the miscues don't hinder the production of an overall classic performance by the Holding Company. Despite its imperfections, this style of recording features a distinct uncut sound that captures the true live experience of the performance. Stanley also insisted that no applause be dubbed into the recording.

=== Performance ===
As for the Holding Company's performance, Janis Joplin's lead vocals are dominant. Sam Andrew also ventured beyond his lead guitar role as an occasional co-lead vocalist and backing vocalist. The Holding Company's heavily psychedelic instrumentals jell superbly with Joplin's commanding vocals, making standouts like "I Need a Man to Love" and "Ball and Chain" all the more stellar. Joplin establishes an emotional integrity in her performance. This concert is a prime example of the Holding Company at the climax of their live appearances in San Francisco. Apart from the band's usual repertoire are two rarities, "Jam - I'm Mad" and "It's A Deal," that had not yet been released. There is minimal stage banter, but what little there is noteworthy. After the eighth track, "Call on Me," it is announced to Hells Angels bikers Tiny and Tim that their motorcycles would be towed if they were not promptly moved out of the parking lot.

== Release and reception ==
Live at the Carousel 1968 was released on March 12, 2012 to compact disc on the Columbia/Legacy label. Subsequent releases were included on vinyl and, another LP release included a bonus track, "Call On Me". This version of the song was performed from the Holding Company's concert in the same venue on June 22, 1968.

San Francisco rock analyst Joel Selvin noted the live album as an influential piece in the overall "social/musical laboratory experiment akin to inmates running asylums, whose six-month run may well have corresponded with the height of the whole sixties Haight-Ashbury/San Francisco thing...". He goes on to state the recording is a pivotal part in Stanley's long and innovative sound engineering career.

In the liner notes, Stanley advises listeners on how to listen for the best experience: increase the volume and place one speaker on each side of yourself. Stanley also states that "I believe that this will be hailed as a definitive Big Brother live album...". Liner note writer Jaan Uhelszki explains, "These 14 songs are a testament to what a force of nature Janis Joplin and the Big Brother and the Holding Company was during these two nights at the Carousel Ballroom". Stanley's widow also expressed how the album preserved the production values Stanley held so dear: "This is Bear's vision -- how he heard the band live, and how he wanted to transmit it to you...".

== Track listing ==
1. "Combination of the Two" (Sam Andrew) - 4:35
2. "I Need a Man to Love" (Janis Joplin, Sam Andrew) - 6:39
3. "Flower in the Sun" (Sam Andrew) - 3:11
4. "Light is Faster Than Sound" (Peter Albin) - 6:02
5. "Summertime" (George Gershwin, DuBose Heyward) - 4:35
6. "Catch Me Daddy" (David Getz, James Gurley, Janis Joplin, Peter Albin, Sam Andrew) - 5:07
7. "It's a Deal" (David Getz, James Gurley, Janis Joplin, Peter Albin, Sam Andrew) - 2:28
8. "Call on Me" (Sam Andrew) - 4:04
9. "Jam - I'm Mad (Mad Man Blues)" (David Getz, James Gurley, Janis Joplin, Peter Albin, Sam Andrew) - 6:51
10. "Piece of My Heart" (Bert Berns, Jerry Ragovoy) - 4:49
11. "Coo Coo" (Peter Albin) - 6:22
12. "Ball & Chain" (Willie Mae Thornton) - 9:22
13. "Down on Me" (arranged by Janis Joplin) - 2:44
14. "Call on Me" (Saturday Show - June 22, 1968) (Sam Andrew) Bonus Track - 3:56

== Personnel ==
Big Brother and the Holding Company

- Janis Joplin - lead vocals
- Sam Andrew - lead guitar, backing vocals
- Peter Albin - bass guitar, backing vocals
- Dave Getz - drums, backing vocals
- James Gurley - guitar, backing vocals

== Production ==
- Owsley Stanley - Producer, mastering supervisor, sound engineer, liner notes
- Starfinder Stanley - Editorial supervisor, liner notes, photography
- Rhoney Stanley - Liner notes, memorabilia
- Paul Stubblebine - Mastering
- Marisa Magliola - Project director
- Phil Yamill - Art director, designer
- Stanley Mouse - Cover art designer, lettering design
- Jaan Uhelszki - Liner notes
