= Be a Brother =

Studio album by Big Brother and the Holding Company
- Released: October 1970
- Recorded: 1970
- Genre: Psychedelic rock
- Length: 35:09
- Label: Columbia
- Producer: Nick Gravenites

Big Brother and the Holding Company chronology
Cheap Thrills (1968)	Be a Brother (1970)	How Hard It Is (1971)

Be a Brother is the third album by Big Brother and the Holding Company, released in October 1970. It was their first album after Janis Joplin's departure. Recruited in her place were guitarist David Shallock and singer-songwriters Nick Gravenites and Kathi McDonald.

The album includes ten original Big Brother and the Holding Company compositions. Although "Home on the Strange" is credited as having been arranged and adapted by Peter Albin and Sam Andrew, it is in fact an original composition with no apparent derivation from any previous work. Although not in the band anymore Janis Joplin made a guest appearance on backup vocals for the uptempo song with fuzz guitar leads, "Mr. Natural."

== Background, composition, artwork ==
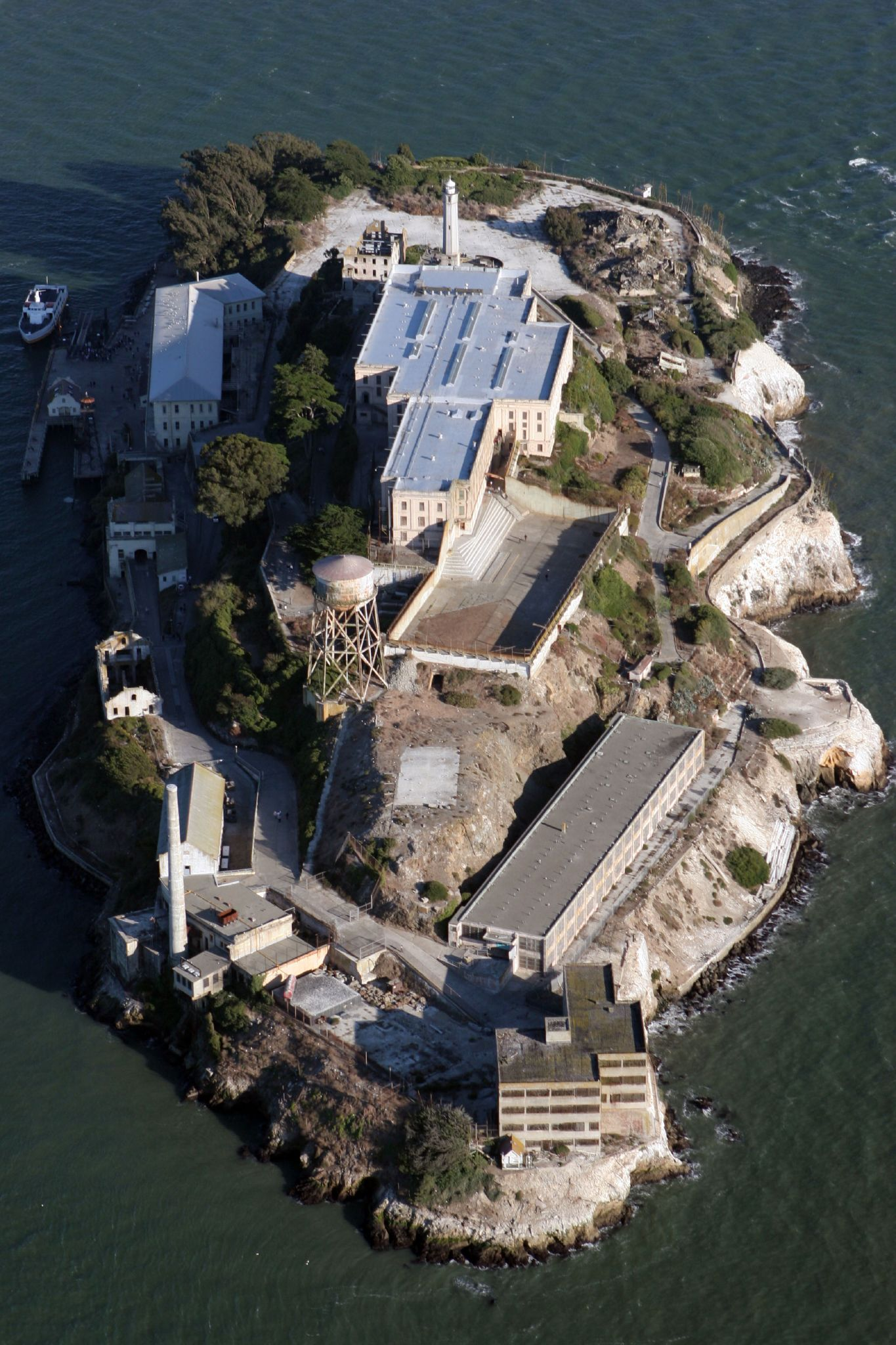
The Alcatraz Federal Penitentiary island prison located in the same city of San Francisco where Big Brother and the Holding Company was located when writing a concept album with characters residing in different parts of a prison.

Be a Brother was originally planned to be a concept album based on characters within a prison of the hippie, San Francisco based, rock band sub-culture called Weird Bummer. Graphic designer Bob Seidemann specifically created a themed cover for it which he described as "a weird, fucked up looking stick figure giving a peace sign," representing Gravenites metaphorical explanation of the characters in the hippie prison with some of the "people using junk", some on "on death row" with "the rest of them on Tier C." The concept was lost when Columbia Records rejected the idea and made them change the album title and obscure its theme.

Creating "the original psychedelic spirit and energy" featuring the guitarists "heavy fuzztone and uncontrollable amplifier feedback" sounds included the use of the Gibson SG guitars used by both Sam Andrew and James Gurley with Andrew also using at times the Gibson Les Paul Junior. Dave Schallock was documented using a Gibson semi-acoustic guitar with an example being from the bands performance at the 1970 Berkeley Folk Music Festival.

== Touring ==
In review of a live performance from the tour supporting the album in 1971 the band started the set with songs sung by vocalist and guitarist Sam Andrew and vocalist Kathi McDonald concluding with the instrumental track "Home on the Strange" featuring the bands three guitar lineup consisting of a combination of "solo and rhythm chores ... played together, in harmony and separately." This track served as a segue to the songs from the album featuring lead singer Gravenites. "No More Heartache," "Joseph's Coat," and the set closer, "Be a Brother," which allowed the singer to display his full vocal range with the reviewer noting him as "a very underrated blues artist."

== Reception ==
Professional ratings
Review scores
Source	Rating
Allmusic	2.5/5 stars
Christgau's Record Guide	A−
The Village Voice	A

Music critic Robert Christgau noted the lyrical theme of Gravenites dealing with the hippie culture as a warning against the people mentioned in "Heartache People" and "Funkie Jim" and concluding with the traditional positive hippie message in the final track "Be a Brother." Louder classified the songs as having a "loose, jam-band feel" with the track "Sunshine Baby" featuring a "stripped-down blues" sound. The book All Music Guide to the Blues brought out the "Chicago blues edge courtesy of Gravenites" and although the band was different than previous lineups the "additions of guitarist David Schallock and singer/songwriter/producer Gravenites" making the band a sextet still retained the band's "psychedelic sound". Christgau later mentioned that "Big Brother continued to grow as band into the seventies" with the progress recorded on Be a Brother as an example of the "spunky, good nature of the Mainstream album".

== Track listing ==
Side one
No.	Title	Writer(s)	Length
1.	"Keep On"	Sam Andrew, Peter Albin, David Getz, James Gurley, David Schallock	4:21
2.	"Joseph's Coat"	Nick Gravenites, John Cipollina	3:10
3.	"Home on the Strange"	Albin, Andrew	2:15
4.	"Someday"	Andrew	2:17
5.	"Heartache People"	Gravenites	6:36

Side two
No.	Title	Writer(s)	Length
6.	"Sunshine Baby"	Andrew, Albin, Getz, Gurley, Shallock	3:30
7.	"Mr. Natural"	Andrew	3:31
8.	"Funkie Jim"	Andrew, Albin, Getz, Gurley, Shallock, Gravenites	3:47
9.	"I'll Change Your Flat Tire, Merle"	Gravenites	3:14
10.	"Be a Brother"	Gravenites	3:04

== Personnel ==
Big Brother and the Holding Company

- Nick Gravenites – lead (2, 5, 8–10) and backing vocals
- Sam Andrew – guitar, lead (1, 4, 6, 7) and backing vocals
- David Schallock – guitar, backing vocals
- Peter Albin – guitar
- James Gurley – bass, guitar
- David Getz – drums, piano

with:

- Kathi McDonald – Vocals
- Richard Greene – violin
- Mike Finnigan – keyboard
- Tower of Power – horn section
- Ira Kamin
- Mark Naftalin

Technical

- David Brown, Jerry Hochman, Sy Mitchell – engineer
- Bob Seidemann – album design, photography
- John Van Hamersveld – design concept

== Charts ==
Chart (1970)	Peak position
US Billboard 200	134
