= How Hard It Is =

Studio album by Big Brother and the Holding Company
- Released: August 1971
- Studio: CBS Studios, San Francisco, California
- Genre: Rock
- Length: 37:23
- Label: Columbia
- Producer: Roscoe Segel, Roy Segal

Big Brother and the Holding Company chronology
Be a Brother (1970)	How Hard It Is (1971)	Cheaper Thrills (1984)

Professional ratings
Review scores
Source	Rating
Allmusic	2.5/5 stars
Christgau's Record Guide	C

How Hard It Is is the fourth and final studio album by Big Brother and the Holding Company, released in August 1971. The track "Buried Alive in the Blues" was originally written by guest singer Nick Gravenites for Janis Joplin, who died before she could record her vocal. It was included as an instrumental by the Full Tilt Boogie Band on her final album Pearl, released the previous year.

== Chart performance ==
The album peaked at No. 157 on the Billboard Top LPs, during a three-week run on the chart.

== Track listing ==
1. "How Hard It Is" (David Getz, Sam Andrew) – 4:21
2. "You've Been Talkin' 'Bout Me, Baby" (Ray Rivera, Gale Garnett, Walter Hirsch) – 3:27
3. "House on Fire" (Getz, Louis Rappaport) – 3:56
4. "Black Widow Spider" (Andrew) – 3:32
5. "Last Band on Side One" (Roscoe Segel, Andrew) – 1:57
6. "Nu Boogaloo Jam" (Dan Nudelman, Andrew) – 3:24
7. "Maui" (Segel, Andrew) – 3:27
8. "Shine On" (Getz, Peter Albin, Andrew) – 5:25
9. "Buried Alive in the Blues" (Nick Gravenites) – 3:59
10. "Promise Her Anything but Give Her Arpeggio" (David Schallock) – 3:55

== Personnel ==
Big Brother and the Holding Company

- Sam Andrew - guitar, vocals
- James Gurley - bass
- Peter Albin - guitar, bass, mandolin, vibraslap
- David Getz - drums, percussion, marimba, piano

Additional Personnel

- Kathi McDonald - lead vocals on "Black Widow Spider", backing vocals
- Mike Finnigan - vocals, piano and organ on "How Hard It Is", "You've Been Talkin' 'Bout Me, Baby", "House on Fire", "Shine On" and "Buried Alive in the Blues"
- Nick Gravenites - lead vocals on "Buried Alive in the Blues"
- David Schallock - lead guitar on "How Hard It Is", "House on Fire", "Black Widow Spider", "Nu Boogaloo Jam", "Promise Her Anything But Give Her Arpeggio"

Technical

- David Brown, George Engfer, George Horn, Mike Larner - recording
- Dennis Nolan - artwork

== Charts ==
Chart (1971)	Peak position
US Billboard Top LPs	157
