= Love, Janis (musical) =

- Music: Janis Joplin
- Lyrics: Janis Joplin
- Book: Randal Myler
- Basis: The life of Janis Joplin
- Productions: 1994 Denver Center; Cleveland Playhouse; Actors Theatre of Louisville; Chicago's Royal George Theatre; Cincinnati Playhouse; 1997 Zach Scott Theatre; 2000 Bay Street Theatre; 2001 Off-Broadway; 2001 San Diego Repertory Theatre; 2006 San Francisco Marines Memorial Theatre; 2007 Kansas City Repertory Theatre; 2008 Alley Theatre, Houston

Love, Janis is a musical stage show about the life and music of rock and roll singer Janis Joplin. It was conceived, adapted and directed by Randal Myler (Hank Williams: Lost Highway, It Ain't Nothin' But The Blues). It debuted Off-Broadway in 2001 at the Village Theater (formerly the famed Village Gate) with musical direction by former Big Brother And The Holding Company band member Sam Andrew. The show had a long and healthy run, garnering over 700 performances.

== Productions ==
Love, Janis was initially produced by the Denver Center Theater Company in May 1994, written and directed by Randal Myler. Onstage Janis was played by Laura Theodore and private Janis was played by Catherine Curtin (Stranger Things, Orange Is The New Black).

Love, Janis was produced at the Zachary Scott Theatre Center, Austin, Texas, running August 1997–October 1997. Directed by Randal Myler, Andra Mitrovich played Janis as the soulful singer and Catherine Curtin portrayed the private woman. The musical also played at the Bay Street Theatre in Sag Harbor, New York in 2000, as well as the Cleveland Play House (in 1999) and the Royal George Theatre in Chicago (in 1999, Catherine Curtin receiving a Jeff Award nomination for Best Actress).

Love, Janis opened Off-Broadway at the Village Theatre, New York City, opening on April 10, 2001 and closed on January 5, 2003 after over 700 performances. Directed by Randal Myler, Catherine Curtin starred as Janis, with alternating performances by Cathy Richardson and Andra Mitrovich (later singers included Beth Hart, Laura Branigan, Orfeh, and Sass Jordan). Production design was by Jules Fisher and Peggy Eisenhauer; costumes were by Robert Blackman ("Star Trek").

=== Regional productions ===
There were many regional productions that ran after the Off-Broadway production. The musical premiered on the West Coast at the San Diego Repertory Theatre in September 2001 (directed by Randal Myler). A production played at the Marines Memorial Theater in San Francisco, California in July 2006, directed by Myler and with musical direction by former Big Brother And The Holding Company band member Sam Andrew. The San Francisco production included lighting by Bill Ham, the man behind the psychedelic light shows at the Avalon Ballroom and other venues in San Francisco in the 1960s. A production ran at the Kansas City Repertory Theatre (Kansas City) in 2007, directed by Myler which featured Kacee Clanton and Mary Bridget Davies alternating as the singing Janis. The musical ran at the Alley Theatre in Houston, Texas starting in January 2008, directed by Myler and starring Katrina Chester.

== Concept ==
The musical was inspired by the best-selling book of the same name by sister Laura Joplin. Myler constructed the musical around the letters that Laura Joplin had given him. The musical begins in 1966, after Joplin has hitchhiked to San Francisco to join Big Brother and the Holding Company, and ends with her death in 1970. Her journey is told in her own words; the entire spoken text is quoted from Joplin's letters and interviews.

Performances include many of Joplin's most famous songs, "Piece of My Heart", "Get It While You Can", "Me and Bobby McGee", "Ball and Chain" and "Mercedes Benz". Music direction for the Off-Broadway production was provided by Sam Andrew, founding member of Big Brother and the Holding Company. A soundtrack album, using the original music and with letters read by Catherine Curtin, has also been released.
