= List of Canadian number-one albums of 1968 =

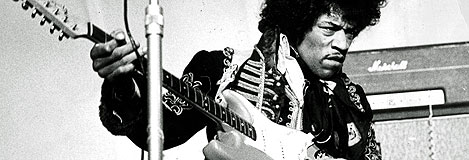
Jimi Hendrix's album Electric Ladyland spent the most weeks (3) at number-one in 1968.

The Canadian Top 50 Albums, published in RPM, was a record chart that features albums in Canada. The first chart started on October 14, 1968, and the last issue was October 30, 2000. There were seven number-one albums in 1968: the first was Wheels of Fire by Cream, and the last was The Beatles by The Beatles. Jimi Hendrix's Electric Ladyland spent the most weeks at number-one, spending three weeks from November 18 to December 2. Wheels of Fire, Cheap Thrills by Big Brother and the Holding Company, and The Beatles all spent two weeks at number-one. Steppenwolf by Steppenwolf and Wichita Lineman by Glen Campbell spent one week at number-one.

== Albums ==
Issue Date	Album	Artist	Ref.
October 14	Wheels of Fire	Cream	
October 21	Feliciano!	José Feliciano	
October 28	Cheap Thrills	Big Brother and the Holding Company	
November 4	Cheap Thrills	Big Brother and the Holding Company	
November 11	Steppenwolf	Steppenwolf	
November 18	Electric Ladyland	Jimi Hendrix	
November 25	Electric Ladyland	Jimi Hendrix	
December 2	Electric Ladyland	Jimi Hendrix	
December 9	Wichita Lineman	Glen Campbell	
December 16	The Beatles	The Beatles	
December 23	The Beatles	The Beatles	
