= Kacee Clanton =

American singer-songwriter

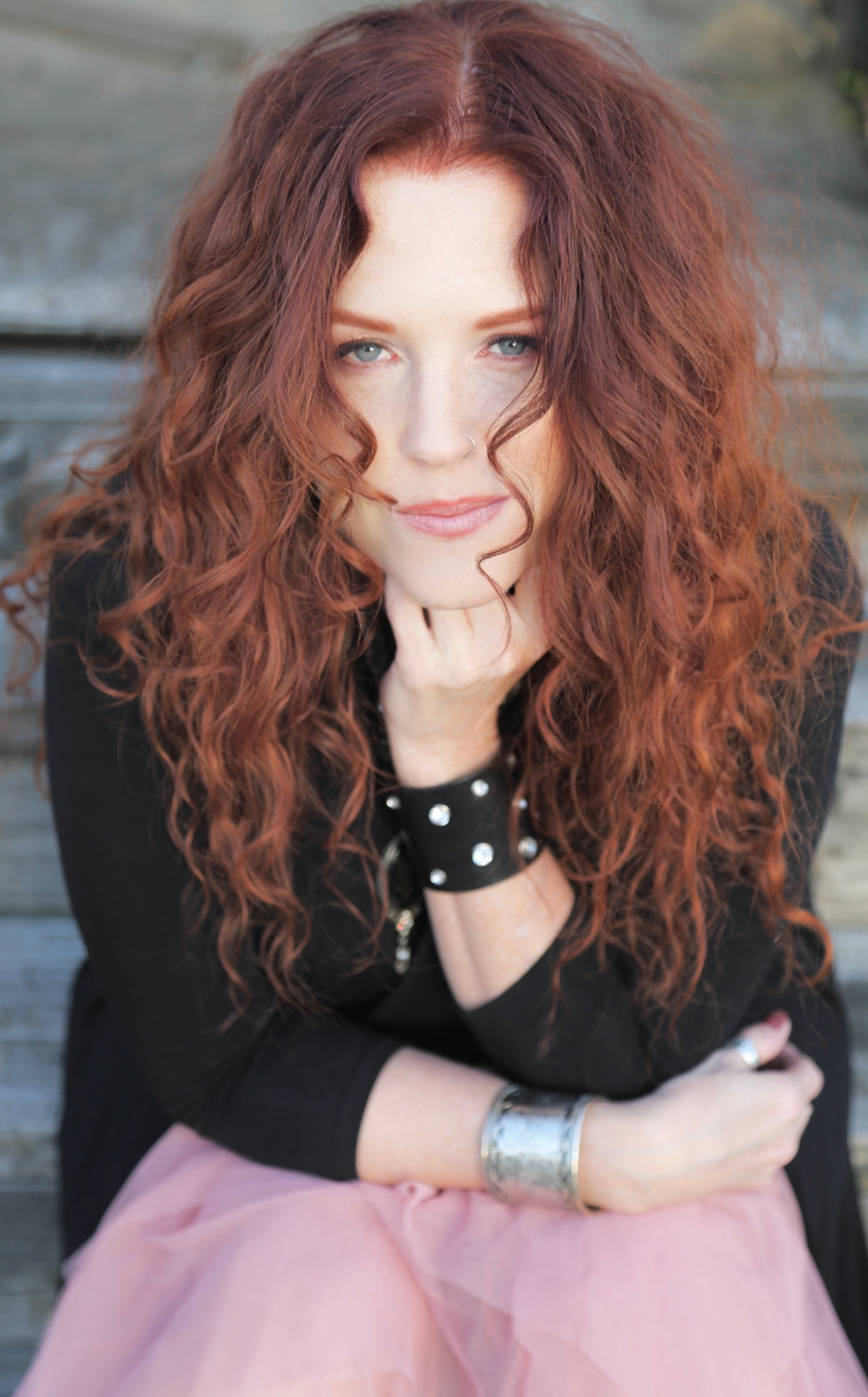
Photo by Gene Reed 2022

Kacee Clanton (born Kellie Kristine Clanton) is an American, Nashville–based singer/songwriter, recording artist, stage actress, producer, and vocal and performance coach, who has worked as a background vocalist for recording artists Joe Cocker and Luis Miguel, and toured as lead vocalist with Big Brother and the Holding Company. She has played Janis Joplin in the musical Love, Janis and was the alternate lead on Broadway in the rock musical, A Night With Janis Joplin. She was also a vocal and performance instructor at Los Angeles College of Music. Both her music and vocals have been used in a variety of films, TV shows, and video games. She currently lives in the Nashville area and works as a singer, actor, producer and vocal coach.

== Beginnings ==
She grew up in a musical home and was very involved in her church's music program. She began studying classical voice at the age of 15 and later studied at University of the Pacific's Conservatory of Music. She moved to the Los Angeles area and began performing, modeling and doing commercial vocal work in the late 1980s. After 3 decades of building a successful career in Los Angeles, she relocated to Nashville in 2021, where she is currently a recording artist, actor and session singer.

== Solo recordings ==
Clanton released her first independent solo CD entitled Seeing Red in 1996. It is a combination of traditional blues, modern rock, jazz, and gospel, and features various Los Angeles–based session players and singers such as Danny Jacob, T Lavitz, Ray Brinker, Tom Lilly, Chris Smith of Jefferson Starship, Robbie Wyckoff, and Tommy Alvarado. It also features iconic blues vocalist/guitarist Coco Montoya.

Her second release, Mama Came to Sing, was released in 2005. Mama is a blend of hard-hitting rock, funky folk, groovy blues, and moody pop. It features players and singers such as Tom Lilly, Jon Nichols, Ray Brinker, Jon Greathouse, Maureen Baker, David Crozier, Robbie Wyckoff, Janelle Sadler, and Ryan Drummond.

In 2013, she released an EP, Short on Time & Money, co-produced and co-written with Andre Berry, and is a blend of funk, rock and melodic pop.

== Theatre ==
In 2001, Clanton joined the cast of the Off-Broadway stage production Love, Janis, playing the lead role in the rock musical based on the life and music of Janis Joplin. She performed in the production at the San Diego Repertory Theatre in both 2001 and 2002, where the Los Angeles Times said, "Joplin's mannerisms and her mix of sweetness and vulgarity were captured to near perfection...by Kacee..." She joined the cast once again in 2007 at the Kansas City Repertory Theatre, where The Broadway Blog review said "Clanton literally brought the crowd to our feet with her exacting portrayal of Janis' music and fervent performance style." In 2009, she performed the show at The Downstairs Cabaret Theatre (Rochester, NY).

Clanton appeared in Repartee '07: A Theatrical Review at the Kansas City Repertory Theatre in 2007, Bandage: the Rock Opera at the House of Blues in West Hollywood, California, in 2008, and Your Town Follies, a Cirque Comique, at El Portal Theatre in No. Hollywood, California, in 2010.

In 2013, she joined the regional stage production of "One Night With Janis Joplin" at Zach Theatre and San Jose Repertory Theatre, playing the lead role as Janis Joplin, before joining the Broadway cast of the renamed production, "A Night With Janis Joplin" as the alternate lead, alongside Tony nominated Mary Bridget Davies, at the Lyceum Theatre. The production closed in February 2014.

Clanton performed for thousands and received rave reviews. "Tears rolled down my cheeks when Kacee Clanton poured her heart into 'Summertime'...Her phrasings were perfect - the soulful wail...the notes torn from a raw, visceral core - all within an artful reproduction of Joplin's unique delivery." "The formidable Kacee Clanton channels the wild-child fury of Joplin, shaking the rafters...Clanton...recreates Joplin's raspy vocals with uncanny purity. She nails Joplin's mind-boggling range, from the husky purr of 'Me and Bobby McGee' to the incandescent screech and howl of 'Ball and Chain'. The charismatic singer-actress...knows how to seduce a crowd as well as belt out a song. She's half diva, half earth mother and she summons up the iconic singer's unmistakable combination of grace and grit with breathtaking force. She connects with the music deeply and that sense of intimacy is the show's most intoxicating quality. Her lusty evocation of Joplin's whiskey-soaked wail is nothing less than unforgettable." After the Broadway show closed, Clanton joined regional casts at Pasadena Playhouse, 5th Avenue Theatre, Alley Theatre, American Conservatory Theater, where she was part of a city-wide celebration of the 50th Anniversary of Woodstock and received rave reviews: "Clanton is an uncanny medium, never aping Joplin's immortal intonations of particular phrases but so fluent in her timbre — which is to say her many timbres — as to give the show the feel of an undiscovered concert recording… Her electrifying glissando in ‘Summertime’ makes you wonder why anyone, ever, would choose to keep different musical notes separate. On raspy high notes, she seems to fray vocal cords to snapping, only to surprise you again and again when she veers to a fluttery coloratura or a sustain with the assured breath support, the perfectly calibrated vibrato of an opera singer". Clanton performed the show for the last time in 2017 at McCarter Theatre.

In 2015, Clanton was part of the premiere cast of a new pop musical, Breaking Through, at the Pasadena Playhouse. "Kacee...has a luscious powerhouse voice that instantly raises the pulse of the production every time her character, Karina, a star quickly losing her bankability, drunkenly staggers onto the stage to haunt the other singers with her sorry story.”

== Touring ==
Beth Hart

In 2003, Clanton joined Beth Hart as a background singer for a variety of concerts in support of Hart's 2003 release, Leave the Light On.

Big Brother and the Holding Company

In 2002, Clanton began touring as lead vocalist with Big Brother and the Holding Company (BBHC), Janis Joplin's original San Francisco–based band. She has performed with BBHC many times over the years, including a European tour and a variety of festivals and concert venues throughout the U.S. and Canada.

Joe Cocker

Clanton joined rock legend Joe Cocker in 2004 as a background singer in support of his Heart & Soul world tour (2005/2006) and continued in that capacity through his Hymn for My Soul world tour (2007/2008).

Luis Miguel

In 2008, Clanton joined Latin star Luis Miguel as a background singer on his Cómplices world tour (2008/2009) and then again for his Luis Miguel world tour (2010/2012)

== Los Angeles College of Music ==
She joined the teaching staff of the Los Angeles College of Music (LACM) in 2008 as a vocal and performance instructor. She was instrumental in designing both the performance and rock programs at LACM.

== Commercial work ==
She has appeared on television shows such as The Tonight Show (NBC), Live! with Regis & Kelly (ABC), and Parkinson (BBC/ITV). Her songs and/or vocals have appeared in films such as Tooth Fairy (20th Century Fox), and Kinsey (Fox Searchlight Pictures), and television programs such as Brothers & Sisters (ABC), Fox Sports, Cribs (MTV), Open House New York, 18 to Life (CBC/Canada), The Guiding Light (CBS), Star Search (CBS), and Thirtysomething (ABC). Clanton has also contributed soundtrack and/or voiceover work to video games such as The Saboteur (AE Games), Heavy Gear (Activision), and Teen Digital (Activision).
