= Live at Winterland '68 =

Live album by Big Brother and the Holding Company
- Released: June 2, 1998
- Recorded: April 12–13, 1968
- Venue: Winterland Ballroom, San Francisco, California
- Genre: Psychedelic rock
- Length: 75:46
- Label: Columbia, Legacy
- Producer: Bob Irwin

Big Brother and the Holding Company chronology
| Cheaper Thrills (1984) | Live at Winterland '68 (1998) | The Lost Tapes (2008) |

Professional ratings
Review scores
| Source | Rating |
|---|---|
| AllMusic | 3/5 stars |

Live at Winterland '68 is an album by Janis Joplin with her band Big Brother and the Holding Company. It was recorded at the Winterland Ballroom on April 12 and 13, 1968, and includes live renditions of songs from their studio albums.

After a successful tour of the East Coast of the United States, with B. B. King, Albert King, and others, Big Brother returned to San Francisco, where this album was recorded. Lengthier renditions of their songs, such as "Light Is Faster Than Sound" extending over 7 minutes, are included.

== Track listing ==
1. "Down on Me" (Janis Joplin) 3:01
2. "Flower in the Sun" (Sam Andrew) 3:12
3. "I Need a Man to Love" (Janis Joplin, Sam Andrew) 5:52
4. "Bye Bye Baby" (Powell St. John) 4:14
5. "Easy Rider" (James Gurley) 5:17
6. "Combination of the Two" (Sam Andrew) 6:58
7. "Farewell Song" (Sam Andrew) 6:08
8. "Piece of My Heart" (Jerry Ragovoy, Bert Berns) 6:41
9. "Catch Me Daddy" (Janis Joplin, Peter Albin, Sam Andrew, David Getz, James Gurley) 5:45
10. "Magic of Love" (Mark Spoelstra) 3:07
11. "Summertime" (George Gershwin, Ira Gershwin, DuBose Heyward) 4:38
12. "Light Is Faster Than Sound" (Peter Albin) 7:15
13. "Ball and Chain" (Big Mama Thornton) 9:42
14. "Down on Me" (second version) (Janis Joplin) 4:03

== Personnel ==
- Janis Joplin – vocals
- James Gurley, Sam Andrew – guitar, vocals
- Peter Albin – bass guitar, vocals
- David Getz – drums, vocals

Technical

- Vic Anesini – mixing, mastering
- Kerstin Bach – art direction
- Pat Lofthouse – original Winterland poster
- Baron Wolman – cover photography
