= 18 Songs =

Eighteen Songs or 18 Songs may refer to:

- Eighteen Songs of a Nomad Flute songs on handscroll commissioned by Emperor Gaozong of Song (1107–1187)
- 18 Essential Songs compilation by Janis Joplin
