= Cheaper Thrills =

Live album by Janis Joplin with Big Brother and the Holding Company
- Released: 1984
- Recorded: July 28, 1966
- Venues: California Hall, San Francisco, California
- Genres: Rock, psychedelic rock
- Length: 41:15
- Label: Fan Club
- Producer: David Getz

Janis Joplin with Big Brother and the Holding Company chronology
Farewell Song (1982)	Cheaper Thrills (1984)	This Is Janis Joplin 1965 (1995)

Professional ratings
Review scores
Source	Rating
Christgau's Record Guide	B+

Cheaper Thrills is a live album by Big Brother and the Holding Company with Janis Joplin as their lead singer. Recorded live at one of their earliest concerts in San Francisco at California Hall on July 28, 1966, it includes the band's rendition of the song "Let the Good Times Roll," which was ten years old at the time. The recording of this concert became officially available to the public for the first time in 1984. The LP was originally released by Rhino Records as RNLP 121. Big Brother drummer David Getz produced and contributed liner notes to the back cover with his personal reminiscences of the circumstances leading to the formation and success of the band.

The live material on this release was also released as Cheaper Thrills in 1984 on Edsel Records (UK) and Live in San Francisco 1966 in 2002 on Varese.

The CD versions' track listing are in a different order, with the Varese version adding the bonus track, "Hall of the Mountain King."

== Track listing ==
Side one
No.	Title	Writer(s)	Length
1.	"Come On Baby Let the Good Times Roll"	Leonard Lee	2:32
2.	"I Know You Rider"	Traditional; arranged by Big Brother and the Holding Company	3:08
3.	"Moanin' at Midnight"	Chester Burnett	4:55
4.	"Hey Baby"	Big Brother and the Holding Company	3:02
5.	"Down On Me"	Traditional; arranged by Big Brother and the Holding Company	2:40
6.	"Gutra's Garden"	Big Brother and the Holding Company	3:42
7.	"Harry"	David Getz	0:29

Side two
No.	Title	Writer(s)	Length
1.	"Whisperman"	Big Brother and the Holding Company	1:43
2.	"Women Is Losers"	Janis Joplin	3:39
3.	"Blow My Mind"	Jimmy McCracklin	2:30
4.	"Oh My Soul"	Richard Penniman	2:22
5.	"Coo-Coo"	Traditional; arranged by Big Brother and the Holding Company	2:18
6.	"Ball and Chain"	Big Mama Thornton	6:37

== Personnel ==
Big Brother and the Holding Company

- Janis Joplin – vocals, maracas
- James Gurley – guitar
- Sam Andrew – guitar
- Peter Albin – bass, vocals
- David Getz – drums

Technical

- Dana Joe Chappelle – engineer
- Skip Saylor – engineer
- Stanley Mouse – front cover art, calligraphy
- Herb Greene – front cover photograph
