= Kathi McDonald =

American blues and rock singer and songwriter (1948–2012)

Background information
- Also known as: Kathy McDonald
- Born: Kathryn Marie McDonald; September 25, 1948; Anacortes, Washington, U.S.
- Died: October 3, 2012 (aged 64) Seattle, Washington, U.S.
- Genres: Blues; R&B; rock
- Occupations: Singer, songwriter
- Labels: Capitol Records; Hypertension Music; Merrimack Record
- Website: http://kathimcdonald.com/

Kathryn Marie "Kathi" McDonald (September 25, 1948 – October 3, 2012) was an American blues and rock singer and songwriter. As a teenager she sang with different bands around the Pacific Northwest before she was discovered by Ike Turner. She sang as an Ikette with Ike & Tina Turner and eventually replaced Janis Joplin as the front woman of Big Brother and Holding Company. McDonald became a background vocalist for various artists, including Leon Russell, Joe Cocker, The Rolling Stones, Freddie King, and Long John Baldry. She also recorded as a solo artist and fronted her own band Kathi McDonald & Friends.

== Early life ==
McDonald was born in Anacortes, Washington, on September 25, 1948. McDonald began singing at an early age. The first song she fully learned was "Goodnight Irene" by Huddie Leadbetter and at age two she would sing all five verses from her crib. McDonald performed professionally for the first time around Seattle when she was 12 years old.

== Early career ==
From 1963 to 1968, McDonald was a vocalist in several bands that played Bellingham, Anacortes, Mount Vernon, Oak Harbor and other Pacific Northwest venues. McDonald sang with regional bands such as The Accents or Bellingham Accents (1963–1965), The Checkers (1964–1965), The Unusuals (1965–1967), and Fat Jack (1966–1968).

McDonald was 17 years old when "Babe, It's Me" peaked at #1 on Bellingham's Top 40 radio station KPUG in early April 1966. The song remained at the top of the chart for four to five weeks. The single, released on the Panorama label, was the first release by The Unusuals (formerly The Bellingham Accents) and it featured vocals by McDonald and Laurie Vitt who wrote the song and was a founding member of the band. Shortly thereafter, with McDonald as soloist, the Unusuals released their second single "Summer is Over" and, while it received airplay on local radio, it was a lesser hit in the Pacific Northwest. Kathi & The Unusuals toured with Dewey Martin (pseudonym Sir Raleigh and previously Sir Raleigh and the Cupons).

== Big Brother and the Holding Company ==
While living in Seattle, McDonald developed strong San Francisco music connections and promoter Chet Helms invited her to audition for Big Brother and the Holding Company in 1966. He also invited a then-unknown Janis Joplin from Austin, Texas. Joplin arrived in San Francisco before McDonald and was hired to front the band. McDonald held some resentment for losing the job to Joplin, who people often compared her voice to, she stated:

"I used to hate doing Janis songs...It really was annoying for a lot of years, but I finally made my peace with it. I read some books about her and I realized what a pathetic life she had, with all kinds of screwups. It was terrible. The poor thing. Anything that could have gone wrong, did go wrong. I thought it was just one big freakin' party, but it wasn't. She had a lot of heartbreak."

== Later works ==
McDonald relocated to San Francisco at the age of 19. At an Ike & Tina Turner concert at promoter Bill Graham's Carousel Ballroom (Fillmore West) in San Francisco, McDonald caught the attention of bandleader Ike Turner when she was singing along to "River Deep, Mountain High". She was pregnant at the time and he invited her to record as an Ikette in the studio. As an Ikette, she sang on their album Come Together (1970). She then recorded with Big Brother and the Holding Company after Joplin split with the band.

Around this time, McDonald became one of Leon Russell's Shelter People . She sang on Russell's album Leon Russell And The Shelter People (1971). McDonald also contributed backing vocals to four tracks that appear on The Rolling Stones album Exile on Main Street (1972), including the hit single "Tumbling Dice". During this period, she sang with various artists, including Freddie King, Joe Cocker, Rita Coolidge, and Delaney & Bonnie.

In 1973, she recorded her debut solo album, Insane Asylum, for Capitol Records. The album was co-produced by David Briggs and Pete Sears. Sears was also her musical arranger and played keyboards and bass, as well as writing several of the album's songs with McDonald. The album featured musicians such as Nils Lofgren, John Cipollina and Neal Schon on guitar, Aynsley Dunbar on drums, Boots Hughston on horns. McDonald sang a cover of Willie Dixon's "Insane Asylum" with Sly Stone. The album was released in 1974 and reached #156 on the Billboard 200. Rufus was McDonald's opening act when she performed at The Whisky in May 1974.

In 1976, McDonald met blues singer Long John Baldry and they collaborated until his death in 2005. She toured with him and they enjoyed success in Australia where their duet "You've Lost That Lovin' Feelin'" reached #2 in 1980.

Twenty years after her debut, she released her sophomore album, Save Your Breath, in 1994. McDonald reunited with Big Brother and the Holding Company in California for a concert on New Year's Eve, 1997. Her next album, Above and Beyond, was released in 1999. It featured Lee Oskar on harmonica and Brian Auger on keyboards.

In later years, McDonald contributed to the Seattle Women in Rhythm and Blues project.

McDonald eventually fronted her own band and continued to perform regionally. In February 2009, she performed at the opening gala for the San Francisco Museum of Performance & Design along with Sam Andrew, welcoming in a new exhibition dedicated to the art and music of San Francisco of the 1965–1975 era.

== Death ==
McDonald struggled with alcoholism and drug abuse. She died at the age of 64 in Seattle, Washington, on October 3, 2012. She was survived by her daughter.

== Influences ==
Her musical influences were Gail Harris and Tina Turner.

== Accolades ==
McDonald was inducted into the Washington Blues Society's Hall of Fame in 1999.

== Discography ==
=== Albums ===
- 1974: Insane Asylum (Capitol Records) – reached #156 on the Billboard 200
- 1994: Save Your Breath (Hypertension Music)
- 1999: Above & Beyond (Merrimack Records)
- 2004: Kathi McDonald
- 2010: Kathi McDonald & Friends – On With The Show
- 2011: Kathi McDonald & Rich Kirch – Nothin' But Trouble (TearDrop Records)
- 2016: On With The Show (Marin Records)

=== Singles ===
- 1966: The Unusuals – "Babe, It's Me"
- 1966: The Unusuals – "Summer Is Over"
- 1974: Kathi McDonald – "Freak Lover" / "Bogart To Bowie" (Capitol 3835)
- 1974: Kathi McDonald – "Bogart To Bowie" / "(Love Is Like A) Heat Wave" (Capitol 3880)
- 1974: Kathi McDonald – "Somethin' Else" / "Threw My Love Away" (Capitol 2C 008–81670)
- 1979: Long John Baldry & Kathi McDonald – "You've Lost That Lovin' Feelin'" (EMI America 8018) – AUS #2
- 1986: Long John Baldry with Kathi McDonald – "Ain't That Peculiar" (Music Line MLS 004)

=== Backing vocal credits ===
- 1970: Ike & Tina Turner and The Ikettes – Come Together (uncredited)
- 1970: Big Brother And The Holding Company – Be a Brother
- 1971: Freddie King – Getting Ready
- 1971: Leon Russell – Leon Russell And The Shelter People
- 1971: Nigel Olsson – Nigel Olsson's Drum Orchestra And Chorus
- 1971: Don Nix – Living By The Days
- 1971: Big Brother And The Holding Company – How Hard It Is
- 1971: Delaney & Bonnie – To Bonnie from Delaney (uncredited)
- 1971: Rita Coolidge – Rita Coolidge (uncredited)
- 1972: Tony Kelly – Bring Me Back
- 1972: Terry Dolan – Terry Dolan
- 1972: The Rolling Stones – Exile On Main St.
- 1972: Grin – All Out
- 1973: Betty Davis – Betty Davis
- 1974: "Rock 'N' Roll Preacher" and "Galilee" on Chuck Girard by Chuck Girard
- 1976: "Stranger In A Strange Land" on Best Of Leon by Leon Russell
- 1976: "Razooli" on Diga by Diga Rhythm Band
- 1978: Quicksilver Messenger Service – Solid Silver
- 1979: Nils Lofgren & Grin – Nils Lofgren & Grin
- 1979: Long John Baldry – Baldry's Out!
- 1983: "Ready To Make Up" and "Don't Give Me The Once Over" on Girls Night Out by Toronto
- 1986: Quicksilver – Peace By Piece
- 1987: Long John Baldry – Long John Baldry & Friends
- 1988: Long John Baldry – A Touch Of The Blues
- 1991: Long John Baldry – It Still Ain't Easy
- 1995: Novato Frank Band – Rock 'N' Roll Heaven
- 1995: John Lee Sanders – World Blue
- 1996: Long John Baldry – Right To Sing The Blues
- 1997: Big Brother And The Holding Company – Can't Go Home Again
- 2001: Long John Baldry – Remembering Leadbelly
- 2009: Long John Baldry – Live – Iowa State University
- 2012: Colin Kadey – A Brief Glimpse of Paradise
