= Ball and Chain (Big Mama Thornton song) =

"Ball and Chain Part 1"

Single by Big Mama Thornton

from the album Ball and Chain
- B-side: "Wade in the Water"
- Released: 1968
- Genre: Blues
- Length: 2:25
- Label: Arhoolie
- Songwriter: Willie Mae Thornton a.k.a. Big Mama Thornton

"Ball and Chain" (also "Ball 'n' Chain" or "Ball & Chain") is a blues song written and recorded by American blues artist Big Mama Thornton. Although her recording did not appear on the record charts, the song has become one of Thornton's best-known, largely due to performances and recordings by Janis Joplin.

== Background and releases ==
In the early 1960s, Thornton recorded several songs for Bay-Tone Records. Two were released on a single, "You Did Me Wrong" and "Big Mama's Blues". A review by Billboard magazine noted "moderate sales potential", but it did not enter the magazine's R&B single chart. According to music writer Gillian Gaar, Thornton also recorded "Ball and Chain" for Bay-Tone, although it was never released.

In 1968, Arhoolie Records released "Ball and Chain". An edited version, titled "Ball and Chain Part 1", was released as a single, while the complete four-and-a-half-minute song is included on a joint album by Thornton, Lightnin' Hopkins, and Larry Williams titled Ball and Chain. Thornton is backed by a small combo with her frequent guitar accompanist Edward "Bee" Houston. She later recorded several live and studio performances of the song, including one on her 1969 Billboard Top 200 album Stronger Than Dirt.

== Janis Joplin / Big Brother and the Holding Company renditions ==
Janis Joplin, who frequently acknowledged Thornton's musical influence, recorded several live performances of "Ball and Chain". According to Big Brother and the Holding Company guitarist James Gurley, Joplin first heard the song during a performance by Thornton at a bar in San Francisco. The group transformed the song into a slow minor-key blues with breaks. They performed the song at the Monterey Pop Festival in 1967 to an enthusiastic audience and critical reception.

The first performance on June 17 was not filmed, so the band was persuaded to perform the song again on the next day. Drastically edited footage of this second performance (cutting out the second verse and a lengthy guitar solo) featured in the 1968 film Monterey Pop, while the full June 17 performance was released in 1993 on the three-disc box set Janis. Another live version of "Ball and Chain", recorded March 8, 1968, at the Fillmore East, was included on Big Brother's 1968 breakthrough album Cheap Thrills. Other live versions are included on Cheaper Thrills, Live at Winterland '68, Live at the Carousel Ballroom 1968, The Woodstock Experience, and In Concert.

== Copyright issues ==
According to Gaar, Thornton originally had recorded the song for Bay-Tone Records in the early 1960s, although the label did not issue it. Gaar adds that "[Bay-Tone held] on to the copyright—which meant that Thornton missed out on the publishing royalties when Janis Joplin recorded the song later in the decade." By another account, Thornton signed an agreement with Bay-Tone which caused problems with later releases. In a 1972 interview, Thornton acknowledged giving Joplin permission to record the song and receiving royalty payments from its sales.

== Recognition ==
Big Mama Thornton's "Ball and Chain" is included on the Rock and Roll Hall of Fame list of the "500 Songs that Shaped Rock and Roll".
