= Nick Gravenites =

American singer-songwriter (1938–2024)

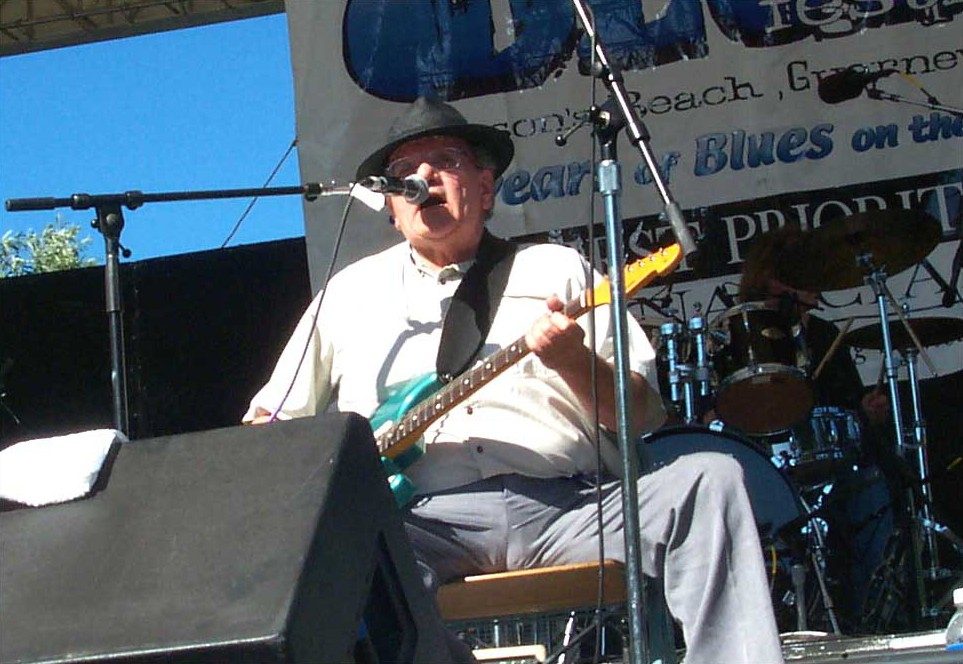
- Gravenites performing in 2006

Background information
- Also known as: Nick "The Greek"; Gravy
- Born: October 2, 1938; Chicago, Illinois, U.S.
- Died: September 18, 2024 (aged 85) Santa Rosa, California, U.S.
- Genres: Rock; blues; folk-rock
- Occupations: Musician; songwriter; record producer
- Instruments: Guitar; vocals
- Labels: Columbia; Warner Bros.
- Formerly of: The Electric Flag; Big Brother and the Holding Company
- Website: nickgravenites.com

Nicholas George Gravenites (/ɡrævɪˈnaɪtɪs/ grav-ih-NY-tis; October 2, 1938 – September 18, 2024) was an American blues, rock and folk singer, songwriter, and guitarist, best known for his work with Electric Flag (as their lead singer), Janis Joplin, Mike Bloomfield, and several influential bands and individuals of the generation springing from the 1960s and 1970s. He sometimes performed under the stage names Nick "The Greek" Gravenites and Gravy.

== Biography ==
Gravenites was born in Chicago on October 2, 1938 to a Greek-speaking family; his parents were from Grevena, Grevena, in Greece. After his father died when he was 11, he worked in the family candy store before he was enrolled at St. John's Northwestern Military Academy; he was expelled for fighting shortly before he was due to graduate. He then attended the University of Chicago, met Paul Butterfield and Mike Bloomfield, became a fan of blues music, and learned guitar.

He regularly patronized clubs where Muddy Waters, Howlin' Wolf, Buddy Guy and other leading blues musicians played. Gravenites spent time both in Chicago and San Francisco in the early 1960s. He wrote the song "Born in Chicago", which became the opening track on the Paul Butterfield Blues Band debut album, and, with guitarist Bloomfield, co-wrote the title track of their second album, East-West; the band was inducted into the Rock and Roll Hall of Fame in 2015.

Gravenites played in clubs with Mike Bloomfield, Charlie Musselwhite and others, and settled in San Francisco in the mid 1960s. In 1967 he formed the Electric Flag with Bloomfield. Gravenites wrote the score for the film The Trip and – together with Mike Bloomfield – wrote and performed most of the soundtrack for the 1973 film Steelyard Blues. According to author and pop music critic Joel Selvin, Gravenites was "the original San Francisco connection for the Chicago crowd."

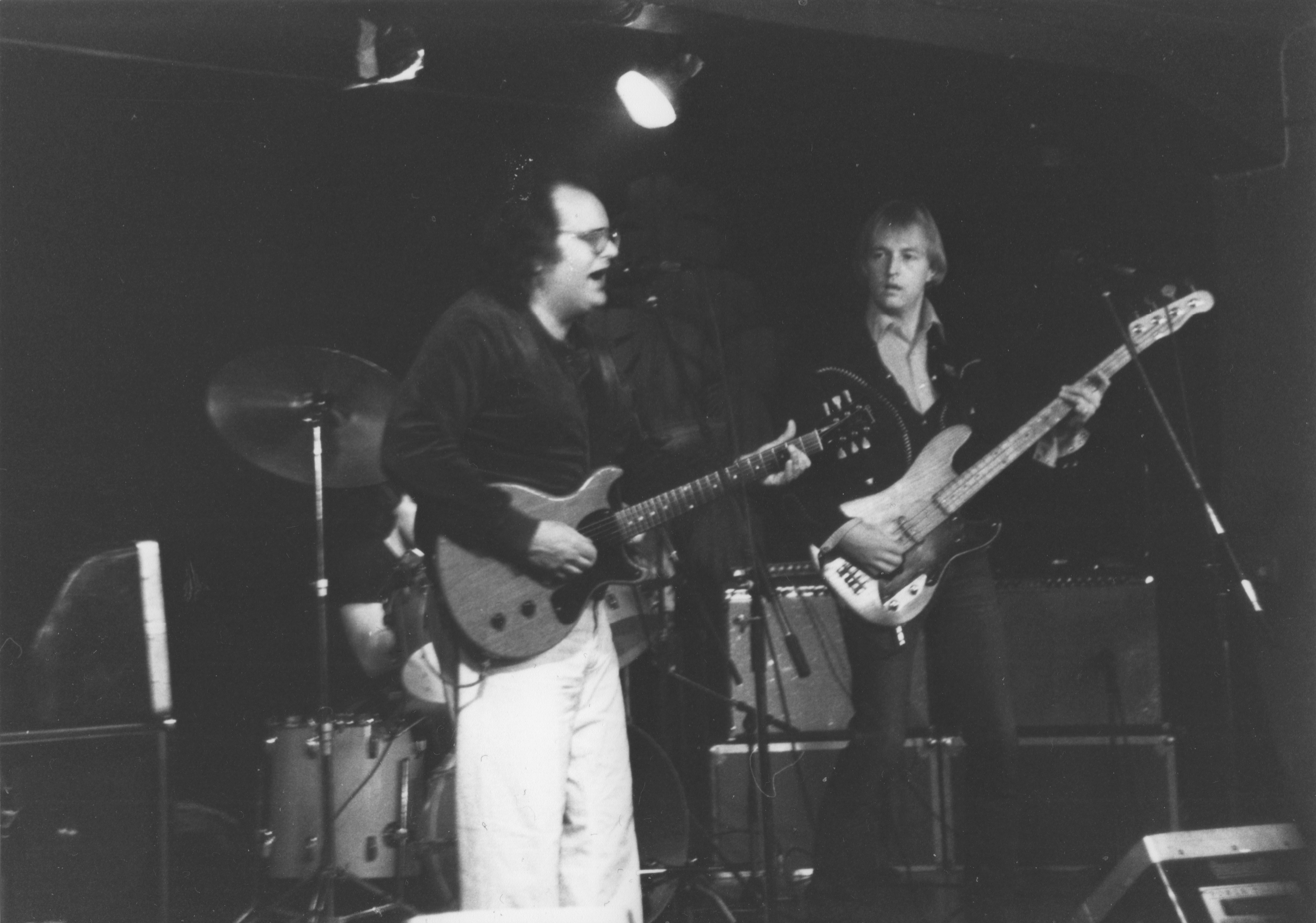
Nick Gravenites and Al Staehely performing in Frankfurt, Germany, 1982

Gravenites was credited as a "musical handyman", helping such San Francisco bands as Quicksilver Messenger Service and Janis Joplin's first solo group, the Kozmic Blues Band. He wrote several songs for Joplin, including "Work Me, Lord" and the unfinished instrumental track "Buried Alive in the Blues". Gravenites was the lead singer in the re-formed Big Brother and the Holding Company (without Joplin) from 1969 to 1972. He also worked extensively with John Cipollina after producing the first album by Quicksilver Messenger Service. He and Cipollina formed the Nick Gravenites–John Cipollina Band, which toured throughout Europe, including a 1987 and a 1989 tour of Greece.

Gravenites produced the pop hit "One Toke Over the Line" for Brewer & Shipley and the album Right Place, Wrong Time for Otis Rush, for which he was nominated for a Grammy Award. He and John Kahn produced the 1970 album Not Mellowed with Age, by Southern Comfort (CBS S 64125). Gravenites often used pianist Pete Sears in his band Animal Mind, including on his 1980 Blue Star album, on which Sears played keyboards and bass.

In the early 1980s, Gravenites performed and recorded with a revolving group of San Francisco Bay area rock, blues, and soul musicians called the Usual Suspects. Their first album, The Usual Suspects, was released in 1981. In the 1980s and 1990s, Gravenites played with Cipollina as Thunder and Lightning. Gravenites and Sears played together in front of 100,000 people on Earth Day 1990 at Crissy Field, San Francisco. Sears also joined him for a tour of Greece. Gravenites continued to perform in northern California. Gravenites’ song "Born in Chicago" was honored by the Blues Hall of Fame in 2003. He toured with the Chicago Blues Reunion and a new Electric Flag Band.

Gravenites was featured in the documentary film Born in Chicago, in which he and several other Chicago natives told of growing up with blues music in Chicago. The film was shown at the SXSW festival in Austin, Texas, in 2013. He moved to Sonoma County, California in 1982, latterly residing in the county's town of Occidental, for at least 30 years. He released his last album Rogue Blues in 2024.

Gravenites, who had been suffering from diabetes and dementia, died in Santa Rosa, California on September 18, 2024, at the age of 85. He is survived by his wife Marcia and two sons, Tim and Steven.

== Discography ==
=== Albums ===
- 1968: A Long Time Comin', the Electric Flag
- 1968: Electric Flag, the Electric Flag
- 1969: My Labors
- 1970: Be a Brother, Big Brother and the Holding Company
- 1971: How Hard It Is, Big Brother and the Holding Company
- 1972: Joplin in Concert
- 1973: Steelyard Blues OST
- 1980: Blue Star (Line Records)
- 1980: Nick's Blues (self-released cassette − no label)
- 1981: The Usual Suspects
- 1982: Monkey Medicine, the Nick Gravenites–John Cipollina Band
- 1991: Live at the Rodon, Athens, Greece, Nick Gravenites and John Cipollina (Music Box)
- 1996: Don't Feed the Animals (issued on Waddling Dog, then reissued by TAXIM)
- 1999: Kill My Brain
- 2005: Buried Alive in the Blues (Chicago Blues Reunion − live)
- 2007: Local Blues (2007 live on It's About Music label)
- 2024: Rogue Blues (M.C. Records)
