= Nine Hundred Nights =

2001 film by Michael Burlingame

Nine Hundred Nights is a 2001 documentary film of the psychedelic band Big Brother and The Holding Company, directed by Michael Burlingame.
