= Cheap Thrills (Big Brother and the Holding Company album) =

Studio album by Big Brother and the Holding Company
- Released: August 12, 1968
- Recorded: March 19 – May 29, 1968 (studio); April 13, 1968 (live)
- Venue: Winterland Ballroom
- Studios: Columbia Recording Studios, Hollywood, CA; Columbia Recording Studios, New York, NY
- Genres: Blues rock; acid rock; psychedelic rock
- Length: 37:11
- Label: Columbia
- Producer: John Simon

Big Brother and the Holding Company chronology
Big Brother & the Holding Company (1967)	Cheap Thrills (1968)	Be a Brother (1970)

Janis Joplin chronology
Big Brother & The Holding Company (1967)	Cheap Thrills (1968)	I Got Dem Ol' Kozmic Blues Again Mama! (1969)

Singles from Cheap Thrills
- 1. "Piece of My Heart" Released: August 1968

Cheap Thrills is the second studio album by American rock band Big Brother and the Holding Company, released on August 12, 1968, by Columbia Records. Cheap Thrills was the band's final album with lead singer Janis Joplin before she left to begin a solo career. Producer John Simon incorporated recordings of crowd noises to give the impression of a live album, for which it was subsequently mistaken by many listeners. Only "Ball and Chain" was actually recorded live in April 13, 1968 at the Winterland Ballroom.

Cheap Thrills was a critical and commercial success, reaching number one on the Billboard Top LPs chart for eight nonconsecutive weeks in 1968. In 2007, Cheap Thrills was inducted into the Grammy Hall of Fame. Rolling Stone magazine ranked the album number 338 in its 2003 list of the "500 Greatest Albums of All Time". It was repositioned to number 372 in the 2020 list.

== History ==
Big Brother obtained a considerable amount of attention after their 1967 performance at the Monterey Pop Festival and had released their debut album soon after. The followup, Cheap Thrills, was a great success, reaching number one on the charts for eight nonconsecutive weeks in 1968. Columbia Records offered the band a new recording contract, but it took seven months to extricate the band from their contract with Mainstream Records. The album features three cover songs ("Summertime", "Piece of My Heart" and "Ball and Chain"). The voice of Bill Graham is heard in the live introduction of the band at the beginning of "Combination of the Two". The album's overall raw sound effectively captures the band's energetic and lively concerts. The LP was released in both stereo and mono formats with the original monophonic pressing now a rare collector's item. The album had been considered for quadraphonic format in the early 1970s, and in 2002, it was released as a multichannel Sony SACD with a 1:38 extended ending to "Piece of My Heart". The original quadraphonic mix remains unreleased.

== Artwork and title ==
The cover was drawn by underground cartoonist Robert Crumb after the band's original cover idea, a photo of the group naked in bed together, was vetoed by Columbia Records. Crumb had originally intended his art for the LP back cover, with a portrait of Janis Joplin to grace the front. However, Joplin, an avid fan of Crumb's work, demanded that Columbia place his illustration on the front cover. It ranks number nine on Rolling Stone's list of 100 greatest album covers. Crumb later authorized the sale of prints of the cover, some of which he signed before sale.

Columbia Records art director John Berg said, "[Janis] Joplin commissioned it, and she delivered Cheap Thrills to me personally in the office. There were no changes with R. Crumb. He refused to be paid, saying, 'I don't want Columbia's filthy lucre.'"

In at least one early edition, the words "HARRY KIRSHNER! (D. GETZ)" are faintly visible in the word balloon of the turbaned man, apparently referring to a track that was dropped from the final sequence. The words "ART: R. CRUMB" replace them.

The album was initially to be titled Sex, Dope and Cheap Thrills, but the title was disallowed by Columbia Records.

The artwork was parodied for the cover of the 2012 album Deep Chills by Lords of Acid.

== Release and reception ==
Cheap Thrills was released in the summer of 1968, one year after Big Brother's debut album, and reached number one on the Billboard Top LPs chart in its eighth week in October. It kept the top spot for eight nonconsecutive weeks, while the single "Piece of My Heart" also became a huge hit. By the end of the year, Cheap Thrills was the most successful album of 1968, having sold nearly a million copies. However, the success was short-lived, as Joplin left the group for a solo career in December 1968.

Outtakes originally to have appeared on the album have since been released on Joplin compilations such as Farewell Song (in which Big Brother's original instruments were replaced with studio musicians from 1983, angering the band) and the Janis compilation box set featuring all original studio songs and live recordings. The 1999 rerelease of Cheap Thrills features the outtakes "Flower in the Sun" and "Roadblock" as well as live performances of "Magic of Love" and "Catch Me Daddy" as bonus material. In 2018, Columbia released Sex, Dope & Cheap Thrills, an album of outtakes and other materials from the Cheap Thrills sessions.

=== Critical reception ===
Professional ratings
Retrospective reviews
Review scores
Source	Rating
AllMusic	5/5 stars
Encyclopedia of Popular Music	4/5 stars
Entertainment Weekly	A−
Q	4/5 stars
The Rolling Stone Album Guide	3.5/5 stars

In a contemporary review, Rolling Stone magazine's John Hardin panned Cheap Thrills: "What this record is not is 1) a well-produced, good rock and roll recording; 2) Janis Joplin at her highest and most intense moments; and 3) better than the Mainstream record issued last year."

Robert Christgau was more enthusiastic in his column for Esquire and called it Big Brother's "first physically respectable effort", as it "not only gets Janis's voice down, it also does justice to her always-underrated and ever-improving musicians." He named it the third-best album of 1968 in his ballot for Jazz & Pop magazine's critics poll.

In a retrospective review in the 2000s, AllMusic's William Ruhlmann hailed Cheap Thrills as Joplin's "greatest moment" and said it sounds like "a musical time capsule [today] and remains a showcase for one of rock's most distinctive singers."

Marc Weingarten of Entertainment Weekly called it the peak of blues rock, while Paul Evans wrote in The Rolling Stone Album Guide (2004) that the album epitomizes acid rock "in all its messy, pseudo-psychedelic glory". Cheap Thrills was ranked number 338 on Rolling Stone magazine's list of the 500 greatest albums of all time, and later ranked number 372 in the 2020 edition. The magazine previously ranked it #50 in its "Top 100 Albums of the Past 20 Years" list in 1987. It is also listed in the book 1001 Albums You Must Hear Before You Die. On March 22, 2013, the album was deemed "culturally, historically, or aesthetically significant" by the Library of Congress and was thus preserved into the National Recording Registry for the 2012 register. The album was named the 163rd best album of the 1960s by Pitchfork.

== Track listing ==
Side one
No.	Title	Writer(s)	Length
1.	"Combination of the Two"	Sam Andrew	5:47
2.	"I Need a Man to Love"	Andrew, Janis Joplin	4:54
3.	"Summertime"	George Gershwin, Ira Gershwin, DuBose Heyward	4:01
4.	"Piece of My Heart"	Bert Berns, Jerry Ragovoy	4:15

Side two
No.	Title	Writer(s)	Length
1.	"Turtle Blues"	Joplin	4:22
2.	"Oh, Sweet Mary"	Peter Albin, Andrew, David Getz, James Gurley, Joplin	4:16
3.	"Ball and Chain"	Big Mama Thornton	9:02

Re-release bonus tracks
No.	Title	Writer(s)	Length
8.	"Roadblock" (Studio outtake)	Joplin, Albin	5:31
9.	"Flower in the Sun" (Studio outtake)	Andrew	3:04
10.	"Catch Me Daddy" (Live at the Grande Ballroom, Detroit, March 2, 1968)	Albin, Andrew, Getz, Gurley, Joplin	5:32
11.	"Magic of Love" (Live at the Grande Ballroom, Detroit, March 2, 1968)	Mark Spoelstra	3:58

== Personnel ==
Big Brother and the Holding Company

- Janis Joplin – vocals
- Sam Andrew – guitar, bass on "Oh, Sweet Mary", vocals
- James Gurley – guitar
- Peter Albin – bass, lead guitar on "Oh, Sweet Mary", lead acoustic guitar on "Turtle Blues"
- Dave Getz – drums

Additional personnel

- John Simon – piano, producer
- Vic Anesini – mastering, mixing
- Nicholas Bennett – packaging manager
- Steven Berkowitz – A&R
- Fred Catero – engineer
- John Byrne Cooke – liner notes
- Robert Crumb – cover artwork
- David Diller – engineer
- Mark Feldman – project director
- David Gahr – photography
- Diana Reid Haig – digital editing, mixing
- Jerry Hochman – engineer
- Bob Irwin – producer, reissue producer
- Elliott Landy – photography, tray photo (gatefold photograph)
- Jim Marshall – photography
- Patti Matheny – A&R
- Elliot Mazer – producer, mixing, assistant producer
- Nathan Rosenberg – digital editing
- Roy Segal – engineer
- Smay Vision – art direction
- Thomas Weir – photography, back cover
- Jen Wyler – editing, mastering, assembly, authoring

== Chart positions ==
1968 weekly chart performance for Cheap Thrills
Chart (1968)	Peak position
Canadian RPM Top 50 Albums	1
US Billboard Top LPs	1
US Best Selling R&B LP's (Billboard)	7
US Cash Box Top 100 Albums	1
US Record World 100 Top LP's	1

== Certifications ==
Region	Certification	Certified units/sales
United States (RIAA)	2× Platinum	2,000,000^{^}
^{^} Shipments figures based on certification alone.
