= Dave Getz =

American musician and artist (born 1940)

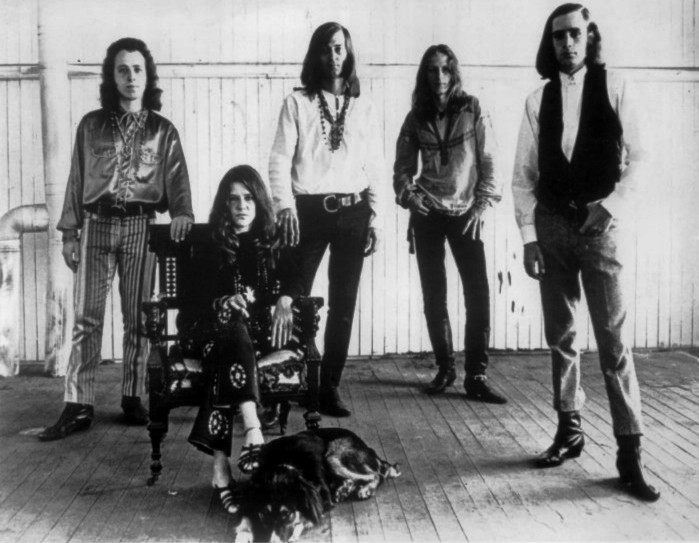
- Big Brother and the Holding Company in the mid 1960s, Getz at the far left

Background information
- Born: January 24, 1940 (age 86); Brooklyn, New York, US
- Genres: rock
- Occupations: Musician, artist
- Instruments: Drums, keyboards
- Years active: 1955–1979, 1987–present
- Member of: Big Brother and the Holding Company
- Formerly of: Country Joe and the Fish

David Getz (born January 24, 1940) is an American musician and artist. In music, he is best known for being the drummer and keyboardist for Big Brother and the Holding Company.

== Early life ==
Getz was born in Brooklyn, New York. Like other Silent Generation youths, he started listening to rhythm and blues music, teaching himself to incorporate its style into his own. He was one of the thousands present at Alan Freed's first rock and roll stage show at the Brooklyn Paramount, during the time that Freed was a deejay at WINS (1010 AM). By the time he was fifteen, Getz was playing drums professionally at jazz music shows being held at hotels and clubs in the Catskill Mountains.

Getz studied at Cooper Union in New York, the Skowhegan School of Painting and Sculpture in Maine, and in 1960 moved to California and received a Master of Fine Arts from the San Francisco Art Institute (SFAI) in 1964. Getz was first introduced to LSD by a member of The Committee in 1962 while the former was working at the Old Spaghetti Factory Cafe. He was awarded a Fulbright Fellowship, and for a year lived in Kraków, Poland. He then went back to SFAI, working as an art teacher from 1965 to 1966, and growing his hair out longer. It was only after Getz was introduced to LSD that he began to abandon his plans to become an artist, pivoting instead to playing music professionally.

== Career ==
Getz was living in San Francisco's Fillmore District as a part of the pre-hippie, and Bohemian artistic, literary and musical scene. He left SFAI in March 1966 to play drums in a Dixieland jazz band. He was later persuaded by bassist friend Peter Albin to join him in a new band called Big Brother and the Holding Company (BB&THC). Although Getz had never heard of Janis Joplin before the day she was signed onto BB&THC as their lead vocalist, he had dreamt the night before of a glamorous frontwoman joining the band. BB&THC gained recognition during the Summer of Love in 1967, which Getz described as "like being at the center of a hurricane". The band secured a 2,500 square feet (230 m^{2}) loft to practice in, a building that has since been demolished and replaced with the Landmark Opera Plaza. Getz commissioned a roadie to construct a small dwelling in the center of the loft under the skylight for him and his then-girlfriend Nancy to live in. But by the time the Monterey International Pop Festival was held that summer, Joplin had become a sensation in her own right, and the bandmates's fortunes began to unravel. In 1968, Getz played on their album Cheap Thrills, which was Joplin's last album performance before she embarked on her solo career. The group briefly disbanded between 1968 and 1969, during which he and Albin joined Country Joe and the Fish and played on one of their albums before leaving in May 1969 and remaking the band. He was in BB&THC until 1972, and until 1979 continued to record and tour in other musical projects. Getz returned to art in 1979 and worked as an art teacher at two schools in Marin County, including San Marin and Novato High School, until the late 1990s.

In 1987, Getz, Albin and James Gurley reformed the Holding Company. Gurley left in 1996, but Getz and Albin are still members of the band, and Getz still creates his own art. In 2025, he released the instrumental album Anthems, Themes & Little Stories.

== Personal life ==
Getz lives in Marin County, California, with his wife Joan, a jazz singer.
