= David Dalton =

David Dalton may refer to:

- David Dalton (writer) (1942–2022), American writer
- David Nigel Dalton, British National Health Service administrator
- David Dalton (violist) (1934–2022), American viola player and author
- David D. Dalton (1822–1894), Secretary of State of Alabama
