= Big Mama Thornton =

American blues singer (Willie Mae Thornton; 1926–1984)

- Thornton, c. 1955–60

Background information
- Born: Willie Mae Thornton; December 11, 1926; Ariton, Alabama, U.S.
- Origin: Oakland, California, U.S.
- Died: July 25, 1984 (aged 57) Los Angeles, California, U.S.
- Genres: Blues; rhythm and blues; Texas blues
- Occupations: Singer; songwriter
- Instruments: Vocals; harmonica; drums
- Years active: 1947–1984
- Labels: Ace; Arhoolie; Back Beat; Bay-Tone; Duke; Galaxy; Irma; Mercury; Peacock; Pentagram; Vanguard

Willie Mae "Big Mama" Thornton (December 11, 1926 – July 25, 1984) was an American singer and songwriter of blues and R&B.

The Encyclopedia of Pop, Rock and Soul described Thornton by saying: "Her booming voice, sometimes 200-pound frame, and exuberant stage manner had audiences stomping their feet and shouting encouragement in R&B theaters from coast to coast from the early 1950s on". Thornton's strong and important vocal style and her confidence on stage made her a huge influence on early blues and rock and roll, even though she rarely received proper credit and compensation for her work.

Thornton was the first to record Leiber and Stoller's "Hound Dog", in 1952, which was written for her. It became Thornton's biggest hit, selling over 500,000 copies and staying seven weeks at No. 1 on the Billboard R&B chart in 1953. According to New York University music professor Maureen Mahon, "the song is seen as an important beginning of rock-and-roll, especially in its use of the guitar as the key instrument".

Thornton's other recordings include her song "Ball and Chain", made famous in the late 1960s by Janis Joplin. Though later recordings of her songs by other artists sold millions of copies, she was denied royalties by not holding the publishing copyrights to her creativity. Thornton died in July 1984 of a heart attack and liver disorders, penniless in a boarding house in Los Angeles, California. Thornton was posthumously inducted into the Rock and Roll Hall of Fame in 2024 under the Musical Influence category.

== Life and career ==
=== Early life and self-taught musicianship ===
Thornton was born on December 11, 1926, the sixth of George and Mattie (née Haynes) Thornton's seven children. While Thornton's birth certificate states that she was born in Ariton, Alabama, in an interview with Arhoolie Records producer Chris Strachwitz, she claimed Montgomery, Alabama, as her birthplace. She was introduced to music in a Baptist church, where her father was a minister and her mother a singer. Thornton said: "I used to go to church a lot, but I didn't do too much singing in church." She was later introduced to gospel music by the church and this heavily influenced her artistic side. Thornton's mother fell gravely ill from tuberculosis. Only 13 years of age, Thornton cared for her mother until her death in the Montgomery Tuberculosis Sanatorium in 1939. At the time Thornton was in the third grade. After losing her mother, she was unable to continue to attend school. Thornton left school and got a job washing and cleaning spittoons in a local tavern.

Thornton's talent was self-taught. She said: "My singing comes from my experience... My own experience. I never had no one teach me nothin'. I never went to school for music or nothin'. I taught myself to sing and to blow harmonica and even to play drums by watchin' other people! I can't read music, but I know what I'm singing! I don't sing like nobody but myself." When Thornton was 8 years old, she taught herself to play the harmonica by watching her older brother, Calliope "Harp" Thornton. Observing the rhythm-and-blues singers Bessie Smith and Memphis Minnie, whom she deeply admired, helped develop her singing talent. "I just started hearing the blues of Bessie Smith, well I was a kid myself, you know. I was a young type of youngster always running around the house humming the blues and my daddy wanted to get me with the razor strap, but I hit the door." Thornton explained her early love of the blues, saying: "My father was a minister. He's a Baptist preacher, and my mother she was very religious. And me, I don't know what I am, I'm -- well, [I] was just born with the blues... I really got the blues, you know, in '39 when I lost my mother, and then I said, 'Well, I don't know what to do'. I said, 'Well, I think I want to sing the blues'. So I said, well, [at] that time, I was listening to Big Maceo, his "Worried Life Blues" and I said 'I think I want to sing that', and I did. That was a beautiful number. Yeah."

=== 1940s: career beginnings ===
Thornton's talent was discovered in 1940 when she was 14 years old. Diamond Teeth Mary, the half-sister of one of her early idols Bessie Smith, encouraged her to enter a talent contest after having heard Thornton singing while working a side-job on a garbage truck. Thornton described the audition during a 1970 Studs Terkel radio interview, saying: "A show came through in the first of the 1940s and they called it 'Sammy Green's Hot Harlem Revue' as I mentioned earlier. They didn't have a singer, and so I asked him, I said, 'Give me an audition, let me sing'. I said, 'I've been singing all the little talent shows around here'. He said, 'Oh, little 'ole girl, you can't sing'. I said, 'Will you give me a try?' He said, 'Yeah, well, when the show start, say we gonna give a little audition for singers, 'cause I'm looking for a singer'. And so he give auditions. So I was there, he wrote my name down, and several people they sung, and then he said, 'Well, I, I want to see what you can do'. So I got up there, I had an old pair of jeans, one leg rolled up, I got up and I started singing one of Louis Jordan's song called "G.I. Jive", and I sung that song, and I sang this blues by Big Maceo, "Worried Life Blues" and he hired me. Out of 25 people, I was the 26th but then he hired me."

Thornton left home at age 14, traveling with Green's show in Alabama and Georgia. Thornton described the revue as "a stage show, like, playing in theaters... dancers, chorus girls, comedians, singers". Originally hired as a dancer, singer, and comedienne, Thornton quickly became known as the "New Bessie Smith" for her vocal talent. Thornton left Green's show in 1948 over a money dispute, about which she said: "I traveled with them for quite a few years, and I went to Houston, Texas in '48. We played there and then we left. As a matter of fact, I quit the show in '48... They owed me a little, quite a bit of money and they wouldn't pay it, and I just got tired."

During her early career, Thornton would occasionally share the stage with fellow Ariton local and blues guitarist J.W. Warren, including performances at local juke joints. The two were romantically involved, and Warren later claimed he was the inspiration for the "hound dog" referenced in Thornton's 1952 hit song, although this claim remains unsubstantiated.

=== 1950s: recording career and "Hound Dog" ===
Thornton moved to Houston and started singing at the Eldorado Ballroom for fifty dollars a night. In 1950, Thornton recorded her first record, "All Right Baby" and "Bad Luck Got My Man", released on Houston's E&W Recording Studio record label and credited to the "Harlem All Stars". Thornton was credited as songwriter on both songs. Thornton moved to the Bronze Peacock Dinner Club, which was owned by impresario and record producer Don Robey. In 1950 she signed a five-year recording contract with Robey's Peacock Records. Her first Peacock record "No Jody For Me / Let Your Tears Fall Baby" was a local hit in the Houston area but did not catch on nationally. Thornton needed additional income to live, so she started shining shoes to get by. In 1952, Don Robey struck a deal with impresario Johnny Otis, allowing Peacock Records artists who had not broken through to national success to travel with Otis' California Rhythm and Blues Caravan to gain experience and exposure. The deal included recording the artists in Los Angeles and giving the recordings to Robey for distribution. Thornton was one of the artists Otis selected.

During the revue's appearance at Harlem's Apollo Theatre in December 1952, Thornton did not have a hit single of her own to sing. She sang a version of the Billy Ward and his Dominoes hit "Have Mercy Baby". The audience went wild for Thornton and would not stop until the stage manager brought the curtain down in order to move the show on. Thornton said: "...that's where they made their mistake. They put me on first. I wasn't out there to put no one off stage. I was out there to get known and I did!... They had to put the curtain down. That's when they put my name in lights. Mr. Frank Shiffman, the manager came back stage hollerin' to Johnny Otis... 'You said you had a star and you got a star. You got to put her on to close the show!" The next night, the Apollo marquee read "Big Mama Thornton".

While working with Otis, Thornton recorded "Hound Dog" in 1952, the first record produced by its writers Jerry Leiber and Mike Stoller. The pair were present at the recording, with Leiber demonstrating the song in the vocal style they had envisioned; Stoller said: "We wanted her to growl it." Thornton said: "Don't tell me how to sing no song", but relented. Otis played drums, after the original drummer was unable to play an adequate part. Thornton's song is credited as helping to usher in the dawn of rock and roll. Thornton realized her record was being broadcast while traveling to a performance in Dayton, Ohio. "I was going to the theater and I just turned the radio on in the car and the man said, 'Here's a record that's going nationwide: "Hound Dog" by Willie Mae Thornton'. I said, That's me! I hadn't heard the record in so long. So when we get to the theater they was blasting it. You could hear it from the theater, from the loudspeaker. They were just playing "Hound Dog" all over the theater. So I goes up in the operating room, I say, 'Do you mind playing that again?'... 'Cause I hadn't heard the record in so long I forgot the words myself. So I stood there while he was playing it, listening to it. So that evening I sang it on the show, and everybody went for it."

"Hound Dog" was Thornton's only hit record, selling more than 500,000 copies, spending 14 weeks in the R&B charts, including seven weeks at No. 1. Even though "Hound Dog" became a big hit, Thornton did not receive the acknowledgement or monetary compensation she deserved for her original record. Although the record made Thornton a star, she reportedly saw little of the profits. Thornton never received full credit for recording the original version of the song. She claimed she received just one royalty check for $500 from her version that spent seven weeks as No. 1 on the 1953 Billboard R&B chart. Rolling Stone quoted her as having said: "Didn't get no money from them at all. Everybody livin' in a house but me. I'm just livin'." Thornton's success with "Hound Dog" was overshadowed three years later when Elvis Presley recorded a hit version of the song. Presley, who did have knowledge of Thornton's recording of the song, had heard a later sanitized version of "Hound Dog" performed by Freddie Bell and the Bellboys, while attending their show at the Sands Hotel in Las Vegas. Bell had removed Thornton's growling declaration of leaving a cheating partner. Bell changed the song; the new lyrics were sung to a literal dog. Presley's version sold ten million copies, so today few people know that "Hound Dog" began as Thornton's "anthem of black Women's power". Contrary to popular belief, Presley did not steal Thornton's version of "Hound Dog"; its co-writer Mike Stoller, who later co-wrote Presley songs such as "Jailhouse Rock" and "King Creole", noted in 2022 that Presley had used the modified Freddie Bell and the Bellboys version.

Thornton continued with Johnny Otis's band between 1951 and 1954. The 30 recordings she made for the Peacock label during that time are considered "remarkable for the vocal presence and total cohesiveness". Thornton performed in R&B package tours with Junior Parker and Esther Phillips and continued to record for Peacock until 1957. Thornton did not have another hit record.

=== Johnny Ace's death ===
While performing Christmas Day 1954 at the City Auditorium in Houston, Texas, Thornton tried to intervene as fellow Duke and Peacock record performer Johnny Ace was playing with a new .32 caliber revolver in the backstage dressing room during that evening's show. In an official deposition taken at 12:40 am the next morning, Thornton said: "I looked over at Johnny and noticed he had a pistol in his hand. It was a pistol that he bought somewhere in Florida. It was a .32 cal. revolver. Johnny was pointing this pistol at Mary Carter and Joe Hamilton. He was kind of waving it around. I asked Johnny to let me see the gun. He gave it to me and when I turned the chamber a .32 cal. bullet fell out in my hand. Johnny told me to put it back in where it wouldn't fall out. I put it back and gave it to him. I told him not to snap it at nobody". Ace did not heed Thornton's advice. "After he got the pistol back, Johnny pointed the pistol at Mary Carter and pulled the trigger. It snapped... I told Johnny again not to snap the pistol at anybody. Johnny then put the pistol to Olivia's head and pulled the trigger. It snapped. Johnny said 'I'll show you that it won't shoot'. He held the pistol up and looked at it first and then put it to his head. I started toward the door and I heard the pistol go off. I turned around and saw Johnny falling to the floor. I saw that he was shot and I run on stage and told the people in the band about it. I stayed there until the officers arrived."

=== 1960s: "Ball and Chain" and continued success ===
As her career began to fade in the late 1950s and early 1960s, Thornton left Houston and relocated to the San Francisco Bay area, playing clubs in San Francisco and Los Angeles. Her performances were infrequent so she could not retain a steady group of musicians to back her. Chris Strachwitz said that when Thornton was booked to perform in a good venue like the Fillmore, her manager at the time, Jim Moore, would hire "lounge musicians. He called them 'jazz musicians' or whatever... they had no clue what the blues was all about. They were mediocre at the best." While living in the Bay Area, Thornton recorded for a succession of labels, including Irma, Bay-Tone, Carolyn, Sotoplay, Kent, and the Berkeley-based Arhoolie Records.

In 1961 Thornton wrote another signature song, "Ball And Chain". The song relates the feelings of a woman who has been mistreated by her partner. Thornton assigned the song's copyright in 1961 to Bay-Tone Records, a small, independent San Francisco record company. Bay-Tone released two of Thornton's singles, including "You Did Me Wrong" b/w "Big Mama's Blues". However, the label chose not to release her "Ball And Chain" recording and instead held on to the copyright. Throughout her musical journey Thornton wrote a lot of blues songs like "Ball and Chain," which with time became famed and well known through Janis Joplin's presentations. This caused Thornton to once again miss out on the publishing royalties when her song was recorded by another artist and became a hit. During her later efforts to secure the royalties from the song, Thornton described how she had written the song 9 years before she recorded it, saying: "I was singing that way before I recorded it."

After hearing Thornton perform the song at the Both/And Club on Divisadero Street in San Francisco, Big Brother and the Holding Company's vocalist Janis Joplin and guitarist James Gurley approached her and asked permission to cover "Ball And Chain". Thornton agreed. Gurley slowed the blues song, using a minor key. The band performed their version of "Ball And Chain" at the 1967 Monterey Pop Festival. The crowd was stunned. Band guitarist Sam Andrew joked: "This was no 'wear flowers in your hair' song." Subsequently, the band released their version of the song on their album Cheap Thrills in August 1968. The album remained at the top spot of the Billboard Hot 200 charts for two months. Joplin's interpretation of the song renewed interest in Thornton, boosting her career. In a 1972 interview, Thornton acknowledged receiving royalty payments after having given Joplin permission to record her song, saying: "I gave her the right and the permission to make 'Ball 'n' Chain' ... It's all right, it made me money. At least I got paid for it, and I'm still drawing royalties." With the success of Big Brother's Cheap Thrills album, Arhoolie Records released Thornton's recording of "Ball And Chain" as a way to capitalize on the success of Joplin's cover.

In 1965, Thornton toured Europe with the American Folk Blues Festival, where she was "celebrated by adoring fans". Reviews of the tour said: "Thornton dazzles European audiences who are experiencing her live for the first time." Her success was notable "because very few female blues singers at that time had ever enjoyed success across the Atlantic". While in London on October 20, she recorded her first album for Arhoolie, Big Mama Thornton – In Europe. It featured backing by blues veterans Buddy Guy (guitar), Walter "Shakey" Horton (harmonica), Eddie Boyd (piano), Jimmy Lee Robinson (bass), and Fred Below (drums), except for two songs (and a third as a bonus track on the 2005 CD reissue) on which Fred McDowell provided acoustic slide guitar. Music producer Chris Strachwitz said in the album's liner notes: "Willie Mae 'Big Mama' Thornton is in my opinion the greatest female blues singer of this and any other decade." In 1966, Thornton recorded her second album for Arhoolie, Big Mama Thornton and the Chicago Blues Band with the Muddy Waters Blues Band including Muddy Waters (guitar), Sammy Lawhorn (guitar), James Cotton (harmonica), Otis Spann (piano), Luther "Guitar Junior" Johnson (bass guitar), and Francis Clay (drums). Thornton performed at the Monterey Jazz Festival in 1966 and 1968. Her last album for Arhoolie, Ball And Chain, a special compilation/anthology, was released in 1968. It was made up of 5 tracks by Lightnin' Hopkins, 3 tracks by Larry Williams, plus Thornton's recordings of her composition "Ball And Chain" and the standard "Wade in the Water" added on. A small combo, including her frequent guitarist Edward "Bee" Houston, provided backup for the latter two songs.

By 1969, Thornton had signed with Mercury Records, which released her most successful album, Stronger Than Dirt, which reached No. 198 on the Billboard Top 200 record chart. Next, Thornton signed a contract with Pentagram Records and finally fulfilled one of her biggest dreams. A blues woman and the daughter of a preacher, Thornton loved the blues and what she called the "good singing" of gospel artists like the Dixie Hummingbirds and Mahalia Jackson. She had always wanted to record a gospel record, and did so with the album Saved (PE 10005). The album includes the gospel classics "Oh, Happy Day", "Down By The Riverside", "Glory, Glory Hallelujah", "He's Got the Whole World in His Hands", "Lord Save Me", "Swing Low, Sweet Chariot", "One More River", and "Go Down Moses". By then, the American blues revival had come to an end. While the original blues acts like Thornton mostly played smaller venues, younger people played their versions of blues in massive arenas for big money. Because the blues had seeped into other genres of music, the blues musician no longer needed impoverishment or geography for substantiation; the style was enough.

=== 1970s and 1980s: later career ===
Thornton's work offers had become fewer and smaller, but things changed for good in 1972 when she was asked to rejoin the American Folk Blues Festival tour. She thought of Europe as a good place for herself and, with the lack of engagements in the United States, she agreed happily. The tour, beginning on March 2, 1972, took Thornton to Germany, France, Switzerland, Austria, Italy, the Netherlands, Denmark, Norway, Finland, and Sweden, where it ended on March 27 in Stockholm. With her on the bill were Eddie Boyd, Big Joe Williams, Robert Pete Williams, T-Bone Walker, Paul Lenart, Hartley Severns, Edward Taylor, and Vinton Johnson. As in 1965, they garnered recognition and respect from other musicians who wanted to see them.

In the 1970s, the damage from years of heavy drinking began to visibly affect Thornton's health. She was in a serious auto accident but recovered to perform at the 1973 Newport Jazz Festival with Muddy Waters, B.B. King, Eddie "Cleanhead" Vinson, Clarence "Gatemouth" Brown, Arthur "Big Boy" Crudup, and Jay "Hootie" McShann. The Blues... A Real Summit Meeting, a recording of this performance, was released by Buddha Records. Thornton's last albums were Jail and Sassy Mama! for Vanguard Records in 1975. Jail captured her performances during mid-1970s concerts at two prisons in the northwestern United States. Other songs from this recording session were released in 2000 on Big Mama Swings (the third disc in The Complete Vanguard Recordings set). She was backed by a blues ensemble that featured sustained jams by George "Harmonica" Smith and included guitarists Bee Houston and Steve Wachsman, pianist J. D. Nicholson, saxophonist Bill Potter, bassist Bruce Sieverson, and drummer Todd Nelson. She toured extensively throughout the United States and Canada, and played at the Juneteenth Blues Fest in Houston, sharing the bill with John Lee Hooker.

She performed at the San Francisco Blues Festival in 1979 and the Newport Jazz Festival in 1980. Thornton also performed in the "Blues Is a Woman" concert that year, alongside Sippie Wallace, sporting a man's three-piece suit, straw hat, and gold watch. She sat at center stage and played pieces she wanted to play, which were not on the program. Thornton took part in the Tribal Stomp at Monterey Fairgrounds, the Third Annual Sacramento Blues Festival, and the Los Angeles Bicentennial Blues with B.B. King and Muddy Waters. She was a guest on an ABC-TV special hosted by actor Hal Holbrook and was joined by Aretha Franklin and toured through the club scene. She was also part of the award-winning PBS television special Three Generations of the blues with Sippie Wallace and Jeannie Cheatham.

=== Death and burial ===
Thornton was found dead at age 57 by medical personnel in a Los Angeles boarding house on July 25, 1984. She died of heart and liver disorders caused by her longstanding alcohol abuse. She had lost 355 pounds (161 kg) in a short time as a result of illness, her weight dropping from 450 to 95 pounds (204 to 43 kg). Thornton was buried in Inglewood Park Cemetery in Los Angeles County, California. Her pauper's grave features a small granite marker with two additional names, indicating her body was buried along with two strangers.

Summing up her life, Thornton said: "I've been happy. There have been dull moments, but you have to take as worse as you going to get it or else you are never going to see it. And I've been happy and I'd like to stay that way."

== Style ==
Thornton's performances were characterized by her deep, powerful voice and strong sense of self. She was given her nickname "Big Mama" by Frank Schiffman, the manager of Harlem's Apollo Theater, because of her strong voice, size, and personality. Thornton stated that she was louder than any microphone and did not want a microphone to ever be as loud as she was. Her voice was often depicted as fresh, eloquent, and resonant, founded on the gospel music she was exposed to as a child in Alabama. Alice Echols, the author of a biography of Janis Joplin, said that Thornton could sing in a "pretty voice" but did not want to.

Her style was heavily influenced by gospel music that she listened to growing up in the home of a preacher, though her genre could be described as blues. Thornton was quoted in a 1980 article in The New York Times: "When I was comin' up, listening to Bessie Smith and all, they sung from their heart and soul and expressed themselves. That's why when I do a song by Jimmy Reed or somebody, I have my own way of singing it. Because I don't want to be Jimmy Reed, I want to be me. I like to put myself into whatever I'm doin' so I can feel it."

Scholars such as Maureen Mahon have praised Thornton for subverting traditional roles of Black or African-American women. She added a Black woman's voice to a field that was dominated by white males, and her strong personality transgressed stereotypes of what a Black or African-American woman should be. This transgression was an integral part of her performance and stage persona.

Scholar Tyina Steptoe has written that Thornton's gender nonconformity helped to establish rock 'n' roll as a rebellious form of music. She says that Thornton should be understood as queer. Music historian Evelyn McDonnell remarked: "If you go back and look at Bessie Smith, Big Mama Thornton — they were not publicly identifying themselves as queer, necessarily, but clearly signaling in their lyrics and dressing in suits".

== Legacy ==
During her career, Thornton was nominated for Blues Music Awards six times.

In addition to "Ball 'n' Chain" and "They Call Me Big Mama," Thornton wrote 20 blues songs. Her "Ball 'n' Chain" is included in the Rock and Roll Hall of Fame list of the "500 Songs That Shaped Rock and Roll". Thornton was overlooked and unrewarded throughout her journey. Scholars say this happened because of racial and gender inequalities that ruled the music business in American at the time. It was not until Janis Joplin covered Thornton's "Ball 'n' Chain" that it became a hit. Though Thornton did not receive financial compensation for her song, Joplin arranged for Thornton to open shows for her. Joplin found her singing voice through Thornton, who praised Joplin's version of "Ball 'n' Chain", saying: "That girl feels like I do."

Thornton subsequently received greater recognition for her popular songs, but she is still under appreciated for her influence on the blues, rock and roll, and soul music. Thornton's music was also influential in shaping American popular music. The lack of appreciation she received for "Hound Dog" and "Ball 'n' Chain" as they became popular hits is representative of the lack of recognition she received during her career as a whole. Many critics argue that Thornton's lack of recognition in the music industry is a reflection of an era of racial segregation in the United States, both physically and in the music industry. Scholars suggest that Thornton's lack of access to broader audiences (both white and black), may have been a barrier to her commercial success as both a vocalist and a composer.

In 2004, the non-profit Willie Mae Rock Camp for Girls, named for Thornton, was founded to offer a musical education to girls from ages 8 to 18. The first biography of Thornton, Big Mama Thornton: The Life and Music, by Michael Spörke, was published in 2014.

In 2022, Thornton was featured as a character in Elvis, a biopic about Elvis Presley. In the movie, Thornton (played by Shonka Dukureh in her only film role, as she died shortly after the film's release) is shown as the original singer of "Hound Dog" and appears in the movie singing the song. Presley (played by Austin Butler) hears Thornton sing "Hound Dog" at a concert and decides to record a cover of the song. Dukureh's performance of "Hound Dog" was included in full on the movie soundtrack. The movie and soundtrack were both critical and commercial hits, giving greater public attention to Thornton.

In 2024, Thornton was selected for induction into the Rock and Roll Hall of Fame in the musical influence category.

In April 2026, a documentary titled Big Mama Thornton: I Can’t Be Anyone But Me, directed by Robert Clem, was released.

== Accolades ==
- 1953: "Hound Dog" (Single), Peacock Records, Best Rhythm and Blues song, Cash Box magazine
- 1979: San Francisco Blues Festival Award
- 1984: Inductee, Blues Hall of Fame, Blues Foundation, Memphis, Tennessee
- 2006: Classic of Blues Recording - Single or Album Track, "Hound Dog" (Single), Peacock Records, Blues Hall of Fame, Blues Foundation, Memphis, Tennessee
- 2013: GRAMMY Hall Of Fame Award, "Hound Dog" (Single), Peacock Records (1953)
- 2017: Inductee, National Recording Registry, "Hound Dog" (Single), Peacock Records, Library of Congress, Washington, DC
- 2020: Inductee, Alabama Music Hall of Fame, Tuscumbia, Alabama
- 2024: Inductee, Rock and Roll Hall of Fame, Musical influence category, Cleveland, Ohio

== Discography ==
=== Studio albums ===
List of studio albums, with selected chart positions
Title	Details	Peak chart positions
Title	Details	US
In Europe	Released: June 1966; Label: Arhoolie 1028	—
Big Mama Thornton and the Chicago Blues Band	Released: May 1967; Label: Arhoolie 1032	—
Stronger Than Dirt	Released: August 1969; Label: Mercury	198
Saved	Released: 1971; Label: Pentagram	—
Sassy Mama!	Released: 1975; Label: Vanguard	—
"—" denotes a recording that did not chart or was not released in that territory.

=== Live albums ===
List of live albums, with selected details
Title	Details
The Way It Is	Released: December 1969; Label: Mercury
The Blues... "A Real Summit Meeting" (Recorded Live at Newport in New York)	Released: 1973; Label: Buddah
Jail	Released: 1975; Label: Vanguard
Live at Newport (with Muddy Waters and B.B. King)	Released: 1982; Label: Intermedia
The Rising Sun Collection [reissued as Sassy Mama: Live at the Rising Sun Celebrity Jazz Club]	Released: 1994; Label: Just a Memory/Justin Time

=== Compilation albums ===
List of compilation albums, with selected details
Title	Details
Ball And Chain (with Lightnin' Hopkins and Larry Williams recordings)	Released: 1968; Label: Arhoolie 1039
She's Back	Released: 1970; Label: Back Beat
Mama's Pride	Released: 1978; Label: Vanguard
Quit Snoopin' Round My Door	Released: 1986; Label: Ace
Ball 'n' Chain (CD compilation with all Big Mama Thornton recordings)	Released: 1989; Label: Arhoolie
You Ole Houn' Dawg	Released: 1989; Label: Ace
The Original Hound Dog	Released: 1990; Label: Ace
They Call Me Big Mama	Released: 1991; Label: MCA
Hound Dog: The Peacock Recordings	Released: 1992; Label: MCA
The Big Change	Released: 1996; Label: Altaya
Hound Dog: The Essential Collection	Released: 1999; Label: Spectrum Music
The Complete Vanguard Recordings	Released: April 18, 2000; Label: Vanguard
The Chronological Big Mama Thornton 1950–1953	Released: 2004; Label: Classics (Blues & Rhythm series)
A Proper Introduction to Big Mama Thornton: They Called Me Big Mama	Released: 2005; Label: Proper
Blues	Released: 2006; Label: Disky
Vanguard Visionaries	Released: 2007; Label: Vanguard
The Complete 1950–1961	Released: 2013; Label: Le Chant du Monde
Rock-A-Bye-Baby (The 1950–1961 Recordings)	Released: 2014; Label: Hoodoo
The Essential Recordings	Released: March 31, 2017; Label: Primo
The Story of My Blues: The Complete Singles A's & B's 1951–1961	Released: July 12, 2019; Label: Jasmine
The Very Best of Big Mama Thornton	Released: October 2019; Label: Not Now Music
The Singles Collection 1950–1961	Released: June 19, 2020; Label: Acrobat
The Best of Big Mama Thornton 1951–1958	Released: July 14, 2023; Label: Acrobat

=== Singles ===
List of singles, with selected chart positions
Title	Year	Peak chart positions	Album
Title	Year	US R&B	Album
"Partnership Blues"	1951	—	Non-album singles
"No Jody for Me"	1951	—	Non-album singles
"Every Time I Think of You"	1952	—	Non-album singles
"Hound Dog"	1953	1	Non-album singles
"They Call Me Big Mama"	1953	—	Non-album singles
"I Ain't No Fool Either"	1953	—	Non-album singles
"I Smell a Rat"	1954	—	Non-album singles
"Stop Hoppin' on Me"	1954	—	Non-album singles
"Rock a Bye Baby"	1954	—	Non-album singles
"The Fish"	1955	—	Non-album singles
"Tarzan and the Dignified Monkey" (with Elroy Peace)	1955	—	Non-album singles
"Just Like a Dog (Barking Up the Wrong Tree)"	1957	—	Non-album singles
"Don't Talk Back"	1958	—	Non-album singles
"You Did Me Wrong"	1961	—	Non-album singles
"Mercy"	1963	—	Non-album singles
"Tom Cat"	1964	—	Non-album singles
"Before Day (Big Mama's Blues)"	1965	—	Non-album singles
"Swing It on Home"	1966	—	In Europe
"Because It's Love"	1966	—	Non-album singles
"Their Ain't Nothing You Can Do, Part 1"	1967	—	Non-album singles
"Don't Do Me This Way"	1967	—	Non-album singles
"Ball and Chain, Part 1"	1968	—	Ball and Chain
"Let's Go Get Stoned"	1969	—	Stronger Than Dirt
"—" denotes a recording that did not chart or was not released in that territory.

== See also ==
- List of blues musicians

== Bibliography ==
- Spörke, Michael (2014). Big Mama Thornton: The Life and Music. Jefferson, North Carolina: McFarland. ISBN 978-0-7864-7759-3.
