= Mary Bridget Davies =

American singer and actress

- Born: August 30, 1978 (age 46); Cleveland, Ohio, U.S
- Genres: soul, jazz, rock, blues,
- Occupation(s): Singer-songwriter, actress
- Years active: 2005–present

Mary Bridget Davies (born August 30, 1978) is an American singer and actress. She performs with her own band, The Mary Bridget Davies Group, and is also an interpreter of Janis Joplin's music. She received a Tony Award nomination for Best Lead Actress in a Musical for her performance as Janis in A Night with Janis Joplin. Her band The Mary Bridget Davies Group released an album with original songs in 2012 titled Wanna Feel Somethin.

== Personal life ==
Davies is the daughter of Mary Ellen, a nurse, and Brian Davies, also a musician. She grew up in the Cleveland area and graduated from Fairview High School in 1996. In high school, Davies performed in the Honor Choir, acted in productions with the school theatre troupe the Stagecrafters, and was a vocalist with the Jazz Band. She then attended Kent State University and later transferred to Bowling Green State University where she was involved with theatre and music. While in college, she worked at The UPS Store loading package trucks to help pay the bills. She trained first as a dancer, touring with dance productions as a child working with Tina Landon, and later began singing and acting. Davies has studied improv with The Second City in Cleveland and is also a member of the Something Dada Improv Group in Cleveland. Davies has lived and performed in Kansas City, New York City, and currently lives in Cleveland. In late 2017 she gave birth to her first child, a son.

== Career ==
After college, Davies started singing at blues jams in Cleveland around 2002. Also during this time, she worked as a dance instructor at Dance Dimensions in Ohio with Jen Naso. In 2005, she auditioned and won the lead role for a touring production of Love, Janis. She has toured in Europe with Janis Joplin's original band, Big Brother and the Holding Company, and has formed her own band, titled The Mary Bridget Davies Group that tours in festivals and clubs worldwide.

In 2012, Davies took over the lead role in A Night with Janis Joplin on tour, and stayed with the show when it moved to Off-Broadway and eventually Broadway in 2013, closing February 9, 2014. Davies was nominated for a Tony Award for Best Lead Actress in a Musical for her performance. She had previously been nominated in 2013 for a Helen Hayes Award for Best Lead Actress in a Musical. Davies has also performed in a tour of the musical revue It Ain't Nothin' But the Blues.

Ms. Davies kicked off 2014 with performances at SXSW and a four-night residency in Pasadena, CA where she was joined by The Doors’ Robby Krieger, Slash, The MC5's Wayne Kramer, Dave & Phil Alvin of The Blasters, Bob Mothersbaugh of DEVO, Jesse Malin, and members of Tom Morello's Nightwatchmen and Gnarls Barkley.

Career Highlights

- Recipient of the BEST VOCALIST AWARD by the Cleveland Free Times
- 2005 International Blues Challenge FINALIST
- Won award for BEST MOMENT IN THEATRE 2007 by the Kansas City Pitch for the role as Janis Joplin in the Off-Broadway smash musical, Love, Janis
- 2011 International Blues Challenge Second place WINNER
- 2012 Two Blues Blast Award Nominations for "Best New Artist Debut CD" and "Sean Costello Rising Star”
- 2013 Blues Music Award Nomination for Best New Artist Debut
