= Big Brother and the Holding Company =

American rock band

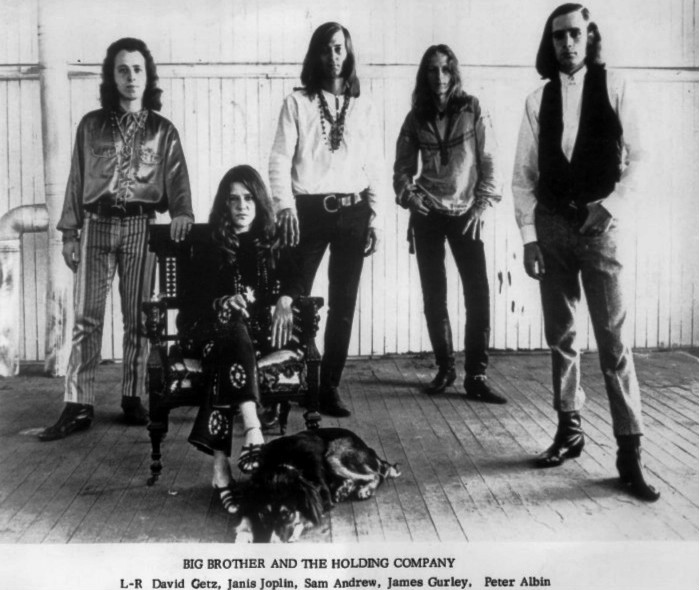
- Left to right: Getz, Joplin, Andrew, Gurley, Albin, c. 1967

Background information
- Origin: San Francisco, California
- Genres: Psychedelic rock; acid rock; blues rock
- Years active: 1965–1968, 1969–1972, 1987–present
- Labels: Columbia; Mainstream; Warner
- Members: Peter Albin; Dave Getz; Tom Finch; Darby Gould; David Aguilar; Kate Russo Thompson
- Past members: Sam Andrew; James Gurley; Chuck Jones; Janis Joplin; Nick Gravenites; Michel Bastian; Kathi McDonald; Dave Schallock; Mike Finnigan; Ben Nieves; Cathy Richardson; Tommy Odetto
- Website: bbhc.com

Big Brother and the Holding Company are an American rock band that was formed in San Francisco in 1965 as part of the same psychedelic music scene that produced the Grateful Dead, Quicksilver Messenger Service, and Jefferson Airplane. After some initial personnel changes, the band became well known with the lineup of vocalist Janis Joplin, guitarists Sam Andrew and James Gurley, bassist Peter Albin, and drummer Dave Getz. Their second album Cheap Thrills, released in 1968, is considered one of the masterpieces of the psychedelic sound of San Francisco; it reached number one on the Billboard charts, and was ranked number 338 in Rolling Stone's the 500 greatest albums of all time. The album is also listed in the book 1001 Albums You Must Hear Before You Die.

Joplin left the band in 1968, following the recording of Cheap Thrills, for a successful solo career. The band recruited as new members Nick Gravenites, Kathi McDonald, and Dave Schallock to replace her, and released two more albums before breaking up in 1972. The classic lineup (minus Joplin, who had died in 1970) reunited in 1987. The band has continued to perform ever since, with a variety of different lead singers including Michel Bastian who was one of the earliest female vocalists that replaced Janis Joplin. She sang with Big Brother and The Holding Company from 1987 through 1996. James Gurley left for a solo career in 1997 and died in 2009. Sam Andrew died in 2015.

== History ==
=== Roots in San Francisco ===
Peter Albin was a country and blues guitarist who had played with future Grateful Dead's founders Jerry Garcia and Ron McKernan. Albin met Sam Andrew, a professional rock guitarist with a jazz and classical background. After playing together at Albin's home, Andrew suggested they could form a band. The pair approached guitarist James Gurley, and the resulting trio played open jam sessions hosted by entrepreneur Chet Helms in 1965. Helms found them a drummer, Chuck Jones, and "Big Brother and the Holding Company" was formed at their first gig, the Trips Festival in January 1966. The audience included painter and jazz drummer David Getz, who soon replaced Jones.

Big Brother went on to become the house band at the Avalon Ballroom, playing a progressive style of instrumental rock. Feeling a need for a strong vocalist, Helms dispatched his friend Travis Rivers to Austin, Texas to invite Helms’ longtime friend Janis Joplin to join Big Brother. She was considering joining The 13th Floor Elevators to work with Roky Erickson; that band that was based in Austin. Instead, she traveled with Rivers from Austin to San Francisco and debuted with Big Brother at the Avalon on June 10, 1966.

=== Janis Joplin ===
Joplin sang for the first time with Big Brother in 1966. Years later, Andrew described the band's first impressions of her:

We were the established rock and roll band. We were heavy. We were like: all right, out of three or four bands in this city, we are one of them. We're in the newspapers all the time. We're working out. We are doing this woman a favor to even let her come and sing with us. She came in and she was dressed like a little Texan. She didn't look like a hippie, she looked like my mother, who is also from Texas. She sang real well but it wasn't like, "Oh we're bowled over." It was probably more like, our sound was really loud. It was probably bowling her over. I am sure we didn't turn down enough for her. She wrote letters home about how exotic all of us were. The names of the bands. That kind of thing. In other words, we weren't flattened by her and she wasn't flattened by us. It was probably a pretty equal meeting. She was real intelligent, Janis was, and she always rose to the occasion. She sang the songs. It wasn't like this moment of revelation like you would like it to be. Like in a movie or something. It wasn't like, "Oh my God, now we have gone to heaven. We have got Janis Joplin." I mean she was good but she had to learn how to do that. It took her about a year to really learn how to sing with an electric band.

It took a while for some of the band's followers to accept the new singer, whose musical style differed from the experimental and unconventional sound that Big Brother played at the time. With the addition of Joplin, they became more disciplined musicians, their songs adopted a more traditional structure, and the band started to increase its popularity in the San Francisco psychedelic scene.

=== Mainstream Records debut ===
In September 1966, the band was stranded in Chicago after finishing a gig at a venue called Mother Blues located on Wells Street. The venue's owner paid them for two weeks' worth of concerts but it was not enough to buy plane tickets back to San Francisco. While there, Big Brother signed a contract with Mainstream Records and attempted to record four songs for a debut album eventually released as Big Brother & the Holding Company, although these initial sessions proved unsatisfactory. When they returned to California in October two songs were recorded in Los Angeles, while the remainder of the record was recorded there from December 12–14, produced by Mainstream's owner Bob Shad. Mainstream was known for its jazz records, and Big Brother was the first rock band to appear on the label. This may have influenced the final result, since the album sounded very different from what the band expected: the acid-rock guitar distortion and lengthy jams typical of their stage act were completely absent, replaced by clean, low-key instrumental tones and tight, two minute song lengths.

"Blind Man" b/w "All Is Loneliness", both from the early sessions in Los Angeles, became the group's first single in October 1966. It was popular in the San Francisco Bay Area, but did not garner any national attention. A second single, "Down on Me" b/w "Call On Me" was released in March 1967, with "Bye Bye Baby" following along with the album in August after the band's national success at the Monterey Pop Festival. The album debuted on Billboard charts on September 2, 1967, peaking at No. 60. It stayed on the charts for a total of 30 weeks.

The Pop Chronicles criticized the record as difficult to find and "technically disappointing". "Down On Me" had a long gestation in the marketplace and finally debuted on the Billboard Hot 100 chart on August 31, 1968, peaking at No. 43. It stayed on the charts for 8 weeks. Other singles from the album were released through the end of 1967 and in 1968. "Coo Coo" b/w "The Last Time", was released in January, 1968. These last songs were from the original 1966 album sessions, but were not included on the LP until Columbia acquired all of the band's Mainstream recordings and reissued the album in the 1970s.

In the summer of 1966, the band members moved to Lagunitas, in Marin County, California, to a house that had been originally built by the ethnologist Clinton Hart Merriam. They lived in there until the beginning of 1967 at which time they put an ad in the San Francisco Oracle with the apparent intention of moving back to the "City". The ad read: "Big Brother is returning to the city. Need rehearsal hall and a place to live. Write to B.B.& the H.C. at Box 94 Lagunitas." On October 6 they performed a set at the Love Pageant Rally, the first outdoor Haight-Ashbury festival held on the same day LSD was made illegal in California.

=== Mantra-Rock Dance ===
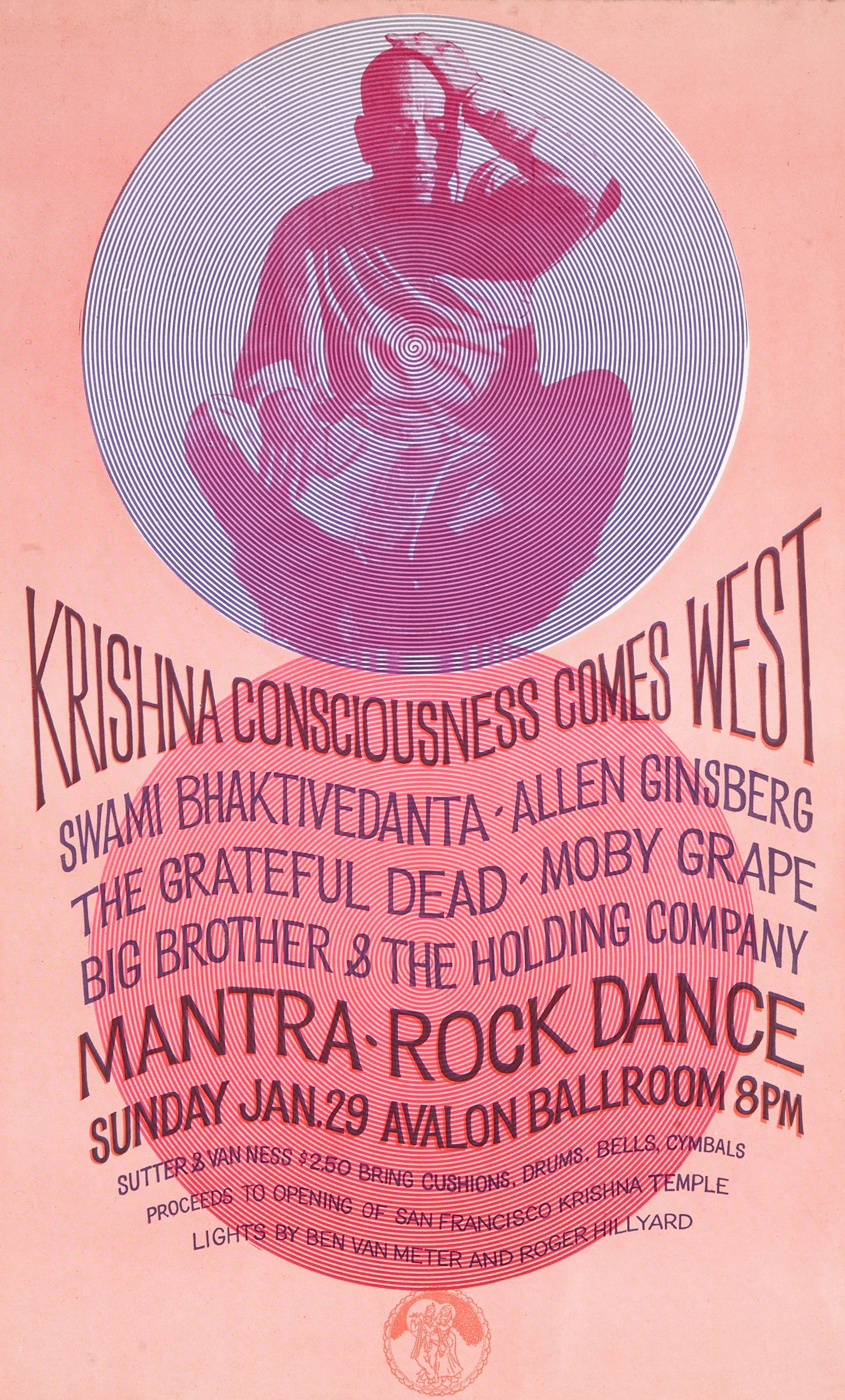
The Mantra-Rock Dance poster featuring Big Brother and the Holding Company

One of the band's earliest major performances in 1967 was the Mantra-Rock Dance—a musical event held on January 29, 1967, at the Avalon Ballroom by the San Francisco Hare Krishna temple. Big Brother and Janis Joplin performed there along with Hare Krishna founder Bhaktivedanta Swami, Allen Ginsberg, Moby Grape, and Grateful Dead, donating proceeds to the Krishna temple.

=== Monterey Pop Festival ===
The band's historic performance at the Monterey Pop Festival in June 1967 attracted national and international attention. The band was scheduled to play on Saturday afternoon, with a set which included "Down on Me", "Combination of The Two", "Harry", "Roadblock" and "Ball and Chain". However, the band's manager decided not to allow Pennebaker's film crew to film and record them without paying them, and ordered the crew to turn its cameras off. The festival promoters thought the band performance was great, and asked them to play again the next evening in order to record it on film, but they played only two songs: "Combination of The Two" and "Ball and Chain". "I remember being amazed that this white woman was singing like Bessie Smith," said Michelle Phillips once. "I was astounded". They signed a contract with Columbia Records, which was able to buy out their contract from Mainstream. In late November, Albert Grossman, who was then managing Bob Dylan, Peter, Paul and Mary and several other acts became their manager.

=== National success ===
Having received national recognition after the Monterey Pop Festival, Big Brother was booked by Grossman for engagements around the country. One of those engagements was for opening night at Chet Helms’ The Family Dog Denver on September 8–9, 1967 along with Blue Cheer. A well-known band on the West Coast (especially in San Francisco), Big Brother played their first East Coast concert in New York City on February 17, 1968, at the Anderson Theater, 66 Second Avenue. Columbia's marketing department featured Janis Joplin as the star; before that time, some of the band's audience regarded James Gurley as of equal or more importance. In New York the press criticized the band for playing out of tune and for amplifiers set at maximum volume. The Village Voice, while noting that “ears came out ringing” after the Saturday night performance, cited Joplin as ranking in sex appeal with Jim Morrison and Jimi Hendrix, and praised “her belting, groovy style,” mixing Bessie Smith, Aretha Franklin and James Brown. “At times she seemed to be singing harmony with herself.” Big Brother was the first band to play in the legendary Fillmore East, in New York City, on March 8, 1968. The other acts that night were Albert King and Tim Buckley.

=== Cheap Thrills ===
The band's first album for Columbia was due to be recorded during the spring and summer of 1968, and released in August of that year. It was eagerly anticipated after the first LP had been largely ignored. Initially planned as a live album, the band recorded two concerts at Grande Ballroom in Detroit, but the results did not satisfy the producer John Simon nor the manager Albert Grossman.

The live album was scrapped and Columbia decided to re-record most of the songs in the studio ("Down on Me" and "Piece of My Heart", taken from the Grande Ballroom concerts, were later released as part of Joplin's live album In Concert in 1972). However, it was difficult adapting their raw sound and unorthodox work habits with the realities of a professional studio. The progress was slow, and the pressure from Grossman, Columbia, and the press increased. A few of the band members believed that John Simon should not be the producer, believing that he came from a different musical style and did not understand the band's psychedelic, guitar based sound.

The album was initially named Sex, Dope and Cheap Thrills, but Columbia asked them to shorten it to just Cheap Thrills. For the album cover the band was photographed by Richard Avedon but the pictures were not used. Also rejected was a photo of the band naked in a hotel room bed. Dave Getz suggested that the band hire underground comic-book artist R. Crumb whom he knew through a mutual friend. What was originally meant to be the back cover art became the classic cover of the album. For the back cover, Columbia chose a black and white photo of Joplin.

"Ball and Chain" is the only song on the album recorded entirely live, and even though the cover credits assert that the live material was recorded at Bill Graham's Fillmore Auditorium, it was actually taken from a concert in Winterland Ballroom in 1968, the same version that appears on the album Live at Winterland '68, released in 1998. (The performance of "Ball and Chain" as released on the Winterland album features a different opening guitar solo by Gurley, indicating that he had dubbed a different intro for the Cheap Thrills issue.)

The LP was released in August 1968, one year after their debut album, and reached number one on the Billboard charts in its eighth week in October. It held the number one spot for eight (nonconsecutive) weeks, and the single "Piece of My Heart" also became a huge hit. By the end of the year it was one of the most successful albums of 1968. It was certified gold by the R.I.A.A. on October 15 that year for $1 million worth of sales, with subsequent sales pushing the total over a million units. Even though the album was released with only seven songs, the other eight songs which were not included were released on subsequent albums. "Catch Me Daddy" and "Farewell Song" were among their most popular songs. These plus "Magic of Love", a medley of "Amazing Grace" and "Hi-Heel Sneakers", and an outtake of "Harry" first appeared on Farewell Song, a posthumous Joplin release in 1981; they also appeared on the three-CD set Janis in 1993. "It's a Deal" and "Easy Once you Know How" were released in Box of Pearls in 1999. "Flower in The Sun" and "Roadblock" were released on the Cheap Thrills reissue CD as bonus tracks. "Piece of My Heart" would be reissued on a single in the Columbia Hall of Fame oldies series - backed by the title cut from Joplin's first 1969 solo album, I Got Dem Ol' Kozmic Blues Again Mama!.

=== Split with Joplin ===
At the end of the summer of 1968, just after the release of Cheap Thrills, Joplin announced that she was leaving Big Brother in the fall of that year. The official reason given was her desire to go solo and form a soul music band. Andrew also planned to leave the band to join Joplin in her new project. Joplin played with Big Brother on a nationwide tour throughout October and November 1968. It included an October 20 concert at a roller rink in Alexandria, Virginia. Their final concert was in San Francisco on December 1, 1968. It was a benefit for the production company known as the Family Dog whose members included Chet Helms, the band's manager from two years earlier. Three weeks after this benefit concert, Joplin and Andrew played in Memphis for the first time with her new band, later called Kozmic Blues Band.

In 1970, during Joplin’s concert tour with a back-up band, she told Rolling Stone magazine journalist David Dalton and others that four years earlier, Travis Rivers had seduced her and slept with her so she would feel obligated to join Big Brother, and the story was false, according to many Joplin biographers including Myra Friedman.

Joplin’s friends had admired for years the honesty she displayed in conversations with them, and in 1970 they became dismayed when they noticed that she was starting to make up stories about herself to enhance a public image as a sex symbol who was constantly searching for a man to love her.

=== 1969–1972 ===
After Joplin and Sam Andrew left Big Brother, Dave Getz and Peter Albin joined Country Joe and the Fish and toured the U.S. and Europe and played on the Country Joe album Here We Are Again (Vanguard Records 1969). Getz and Albin left Country Joe in May 1969 with the intention of re-forming Big Brother with guitarist David Nelson. They auditioned several singers including Eddie Money, Kathi McDonald and John Herald, but the band finally came back together when Sam Andrew left the Kozmic Blues Band in the fall of 1969 with nearly the same line-up (except Joplin): Albin, Andrew, Getz and Gurley were joined by Nick Gravenites (vocals), Dave Schallock (guitar) and Kathi McDonald (vocals). They released Be a Brother in 1970. Gurley moved to bass guitar while Albin played rhythm, Sam Andrew sang more lead vocals with Kathi McDonald (a white blues singer who had been with the Ike and Tina Turner review), David Schallock (from Freedom Highway and Sons of Champlin) on lead guitar, Dave Getz on drums and occasional keyboards. Nick Gravenites would also produce the album, write and sing on a number of the tracks. They released their last studio album, How Hard It Is, in 1971. They retained the same lineup: Kathi and Sam and Nick on vocals joined by organist Mike Finnigan. The band remained with this line-up until 1972, but they gradually fell apart and disbanded amidst drug use, loss of management, lack of gigs and internal squabbles. They re-united once to play "The Tribal Stomp" in 1978 at the Greek Theatre in Berkeley.

=== 1987–present ===
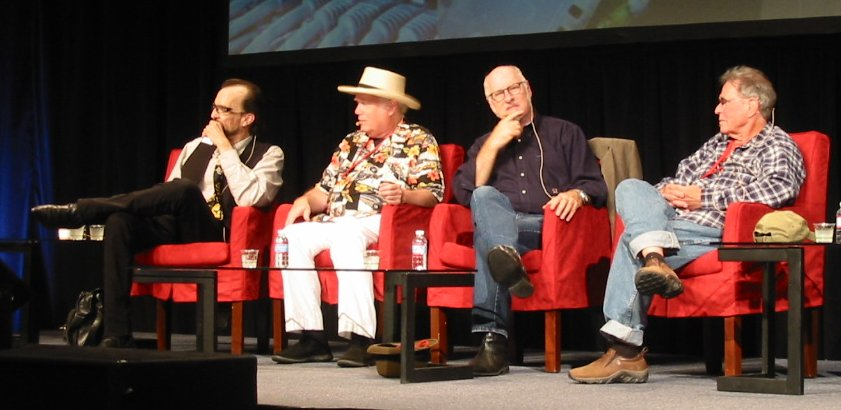
"Legendary Artists: Sounds of San Francisco" at an Audio Engineering Society convention in 2012. Left to right: Mario Cipollina, Albin, Joel Selvin, Country Joe McDonald

The latest incarnation began in 1987 and has been touring part-time ever since with most of its classic line-up, including Sam Andrew, Peter Albin, Dave Getz, and James Gurley. Gurley left in 1997 because he did not support his colleagues' idea to hire a female singer to replace Joplin. He was replaced by Tom Finch. Big Brother did not have a fixed lead singer until 2011; Michel Bastian, Lisa Battle, Halley DeVestern, Lisa Mills, Jane Kitto (Aus), Andra Mitrovich, Kacee Clanton, Sophia Ramos, Mary Bridget Davies, Duffy Bishop, Lana Spence, Chloe Lowery, Jane Myrenget, Lynn Asher, Kate Russo Thompson, Darby Gould, Maria Stanford, Jeri Verdi, and Superfly's Shiho Ochi were among the singers that have played in concerts with them. Cathy Richardson became the band's official lead singer in 2011, with Ben Nieves replacing Finch as guitarist in 2008. Other guitarists performed and toured with Big Brother including Chad Quist, Joel Hoekstra, and even Kate Russo Thompson on electric violin as 2nd guitarist. In 1999 the band released the album Do What You Love with Lisa Battle as the lead singer. The album contains some new versions of songs like "Women is Loser". They recorded the live album Hold Me, with Sophia Ramos on lead vocals and Chad Quist on guitar, in Germany in 2005, and released it in 2006. In 2008 they released the two-CD set The Lost Tapes, with songs recorded at concerts in 1966 and 1967 in San Francisco featuring Janis Joplin as lead singer. Some songs had already been unofficial releases, but there are 12 never-before-released songs.

Former guitarist James Gurley died on December 20, 2009, of a heart attack, just two days before his 70th birthday. Sam Andrew died on February 12, 2015, following complications from open-heart surgery; he had suffered a heart attack ten weeks prior.

In October 2016, the band went to Europe for a short tour in the Netherlands with the following line-up: Dave Getz on drums, Peter Albin on bass, Tom Finch on guitar, Kate Russo on electric violin, keyboards and vocals, and Eileen Humphreys on lead vocals. Venues included the North Sea Jazz Club in Amsterdam, De Bosuil in Weert, Het Paard in The Hague and Luxor Live in Arnhem. "Big Brother And The Holding Co Live In The Lowlands" was released in 2017 on DVD and CD by Marista Records featuring this lineup in Weert.

== Controversy ==
In 2007, following the induction of Cheap Thrills to the Grammy Hall of Fame, former guitar player James Gurley described Big Brother as the most maligned band ever, since they never received appreciation for the arrangements they did and all the engineering tricks he came up with. Gurley also believed that Clive Davis told Joplin to leave the band and record her songs with studio musicians, who could play better. In the documentary Nine Hundred Nights, Peter Albin said that the manager Albert Grossman told Joplin to leave Big Brother and form her own band, with studio musicians, in order to spend less money on recording sessions. Sam Andrew said later that Joplin left due to artistic and financial reasons: Joplin usually asked the band to have some keyboard or horns on at least some songs, but they said, "No! You are going to change the Big Brother sound!" The band was also doing the same songs a lot, sometimes three times a day, so she started feeling trapped. The band was splitting the money in five equal ways, while by leaving she could have all the money and just pay some employees and have a new band.

In 1982, Columbia released the Janis Joplin album Farewell Song. The release displeased Big Brother's living members, since their original instruments were all replaced by studio musicians without consulting the band. James Gurley spoke about that in 1987, before the band's reunion: "It's just a total bullshit record...some producer's dream at CBS."

== Personnel ==
=== Members ===
Current members

- Peter Albin – bass (1965–1968, 1969–1972, 1987–present)
- Dave Getz – drums, piano (1966–1968, 1969–1972, 1987–present)
- Tom Finch – guitar (1997–2008, 2015–present)
- Darby Gould – lead vocals (2015–present)
- David Aguilar – guitar (2018–present)
- Kate Russo Thompson – vocals, electric violin and keyboards (1998, 2003–2008, 2015–present)

Former members

- Sam Andrew – guitar, vocals (1965–1968, 1969–1972, 1987–2015; died 2015)
- James Gurley – guitar (1965–1968, 1969–1972, 1987–1997; died 2009)
- Chuck Jones – drums (1965–1966)
- Janis Joplin – lead vocals (1966–1968; died 1970)
- Nick Gravenites – lead vocals (1969–1972; died 2024)
- Michel Bastian - lead vocals (1987-1996)
- Kathi McDonald – lead vocals (1969–1972; died 2012)
- Dave Schallock – guitar (1969–1972)
- Mike Finnigan – organ, vocals (1971–1972; died 2021)
- Lisa Battle – lead vocals (1997–2005)
- Sophia Ramos – lead vocals (2005–2008)
- Ben Nieves – guitar (2008–2015)
- Cathy Richardson – lead vocals (2011–2015)
- Tommy Odetto – guitar (2015–2018)

=== Lineups ===
1965–1966	1966	1966–1968 (Classic Lineup)	1968–1969
Sam Andrew – guitar, vocals; James Gurley – guitar; Peter Albin – bass; Chuck Jones – drums	Sam Andrew – guitar, vocals; James Gurley – guitar; Peter Albin – bass; Dave Getz – drums, piano	Janis Joplin – lead vocals; Sam Andrew – guitar, vocals; James Gurley – guitar, bass; Peter Albin – bass, guitar; Dave Getz – drums, piano	Disbanded
1969–1971	1971–1972	1972–1987	1987–1997
Nick Gravenites – lead vocals; Kathi McDonald – lead vocals; Sam Andrew – guitar, vocals; James Gurley – bass, guitar; Dave Schallock – guitar; Peter Albin – guitar; Dave Getz – drums, piano	Nick Gravenites – lead vocals; Kathi McDonald – lead vocals; Sam Andrew – guitar, vocals; James Gurley – bass, guitar; Dave Schallock – guitar; Peter Albin – guitar; Dave Getz – drums, piano; Mike Finnigan – organ, vocals	Disbanded	Sam Andrew – guitar, vocals; James Gurley – guitar; Peter Albin – bass; Dave Getz – drums, piano; Michel Bastian - lead vocals; with: Various guest lead singers
1997–2005	2005–2008	2008–2011	2011–2015
Lisa Battle – lead vocals; Sam Andrew – guitar, vocals; Tom Finch – guitar; Peter Albin – bass; Dave Getz – drums, piano	Sophia Ramos – lead vocals; Sam Andrew – guitar, vocals; Chad Quist – guitar; Peter Albin – bass; Dave Getz – drums, piano	Sam Andrew – guitar, vocals; Ben Nieves – guitar; Peter Albin – bass; Dave Getz – drums, piano; with: Various guest lead singers	Cathy Richardson – lead vocals; Sam Andrew – guitar, vocals; Ben Nieves – guitar; Peter Albin – bass; Dave Getz – drums, piano
2015–2018	2018–present
Darby Gould – lead vocals; Tom Finch – guitar, vocals; Tommy Odetto – guitar; Kate Russo Thompson – electric violin, keyboards, vocals; Peter Albin – bass; Dave Getz – drums, piano	Darby Gould – lead vocals; Tom Finch – guitar, vocals; Kate Russo Thompson – electric violin, keyboards, vocals; David Aguilar – guitar; Peter Albin – bass; Dave Getz – drums, piano

== Discography ==
=== Studio albums ===
List of studio albums, with selected details and peak chart positions
Title	Album details	Peak chart positions	
Title	Album details	US	US R&B
Big Brother & the Holding Company	Released: 1967; Label: Mainstream	60	28
Cheap Thrills	Released: 1968; Label: Columbia	1	7
Be a Brother	Released: 1970; Label: Columbia	134	—
How Hard It Is	Released: 1971; Label: Columbia	157	—
Can't Go Home Again	Released: 1997	—	—
Do What You Love	Released: 1999	—	—

=== Live/compilation/etc. albums ===
- Big Brother & the Holding Company: Live in San Francisco 1966 (1966)
- In Concert (Janis Joplin) (1972)
- Cheaper Thrills (1984)
- Joseph's Coat (1986)
- Live at Winterland '68 (1998)
- Hold Me (2006)
- The Lost Tapes (2008)
- Live at the Carousel Ballroom 1968 (2012)
- Sex, Dope & Cheap Thrills – outtakes, etc., from Cheap Thrills sessions (2018, Columbia Legacy)

=== Singles ===
List of singles, with selected peak chart positions
Title	Year	US Hot 100
"Bye, Bye Baby"	1967	118
"Down On Me"	1967	43
"Blindman"	1967	110
"Piece of My Heart"	1968	12
"Coo Coo"	1968	84
"Women Is Losers"	1968	—
"Combination of the Two"	1968	—

== Filmography ==
- Monterey Pop (1968)
- Petulia (1968)
- Janis: The Way She Was (1974)
- Comin' Home (1988)
- Nine Hundred Nights (DVD) Pioneer Entertainment (2004)
- Rockin' at the Red Dog: The Dawn of Psychedelic Rock (2005)
- Hold Me (LIVE in Germany) (DVD) Ryko Distribution (2007)
- Janis Joplin with Big Brother: Ball and Chain (DVD) Charly (2009)

== See also ==
- List of bands from the San Francisco Bay Area
