= Sam Andrew =

American rock musician, singer-songwriter (1941–2015)

Background information
- Born: Sam Houston Andrew III; December 18, 1941; Taft, California, U.S.
- Died: February 12, 2015 (aged 73) San Francisco, California, U.S.
- Genre: Rock
- Occupations: Musician, singer-songwriter
- Instruments: Guitar, vocals, bass
- Years active: 1960s–2015
- Formerly of: Big Brother and the Holding Company; Kozmic Blues Band; Sam Andrew Band
- Website: samandrew.com

Sam Houston Andrew III (December 18, 1941 – February 12, 2015) was an American rock musician, singer, songwriter, composer, artist and founding member and guitarist of Big Brother and the Holding Company. During his career as musician and composer, Andrew had three platinum albums and two hit singles. His songs have been used in numerous major motion picture soundtracks and documentaries.

== Music career ==
Andrew was born in Taft, California. As the son of a military father, Andrew moved a great deal as a child. He developed a skill for music at a very early age. By the time he was seventeen living in Okinawa, he already had his own band, called the "Cool Notes", and his own weekly TV show, an Okinawan version of American Bandstand. His early influences were Chuck Berry, Bo Diddley and Little Richard. He also listened to a great deal of Delta blues.

Shortly after he graduated from high school, his father was transferred to Hamilton Air Force Base in northern California. Andrew started attending classes at the University of San Francisco, and became involved with the San Francisco folk music scene of the early 1960s. After he returned from a two-year stay in Europe, over a year in Paris and almost a year in Germany, Andrew met Peter Albin at 1090 Page Street.

As Big Brother and the Holding Company began to gel, Andrew brought many songs to the band. He was a prolific songwriter all of his life, penning his first tune at the age of six. Of his early compositions, "Call on Me" and "Combination of the Two" have been two of Big Brother's most enduring classic tracks. Until Andrew’s health declined in December 2014, he continued in his original role as the musical director of the band.

Janis Joplin was recruited by band manager Chet Helms to join Big Brother in 1966. When Helms’ friend Travis Rivers traveled from San Francisco to Austin, Texas, to make Joplin an offer, she eagerly told him they should start driving to San Francisco. Rivers insisted that first she must tell her parents face-to-face about her intention, and she did.

When the four Big Brother musicians were interviewed for a documentary decades later, they said it was immediately after they heard her sing for the first time, which was on June 4, that they decided to go along with her. In August, they landed a record contract, but the label known as Mainstream Records delayed their recording sessions and the release of their first album for many months, and upon its release in 1967 it sold poorly. The band’s second album was released by Columbia Records in August 1968 and reached number one on the Billboard album chart. It remained in the top ten for a long time after newspapers and magazines reported that Joplin was leaving the band to perform solo with a back-up band.

Andrew and original bandmate James Gurley played searing psychedelic guitar. In February 1997, Guitar Player magazine listed Andrew's and Gurley's work on "Summertime" as one of the top ten psychedelic solos in music history. On September 11, 2001, Andrew was to be presented with a High Times magazine Lifetime Achievement award. That day his flight to New York City was canceled, and he received the award the next year.

In December 1968, Andrew and Joplin, following a concert tour that they were legally obligated to finish, both left Big Brother and the Holding Company to form the Kozmic Blues Band. After about nine months and one album, I Got Dem Ol' Kozmic Blues Again Mama!, Andrew returned to Big Brother.

After Big Brother stopped performing in 1972, Sam Andrew moved to New York City, where he studied harmony and counterpoint at the New School for Social Research and composition at Mannes School of Music. He also scored several films in the US and Canada, wrote two string quartets and a symphony. He remained in New York City for eight years before returning to San Francisco, where he began playing clarinet and saxophone. Big Brother and the Holding Company reunited in 1987.

During the 1990s, in addition to touring with Big Brother, Andrew was involved with his solo project, The Sam Andrew Band. It toured across North America, and the spoken word quartet Theatre of Light, that besides Andrew, featured The Vagabond Poet, Tony Seldin, keyboardist Tom Constanten and harpist-pianist Elise Piliwale. He also played several dates with the band Moby Grape and more recently with the band the Former Members featuring Greg Douglass, Roy Blumenfeld, David Bennett Cohen and Bruce Barthol.

On October 16, 1992, Andrew made a personal appearance at the Pike St. Cinema, playing guitar, singing, and telling tales.

On February 20, 1993, he performed with a group including Tom McFarland, Fat James and Guitar Slim in Occidental Park, in Seattle.

Andrew was the music director of the musical Love, Janis, based on the life of Janis Joplin, written and directed by Randal Myler and based on the book by Laura Joplin of the same name. He also performed at the 40th Anniversary of Woodstock Concert on August 15, 2009, at Bethel Woods, New York.

== Personal life and death ==
Andrew lived in northern California with his wife Elise Piliwale. He had one daughter, Mari Andrew, from his marriage to Suzanne Thorson. He died in San Francisco, California, on February 12, 2015, following complications from open-heart surgery due to a heart attack suffered ten weeks prior.
