= James Gurley =

American musician (1939–2009)

- Born: James Martin Gurley; December 22, 1939; Detroit, Michigan, U.S.
- Origin: San Francisco, California, U.S.
- Died: December 20, 2009 (aged 69) Palm Desert, California, U.S.
- Genres: Psychedelic rock; acid rock; blues rock; new wave
- Occupation: Musician
- Instruments: Guitar; bass guitar; drums
- Years active: 1962–1972; 1978–2009
- Labels: Mainstream; Columbia

James Martin Gurley (December 22, 1939 – December 20, 2009) was an American musician. He is best known as the principal lead guitarist of Big Brother and the Holding Company, a psychedelic/acid rock band from San Francisco which was fronted by singer Janis Joplin from 1966 to 1968.

== Early life ==
Gurley was born in Detroit, Michigan. He taught himself to play the guitar when he was nineteen. He spent four years at Detroit's Catholic Brothers of the Holy Cross, studying to be a priest.

== 1960s–1970s ==
He and his wife Nancy moved to San Francisco in 1962. He played with JP Pickens and the Progressive Bluegrass Boys for a time. He joined Big Brother and the Holding Company in 1965. His fearlessly wild guitar playing made the band's reputation for "far-out" psychedelic experimentation. He said it developed from his admiration of John Coltrane's barrier-breaking saxophone solos.

With Joplin's departure, Big Brother and the Holding Company briefly disbanded in 1968, but a new lineup including Gurley and the other three original members (Sam Andrew, Peter Albin, and Dave Getz) reunited from 1969 to 1972.

In 1969, Nancy Gurley died of a heroin overdose. Gurley was charged with murder for injecting the drugs, and spent two years fighting the charges before being sentenced to probation. He remarried and had another child in 1972.

== Later years ==
In 1978 Gurley started a band with his son Hongo on drums, featuring then girlfriend "Red" Robin Reed on rhythm guitar/lead vocals and Jim Holt ("Jerome") on lead psychedelic rock saxophone and vocals. As he did in later incarnations of Big Brother and the Holding Company, James added his distinctive bass lines and vocals; he also engineered and mixed the band's recordings. The band became Red Robin and the Worms, a psychedelic-edged early new wave, punk and reggae-flavored group, playing all originals. Later Dennis Franklin joined as lead guitar, contributing new songs and singing some lead vocals. Dennis later left to pursue a solo career. After auditioning guitarists, Mitch McKendry a.k.a. Mitch Master was asked to join and take over lead guitar.

Big Brother and the Holding Company again reunited in 1987 with original members Gurley, Sam Andrew, Peter Albin, and Dave Getz.

In May 1997, Gurley switched to a solo career. His first CD entitled Saint James – Pipe Dreams included two members of the Worms, Mitch McKendry and Hongo Gurley. St James – Pipe Dreams was released in January 2000.

After finding a long-forgotten live 4-track recording of Janis Joplin playing acoustic guitar and singing in a Bay Area venue, Gurley released it as a CD This is Janis Joplin.

Gurley, with fellow members of Big Brother, played at the induction ceremony for Joplin at the Rock and Roll Hall of Fame in 1995. He reunited with the band in the Bay Area at a concert for Chet Helms.

Gurley recorded and appeared with new age drummer and percussionist Muruga Booker for many years. They recorded the album Big Huge in October 2009, two months prior to Gurley's death.

Gurley died on December 20, 2009, from a heart attack at his home in Palm Desert, California, two days before his 70th birthday. His wife, Margaret, survived him, as did his two sons, Django and Hongo.
