= Speckled Bird =

Speckled Bird may refer to:

- A Speckled Bird, novel by Augusta Jane Evans published in 1902
- Speckled Bird (album), The Choir album
- The Speckled Bird, a semi-autobiographical novel by William Butler Yeats, written in four versions and published posthumously by William H. O'donnell in 1976 and 2003

== See also ==
- The Great Speckled Bird (disambiguation)
- "The Great Speckled Bird" (song), a southern hymn
- The Great Speckled Bird (newspaper), an Atlanta underground newspaper
- Great Speckled Bird (band), a Canadian country-rock group
  - Great Speckled Bird (album), their eponymous album
