= Sound Emporium Studios =

Music recording studio in Nashville, Tennessee, US

- Formerly: Jack Clement Recording Studios
- Industry: Recording studio
- Founded: Nashville, Tennessee, U.S. (1969)
- Founder: Jack Clement
- Headquarters: Nashville, Tennessee, U.S.
- Number of locations: 1
- Website: soundemporiumstudios.com

Sound Emporium is a music recording studio located at 3100 Belmont Boulevard in Nashville, Tennessee. Originally founded by Jack Clement in 1969 as the Jack Clement Recording Studios, the studio changed ownership and was renamed Sound Emporium in 1979. The studios have been the site of numerous notable recordings by artists including Merle Haggard, Don Williams, Kenny Rogers, Keith Whitley, R.E.M., Trisha Yearwood, Alan Jackson, Taylor Swift, Robert Plant and Alison Krauss, Willie Nelson, Kacey Musgraves, Cole Swindell, Yo-Yo Ma, T Bone Burnett, Alabama Shakes, and others.

== History ==
=== Jack Clement Recording Studios (1969–1979) ===
Producer and songwriter "Cowboy" Jack Clement built the studio in 1969 at 3102 Belmont Boulevard in Nashville with the help of engineer Charlie Tallent, who had been working at Owen Bradley's Bradley's Barn studio. The 16-track studio (later referred to as Studio A) touted a 35x45 foot live room with 22 foot ceiling. Shortly after building the studio, Clement acquired a house on an adjacent lot and repurposed it into an additional studio (Studio B). One of the first projects recorded at the studio was the Todd Rundgren-produced self-titled album by the Ian & Sylvia group Great Speckled Bird. In February 1970, the studio gained notoriety when Ray Stevens recorded the hit Grammy Award-winning song "Everything Is Beautiful" there. Other artists recording at the studio in its early years included Donna Fargo, Merle Haggard, and Don Williams.

In 1974, Clement sold the studios to producer Larry Butler and Al Mifflin.

=== Sound Emporium (1979–present) ===
In 1979, Butler took over ownership and changed the name of the studios to Sound Emporium in May 1980. That year, more than 11% of the Hot Country Singles and 18% of the Hot Country LPs were recorded at the studio. The same year, Roy Clark bought into the studio to become a co-owner.

Butler utilized the studio to produce eight of Kenny Rogers' studio albums between 1977 and 1980, as well as Rogers' duets with Dottie West and West's successful solo albums of the late 1970s and early 1980s.

R.E.M. recorded their 1987 album, Document at the studio. Garth Fundis often worked at Sound Emporium in the 1980s, producing artists including Don Williams, Keith Whitley, and New Grass Revival.

By 1992, studio was fully owned by Clark, who sold it to Fundis that year. Fundis joined the two buildings and added a lobby and offices.

In the 1990s, Trisha Yearwood recorded her first six studio albums at Sound Emporium, and in 1996, Yo-Yo Ma, Edgar Meyer, and Mark O'Connor recorded Appalachia Waltz at the studio.

Beginning in the late 1990s, T Bone Burnett produced three Grammy award-winning soundtrack albums at Sound Emporium: O Brother, Where Art Thou? (soundtrack) (1999), Cold Mountain (soundtrack) (2003), and Walk the Line (soundtrack) (2005). Other artists recording at the studio in the 1990s included Alan Jackson.

Artists recording at the studio in the 2000s included Sugarland, Kenny Chesney, Sam Bush, and Elvis Costello, and portions of Taylor Swift's first four studio albums were recorded at Sound Emporium. In 2005, Juanita Copeland was appointed manager of the studios.In 2007, Robert Plant and Alison Krauss recorded portions of their award-winning collaborative album Raising Sand at Sound Emporium, and returned to the studio for its 2020 follow-up Raise the Roof.

In 2011, Fundis sold the studios to businessman and philanthropist George Shinn, and in 2013, the studio requested and was granted a historical marker for Jack Clement Recording Studios from the Historical Commission of Metropolitan Nashville and Davidson County.

Artists recording at Sound Emporium in the 2010s included Willie Nelson, Jamey Johnson, Don Henley, Cage the Elephant, Josh Ritter, Zac Brown Band, Cyndi Lauper, Chris Isaak, Jason Isbell, Cole Swindell, Nefesh Mountain, Jimmy Buffett, St. Paul and The Broken Bones, Pop Evil, Little Big Town, Kaleo, Lake Street Dive, Kesha, and Cage the Elephant. Alabama Shakes' multiple Grammy award-winning album Sound & Color (2015) was recorded in Sound Emporium's Studio A.

In 2017, George Shinn gifted the studio to Lipscomb University, which committed to preserving the history of the studio and allowing it to remain business as usual. The university also established The George Shinn College of Entertainment & the Arts.
