= Amos Garrett =

American-Canadian blues and rock musician

- Born: November 26, 1941 (age 84); Detroit, Michigan, United States
- Origin: Toronto, Ontario, Canada
- Genres: Blues, jazz, blues rock, country rock
- Occupations: Musician, singer, session musician, guitarist, composer
- Instruments: Guitar, electric sitar, vocals, trombone, bass guitar, mandolin, piano
- Years active: 1963 – present
- Labels: Stony Plain, Bearsville
- Website: melmusic.com/amos_garrett/index.html

Amos Garrett (born November 26, 1941) is an American-Canadian blues and blues-rock musician, guitarist, singer, composer, and musical arranger. He has written instructional books about music and guitar. Garrett holds dual citizenship and was raised in Toronto and Montreal. He is best known for his guitar solos on Maria Muldaur's recording "Midnight at the Oasis", and on Paul Butterfield's Better Days recording of "Please Send Me Someone to Love." He has written books about music, such as Amos Garrett—Stringbending: A Master Class.

Over the course of his career, Garrett has recorded with more than 150 artists, ranging from Stevie Wonder, Todd Rundgren, and Pearls Before Swine to Emmylou Harris, Rodney Crowell, Bonnie Raitt, and Martin Mull. He can be heard on Anne Murray's chart-topping rendition of "Snowbird". The guitarist Jimmy Page, of Led Zeppelin, stated Garrett was one of his favorite American guitar players in a 1975 Rolling Stone interview.

== Biography ==
=== Early years ===
Garrett was born in Detroit, Michigan, on November 26, 1941. When he was five, his family moved to Toronto, Ontario. He studied piano and trombone at the Royal Conservatory of Music of Toronto.

At twelve, he relocated to Montreal, Quebec, Canada, where he began playing guitar at fourteen. There, at the Esquire Club, he would learn while watching performers such as Ben E. King, T-Bone Walker, Fats Domino, and B. B. King. After studying English literature at Wabash College, he opted to pursue a career in music and moved back to Toronto in 1962.

=== Career: 1960s to 1970s ===
Garrett's first professional gig was accompanying Mike Settle at Carnegie Hall in the winter of 1963. Settle was the opening act for Vaughn Meader. From 1964 to 1967, Garrett played in the Toronto jug/string band, the Dirty Shames, which included Chick Roberts, Jim McCarthy, and Carol Robinson. It was during this period that Garrett and Roberts took John Hammond, Jr., to see Levon and the Hawks for the first time. The Hawks would later be recommended by Hammond to Bob Dylan.

In 1968, he played guitar on Geoff Muldaur and Maria's album Pottery Pie. In 1968, Garrett began a two-year stint of touring and recording with the Canadian duo Ian & Sylvia, which led to becoming a founding member of Great Speckled Bird. This band is featured in the film Festival Express, playing the song "C.C. Rider" with members of the Grateful Dead and Delaney Bramlett in 1970. As a special feature on the DVD release of the film, Great Speckled Bird is shown playing the Dylan-Manuel song "Tears of Rage".

Garrett moved to Woodstock, New York, in 1970 to play in Maria and Geoff Muldaur's band. Based there, he performed and recorded with artists that were part of Albert Grossman's Bearsville stable, such as Bobby Charles, Todd Rundgren, and Jesse Winchester, and as a member of Paul Butterfield's Better Days. Garrett was also a member of Hungry Chuck, another Bearsville act, which was formed of ex–Great Speckled Bird members. They released an eponymous album in 1972. Garrett also played trombone on two songs for Jerry Garcia's second solo album, Garcia, released in 1974. He played the guitar solo on Maria Muldaur's hit single "Midnight at the Oasis", which reached number 6 on the Billboard chart in June 1974.

After living in Boston for two years, Garrett moved to San Francisco in 1976 to pursue session work. There, he continued as member and bandleader of Maria Muldaur's group until 1978, toured the R&B circuits of North America, and recorded with more than 150 artists.

=== Frontman ===
"I wanted to sing. I loved to sing, but there was no way I could do so being a hired gun for bands."—Amos Garrett

In 1978, Garrett decided to pursue fronting his own project, left Muldaur's group, and began releasing material through Stony Plain Records, a label based in Edmonton, Alberta, Canada. His first solo album was 1980's Go Cat Go, which was followed by Amosbehavin in 1982. He formed his backup band, the Eh Team, around this time.

Garrett shared performing and recording duties and co-wrote two songs for the 1988 album The Return of the Formerly Brothers with the late Doug Sahm and the pianist Gene Taylor. Queen Ida sat in on accordion. The album was awarded the inaugural 1989, Juno Award for Best Roots & Traditional Album. A follow-up live album, Live in Japan, was recorded in 1990 from performances by Garrett, Sahm and Taylor in clubs and concert halls in Tokyo, Osaka and Kyoto.

In 1989, Garrett relocated to Turner Valley, Alberta. That year also brought the album I Make My Home in My Shoes, which paid tribute to his boyhood days, especially on "Stanley Street", a song written in recollection of the Esquire Club. Garrett began his intermittent role as bandleader and member of the Edmonton Folk Music Festival's Festival House Band in 1990, reprising it from 1994 to 2000, from 2002 to 2006, and from 2008 to 2012. With Garrett, the band has backed such acts as Richard Thompson, Solomon Burke, Ruth Brown, Rick Danko, Jay McShann, Johnnie Johnson, and Rosco Gordon. Third Man In, released in 1992, was a collection of covers and originals. Garrett's covers were written by Bobby Charles and Percy Mayfield.

Garrett was presented with an Alberta Music Industry Award in 1994. The album Off the Floor Live followed in 1996. It was recorded live with the Eh Team at the Sidetrack Club in Edmonton.

The Cold Club was a collaboration with Oscar Lopez, David Wilkie, Karl Roth and Ron Casat. They released an eponymous record in 1996. Maria Muldaur, Mike Lent and Teddy Borowiecki guested on the album. Garrett released Amos Garrett's Acoustic Album in 2004. It features tracks written by Lead Belly and Hoagy Carmichael, among others. It was nominated for a 2005 Juno Award. This was followed by the 2008 release Get Way Back: A Tribute to Percy Mayfield, which was also nominated for a Juno Award for Blues Album of the year. Garrett was living in High River, Alberta, in 2008.

On November 6, 2011, Garrett conducted a clinic and then performed as part of the Sleepwalk Guitar Festival in Toronto. The festival was presented by Six Shooter Records and curated by Luke Doucet.

== Other works ==
Garrett has authored instructional books about music and guitar. He has also released instructional albums and videos.

Garrett is known as "The Fishin' Musician". He enjoys fishing and hopes to one day catch an Atlantic Salmon of twenty pounds or more.

== Discography ==
=== Selected long-plays ===
Year	Album	Album Artist	Label
1969	This Way Is My Way	Anne Murray	Capitol
1970	Great Speckled Bird	Great Speckled Bird	Ampex
1972	Hungry Chuck	Hungry Chuck	Bearsville
1973	Maria Muldaur	Maria Muldaur	Reprise
1973	Paul Butterfield's Better Days	Paul Butterfield's Better Days	Bearsville
1973	It All Comes Back	Paul Butterfield's Better Days	Bearsville
1978	Geoff Muldaur & Amos Garrett	Geoff Muldaur & Amos Garrett	Stony Plain
1980	Go Cat Go	Amos Garrett	Stony Plain
1981	Amosbehavin'	Amos Garrett	Stony Plain
1987	The Return of the Formerly Brothers	Amos Garrett, Doug Sahm, Gene Taylor Band	Stony Plain
1989	I Make My Home in My Shoes	Amos Garrett	Stony Plain
1990	Live in Japan	Amos Garrett, Doug Sahm, Gene Taylor Band	Stony Plain
1992	Third Man In	Amos Garrett	Stony Plain
1996	Off the Floor Live!	Amos Garrett	Stony Plain
1996	The Cold Club	The Cold Club	Cold Club
2005	Acoustic Album	Amos Garrett	Stony Plain
2008	Get Way Back: A Tribute to Percy Mayfield	Amos Garrett	Stony Plain

=== Compilation inclusions ===
Year	Song	Album	Label	Note
1991	"Bert's Boogie"	Saturday Night Blues	Stony Plain/CBC	Composed by Amos Garrett
1991	"Home in My Shoes"	15 Years of Stony Plain	Stony Plain	
1991	"Sure Is a Good Thing"	15 Years of Stony Plain	Stony Plain	With Doug Sahm and Gene Taylor
1991	"Talk to Me"	15 Years of Stony Plain	Stony Plain	With Doug Sahm and Gene Taylor
1996	"Long, Long Time to Get Old"	20 Years of Stony Plain	Stony Plain	With Great Speckled Bird; Composed by Ian Tyson
1996	"Small Town Talk"	20 Years of Stony Plain	Stony Plain	With Maria Muldaur; Composed by Bobby Charles
1996	"Wrong Lake to Catch a Fish"	20 Years of Stony Plain	Stony Plain	Composed by Chuck Willis
1997	"Walkin' Blues"	Absolute Blues Vol. 1	Stony Plain	
1997	"Sure Is a Good Thing"	Absolute Blues Vol. 2	Stony Plain	With Doug Sahm and Gene Taylor
2001	"Bert's Boogie"	25 Years of Stony Plain	Stony Plain	Composed by Amos Garrett
2006	"Sam's Song (The Happy Tune)"	30 Years of Stony Plain	Stony Plain	Composed by Jack Elliott and Lew Quadling
2006	"Poor Fool Like Me"	30 Years of Stony Plain	Stony Plain	Video performance
2007	"Some Kind of Fool"	The Gift: A Tribute to Ian Tyson	Stony Plain	Composed by Ian Tyson
2011	"Get Way Back"	35 Years of Stony Plain	Stony Plain	Composed by Percy Mayfield
2011	"Teardrops on Your Letter"	35 Years of Stony Plain	Stony Plain	With Doug Sahm and Gene Taylor

== Bibliography ==
- Garrett, Amos (2008). Stringbending: A Master Class.

== See also ==
- Blues
- Jazz
- Twelve Bar Blues
- Jug band
- Great Speckled Bird
