= The Revols =

Canadian rock band (1957–1962)

- Also known as: The Rockin' Revols
- Origin: Stratford, Ontario, Canada
- Genre: Rock and roll
- Years active: 1957–1962
- Spinoffs: The Fab Four
- Past members: Richard Manuel; John Till; Ken Kalmusky; Doug Rhodes; Jim Winkler; Garth Picot

The Revols was a Canadian band from Stratford, Ontario, Canada, formed in 1957, with Richard Manuel on piano and vocals, John Till on guitar, Ken Kalmusky on bass, Doug Rhodes on vocals and Jim Winkler on drums. Fourteen- and fifteen-year-old children at the time, they were taken under the wing of Ronnie Hawkins, and, together and individually, they made music history in the years to come.

== Early career ==
The band started in 1957, in Kalmusky's parents' basement, on Queen St. in Stratford. They performed the very first songs Manuel wrote, and were invited into the studio to record "My Eternal Love", Manuel's first original song.

As the Revols gained popularity in the Ontario area, one of their first gigs was opening for Hawkins in Port Dover, Ontario. According to Levon Helm's autobiography, This Wheel's on Fire (p. 87), the next time Hawkins came to Stratford, the Revols were on the bill, but this time they followed Hawkins.

When the Revols came on, Richard sang Ray Charles's "Georgia on My Mind" and brought down the house. That did it, as far as the Hawk was concerned. Rather than compete with the Revols, he hired 'em.

— Levon Helm, This Wheel's on Fire

Till, 15 at the time, was reluctant to quit school and was replaced by Garth Picot, of Goderich, Ontario. David "Dave Mickie" Marsden, another Stratford native, joined as the band's manager. The Revols, working for Hawkins, went to Fayetteville, Arkansas, and played a house gig at Hawkins's club.

== The Fab Four ==
By the end of 1961, the Revols returned to Stratford. Manuel remained with Hawkins until 1964, when Hawkins's backing group, the Hawks (Manuel along with Rick Danko, Levon Helm, Garth Hudson, and Robbie Robertson), left him and formed Levon and the Hawks, later known as the Band. Kalmusky reunited with Till to form the Fab Four—the original Fab Four—at the top of 1962.

The Fab Four were the house band on the weekly television show "Mickie A Go Go" from the Hamilton Ontario station CHCH-TV. The host of the show was David "Dave Mickie" Marsden. On April 25, 1965, when they opened for the Rolling Stones at Maple Leaf Gardens in Toronto, the Toronto Star ran an advertisement with the Fab Four's picture and the words "not the Rolling Stones". Kalmusky stated in an interview with Stratford's Beacon Herald, "They thought we were the Beatles, girls were diving at the car, piling on, as we were driving out of the stadium". In fact, the picture in the Toronto Star did look a whole lot like the Beatles. It has been speculated that the Beatles' nickname became "The Fab Four" as a result of this event. Some authors, and articles, over the last few decades, have cited this story, referencing the parallels, stating "Could 5 boys from Stratford, Ontario really influence the nickname of the Beatles?"

By 1966, Till and Kalmusky paralleled the same move Manuel had made after their trip to Arkansas, leaving the Revols, the Fab Four, and Stratford behind, to be full-time members of Hawkins's band.

Hawkins's band was famously "picked clean" by Albert Grossman, manager for Janis Joplin, Bob Dylan, and Ian & Sylvia. The first of the former Revols to be plucked out by Grossman was Kalmusky, who subsequently played bass with Ian & Sylvia's group, Great Speckled Bird; Todd Rundgren; Jerry Reed; and others. Then, in 1969, the Summer of Love, Till joined Janis Joplin's Kozmic Blues Band, and in 1970 he stayed on to become a member of what became Joplin's last band, the Full Tilt Boogie Band, and recorded the album Pearl, her last record. Two of the original Revols, Manuel and Till, performed at the Woodstock Festival in August 1969, Manuel with the Band and Till with Janis Joplin's Kozmic Blues Band.

== Reunion ==
On November 2, 1985, the Revols - Kalmusky, Manuel, Rhodes, Till and Picot, joined by drummer Danny Brubeck in place of Winkler - reunited at the Stratford Shakespearean Festival Theatre as the Revols, opening for The Band at two sold-out performances billed as "The Band/Revols Reunion Shows". Not long after that, Rhodes, Till, Kalmusky, Levon Helm, and Donald "Philbert" Manuel were seen on the cover of People magazine, carrying Richard Manuel's casket out of the funeral service after his death on March 4, 1986.

== Later developments ==
Two of the original Revols, Till (with Joplin) and Manuel (with the Band), are shown in the 2004 film, Festival Express.

Recently, the Revols' 1958 reel-to-reel recording of "Eternal Love", the first original song ever written by Manuel, was taken to famous Toronto engineer and producer Peter J. Moore (Bruce Cockburn, Cowboy Junkies), where it was re-mastered. It is slated to be released on Capitol Records' forthcoming box set Levon and the Hawks: The early years.

The Revols have been noted in People magazine and have been written about by Levon Helm, in his autobiography, This Wheel's on Fire; Nicholas Jennings, in Before the Gold Rush; and Barney Hoskyns, in Across the Great Divide.

On August 4, 2008, the City Of Stratford dedicated a band shell in Upper Queen's Park to the Revols. A plaque that bears the band's name and the names of its Stratford residents, Ken Kalmusky, Richard Manuel, John Till, Doug Rhodes, Jimmy Winkler, Garth Picot, and David "Dave Mickie" Marsden, was unveiled at 12:30 p.m. After the ceremony was a concert by Plum Loco (Kalmusky and Till's band) followed by Ronnie Hawkins.

== Photo gallery ==
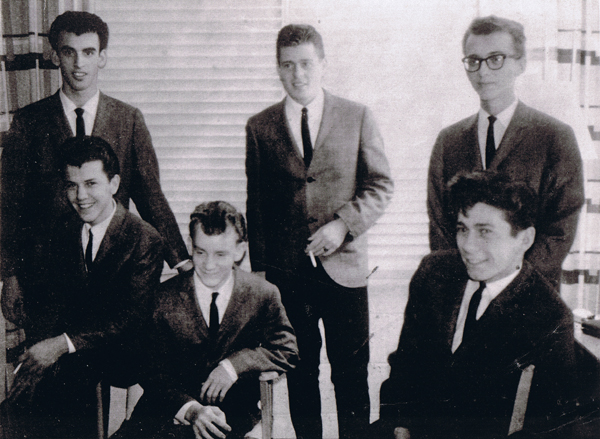
The Revols in 1957

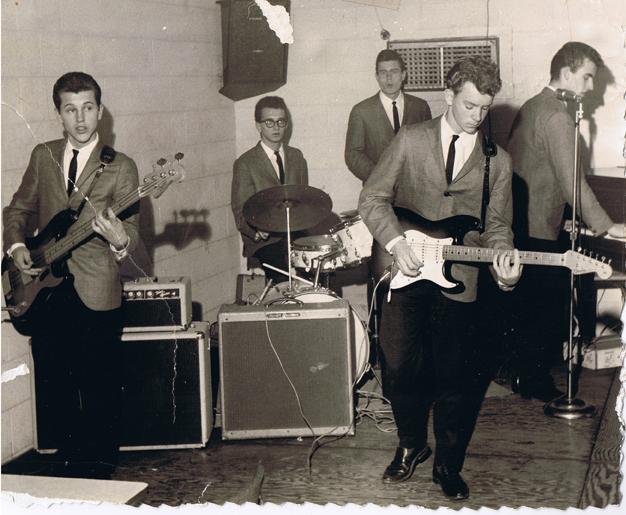
The Revols in 1958

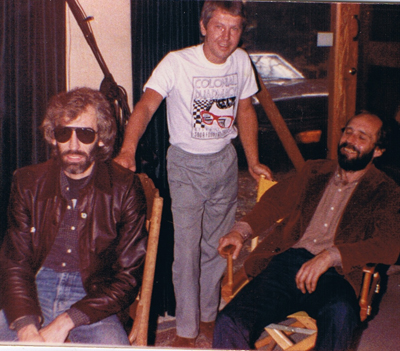
Manuel, Kalmusky, and Till at the Band's studio in Woodstock, New York, 1984

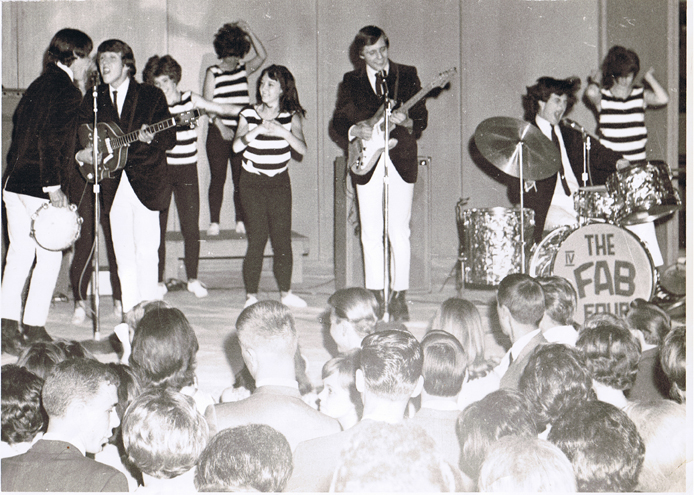
The Fab Four TV Show

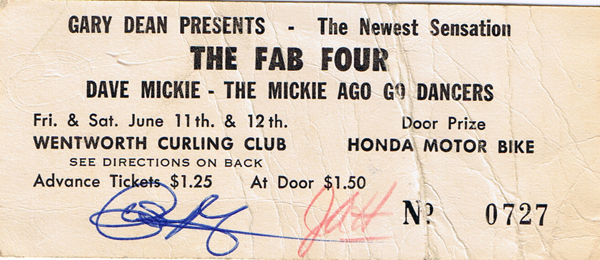
Fab Four concert ticket
