= David Marsden =

Canadian radio broadcaster (1941–2026)

- Born: David Charles Marsden; 2 March 1941; Toronto, Ontario, Canada
- Died: 25 September 2026 (aged 85)
- Other names: David Charles Michie; Dave Mickie
- Occupations: Radio broadcaster, program director
- Years active: 1960s–2026
- Known for: CFNY-FM; CHUM-FM; CHOM-FM

David Charles Marsden (2 March 1941 – 25 September 2026) was a Canadian radio broadcaster and program director. Initially broadcasting under the name Dave Mickie, he became a prominent Toronto disc jockey during the 1960s and was noted for his rapid-fire on-air style, which was discussed by media theorist Marshall McLuhan. He later adopted his birth name and a more relaxed free-form style, working at CHOM-FM in Montreal and CHUM-FM in Toronto during the late 1960s and 1970s.

Marsden became best known for his work at CFNY-FM in Brampton, Ontario, where he became program director in 1979. Under Marsden, CFNY developed its "Spirit of Radio" identity and became an influential outlet for new wave, alternative rock and independent music in Canada. He remained with the station until 1988.

== Early life and career ==
Marsden was born in Toronto, Ontario on 2 March 1941, and was raised by a foster family in Stratford, Ontario, as David Michie (pronounced Mickey). As a teenager, he organized dances and became manager of the Stratford rock band The Revols, whose members included Richard Manuel, Ken Kalmusky and John Till.

He began his radio career at CFCO in Chatham, Ontario, followed by a brief stint at CHLO in St. Thomas, Ontario. He later joined CKEY in Toronto, broadcasting as Dave Mickie. At CKEY he was described by the Toronto Star as "the most controversial thing on Toronto radio".

Marsden appeared on CBC Television's Music Hop and hosted Mickie A Go Go on CHCH-TV. His energetic broadcasting style attracted the attention of Marshall McLuhan, who discussed Mickie's radio delivery in Understanding Media: The Extensions of Man.

By late 1966, he had dropped the Dave Mickie persona and was broadcasting under his birth name, David Marsden. He moved to Montreal, where he worked at CKGM before moving to its FM sister station, later known as CHOM-FM. At CHOM he became associated with the station's transition toward progressive rock programming.

He subsequently returned to Toronto and joined CHUM-FM, where he worked as a free-form disc jockey. He left the station in 1975, later joining CHIC-FM shortly before it became CFNY-FM.

== Pink Floyd and The Dark Side of the Moon ==
While at CHUM-FM in 1973, Marsden helped persuade Toronto concert promoters to book Pink Floyd for a concert at Maple Leaf Gardens. He also played an advance copy of the band's album The Dark Side of the Moon in its entirety on his program, several days before a planned promotional premiere of the album.

== CFNY and "The Spirit of Radio" ==
Marsden joined Brampton's CFNY-FM in 1977 and became its program director in 1979. The station developed a free-form format that mixed new wave, punk, alternative music and Canadian artists with music largely absent from mainstream commercial radio. Under the slogan "The Spirit of Radio", CFNY became an influential outlet for emerging Canadian and international artists during the 1980s.

The station's programming philosophy inspired Rush's 1980 song "The Spirit of Radio". Marsden also helped bring CFNY's U-Know Awards to national television in cooperation with CBC, where they became the CASBY Awards.

In 1985, Marsden judged episodes of CBC Television's battle-of-the-bands competition Rock Wars. He was also Canada's radio voice for the international broadcast of Live Aid that year.

In 1987, Marsden and CFNY general manager Bill Hutton hired Don Berns as program director. Marsden continued as director of operations and executive producer of the CASBY Awards before leaving CFNY in 1988.

== Later career ==
After leaving CFNY, Marsden moved to Vancouver, where he produced the CBC television program Pilot One. He later brought a version of the "Spirit of Radio" format to Vancouver station CKST-AM, where he worked for three years during the early 1990s.

Marsden returned to Toronto and became involved with Iceberg Media in 1999, helping launch an early Canadian online radio service.

=== The Marsden Theatre ===
In 2003, Marsden began hosting The David Marsden Radio Program, also known as The Marsden Theatre, on Oshawa, Ontario radio station CKGE-FM (94.9 The Rock). The free-form program later aired on Saturday and Sunday nights and continued until December 2014.

=== NYTheSpirit.com ===
Marsden and his business partner Igor Loukine created the subscription-based internet radio station NYTheSpirit.com, which launched in September 2014. The service was conceived as a continuation of the free-form approach associated with Marsden's years at CFNY.

After leaving CKGE, Marsden hosted programs on NYTheSpirit, including The Marsden Theatre, and continued broadcasting through 2026. Following his death, NYTheSpirit announced that it would continue operating and maintaining the programming approach he had established.

== Personal life and death ==
Marsden was openly gay and also worked as a club DJ at gay club nights billed as "The Mars Bar".

Marsden died at age 85 on 25 September 2026, from injuries related to a fall. His death was announced by NYTheSpirit on 28 September.

== Legacy ==
Marsden was inducted into the Canadian Association of Broadcasters' Hall of Fame and was one of two Canadians featured in the "Dear Mr. DJ" exhibit at the Rock and Roll Hall of Fame.

He appeared in Roger King's 2015 documentary about radio disc jockeys, I Am What I Play, and was featured in the documentary CFNY: The Spirit of Radio, directed by Matt Schichter.

An animated representation of Marsden at the CFNY control board appeared in the 2020 animated music video for Rush's "The Spirit of Radio".
