= The Great Speckled Bird =

The Great Speckled Bird may refer to:

- "The Great Speckled Bird" (song), a southern hymn
- The Great Speckled Bird (newspaper), an Atlanta underground newspaper
- Great Speckled Bird (band), a Canadian country-rock group
  - Great Speckled Bird (album), their eponymous album
- Speckled Bird (The Choir album), a 1994 album from the Christian alternative rock band
