= Kalmusky =

Kalmusky is a surname. Notable people with the surname include:

- David Kalmusky, American record producer, mixer, songwriter, and guitarist
- Ken Kalmusky (1945–2005), Canadian bassist
