= Four Strong Winds =

Ian Tyson song, written in 1962

Single by Ian & Sylvia

from the album Four Strong Winds
- B-side: "C. C. Rider"
- Written: 1961
- Released: September 1963
- Genre: Folk
- Length: 3:24; 2:35 (single)
- Label: Vanguard
- Songwriter: Ian Tyson

Ian & Sylvia singles chronology
"Four Strong Winds" (1963)	"You Were on My Mind" (1964)

"Four Strong Winds" is a song written in 1961 by Ian Tyson and recorded by Canadian folk duo Ian & Sylvia on their 1963 album Four Strong Winds. Tyson has stated that he wrote the song in about 20 minutes in the New York apartment of his manager at the time Albert Grossman. Tyson said that he was inspired to write it after hearing Bob Dylan sing.

"Four Strong Winds" is a significant composition of the early 1960s folk revival, and has been recorded by numerous artists, including Bobby Bare, whose 1964 rendition was a hit on the U.S. country chart, and Neil Young, who has performed the song frequently throughout his career.

The song is a melancholy reflection on a failing romantic relationship. The singer expresses a desire for a possible reunion in a new place in the future ("You could meet me if I sent you down the fare") but acknowledges the likelihood that the relationship is over ("But our good times are all gone/And I'm bound for moving on ...").

The song has a clear Canadian context and subtext, including an explicit mention of the province Alberta as well as references to long, cold winters. In 2005, CBC Radio One listeners chose it as the greatest Canadian song of all time on the program 50 Tracks: The Canadian Version. It is considered the unofficial anthem of Alberta.

== Composition and initial recordings ==
"Four Strong Winds" was the first song Ian Tyson wrote; before it, he, as well as the duo Ian & Sylvia, had played only covers. In the autumn of 1962, Tyson encountered Bob Dylan, whom Tyson recalled as "this kind of little grubby kid", at the Greenwich Village bar Kettle of Fish, and Dylan played for him a song he had just written; Tyson would later say that he believed, though he was not sure, that the song was "Blowin' in the Wind". Tyson decided he could write a song as well, so he asked Albert Grossman, who managed both Ian & Sylvia and Bob Dylan, and "who was the only one [on the local folk music scene] that had a roof over his head:"...'Can I use your apartment tomorrow, cause I want to try and write a song?'"...I went over there and it was a funky, little apartment. Took my guitar and just opened up the case and started to fooling around and strumming. And it took half an hour" to write "Four Strong Winds".

Later, Tyson played the song for his fellow folk musicians at the local music venues Kettle of Fish and The Bitter End, and was surprised to see that the song "blew everybody away."

Tyson would later credit Dylan with giving new impetus to Ian & Sylvia's career by inspiring the duo to follow his lead in writing "original folk songs". As Tyson put it, "We had to go in some direction, because we had used up all the real roots music from the Delta on north. Bob blazed the trail into the wilderness, into unknown territory."

The song was included in Ian & Sylvia's second Vanguard LP, Four Strong Winds (stereo: VSD-2149; monaural: VRS-9133), released July 1963. The album entered the Billboard Top LPs chart at number 150 the week of September 28, 1963. The song was a hit in Canada, making number 9 on the single charts there in October 1963.

In the United States, the song did not have the same initial chart success. Ian and Sylvia's single version (released on Vanguard 35021) entered the Cashbox magazine Looking Ahead chart in September 1963. It was then recorded by the Brothers Four in a version that "bubbled under" the Billboard Hot 100 in October 1963. It was released in a country arrangement by Bobby Bare in 1964 and became a number three hit on the U.S. Country singles chart in early 1965. That recording reached just number 40 in Canada.

The song also became a big hit in Norway in 1966 in a Norwegian version, "Mot ukjent sted" by the Vanguards; and a big hit in Sweden in 1967 in a Swedish version, "Mot okänt land", recorded by Hep Stars. (The title of both of these renditions translates to "Towards an Unknown Land".)

== Other versions ==
The song has been recorded by many other artists, including the Journeymen, the Seekers, Judy Collins, the Chad Mitchell Trio, the Browns, Bob Dylan, Marianne Faithfull, the Searchers, Bruce & Terry, John Denver, the Kingston Trio, Trini Lopez, Waylon Jennings, Chad and Jeremy, Joan Baez, Vanity Fare, Glenn Yarborough, Saori Minami, Harry Belafonte, Tony Rice, Johnny Cash, and the Carter Family.

Neil Young recorded the song for his 1978 album Comes a Time, with harmony vocals from Nicolette Larson, and on the Band's The Last Waltz. It has received significant airplay over album oriented rock and classic rock radio stations and has become part of Young's concert repertoire, including featured performances during Young's yearly appearances at Farm Aid benefit concerts. In Canada, his version reached No. 18 on the AC charts, No. 48 on the country charts, and No. 61 on the rock charts.

== Canadian legacy ==
The song is performed on the last night of the Edmonton Folk Music Festival each year.

Tyson and Gordon Lightfoot performed the song at the opening ceremonies of the 1988 Winter Olympics in Calgary.

Ian and Sylvia sang the song together at the 50th anniversary of the Mariposa Folk Festival on July 11, 2010, in Orillia, Ontario. On April 5, 2013, a recording of the song by Ian Tyson was played during the funeral of former Alberta Premier Ralph Klein, as the honour guard brought his urn into the Jack Singer Concert Hall.

The song is referenced in the 1989 novel A Prayer for Owen Meany by John Irving, which deals with Americans living near or across the Canada–United States border. The narrator remembers how the main character Owen loved to hear that song as sung by the character of Hester.
