= Great Speckled Bird (album) =

Studio album by Great Speckled Bird
- Released: October 1969
- Recorded: 1969
- Studios: Jack Clement Recording (Nashville, Tennessee)
- Genre: Country rock
- Length: 43:45
- Label: Ampex A-10103
- Producer: Todd Rundgren

Professional ratings
Review scores
Source	Rating
Allmusic	link
Rolling Stone	(not rated) link
The Village Voice	C+

Great Speckled Bird is a country rock album by Great Speckled Bird, a band formed in 1969 by Canadian musicians Ian and Sylvia Tyson. The other group members at the time of recording were Buddy Cage, on pedal steel guitar, Amos Garrett, on guitar and backup vocals, and N.D. Smart, on drums. Nashville session musicians David Briggs and Norbert Putnam sat in, with Briggs on piano and Putnam on bass guitar. Although founding member Ken Kalmusky is listed in the original liner notes, he had actually departed the group prior to recording.

The album is notable for being the first album to be produced by Todd Rundgren.

== Track listing ==
1. "Love What You're Doing Child" (Ian Tyson) – 3:39
2. "Calgary" (Ian Tyson, Sylvia Tyson) – 3:03
3. "Trucker's Cafe" (Sylvia Tyson) – 3:22
4. "Long Long Time to Get Old" (Ian Tyson) – 3:07
5. "Flies in the Bottle" (Ian Tyson) – 3:47
6. "Bloodshot Beholder" (Ian Tyson) – 2:58
7. "Crazy Arms" (Chuck Seals, Ralph Mooney) – 2:54
8. "This Dream" (Ian Tyson) – 3:40
9. "Smiling Wine" (Sylvia Tyson) – 3:11
10. "Rio Grande" (Ian Tyson, Amos Garrett) – 3:51
11. "Disappearing Woman" (Sylvia Tyson) – 2:10
12. "We Sail" (Sylvia Tyson) – 4:37

== Personnel ==
- Ian Tyson - guitar, lead vocals
- Sylvia Tyson - lead vocals
- Buddy Cage - pedal steel guitar
- Amos Garrett - guitar, backing vocals
- N.D. Smart - drums
- David Briggs - piano
- Norbert Putnam - bass guitar

== Production ==
- Producer: Todd Rundgren
- Recording Engineer: Charlie Tallent
- Art Direction: Bob Cato
- Liner notes: Peter North
- Liner notes - 2006 reissue: Richie Unterberger
