= Whispering Pines: Live at the Getaway =

Live album by Richard Manuel
- Released: March 2002
- Recorded: October 12, 1985
- Genre: Rock
- Length: 68:42
- Label: Dreamsville Records
- Producer: Yoshiro Nagato

Richard Manuel chronology
Whispering Pines: Live at the Getaway (2002)	Live at O'Toole's Tavern (2009)

Professional ratings
Review scores
Source	Rating
Allmusic	3.5/5 stars

Whispering Pines: Live at the Getaway is a live recording by Canadian singer Richard Manuel, chronicling two intimate live shows Manuel performed at The Getaway, a nightclub in Saugerties, New York on October 12, 1985. Released in Japan in March 2002, it is the first solo release from Manuel, who, unlike his former mates from The Band never recorded a proper solo album.

Leaning on Ray Charles songs alongside songs he sang with the Band, Manuel is joined with Rick Danko and Jim Weider, both fellow members of the Band, and harmonica player Sredni Vollmer.

The album was re-released in 2005 on the Canadian Other People's Music label, with an additional four tracks, though this version lacks the alternate version of "Georgia On My Mind" that had ended the original release. Among the bonus tracks is a loose jam that features Manuel's dog, Mitzi, screeching out a vocal line while the band plays a blues line underneath.

== Track listing ==
1. "Grow Too Old" (Bobby Charles, Fats Domino, Dave Bartholomew) – 3:06
2. "Georgia on My Mind" (Hoagy Carmichael, Stuart Gorrell) – 2:35
3. "Instrumental #1 "Jazz" (Richard Manuel) – 3:26
4. "Across the Great Divide" (Robbie Robertson) – 3:24
5. "You Don't Know Me" (Cindy Walker, Eddy Arnold) – 3:03
6. "King Harvest (Has Surely Come)" (Robbie Robertson) – 4:13
7. "I Shall Be Released" (Bob Dylan) – 3:53
8. "The Shape I'm In" (Robbie Robertson) – 4:32
9. "Instrumental #2 "Piano" (Richard Manuel) – 1:50
10. "Miss Otis Regrets" (Cole Porter) – 4:24
11. "Crazy Mama" (J. J. Cale) – 6:22
12. "She Knows" (James Griffin, Robb Royer) – 3:37
13. "Hard Times" (Ray Charles) – 2:57
14. "Chest Fever" (Robbie Robertson) – 5:15
15. "Whispering Pines" (Richard Manuel, Robbie Robertson) – 5:19
16. "Tears of Rage" (Bob Dylan, Richard Manuel) – 4:18
17. "Across the Great Divide" (version 2) (Robbie Robertson) – 3:40
18. "Georgia on My Mind" (version 2) (Hoagy Carmichael, Stuart Gorrell) – 2:37
19. "Piano Quickies #1" (Richard Manuel) – 2:21
20. "Piano Quickies #2" (Richard Manuel) – 1:19
21. "Piano Quickies #3" (Richard Manuel) – 2:11
22. "Mitzi's Blues" (Richard Manuel) – 2:31
- Note: Tracks 1–18 constitute the 2002 Japanese issue.
- Note: Tracks 1–17 and 19–22 constitute the 2005 Canadian issue.

== Personnel ==
=== Performers at The Getaway, October 12, 1985 ===
- Richard Manuel: Electric piano, vocals
- Rick Danko: Acoustic guitar, vocals
- Jim Weider: Electric guitar
- Sredni Vollmer: Harmonica

=== Performers on bonus material ===
- Richard Manuel: Piano, harmonica
- Rick Danko: Bass guitar on "Mitzi's Blues"
- Levon Helm: drums on "Mitzi's Blues"
- Garth Hudson: Piano on "Mitzi's Blues"
- Mitzi: "Lead vocal" on "Mitzi's Blues"
