= Jay Aymar =

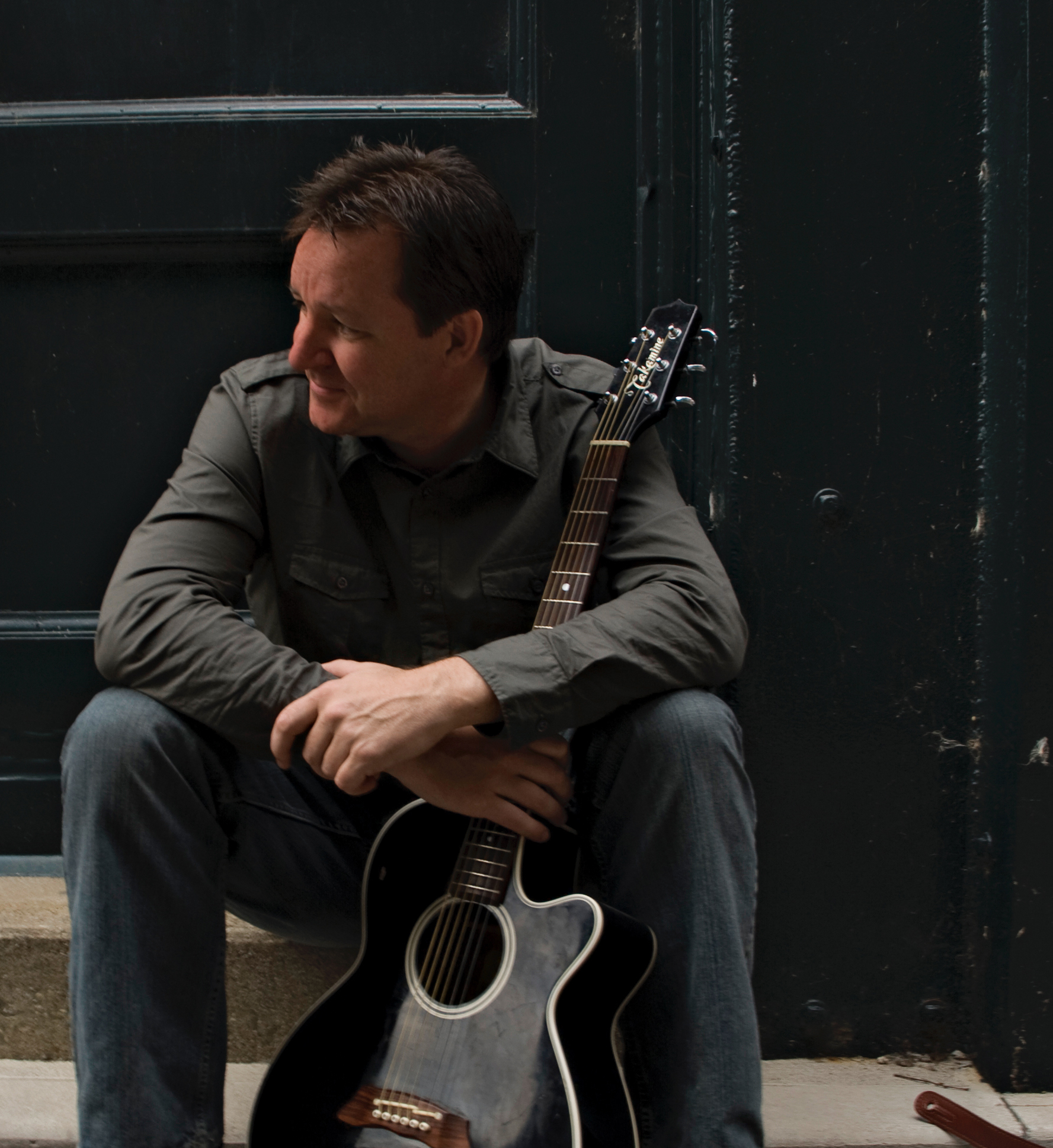

Background information
- Born: Sault Ste. Marie, Ontario
- Genre: Singer-Songwriter
- Instrument: Guitar
- Years active: 1993–present
- Label: Fallen Tree Records
- Website: www.jayaymar.com

Jay Aymar is a Canadian singer-songwriter born and raised in Sault Ste. Marie, Ontario. Until 2020 he toured consistently (often with his band) to over 120 shows per year at clubs, theatres and festivals primarily throughout Canada (occasionally throughout the United States and Europe).

As an acoustic guitar player and singer, he is known for his storytelling through music. His songs cover themes central to everyday life, love and the human condition. An English literature graduate from Carleton University in Ottawa, his songs are influenced by classic literary themes. A 2010 Canadian Folk Music Award Emerging Artist nominee,

In 2008, Canadian musician Ian Tyson recorded Aymar's composition "My Cherry Coloured Rose"— for his album ‘From Yellowhead to Yellowstone and other Love Stories'. The album received high critical praise. (Tyson was nominated for a 2009 Canadian Folk Music Awards for Solo Artist of the Year).

== Life and career ==
Aymar grew up as the youngest of a family of eight children in Sault Ste. Marie, Ontario. He attended Sir James Dunn Secondary School before majoring in English literature at Carleton University in Ottawa, where he "became drunk on language and storytellers like Mark Twain and Stephen Leacock."

After graduating, he began a series of jobs which included freelance writing and various sales positions.

Once discovered, the CBC produced his very first demos in 1993.

He released his first studio album Howling at the Moon in 1996 (now out of print) and has since released five more studio albums and one live album.

In 2008 Aymar's song "My Cherry Coloured Rose" was recorded by Ian Tyson.

Aymar released his sixth studio album, Your Perfect Matador, with producer Michael Phillip Wojewoda on October 12, 2018. The album took inspiration from a woman he called the "Fundy Maiden." He described the 9-tracks as if "You're kind of eavesdropping on our relationship. It's thematically cohesive from start to finish. It plays out like a story."

== Discography ==
Album title	Release date	Details
Cashing in on Peace	2000	Produced and recorded live in one session by Chris Hess and Jevon Rudder. Includes Kevin Quain, Tony Bennetar and Tom Parker. (Out of print)
Halfway Home	2008	Garnered Aymar a 2010 Emerging Artist nomination from the Canadian Folk Music Awards. Producer: Chris Hess.
Passing Through	2011	Blues and folk hybrid album. Recorded live off the floor over three days in Parry Sound Ontario.
Overtime	2013	Produced by Toronto roots music producer David Gavin Baxter.
The Chicken Came First	2015	Work includes an album and accompanying book. Songs for live disc selected by fans.
Your Perfect Matador	October 2018	Released October 2018. Producer: Michael Phillip Wojewoda. Reissued January 17, 2019, on Fallen Tree Records.
