= CFNY: The Spirit of Radio =

2026 Canadian documentary film

- Directed by: Matt Schichter
- Written by: Miles Davren; Matt Schichter; Julia Wallace
- Produced by: Matthew Campagna
- Starring: Geddy Lee; Jim Kerr; Peter Hook; Emily Haines; David Marsden
- Music by: Brendan Canning; Ohad Benchetrit
- Production company: Highball TV
- Distributed by: TVO Docs
- Release date: January 6, 2026 (Canada)
- Running time: 86 minutes
- Country: Canada
- Language: English

CFNY: The Spirit of Radio is a 2026 Canadian documentary film directed by Matt Schichter and produced by Matthew Campagna for Highball TV. The film examines the early history of Toronto-area radio station CFNY-FM, focusing on the period from its 1976 launch through to the early 1990s, during which it became an influential outlet for punk, new wave and alternative music.

== Synopsis ==
The documentary traces CFNY from its origins in a suburban house north of Toronto to its position as one of the few commercial stations in North America programming alternative music. It gives particular attention to program director David Marsden and the on-air culture he assembled.

== Production ==
Schichter, a Canadian filmmaker based in the United Kingdom, was brought on to direct after being approached by executive producer Scot Turner, who had known him from a radio station in Kitchener, Ontario. Schichter had previously worked as a producer and line producer on feature films; the documentary marked his first feature as director.

Filming took place across Canada and the United States. Broken Social Scene's Brendan Canning and Ohad Benchetrit composed an original score.

== Interviewees ==
Musicians appearing in the film include Geddy Lee of Rush, Jim Kerr of Simple Minds, Steven Page of Barenaked Ladies, Emily Haines of Metric, Ben Kowalewicz of Billy Talent, Peter Hook of Joy Division and New Order, Lol Tolhurst of The Cure, Andy McCluskey of Orchestral Manoeuvres in the Dark, and Deryck Whibley of Sum 41.

Former station staff interviewed include David Marsden, Howard Glassman, Fred Patterson, Maie Pauts, Liz Janik and Phil Evans.

== Release ==
TVO Docs acquired Canadian rights from HighballTV, and the film premiered on TVO on 6 January 2026.

In July 2026, PBS acquired United States rights. The film was scheduled to broadcast on PBS in September 2026 and to stream via PBS Passport, preceded by a community screening tour.

== Reception ==
Reviewing the TVO broadcast, television critic Bill Brioux described the film as a nostalgic account of the station and praised the range of musicians the filmmakers assembled, while finding the structure uneven.
