= John Till =

Canadian guitarist (1945–2022)

- Born: December 28, 1945; Stratford, Ontario, Canada
- Died: September 4, 2022 (aged 76) Stratford, Ontario, Canada
- Instrument: Guitar

John Till (December 28, 1945 – September 4, 2022) was a Canadian musician, best remembered as a member of two of Janis Joplin's bands - Kozmic Blues and Full Tilt Boogie.

== Early life ==
Till was born in Stratford, Ontario, on December 28, 1945. His parents were both musicians who had a Dixieland band. His father played guitar, tenor banjo, and double bass; his mother played both classical music and ragtime on the piano. He was descended from puppeteer and entertainer John Coates Till (1843 – 1910), who organised "Till's Marionettes", a popular vaudeville act around the turn of the 20th century.

John Till attended Stratford Central High School, where he met his future bandmates Richard Manuel and Ken Kalmusky.

== Career ==
In 1957, when Till was around twelve years old, he was invited to join Richard Manuel's band, which at the time didn't have a name but would soon become known as The Revols, with Till, Manuel, Ken Kalmusky (bass) and Jim Winkler (drums) forming the core of the group. They were eventually taken under the wing of Ronnie Hawkins, although by then Till had left the band to return to school.

Till played in local Toronto bands on the Yonge Street Strip through the early 1960s until he was asked to join Hawkins's band The Hawks, that Hawkins had to rebuild after all the previous members of his band left to tour with Bob Dylan (see The Band).

Till played with Hawkins for three years before accepting an offer to join Janis Joplin's Kozmic Blues Band, replacing guitarist Sam Andrew. Joplin would eventually disband Kozmic Blues and form the Full Tilt Boogie Band, taking Till and bassist Brad Campbell with her. Till toured extensively with Full Tilt Boogie and appeared on several television shows, including This Is Tom Jones and The Dick Cavett Show. The band also rode the Festival Express, with the Grateful Dead, The Band and Delaney and Bonnie among others, who toured across Canada and played shows in Toronto, Winnipeg and Calgary. Full Tilt Boogie recorded their classic Pearl album, which reached the No. 1 spot on the Billboard charts in February 1971, after Joplin's death.

After Joplin's death, Full Tilt Boogie attempted to regroup and relocated to Woodstock, New York, to write and record new material. While there, Till played and recorded with several other musicians, including Bobby Charles and Peter Yarrow, of Peter, Paul and Mary. When Full Tilt Boogie finally disbanded for good, Till moved back to Stratford, Ontario, retiring from the music industry and raising his family there. In the foreword of Love, Janis (1992), Laura Joplin's biography of her relationship with her famous sister, Till, and his wife are thanked for providing some of the material for the book.

In November 2020, Till and Kalmusky – the latter deceased by then – were awarded Bronze Stars from the city of Stratford for "significant contributions to the cultural or social fabric of Stratford on a national or international scale."

== Personal life ==
Till was married to Dorcas Till until his death. Together, they had two children: Michael and Shawn. He worked as a computer technician in his hometown during his later years.

Till died on September 4, 2022, at his home in Stratford, Ontario, of C.O.P.D. A biography of his life and career is scheduled for publication sometime in 2026.
