= The Vanguards =

Norwegian rock band

The Vanguards were a rock band from Bærum, Norway that debuted in 1961. Although the band disbanded eight years later, members continued to reunite for appearances during the 1970s.

The Vanguards were one of Norway's most popular rock band during the 1960s, playing mostly cover songs. Known band members included Bjørn Nordvang, Terje Rypdal, and Johnny Day.

== Singles ==
- 1963 - "I see you drafting Glugg" / "Charmaine"
- 1963 - "Vanguard special" / "Poinciana"
- 1963 - "A small golden ring" / "Twist little sister"
- 1963 - "Roll over Beethoven" / "Why did I leave you"
- 1964 - "Dream lover" / "Hi-heel Sneaker"
- 1965 - "Mot ukjent sted" / "Smil, sanger og solskinn"
- 1965 - "Lykkeveien" / "Du sa farvel"
- 1966 - "I cry" / "On my mind"
- 1966 - "All I want" (Flexi Single in weekly magazine)
- 1966 - "Home again" / "You've made me glad"
- 1967 - "My ancestral by" / "Be yourself"
- 1967 - "Graduation day" / "Tonight, tonight"
- 1967 - "Golden September" / "Donna Donna"
- 1967 - "Daydream" / "I hide the tears in the rain"
- 1968 - "I think I go along" / "My Song"
- 1968 - "Boogaloo" / "I think I'll disappear"
- 1968 - "Good night little friend" / "stroll around"

== LP's and CD's ==
- 1966 - Home again
- 1966 - The Vanguard (Italy)
- 1967 - The Vanguard (Sweden)
- 1967 - Phnooole
- 1980 - Norwegian rocks golden years
- 1986 - Comanchero
- 1990 - Twang 1990 - Twang
- 2003 - Vanguard Special (double "CD)
