= Ken Kalmusky =

Canadian bassist (1945–2005)

- Kalmusky in 2004

Background information
- Born: 18 November 1945; Stratford, Ontario, Canada
- Died: 19 October 2005 (aged 59) Stratford, Ontario, Canada
- Genres: Rock music
- Instrument: Bass guitar
- Years active: 1957–2005

Ken Kalmusky (18 November 1945–19 October 2005) was a Canadian bassist from Stratford, Ontario. He worked with some of the top names in the music industry, including Ronnie Hawkins, Ian and Sylvia, Jerry Reed, Amos Garrett, and Todd Rundgren. Kalmusky was a session musician and toured the world, playing stages from Massey Hall to The Grand Ole Opry.

== Early career ==
Kalmusky was born in Stratford, Ontario, to saxophonist Walter "JoJo" Kalmusky and Mary Kalmusky. His first band, The Revols, played in the southern Ontario area in the late 1950s and very early 1960s. The members of The Revols were Kalmusky on bass, John Till (Janis Joplin's Full Tilt Boogie Band) on guitar, and Richard Manuel (The Band, Bob Dylan) on piano and lead vocal.

At age 16 Kalmusky left The Revols to join Ronnie Hawkins's band, The Hawks, to tour and travel North America, leaving behind his bandmates for the brief time being as they had decided to complete school. One story when they hooked back up in the US is chronicled on page 65 of Barney Hoskyns's novel Across The Great Divide: The Band and America: Kalmusky, Richard, John, and the Hawks had taken Ronnie's Cadillac for a joy ride in Memphis, Tennessee, and were pulled over by police. Kalmusky (who was underage at the time) was sent to juvenile lockup as they were suspected of stealing the car. When they called Ronnie with their one and only phone call, he said, "Check the dipstick." The dipstick of the Cadillac had Hawkins's name engraved on it, and the youngster was then soon released thereafter. By the end of 1961, the remaining Revols returned to Stratford. Manuel remained with Hawkins, until joining Levon and the Hawks in 1964, while Kalmusky reunited with Till to form The Fab Four, the "Original" Fab Four, at the top of 1962.

The Fab Four had their own weekly television show on CHCH-TV. On 25 April 1965, they opened for The Rolling Stones at Maple Leaf Gardens in Toronto, The Toronto Star put The Fab Four's picture in the ad, and not The Rolling Stones. Kalmusky stated in an interview with Stratford's The Beacon Herald, "They thought we were The Beatles, girls were diving at the car, piling on, as we were driving out of the stadium." In fact, the picture the Toronto Star ran did in fact look a whole lot like the Beatles. By 1966, Kalmusky paralleled the same move Manuel had made after their trip to Arkansas, by leaving The Revols, The Fab Four, and Stratford behind, to become a full-time "Hawk" in Hawkins' band.

After nearly a decade of touring with Ronnie, Ian Tyson called Hawkins and told him he needed a bass player in New York City within the next day or two. Ronnie recommended Kalmusky, who then got on a plane and flew to New York City. He joined Ian and Sylvia and helped in forming the band Great Speckled Bird. The band had a top-10 song, "Trucker's Cafe," on the Canadian Country charts and was also the house band for the CFTO television show, Nashville North. After one season and some success the station renamed the show, The Ian Tyson Show which Kenny made several appearances on.

While in Great Speckled Bird, who was managed by Albert Grossman (manager for Janis Joplin, Bob Dylan, and founder of Bearsville Studios in Woodstock, New York), Kalmusky played on many records as a session musician with the likes of Jerry Reed, Amos Garrett, Todd Rundgren and many others. It has been said that nobody will ever know all of the records Kalmusky played on during this time as Grossman was not a huge fan of giving credit to session musicians at Bearsville Studios, but this was also a regular industry practice at the time.

== Later years ==
After the birth of his children, Kalmusky returned to his hometown and formed the Stratford-based band Plum Loco with his former bandmate, John Till. As a freelance bassist, Kalmusky returned to Hawkins's band several times throughout the 1970s and 1980s, and also worked with David Clayton Thomas (of Blood Sweat and Tears), Jack De Keyzer, King Biscuit Boy, Buffy Saint Marie, Jake Leiske (of Canadian Juno-awarded Farmer's Daughter), and as a regular session bassist, for son, producer David Kalmusky.

In 1984, the three original members of The Revols, Kalmusky, Manuel and Till, re-united at The Stratford Shakespearean Festival Theatre as The Revols, opening for The Band at two sold out "The Band/Revols Reunion Shows." Not long after that concert Richard Manuel committed suicide and Kalmusky, Till, Levon Helm, and Donald 'Philbert' Manuel were seen on the cover of People magazine, carrying Richard's casket out of the funeral service after his passing on 4 March 1986.

After decades of playing, in 2005 Plum Loco released their first album recorded at his brother, Bob Kalmusky's studio. Plum Loco still continues, with John Till's son, Shawn Till on bass replacing Kalmusky.

Kalmusky remained an active session musician, playing on dozens of recordings and performing numerous live shows until his passing.

== Legacy/memoriam ==
Kalmusky's contributions to the music industry have been noted in Barney Hoskyns' novel, Across The Great Divide, Nicholas Jennings' novel, Before The Gold Rush, Levon Helm's novel This Wheel's on Fire. He has inspired many musicians and is immortalized publicly in a painting done of the Revol's located in what is called "the musicians alley," Allen's Alley in Stratford, Ontario, Canada, which celebrates the city's musical heritage which can still be seen vibrantly today.

On 4 August 2008, the City Of Stratford dedicated a band shell in Upper Queen's Park to The Revols. A ceremony erecting a plaque that bears the band's name of its Stratford residents, Ken Kalmusky, Richard Manuel, John Till, Doug Rhodes, Jimmy Winkler, Garth Picot, and David "Dave Mickie" Marsden was unveiled at 12:30pm on 4 August 2008 during the celebration. This was followed by a concert featuring Plum Loco, minus Kalmusky, and followed with a performance by Ronnie Hawkins, with full police escort.

It is also said that in the quite well known picture of Bob Dylan playing a bass with a harmonica around his neck, that this is Ken Kalmusky's bass. Bob was in studio A and Kenny was in studio B at Columbia Records in NYC, Dylan was bored in his session and went down to where Ian and Sylvia were recording in the other studio and picked up Kalmusky's bass and started messing around, hence the not so common picture was snapped of Dylan playing bass.

== Personal life ==
In 1968, while he was playing in Hollywood, California, Kalmusky's wife Sandra who was 8½ months pregnant returned to Stratford, Ontario, Canada to give birth to their first child, Kim Kalmusky. Kalmusky remained on tour, and continued making records in Nashville, New York, and Toronto for 2 more years until 1970. This year was the birth of his second child, David Kalmusky. Kalmusky then returned to, and re-settled in his hometown of Stratford, Ontario, where it all started with Richard Manuel and John Till of The Revols back in 1958.

== Death ==
Kalmusky's two-year battle with cancer ended in Stratford, Ontario, on 19 October 2005. He is survived by his wife Karen, ex-wife Sandra, and his two children Kim and David. He was only a month short off 60.

== Photo gallery ==
Ken Kalmusky with Ian and Sylvia in 1969

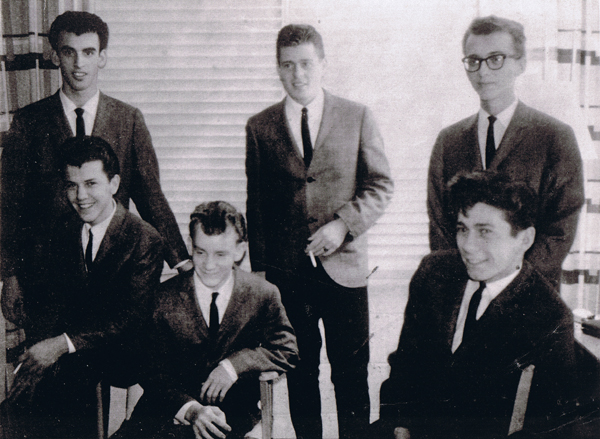
The Revols in 1957

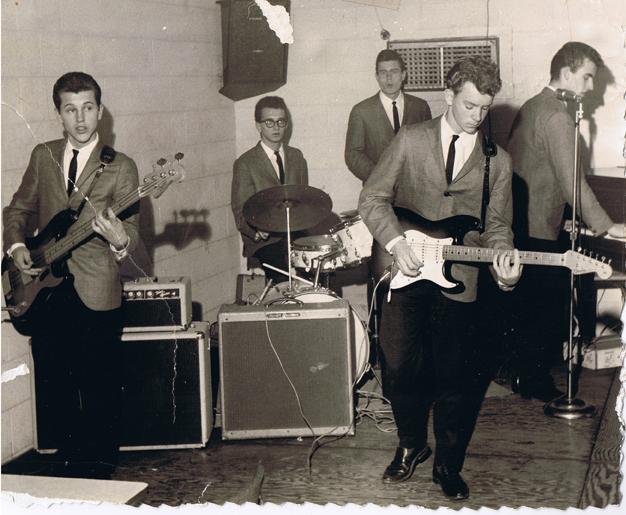
The Revols in 1958

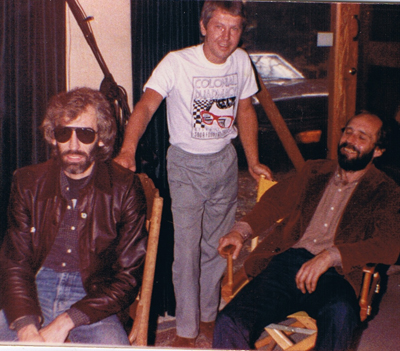
Richard, Ken, John from the Revols at The Band's Studio in Woodstock New York 1984

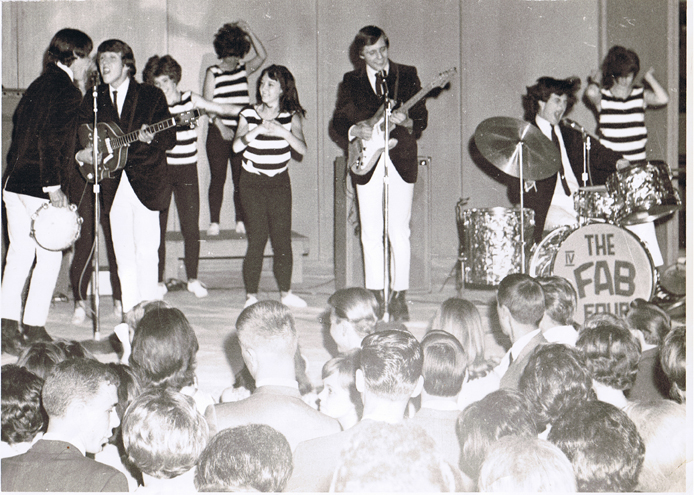
The Fab Four TV Show

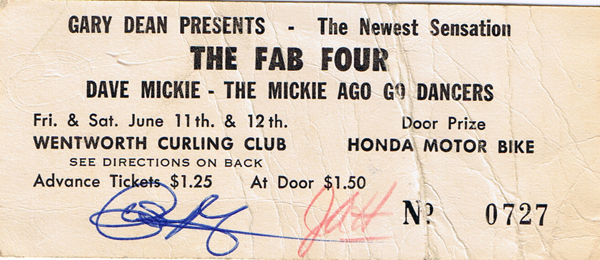
Fab Four Concert Ticket
