= Toby Dancer =

- Birth name: Adrian Chornowol
- Born: 1953
- Origin: Edmonton, Alberta, Canada
- Died: 9 July 2004; Toronto
- Genres: Classical; country; jazz
- Occupation(s): Music producer, pianist
- Instrument: Piano
- Years active: 1975–1990
- Formerly of: The Chinook Arch Riders

Toby Dancer (1953 – 9 July 2004, Toronto) was a Canadian pianist and music producer, best known for her work on Ian Tyson's albums Cowboyography and I Outgrew The Wagon.

== Life ==
Dancer was born as Adrian Chornowol to Ukrainian-Canadian Edmonton Symphony Orchestra musician Walter Chornowol. Dancer was a musical child prodigy.

Dancer was the music director of local country music show Sun Country; she was also a music arranger and played piano in her sister's jazz band. She became a member of Ian Tyson's touring band The Chinook Arch Riders, and later produced two of his albums.

Dancer was the victim of a stabbing in her Rossdale home by two people in 1989; the same year, she received Cowboyography's gold record certification with knife scars still visible under sunglasses. Some time later she moved to Vancouver, where she started socially transitioning, using a new name (she apparently rejected the idea of gender-affirming surgery). During that time her heroin and morphine addictions started.

Around six years before her death, Dancer was sober and homeless; she moved to Toronto, attending the Parkdale Activities and Recreational Centre, where she performed with the centre's social worker and drummer Zepheniah James. She also became the music director and choir leader of Emmanuel Howard Park United Church, led by reverend Cheri DiNovo. She died aged 51 of an accidental drug overdose.

A 2012 bill (proposed by then-MPP DiNovo) which amended the Ontario Human Rights Code to include gender identity in its protected categories was dubbed Toby's Act in her honour. She is also commemorated by a stained glass window in Roncesvalles United Church.

== Discography ==
All of Dancer's discography was made before her transition and she is credited under her deadname.

- Liam Clancy – Farewell To Tarwaithie, 1975 (instruments)
- Tim Feehan – Sneak Preview, 1981 (instruments)
- Ian Tyson – Old Corrals & Sagebrush, 1983 (writing and arrangement)
- Ian Tyson – Ian Tyson, 1984 (writing and arrangement)
- Stewart MacDougall – Clean Slate / Up To Me, 1985 (production)
- Ian Tyson – Cowboyography, 1986 (instruments, production, writing and arrangement)
- Gabrielle Bujold – C'est Bien Toi, 1987 (production)
- Gabrielle Bujold – Seule à rêver, 1988 (instruments, production, writing and arrangement)
- Gabrielle Bujold – Private & Confidential, 1988 (production)
- Gabrielle Bujold – Après Lui, 1988 (production)
- Bob E. Lee West and The Mainstreet Band – This Old Freight Train / You're Just A Call Away, 1988 (production)
- Gordon Cormier & Loretta Cormier – Headin' Home, 1988 (instruments)
- Ian Tyson – Old Corrals And Sagebrush & Other Cowboy Culture Classics, 1988 (writing and arrangement)
- Ian Tyson – I Outgrew The Wagon, 1989 (instruments, additional vocals)
- Ian Tyson – Irving Berlin (is 100 yrs old today), 1989 (production)
- Big Miller And The Blues Machine – Live At Athabaska University, 1990 (instruments)
