= The Speckled Bird =

Novel by W. B. Yeats and William H. O'donnell

- Author: W. B. Yeats, William H. O'donnell
- Language: English
- Genre: Psychology, Autobiographical Novel

The Speckled Bird is an autobiographical novel, by the Irish poet, writer, mystic and Nobel laureate in literature in 1923, W. B. Yeats. The novel has been written in four versions, between 1896 - 1903, and Yeats has given this name to the last version, taken from the Old Testament, Book of Jeremiah, chapter 12, verse 9: "Mine heritage is unto me as a speckled bird, the birds round about are against her; come ye, assemble all the beasts of the field, come to devour." The novel was never published during Yeats's lifetime. As referred to by Yeats himself when he wrote in his Autobiographies, in its chapter, The Trembling of the Veil: a novel that I could neither write nor cease to write, which had Hodos Chameliontos for its theme . The novel was published for the first time in 1976, including the three previous variants which Yeats wrote for his novel. The second edition, with new annotations being added, was published in 2003. Both of the editions were edited, expounded and elucidated, by the author and literary critic William H. O'donnell.

== Background and setting ==
Yeats started to work on The Speckled Bird in 1896 and wrote four recognizably different versions of it before ceasing to work on his venture in 1903. The novel is "finished" in the sense that its plot reaches an ending, but Yeats did not complete the extensive refining and revising which would have been obligatory to bring the speckled bird up to his literary merits.

Given that perspective and Yeats's point of view that elaborated surface realism was essential in writing novels, it was almost unavoidable that The Speckled Bird's 744 manuscript pages would include a very large portion of biographical matter. The major characters are corresponding to Yeats, his father, Maud Gonne, MacGregor Mathers, and Olivia Shakespear. The location is based on the country houses of Edward Martyn, Count Florimond de Basterot, and Lady Gregory in County Galway and County Clare. But The Speckled Bird is not a roman à clef. Instead, real-life aspects were selected from a variety of sources according to the direct artistic objective and gathered together into fictional synthesis.

The Speckled Bird, as an autobiographical novel, is related in its context to Yeats's attempt to found a mystical order of Celtic Mysteries. During the period when he was working on the novel, his written articles and papers on some publications, were full of statements in which he expressed his wish that the predominating age of science and materialism, would soon be replaced by a new age of imagination, artistic beauty, and vivid symbols. It is not surprising that those general views are repeated in the novel, but the correspondences between Yeats's Celtic Mystical Order and the novel's mystical society are particularly close. In the novel, the autobiographical hero adamantly requires that the rituals for his mystical order be formed from knowledge that comes in dreams and visions. As Yeats said of the Celtic Mysteries Order rituals: "My rituals were not to be made deliberately, like a poem, but all got by that method Mathers had explained to me" of visions induced by symbols. The Celtic Mystical Order was to "find its manuals of devotion in all imaginative literature." This religion of beauty and of the power of the visionary imagination holds a central place in all versions of the novel, even though the hero's attempt to organize a mystical society does not appear until the 1900 and 1902 versions.

The main theme for the novel was described by Yeats as the Hodos Chameliontos (the path of the Chameleon). Broadly speaking, Yeats refers to his occult involvement among the ranks of the mystical order of the Golden Dawn, during this period (the end of the 1890s), as the background for writing the novel. This term is taken from a hand-written text, a Cabbalistic one, shown to Yeats, by Samuel Liddell MacGregor Mathers, which includes a coloured diagram of the ten Cabalistic sephiroth and their interconnecting lines (or "paths"). The term itself refers to the right path, which the students of the Hermetic Order of the Golden Dawn must pursue, in order to proceed themselves through that Hodos Chameliontos and in order to attain for themselves that very knowledge of the adept. Also, the students must progress through this path without deviation, "turning neither aside unto the right hand, nor unto the left wherein are the wicked and frightening" paths that would lead to incertitude and debacle. Only "the path of the Chameleon, that Path namely, which is alone moving upwards" to supernatural wisdom will lead them so.

== Plot ==
=== First version ===
The first version, written in early 1897, is basically a tale of idealized love, informed by Plato's thought and a highly valuable work of art. It is set in the Aran Islands, where the young hero's peculiar father has built a house and keeps the customary prayer hours until, after the Virgin Mary appears in a vision, he dedicates himself solely to visions. A visit by the beautiful young heroine fills the hero with romantic love that accompanies the mystical reverence he has bequeathed from his father, although the hero himself does not see any Marian apparition, in contrast to his father's ones.

=== Second version ===
The second version, whose name is The Lilies of the Lord, was written probably in the first half of 1897 and the summer and fall of 1898. It has eighty-five extant pages and is now missing only one page. Its location is a remote estate in the west of Ireland, but on the mainland rather than the Aran Islands. The father has a private chapel and, as in the earlier version, sees the Virgin Mary in visions. The visit of the young heroine is given expanded treatment. The son does not have any visions in either of the two earliest versions and there is no mention of ritual magic or occultism. Yeats probably did not do much work on the novel in 1899.

=== Third version ===
The untitled third version, to which Yeats referred in his letters as "Michael," the hero's name in all versions of the novel, has 285 extant holograph pages, treble the length of its predecessors. The setting for the 1900 version is still on a remote estate in the west of Ireland, but the father is now only a minor character who, after spending his youth in art schools and womanizing on the Continent, is an irreligious recluse. The son, instead of the father, sees a vision of the Virgin Mary. The opening one-third of this 1900 version is an expansion of the two earlier versions, with considerable new attention given to the young hero's vision. The remainder of the 1900 version takes the hero to London where he and an occultist, who is closely modeled on MacGregor Mathers, begin to plan a mystical order. News that the heroine has married someone else overwhelms the hero, and, at the suggestion of the occultist, he goes to Paris to copy occult manuscripts, hoping that the change of scene will comfort him. Soon afterwards he receives alarming reports that the occultist has usurped control of their mystical order and has altered the rituals so that they no longer reflect the hero's artistic ideals. The 1900 version breaks off after the hero visits a bizarre old occultist who sunbathes nude in a coffin and rants about a supposed plot by Jesuits to subvert the mystical order.

=== Final version ===
In the final version, The Speckled Bird is concerned with the artist’s quest for spiritual truth. The novel begins in the west of Ireland with Michael Hearne’s gradual discovery of the existence of a spiritual world through meditation, dream, trance, and vision, and his awakening to the spiritual significance of myth, art, folklore, nature, and woman. Later in London he attempts to found a mystical order which would unite religious, artistic, and natural emotions, or, to use the Platonic terms, truth, beauty, and love. He gathers a group of artists and mystics around him to help devise rituals which would evoke the supernatural, and the objects and instruments of which would embody artistic beauty. The novel concludes with the hero at a railway station in Paris, setting out for the East, now to Arabia, now to Persia, still driven by his dominant aim, and convinced that in the East he would surely find a doctrine that would “reconcile religion with the natural emotions and explain these emotions”.

== Primary Sources ==
- The speckled bird at Google Books
- The speckled bird, Volume 1 at Google Books
- The Speckled Bird: An Autobiographical Novel with Variant Versions at Google Books
- Literatim Transcription of the Manuscripts of William Butler Yeats's the Speckled Bird at Google Books
- OCCULTURE: W.B. YEATS’ PROSE FICTION AND THE LATE NINETEENTH AND EARLY TWENTIETH-CENTURY OCCULT REVIVAL; A DISSERTATION SUBMITTED FOR THE DEGREE DOCTOR OF PHILOSOPHY BY LAURA A. SWARTZ
- The speckled bird : an autobiographical novel with variant versions at the Internet Archive
