= Richard Manuel =

Canadian pianist, singer and songwriter (1943–1986)

- Manuel in 1969

Background information
- Born: Richard George Manuel; April 3, 1943; Stratford, Ontario, Canada
- Died: March 4, 1986 (aged 42) Winter Park, Florida, U.S.
- Genres: Rock; Americana; soul; country; jazz; roots rock
- Occupations: Musician; singer; songwriter
- Instruments: Vocals; piano; drums
- Years active: 1957–1986
- Label: Capitol
- Formerly of: The Band; Ronnie Hawkins; The Revols; Bob Dylan

Richard George Manuel (April 3, 1943 – March 4, 1986) was a Canadian musician, singer, and songwriter, best known as a pianist and one of three lead singers in the Band, for which he was posthumously inducted into the Rock and Roll Hall of Fame in 1994.

Manuel's singing alternated between a soul-influenced baritone that drew frequent comparisons to Ray Charles and a delicate falsetto. Though The Band had three vocalists sharing lead and harmony parts, Manuel was sometimes seen as the group's primary vocalist.

== Biography ==
=== Early life and career ===
Manuel was born in Stratford, Ontario, Canada. His father, Ed, was a mechanic employed at a Chrysler dealership, and his mother was a schoolteacher. He was raised with his three brothers, and the four sang in the church choir. Manuel took piano lessons beginning when he was nine, and enjoyed playing piano and rehearsing with friends at home. Some of his childhood influences were Ray Charles, Bobby Bland, Jimmy Reed and Otis Rush.

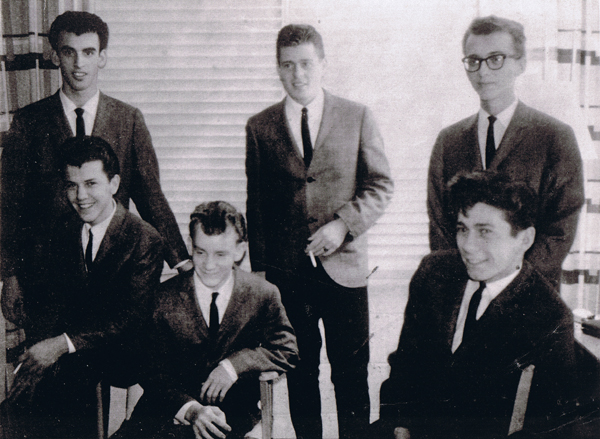
Manuel (back row, left) with the Revols in 1958, aged fifteen

Around 1957, Manuel joined The Rebels, a local Stratford band featuring guitarist John Till (later of the Full Tilt Boogie Band). With Manuel on piano and vocals and his friend Jimmy Winkler on drums, the band was rounded out by bass player Ken Kalmusky (later a founding member of Great Speckled Bird). In short order, the group changed its name to the Revols, in deference to Duane Eddy and the Rebels. Although Richard was the primary vocalist, the line up expanded to include original singer Doug 'Bo' Rhodes. Guitarist Till would later be replaced by Garth Pictot.

Manuel first became acquainted with Ronnie Hawkins and the Hawks in the summer of 1960 when the Revols opened for them at Pop Ivy's in Port Dover, Ontario. According to Levon Helm, Hawkins remarked to him about Manuel: "See that kid playing piano? He's got more talent than Van Cliburn." The following spring, Hawkins found himself opening for The Revols at Stratford Coliseum. After the show, he offered to manage the band, and sent them to play at one of his clubs, The Rockwood, in Fayetteville, Arkansas. In mid-September 1961, after the Revols returned from their southern journey, Hawkins recruited Manuel to his backing band The Hawks, replacing piano player Stan Szelest.

=== The Hawks ===
Manuel was 18 when he joined Hawkins's backing group, the Hawks. At this time the band already consisted of 21-year-old Levon Helm on drums, 17-year-old Robbie Robertson on guitar and 17-year-old Rick Danko on bass; 24-year-old organist Garth Hudson joined that Christmas, followed by two temporary members (saxophonist Jerry Penfound and singer Bruce Bruno). Increasingly antagonized by Hawkins's disdain for marijuana and contemporary music trends, the group left the singer's employ in 1964. Initially, they were known as the Levon Helm Sextet (as Helm had accumulated the most time with Hawkins) before changing their name to the Canadian Squires and then to Levon and the Hawks. With Helm serving as nominal leader because of his longevity with the Hawkins group, it was Manuel who sang most of the songs in the group's repertoire. It was as Levon and the Hawks, after the departure of Penfound and Bruno, that they introduced themselves to their blues hero, Sonny Boy Williamson. They planned a collaboration with Williamson, but he died before their plans could be realized.

In 1965, Helm, Hudson, and Robertson helped back American bluesman John Hammond on his album So Many Roads. Hammond recommended the Hawks to Bob Dylan, who tapped them to serve as his backing band when he switched to an electric sound; through 1966, they toured Europe and the United States with Dylan, enduring the ire of Dylan's folk fans, who subjected the group to hissing and booing.

=== The Band ===
==== Big Pink ====
In 1967, while Dylan recovered from a motorcycle accident at his home in Woodstock, New York, the group moved there also, renting a house clad in pink-painted asbestos siding, which became known as "Big Pink", located on 100 acres (0.40 km^{2}) at 2188 Stoll Road (later 56 Parnassus Lane) in nearby West Saugerties, New York. Supported by a retainer from Dylan, they were able to experiment with a new sound garnered from the country, soul, rhythm and blues, gospel and rockabilly music that they loved. As Helm (who was disheartened by the reaction to Dylan's new sound) had been temporarily absent from the group since late 1965, Manuel taught himself to play drums during the hiatus. In the Band era he would occasionally assume the drummer's stool when Helm played mandolin or guitar. His loose, improvisatory drumming style was notably different from Helm's taut, soul-influenced approach, as exemplified by his unique performances on "Rag Mama Rag" and "Evangeline".

The early months in Woodstock also allowed Manuel and Robertson to develop as songwriters. After recording numerous demos and signing with Albert Grossman, they secured a 10-album contract with Capitol Records in early 1968. They originally signed as "The Crackers" (although "The Honkies" had also been considered). Helm rejoined the fold as sessions got under way for the recording of their debut album, Music from Big Pink. The group proceeded to take what they had learned with Dylan and used one of his songs in the process. They combined it with their idea of the perfect album, switching solos, and singing harmonies modeled after the gospel sound of their musical heroes The Staple Singers. Manuel stated,

"During the conception of Big Pink, we discovered a whole vocal thing that we weren't aware that we'd even had before, and I remember listening to playbacks after the sessions of songs and thinking, "I really like this stuff, and I don't have anything to compare it to, but I really like it, and I hope everybody else does, but I really think this is strong."

Manuel and Robertson each contributed four songs; among Manuel's contributions was "Tears of Rage," which he co-wrote with Dylan. Recordings of the country ballad "Long Black Veil" and Dylan's "I Shall Be Released" and the Danko–Dylan collaboration "This Wheel's on Fire" rounded out the album. Music from Big Pink was released with the group name given as simply "The Band." This would be their name for the rest of the group's existence. While reaching only No. 30 on the Billboard charts, the album would have a profound influence on the nascent country rock and roots rock movements. Shortly after the release of the album, the newly financially secure Manuel married his girlfriend, Jane Kristiansen, a model from Toronto, whom he had dated intermittently since the Hawks days. They would become the parents of two children.

==== Movie role, substance abuse, move to Malibu ====
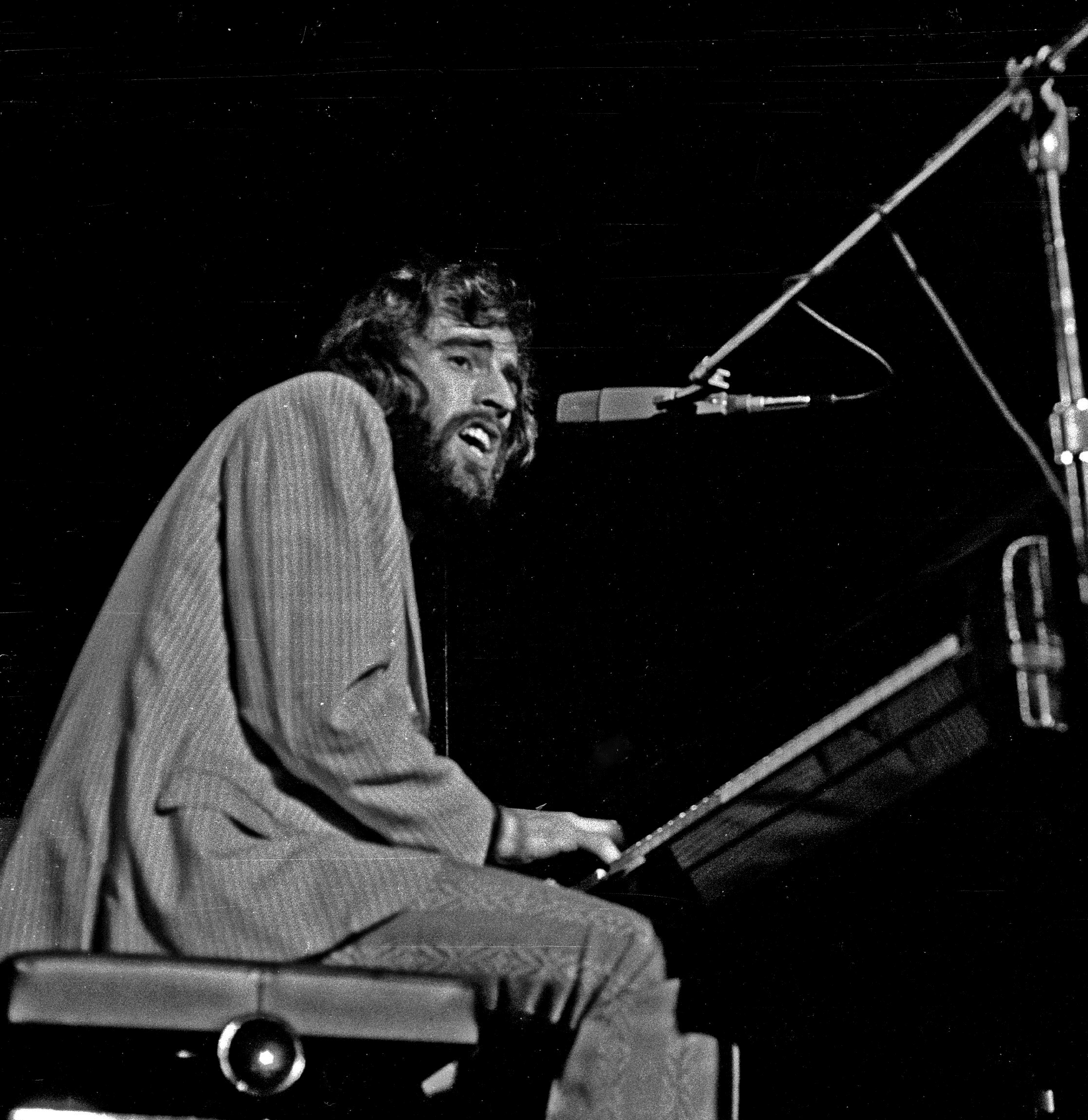
Manuel, 1971

In 1970, Manuel acted in the Warner Bros. film Eliza's Horoscope, an independently distributed Canadian drama written and directed by Gordon Sheppard. He portrayed "the bearded composer," performing alongside Tommy Lee Jones, former Playboy Bunny Elizabeth Moorman, and Lila Kedrova; Robertson appeared as an extra. Taking four years to complete, it was not released until 1975.

During this period, Manuel's songs were widely recorded. "Blues for Breakfast" (an early Woodstock-era song) was performed by Cass Elliot on Dream a Little Dream (1968); shortly thereafter, Joan Baez performed an a cappella arrangement of "Tears of Rage" on Any Day Now (1968), Blood, Sweat & Tears included a big band-inflected arrangement of "Lonesome Suzie" on Blood, Sweat & Tears 3 (1970) and Karen Dalton included her rendition of "In a Station" on In My Own Time (1971). He was credited with writing only three songs ("When You Awake," "Whispering Pines," and "Jawbone") on The Band (1969) and two ("Sleeping" and "Just Another Whistle Stop") on Stage Fright (1970); all of these songs were credited as collaborations with Robertson, who had assumed dominance in the group's affairs with Grossman.

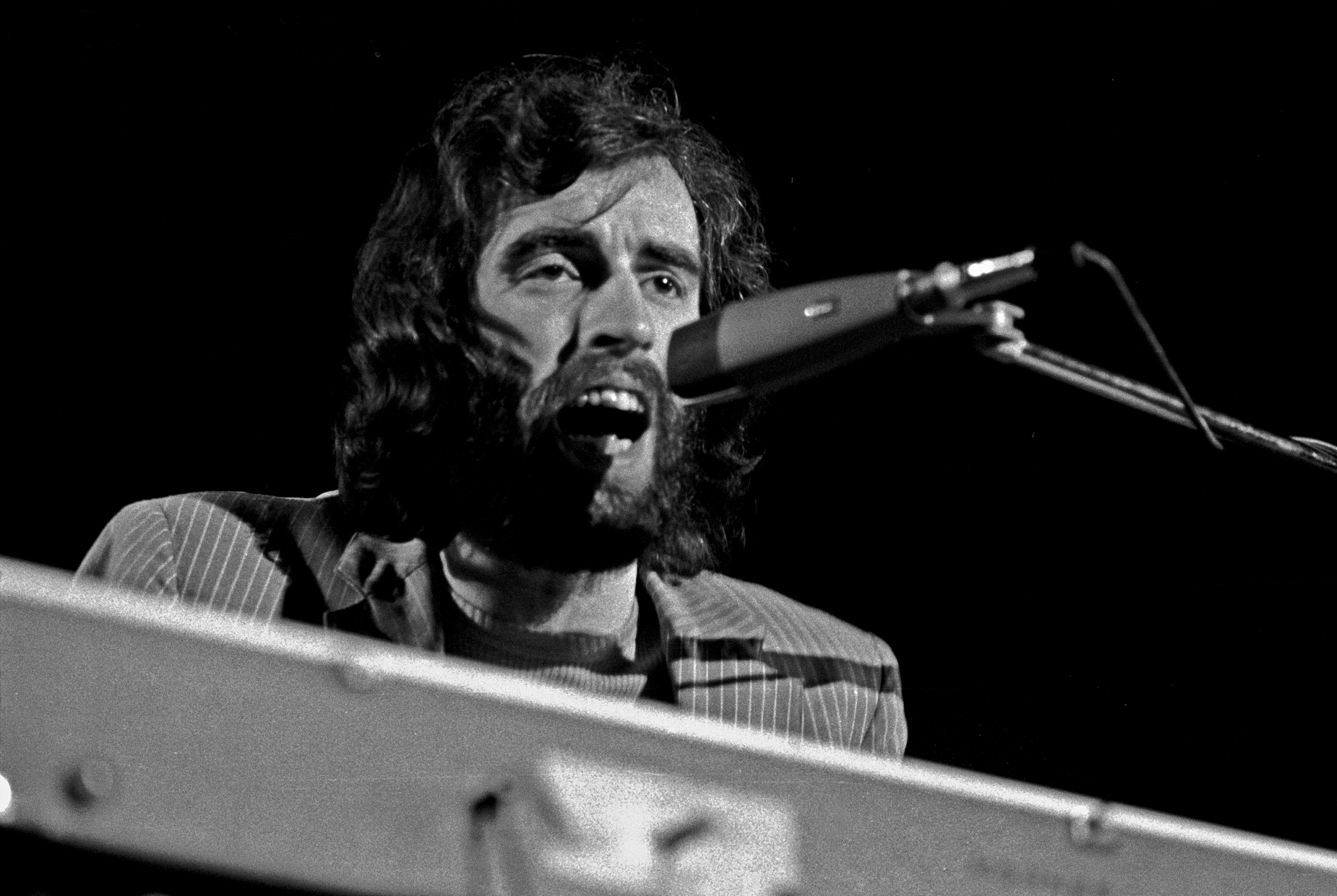
Manuel in Hamburg, 1971

By Cahoots (1971), producer John Simon observed that "Robbie didn't ... consciously intimidate him ... but when you met Robbie he was so smooth and urbane and witty, whereas Richard was such a gee-golly-gosh kind of guy." The influence of Manuel's increasing use of heroin may have also contributed to the diminution of his songwriting abilities.

Throughout 1972, Manuel's alcoholism was one of a variety of factors (including Robertson's own writer's block) that began to impede The Band's recording and performance schedule. Years later, Robertson said that Manuel "scared us to death ... we didn't know what the next day might bring, what would come out of this monster that had seeped out of the woodwork." Although Jane Manuel lamented that "people thought it was amusing to watch this guy drowning," the Manuels briefly separated during this period but reconciled before the impending birth of their second child, Josh. According to Mason Hoffenberg (who hung out with Manuel throughout 1972–1973 at the request of Grossman, although they never roomed together), Manuel had "stopped [using heroin] and got into this drinking thing ... I'm supposed to head off all the juvenile dope dealers up here who hang around rock stars. So I answer the phone and say Richard's not here... But if they actually come over to the house, he can't say no. He's brilliant, that guy. An incredible composer... The four other guys in the Band are serious about working and he's really hanging them up. They can't work without him and there's no way to get him off his ass. He feels bad about it, he's just strung out."

In 1973, the group once again followed the lead of Dylan by relocating to Malibu, California. Before leaving the Hudson Valley, they convened at Bearsville Studios to record an album of vintage rock and roll songs (some of which had been performed by The Hawks) entitled Moondog Matinee, in homage to Alan Freed's radio show. Although Manuel was initially reluctant to perform, the album elicited some of his finest vocal performances, including renditions of the Bobby "Blue" Bland R&B standard "Share Your Love with Me," The Platters's "The Great Pretender," and Jerry Leiber and Mike Stoller's tongue-in-cheek gospel song "Saved". Helm had this to say about Manuel during this period: "[H]e was drinking pretty hard, but once he got started, man: drums, piano, play it all, sing, do a lead in one of them high, hard-assed keys to sing in. Richard just knew how a song was supposed to go. Structure, melody; he understood it."

==== Back with Dylan ====
The Band gradually resurfaced on the live circuit. Following a warmup show in Osaka, Japan, in July 1973, they played to receptive audiences at the Summer Jam at Watkins Glen and on a double bill with the Grateful Dead at Jersey City's Roosevelt Stadium two days later. In the autumn, the group backed up Dylan on Planet Waves, his first full album of original songs since 1970, before serving as his backup group on his first tour in nearly eight years.

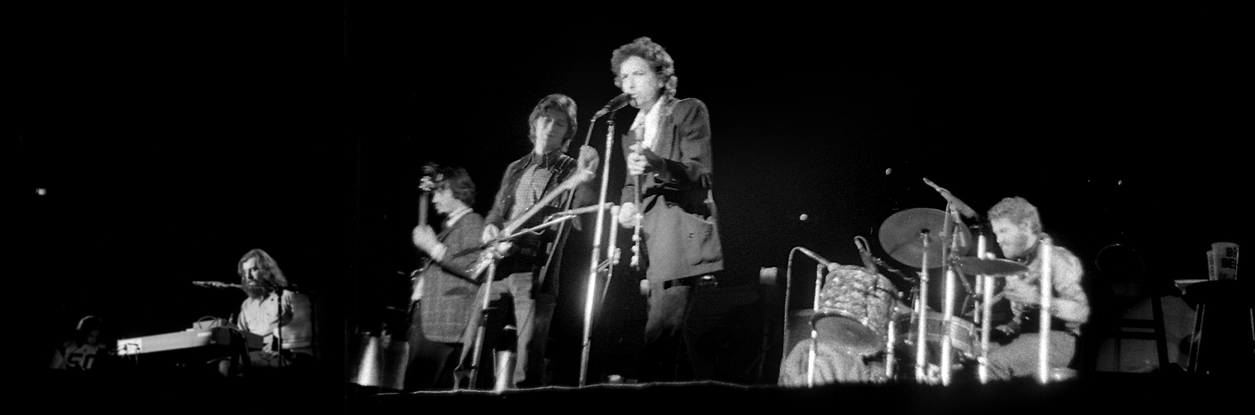
Manuel, left, with Bob Dylan and the Band in 1974

The 40 concerts of the Bob Dylan and the Band 1974 Tour, from January 3 to February 14, 1974, were meandering musical marathons featuring two sets of Dylan backed by The Band, two Band sets, and a Dylan acoustic set. The ensuing live album from the tour, Before the Flood, reveals that Manuel was still capable of reaching the falsetto on "I Shall Be Released".

==== The Last Waltz ====
The Band continued performing throughout 1974, oscillating between road jaunts centered around Crosby, Stills, Nash and Young (alongside Joni Mitchell, Jesse Colin Young and The Beach Boys on select dates of a summer stadium tour) and Eric Clapton (who continued an intimate friendship with Manuel rooted in a 1968 Woodstock summit) as a seemingly atrophied secondary co-headliner with a stagnant repertoire. But the long delayed follow up to Cahoots (Northern Lights – Southern Cross) was still more than a year from release, the group struggled to attract formerly enthusiastic audiences in selected major markets. A proposed August 1974 headlining performance at Boston Garden was ultimately cancelled due to poor ticket sales.

By 1975, Robertson had expressed his dissatisfaction with prolonged touring and was acting in an increasingly administrative capacity, as the move to Malibu and his refusal to allow the group to join Bearsville Records had seen him take the managerial reins on a de facto basis from an increasingly diffident Grossman. According to Helm, Manuel was now living an unstable life and consuming eight bottles of Grand Marnier liqueur every day, in addition to a prodigious cocaine addiction. Manuel also separated from his wife Jane in 1976, and a belated divorce ensued years later. While living in a house owned by actress Goldie Hawn, Manuel attempted suicide at least twice (by self-immolation and shooting himself in the head with a BB gun).

During this period, Manuel emerged as a driving force behind the sessions that culminated in Clapton's album No Reason to Cry (1976). The album was recorded at the Band's new Shangri-La Studios, where Manuel lived for about a year in a bungalow that had once served as the stable for Bamboo Harvester, the horse that portrayed the titular character on the 1960s sitcom Mister Ed. Manuel gave Clapton the song "Beautiful Thing" (a 1967 Band demo that Danko helped him finish) and provided vocals for "Last Night."

On the group's final full-fledged tour in the summer of 1976, Manuel was still recovering from a car accident earlier in the year; several tour dates were subsequently canceled after a power-boating accident near Austin, Texas, that necessitated the hiring of Tibetan healers, in a scenario reminiscent of Robertson's pre-show hypnosis, before their first concert as the Band at San Francisco's Winterland Ballroom in April 1969. As Northern Lights – Southern Cross had stalled at No. 26 in the autumn of 1975, many of the performances were confined to theaters and smaller arenas (including the Santa Cruz Civic Auditorium and the Long Island Arena), culminating in an opening slot for the ascendant ZZ Top at the Nashville Fairgrounds in September. The quality of the shows was frequently contingent upon Manuel's relative sobriety. Throughout the tour, he struggled with the high vocal registers of "Tears of Rage," "In a Station" and "I Shall Be Released" but offered impassioned, raging versions of the prophetic "The Shape I'm In" and "King Harvest (Has Surely Come)."

The Band played its final show as its original configuration at Winterland on Thanksgiving Day of 1976. The concert was filmed in 35 mm by Robertson confidant and longtime Band fan Martin Scorsese for the documentary The Last Waltz. Manuel sings "The Shape I'm In" as well as contributing piano and backing vocals. Initially the group intended to end only live performances as the Band, and each member was initially kept on a retainer of $2,500 per week under a new contract with Warner Brothers. However, by 1978, the group had drifted apart.

=== Session work, attempted comeback and continued struggles with substance abuse ===
Taking advantage of this new solace, Manuel moved to Garth Hudson's ranch outside Malibu. He entered an alcohol and drug rehabilitation program, becoming clean and sober for the first time in years in August 1978. He also was eventually remarried to his longtime girlfriend, Arlie Litvak. Having initially become enamored of Manuel after hearing "Lonesome Suzie," the Toronto-born, 21-year-old Litvak became acquainted with the singer on the 1974 tour and subsequently moved into the Moon house with Manuel in 1977. In 1980, he contributed electric piano and clavinet to Happy Traum's Bright Morning Stars and background vocals to Hudson's Music for Our Lady Queen of the Angels.

During this period, Danko and Manuel began to tour clubs as a semi-acoustic duo. These concerts would continue into the Band reunion era and often included fellow Woodstock habitué Paul Butterfield as a special guest. Along with Hudson, Manuel played on several instrumental cues composed by Robertson for the soundtrack of Raging Bull (1980). Manuel and Hudson also contributed to "Between Trains," a new song by Robertson that appeared on the soundtrack of The King of Comedy (1983), and the original soundtrack of Kent State, a 1981 television film based on the Kent State shootings. Throughout the early 1980s, he sat in on little-publicized gigs in L.A.-area clubs with The Pencils, an ensemble that included vocalists/ multi-instrumentalists Marty Grebb and Terry Danko, founding Blues Image percussionist Joe Lala and former Beach Boys drummer Ricky Fataar. Along with Stephen Stills and Mike Finnigan, he contributed backing vocals to a 1983 album by the band that was left unreleased after Danko was in a debilitating car accident.

Although he continued to grapple with writer's block, Manuel wrote a new song, "Was That Any Way to Say Goodbye," with the younger Danko and Grebb. A year later, he contributed piano to Willie Nelson and Webb Pierce's 1982 remake of "In the Jailhouse Now" (a country hit for the latter in 1955) and background vocals to "Rivers of Tears" on Bonnie Raitt's acclaimed Green Light.

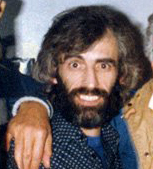
Manuel in 1983

The Band reformed in 1983 without Robertson, who permanently stopped touring after The Last Waltz. Instead, guitarist and Helm protege Jim Weider augmented the returning four members along with a variety of irregular additional musicians, including the Cate Brothers. Having reclaimed some of his vocal range lost in the years of drug abuse, Manuel performed old hits such as "The Shape I'm In", "Chest Fever" and "I Shall Be Released" with new conviction alongside personal favorites such as Cindy Walker and Eddy Arnold's "You Don't Know Me" and James Griffin and Robb Royer's "She Knows."

By the time of the reunion, Danko, Helm and their families had moved back to the Woodstock area from Malibu. Manuel returned with his wife in the spring of 1984. In poor health and fearing that he had contracted AIDS from decades of sexual promiscuity and drug abuse, he contemplated recording a Robertson-produced solo album and resumed using cocaine, heroin, and alcohol. On one occasion, Manuel absconded with journalist and old friend Al Aronowitz's record collection in a midnight burglary to fund his addictions. Following a detox stint at the behest of Albert Grossman, Manuel had several months of sobriety. He undertook a successful solo residency (centered around "his favorite Ray Charles songs" and "Tin Pan Alley classics") at The Getaway, a club midway between Woodstock and nearby Saugerties, New York. Guests such as Danko and Weider frequently sat in. During this period, Manuel also co-wrote a new song, "Breaking New Ground," with Gerry Goffin and Carole King. However, he ultimately "fell off the wagon with a thud" in the spring of 1985.

In addition to their other activities, Manuel and Danko toured throughout 1985 with "The 20th Anniversary Tribute to The Byrds," a tribute group led by founding Byrds members Gene Clark and Michael Clarke that also included former Flying Burrito Brothers and Firefall member Rick Roberts, former Beach Boys guitarist Blondie Chaplin and 1968-1969 Byrds bassist John York. Several concert promoters began to shorten the band's name to "The Byrds" in advertisements and promotional material. As the band continued to tour in 1985, their agent decided to shorten the name to "The Byrds" permanently, eliciting displeasure from co-founders Roger McGuinn, David Crosby and Chris Hillman. Although Michael Clarke continued working with a similar group, Clark heeded their complaints and folded the group.

Throughout this period, Manuel continued to participate in several projects in addition to his road work, including the recording of the Ethiopian famine relief charity single "Tears Are Not Enough" by the ad hoc Canadian supergroup Northern Lights. The song was eventually included on the We Are the World album. Along with Hudson on keyboards, Manuel also contributed background vocals to Tom Petty and the Heartbreakers's "Best of Everything" (co-produced by Robertson) on Southern Accents.

In a March 1985 interview with Ruth Albert Spencer of the Woodstock Times, Manuel expressed equivocation toward The Band's professional direction at a time when the group was relegated to playing theaters and clubs as headliners and support slots in larger venues for onetime peers such as the Grateful Dead and Crosby, Stills and Nash: "I sobered up and I pay a lot closer attention when I realize what we threw away. We didn't really throw it away, we benched it and in just this last year and a half I've seen millions of dollars go by ... doors open but we haven't taken advantage of it".

=== Death ===
On March 4, 1986, after a gig by The Band at the Cheek to Cheek Lounge in Winter Park, Florida (a suburb of Orlando, Florida), Manuel died by suicide. He had appeared to be in relatively good spirits at the concert but ominously "thanked [Hudson] profusely for twenty-five years of good music and appreciation" as the latter musician packed his keyboards and synthesizers to be shipped to the next venue after the show. Danko, who also struggled with substance abuse, confronted Manuel about his alcohol use after the show. The Band eventually returned to the Quality Inn, and Manuel talked with Helm about music, people, and film in Helm's room. According to Helm, at around 2:30 in the morning, Manuel said he needed to get something from his room. Upon returning to his room, he woke his wife, Arlie, who observed that Manuel "was all pissed off about something"; Manuel claimed that his frustration stemmed from the quality of the piano at the venue. When Arlie enjoined him to come to bed, he joined her with his clothes on. After she resumed sleeping, it is believed that he finished one last bottle of Grand Marnier before hanging himself in the bathroom sometime before 3:30. She discovered her husband's body along with the depleted bottle of liqueur and a small amount of cocaine the following morning. He was buried a week later at the Avondale Cemetery in his hometown of Stratford, Ontario. At his memorial service in Woodstock, Danko sang one of Manuel's most famous covers, Bob Dylan's "I Shall Be Released" accompanied by the church's pipe organ and the other attendees.

At the end of March, Danko declared, "I can't believe in a million years that he meant for that to happen. There was just no sign ... I have to think this was just a goddamned silly accident." A blood toxicology report indicated that Manuel was drunk and had ingested cocaine within 12 to 24 hours of his death.

In 2004, the city of Stratford honored Manuel with a sidewalk star in the busy tourist section of Ontario Street. There is also a memorial bench seated next to the Avon River dedicated in his honor.

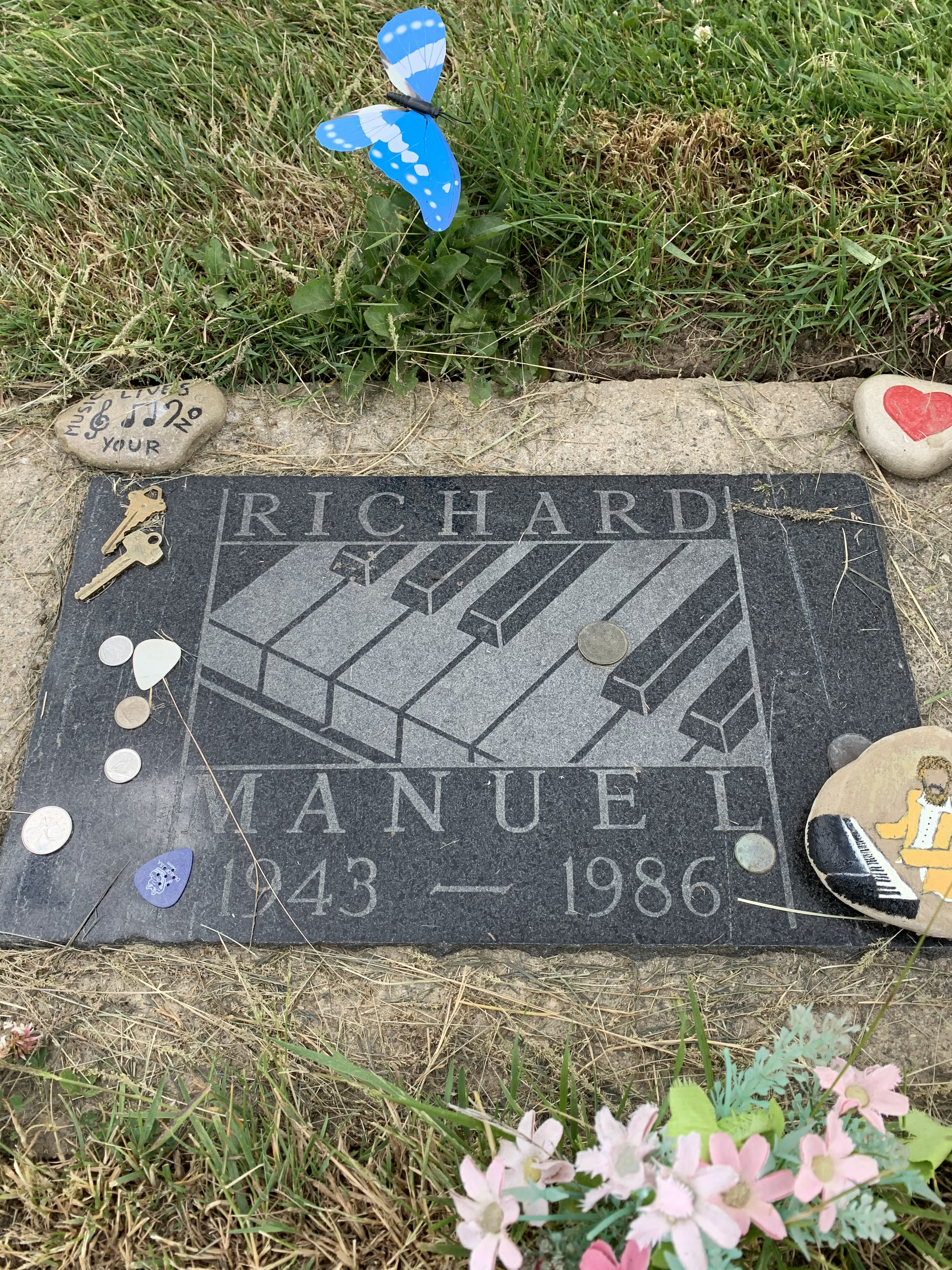
Richard Manuel's gravesite at Avondale Cemetery, June 27, 2020

== Posthumous recognition ==
Although Manuel died before The Band recorded their final three albums, two songs featuring him on lead vocals, recorded in the 1980s, were included on the first two of these albums: "Country Boy," on Jericho (1993), and "She Knows," on High on the Hog (1996).

In 2002, the Japanese label Dreamsville Records released Whispering Pines: Live at the Getaway, which contains selections from a solo performance by Manuel at The Getaway in October 1985.

Robbie Robertson's "Fallen Angel" (1987), Ronnie Hawkins's "Days Gone By" (1995) and The Band's "Too Soon Gone" (1993) are all tributes to Manuel.

Eric Clapton's 1986 album, August, features his tribute to Manuel, entitled "Holy Mother." The San Francisco–area group The Call, who had collaborated with Hudson and Robertson, dedicated the video for their 1986 single "Everywhere I Go" to Manuel. Counting Crows recorded the song "If I Could Give All My Love (Richard Manuel Is Dead)," released on their 2002 album Hard Candy. The Drive-By Truckers' song "Danko/Manuel" was released on their album The Dirty South in 2004.

Head of Femur included "Song for Richard Manuel" on their 2005 release, Hysterical Stars. In 2008, the Michigan roots quartet Steppin' In It released the album Simple Tunes for Troubled Times, which contains the song "The Ghost of Richard Manuel," while Isaac Gillespie's album 1971 features "Richard Manuel the Pacifier." Ray Lamontagne referred to the singer during his performance on the BBC program Songwriter's Circle. In 2012 Black Prairie released A Tear in the Eye Is a Wound in the Heart, which includes the song "Richard Manuel". Steppin' In It's 2008 album, "Simple Tunes For Troubled Times" includes the song "The Ghost of Richard Manuel." In a 2016 interview on his "WTF" podcast, Marc Maron and Roger Waters discussed their mutual love for The Band, with Waters ruminating on the beauty of Manuel's voice.

In 2025, author Stephen T. Lewis released the first official biography of Richard Manuel, Richard Manuel: His Life and Music, from the Hawks and Bob Dylan to The Band.

== Awards and Honours ==
- Canadian Music Hall of Fame - posthumously inducted as a member of The Band in 1989.
- Rock and Roll Hall of Fame - posthumously inducted as a member of The Band in 1994.
- City Of Stratford, Ontario - laid a bronze star plaque in Richard's honour in 2004, named a street after him in the 2010s, and marked Manuel's old home with a plaque in 2022.
- New York Blues Hall Of Fame - posthumously inducted in 2015.

== Discography ==
- Whispering Pines: Live at the Getaway (2002)
- Live at O'Tooles Tavern (2009; recorded live in Scranton, Pennsylvania, on December 12, 1985)
- Live at the Lone Star (2011; recorded live in New York City in 1984)

== Bibliography ==
- Helm, Levon and Davis, Stephen (1993). This Wheel's on Fire, A Cappella Books, ISBN 1-55652-405-6
- Levin, Martin, (1996) The Lonesome Death of Richard Manuel: The Day the Music Died. Toronto Life.
- Lewis, Stephen T. (2025) Richard Manuel, Schiffer Publishing, ISBN 978-0-7643-6924-7
