= Ian Tyson =

Canadian singer-songwriter (1933–2022)

Ian Tyson CM AOE
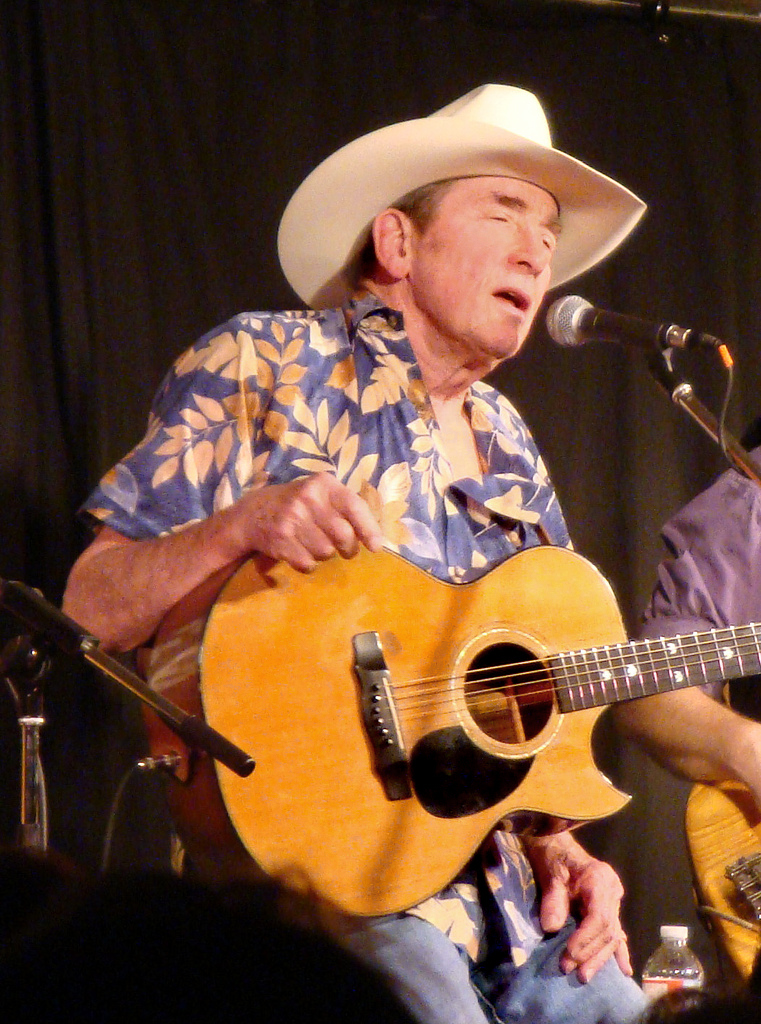
- Tyson in 2010
- Born: Ian Dawson Tyson; 25 September 1933; Victoria, British Columbia, Canada
- Died: 29 December 2022 (aged 89); Longview, Alberta, Canada
- Education: Vancouver School of Art
- Spouses: Sylvia Fricker (m. 1964–1975) Twylla Dvorkin (m. 1986–2008)
- Children: 2
- Musical career
- Origin: Toronto. Ontario, Canada
- Genres: Country; folk; Western; Americana
- Occupations: Singer; songwriter; producer; author
- Instruments: Vocals; guitar
- Years active: 1959–2022
- Labels: Stony Plain, A&M
- Formerly of: Ian & Sylvia, Great Speckled Bird

Ian Dawson Tyson CM AOE (25 September 1933 – 29 December 2022) was a Canadian singer-songwriter who wrote many folk and cowboy songs, including "Four Strong Winds" and "Someday Soon", and performed with partner Sylvia Tyson as the duo Ian & Sylvia. as well as a solo act after the duo split up in 1975.

== Early life and education ==
Ian Dawson Tyson was born on 25 September 1933, in Victoria, British Columbia, to George and Margaret Tyson. His father George was an insurance salesman and polo enthusiast who emigrated from England in 1906. Growing up in Duncan, British Columbia, he learned to ride horses on his father's farm, and eventually became a rodeo rider in his late teens and early twenties. He took up the guitar while in hospital recovering from a broken ankle sustained in a rodeo accident. Fellow Canadian country artist Wilf Carter was a musical influence. He graduated from the Vancouver School of Art in 1958.

== Career ==
After graduation, Tyson moved to Toronto where he began a job as a commercial artist. There he performed in local clubs and in 1959 began to sing on occasion with Sylvia Fricker. By early 1959, Tyson and Fricker were performing part-time at the Village Corner as Ian & Sylvia. The pair became a full-time musical act in 1961 and married three years later. In 1969, they formed and fronted the group The Great Speckled Bird. Residing in southern Alberta, the Tysons toured all over the world. During their years together, the pair released 13 albums of folk and country music.

From 1970 to 1975, Tyson hosted a national television program, The Ian Tyson Show, on CTV, known as Nashville North in its first season. Sylvia Tyson and the Great Speckled Bird appeared often in the series.

In 1980, Tyson became associated with Calgary music manager and producer Neil MacGonigill. Tyson decided to concentrate on country and cowboy music, resulting in the well-received 1983 album Old Corrals and Sagebrush, released on Columbia Records.

In 1989, Tyson was inducted into the Canadian Country Music Hall of Fame. His next albums were cowboy music: I Outgrew the Wagon (1989), And Stood There Amazed (1991), and Eighteen Inches of Rain (1994). Tyson credited Adrian Chornowol with creating a unique sound for his platinum album "Cowboyography", a unique style that he maintained for the rest of his recording career.

In 2005, CBC Radio One listeners chose his song "Four Strong Winds" as the greatest Canadian song of all time on the series 50 Tracks: The Canadian Version. There was strong momentum for him to be nominated the Greatest Canadian, but he fell short. He has been a strong influence on many Canadian artists, including Neil Young, who recorded "Four Strong Winds" for Comes a Time (1978). Johnny Cash would also record the same song for American V: A Hundred Highways (2006). Judy Collins recorded a version of his song "Someday Soon" in 1968.

Bob Dylan and the Band recorded his song "One Single River" in Woodstock, New York, in 1967. The recording can be found on the unreleased Genuine Basement Tapes, vol. I.

In 2006, Tyson sustained irreversible scarring to his vocal cords as a result of a concert at the Havelock Country Jamboree followed a year later by a virus contracted during a flight to Denver. This resulted in a notable loss of the vocal quality and range he was known for; he has self-described his new sound as "gravelly". Notwithstanding, he released the album From Yellowhead to Yellowstone and Other Love Stories in 2008 to high critical praise. He was nominated for a 2009 Canadian Folk Music Award for Solo Artist of the Year. The album includes a song about Canadian hockey broadcasting icon Don Cherry and the passing of his wife, Rose, a rare Tyson cover written by Toronto songwriter Jay Aymar.

Ian Tyson talks about The Long Trail on Bookbits radio

Sylvia joined Ian to sing their signature song, "Four Strong Winds", at the 50th anniversary of the Mariposa Folk Festival on 11 July 2010, in Orillia, Ontario.

Tyson also wrote a book of young adult fiction about his song "La Primera", called La Primera: The Story of Wild Mustangs.

== Personal life ==
Tyson's first marriage, to his musical partner Sylvia Fricker, ended in an amicable divorce in 1975. Their son Clay (Clayton Dawson Tyson, born 1966) was also a musical performer and has since moved to a career modifying racing bikes.

After the divorce, Tyson returned to southern Alberta to farm and train horses but also continued his musical career on a limited basis. In 1978, Neil Young recorded "Four Strong Winds", and Tyson used the royalties for a down payment on a cattle and horse ranch. He started playing regularly at Calgary's Ranchman's Club around this time.

Tyson's autobiography, The Long Trail: My Life in the West, was published in 2010. Co-written with Calgary journalist Jeremy Klaszus, the book "alternates between autobiography and a broader study of [Tyson's] relationship to the 'West' – both as a fading reality and a cultural ideal." CBC's Michael Enright said the book is like Tyson himself – "straightforward, unglazed and honest."

Ian Tyson married Twylla Dvorkin in 1986. Their daughter Adelita Rose was born c. 1987. Tyson's second marriage ended in divorce in early 2008, several years after he and Dvorkin had separated.

A book by John Einarson, Four Strong Winds: Ian & Sylvia, was published in 2012. A few years later, Ian said that Evinia Pulos (Bruce) was his "soulmate"; since she lived in Kelowna, a city in south central British Columbia, he said that he was unable to see her often. "We've been lovers for 55 years. ... How many people can say that?" Tyson said. In 2018, Tyson made concert appearances in British Columbia and Alberta. His website indicated that in 2019, he was to make two concert appearances, one in Calgary and the other in Bragg Creek, Alberta.

=== Death ===
Tyson died at his ranch near Longview, Alberta, on 29 December 2022, at the age of 89. According to his manager Paul Mascioli, this followed several health issues, including a heart attack and open heart surgery in 2015.

== Awards and recognition ==
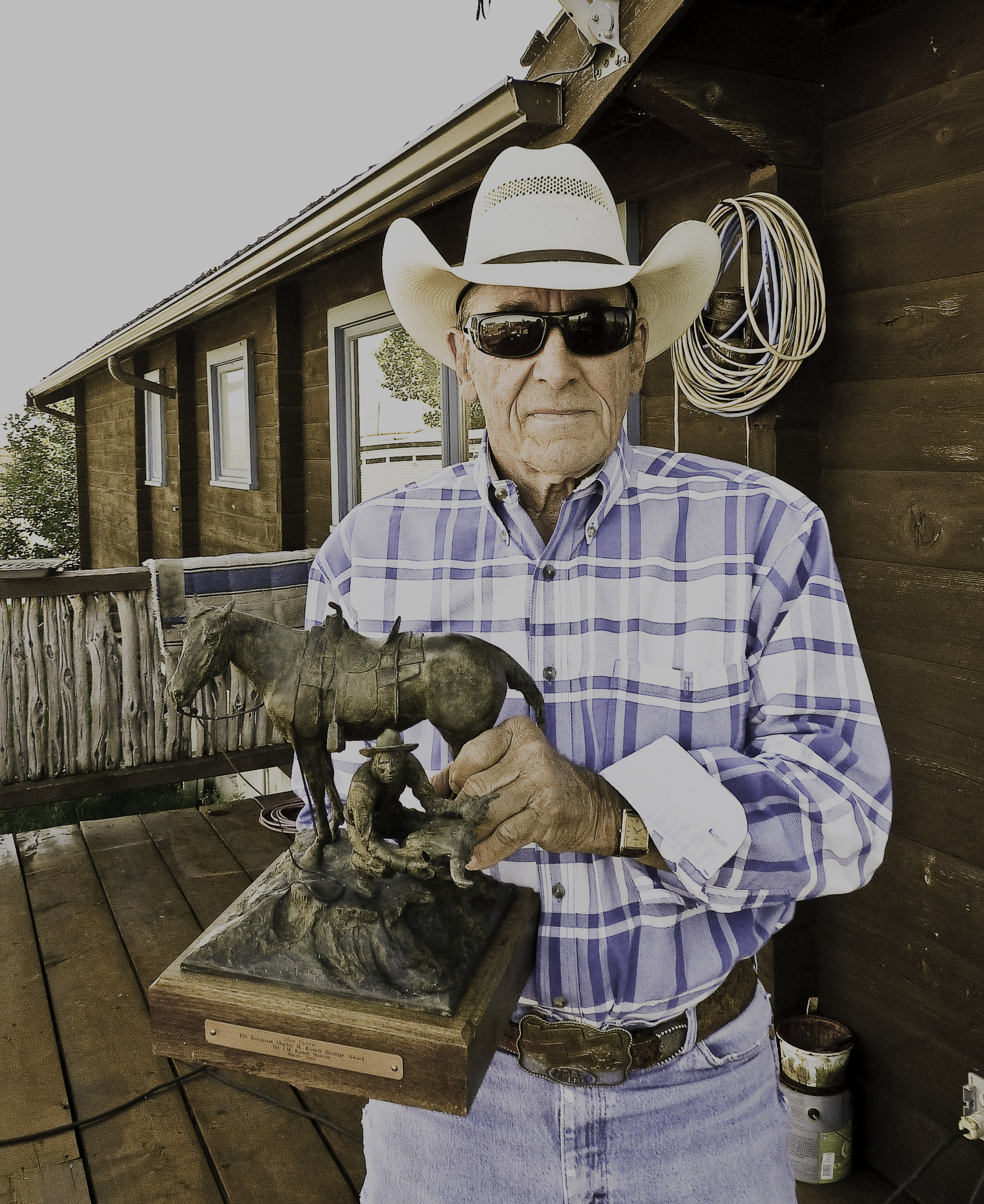
Tyson with the 2011 Charles M. Russell Heritage Award

Tyson became a Member of the Order of Canada in October 1994 and was inducted into the Alberta Order of Excellence in 2006. In 2003, Tyson received a Governor General's Performing Arts Award.

Tyson's 1987 album, Cowboyography, contained two songs that were later chosen by the Western Writers of America as among the Top 100 Western Songs of all time: "Navajo Rug" and "Summer Wages".

He was inducted into the Canadian Music Hall of Fame, with Sylvia, in 1992.

Ian Tyson was inducted into the Mariposa Hall of Fame, with Sylvia, in 2006.

He was inducted into the Canadian Country Music Hall of Fame in 1989. (Sylvia Tyson was inducted in 2003.)

The song "Four Strong Winds", written by Ian Tyson, was named as the greatest Canadian song of all time by the CBC-Radio program 50 Tracks: The Canadian Version in 2005.

An announcement in July 2019 stated that Ian Tyson and Sylvia Tyson would be inducted into the Songwriters Hall of Fame, individually, not as a duo. The Canadian Broadcasting Corporation article stated that "the duo's 1964's hit, 'Four Strong Winds', has been deemed one of the most influential songs in Canadian history". The report also referenced the song "You Were on My Mind", written by Sylvia Tyson, as well as her four albums (1975–1980).

=== Tribute recordings ===
A tribute CD to Ian Tyson, The Gift, was released in 2007 on Stony Plain Records featuring "Someday Soon" done by Doug Andrew with Buddy Cage on pedal steel guitar (Buddy played in Great Speckled Bird), "Four Strong Winds" recorded by Blue Rodeo, plus another 13 of Tyson's best known songs done by major folk and country artists. The album is titled after a song of Tyson's, which itself is a tribute to Charles Marion Russell.

== Discography ==
=== Albums ===
Year	Title	Peak positions		Certifications
Year	Title	CAN Country	CAN	Certifications
1973	Ol' Eon	—	81	
1978	One Jump Ahead of the Devil	—	—	
1983	Old Corrals and Sagebrush	—	—	
1984	Ian Tyson	—	—	
1987	Cowboyography	—	—	CAN: Platinum
1989	I Outgrew the Wagon	12	74	CAN: Gold
1991	And Stood There Amazed	16	—	
1994	Eighteen Inches of Rain	9	—	
1996	All the Good 'Uns	21	—	CAN: Gold
1999	Lost Herd	—	—	
2002	Live at Longview	—	—	
2005	Songs from the Gravel Road	—	—	
2008	Yellowhead to Yellowstone and Other Love Stories	—	—	
2011	Songs from the Stone House	—	—	
2012	Raven Singer	—	—	
2013	All the Good 'Uns Vol. 2	—	—	
2015	Carnero Vaquero	—	—	
"—" denotes releases that did not chart

=== Singles ===
Year	Title	Peak positions			Album
Year	Title	CAN Country	CAN	CAN AC	Album
1973	"Love Can Bless the Soul of Anyone"	—	61	46	Ol' Eon
1974	"If She Just Helps Me"	31	—	—	Ol' Eon
1974	"Great Canadian Tour"	—	—	13	Ol' Eon
1974	"She's My Greatest Blessing"	—	—	—	Ol' Eon
1974	"Some Kind of Fool"	—	—	—	Ol' Eon
1975	"Goodness of Shirley"	34	—	—	Goldenrod soundtrack
1979	"Half a Mile of Hell"	26	—	—	One Jump Ahead of the Devil
1980	"The Moondancer"	19	—	—	Non-album single
1983	"Alberta's Child"	—	—	—	Old Corrals and Sagebrush
1984	"Oklahoma Hills"	40	—	—	Ian Tyson
1987	"Cowboy Pride"	9	—	—	Cowboyography
1987	"Navajo Rug"	—	—	—	Cowboyography
1987	"The Gift"	17	—	—	Cowboyography
1988	"Fifty Years Ago"	8	—	—	Cowboyography
1989	"Irving Berlin (Is 100 Yrs Old Today)"	24	—	—	I Outgrew the Wagon
1989	"Cowboys Don't Cry"	25	—	—	I Outgrew the Wagon
1989	"Adelita Rose"	23	—	—	I Outgrew the Wagon
1990	"Casey Tibbs"	29	—	—	I Outgrew the Wagon
1990	"Since the Rain"	17	—	—	I Outgrew the Wagon
1990	"I Outgrew the Wagon"	33	—	—	I Outgrew the Wagon
1991	"Springtime in Alberta"	9	—	—	And Stood There Amazed
1991	"Black Nights"	35	—	—	And Stood There Amazed
1992	"Lights of Laramie"	9	—	—	And Stood There Amazed
1992	"Magpie"	43	—	—	And Stood There Amazed
1992	"You're Not Alone Anymore"	47	—	—	And Stood There Amazed
1993	"Jaquima to Freno"	30	—	—	And Stood There Amazed
1994	"Alcohol in the Bloodstream"	9	—	—	Eighteen Inches of Rain
1994	"Eighteen Inches of Rain"	27	—	—	Eighteen Inches of Rain
1994	"Heartaches Are Stealin'"	39	—	—	Eighteen Inches of Rain
1995	"Horsethief Moon"	68	—	—	Eighteen Inches of Rain
1996	"Barrel Racing Angel"	35	—	—	All the Good 'uns
1997	"The Wonder of It All"	—	—	—	All the Good 'uns
1999	"Brahmas and Mustangs"	—	—	—	Lost Herd
2005	"Land of Shining Mountains"	—	—	—	Songs from the Gravel Road
2005	"This Is My Sky"	—	—	—	Songs from the Gravel Road
2006	"Always Saying Goodbye"	—	—	—	Songs from the Gravel Road
"—" denotes releases that did not chart

== Videography ==
Year	Title	Notes	Ref
1971–1974	Ian Tyson Show	CTV network	
2010	Songs from the Gravel Road	Bravo! Network documentary	
2010	Mano a Mano	DVD with Tom Russell	
2010	This Is My Sky	DVD set	
