= Ian & Sylvia =

Canadian musical duo

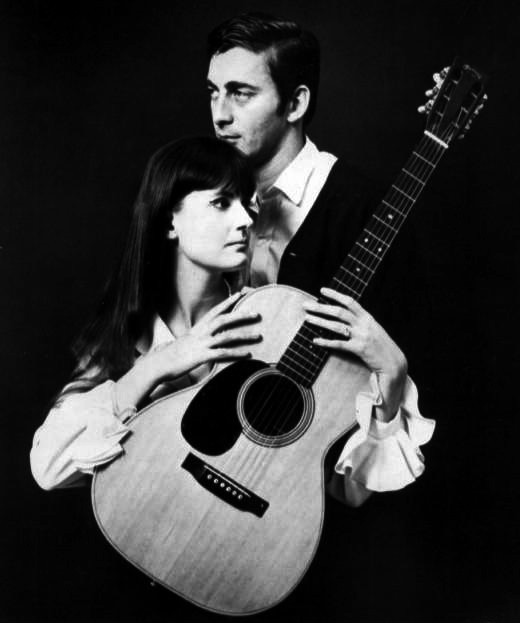

Background information
- Origin: Toronto, Ontario, Canada
- Genres: Folk, country, country rock
- Years active: 1959–1975
- Labels: Vanguard; MGM; Columbia
- Past members: Ian Tyson; Sylvia Tyson

Ian & Sylvia were a Canadian folk and country music duo that consisted of Ian and Sylvia Tyson. They began performing together in 1959 (full-time in 1961), married in 1964, and divorced and stopped performing together in 1975.

== History ==
=== Early lives ===
Ian Tyson, CM, AOE was born in Victoria, British Columbia in 1933. In his teens, he decided upon a career as a rodeo rider. Recovering from injuries sustained from a fall during the mid-1950s, he started learning guitar. In the late 1950s, he relocated to Toronto, aspiring to a career as a commercial artist. He also started playing clubs and coffeehouses in Toronto. By 1959, he was performing music as a full-time occupation.

Sylvia Tyson, née Fricker, CM, was born in Chatham, Ontario, in 1940. While still in her teens, she started frequenting the folk clubs of Toronto.

=== Career ===
==== Folk duo ====
The two started performing together in Toronto in 1959. By 1962, they were living in New York City, where they caught the attention of manager Albert Grossman, who managed Peter, Paul and Mary and would soon become Bob Dylan's manager. Grossman secured them a contract with Vanguard Records and they released their first album late in the year.

Their first album, Ian & Sylvia, on Vanguard Records, consists mainly of traditional songs. There were British and Canadian folk songs, spiritual music, and a few blues songs thrown into the mix. The album was moderately successful and they made the list of performers for the 1963 Newport Folk Festival.

Four Strong Winds, their second album, was similar to the first, with the exception of the inclusion of the early Bob Dylan song "Tomorrow Is a Long Time" and the title song "Four Strong Winds", written by Ian Tyson. "Four Strong Winds" was a major hit in Canada and ensured their stardom. Years later, the song was named as the greatest Canadian song of all time by the CBC-Radio program 50 Tracks: The Canadian Version.

The two married in June 1964; they also released their third album, Northern Journey, that year. It included a song written by Sylvia, titled "You Were on My Mind", recorded by both the California group We Five (a 1965 No. 4 on the RPM chart, No. 1 on the Cashbox chart, No. 3 on the Billboard Hot 100) and British folk rock singer Crispian St. Peters (No. 29 on the RPM chart, No. 36 in 1967). A recording of "Four Strong Winds" by Bobby Bare made it to No. 3 on the country charts around that time.

On the Northern Journey album was the song "Someday Soon", a song by Ian Tyson that would rival "Four Strong Winds" in its popularity. (Both songs would eventually be recorded by dozens of singers.)

Their fourth album, Early Morning Rain, consisted in large part of new songs. They introduced the work of the couple's fellow Canadian songwriter and performer Gordon Lightfoot through the title song and "(That's What You Get) For Lovin' Me". They also included the first recording of the song "Darcy Farrow" by Steve Gillette and Tom Campbell, as well as a number of their own compositions.

They performed at the 1965 Newport Folk Festival. Play One More, their offering of 1965, showed a move toward the electrified folk-like music that was becoming popular with groups like the Byrds and the Lovin' Spoonful. The title tune used horns to evoke the mariachi style.

In 1967, they released two albums, one recorded for Vanguard, the other for MGM. These two efforts, So Much For Dreaming and Lovin' Sound, were far less dynamic presentations.

From 1970 to 1975, Ian Tyson hosted The Ian Tyson Show on CTV, known as Nashville North in its first season. Sylvia Tyson and the Great Speckled Bird appeared often on the series.

==== Country rock ====
They moved to Nashville, Tennessee, where they recorded two albums; one to fulfill the terms of their Vanguard contract, the other to supply MGM with a second (and last) album for that label. The albums can be defined as early country rock music; Nashville for Vanguard was cut in February 1968, one month before the Byrds' Sweetheart of the Rodeo, widely considered the first collaboration of rock and Nashville players. Three of Bob Dylan's Basement Tapes songs are included on their Nashville albums; most of the rest were written by Ian or Sylvia.

In 1969, Ian & Sylvia formed the country rock group Great Speckled Bird. In addition to participating in the cross-Canada rock-and-roll rail tour Festival Express, they recorded the album Great Speckled Bird for the short-lived Ampex label. Produced by Todd Rundgren, the record failed when Ampex was unable to establish widespread distribution. Thousands of copies never left the warehouse, and it has become a much sought-after collector's item. Initially, the album artist was given as Great Speckled Bird but later copies had a sticker saying that it featured the duo.

Ian & Sylvia's last two albums were recorded on Columbia Records. The first, 1971's Ian and Sylvia (not to be confused with their 1962 self-titled release) consists largely of mainstream country-flavored songs. This album was released on CD, with extra tracks, as The Beginning of the End in 1996. Their second Columbia record, 1972's You Were on My Mind, featured a later incarnation of Great Speckled Bird. The songs range from hard country rock to middle-of-the-road country material. Neither of the Columbia albums sold well. They were eventually combined and released as 1974's The Best of Ian and Sylvia.

In 1972, Ian & Sylvia performed the song "Let Her Alone" for Walt Disney Productions' live-action drama Run, Cougar, Run. Ian also served as the film's narrator.

By 1975, Ian & Sylvia had stopped performing together and soon afterwards were divorced. Their final appearance as a duo was in May 1975 at the Horseshoe Tavern in Toronto.

=== Post-divorce ===
After their marriage ended in 1975, Ian returned to Southern Alberta to farm and train horses, but continued his musical career. His autobiography The Long Trail: My Life in the West was published in 2010.

Sylvia wrote, performed, and involved herself in various projects. In recent years, she has been recording new material, working as a member of the group Quartette, and performing a one-woman show titled River Road and Other Stories.

The duo's son, Clay Tyson (Clayton Dawson Tyson, born 1966), is also a musician and recording artist.

On August 16, 1986, folk singers who had recorded or written Ian and Sylvia songs, reunited for a concert that was filmed for the CBC. The group at the Kingswood Music Theatre in Maple, Ontario included Gordon Lightfoot, Judy Collins, Emmylou Harris, and Murray McLauchlan.

Ian & Sylvia sang their signature song "Four Strong Winds" at the 50th anniversary of the Mariposa Folk Festival on July 11, 2010, in Orillia, Ontario.

== Honours ==
In 1992, they were inducted into the Canadian Music Hall of Fame.

In 1994, they were both made Members of the Order of Canada.

In 2005, an extensive Canadian Broadcasting Corporation poll on the CBC-Radio program 50 Tracks: The Canadian Version named "Four Strong Winds" to be the greatest Canadian song of all time. Artists Neil Young, Johnny Cash, Sarah McLachlan, Harry Belafonte, and Bob Dylan recorded this song.

In 2006, they were both inducted into the Mariposa Hall of Fame; the duo performed a song together at that time, long after they had gone their separate ways. Back in 1961, Ian and Sylvia had headlined at the Mariposa Folk Festival.

In a poll of the Western Writers of America, two Ian & Sylvia songs, "Someday Soon" and "Summer Wages" (both written by Tyson), were selected among the "Top 100 Western Songs" of all time.

Ian Tyson was inducted into the Canadian Country Music Hall of Fame in 1989. Sylvia Tyson was inducted in 2003.

In July 2019, it was announced that Ian Tyson and Sylvia Tyson would be inducted into the Canadian Songwriters Hall of Fame individually, not as a duo. The Canadian Broadcasting Corporation stated that their 1964 hit "Four Strong Winds" "has been deemed one of the most influential songs in Canadian history". The report also referenced the song "You Were on My Mind", written by Sylvia Tyson, as well as her four albums from 1975 to 1980.

== Discography ==
=== Albums ===
Year	Album	Chart Positions		Label
Year	Album	CAN	US	Label
1962	Ian & Sylvia	—	—	Vanguard
1963	Four Strong Winds	—	115	Vanguard
1964	Northern Journey	—	70	Vanguard
1965	Early Morning Rain	—	77	Vanguard
1966	Play One More	—	142	Vanguard
1967	So Much for Dreaming	—	130	Vanguard
1967	Lovin' Sound	—	148	MGM
1968	Nashville	—	—	Vanguard
1968	Full Circle	48	—	MGM
1970	Great Speckled Bird	54	—	Ampex
1971	Ian and Sylvia	60	201	Columbia
1972	You Were on My Mind	—	—	Columbia
1996	Live at Newport	—	—	Vanguard

(Canadian album charts did not start until 1967)

=== Singles ===
Year	Single	Chart Positions			Album
Year	Single	CAN AC	CAN	US	Album
1963	"Four Strong Winds"	—	9	—	Four Strong Winds
1965	"Early Morning Rain"	1	—	—	Early Morning Rain
1967	"Lovin' Sound"	—	—	101	Lovin' Sound
1971	"Creators of Rain"	—	73	—	Ian & Sylvia
1971	"More Often Than Not"	22	—	—	Ian & Sylvia
1972	"You Were on My Mind" (re-issue)	4	—	—	You Were on My Mind

== See also ==
- Music of Canada
- Canadian Music Hall of Fame
