= Great Speckled Bird (band) =

Country rock group

- Also known as: The Great Speckled Bird
- Origin: Toronto, Ontario, Canada
- Genres: Country rock
- Years active: 1969–1976
- Labels: Ampex, Columbia, A&M, Stony Plain
- Past members: Ian Tyson; Sylvia Tyson; Amos Garrett; Ken Kalmusky; Bill Keith; Ricky Marcus; Buddy Cage; N. D. Smart; Jim Colegrove; Jeff Gutcheon; David Wilcox; Douglas Arden Innis; Ben Keith; Peter Ecklund; Billy Mundi; Red Shea; Gordon Fleming; Jim Baker; Pee Wee Charles; Rolly Sally; Jim Morgan; Ed Wideman; Kim Brandt; Gord Neave

Great Speckled Bird was a country rock group formed in 1969 by the Canadian musical duo Ian & Sylvia. Ian Tyson sang, played guitar and composed. Sylvia Tyson sang, composed and occasionally played piano. The other founding members were Amos Garrett on guitar and occasional vocals, Ben Keith on steel guitar, Ken Kalmusky on bass and Ricky Marcus on drums. They were named after the song, "The Great Speckled Bird", as recorded by Roy Acuff (1936).

== Career ==
The group was featured in the film Festival Express, a documentary about the music festival of the same name that took place in 1970. The shows were scheduled, and the performers traveled by train, across Canada. In the film, Great Speckled Bird performs "C.C. Rider", along with Delaney Bramlett and members of the Grateful Dead. A performance of the Dylan/Manuel song "Tears of Rage", without the aforementioned accompaniment, is included in the extra features of the DVD release.

In 1970, the group became the house band for the television show Nashville North, produced by the CTV network and filmed at the CFTO-TV studios in Toronto, which, after one season, became the Ian Tyson Show. The show ran until 1975.

The group backed Ian & Sylvia until the duo parted ways in 1975. They also backed Ian Tyson as a solo artist, for his 1973 debut solo album and his live performances, until 1976.

== Discography ==
=== Albums ===
Year	Album	Album Artist	CAN	Label
1970	Great Speckled Bird	Great Speckled Bird	54	Ampex
1972	You Were on My Mind	Ian & Sylvia and The Great Speckled Bird		Columbia
1973	Ol' Eon	Ian Tyson	81	A&M

=== Singles ===
Year	Single	Chart Positions			Album
Year	Single	CAN Country	CAN AC	CAN	Album
1970	"Trucker's Cafe"	9		94	Great Speckled Bird
1972	"You Were on My Mind"		4		You Were on My Mind
1973	"Love Can Bless the Soul of Anyone"		46	61	Ol' Eon
1974	"Great Canadian Tour"		13		Ol' Eon

== Videography ==
Year	Title	Notes
1970	The Johnny Cash Show	performed "Crazy Arms" and "Long Long Time to Get Old"
1970	Nashville North	produced by the CTV network
1971–1975	The Ian Tyson Show	produced by the CTV network
2003	Festival Express	filmed in 1970

== See also ==
- Country rock
- Amos Garrett

== Bibliography ==
- J. Einarson, I. Tyson, S. Tyson. Four Strong Winds: Ian and Sylvia. 2011. McClelland & Stewart Ltd. ISBN 978-0-7710-3038-3. retrieved 2011-09-13.
