= Tiffany Shade =

American rock band (1966–1968)

- Origin: Cleveland, Ohio, United States
- Genres: Psychedelic rock
- Years active: 1966-1968
- Labels: Mainstream
- Members: Bob Leonard; Mike Barnes; Barrow Davidian; Rick Hohn; Robb Clarke-Murphy; Tom Schuster

Tiffany Shade was an American psychedelic rock band formed in 1966 in Cleveland, Ohio. They broke up in 1968. They recorded and released one self-titled LP in December, 1967 and two singles from the same album on the Mainstream label in early 1968 prior to their demise.

== History ==
Tiffany Shade was formed by keyboardist Bob Leonard (born May 27, 1945), Folk Guitarist/vocalist Mike Barnes (born May 21, 1948), 12-string guitarist/vocalist Barow Davidian (Barow James Davidian, November 8, 1945 – September 23, 1997), bassist Rick Hohn, later replaced by bassist Robb Clarke-Murphy (September 26, 1944 – September 3, 2010) and drummer Tom Schuster (Thomas Charles Schuster Jr., February 1, 1949 – October 21, 2011).

On March 2, 1968, Tiffany Shade appeared at the Grande Ballroom in Detroit on the same bill as Big Brother and the Holding Company, the MC5 and the Pink Peech Mob. They also appeared at the Grande Ballroom again on April 5, 1968, along with The Troggs and the MC5. After Tiffany Shade album's release, the band made numerous appearances in their hometown of Cleveland, Ohio and at the Sugarbush ski resort in Warren, Vermont before disbanding in late 1968.

After the band's breakup, keyboardist Bob Leonard went on to play with Mink DeVille appearing on the band's 1978 debut LP, Cabretta, and touring Europe to support the release. Leonard also appeared on Mink DeVille's 1979 album Return to Magenta.

=== Recordings ===
The group recorded one album and two singles for Jazz Producer Bob Shad's Mainstream label. (US LP Release info: Mainstream S/T 56015, Stereo S/6105. UK LP release info: Fontana TL 5469). Both the US and UK platters were released in 1968. The Mainstream label also issued two Singles: "Would You Take My Mind Out For a Walk" / "One Good Reason" released as Mainstream 677 in 1968 & "An Older Man"/ "Sam" released as Mainstream 680 also released in 1968).

Shads' Mainstream label was home to many other psychedelic bands in the late 1960s including Janis Joplin's first band Big Brother and the Holding Company (Mainstream S/6099 released in 1967), The Tangerine Zoo (Mainstream S/6107), Ellie Pop (Mainstream S/6115), The Superfine Dandelion (Mainstream S/6102), The Growing Concern (Mainstream S/6108) and The Amboy Dukes (band).

According to band member Mike Barnes, Tiffany Shade album, like most Bob Shad produced/Mainstream releases, was not promoted very well and the band and the LP faded from the scene with very little fanfare. Today, the original LP can fetch as much as $150 to $300 at auction in mint condition.

The Mainstream catalog has since been handed down to Bob Shads' children and several titles from the Mainstream catalog have recently been reissued on 180 gram vinyl. The 10 songs from Tiffany Shade LP are available on iTunes but according to sources, most notably the songs' authors themselves, the songwriters are not receiving any royalties for these re-issues or downloads. In fact Michael Barnes and Robert Leonard were not even cognizant of the fact that their material was being sold until it was mentioned to them. Most likely, like most young bands of the day, Barnes and Leonard signed away all rights to any royalties or monetary gains in exchange for Mainstream releasing the LP. As bassist Robb Clark Murphy recalls "we never saw any money for that LP. Basically right before we were about to begin recording in the studio, Shad laid out a contract in front of us and told us to sign. We didn't want to lose our opportunity to record so we signed away all of our rights."

== Discography ==
Album

- Tiffany Shade (Dec 11, 1967). Track listing:
  - Would You Take My Mind Out for a Walk (Michael Barnes)
  - An Older Man (Robert Leonard-Michael Barnes)
  - Sam (Robert Leonard)
  - Jaguar City Blues (Rob Murphy-Robert Leonard)
  - A Very Grand Love (Robert Leonard)
  - Come Softly to me (Gretchen Christopher-Barbara Ellis-Gary Troxel)
  - No Reality (Michael Barnes)
  - One Good Reason (Michael Barnes-Robert Leonard)
  - A Quiet Revolution (Michael Barnes)
  - Not Worth the Pain (Michael Barnes)

Singles

- Would You Take My Mind Out for a Walk / One Good Reason
- An Older Man / Sam

Note: The song identified on the album's back cover as "Come Softly to Me" (a tune that was written and first recorded by The Fleetwoods) is actually a different song, "Softly to Me," which was first recorded by the band Love and composed by one of that group's members, Bryan MacLean.

== Sources ==
- Colin Dussault interviewed Robert Leonard, Robb Clark Murphy, Michael Barnes, Tom Schuster, Duane Verh, Michael Stanley. Article on Tiffany Shade written by Dussault appeared in the No. 26 Winter/Spring issue of Ugly Things Magazine.
- "The Art of Rock" by Paul D. Grushkin
- "Cleveland-The Rock 'n Roll Connection" by Deanna Adams.

George Shuba (photographer) Art Dussault (bass player for Audi-Badoo)
