= Big Brother & the Holding Company (album) =

Studio album by Big Brother and the Holding Company
- Released: August 23, 1967
- Recorded: December 12–14, 1966, Los Angeles
- Genre: Psychedelic rock
- Length: 23:51
- Label: Mainstream; Columbia
- Producer: Bob Shad

Janis Joplin Big Brother and the Holding Company chronology
Big Brother & the Holding Company (1967)	Cheap Thrills (1968)

Big Brother & the Holding Company is the debut studio album by American rock band Big Brother and the Holding Company, with Janis Joplin, their lead singer. Recorded during three days in December 1966 for Mainstream Records, it was released on August 23, 1967, shortly after the band's major success at the Monterey Pop Festival. Columbia Records took over the band's contract and re-released the album, adding two extra tracks, and putting Joplin's name on the cover. Several tracks on the album were released as singles, the most successful being "Down on Me" on its second release, in 1968.

== Recording ==
The band signed to Bob Shad's local record label Mainstream Records while stranded in Chicago after a promoter ran out of money when their concerts did not attract the expected attendance. Initial recordings took place in Chicago in September 1966, but these were not satisfactory, and the band returned to San Francisco. The band recorded the tracks "Blindman" and "All Is Loneliness" in Los Angeles, and these were released by Mainstream as a single that October, which did not sell well. After playing at a "happening" at Stanford in early December 1966, the band again traveled to Los Angeles to record 10 tracks between 12 and 14 December 1966, produced by Bob Shad.

The band were dissatisfied in the album's sound, with the guitars sounding very clean instead of the raw acid-rock distortion the group would use on stage, and none of the improvisational jamming that was characteristic of the Haight scene. As Sam Andrew later noted, "We were quite disappointed at the time that we could not make the engineer understand what we wanted. He was afraid of the needle going into the red and that is where we wanted the needle to be all the time." Songs like "All Is Loneliness" and "Light Is Faster Than Sound" which were under 3 minutes on the album were often stretched to 10 or more minutes in live performance. Nonetheless, the band were pleased with Joplin's double tracked vocals.

== Release and reception ==
Professional ratings
Review scores
Source	Rating
AllMusic	3/5 stars

The album was released by Mainstream Records in August 1967, shortly after the band's major success at the Monterey Pop Festival. The front cover artwork was designed by Jack Lonshein, while the back cover design was by Dennis Nolan. Two tracks, "Coo Coo" and "The Last Time", were released separately as a single, while the tracks from the previous single, "Blindman" and "All Is Loneliness", were added to the remaining eight tracks. When Columbia took over the band's contract and re-released the album, they included "Coo Coo" and "The Last Time", and put "featuring Janis Joplin" on the cover. The album has been reissued in various formats several times since 1967.

The album was a minor success, peaking at number 60 and almost producing a Top 40 hit a year later (after the success of Cheap Thrills) with the song "Down on Me". In a retrospective review for Allmusic, Joe Viglione feels the production by Bob Shad is weak, though the material and the performances are respectable.

== Track listing ==
1967 Mainstream Records release

Side A
No.	Title	Writer(s)	Length
1.	"Bye, Bye Baby"	Powell St. John	2:37
2.	"Easy Rider"	James Gurley	2:23
3.	"Intruder"	Janis Joplin	2:27
4.	"Light Is Faster Than Sound"	Peter Albin	2:30
5.	"Call on Me"	Sam Andrew	2:32

Side B
No.	Title	Writer(s)	Length
6.	"Women Is Losers"	Janis Joplin	2:03
7.	"Blindman"	Peter Albin, Andrew, David Getz, Gurley, Joplin	2:23
8.	"Down on Me"	Traditional; arranged by Janis Joplin	2:04
9.	"Caterpillar"	Peter Albin	2:18
10.	"All Is Loneliness"	Moondog	2:30

1970 Columbia records release

Side A
No.	Title	Writer(s)	Length
1.	"Bye, Bye Baby"	Powell St. John	2:37
2.	"Easy Rider"	James Gurley	2:23
3.	"Intruder"	Janis Joplin	2:27
4.	"Light Is Faster Than Sound"	Peter Albin	2:30
5.	"Call on Me"	Sam Andrew	2:32
6.	"Coo Coo" (Single)	Traditional; arranged by Peter Albin	1:56

Side B
No.	Title	Writer(s)	Length
7.	"Women Is Losers"	Janis Joplin	2:03
8.	"Blindman"	Peter Albin, Andrew, David Getz, Gurley, Joplin	2:23
9.	"Down on Me"	Traditional; arranged by Janis Joplin	2:04
10.	"Caterpillar"	Peter Albin	2:18
11.	"All Is Loneliness"	Moondog	2:30
12.	"The Last Time" (Single)	Janis Joplin	2:15

1999 Columbia, Legacy release
No.	Title	Writer(s)	Length
1.	"Bye, Bye Baby"	Powell St. John	2:37
2.	"Easy Rider"	James Gurley	2:23
3.	"Intruder"	Janis Joplin	2:27
4.	"Light Is Faster Than Sound"	Peter Albin	2:30
5.	"Call on Me"	Sam Andrew	2:32
6.	"Women Is Losers"	Janis Joplin	2:03
7.	"Blindman"	Peter Albin, Andrew, David Getz, Gurley, Joplin	2:23
8.	"Down on Me"	Traditional; arranged by Janis Joplin	2:04
9.	"Caterpillar"	Peter Albin	2:18
10.	"All Is Loneliness"	Moondog	2:30
11.	"Coo Coo" (Single - Bonus track)	Traditional; arranged by Peter Albin	1:56
12.	"The Last Time" (Single - Bonus track)	Janis Joplin	2:15
13.	"Call On Me" (Bonus Track - Alternate Take)	Sam Andrew	2:41
14.	"Bye, Bye Baby" (Bonus Track - Alternate Take)	Powell St. John	2:39

== Personnel ==
Big Brother and the Holding Company

- Janis Joplin – vocals
- Peter Albin – bass guitar
- Sam Andrew – guitar, vocals
- David Getz – drums
- James Gurley – guitar, vocals
