= Blues' Blues =

Studio album by Blue Mitchell
- Released: 1972
- Recorded: 1972
- Genre: Jazz
- Length: 43:02
- Label: Mainstream
- Producer: Bob Shad

Blue Mitchell chronology
Vital Blue (1971)	Blues' Blues (1972)	The Last Tango = Blues (1973)

Blues' Blues is an album by American trumpeter Blue Mitchell recorded in 1972 and released on the Mainstream label.

== Reception ==
The Allmusic review by Scott Yanow awarded the album 2½ stars stating "the music overall is listenable and funky, but not particularly memorable. Just an average date from these fine musicians".

Professional ratings
Review scores
Source	Rating
Allmusic	2.5/5 stars

== Track listing ==
All compositions by Blue Mitchell except as indicated

1. "Casa Blues" (John Guerin) - 8:25
2. "Just Made Up" (Joe Sample) - 7:32
3. "Blues' Blues" - 7:05
4. "Granite & Concrete" (Hadley Caliman) - 9:51
5. "I Didn't Ask To Be" (George Bohanon) - 10:09
6. "Valerie" (Walter Bishop, Jr.) - 12:26 [Bonus track on CD reissue]
- Recorded in Los Angeles, California in 1972.

== Personnel ==
- Blue Mitchell - trumpet, flugelhorn
- John Mayall - harmonica
- Herman Riley - flute, tenor saxophone
- Freddy Robinson - guitar
- Joe Sample - piano, electric piano
- Darrell Clayborn - electric bass
- John Guerin - drums
