= Bubba Brooks =

American jazz musician

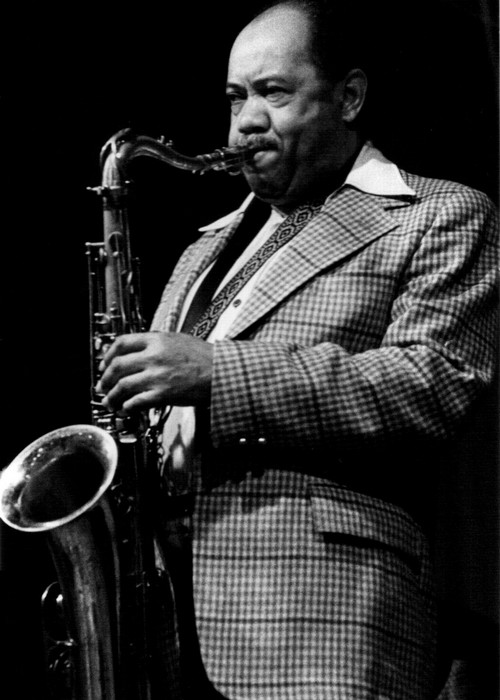
Bubba Brooks in 1980

David Kenneth Brooks, Jr., better known as Bubba Brooks or Bubber Brooks (May 29, 1922 in Fayetteville, North Carolina – April 11, 2002) was an American jazz tenor saxophonist. He was the brother of Tina Brooks.

Brooks's first professional gig was with the medicine show of Pepper McAllister. He served in the Army during World War II, there he played with James Moody. He moved to New York City after his discharge in 1944, where he played at Minton's Playhouse and the Harlem Grill. He toured North Carolina in a band alongside Sonny Payne in 1947, then played with George Barkley at the Baby Grand in New York; he first recorded with Barkley around 1947 or 1948. He then played with Sonny Thompson from 1948 to 1957.

In 1958, he worked with Jimmy McCracklin and, in 1961, with Phil Upchurch; he also did session work with pop musicians in the 1960s. From 1967 to 1973, he played at the Fantasy East in New York with alto saxophonist Charles Williams and Don Pullen, recording three albums as a trio for Mainstream Records. After a short run with Jimmy McGriff in 1974, Brooks became a member of Bill Doggett's ensemble, where he remained for two decades (1976–1996).

Brooks worked in the middle of the 1990s with Bross Townsend, Carrie Smith, and the Harlem Blues and Jazz Band. He did a tour of France with Al Casey in 1999.

== Discography ==
=== As leader ===
- Smooth Sailing (TCB, 1995)
- The Big Sound of Bubba Brooks (Claves Jazz, 1995)
- Polka Dots and Moonbeams (TCB, 1996)

=== As sideman ===
- Wynonie Harris (Route 66, 1954)
- Phil Upchurch You Can't Sit Down (United Artists, 1961)
- Phil Upchurch Twist - The Big Hit Dances (United Artists, 1961)
- Charles Williams - Charles Williams (Mainstream, 1971)
- Charles Williams - Trees and Grass and Things (Mainstream, 1972)
- Charles Williams - Stickball (Mainstream, 1973)
- Bill Doggett Am I Blue (Black & Blue, 1978)
- Bill Doggett Honky Tonk (Black & Blue, 1980)
- Bill Doggett The Right Choice (After Hours, 1991)
- Bross Townsend I Love Jump Jazz (Claves Jazz, 1995)
- Michel Pastre Live During a French Tour (Djaz, 1999)
- Joseph Carter In the Now (Velvet Swan, 2000)
- Bobby Forrester Organic Chemistry (Lollipop, 2001)
