= Your Mama Don't Dance (album) =

Studio album by Charles Kynard
- Released: 1973
- Recorded: 1973; Los Angeles, CA
- Genre: Jazz
- Label: Mainstream; MRL 389
- Producer: Bob Shad

Charles Kynard chronology
Woga (1972)	Your Mama Don't Dance (1973)

Your Mama Don't Dance is an album by organist Charles Kynard which was recorded in 1973 and released on the Mainstream label.

== Reception ==
Professional ratings
Review scores
Source	Rating
Allmusic	4/5 stars

Allmusic awarded the album 4 stars.

== Track listing ==
1. "Superstition" (Stevie Wonder) - 4:44
2. "The World Is a Ghetto" (War) - 2:59
3. "Momma Jive" (Richard Fritz) - 3:26
4. "I Got So Much Trouble" (Joe Quarterman) - 5:06
5. "Your Mama Don't Dance" (Kenny Loggins, Jim Messina) - 2:36
6. "Zambezi" (Fritz) - 5:34
7. "Summer Breeze" (Jim Seals, Dash Crofts) - 3:25
8. "You've Got It Bad Girl" (Stevie Wonder, Yvonne Wright) - 3:47

== Personnel ==
- Charles Kynard - organ
- James Kartchner, Jerry Rusch - trumpet
- George Bohanon, David Roberts - trombone
- Arthur Adams - guitar
- Chuck Rainey - electric bass
- Paul Humphrey, Raymond Pounds - drums
- Richard Fritz - arranger, conductor
