= Charles Kynard (album) =

Studio album by Charles Kynard
- Released: 1971
- Recorded: 1971; Los Angeles, CA
- Genre: Jazz
- Label: Mainstream; MRL 331
- Producer: Bob Shad

Charles Kynard chronology
Wa-Tu-Wa-Zui (Beautiful People) (1970)	Charles Kynard (1971)	Woga (1972)

Charles Kynard is an album by organist Charles Kynard which was recorded in 1971 and released on the Mainstream label.

== Reception ==
Professional ratings
Review scores
Source	Rating
Allmusic	4.5/5 stars

Michael G. Nastos of Allmusic said, "Kynard's best combo effort. Shows him in a more favorable light as a soul-jazz proprietor".

== Track listing ==
All compositions by Richard Fritz except as indicated

1. "El Torro Poo Poo" – 3:10
2. "Greeze" – 4:37
3. "She" – 6:31
4. "Grits" – 6:42
5. "Greens" – 4:37
6. "Nightwood" – 2:26
7. "It's Too Late" (Carole King, Toni Stern) – 9:18

== Personnel ==
- Charles Kynard – organ
- Ernie Watts – tenor saxophone
- Billy Fender – guitar
- Carol Kaye – electric bass
- James Gadson – drums
- King Errisson – congas
