= Pure Dynamite (Buddy Terry album) =

Studio album by Buddy Terry
- Released: 1972
- Recorded: 1972
- Genre: Jazz
- Length: 38:02
- Label: Mainstream; MRL 356
- Producer: Bob Shad

Buddy Terry chronology
Awareness (1971)	Pure Dynamite (1972)	Lean on Him (1973)

Pure Dynamite is an album by American saxophonist Buddy Terry recorded in 1972 and released on the Mainstream label.

== Reception ==
Professional ratings
Review scores
Source	Rating
Allmusic	3/5 stars

The Allmusic site awarded the album 3 stars.

== Track listing ==
All compositions by Buddy Terry except as indicated

1. "Quiet Afternoon" (Stanley Clarke) - 10:09
2. "Paranoia" - 10:45
3. "Baba Hengates" (Mtume) - 17:07

== Personnel ==
- Buddy Terry - tenor saxophone, soprano saxophone, flute
- Woody Shaw - trumpet
- Eddie Henderson - trumpet, flugelhorn
- Kenny Barron - piano
- Joanne Brackeen - piano, electric piano
- Stanley Clarke, Mchezaji - bass
- Billy Hart, Lenny White - drums
- Airto Moreira - percussion
- Mtumé - African percussion
