= George Bohanon =

American jazz musician (1937–2024)

George Roland Bohanon Jr. (August 7, 1937 – November 8, 2024) was an American jazz trombonist and session musician from Detroit, Michigan.

== Biography ==
In the early 1960s, he was a session player for several Motown recordings. As leader of the George Bohanon Quartet, he recorded two albums for Motown's Workshop Jazz imprint. Label mates included Johnny Griffith, Paula Greer, David Hamilton, Lefty Edwards and Herbie Williams. After appearing on several Motown recordings, together with leading musicians such as Hank Cosby, of the Funk Brothers, he went to live in California.

In 1962, he replaced Garnett Brown in the Chico Hamilton Quintet. In 1963 and 1964, he recorded two albums for Motown's short-lived Workshop Jazz label.

In 1971, he was a member of the Ernie Wilkins Orchestra, playing alongside fellow trombonist Benny Powell, that backed Sarah Vaughan on her A Time in My Life album, recorded in Los Angeles.

Between 1984 and 1993, he played in orchestras backing Frank Sinatra.

Bohanon died on November 8, 2024, at the age of 87.

== Discography ==
As leader

- Boss: Bossa Nova (Workshop Jazz, 1963)
- Blue Phase (Geobo Music, 1991)

With Karma

- Celebration (Horizon/A&M, 1976)
- For Everybody (Horizon/A&M, 1977)

With Monk Higgins

- Piping Hot (Phono, 1981)

With Miles Davis and Michel Legrand

- Dingo (soundtrack) (Warner Bros., 1991)

== As sideman ==
- 1966: The Dealer, Chico Hamilton (Impulse!)
- 1971: A Time in My Life, Sarah Vaughan (Mainstream)
- 1972: Woga, Charles Kynard (Mainstream)
- 1973: Your Mama Don't Dance, Charles Kynard (Mainstream)
- 1974: Northern Windows, Hampton Hawes (Prestige)
- 1974: Live'n Well, Bert Myrick (Strata)
- 1974: Slow Dancer, Boz Scaggs (Columbia Records)
- 1975: Stratosonic Nuances, Blue Mitchell (RCA)
- 1975: Black Miracle, Joe Henderson (Milestone)
- 1975: Places and Spaces, Donald Byrd (Blue Note)
- 1976: Eternity, Alice Coltrane (Warner Bros.)
- 1976: Everybody Come On Out, Stanley Turrentine (Fantasy)
- 1976: School Days, Stanley Clarke (Epic)
- 1976: Songs in the Key of Life, Stevie Wonder (Tamla)
- 1978: Jazz, Ry Cooder (Warner Bros.)
- 1978: Herb Alpert / Hugh Masekela (Horizon)
- 1979: We're the Best of Friends, Natalie Cole and Peabo Bryson
- 1992: GRP All-Star Big Band (GRP)
- 1992: Dave Grusin Presents GRP All-Star Big Band Live!
- 1995: All Blues
- 1997: Theme for Monterey, Gerald Wilson Orchestra
- 1998: 12 Songs of Christmas, Etta James (Private Music)
- 2005: Christmas Songs, Diana Krall
