= Tonight (Clark Terry-Bob Brookmeyer Quintet album) =

Studio album by Clark Terry-Bob Brookmeyer Quintet
- Released: 1965
- Recorded: November 23–24, 1964 in New York City
- Genre: Jazz
- Label: Mainstream
- Producer: Bob Shad

Clark Terry chronology
Oscar Peterson Trio + One (1964)	Tonight (1965)	The Power of Positive Swinging (1965)

Bob Brookmeyer chronology
Bob Brookmeyer and Friends (1964)	Tonight (1965)	The Power of Positive Swinging (1965)

Audio sample
- "Hum" by Bob Brookmeyer.: file; help

Tonight (also released as Straight No Chaser) is an album by the Clark Terry-Bob Brookmeyer Quintet, with Brookmeyer on trombone and Terry on trumpet and flugelhorn. With tracks recorded in 1964, the album was released on the Mainstream label the following year.

== Background ==
The Clark Terry-Bob Brookmeyer Quintet was formed in 1961 at the request of Frank Cantarina, the owner of the Half Note Club in New York City. The original group, consisting of Terry and Brookmeyer with Joe Benjamin (double bass), Osie Johnson (drums) and Eddie Costa (piano), had recorded, for another label, a live session at the club. That recording had to be abandoned because of the "horrible intonation of the piano". Brookmeyer had made the first advances to Terry, but Terry was under network contract and could only take outside engagements as a band leader - hence the name of the quintet and the name of the album. The band was featured several times "with unanimous acceptance" on NBC's The Tonight Show Starring Johnny Carson.

== Style ==
In the liner notes for the original 1965 album, Peter Spargo wrote, ".. the blend between Terry's horn and Brookmeyer's valve trombone is warm and original." He refers to the "brilliant piano work" of Kellaway and describes Bailey's drumming performance as having "impeccable taste and controlled nuances". Of Bill Crow's double bass playing, Spargo wrote, "His lines are clear and interesting, the pitch crisp and audible and he gives the entire group a solid foundation."

Of the album overall, Spargo wrote:

With such a brilliant rhythm section it is obvious that Clark and Bob feel relaxed and are allowed complete independence. It is also apparent from their ensemble duets that they are in complete control and know exactly what they want. Their individual solos are always intelligent and meaningful. So as Clark apologized for having kept you waiting, it is safe to that this album was worth waiting for.

== Reception ==
Professional ratings
Review scores
Source	Rating
AllMusic	3/5 stars

AllMusic's Scott Yanow wrote, "Flugelhornist Clark Terry and valve trombonist Bob Brookmeyer made for a very complementary pair in their mid-'60s quintet. Both had distinctive but similar sounds, impressive technique, the ability to swing anything and plenty of wit... Unfortunately, all ten selections clock in at around three minutes, so there is no real stretching out, but what is here is excellent."

== Track listing ==
"Step Right Up"
"Step Right Up" by Roger Kellaway.

1. "Tete a Tete" (Clark Terry) - 3:02
2. "Pretty Girl" (Bob Brookmeyer) - 3:00
3. "Blue China" (Brookmeyer) - 2:59
4. "Hum" (Brookmeyer) - 3:40
5. "Blindman, Blindman" (Herbie Hancock) - 2:29
6. "Step Right Up" (Roger Kellaway) - 2:57
7. "Weep" (Gary McFarland) - 2:55
8. "Straight No Chaser" (Thelonious Monk) - 2:49
9. "Sometime Ago" (Sergio Mihanovich) - 3:02
10. "Hymn" (Charlie Parker) - 2:42
- all tracks Terry (trumpet), except 4 and 5 Terry (flugelhorn)

== Issues and formats ==
The album was originally issued by Mainstream, in mono format as M56043 and in stereo format as S/6043. It was also issued as Mainstream MSTD102 under the title What'd he say?. It was later issued, in CD format, as Mainstream MDCD728, entitled Clark Terry/Bobby Brookmeyer Quintet.

The album was issued in the UK in 1965, by Fontana, with the title Tonight (TL 5265). It was also issued by Mainstream with the title Straight No Chaser (MRL-320).

The same track listing was also released, in CD format, by Lonehill Jazz, as LHJ10199, entitled Clark Terry/Bob Brookmeyer Quintet - Complete Studio Recordings and on Mainstream MRL320 in Japan as ECPL-125MS.

A single from the album, "Blindman, Blindman" (b/w "Straight No Chaser"), was also issued by Mainstream.

== Personnel ==
Musicians

- Clark Terry - trumpet, flugelhorn
- Bob Brookmeyer - valve trombone
- Roger Kellaway - piano
- Bill Crow - double bass
- Dave Bailey - drums

Production

- Bob Shad - artists and repertoire
- Bob Arnold - recording engineer
- Hal Diepold - mastering
- Peter Spargo - liner notes
- Harry Ringler - production coordinator
- Elena Festa - album coordination
- Jack Lonshein - cover art and design
- The Composing Rooms Inc - typography
- Global Albums Inc - printing and fabrication
- Burt Andrews - liner photographs
