= Jerry Rusch =

American jazz trumpeter

Jerry Rusch, also credited as Jerry Rush (May 8, 1943 – May 5, 2003), was an American jazz trumpeter.

Rusch studied at the University of Minnesota in 1962–64, then played in an Army Reserve band before moving to Los Angeles in 1966. There he played with Gerald Wilson (from 1967), Ray Charles (1972–73), Clifford Jordan, Joe Henderson, Willie Bobo, Louie Bellson, Teddy Edwards, Frank Foster, and Thad Jones/Mel Lewis. He played with Joe Haider's orchestra in Europe from 1982 to 1984. As a sideman, he recorded extensively; among his credits are work with Charles Kynard, Benny Powell, Henry Franklin, and Eddie Cleanhead Vinson.

He died of liver cancer in Las Vegas, aged 59.

== Discography ==
=== As leader ===
- Rush Hour (Inner City, 1979)
- Native L.A. (Jeru, 1990)
- Bright Moments (Jeru, 1991)
- Serenata (Jazzschool, 2010)

=== As sideman ===
- Richard "Groove" Holmes, Workin' on a Groovy Thing (World Pacific, 1969)
- Udo Jürgens, Hautnah (Ariola 1984)
- Charles Kynard, Woga (Mainstream, 1972)
- Charles Kynard, Your Mama Don't Dance (Mainstream, 1973)
- Blue Mitchell, Roy Haynes, Charles Kynard, Charles Williams, Booty (Mainstream, 1974)
- Jean-Luc Ponty, Electric Connection (World Pacific, 1969)
- Benny Powell, Ya Betcha B.P.!! (Los Angeles, 1979)
- Moacir Santos, Carnival of the Spirits (Blue Note, 1975)
- Eddie "Cleanhead" Vinson, The "Clean" Machine (Muse, 1978)
- Eddie "Cleanhead" Vinson, Eddie "Cleanhead" Vinson Sings the Blues (Muse, 1985)
- Gerald Wilson, Eternal Equinox (World Pacific, 1969)
