= Clifton "Jiggs" Chase =

American musician

Clifton "Jiggs" Chase (born 1940) is an American musician, composer, and influential record producer from New Jersey, United States. One of the earliest known recordings is his organ playing on the 1967 Buddy Terry recording Natural Soul (Prestige Records), alongside Woody Shaw.

== Career ==
In 1976, he did a record date in New York as a side-man to tenor saxophonist Pharoah Sanders on the album "Pharoah". Jiggs Chase would go on to become the music director for Pharoah Sanders Ensemble and as such would bring to his attention, Rickie Byars (Boger) who became lead singer in the Pharoah Sanders Ensemble and who for a time replaced Phyllis Hyman. Jiggs Chase was very influential in the career of Rickie and continued to expose her talents in bands where he served as music director, which included the Joe Thomas Band and various jazz trios in the New York and New Jersey area.

During the 1980s he was an in-house arranger and producer for Sugar Hill Records.

Although his name is not widely recognized, his ground breaking rhythm track sequencing on "The Message", by Grandmaster Flash and the Furious Five, on which he has a co-writing credit, helped propel hip hop into the future. The stark synthesizer stabs echoing over the urban funk groove of "The Message" was the work of "Jiggs", who had been brought in to produce the track at the request of label boss Sylvia Robinson. The original demo of "The Message" was written by Ed “Duke Bootee” Fletcher, a session percussionist for The Sugarhill Gang who came up with the hook "It's like a jungle sometimes". Later in the production process, Robinson added lyrics penned by Melle Mel, who rapped on the track.

Alongside contemporaries Herbie Hancock and Afrika Bambaataa, "Jiggs" contributed to hip hop's acoustic to electronic transformation. Chase also received co-writing credit on the Sugar Hill hit "Apache", which contains one of the most widely sampled breakbeats in history. Additional credits include arranging "That's the Joint" by the Funky Four Plus One and "My Favorite Person" by the O'Jays. Chase was the in-house producer/arranger at Sugar Hill Recording Studio and worked along with in-house engineer Steve Jerome. Sugar Hill Recording Studio in Englewood, New Jersey where "Jiggs" did some of his best work, was destroyed in a fire in 2002.

Chase also co-wrote many 80's dance tracks with influential hi-nrg producer & composer Bobby Orlando including "Whisper to a Scream" by Bobby O, "You and Me" by The Flirts (#1 on the dance chart in 1985), "Saving Myself for the One That I love" by Oh Romeo, and "Motorcycle Madness" by Tony Caso. Many of the tracks he co-wrote with Orlando were recorded at Sugar Hill Recording Studio with in-house engineer Steve Jerome.

== Discography ==
=== As sideman ===
- Claudja Barry, I, Claudja (Epic, 1987)
- Gloria Gaynor, The Answer (Florical Music, 1997)
- Grandmaster Flash and the Furious Five, The Message (Sugar Hill, 1982)
- Irene Reid, Two of Us (Glades, 1976)
- Pharoah Sanders, Pharoah (India Navigation, 1977)
- Buddy Terry, Natural Soul (Prestige, 1968)
- Joe Thomas, Speak Your Piece (Sue, 1964)
- Joe Thomas, Comin' Home (Cobblestone, 1968)
- Joe Thomas, Joy of Cookin' (Groove Merchant, 1972)
- The World's Famous Supreme Team, Rappin (Charisma, 1986)
