= Many Shades of Blue =

Studio album by Blue Mitchell
- Released: August 1, 1974
- Recorded: 1974
- Genre: Jazz
- Length: 34:34
- Label: Mainstream; MRL 402
- Producer: Bob Shad

Blue Mitchell chronology
Graffiti Blues (1973)	Many Shades of Blue (1974)	Stratosonic Nuances (1975)

Many Shades of Blue is an album by American trumpeter Blue Mitchell released on the Mainstream label in 1974.

== Reception ==
The Allmusic review awarded the album 2 stars.

Professional ratings
Review scores
Source	Rating
Allmusic	2/5 stars

== Track listing ==
All compositions by David Matthews

1. "Where It's At" - 3:30
2. "Harmony of the Underworld" - 5:50
3. "Funky Walk" - 4:36
4. "Blue Funk" - 4:37
5. "Golden Feathered Bird" - 4:04
6. "Beans and Taters" - 4:25
7. "Funny Bone" - 3:37
8. "Hot Stuff" - 3:55

== Personnel ==
- Blue Mitchell, Jim Bossy, Jon Faddis, Marky Markowitz - trumpet
- Joe Farrell - flute, tenor saxophone
- Seldon Powell - tenor saxophone, baritone saxophone
- Frank Vicari - tenor saxophone
- Joe Beck, John Tropea - guitar, acoustic guitar
- Sam Brown - acoustic guitar
- Wilbur Bascomb, Michael Moore - electric bass
- Jimmy Madison - drums
- David Matthews - arranger and conductor
