= Graffiti Blues =

Studio album by Blue Mitchell
- Released: 1973
- Recorded: March 1, 1973
- Studio: The Record Plant, Los Angeles
- Genre: Jazz
- Length: 41:21
- Label: Mainstream
- Producer: Bob Shad

Blue Mitchell chronology
The Last Tango = Blues (1973)	Graffiti Blues (1973)	Many Shades of Blue (1974)

Graffiti Blues is an album by American trumpeter Blue Mitchell recorded in 1973 and released on the Mainstream label.

== Reception ==
The Allmusic review by Scott Yanow awarded the album 3 stars stating "Although not up to the same level as Blue Mitchell's earlier Blue Note dates, this accessible set does a good job of balancing worthwhile solos with catchy rhythms and has dated surprisingly well".

Professional ratings
Review scores
Source	Rating
Allmusic	3/5 stars

== Track listing ==
1. "Graffiti Blues" (Blue Mitchell) - 7:16
2. "Yeah Ya Right" (Herman Riley) - 5:29
3. "Express" (Blue Mitchell) - 5:06
4. "Asso-Kam" (Joe Sample) - 7:24
5. "Dorado" (Joe Sample) - 8:59

Bonus tracks on CD reissue in 1991:

6. "Alone Again (Naturally)" (Gilbert O'Sullivan) - 3:24
7. "Where It's At" (David Matthews) - 3:31
8. "Funky Walk" (David Matthews) - 4:33
9. "Blue Funk" (David Matthews) - 4:38

- Recorded at the Record Plant in Los Angeles, California on March 1, 1973.

== Personnel ==
- Blue Mitchell - trumpet
- Don Bailey - harmonica
- Herman Riley - flute, tenor saxophone
- Freddy Robinson - guitar
- Joe Sample - piano, electric piano
- Walter Bishop, Jr. - piano
- Darrell Clayborn - electric bass
- Raymond Pounds - drums
