= Trees and Grass and Things =

Studio album by Charles Williams
- Released: 19 November 1971
- Recorded: 1971 in NYC
- Genre: Jazz
- Label: Mainstream; MRL 345
- Producer: Bob Shad

Charles Williams chronology
Charles Williams (1971)	Trees and Grass and Things (1971)	Stickball (1972)

Trees and Grass and Things is the second album recorded by American saxophonist Charles Williams in 1971 for the Mainstream label.

== Reception ==
Professional ratings
Review scores
Source	Rating
AllMusic	3/5 stars

AllMusic awarded the album 3 stars.

== Track listing ==
All compositions by Charles Williams except as indicated

1. "Trees and Grass and Things" (Don Pullen) - 4:33
2. "Chop! Chop!" (Charles Williams, Don Pullen, William Curtis, David Brooks) 4:34
3. "Cracklin' Bread" - 7:37
4. "Exactly Like You" (Dorothy Fields, Jimmy McHugh) - 4:40
5. "Booger Bear" - 4:48
6. "Moving Up" (Pullen) - 5:42
7. "Song from the Old Country" (Pullen) - 6:17

== Personnel ==
- Charles Williams - alto saxophone
- David "Bubba" Brooks - tenor saxophone
- Cornell Dupree - guitar
- Don Pullen - piano, organ
- Jimmy Lewis - electric bass
- Bill Curtis - drums
- Montego Joe - congas
