= Gingerbread Men (album) =

Studio album by Clark Terry/Bob Brookmeyer Quintet
- Released: 1966
- Recorded: 1966 in New York
- Genre: Jazz
- Label: Mainstream
- Producer: Bob Shad

Clark Terry chronology
Mumbles (1966)	Gingerbread Men (1966)	Spanish Rice (1967)

Bob Brookmeyer chronology
The Power of Positive Swinging (1965)	Gingerbread Men (1965)	Back Again (1978)

Gingerbread Men is an album by trumpeter Clark Terry and trombonist Bob Brookmeyer featuring tracks recorded in 1966 and originally released on the Mainstream label.

== Reception ==
Professional ratings
Review scores
Source	Rating
Allmusic	4/5 stars

Allmusic's Jason Ankeny awarded the album 4 stars and stated, "Perhaps because trumpeter Clark Terry and trombonist Bob Brookmeyer spent the majority of their respective careers as sidemen, they retain a remarkable spirit of generosity and unity as leaders. For all the virtuosity on display across Gingerbread Men, what impresses most is the selfless coherence of the session as a whole".

== Track listing ==
1. "Haig and Haig" (Clark Terry) – 4:24
2. "I Want a Little Girl" (Billy Moll, Murray Mencher) – 4:00
3. "Mood Indigo" (Barney Bigard, Duke Ellington, Irving Mills) – 6:46
4. "Milo's Other Samba" (Gary McFarland) – 2:48
5. "Gingerbread Boy" (Jimmy Heath) – 2:32
6. "My Gal" (Terry) – 5:30
7. "Naptown" (Alan Foust) – 5:28
8. "Morning Mist" (Hank Johnson) – 3:12
9. "Bye Bye Blackbird" (Ray Henderson, Mort Dixon) – 6:40

== Personnel ==
- Clark Terry – trumpet, flugelhorn, vocals
- Bob Brookmeyer – valve trombone
- Hank Jones – piano
- Bob Cranshaw – bass
- Dave Bailey – drums
