= Stickball (album) =

Studio album by Charles Williams
- Released: 11 November 1972
- Recorded: 1972 in NYC
- Genre: Jazz
- Label: Mainstream; MRL 381
- Producer: Bob Shad

Charles Williams chronology
Trees and Grass and Things (1971)	Stickball (1972)	When Alto Was King (1997)

Stickball is the third album by American saxophonist Charles Williams recorded in 1972 for the Mainstream label.

== Track listing ==
1. "Who Is He (And What Is He to You)?" (Bill Withers, Stan McKenny) - 3:33
2. "People Make the World Go 'Round" (Thom Bell, Linda Creed) - 3:24
3. "Where Is the Love" (Ralph MacDonald William Salter) - 2:44
4. "Iron Jaws" (Ernie Wilkins) - 6:35
5. "Drown in My Own Tears (Henry Glover) - 4:53
6. "Ain't No Blues" (Charles Williams, Don Pullen) - 4:17
7. "Just Before Day" (Tommy Dean) - 8:20
8. "Willow Weep for Me" (Ann Ronell) - 6:33 Bonus track on CD reissue

== Personnel ==
- Charles Williams - alto saxophone
- Randy Brecker - flugelhorn
- Chris Woods - alto saxophone, baritone saxophone
- David "Bubba" Brooks - tenor saxophone
- Frank Wess - tenor saxophone, flute
- Don Pullen - organ
- Paul Griffin - electric piano
- Cornell Dupree, David Spinozza - electric guitar
- Gordon Edwards - Fender Jazz bass
- Clyde Lucas - drums
- Ray Barretto - congas
- David Carey - congas, marimba
- String section arranged and conducted by Ernie Wilkins
