= Awareness (album) =

Studio album by Buddy Terry
- Released: 1971
- Recorded: 1971
- Genre: Jazz
- Label: Mainstream; MRL 336
- Producer: Bob Shad

Buddy Terry chronology
Natural Soul (1968)	Awareness (1971)	Pure Dynamite (1972)

Awareness is an album by American saxophonist Buddy Terry recorded in 1971 and released on the Mainstream label.

== Reception ==
Professional ratings
Review scores
Source	Rating
Allmusic	4/5 stars

The Allmusic review by Jason Ankeny awarded the album 4 stars stating "Terry moves from soprano to tenor to flute and back again, exemplifying the soul-searching restlessness of his music--at the same time, the individual players fuse seamlessly, channeling the righteous fury of Terry's vision to create a coherent, deeply righteous whole".

== Track listing ==
All compositions by Buddy Terry except as indicated

1. "Awareness (Suite)" - 10:49
  1. "Omnipotence"
  2. "Babylon"
  3. "Unity"
  4. "Humility (Trio for Two Bassists and Tenor)"
2. "Kamili" (Mtumé) - 8:00
3. "Stealin' Gold" (Stanley Cowell) - 7:04
4. "Sodom and Gomorrah" - 12:06
5. "Abscretions" (Cowell) - 4:49

== Personnel ==
- Buddy Terry - tenor saxophone, soprano saxophone, flute, percussion
- Cecil Bridgewater - trumpet, percussion
- Roland Prince - electric guitar
- Stanley Cowell - piano, electric piano
- Buster Williams - bass, electric bass
- Victor Gaskin - bass, electric bass, percussion
- Mickey Roker - drums
- Mtumé - congas
