= Lean on Him =

Studio album by Buddy Terry
- Released: 1973
- Recorded: 1972
- Genre: Jazz
- Label: Mainstream; MRL 391
- Producer: Bob Shad

Buddy Terry chronology
Pure Dynamite (1972)	Lean on Him (1973)

Lean on Him is an album by American saxophonist Buddy Terry released on the Mainstream label in 1973.

== Track listing ==
All compositions by Buddy Terry except as indicated

1. "Lean on Me (Lean on Him)" (Bill Withers) – 5:46
2. "Holy, Holy, Holy" (Traditional) – 5:29
3. "Climbing Higher Mountains" (Traditional) – 3:07
4. "Amazing Grace" (Traditional) – 4:42
5. "Inner Peace" – 10:14
6. "Precious Lord, Take My Hand" (Thomas A. Dorsey) – 5:36
7. "Love Offering" – 7:24

== Personnel ==
- Buddy Terry – tenor saxophone, soprano saxophone, flute, arranger
- Eddie Henderson – trumpet, flugelhorn
- Jay Berliner – electric guitar
- Larry Willis – piano, electric piano
- Ernie Hayes – organ
- Wilbur Bascomb – electric bass
- Bernard Purdie – drums
- Lawrence Killian – percussion
- Alphonse Mouzon, Dee Dee Bridgewater – vocals
