= The Last Tango = Blues =

1973 studio album by Blue Mitchell

Studio album by Blue Mitchell
- Released: March 7, 1973
- Recorded: 1972
- Genre: Jazz
- Length: 27:39
- Label: Mainstream
- Producer: Bob Shad

Blue Mitchell chronology
| Blues' Blues (1972) | The Last Tango = Blues (1973) | Graffiti Blues (1973) |

The Last Tango = Blues is an album by American trumpeter Blue Mitchell recorded in 1972 and released on the Mainstream label in 1973.

== Reception ==
The AllMusic review by Jason Ankeny awarded the album 4 stars, stating: "The Last Tango = Blues translates the direct, soulful hard bop approach of Blue Mitchell's cult-classic Blue Note sessions into the funk-inspired grammar of mid-Seventies mainstream jazz... the performances are strictly next-level, complete with some of Mitchell's most fiery trumpet."

Professional ratings
Review scores
| Source | Rating |
|---|---|
| AllMusic | 4/5 stars |

== Track listing ==
1. "Soul Turn Around" (Walter Bishop, Jr.) - 4:20
2. "Killing Me Softly With His Song" (Charles Fox, Norman Gimbel) - 2:53
3. "The Message" (Patrick Patterson, Steve Scipio) - 3:20
4. "Steal the Feel" (Richard Fritz) - 4:15
5. "Last Tango in Paris" (Gato Barbieri) - 2:42
6. "One for Russ" (Alf Clausen) - 4:15
7. "Peace" (Horace Silver) - 2:50
8. "P.T. Blues" (Blue Mitchell) - 3:04

- Recorded in Los Angeles, California, in 1972.

== Personnel ==
- Blue Mitchell - trumpet
- Jackie Kelso, Bill Perkins - flute, tenor saxophone
- David Angel - clarinet, alto saxophone
- Steve Kravitz - bass clarinet, baritone saxophone
- Herman Riley - tenor saxophone
- David T. Walker - guitar
- Charles Kynard - organ
- Darrell Clayborn, Chuck Rainey - electric bass
- Raymond Pounds - drums
- King Errisson, Paul Humphrey, Chino Valdes - percussion
- Dick Fritz - arranger
