= Woga (album) =

Studio album by Charles Kynard
- Released: 1972
- Recorded: 1972; Los Angeles, CA
- Genre: Jazz
- Label: Mainstream; MRL 366
- Producer: Bob Shad

Charles Kynard chronology
Charles Kynard (1971)	Woga (1972)	Your Mama Don't Dance (1973)

Woga is an album by American organist Charles Kynard which was recorded in 1972 (Los Angeles, CA) and released on the Mainstream label.

== Reception ==
Professional ratings
Review scores
Source	Rating
Allmusic	4/5 stars

Allmusic awarded the album 4 stars.

== Track listing ==
All compositions by Richard Fritz except as indicated

1. "Little Ghetto Boy" (Earl DuRouen, Edward Howard) - 3:04
2. "Hot Sauce" - 4:32
3. "Lime Twig" - 3:43
4. "Slop Jar" - 9:12
5. "Rock Steady" (Aretha Franklin) - 3:13
6. "Name the Missing Word" (Homer Banks, Bettye Crutcher, Raymond Jackson) - 3:21
7. "The First Time Ever (I Saw Your Face)" (Ewan MacColl) - 2:58
8. "Shout" - 6:15

== Personnel ==
- Charles Kynard - organ
- James Kartchner, Jerry Rusch - trumpet
- George Bohanon, David Roberts - trombone
- Arthur Adams - guitar
- Chuck Rainey - electric bass
- Paul Humphrey - drums
- Richard Fritz - arranger, conductor
