= Mumbles (album) =

Studio album by Clark Terry
- Released: 1966
- Recorded: 1966 in New York
- Genre: Jazz
- Label: Mainstream; 56066/S6066; Fontana
- Producer: Bob Shad

Clark Terry chronology
The Power of Positive Swinging (1965)	Mumbles (1966)	Gingerbread Men (1966)

Mumbles (also reissued as Angyumaluma Bongliddleany Nannyany Awhan Yi!) is an album by trumpeter Clark Terry featuring tracks recorded in 1964 and originally released on the Mainstream label.

== Reception ==
Professional ratings
Review scores
Source	Rating
Allmusic	2.5/5 stars
Allmusic	4/5 stars

Allmusic's Ken Dryden awarded the album 2½ stars and states "Clark Terry launched his "Mumbles" routine (where he delivered semi-coherent vocals interspersed with scat) with two numbers on a studio date for Verve led by Oscar Peterson; this Mainstream LP finds him expanding the concept to album length, with mixed success. Unfortunately, the effort becomes a little too commercial, not only de-emphasizing the jazz element to focus on the vocals, but adding lackluster songs". The retitled rerelease was awarded 4 stars by Richard S. Ginell who commented "As per the weird title, the music within this LP is among the happiest and most lighthearted (perhaps even occasionally light-headed) of Clark Terry's long, happy career".

== Track listing ==
1. "The Mumbler Strikes Again" (Clark Terry) - 3:07
2. "Big Spender" (Cy Coleman, Dorothy Fields) - 2:29
3. "Rum and Mumbles" (Terry, Joe Cain) - 2:50
4. "The Shadow of Your Smile" (Johnny Mandel, Paul Francis Webster) - 2:19
5. "Mumbles" (Terry) - 2:42
6. "Grand Dad's Blues" (Terry) - 3:52
7. "The Cat from Cadiz" (Cain) - 4:35
8. "Never" (Terry) - 3:37
9. "I'm Beginning to See the Light" (Duke Ellington, Don George, Johnny Hodges, Harry James) - 2:34
10. "Night Song" (Charles Strouse, Lee Adams) - 2:40
11. "El Blues Latino" (Cain) - 3:07

== Personnel ==
- Clark Terry - trumpet, flugelhorn, vocal
- Jerome Richardson - tenor saxophone, baritone saxophone, sopranino saxophone, flute, piccolo
- Frank Anderson - piano, organ
- Vinnie Bell, Eric Gale - guitar
- Richard Davis, George Duvivier - bass
- Grady Tate - drums
- Phil Kraus - percussion
- Willie Bobo - congas
- José Mangual - bongos
- Joe Cain - arranger
