= The Power of Positive Swinging =

Studio album by Clark Terry Bob Brookmeyer Quintet
- Released: 1965
- Recorded: March 1965
- Genre: Jazz
- Length: 43:37
- Label: Mainstream
- Producer: Bob Shad

Clark Terry chronology
Tonight (1965)	The Power of Positive Swinging (1965)	Mumbles (1966)

Bob Brookmeyer chronology
Tonight (1965)	The Power of Positive Swinging (1965)	Gingerbread Men (1966)

The Power of Positive Swinging is an album released by American jazz trumpeter Clark Terry and trombonist Bob Brookmeyer featuring tracks recorded in 1965 and originally released on the Mainstream label.

== Reception ==
Professional ratings
Review scores
Source	Rating
Allmusic	4/5 stars

Allmusic awarded the album 4 stars and stated: "As expected, there was always plenty of interplay between the fluent horns and some sly examples of their humor".

== Track listing ==
1. "Dancing on the Grave" (Bob Brookmeyer) - 2:33
2. "The Battle Hymn of the Republic" (Traditional) - 3:32
3. "The King" (Count Basie) - 5:44
4. "Ode to a Flugelhorn" (Clark Terry) - 5:38
5. "A Gal in Calico" (Leo Robin, Arthur Schwartz) - 6:04
6. "Green Stamps" (Brookmeyer) - 5:08
7. "Hawg Jawz" (Terry) - 2:24
8. "Simple Waltz" (Terry) - 5:18
9. "Just an Old Manuscript" (Andy Razaf, Don Redman) - 7:30

== Personnel ==
- Clark Terry - trumpet, flugelhorn
- Bob Brookmeyer - valve trombone
- Roger Kellaway - piano
- Bill Crow - bass
- Dave Bailey - drums
