= Charles Williams (album) =

Studio album by Charles Williams
- Released: 8 March 1971
- Recorded: January 1971 in NYC
- Genre: Jazz
- Label: Mainstream; MRL 312
- Producer: Bob Shad

Charles Williams chronology
Charles Williams (1971)	Trees and Grass and Things (1972)

Charles Williams is the debut album recorded by American saxophonist Charles Williams in 1971 for the Mainstream label.

== Reception ==
Professional ratings
Review scores
Source	Rating
AllMusic	4/5 stars

AllMusic awarded the album 4 stars and its review by Jason Ankeny states "Williams proves a deceptively commanding presence, eschewing pyrotechnics and histrionics on a series of earthy yet accomplished solos that ripple with imagination. The organic groove extends across the record, and while each player shines, the music is far greater than the sum of its parts".

== Track listing ==
All compositions by Charles Williams except as indicated

1. "You Got Me Running" (Jimmy Reed) - 7:53
2. "Please Send Me Someone to Love" (Percy Mayfield) - 7:51
3. "Bacon Butt Fat" - 5:33
4. "Country Mile" - 3:50
5. "Catfish Sam'ich" - 5:05
6. "There Is No Greater Love" (Isham Jones, Marty Symes) - 8:39
7. "(Where Do I Begin?) Love Story" (Carl Sigman, Francis Lai) - 2:44 Bonus track on CD reissue

== Personnel ==
- Charles Williams - alto saxophone
- David "Bubba" Brooks - tenor saxophone
- Earl Dunbar - guitar
- Don Pullen - organ
- Gordon Edwards - electric bass
- Bill Curtis - drums
