= Reelin' with the Feelin' =

Studio album by Charles Kynard
- Released: 1969
- Recorded: August 11, 1969; Los Angeles, California
- Genre: Jazz
- Label: Prestige; PR 7688
- Producer: Bob Porter

Charles Kynard chronology
The Soul Brotherhood (1968)	Reelin' with the Feelin' (1969)	Afro-Disiac (1970)

Reelin' with the Feelin' is an album by organist Charles Kynard which was recorded in 1969 and released on the Prestige label.

== Reception ==
Professional ratings
Review scores
Source	Rating
Allmusic	4.5/5 stars

Allmusic awarded the album 4½ stars stating "From the title track, we gather this session is a blast of hard funk and groove where the blues are all built into shuffles and strolls and distorted by electricity -- Kynard's organ is so overloaded in the mix it's hard at times to tell what instrument he's playing, he's kickin' it that hard".

== Track listing ==
All compositions by Richard Fritz except as indicated

1. "Reelin' with the Feelin'" - 7:15
2. "Soul Reggae" (Carol Kaye) - 4:56
3. "Slow Burn" - 6:33
4. "Boogalooin'" - 6:23
5. "Be My Love" (Nicholas Brodszky, Sammy Cahn) - 6:19
6. "Stomp" (Wilton Felder) - 5:07

== Personnel ==
- Charles Kynard - organ
- Wilton Felder - tenor saxophone
- Joe Pass - guitar
- Carol Kaye - electric bass
- Paul Humphrey - drums
- Richard Fritz - arranger (tracks 1 & 3–6)
