= Electric Soul! =

Studio album by Buddy Terry
- Released: 1967
- Recorded: February 23, 1967
- Studio: Van Gelder Studio, Englewood Cliffs, NJ
- Genre: Jazz
- Length: 39:55
- Label: Prestige; PR 7525
- Producer: Cal Lampley

Buddy Terry chronology
Electric Soul! (1967)	Natural Soul (1968)

Electric Soul! is the debut album by American saxophonist Buddy Terry recorded in 1967 and released on the Prestige label.

== Reception ==
Professional ratings
Review scores
Source	Rating
AllMusic	3/5 stars

AllMusic awarded the album 3 stars.

== Track listing ==
All compositions by Buddy Terry except as noted

1. "Electric Soul" - 6:50
2. "Alfie" (Burt Bacharach, Hal David) - 4:45
3. "Hey, Nellie" - 4:35
4. "Everything Is Everything" (Whitaker) - 4:35
5. "The Ubangi That Got Away" - 7:15
6. "Jimmy" (Jay Thompson) - 5:15
7. "The Band Bandit" - 6:40

== Personnel ==
- Buddy Terry - tenor saxophone, varitone
- Jimmy Owens - trumpet, flugelhorn
- Harold Mabern - piano
- Ron Carter - bass
- Freddie Waits - drums
