= Afro-Disiac =

Studio album by Charles Kynard
- Released: 1970
- Recorded: April 6, 1970
- Studio: Van Gelder Studio, Englewood Cliffs, New Jersey
- Genre: Jazz
- Length: 38:54
- Label: Prestige; PR 7796
- Producer: Bob Porter

Charles Kynard chronology
Reelin' with the Feelin' (1970)	Afro-Disiac (1970)	Wa-Tu-Wa-Zui (Beautiful People) (1970)

Afro-Disiac is an album by organist Charles Kynard which was recorded in 1970 and released on the Prestige label.

== Reception ==
Professional ratings
Review scores
Source	Rating
Allmusic	4.5/5 stars

Richie Unterberger of Allmusic said, "On this 1970 session, Kynard was backed by a first-rate quartet of musicians that often appeared on Prestige soul-jazz dates of the early 1970s... Kynard's one of the more understated soul-jazz organists of the era, and shares space pretty generously with the other musicians on these basic, funky vamps".

== Track listing ==
All compositions by Richard Fritz except where noted.

1. "Afro-Disiac" – 4:52
2. "Bella Donna" – 5:03
3. "Trippin'" (Charles Kynard) – 9:00
4. "Odds On" – 7:07
5. "Sweetheart" (Winfield Scott) – 7:52
6. "Chanson Du Nuit" – 5:00

== Personnel ==
- Charles Kynard – organ
- Houston Person – tenor saxophone
- Grant Green – guitar
- Jimmy Lewis – electric bass
- Bernard Purdie – drums
- Richard Fritz – arranger (tracks 1, 2, 4 & 6)
