= Bob Brookmeyer and Friends =

Studio album by Bob Brookmeyer
- Released: 1964
- Recorded: May 26–27, 1964
- Studio: 30th Street Studio
- Genre: Jazz
- Label: Columbia
- Producer: Teo Macero

Bob Brookmeyer chronology
Samba Para Dos (1963)	Bob Brookmeyer and Friends (1964)	Tonight (1965)

Professional ratings
Review scores
Source	Rating
AllMusic	3/5 stars
The Penguin Guide to Jazz Recordings	3/4 stars
Record Mirror	3/5 stars
The Rolling Stone Jazz Record Guide	4/5 stars

Bob Brookmeyer and Friends is a 1964 jazz album released on Columbia Records by valve trombonist Bob Brookmeyer and featuring tenor saxophonist Stan Getz.

Reviewer Scott Yanow said that "the young rhythm section (pianist Herbie Hancock, vibraphonist Gary Burton, bassist Ron Carter, and drummer Elvin Jones) uplifts what would have been a fairly conventional (although high quality) bop date".

The "all-star" rhythm section included Miles Davis' piano and bass players, Stan Getz's vibraphonist, and John Coltrane's drummer.

The album was recorded at Columbia's 30th Street Studio, on May 26 and 27, 1964, and was issued on vinyl later the same year. It was reissued on vinyl LP in 1980 and on CD in 2005. Burton was a partial contributor and is heard only on some tracks.

== Track listing ==
All compositions by Bob Brookmeyer, unless otherwise noted.

1. "Jive Hoot" (4:43)
2. "Misty" (5:15) - (Erroll Garner, Johnny Burke)
3. "The Wrinkle" (5:16)
4. "Bracket (4:58)
5. "Skylark" (5:01) - (Hoagy Carmichael, Johnny Mercer)
6. "Sometime Ago" (4:05) - (Sergio Mihanovich)
7. "I've Grown Accustomed to Her Face" (5:03) - (Alan Jay Lerner, Frederick Loewe)
8. "Who Cares?" (7:04) - (George Gershwin, Ira Gershwin)
9. "Day Dream" (5:18) - (Strayhorn/Ellington/La Touche)
10. "Time For Two" (3:37) - (Margo Guryan Rosner)
11. "Pretty Girl" (4:50)

Tracks 9–11 previously unissued

Note: on the 1980 vinyl LP version "The Wrinkle" was incorrectly titled "Wrinkle Time".

== Personnel ==
- Bob Brookmeyer – Valve trombone
- Stan Getz – Tenor saxophone
- Gary Burton – Vibraphone (tracks 1–3, 5, 10, 11)
- Herbie Hancock – Piano
- Ron Carter – Bass
- Elvin Jones – Drums
- Tony Bennett – Vocals (track 9)

Production

- Producer - Teo Macero
