= The Superfine Dandelion =

- Origin: Phoenix, Arizona
- Genres: Psychedelic rock
- Years active: 1967–1968
- Label: Mainstream Records
- Past members: Mike McFadden; Ed Black; Rick Anderson; Mike Collins

The Superfine Dandelion was an American psychedelic rock band from Phoenix, Arizona. They released one studio album, The Superfine Dandelion, in 1967 before they disbanded in 1968.

== Career ==
The Superfine Dandelion was founded in 1967 by Mike McFadden, a member of the Mile Ends, another Phoenix garage rock band. This included bassist Ed Black and later Rick Anderson, the bassist for the Tubes. Mike Collins was the band's drummer. The group was influenced by Buffalo Springfield, the Lovin' Spoonful, and Jefferson Airplane.

The Superfine Dandelion were signed onto Mainstream Records in 1967 where they released their first and only album, The Superfine Dandelion. The album flopped on the charts, and the group disbanded in 1968.

== Aftermath ==
Ed Black and Mike McFadden went on to work with the Goose Creek Symphony and Linda Ronstadt. Anderson went on to be a founding member of The Tubes.
