= Pharoah (album) =

Studio album by Pharoah Sanders
- Released: 1977
- Recorded: August and September 1976
- Genre: Jazz
- Length: 40:20
- Label: India Navigation
- Producer: India Navigation Company

Pharoah Sanders chronology
Elevation (1974)	Pharoah (1977)	Love Will Find a Way (1977)

Pharoah is an album by the saxophonist Pharoah Sanders, recorded in 1976 and released on the India Navigation label. The album was reissued in 2023, along with two live performances of "Harvest Time".

== Reception ==
Professional ratings
Review scores
Source	Rating
AllMusic	2.5/5 stars
The Encyclopedia of Popular Music	3/5 stars
Pitchfork	8.9/10
The Rolling Stone Jazz & Blues Album Guide	3/5 stars

In a review for AllMusic, John Bush acknowledged that "the playing is excellent", but stated that Sanders was "beginning to drift into watery new age muzak." He concluded: "Clearly, Pharoah Sanders was losing his way a full ten years after the death of John Coltrane."

A 2023 review of the reissue by Pitchfork was given the site's "Best New Reissue" distinction, with Mark Richardson writing that it "captures a feeling of unearthly magic" as "the modest recording is perfect for the music, framing a peculiar mood and atmosphere that's lusty and joyous one moment and haunting and meditative the next".

== Track listing ==
All compositions by Pharoah Sanders.

1. "Harvest Time" – 20:15
2. "Love Will Find a Way" – 14:31
3. "Memories of Edith Johnson" – 5:40

== Personnel ==
- Pharoah Sanders – tenor saxophone, percussion, vocals
- Bedria Sanders – harmonium (track 1)
- Clifton "Jiggs" Chase – organ (tracks 2 & 3)
- Tisziji Munoz – guitar
- Steve Neil – bass
- Greg Bandy – drums (tracks 2 & 3)
- Lawrence Killian – percussion

== Charts ==
2023 chart performance for Pharoah
Chart (2023)	Peak position
German Albums (Offizielle Top 100)	54
UK Album Downloads (OCC)	41
UK Independent Albums (OCC)	38
