= Swingadelic =

Jazz/blues ensemble

- Origin: Hoboken, New Jersey
- Genres: jazz, blues, swing
- Years active: 1998-Present
- Labels: MediaMix Entertainment, ZOHO
- Members: Audrey Welber; Michael Weisberger; John DiSanto; Bryan Davis; Carlos Francis; Neal Pawley; Alex Jeun; Rob Edwards; John Bauers; Boo Reiners; Paul Pizzuti; Dave Post
- Website: Official website

Swingadelic is a jazz/blues ensemble founded in 1998 in Hoboken, New Jersey by bassist Dave Post.

Alto/tenor sax player Buddy Terry joined the group in 2000 and remained in the band until having a stroke in December 2010 when his duties were taken over by multi-reed player Audrey Welber. Other notables that have performed with Swingadelic are Eddie Gladden, Ronnie Cuber, Virgil Jones, Julio Fernandez, Bill Easley and Michael Hashim.

== Discography ==
- Boogie Boo! (MediaMix, 1999)
- Organ-ized! (MediaMix, 2002)
- Big Band Blues (MediaMix, 2005)
- Another Monday Night (MediaMix, 2007)
- The Other Duke: Tribute To Duke Pearson (ZOHO Music, 2011)
- Toussaintville (ZOHO Music, 2013) with Queen Esther
- Mercerville (ZOHO Music, 2017)
- Bluesville (ZOHO Music, 2020)
