= Kittie Doswell =

American jazz musician (1939–2011)

- Doswell, early 1960s

Background information
- Also known as: Miss Soul
- Born: April 14, 1939; Houston, Texas, US
- Died: May 1, 2011 (aged 72)
- Genres: R&B; soul; jazz
- Instrument: Vocals
- Years active: 1960s–1970s
- Labels: Soul; Mainstream Records

Kittie Doswell (April 14, 1939 – May 1, 2011) was an American R&B, soul, and jazz vocalist from Houston, Texas, United States, who later in life began a public service career.

== Music career ==
Doswell produced several notable records in the 1960s and 1970s, and was at one time working in both Los Angeles and New York. In New York she recorded twice for The Night Blooming Jazzmen in 1971 and 1972, and worked with Leonard Feather, Blue Mitchell, Ernie Watts, Fred Robinson, Chino Valdes, Paul Humphries, Max Bennett, and Al McKibbon.

== Later career ==
From 1969 to 1974, Doswell was a communication operator with Los Angeles County. From 1976 to 1985, she worked at Forest Lawn Memorial Park (Glendale) in Glendale, California as a licensed embalmer.

Doswell later began a career with the U.S. Food and Drug Administration in 1985, serving as a seafood inspector in FDA's Los Angeles District, San Pedro, California. She served in that capacity until her death on May 1, 2011, due to lung cancer. Known to coworkers as 'Ms. Kittie,' she proved productive in what is normally a labor-intensive activity even for younger workers. Her greatest contribution within FDA, however, was as a trainer and mentor of new employees. In addition, she was active in the LGBT community, promoting awareness and participating in numerous fundraisers and publicity campaigns.

== Partial discography ==
=== As Kittie “Miss Soul” Doswell ===
With the Ray Johnson Combo:

- Soul So-01 – "Need Your Love So Bad" / "When the Saints Go Marching In" – 1964
- Soul Sm-02 – "Hold On" / "I Found Out" – 1964
- Soul So-02 – "Broken Pieces Of My Heart" / "Watch Out" – 1964
- Soul So-03 – "The Nearness Of You" / "Ride On Blue Train" – 1964

=== As Kittie Doswell ===
- Donna Records 1347 (7") – "Need Your Love So Bad" b/w "Marchin' On" – 1961
- Soul So-300 – "Your Old Standby" / "Understanding" – 1964
- Mainstream Records MRL 348 (The Night Blooming Jazzmen – The Night Blooming Jazzmen) – Vocals on "Evil Gal Blues" – 1971
- Mainstream Records MSL 1016 (The Night Blooming Jazzmen – Freedom Jazz Dance) – Vocals on "Counting My Tears" – 1973
- H E S Records 2468 – "Just A Face In The Crowd" / "This Could Only Happen To Me" – 1973
