= Where It's At (Charles Kynard album) =

1963 debut album by Charles Kynard

Where It's At!

Studio album by Charles Kynard
- Released: 1963
- Recorded: 1963; Pacific Jazz Studios, Hollywood, California
- Genre: Jazz
- Label: Pacific Jazz; PJ 72
- Producer: Richard Bock

Charles Kynard chronology
Where It's At! (1963)	Warm Winds (1964)

Professional ratings
Review scores
Source	Rating
Allmusic	3/5 stars

Where It's At! is the debut album by organist Charles Kynard recorded in 1963 in California and released on the Pacific Jazz label.

== Reception ==
The Allmusic site awarded the album 3 stars stating "This is Kynard's first album and it has not been reissued".

== Track listing ==
All compositions by Charles Kynard except as indicated

1. "I'll Fly Away" (Albert E. Brumley) - 3:37
2. "Amazing Grace" (John Newton) - 2:42
3. "Motherless Child" (Traditional) - 2:37
4. "The Lord Will Make a Way Somehow" (Hezekiah Walker) - 4:47
5. "I Want To Be Ready" - 2:20
6. "Smooth Sailing" - 3:12
7. "I Wonder" - 5:13
8. "Blue Greens and Beans" (Mal Waldron) - 3:24
9. "Sports Lament" - 5:03
10. "Where It's At" - 3:45

== Personnel ==
- Charles Kynard - organ
- Clifford Scott - tenor saxophone, alto saxophone (tracks 2–10)
- Ronnell Bright - piano (track 1)
- Ray Crawford (track 1), Howard Roberts (tracks 2–10) - guitar
- Leroy Henderson (track 1), Milt Turner (tracks 2–10) - drums
