= Warm Winds =

Studio album by Charles Kynard & Buddy Collette
- Released: 1964
- Recorded: 1964; World Pacific Studios, Hollywood, CA
- Genre: Jazz
- Label: World Pacific; WP-1823 / ST-1823
- Producer: Richard Bock

Charles Kynard chronology
Where It's At! (1963)	Warm Winds (1964)	Professor Soul (1968)

Buddy Collette chronology
At the Cinema! (1959)	Warm Winds (1964)	The Girl from Ipenema (1964)

Professional ratings
Review scores
Source	Rating
Allmusic	3/5 stars

Warm Winds is an album by organist Charles Kynard and flautist Buddy Collette recorded in 1964 in California and released on the World Pacific label.

== Reception ==
The Allmusic site awarded the album 3 stars.

== Track listing ==
All compositions by Charles Kynard except as indicated

1. "Strong Breeze" - 3:07
2. "Mamblues" (Cal Tjader) - 2:50
3. "Blue Sands" (Buddy Collette) - 3:49
4. "Warm Winds" (Tex Johnson) - 4:25
5. "Cubano Chant" (Ray Bryant) - 3:35
6. "Watermelon Bag" - 3:00
7. "Satin Doll" (Duke Ellington) - 4:17
8. "Guachi Guaro" (Chano Pozo, Dizzy Gillespie) - 5:00

== Personnel ==
- Charles Kynard - organ
- Buddy Collette - flute
- John Rae - vibraphone, timbales
- Al McKibbon - bass
- Doug Sides - drums
- Bill Fitch - congas
- Armando Peraza - congas, bongos, wido
- Nick Martinez - wido, timbales
