= When Alto Was King =

Studio album by C. I. Williams
- Released: August 19, 1997
- Recorded: May 9, 1995 & March 12, 1996
- Genre: Jazz
- Length: 59:08
- Label: Mapleshade; 04532
- Producer: Hamiet Bluiett

C. I. Williams chronology
Stickball (1972)	When Alto Was King (1997)

When Alto Was King is the final album recorded by American saxophonist C. I. Williams released in 1997 on the Mapleshade label a quarter century after his previous album.

== Reception ==
Professional ratings
Review scores
Source	Rating
AllMusic	4/5 stars

AllMusic awarded the album 4 stars stating "this superb-sounding album is a fitting showcase for Williams' alto talents". In JazzTimes Willard Jenkins wrote "Mr. Williams has a buttery tone that is delivered with authority and the veteran's sense of relaxed swing. His tone bending, for example, is done very subtly and with a knowingness that never announces the arrival of the next bended note. He plays it with a liquidity and fluid sense of phrasing that makes every piece a study in elegance".

== Track listing ==
All compositions by C. I. Williams except as indicated

1. "You'd Be So Nice to Come Home To" (Cole Porter) - 5:12
2. "Punkin Juice" - 5:45
3. "'Round Midnight" (Thelonious Monk) - 8:08
4. "Catfish Sammich" - 4:57
5. "Misty" (Erroll Garner) - 5:57
6. "Lover Man" (Jimmy Davis, Ram Ramirez, James Sherman) - 6:32
7. "Because of You" (Arthur Hammerstein, Dudley Wilkinson) - 3:29
8. "Jeep's Blues" (Duke Ellington, Johnny Hodges) - 6:55
9. "I'll Close My Eyes" (Buddy Kaye, Billy Reid) - 5:03
10. "Avalon" (Buddy DeSylva, Al Jolson, Vincent Rose) - 2:37
11. "Precious Lord" (Thomas A. Dorsey) - 2:07

== Personnel ==
- C. I. Williams - alto saxophone
- Larry Willis - piano (tracks 1–7, 10 & 11)
- Don Blackman - piano (tracks 8 & 9)
- Ed Cherry - guitar
- Keter Betts - bass
- Jimmy Cobb - drums
