= The Soul Brotherhood =

Studio album by Charles Kynard
- Released: 1969
- Recorded: March 10, 1969
- Studio: Van Gelder Studio, Englewood Cliffs, New Jersey
- Genre: Jazz
- Length: 40:03
- Label: Prestige; PR 7630
- Producer: Bob Porter

Charles Kynard chronology
Professor Soul (1968)	The Soul Brotherhood (1969)	Reelin' with the Feelin' (1970)

The Soul Brotherhood is an album by organist Charles Kynard which was recorded in 1969 and released on the Prestige label.

== Reception ==
Professional ratings
Review scores
Source	Rating
Allmusic	4.5/5 stars
The Penguin Guide to Jazz Recordings	2.5/4 stars

Allmusic awarded the album 4½ stars stating "From the title track, Kynard has the proceedings firmly in hand, his sweeping right hand carries both the middle and the high registers of the instrument in a flighty idiomatic spiral of harmonic invention that never leaves its root in the blues".

== Track listing ==
All compositions by Charles Kynard except as noted

1. "The Soul Brotherhood" - 6:06
2. "Big City" (Marvin Jenkins) - 7:22
3. "Jealjon" - 7:40
4. "Piece O' Pisces" (David "Fathead" Newman) - 10:00
5. "Blue Farouq" (Blue Mitchell) - 8:55

== Personnel ==
- Charles Kynard - organ
- Blue Mitchell - trumpet
- David "Fathead" Newman - tenor saxophone
- Grant Green - guitar
- Jimmy Lewis - electric bass
- Mickey Roker - drums
