= Professor Soul =

Studio album by Charles Kynard
- Released: 1968
- Recorded: August 6, 1968; RCA Victor Studios, Los Angeles, California
- Genre: Jazz
- Label: Prestige; PR 7599
- Producer: Bob Porter

Charles Kynard chronology
Warm Winds (1964)	Professor Soul (1968)	The Soul Brotherhood (1969)

Professor Soul is an album by organist Charles Kynard which was recorded in 1968 and released on the Prestige label.

== Reception ==
Professional ratings
Review scores
Source	Rating
Allmusic	4.5/5 stars

Allmusic awarded the album 4½ stars calling it "This 1968 gem".

== Track listing ==
All compositions by Charles Kynard except as indicated

1. "Professor Soul" - 6:47
2. "Cristo Redentor" (Duke Pearson) - 4:34
3. "Song of Delilah" (Jay Livingston, Ray Evans, Victor Young) - 6:45
4. "Sister Lovie" (Johnny Kirkwood, J. Allen) - 5:42
5. "By The Time I Get to Phoenix" (Jimmy Webb) - 7:50
6. "J.C" - 5:27

== Personnel ==
- Charles Kynard - organ
- Cal Green - guitar
- Johnny Kirkwood - drums
