= Wa-Tu-Wa-Zui (Beautiful People) =

Studio album by Charles Kynard
- Released: 1971
- Recorded: December 14, 1970
- Studio: Van Gelder Studio, Englewood Cliffs, New Jersey
- Genre: Jazz
- Length: 37:13
- Label: Prestige; PR 7796
- Producer: Bob Porter

Charles Kynard chronology
Afro-Disiac (1970)	Wa-Tu-Wa-Zui (Beautiful People) (1971)	Charles Kynard (1971)

Wa-Tu-Wa-Zui (Beautiful People) is an album by organist Charles Kynard which was recorded in 1970 and released on the Prestige label.

== Reception ==
Professional ratings
Review scores
Source	Rating
Allmusic	4.5/5 stars

Richie Unterberger of Allmusic called it "a solid album that occasionally catches fire".

== Track listing ==
1. "Wa-Tu-Wa-Zui (Beautiful People)" (Richard Fritz) - 7:50
2. "Winter's Child" (Fritz) - 4:33
3. "Zebra Walk" (Kynard) - 6:10
4. "Something" (George Harrison) - 9:40
5. "Change Up" (Kynard) - 9:00

== Personnel ==
- Charles Kynard - organ, electric piano
- Virgil Jones - trumpet
- Rusty Bryant - tenor saxophone
- Melvin Sparks - guitar
- Jimmy Lewis - electric bass
- Idris Muhammad (tracks 1–3 & 5), Bernard Purdie (track 4) - drums
- Richard Fritz - arranger (tracks 1 & 2)
