= Natural Soul =

Studio album by Buddy Terry
- Released: 1968
- Recorded: November 15, 1967
- Studio: Van Gelder Studio, Englewood Cliffs, NJ
- Genre: Jazz
- Length: 40:52
- Label: Prestige; PR 7541
- Producer: Cal Lampley

Buddy Terry chronology
| Electric Soul! (1967) | Natural Soul (1968) | Awareness (1971) |

Natural Soul (subtitled Natural Woman) is an album by American saxophonist Buddy Terry recorded in 1967 and released on the Prestige label.

== Reception ==
Professional ratings
Review scores
| Source | Rating |
|---|---|
| Allmusic | 3/5 stars |

The Allmusic site awarded the album 3 stars.

== Track listing ==
All compositions by Buddy Terry except as noted

1. "A Natural Woman" (Carole King, Gerry Goffin, Jerry Wexler) – 3:30
2. "Natural Soul (Sunday Go to Meeting Blues)" – 6:00
3. "Pedro, the One Arm Bandit" – 5:37
4. "Don't Be So Mean" – 5:35
5. "The Revealing Time" – 12:35
6. "Quiet Days and Lonely Nights" – 7:35

== Personnel ==
- Buddy Terry – tenor saxophone, flute
- Larry Young – piano, organ
- Eddie Gladden – drums
- Woody Shaw – trumpet, flugelhorn (tracks 2, 4 & 5)
- Joe Thomas – tenor saxophone, flute (track 1)
- Robbie Porter – baritone saxophone (tracks 1 & 2)
- Jiggs Chase – organ (track 1)
- Wally Richardson – guitar (tracks 1 & 2)
- Jimmy Lewis – electric bass (track 1)
- The Terry Girls – vocals (track 1)
