= Herman Riley =

- Born: August 31, 1933; New Orleans, Louisiana, U.S.
- Died: April 14, 2007; Los Angeles, California
- Genres: Jazz
- Occupation: Musician
- Instrument: Saxophone
- Years active: 1960–2007

Herman Riley (August 31, 1933 – April 14, 2007) was a jazz saxophonist who was a studio musician in Los Angeles. He worked with Gene Ammons, Lorez Alexandria, Count Basie, Bobby Bryant, Donald Byrd, Benny Carter, Quincy Jones, Shelly Manne, Blue Mitchell, and Joe Williams. He died of heart failure in Los Angeles at the age of 73.

== Discography ==
- Herman (1986)

=== As sideman ===
With Bobby Bryant

- 1967 Ain't Doing Too B-A-D
- 1971 Swahili Strut

With Blue Mitchell

- The Last Tango = Blues (Mainstream, 1973)
- Blues' Blues (Mainstream, 1972)
- Graffiti Blues (Mainstream, 1973)
- African Violet (Impulse!, 1977)
- Summer Soft (Impulse!, 1978)

With Lorez Alexandria

- 1980 Sings the Songs of Johnny Mercer, Vol. 1
- 1984 Sings the Songs of Johnny Mercer, Vol. 2: Harlem Butterfly
- 1984 Sings the Songs of Johnny Mercer, Vol. 3: Tangerine
- 1992 I'll Never Stop Loving You

With Roger Neumann

- 1983 Introducing Roger Neumann's Rather Large Band
- 1993 Instant Heat

With Kenny Burrell

- 1994 Collaboration
- 2007 75th Birthday Bash Live!
- 2003 Blue Muse

With Charles Wright

- 2004 High Maintenance Woman
- 2006 Finally Got It... Wright

With Jimmy Smith

- 1989 Prime Time
- 1993 Sum Serious Blues
- 2001 Dot Com Blues

With others

- 1967 One More Time, Della Reese
- 1968 Hard Times, Roy Brown
- 1971 Head On, Bobby Hutcherson
- 1971 Free Again, Gene Ammons
- 1974 Live & in Concert, Four Tops
- 1976 Albert, Albert King
- 1978 The Live at the Century Plaza, Frank Capp
- 1978 Where Go the Boats, John Handy
- 1979 Tango Palace, Dr. John
- 1981 Swing Street Cafe, Joe Sample/David T. Walker
- 1981 The Way I Am, Billy Preston
- 1981 Touch, Gladys Knight & the Pips
- 1986 At Vine St. Live, Maxine Sullivan
- 1987 Digital Duke, Mercer Ellington
- 1988 The Singer, Richard B. Boone
- 1989 The Fabulous Baker Boys, Dave Grusin
- 1989 Boogie Down, Ernestine Anderson
- 1991 Fine and Mellow, Ruth Brown
- 1992 Calamba, Andy Simpkins Quintet
- 1995 Time After Time, Etta James
- 2000 Everybody's Talkin' Bout Miss Thing, Lavay Smith & Her Red Hot Skillet Lickers
- 2005 The Jazz Composer's Songbook, John Heard
