= The Waller Creek Boys =

The Waller Creek Boys were an Austin, Texas folk music band formed in 1962. The band lineup was made up of; Janis Joplin: autoharp, Lanny Wiggins: guitar and vocals, and Powell St. John: vocals and harmonica.
