= Mainstream Records =

American record label

- Founded: 1964
- Founder: Bob Shad
- Defunct: 1978
- Status: active
- Genre: Various
- Country of origin: U.S.
- Official website: www.mainstreamrecordsgroup.com

Mainstream Records is an American record company and independent record label founded by producer Bob Shad in 1964.

Mainstream's early releases were reissues from Commodore Records. Its catalogue grew to include Bob Brookmeyer, Maynard Ferguson, Jim Hall, Helen Merrill, Carmen McRae, Jimmy Raney, Zoot Sims, Clark Terry, and Sarah Vaughan. Janis Joplin, with Big Brother and the Holding Company, Ted Nugent & the Amboy Dukes first appeared on Mainstream.

In 1978, Mainstream ceased activities. Bob Shad died in 1985. In 1990, the label was restarted by his daughter, Tamara, and Humphrey Walwyn, the former head of BBC Records. It was bought by Legacy Recordings in 1993 and purchased back by the Shad family in the early 2000s. The label is now run by Shad's granddaughter Mia Apatow, with the help of her brother Judd Apatow.

== Discography ==
=== 56000/S6000 series (12" LPs) ===
The Mainstream 56000/S6000 Series commenced in 1964 when the label was established by Bob Shad and ran until 1971 and initially reissued material from Commodore Records and Time Records (an earlier Bob Shad label) in addition to some new jazz recordings, then soundtracks, before branching into psychedelic rock around 1966.

Catalog number	Title	Artist	Notes
56000/S6000	The Commodore Recordings 1939, 1944	Billie Holiday	
56001/S6001	Begin the Beguine	Eddie Heywood	
56002/S6002	Influence of Five	Various Artists	Coleman Hawkins, Lester Young, Ben Webster, Don Byas, Chu Berry
56003/S6003	Dixieland-New Orleans	Various Artists	Jack Teagarden, Pee Wee Russell, Eddie Condon, Wild Bill Davison & Others
56004/S6004	Town Hall Concert	Various Artists	Gene Krupa, Charlie Ventura, Bill Coleman, Red Norvo, & Others
56005/S6005	The Soil and the Sea	Various Artists	Pete Seeger, Woody Guthrie, Peter Hawes, Lee Hays
56006/S6006	I'm Lost	Dottie Clark	
56007/S6007	Boss of the Blues	Charles Brown	
56008/S6008	Chairmen of the Board	Various Artists	Art Tatum, Fats Waller, Teddy Wilson, Joe Bushkin, Mel Powell, Jess Stacy
56009/S6009	52 Street	Various Artists	Billie Holiday, Ben Webster, and Others
56010/S6010	Dixieland-Chicago Style	Various Artists	Muggsy Spanier, Russell, & Others
56011/S6011	Era of the Clarinet	Various Artists	Pee Wee Russell, Edmund Hall, Irving Fazola, Benny Goodman, Tony Parenti, George Lewis
56012/S6012	Lester Young & Kansas City Six	Lester Young	
56013/S6013	Two Jims and Zoot	Jimmy Raney, Zoot Sims & Jim Hall	
56014/S6014	The Artistry of Helen Merrill	Helen Merrill	
56015/S6015	A Taste of Honey	Morgana King	
56016	The Songs of Kurt Weill	Felicia Sanders	Reissue of Time 2007
56017/S6017	Era of the Swing Trumpet	Various Artists	Eldridge, Hackett, Jonah Jones, Page, Williams, & DeParis
56018/S6018	Town Hall Concert Volume 2	Various Artists	Krupa & Ventura 3, Stuff Smith, Red Norvo, Wilson, Phillips, Bert, Rogers, Sachs, Palmieri, Stewart, Powell, Krupa, Ventura, & Walthers
56019/S6019	Tenor Hierarchy	Various Artists	Coleman Hawkins, Chu Berry, Ben Webster, Frank Wess, Phillips, Don Byas
56020/S6020	Jelly Roll Morton	Jelly Roll Morton	
56021/S6021	Bahutu Chant & Dancers	Bahutu Chant & Dancers	
56022/S6022	Once Upon a Time	Billie Holiday & Teddy Wilson	
56023/S6023	Expressions East	John Berberian	
56024/S6024	Legend	Eddie Condon	
56025/S6025	Look at Yesterday	Various Artists	Stan Getz, Gerry Mulligan, Buddy Stewart, Paul Quinichette, Jimmy Raney, Wardell Gray
56026/S6026	Legend	Pee Wee Russell	
56027/S6027	Legend	Willie "The Lion" Smith	
56028/S6028	Second to None	Carmen McRae	
56029/S6029	Riverboat Jazz	Juggy's Jazz Band	
56030/S6030	August Child	Sylvia Copeland	
56031/S6031	Color Him Wild	Maynard Ferguson	
56032/S6032	Organ Out Loud	Gene Ludwig	
56033/S6033	The Award Winner	Frank Wess	
56034/S6034	Ruth Brown '65	Ruth Brown	
56035/S6035	Ballads My Way	Charles Brown	
56036/S6036	Corcovado Trumpets	Vic Schoen	
56037/S6037	Meditations	Coleman Hawkins	
56038/S6038	Sittin' In	Chu Berry	
56039/S6039	Legend	Bunk Johnson	
56040/S6040	The Blues	Lightnin' Hopkins	Reissue of Time T/7004
56041/S6041	Tiger Tail	Stanley Turrentine	Reissue of Time 52086
56042/S6042	Now	Cleo Bradford	
56043/S6043	Tonight	Clark Terry Bob Brookmeyer Quintet	
56044/S6044	Haven't We Met?	Carmen McRae	
56045/S6045	The Blues Roar	Maynard Ferguson	
56046/S6046	Yancy	Emily Yancy	
56047/S6047	Oud Artisty	John Berberian	
56048/S6048	It's Time We Met	Terry Gibbs	
56049/S6049	Home Town Blues	Sonny Terry & Brownie McGhee	
56050/S6050	Vibrations	Jimmy Ricks	
56051/S6051	Latin Au Go Go	Joe Cain	
56052/S6052	Miss Morgana King	Morgana King	
56053/S6053	The Collector	Maurice Jarre	Soundtrack to The Collector
56054/S6054	The Power of Positive Swinging	Clark Terry Bob Brookmeyer Quintet	
56055/S6055	We Three Trio	We Three Trio	
56056/S6056	Baby the Rain Must Fall	Elmer Bernstein	Soundtrack to Baby the Rain Must Fall
56057/S6057	The Moment of Truth	Piero Piccioni	Soundtrack to The Moment of Truth
56058/S6058	Wonderful Life	Irene Kral	
56059/S6059	The Creeper	Dennis Budimir	
56060/S6060	The Maynard Ferguson Sextet	Maynard Ferguson	
56061/S6061	King Rat	John Barry	Soundtrack to King Rat
56062/S6062	Juliet of the Spirits	Nino Rota	Soundtrack to Juliet of the Spirits
56063/S6063	Great Original Soundtracks & Movie Themes	Various Artists	
56064/S6064	The Heroes of Telemark	Malcolm Arnold	Soundtrack to The Heroes of Telemark
56065/S6065	Woman Talk	Carmen McRae	
56066/S6066	Mumbles	Clark Terry	
56067/S6067	The Lollipop Cover	Ruby Raksin	
56068/S6068	A Patch of Blue	Jerry Goldsmith	Soundtrack to A Patch of Blue
56069/S6069	Comic Book Heroes	Capes and Masks Orchestra	
56070/S6070	The Square Root of Zero	Elliot Kaplan	
56071/S6071	The 10th Victim	Piero Piccioni	Soundtrack to The 10th Victim
56072/S6072	That Man in Istanbul	Georges Garvarentz|	Soundtrack to That Man in Istanbul
56073/S6073	The Trouble with Angels	Jerry Goldsmith	Soundtrack to The Trouble with Angels
56074/S6074	I've Lost My Yo-Yo	Brandywine Singers	
56075/S6075	Pow! Jeannie Trevor Sings	Jeanne Trevor	
56076/S6076	Award Winning Original Motion Picture Soundtracks & Themes	Various Artists	
56077/S6077	Stagecoach	Jerry Goldsmith	Soundtrack to Stagecoach
56078/S6078	Harper	Johnny Mandel	Soundtrack to Harper
56079/S6079	Detectives & the Agents & Great Suspense Motion Picture Themes	Various Artists	
56080/S6080	Walk Don't Run	Quincy Jones	Soundtrack to Walk, Don't Run
56081/S6081	The Blue Max	Jerry Goldsmith	Soundtrack to The Blue Max
56082/S6082	The Shop on Main Street	Zdeněk Liška	Soundtrack to The Shop on Main Street
56083/S6083	Walk on the Wide Side	Elmer Bernstein	Soundtrack to Walk on the Wild Side; Rerelease of Choreo A4ST
56084/S6084	Alfie	Carmen McRae	
56085/S6085	Bitter Acid	Mauricio Smith	
56086/S6086	Gingerbread Men	Clark Terry/Bob Brookmeyer Quintet	
56087/S6087	Songs of Inspiration	Bill Brown	
56088/S6088	The Wrong Box	John Barry	Soundtrack to The Wrong Box
56089/S6089	Chaplin's Art of Comedy	Elias Breeskin	Soundtrack to Chaplin's Art of Comedy
56090/S6090	Gypsy Girl	Milton DeLugg	Soundtrack to Gypsy Girl
56091/S6091	In Person in San Francisco	Carmen McRae	
56092/S6092	Mira!	Hugo Montenegro	
56093/S6093	Soul of a People	Gordon Jenkins	Reissue of Time 2050
56094/S6094	A Man and His Movies	Elmer Bernstein	
56095/S6095	Hey, Listen Baby-Let's Dance	David Carroll and His Orchestra	
56096/S6096	Wine, Women and Italy	Italian Guitars	
56097	Thunder	Orquesta Los Hombres de España	
56098/S6098	Melodies of Love	Richard Hayman	
56099/S6099	Big Brother and the Holding Company	Big Brother and the Holding Company	
56100/S6100	A Pot of Flowers	Various Artists	The Wildflowers, Harbinger Complex, Euphoria and The Other Side
56101/S6101	Music from Camelot	Hugo Montenegro	
56102/S6102	The Superfine Dandelion	The Superfine Dandelion	
56103/S6103	Jelly Bean Bandits	Jelly Bean Bandits	
56104/S6104	The Amboy Dukes	The Amboy Dukes	
S6105	Tiffany Shade	Tiffany Shade	
S6106	Bohemian Vendetta	Bohemian Vendetta	
S6107	The Tangerine Zoo	The Tangerine Zoo	
S6108	The Growing Concern	The Growing Concern	
S6109	The Best of Morgana King	Morgana King	
S6110	Live & Wailing	Carmen McRae	
S6111	Slaughter on 10th Avenue	Hugo Montenegro	
S6112	Journey to the Center of the Mind	The Amboy Dukes	
S6113	The Art of Lovin'	The Art of Lovin'	
S6114	The Best of Pete Jolly	Pete Jolly	
S6115	Ellie Pop	Ellie Pop	
S6116	Outside Looking In	The Tangerine Zoo	
S6117	The Orient Express	The Orient Express	
S6118	Migration	The Amboy Dukes	
S6119	Stone Circus	Stone Circus	
S6120	Nucleus	Nucleus	
S6121	A Spoonful of Cathy Young	Cathy Young	
S6122	Last Nikle	Last Nikle	
S6123	Totie Fields Live	Totie Fields	
S6124	Hour World	The British Casuals	
S6125	The Best of the Original Amboy Dukes	The Amboy Dukes	
S6126	Drive It	Lincoln St. Exit	
S6127	Josefus	Josefus	
S6128	December's Children	December's Children	
S6129	Electric Holy Man	Henry Tree	
S6130	Freeport	Freeport	
S6131	Katmandu	Katmandu	
S6132	Lacewing	Lacewing	

=== 300 series (12" LPs) ===
The Mainstream 300 Series commenced in 1971 as the label focussed more on funk/soul and jazz artists (as well as reissuing jazz LP's originally released on Time Records) before the label folded around 1976.

Catalog number	Title	Artist	Notes
MRL 300	Rated X for Excitement	Ron Frangipane & His Orchestra	
MRL 301	Motion Pictures: The NOW Generation	Joe Scott & His Orchestra	
MRL 302	Images	Dean Christopher & His Orchestra	
MRL 303	Blood, Sweat & Brass	The Phoenix Authority	
MRL 304	The Music of Laura Nyro	Ron Frangipane	
MRL 305	Hard Mother Blues	Ernie Wilkins & His Orchestra	
MRL 306	A 65-Piece Rock Workshop	Bob Shad & The Bad Men	
MRL 307	A Symphony of Our Time	Joe Scott	
MRL 308	Hometown Blues	Sonny Terry & Brownie McGhee	Reissue of 56049
MRL 309	Carmen McRae	Carmen McRae	
MRL 310	Ray Charles, Arbee Stidham, Lil Son Jackson, James Wayne	Ray Charles, Arbee Stidham, Lil Son Jackson, James Wayne	
MRL 311	The Blues	Lightnin' Hopkins	Reissue of 56040
MRL 312	Charles Williams	Charles Williams	
MRL 313	Hip Ensemble	Roy Haynes	
MRL 314	A New Shade of Blue	Harold Land	
MRL 315	Blue Mitchell	Blue Mitchell	
MRL 316	Screamin' Blues	Maynard Ferguson	Reissue of 56045
MRL 317	Dave Hubbard	Dave Hubbard	
MRL 318	Hadley Caliman	Hadley Caliman	
MRL 319	Right On	Maxine Weldon	
MRL 320	Straight No Chaser	Clark Terry/Bob Brookmeyer Quintet	Reissue of 56043
MRL 321	A Taste of Honey	Morgana King	Reissue of 56015
MRL 322	Sings and Swings Organ	Gloria Coleman Ltd.	
MRL 323	David Young	David Young	
MRL 324	Sonny Red	Sonny Red	
MRL 325	Dizzy Gillespie and the Mitchell Ruff Duo in Concert	Dizzy Gillespie	
MRL 326	Dirty Blues	Lightnin' Hopkins	Reissue of Time 1384
MRL 327	Stan Hope	Stan Hope	
MRL 328	Sun, Moon and Stars	LaMont Johnson	
MRL 329	Charles McPherson	Charles McPherson	
MRL 330	John White	John White	
MRL 331	Charles Kynard	Charles Kynard	
MRL 332	Homecoming	Art Farmer	
MRL 333	Crankin'	Curtis Fuller	
MRL 334	Matrix	Michael Longo	
MRL 335	Strayhorn: A Mitchell-Ruff Interpretation	Mitchell-Ruff	
MRL 336	Awareness	Buddy Terry	
MRL 337	The Guerilla Band	Hal Galper	
MRL 338	Gold	Carmen McRae	
MRL 339	Chilly Wind	Maxine Weldon	
MRL 340	A Time in My Life	Sarah Vaughan	
MRL 341	Wishbone	Reggie Moore	
MRL 342	Iapetus	Hadley Caliman	
MRL 343	Vital Blue	Blue Mitchell	
MRL 344	Choma (Burn)	Harold Land	
MRL 345	Trees and Grass and Things	Charles Williams	
MRL 346	Katumbo (Dance)	Johnny Coles	
MRL 347	Angyumaluma Bongliddleany Nannyany Awhan Yi!	Clark Terry	Reissue of 56066
MRL 348	The Night Blooming Jazzmen	The Night Blooming Jazzmen	featuring Kittie Doswell and directed by Leonard Feather
MRL 349	The Loud Minority	Frank Foster	
MRL 350	Get It Together	Various Artists	Charles Kynard, Charles McPherson, Dave Hubbard, Charles Kynard, Dave and the Jay Jay's, Charles Williams and Johnny Coles
MRL 351	Senyah	Roy Haynes	
MRL 352	In Person	Carmen McRae	Reissue of Time S/2104
MRL 353	White Heat	Barry Miles	
MRL 354	Wild Bird	Hal Galper	
MRL 355	Cuore di Mama	Morgana King	
MRL 356	Pure Dynamite	Buddy Terry	
MRL 357	The Awakening	Mike Longo	
MRL 358	Otra Ves	Zoot Sims	Reissue of 56013
MRL 359	Dues	Maynard Ferguson	Reissue of 56031
MRL 360	A Time for Blues	Arbee Stidham	
MRL 361	Sarah Vaughan with Michel Legrand	Sarah Vaughan	
MRL 362	Alice Clark	Alice Clark	
MRL 363	Dance of Allegra	Pete Yellin	
MRL 364	Yesterday	Various Artists	Stan Getz, Gerry Mulligan, Wardell Gray, Dave Lambert, Benny Green, Allen Eager - Reissue of 56025
MRL 365	Siku Ya Bibi (Day of the Lady)	Charles McPherson	
MRL 366	Woga	Charles Kynard	
MRL 367	Damisi	Harold Land	
MRL 368	Driftin'Blues	Charles Brown	Reissue of 56007
MRL 369	Softly	Ruth Brown	Reissue of 56034
MRL 370	Smokin'	Curtis Fuller	
MRL 371	Gentle Eyes	Art Farmer	
MRL 372	Six by Six	Maynard Ferguson	Reissue of 56060
MRL 373	Clark Terry Bob Brookmeyet Quintet	Clark Terry Bob Brookmeyer Quintet	Reissue of 56086
MRL 374	Blues' Blues	Blue Mitchell	
MRL 375	Mannekind	Shelly Manne	
MRL 376	Family	Paul Jeffrey	
MRL 377	Ellerine	Ellerine Harding	
MRL 378	A Little Lovin'	Mel Dancy	
MRL 379	Feelin' Good	Sarah Vaughan	
MRL 380	Furioso	Reggie Moore	
MRL 381	Stickball	Charles Williams	
MRL 382	Scatbird	Barry Miles	
MRL 383	Bertha Belle Browne	Bertha Belle Browne	
MRL 384	Bananas Are Not Created Equal	Jay Berliner	
MRL 385	Ups 'n Downs	Bud Powell	
MRL 386	Daahoud	Max Roach and Clifford Brown	
MRL 387	I Want You	Carmen McRae	Compilation of tracks from 56028, 56044 and 56065
MRL 388	Freedom Jazz Dance	The Night Blooming Jazzmen	
MRL 389	Your Mama Don't Dance	Charles Kynard	
MRL 390	Watershed	Paul Jeffrey	
MRL 391	Lean on Him	Buddy Terry	
MRL 392	The Last Tango = Blues	Blue Mitchell	
MRL 393	Our Way (Tahka-Tahka)	The Barry Sisters	
MRL 394	Soul Makossa	Afrique	
MRL 395	Today's Man	Charles McPherson	
MRL 396	Windows	Jack Wilkins	
MRL 397	It's the Right Thing	Pete Yellin	
MRL 398	Inner Journey	Hal Galper	
MRL 399	March 1936	Andy Kirk and His 12 Clouds of Joy	
MRL 400	Graffiti Blues	Blue Mitchell	
MRL 401	Live in Japan	Sarah Vaughan	
MRL 402	Many Shades of Blue	Blue Mitchell	
MRL 403	Live & Doin' It	Carmen McRae	
MRL 404	Sarah Vaughan with the Jimmy Rowles Quintet	Sarah Vaughan	
MRL 405	Low Down Dirty Blues	Lightnin' Hopkins	
MRL 406	Paul Jeffrey	Paul Jeffrey	
MRL 407	Going Down Slow	Sonny Terry & Brownie McGhee / Peppermint Harris	
MRL 408	Jazz	Various Artists	Harold Land, Bobby Hutcherson, Blue Mitchell, Joe Sample, Stanley Clarke, Freddy Robinson, Hadley Caliman, Buddy Terry, Woody Shaw, Eddie Henderson
MRL 409	Billie Holiday Revisited By	Various Artists	Sarah Vaughan, Dinah Washington, Carmen McRae, Morgana King and Others
MRL 410	Guitar Players	Various Artists	
MRL 411	Frank Turba	Frank Turba	
MRL 412	Send in the Clowns	Sarah Vaughan	
MRL 413	Booty	Various Artists	Blue Mitchell, Roy Haynes, Charles Kynard, Charles Williams
MRL 414	Dr. Slingshot	The Amboy Dukes	Compilation of tracks from 56104 and S6112
MRL 415	Red Light	The Stroziers	
MRL 416	The Don Burrows Quartet at the Sydney Opera House	Don Burrows	
MRL 417	Looking Backwards to Tomorrow	Jeannie Lewis	
MRL 418	Black Blood	Black Blood	
MRL 419	More Sarah Vaughan Live in Japan	Sarah Vaughan	
MRL 420	The Lonely One	Terry Huff and Special Delivery	
MRL 421	Ted Nugent and The Amboy Dukes	Ted Nugent and The Amboy Dukes	Compilation of tracks from S6104, S6112 and S6118
