= Leonard Feather =

British musician, producer, and writer (1914–1994)

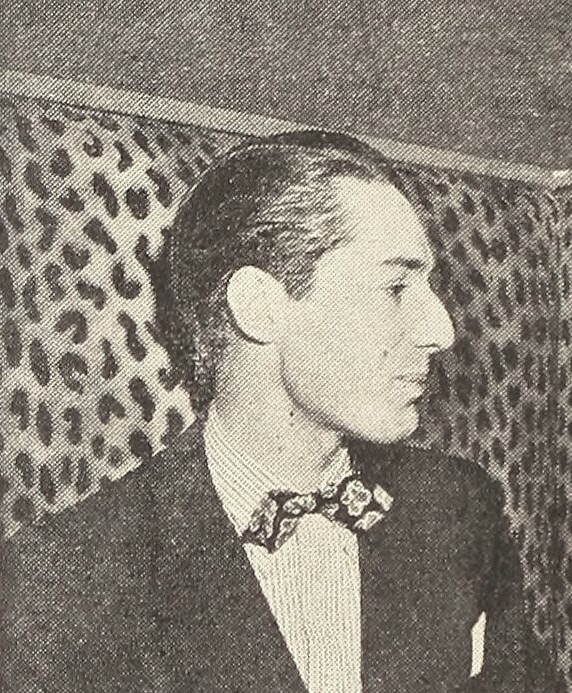
- Feather in 1946

Background information
- Born: Leonard Geoffrey Feather; 13 September 1914; London, England
- Died: 22 September 1994 (aged 80) Encino, California, U.S.
- Genre: Jazz
- Occupations: Journalist, composer
- Instrument: Piano
- Spouse: Jane Feather

Leonard Geoffrey Feather (13 September 1914 – 22 September 1994) was a British-born American jazz pianist, composer, and producer, who was best known for his music journalism and other writing.

== Biography ==
Feather was born in London, England, into an upper middle-class Jewish family. He learned to play the piano and clarinet without formal training and started writing about jazz and film by his late teens. At the age of twenty-one, Feather made his first visit to the United States, and after working in the UK and the US as a record producer finally settled in New York City in 1939, where he lived until moving to Los Angeles in 1960. Feather was co-editor of Metronome magazine and served as chief jazz critic for the Los Angeles Times until his death.

Feather made a significant contribution to the development of jazz broadcasting in Britain, first devising three Evergreens of Jazz programmes broadcast in August and September 1936, using George Scott-Wood and His Six Swingers. Leonard Feather's Swing Time, which was first broadcast National Service in January 1937, probably derived its programme title from the 1936 American RKO musical film, songs from which were featured in BBC gramophone recitals several times in December 1936. Initially trailed in the Radio Times as a programme of "Gramophone Records of Dance Music (Swing Time)". He also wrote the regular "Tempo di Jazz" column in the Radio Times in the mid-1930s.

Feather's compositions have been widely recorded, including "Evil Gal Blues" and "Blowtop Blues" by Dinah Washington, and what is possibly his biggest hit, "How Blue Can You Get?", co-written with his wife Jane, recorded by blues artists Louis Jordan and B. B. King. But it was as a writer on jazz (as a journalist, critic, historian, and campaigner) that he made his biggest mark: "Feather was for a long time the most widely read and most influential writer on jazz." Even jazz enthusiasts who did not read his books and articles would have known him from the liner notes that he wrote for hundreds of jazz albums. He was not always a neutral commentator on the jazz scene: "Feather's skill at writing glowing advance press pieces about artists he was to record, including his own compositions on the session, and then reviewing his own productions as if he were an impartial critic, was almost an art form in itself." He also hosted radio shows including Jazz Club in the early 1950s and Platterbrains that aired from 1953 to 1958. Feather organized the first Carnegie Hall jazz concerts, the only two jazz concerts at the original Metropolitan Opera House.

He wrote the lyrics to the Benny Golson jazz song "Whisper Not", which was recorded by Ella Fitzgerald on her 1966 Verve release of the same name.

In 1984, Feather was awarded an Honorary Doctorate of Music from Berklee College of Music. Feather's archives are part of the International Jazz Collections at the University of Idaho Library.

Feather died from complications of pneumonia in Encino, Los Angeles, California, at the age of 80. He is the father of lyricist and songwriter Lorraine Feather.

== Bibliography ==
- 1955: The Encyclopedia of Jazz, with foreword by Duke Ellington (Horizon Press)
- 1956: The Encyclopedia Yearbook of Jazz (Horizon)
  - 1993 reprint (Da Capo Press), ISBN 0-306-80529-4
- 1963: Laughter from the Hip co-written with Jack Tracy (Da Capo), ISBN 978-0-306-80092-4
- 1966: The Encyclopedia of Jazz in the Sixties
- 1972: From Satchmo to Miles (Stein and Day)
  - 1987 reprint (Da Capo), ISBN 1-4176-1892-2
- 1977: Inside Jazz (Da Capo), ISBN 0-306-80076-4
- 1977: The Pleasures of Jazz (Delacorte), ISBN 0-385-28786-0
- 1987: Encyclopedic Yearbook of Jazz reprint (Da Capo), ISBN 0-306-76289-7
- 1987: The Jazz Years – Earwitness to an Era (Da Capo)
- 1988: Book of Jazz (Horizon), ISBN 0-8180-1202-1
- 1999: The Biographical Encyclopedia of Jazz co-written with Ira Gitler, second (revised) edition (Oxford University Press), ISBN 0-19-507418-1
- 2000: Oxford Dictionary of National Biography

== Discography ==
- 1937–1945: Leonard Feather 1937–1945 (Classics)
- 1951: Leonard Feather's Swingin' Swedes (Prestige)
- 1954: Dixieland vs. Birdland (MGM)
- 1954: Cats Vs. Chicks (MGM)
- 1954: Winter Sequence (MGM)
- 1956: West Coast vs. East Coast (MGM)
- 1956: Swingin' on the Vibories (MGM)
- 1957: Hi-Fi Suite (MGM)
- 1957: 52nd Street (VSOP)
- 1958: Swingin' Seasons (MGM)
- 1959: Jazz from Two Sides (Concept)
- 1971: Night Blooming Jazzmen featuring Kittie Doswell (Mainstream)
- 1971: Freedom Jazz Dance (Mainstream)
- 1971–1972: Night Blooming (Mainstream)
- 1972: All-Stars (Mainstream)
- 1997: Presents Bop (Tofrec)

With Langston Hughes

- Weary Blues (MGM, 1959)
