= Powell St. John =

American singer (1940–2021)

- Born: Rayward Powell St. John; November 18, 1940; Houston, Texas, US
- Died: August 22, 2021 (aged 80) Berkeley, California, U.S.
- Occupation: Singer-songwriter
- Formerly of: Mother Earth
- Website: powellstjohn.com

Rayward Powell St. John (September 18, 1940 – August 22, 2021) was an American singer, songwriter, and visual artist, active on the mid-1960s Austin, Texas campus folk/bohemian music scene. He was an occasional member of various Austin rock groups, including St. John the Conqueroo, and wrote some songs for The 13th Floor Elevators, including "Kingdom of Heaven" and "You Don't Know (How Young You Are)", included on the band's 1966 debut, The Psychedelic Sounds of the 13th Floor Elevators. He also was a founding member, along with Tracy Nelson, of the San Francisco-based band Mother Earth.

== Biography ==
St. John began his musical career in Austin in the early 1960s, playing at parties and clubs around the University of Texas campus. Eventually, he came to work with Kenneth Threadgill of Austin's Threadgill's Bar, performing with Janis Joplin and Lannie Wiggins in a trio called The Waller Creek Boys. Later, responding to a request for material from Tommy Hall of the 13th Floor Elevators, St. John wrote six songs for their first two albums.

In 1967 Powell formed a blues and rock band in California with Tracy Nelson named Mother Earth. He stayed with the group for their first two albums, contributing several songs including "Living With the Animals", "Marvel Group", "I The Fly", "Then I'll Be Moving On" and "The Kingdom of Heaven". His songs have been recorded by such legends as Janis Joplin ("Bye, Bye Baby"), Boz Scaggs ("I'll Forever Sing the Blues"), Roky Erickson ("Right Track Now"), and Doug Sahm ("You Don’t Know").

"Powell's CD is nothing short of amazing. Over the years his music and songs have given me so much joy!" - Bill Bentley, Vanguard and Warner Brothers

"I think he's a first-rate harmonica player and I am glad he is still doing it. His songs are some of my favorites!" - Roky Erickson

"In the midst of the budding psychedelic sound, Powell's music was unique, completely original and brilliant. He gave us validation as something more than a derivative R&B band and he inspired me to stretch out beyond my desire to be Irma Thomas. I think he was the most significant and profound artist of the era. I'm so glad he's making music again." - Tracy Nelson

"Powell is one of the greatest writers." - Boz Scaggs

Austin Chronicle - December 2006 - Powell's CD is a varied mix of most of St. John's early songs - first recorded by the 13th Floor Elevators, Janis Joplin, and Boz Scaggs along with newer selections.

ASCAP's Playback Magazine - Winter 2006-2007 - In 2005, St. John was inducted into the Texas Music Hall of Fame during the South by Southwest Music Conference. This trip to Austin led to a comeback, resulting in St. John's his first solo album, "Right Track Now". The album showcased his harmonica playing and unique knack for songwriting and melody that instantly recall his early days.

San Francisco Chronicle Bay Area Bandwidth - March 2007 - Whenever a new psychedelic rock band is formed, they end up referencing St. John's material. At his annual South by Southwest appearances in Austin, admirers are invariably looking for advice or an autograph.

Austin Chronicle - March 2009 - While maybe not as iconic as some of his late 1960's Texas psychedelic contemporaries, Powell St. John is every bit the Hall of Famer they are. The former beatnik is perhaps best known for his work with the 13th Floor Elevators, not to mention Boz Scaggs and Janis Joplin - Michael Bertin

== Discography ==
=== Mother Earth ===
- Living with the Animals (1968), Mercury SR 61194
- Make A Joyful Noise (1969), Mercury SR 61226

=== With The Waller Creek Boys ===
- Powell St. John, The Sultan of Psychedelia (2017), Lysergic Sound Distributors (LSD)

=== Solo ===
- Right Track Now (2006), Sleepy Dreams Records
- On My Way to Houston (2009), Tompkins Square TSQ2233
