= Charles Williams (musician) =

American saxophonist

- Also known as: C. I. Williams
- Born: Charles Isaac Williams; July 18, 1932 (age 93)
- Origin: Halls, Tennessee
- Genres: Jazz, Soul jazz
- Occupations: Musician, bandleader
- Instrument: Alto saxophone
- Years active: 1971–1997
- Labels: Mainstream, Mapleshade

Charles Isaac Williams (born July 18, 1932) is an alto saxophonist based in New York City.

== Biography ==
Williams was born in Halls, Tennessee, and moved to Alton, Illinois, at the age of eight where he later played in the junior high school band, majored in music education at Lincoln University, in Jefferson City, Missouri, and taught orchestral music in St. Albans, Queens. He released three albums on the Mainstream label in the early 1970s. Williams also played with Clark Terry, Frank Foster, and singer Ruth Brown. In 1995 Hamiett Bluiett approached record producer Pierre Sprey's Mapleshade label and convinced them to record Williams first album in more than two decades.

== Discography ==
- Charles Williams (Mainstream, 1971)
- Trees and Grass and Things (Mainstream, 1971)
- Stickball (Mainstream, 1972)
- Snake Johnson with Ted Curson (Chiaroscuro, 1981)
- When Alto Was King (Mapleshade, 1997)
