= Buddy Terry =

American musician (1941–2019)

Edlin "Buddy" Terry (January 30, 1941 - November 29, 2019) was an American jazz musician and alto/tenor sax player. He was born in Newark, New Jersey. In the 1960s and 1970s Terry made albums for Prestige Records and Mainstream Records. He played with the group Swingadelic from 2000 to 2010. He died on November 29, 2019, at the age of 78 from a stroke.

== Discography ==
- Electric Soul! (Prestige, 1967)
- Natural Soul (Natural Woman) (Prestige, 1968)
- Awareness (Mainstream, 1971)
- Pure Dynamite (Mainstream, 1972)
- Lean on Him (Mainstream, 1973)

== With others ==
With Art Blakey and The Jazz Messengers

- Child's Dance (Prestige, 1972)

With Billy Hawks

- Heavy Soul! (Prestige, 1968)

With Groove Holmes

- I'm in the Mood for Love (Flying Dutchman, 1976)

With Harold Mabern

- A Few Miles from Memphis (Prestige, 1968)

With Joe Morello

- Another Step Forward (Ovation, 1969)

With Alphonse Mouzon

- The Essence of Mystery (Blue Note, 1973)

With Freddie Roach

- The Freddie Roach Soul Book (Prestige, 1966)

With Swingadelic

- Organ-ized! (MediaMix, 2002)
- Big Band Blues (MediaMix, 2005)
- Another Monday Night (MediaMix, 2007)

With The Tonemasters

- Goin' With The Flow (Blues Leaf, 2004)
