= Charles Kynard =

American jazz musician

Charles Kynard (20 February 1933 – 8 July 1979) was an American soul jazz/acid jazz organist born in St. Louis, Missouri.

Kynard first played piano then switched to organ and led a trio in Kansas City including Tex Johnson (flute, sax) and Leroy Anderson (drums). In 1963, he settled to Los Angeles and his band featured guitarists Cal Green and Ray Crawford, drummer Johnny Kirkwood.

== Discography ==
=== As leader ===
- Where It's At! (Pacific Jazz, 1963)
- Warm Winds with Buddy Collette (World Pacific, 1964)
- Professor Soul (Prestige, 1968)
- The Soul Brotherhood (Prestige, 1969)
- Reelin' with the Feelin' (Prestige, 1969)
- Afro-Disiac (Prestige, 1970)
- Wa-Tu-Wa-Zui (Beautiful People) (Prestige, 1971)
- Charles Kynard (Mainstream, 1971)
- Woga (Mainstream, 1972)
- Your Mama Don't Dance (Mainstream, 1973)

=== As sideman ===
- Johnny Almond, Hollywood Blues (Deram, 1969)
- Paul Jeffrey, Paul Jeffrey (Mainstream, 1974)
- Les McCann, The Gospel Truth (Fontana, 1963)
- Blue Mitchell, The Last Tango = Blues (Mainstream, 1973)
- Blue Mitchell, Booty (Mainstream, 1974)
- Howard Roberts, Goodies (Capitol, 1965)
- Howard Roberts, Something's Cookin (Capitol, 1965)
- Clifford Scott, Lavender Sax (World Pacific, 1964)
- Sonny Stitt, My Mother's Eyes (Pacific Jazz, 1963)
- Tom Waits, Blue Valentine (Asylum, 1978)
