= Bob Shad =

American record producer and record label owner (1920–1985)

Background information
- Also known as: Robert Shad
- Born: Abraham Shadrinsky; February 12, 1920
- Died: March 13, 1985 (aged 65) Beverly Hills, California, U.S.
- Occupation: Record producer
- Labels: Savoy; National; Mercury; Mainstream; Time; Brent

Robert "Bob" Shad (born Abraham Shadrinsky; February 12, 1920 – March 13, 1985) was an American record producer and record label owner. He produced the first album by Big Brother and the Holding Company (featuring Janis Joplin). Among his labels were Time Records, Brent Records, and Mainstream Records.

== Career ==
Shad's career as a producer began with working for Herman Lubinsky at Savoy Records and Al Green at National Records in the 1940s, producing Charlie Parker in addition to blues and R&B material. He founded the first of several labels, Sittin' In With, in 1948, where he produced Lightnin' Hopkins, Sonny Terry and Brownie McGhee, Smokey Hogg, Peppermint Harris, Curley Weaver, and others. In 1951, he was named director of Artists and repertoire (A&R) at Mercury Records, where he founded the EmArcy label. On the subsidiary label he produced, among others, jazz musicians Sarah Vaughan, Maynard Ferguson, the Clifford Brown/Max Roach quintet, Billy Eckstine and Dinah Washington. He also worked in pop (with Patti Page, Vic Damone, and The Platters) and blues (with Hopkins again and Big Bill Broonzy).

Shad formed the Time label in the mid-to-late 1950s and besides the jazz and cocktail pop albums, he had hits with The Bell Notes, and on his Shad label, The Knockouts and The Beau-Marks. He produced Lou Reed's first vocal recordings, "Your Love" and "Merry Go 'Round" for Time in 1962. He also formed the Brent label (primarily for West Coast signings) and had hits with Skip & Flip, The Chevrons and Bertha Tillman.

In 1964, he founded Mainstream Records, where he both reissued his old material and produced new recordings from Shelly Manne, Dizzy Gillespie, Roy Haynes, Blue Mitchell, Buddy Terry, and Pete Yellin. His credits in rock and roll include the debut albums of both Janis Joplin and Ted Nugent (The Amboy Dukes).

== Personal life ==
Shad died of a heart attack, aged 65, in Beverly Hills, California in 1985 and was buried in the Mount Sinai Memorial Park Cemetery in Los Angeles.

Shad's daughter is screenwriter (Class Action) and author Sami Shad. His grandson is the writer-director Judd Apatow. His wife, Molly Shad, appeared in Apatow's film This Is 40, playing the grandmother of Paul Rudd's character. In the Apatow-written Walk Hard: The Dewey Cox Story, the singer who Cox mimics in his first nightclub show is named after Shad.
