= Horace Ott =

American songwriter and record producer (born 1933)

- Born: April 15, 1933 (age 93); St. Matthews, South Carolina, US
- Genres: Jazz, R&B
- Occupations: Arranger, songwriter, record producer
- Instruments: Piano, Electric piano, Synthesizer

Horace Ott (born April 15, 1933) is an American jazz and R&B composer, arranger, record producer, conductor and pianist. He is noted for his work since the late 1950s with a wide variety of artists, including The Shirelles, Don Covay, Nina Simone, Houston Person, and the Village People.

== Biography ==
Born in St. Matthews, South Carolina, he learned piano and attended Wilkinson High School in Orangeburg, where he played in the school band and started performing in, and writing for, a local jazz band. He studied music at South Carolina State University, graduating in 1955, and spent two years in the US Army from 1956 to 1958, playing in a marching band.

== Career ==
=== 1950s to 1960s ===
In 1958 he moved to New York, where he worked in a factory while playing in nightclubs in the evenings. He met songwriter Luther Dixon, and had his first success writing arrangements for The Shirelles. He worked as a songwriter and arranger with musicians including Jackie Wilson, Don Covay, Hank Ballard, Dee Clark, Sam Cooke and Solomon Burke. He arranged Doris Troy's 1963 hit "Just One Look". In 1964, he co-wrote "Don't Let Me Be Misunderstood" with Bennie Benjamin and Sol Marcus; the co-writing credit was given to Ott's wife, Gloria Caldwell, because as a BMI member Ott was not permitted to work with ASCAP members. The song was included on Nina Simone's album Broadway-Blues-Ballads, in an arrangement by Ott, and was later a hit for The Animals. He continued working with Nina Simone, arranging her 1968 hit "Ain't Got No, I Got Life", and also worked as an arranger in the late 1960s with Aretha Franklin, Eric Burdon, Bessie Banks, George Benson, Mary Wells, Jimmy McGriff, and many others.

In 1969, Ott went to the UK, arriving on May 23. He was there to record Louisa Jane White, a young artist who had recently been discovered by pianist and arranger, Tommy Sanderson. At the time White was being managed by Al Grossman. Ott's role in setting up the recording session was for United States market potential.

=== 1970s onwards ===
In the 1970s, Ott continued as an arranger with jazz and R&B musicians including Houston Person, Bernard Purdie, Rusty Bryant, Gil Scott-Heron, Junior Parker, Lou Donaldson, Richard "Groove" Holmes and The Stylistics. He arranged "You Don't Have to Be a Star", a number 1 hit in 1976 for Marilyn McCoo and Billy Davis Jr. In the late 1970s, he met French writer-producers Henri Belolo and Jacques Morali, and as a result arranged all of Village People's early hits, including "Macho Man", "Y.M.C.A.", and "In the Navy", as well as recordings by The Ritchie Family. Ott has also worked with the Count Basie Orchestra, and on Broadway musicals.

== Discography ==
With Rusty Bryant

- Until It's Time for You to Go (Prestige, 1974) - keyboards, arranger and conductor

With Groove Holmes

- Night Glider (Groove Merchant, 1973) - electric piano and composer

With Etta Jones

- Sugar (Muse, 1989) - keyboards and arranger
- Christmas with Etta Jones (Muse, 1990) - keyboards and arranger

With Jimmy McGriff

- Electric Funk (Blue Note, 1969) - electric piano and composer
- The Dudes Doin' Business (Capitol, 1970) with Junior Parker - keyboards, composer, conductor and arranger
- Soul Sugar (Capitol, 1970) - electric piano
- Groove Grease (Groove Merchant, 1971) - electric piano

With Houston Person

- Houston Express (Prestige, 1970) - as composer, arranger and conductor
- Suspicions (Muse, 1980) - as composer, arranger and performer
- Heavy Juice (Muse, 1982) - arranger

With Bernard Purdie

- Soul Is... Pretty Purdie (Flying Dutchman, 1972) - keyboards, composer, arranger and conductor

With Nina Simone

- Wild Is the Wind (Philips, 1966) - as arranger

With Dakota Staton

- Madame Foo-Foo (Groove Merchant, 1972) - electric piano

With Joe Thomas

- Joy of Cookin' (Groove Merchant, 1972) - as composer, arranger and conductor

With Bob Thiele and Glenn Osser

- The Mysterious Flying Orchestra (RCA Victor, 1977) - as arranger
