= Cook County Jail =

Penitentiary in Illinois, US

Coordinates: 41.8414°N 87.6975°W

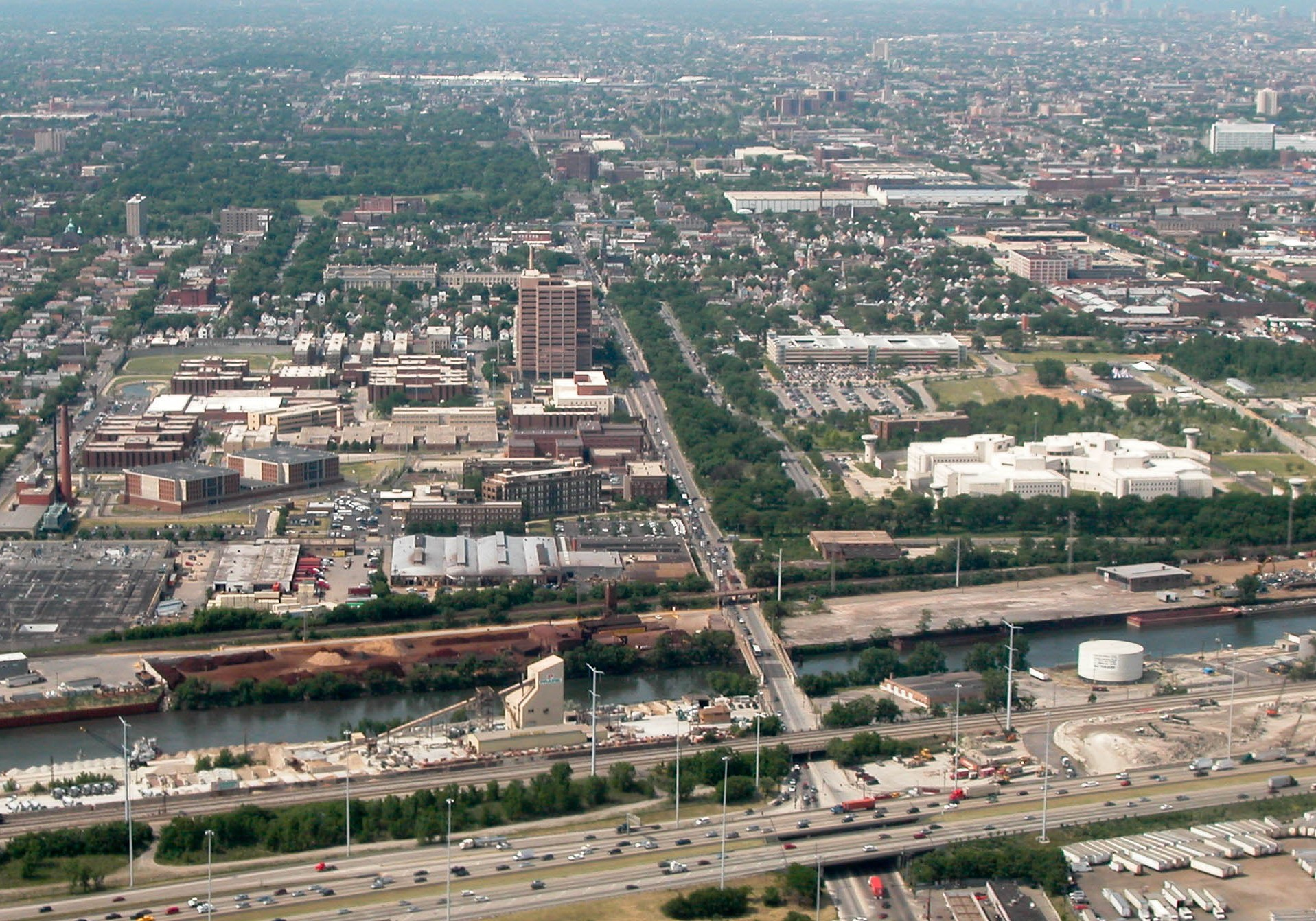
Aerial view of the Cook County Jail complex

The Cook County Jail is a county jail of Cook County, Illinois, located in South Lawndale, Chicago. It is operated by the Cook County Sheriff's Office. It is sometimes referred to as 26th and Cal or Hotel California, as its address is on 26th Street and California Avenue.

A city jail has existed on this site since after the Great Chicago Fire of 1871, but major county prisoners were not generally collocated here until closure of the old Hubbard Street Criminal Court Building and jail in 1929. Since then, a 1920s Neoclassical and Art Deco courthouse for the criminal division of the Cook County Circuit Court has operated at the South Lawndale complex.

As of 2017, Cook County operated the third-largest jail system in the United States by inmate population (after the Los Angeles County and New York City jail systems).

The jail has held several well-known and infamous criminals, including Al Capone, Tony Accardo, Frank Nitti, Larry Hoover, Jordan Tate, Jeff Fort, Richard Speck, John Wayne Gacy and the Chicago Seven. Earlier such jails have held other prisoners, including those involving the Haymarket affair.

It was one of three sites in which executions were carried out by electrocution in Illinois. Between 1928 and 1962, the electric chair was used 67 times at the jail, including the state's last electrocution, that of James Duke, on August 24, 1962. The state's other electrocutions were later carried out at the Stateville Correctional Center in Crest Hill and at the Menard Correctional Center in Chester, until the state abolished its death penalty in 2011.

== History ==
In the mid-to-late-1800s suspects in serious criminal matters were held at the site of the Cook County Criminal Court Building on Hubbard Street in a jail attached to the courthouse (the jail house was on the same block, in back of the courthouse, and is sometimes identified by reference to the corner of "Dearborn and Illinois" Streets). A separate short-stay city jail called the "Bridewell" on Polk Street, officially the House of Correction, housed less serious offenders from within the city. The city Bridewell moved to the site of the present jail complex at 29th and California in 1871 (at the time of the Great Chicago Fire) but the county's serious alleged offenders did not generally move there until the 1920s. When the two facilities began to be located together, they first gained the reputation as the 'largest concentration of inmates in the free world.' Later, the County and City jails were institutionally merged by the Illinois legislature, officially called the Cook County Department of Corrections, overseen by the Cook County Sheriff's Office.

The adjacent George N. Leighton Criminal Courts Building is where the prisoners' criminal matters are heard in the Circuit Court of Cook County. A rather elaborate neoclassical and art deco inspired high-rise built in the late 1920s, the courthouse was long known by just its cross-street location "26th and Cal" (26th Street and California Avenue) and has held many high-profile cases and is often seen in films and television.

As of 2005, female prisoners needing to be isolated at the federal Metropolitan Correctional Center, Chicago (MCC Chicago) had been taken to the Cook County Jail as the security housing unit (SHU) at the former was only for males.

=== 2008 United States Department of Justice report ===
In July 2008, the civil rights division of the United States Department of Justice released a report finding that the Eighth Amendment civil rights of the inmates has been systematically violated. The report found that the CCJ failed to adequately protect inmates from harm or risk of harm from other inmates or staff; failed to provide adequate suicide prevention; failed to provide adequate sanitary environmental conditions; failed to provide adequate fire safety precautions; and failed to provide adequate medical and mental health care.

Specific alleged violations that have resulted in Federal sanctions and/or class action lawsuits include:

1. Systematic beatings by corrections officers
2. Poor food quality
3. Inmates' being forced to sleep on cell floors due to overcrowding and mismanagement (resulting in a $1,000 per inmate class-action settlement)
4. Rodent infestation and injury caused to sleeping inmates by rat and mouse bites
5. Violations of privacy during multiple invasive strip searches
6. Failure to provide adequate medical care, including failure to dispense medications
7. Invasive and painful mandatory tests for male STDs (resulting in a $200 per inmate class action settlement)
8. Unnecessarily long waiting time for discharge upon payment of bond, completion of sentence, or charges being dropped. Wait times are currently routinely in excess of 8 hours, nearly all of which is spent with many inmates packed into tiny cells.

=== Public health issues ===
One of the largest clusters of coronavirus disease 2019 (COVID-19) cases in the entire United States occurred during the COVID-19 pandemic. On April 3, 2020, the civil rights law firm Loevy & Loevy, MacArthur Justice Center, and Civil Rights Corps filed an emergency class action lawsuit on behalf of detainees, alleging Sheriff Tom Dart failed to stop a "rapidly unfolding public health disaster" and seeking immediate release of any prisoner whose constitutional rights were being violated by their continued detention amid the coronavirus crisis. On April 27, 2020, a federal judge overruled objections from Mayor Lori Lightfoot and Sheriff Tom Dart in a sweeping preliminary injunction that mandated the Cook County Sheriff's Office implement additional testing and social distancing measures to prevent the spread of COVID-19 at the jail. This included banning the jail from corralling new inmates into cramped "bullpens" or group housing and mandating it provide face masks to all detainees under quarantine and regularly sanitize common surfaces.

As of April 22, 2020, at least 812 confirmed COVID-19 cases were linked to the jail; due to a lack of testing, the actual number of infections linked to the jail is believed to be higher. The jail's inmate population dropped by almost one-fifth during the coronavirus pandemic after a state judge ordered a review of cases involving low-risk, primarily non-violent detainees. At least six inmates and one guard have died.

And as of 26 July 2022, there has been one case of monkeypox in the prison with an inmate testing positive for the virus which is unlikely to spread across the prison.

== In popular culture ==
The women's section of the former Cook County jail near Hubbard Street is the setting used for the musical Chicago, as well as its 2002 film adaptation. The present jail is used in segments of TV series including Chicago Fire and Better Call Saul.

B.B. King's Live in Cook County Jail album features a live recording of a concert that he performed for the jail's inmates on September 10, 1970.

A live album Concert: Friday the 13th - Cook County Jail featuring performances by jazz musicians Jimmy McGriff and Lucky Thompson was released on the Groove Merchant label in 1973

The song "My Long Walk to Jail" on Filter's 2002 album The Amalgamut includes a sample of an incoming call from Cook County Jail.

The Cook County Prison was referenced to by Elwood Blues (Dan Aykroyd) in the film The Blues Brothers as serving oatmeal to inmates.

The Cook County Prison is where Bigger Thomas is held, in Richard Wright's Native Son.

== See also ==
- COVID-19 pandemic in Illinois
- Rikers Island (New York City)
- Men's Central Jail (Los Angeles)
- Twin Towers Correctional Facility (Los Angeles)
- Harris County, Texas jails (Houston)
