= Ernie Royal =

American jazz trumpeter (1921–1983)

- Born: Ernest Andrew Royal; June 2, 1921; Los Angeles, California, U.S.
- Died: March 16, 1983 (aged 61) New York City, U.S.
- Genre: Jazz
- Occupation: Musician
- Instrument: Trumpet
- Years active: 1937–1983
- Formerly of: Les Hite; Lionel Hampton; Woody Herman; Count Basie; Duke Ellington; Wardell Gray; Stan Kenton; Charles Mingus

Ernest Andrew Royal (June 2, 1921, in Los Angeles – March 16, 1983, in New York City) was a jazz trumpeter. His older brother was the alto saxophonist and clarinetist Marshal Royal, with whom he appears on the classic Ray Charles big band recording The Genius of Ray Charles (1959).

== Career ==
Royal began in Los Angeles as a member of Les Hite's Orchestra in 1937. In the following 20 years, he would work with Lionel Hampton, Woody Herman, Count Basie, Duke Ellington, Wardell Gray, Stan Kenton, and recording as a member of the Charles Mingus Octet, with Teo Macero, John Lewis, and Kenny Clarke, among others, in 1953. He led ten albums, most of them recorded in Paris. In 1957, he became a staff musician for the American Broadcasting Company. He went on to play in The Tonight Show Band and can be heard on the Miles Davis albums Miles Ahead (1957), Porgy and Bess (1958), and Sketches of Spain (1960).

== Death ==
A resident of Teaneck, New Jersey, Royal died of cancer at Mount Sinai Hospital on March 16, 1983, aged 61.

== Discography ==
- 1953: Portraits on Standards, The Kenton Era – Stan Kenton
- 1954: Afro, Dizzy and Strings – Dizzy Gillespie
- 1955: Jazz Recital – Dizzy Gillespie
- 1955: Accent on Tenor Sax – Coleman Hawkins
- 1955: Another One – Oscar Pettiford
- 1955: Introducing Jimmy Cleveland and His All Stars – Jimmy Cleveland
- 1955: Sonny Stitt Plays Arrangements from the Pen of Quincy Jones – Sonny Stitt
- 1955: Top Brass – Ernie Wilkins
- 1956: The Hawk in Hi Fi – Coleman Hawkins
- 1956: In the Land of Hi-Fi with Julian Cannonball Adderley – Cannonball Adderley
- 1956: The Oscar Pettiford Orchestra in Hi-Fi – Oscar Pettiford
- 1956: The Drum Suite (RCA Victor, 1956) – Manny Albam-Ernie Wilkins and their Orchestra
- 1956: Salute to Satch – Joe Newman
- 1957: Miles Ahead – Miles Davis
- 1957: Phineas Newborn, Jr. Plays Harold Arlen's Music from Jamaica – Phineas Newborn, Jr.
- 1957: My Fair Lady Loves Jazz – Billy Taylor
- 1958: New Bottle Old Wine – Gil Evans
- 1958: Porgy and Bess – Miles Davis
- 1958: A Map of Jimmy Cleveland – Jimmy Cleveland
- 1958: Brass & Trio – Sonny Rollins
- 1958: Porgy & Bess Revisited – Stewart-Williams & Co.
- 1959: Brass Shout – Art Farmer
- 1959: Late Date with Ruth Brown – Ruth Brown
- 1959: The Genius of Ray Charles – Ray Charles
- 1959: The Birth of a Band!, The Great Wide World of Quincy Jones – Quincy Jones
- 1959: You and Lee – Lee Konitz
- 1959: Something to Swing About – Carmen McRae
- 1959: Portrait of the Artist – Bob Brookmeyer
- 1960: Gillespiana – Dizzy Gillespie
- 1960: Sister Salvation – Slide Hampton
- 1960: Sketches of Spain – Miles Davis
- 1960: Big Joe Rides Again – Big Joe Turner
- 1961: Perceptions – Dizzy Gillespie
- 1961: Satan in High Heels (soundtrack) – Mundell Lowe
- 1961: White Gardenia – Johnny Griffin
- 1962: The Soul of Hollywood – Junior Mance
- 1962: Cabin in the Sky – Curtis Fuller
- 1962: Listen to Art Farmer and the Orchestra – Art Farmer
- 1962: Soul Street – Jimmy Forrest
- 1962: Big Bags – Milt Jackson
- 1962: The Complete Town Hall Concert – Charles Mingus
- 1962: On My Way & Shoutin' Again!– Count Basie
- 1963: Several Shades of Jade – Cal Tjader
- 1963: For Members Only – Shirley Scott
- 1963: Latin Fever – Herbie Mann
- 1964: New Fantasy – Lalo Schifrin
- 1964: Rough House Blues – Lou Donaldson
- 1964: My Kinda Groove – Herbie Mann
- 1964: The Cat – Jimmy Smith
- 1964: J.J.! – J. J. Johnson
- 1964: Quincy Jones Explores the Music of Henry Mancini – Quincy Jones
- 1965: Quincy Plays for Pussycats – Quincy Jones
- 1965: Once a Thief and Other Themes – Lalo Schifrin
- 1965: Ray Brown / Milt Jackson – Ray Brown and Milt Jackson
- 1965: Broadway Soul – Sonny Stitt
- 1965: With Respect to Nat – Oscar Peterson
- 1965: Latin Mann – Herbie Mann
- 1965: Broadway Express – J. J. Johnson
- 1966: Happenings – Hank Jones and Oliver Nelson
- 1966: Encyclopedia of Jazz – Oliver Nelson
- 1966: The Sound of Feeling – Oliver Nelson
- 1966: Got My Mojo Workin' and Hoochie Coochie Man – Jimmy Smith
- 1966: Brass on Fire and The Soul of the City – Manny Albam
- 1966: Our Mann Flute – Herbie Mann
- 1966: Spanish Rice – Clark Terry and Chico O'Farrill
- 1966: Blue Notes – Johnny Hodges
- 1967: Glory of Love – Herbie Mann
- 1967: Half a Sixpence – Count Basie
- 1967: Don't Sleep in the Subway – Johnny Hodges
- 1967: The Board of Directors – Count Basie with The Mills Brothers
- 1967: Hip Vibrations – Cal Tjader
- 1968: Blues – The Common Ground – Kenny Burrell
- 1968: Silver Cycles – Eddie Harris
- 1968: Blues – The Common Ground – Kenny Burrell
- 1969: Shirley Scott & the Soul Saxes – Shirley Scott
- 1969: The Many Facets of David Newman – David Newman
- 1969: The Soul Explosion – Illinois Jacquet
- 1969: Soul '69 – Aretha Franklin
- 1969: Mr. Blues Plays Lady Soul – Hank Crawford
- 1970: Houston Express – Houston Person
- 1970: Louis Armstrong and His Friends − Louis Armstrong
- 1970: 3 Shades of Blue – Johnny Hodges
- 1970: The Leon Thomas Album – Leon Thomas
- 1971: My Way – Gene Ammons
- 1971: Blues in Orbit – Gil Evans
- 1971: What's Going On – Johnny "Hammond" Smith
- 1972: Soul Is... Pretty Purdie – Bernard Purdie
- 1972: Joy of Cookin' – Joe Thomas
- 1972: B. B. King, Guess Who (ABC)
- 1972: Melvin Sparks, Akilah! (Prestige)
- 1972: Houston Person, Sweet Buns & Barbeque (Prestige, 1973)
- 1973: David Newman, The Weapon (Atlantic, 1973)
- 1973: Randy Weston, Tanjah (Polydor, 1974)
- 1973: O'Donel Levy, Simba (Groove Merchant, 1974)
- 1974: New Groove – Groove Holmes
- 1974: 10 Years Hence – Yusef Lateef
- 1974: Oliver Edward Nelson in London with Oily Rags – Oliver Nelson
- 1975: There Comes a Time – Gil Evans
- 1977: Color as a Way of Life – Lou Donaldson
- 1978: Gil Evans Live at the Royal Festival Hall London 1978 – Gil Evans
