= The Roar of '74 =

Studio album by Buddy Rich
- Released: 1974
- Recorded: October 6 & 13, 1973
- Studio: Bell Sound, New York City
- Genre: Jazz
- Length: 40:37
- Label: Groove Merchant
- Producer: Sonny Lester

Buddy Rich chronology
Stick It (1972)	The Roar of '74 (1974)	Very Live at Buddy's Place (1974)

Professional ratings
Review scores
Source	Rating
Allmusic	4/5 stars
DownBeat	4.5/5 stars

The Roar of '74 is a studio album by Buddy Rich, with his big band, released on the Groove Merchant Records label in the United States. The album was released in the UK in 1974 on the Mooncrest label by B & C Records.

== Reception ==
DownBeat assigned the release 4.5 stars. Reviewer James Schaffer noted that Rich takes no solos on any of the tracks. "Hearing Buddy play as only the drummer in a big band is something, especially when it’s his band. The sound is one of a total concept of no real “stars," just a very tight, hard-driving band".

== Track listing ==
LP side A

1. "Nutville" (Horace Silver) – 4:47
2. "Kilimanjaro Cookout" (Manny Albam) – 6:14
3. "Big Mac" (Ernie Wilkins) – 5:44
4. "Backwoods Sideman" (John La Barbera) – 4:29

LP side B

1. "Time Check" (Don Menza) – 3:45
2. "Prelude to a Kiss" (Duke Ellington, Mack Gordon, Irving Mills) – 3:32
3. "Waltz of the Mushroom Hunters" (Greg Hopkins) – 7:16
4. "Senator Sam" (Wilkins) – 4:40

== Personnel ==
The Buddy Rich big band

- Joe Romano – alto saxophone
- Bob Martin – alto saxophone
- Pat La Barbera – tenor saxophone, soprano saxophone
- Bob Crea – tenor saxophone
- John Laws – baritone saxophone
- Charley Davis – trumpet
- Larry Hall – trumpet
- Greg Hopkins – trumpet
- John Hoffman – trumpet
- Alan Kaplan – trombone
- Keith O'Quinn – trombone
- John Leys – trombone, bass trombone
- Joe Beck – guitar
- Buddy Budson – piano
- Tony Levin – electric bass guitar
- Buddy Rich – drums
- Jimmy Maeulen – conga
- Sam Woodyard – percussion
