= Jack Wilkins =

American jazz guitarist (1944–2023)

- Birth name: Jack Rivers Lewis
- Born: June 3, 1944; Brooklyn, New York, U.S.
- Died: May 5, 2023 (aged 78)
- Genres: Jazz
- Occupation(s): Musician, educator
- Instrument: Guitar
- Years active: 1950s–2023
- Labels: Mainstream, Music Masters, CTI, Chiaroscuro
- Website: www.jackwilkins.com

Jack Rivers Lewis (June 3, 1944 – May 5, 2023), known professionally as Jack Wilkins, was an American jazz guitarist.

== Career ==
A native of New York City, Wilkins grew up listening to his parents' music, such as Ella Fitzgerald, Frank Sinatra, and Billie Holiday. He started playing guitar when he was thirteen. He had an older cousin who played albums for him by Charlie Christian, Tal Farlow, Django Reinhardt, and Johnny Smith. He cited Smith's Designed for You as one of the albums that meant the most to him, in addition to Sounds of Synanon by Joe Pass, Poll Winners by Barney Kessel, The Swinging Guitar of Tal Farlow, and Interpretations of Tal Farlow.

While still in his teens, he worked as a guitarist in bands led by Les Elgart, Larry Elgart, Warren Covington, and Sammy Kaye.

Wilkins worked with Dan Armstrong, Lew Soloff, Lew Tabackin, and Lloyd Wells. In his twenties, he worked as a vibraphonist. He formed the band The Jazz Partners and played vibes with pianist Barry Manilow, who admired the work of Bill Evans, Oscar Peterson, and Barney Kessel. Wilkins and Manilow arranged songs from Kessel's albums for their group. A copy of his first solo album, Windows (Mainstream, 1973), found its way into the hands of Buddy Rich's manager. Wilkins then became a member of the Buddy Rich septet.

Wilkins also worked with Kenny Barron, Frank Foster, Sonny Fortune, Stan Getz, Dizzy Gillespie, Lionel Hampton, Jimmy McGriff, Sal Nistico, Zoot Sims, Sonny Stitt, Jack DeJohnette, Phil Woods, and the Brecker Brothers.

Wilkins died on May 5, 2023, at the age of 78.

== Discography ==
=== As leader ===
- Windows (Mainstream, 1973)
- You Can't Live Without It (Chiaroscuro, 1977)
- Opal (CTI, 1983)
- Captain Blued (Greene Street, 1984)
- Call Him Reckless (Musicmasters, 1989)
- Alien Army (Musicmasters, 1991)
- Mexico (CTI, 1992)
- Merge (Chiaroscuro, 1992)
- Trioart (Arabesque, 1998)
- Bluesin (String Jazz, 1999)
- Just the Two of Us with Gene Bertoncini (Chiaroscuro, 2000)
- Reunion (Chiaroscuro, 2001)
- Christmas Jazz Guitar (Mel Bay, 2002)
- Until It's Time (MAXJAZZ, 2009)

=== As sideman ===
With Nancy Harrow

- Anything Goes (Audiophile, 1979)
- Two's Company (Inner City, 1984)
- Winter Dreams (Artists House, 2003)

With Buddy Rich

- Very Live at Buddy's Place (Groove Merchant, 1974)
- The Bull (Chiaroscuro, 1980)
- Tuff Dude (Denon, 1986)

With others

- Chet Baker & Jim Hall & Hubert Laws, Studio Trieste (CTI, 1982)
- Peter Bernstein, We Remember Tal (J-Curve, 1999)
- Bob Brookmeyer, The Bob Brookmeyer Small Band (Gryphon, 1978)
- Bubba Brooks, Polka Dots and Moonbeams (TCB, 2002)
- Jay Clayton, In and Out of Love (Sunnyside, 2010)
- Chris Connor, I Walk with Music (HighNote, 2002)
- Albert Dailey, The Day After the Dawn (Columbia, 1972)
- Sonny Fortune, Serengeti Minstrel (Atlantic, 1977)
- Astrud Gilberto, That Girl from Ipanema (Image, 1977)
- Lionel Hampton, Hamp's Blues (LRC, 1986)
- Julius Hemphill, Julius Hemphill Big Band (Elektra Musician, 1988)
- Julius Hemphill, The Boyé Multi-National Crusade for Harmony (New World, 2021)
- Earl Hines, Swingin' Away (Black Lion,)
- Paul Jeffrey, Watershed (Mainstream, 1973)
- Morgana King, Everything Must Change (Muse, 1979)
- Morgana King, Higher Ground (Muse, 1980)
- Amy London, Bridges (FiveCut, 2014)
- The Manhattan Transfer, Swing (Atlantic, 1997)
- Barry Miles, Barry Miles (Poppy Music, 1970)
- Charles Mingus, Me Myself an Eye (Atlantic, 1979)
- Charles Mingus, Something Like a Bird (Atlantic, 1980)
- Mingus Big Band, I Am Three (Sunnyside, 2005)
- Sal Nistico & Kenny Barron & Anthony Jackson & Buddy Rich, Transition (Groove Merchant, 1974)
- Jonathan Schwartz, Alone Together (Muse, 1977)
- Dave Tofani, Nights at the Inn (SoloWinds, 2007)
- Pete Yellin, It's the Right Thing (Mainstream, 1973)
