= Groove Grease =

Studio album by Jimmy McGriff
- Released: 1971
- Recorded: 1971
- Studio: New York City
- Genre: Jazz-funk
- Label: Groove Merchant; GM 503
- Producer: Sonny Lester

Jimmy McGriff chronology
Jimmy McGriff with Junior Parker (1971)	Groove Grease (1971)	Let's Stay Together (1972)

Groove Grease is an album by American jazz organist Jimmy McGriff featuring performances recorded in 1971 and released on the Groove Merchant label.

== Reception ==
Professional ratings
Review scores
Source	Rating
Allmusic	3.5/5 stars

Allmusic's Rob Theakston said: "This 1971 session finds McGriff continuing to do like so many other jazz musicians of the time: embrace and adapt to the emergence of funk and soul into mainstream music, and recontextualize it in a jazz arena. The results are an unsurprisingly delicious slice of jazz-funk made from the finest ingredients. ... While McGriff's adventurous side is slightly tamed, it's that willingness to improv and blend together as a cohesive unit that makes Groove Grease such a tasty statement that is consistently fresh with repeated listenings".

== Track listing ==
All compositions by Jimmy McGriff except where noted

1. "Groove Grease" – 3:33
2. "The Bird" (Jimmy McGriff, Sonny Lester) – 3:14
3. "Plain Brown Bag" – 3:36
4. "There Will Never Be Another You" (Harry Warren, Mack Gordon) – 4:48
5. "Canadian Sunset" (Eddie Heywood, Norman Gimbel) – 3:30
6. "Mr. Lucky" (Henry Mancini) – 3:44
7. "Moonglow" (Will Hudson, Irving Mills, Eddie DeLange) – 3:24
8. "Red Sails in the Sunset" (Hugh Williams, Jimmy Kennedy) – 3:07
9. "Secret Love" (Sammy Fain, Paul Francis Webster) – 4:32

== Personnel ==
- Jimmy McGriff – organ
- Murray Watson – trumpet
- Cliff Davis – tenor saxophone, flute
- Johnny Beard – baritone saxophone, flute
- Horace Ott – electric piano
- Everett Barksdale, Wayne Bennett – guitar
- Richard Davis, Richard Evans – bass
- Marion J. Booker – drums
- Lawrence Killian – percussion
