= Joy of Cookin' =

Studio album by Joe Thomas
- Released: 1972
- Recorded: 1972
- Studio: New York City
- Genre: Jazz
- Length: 31:05
- Label: Groove Merchant; GM 504
- Producer: Sonny Lester

Joe Thomas chronology
Joe Thomas Is the Ebony Godfather (1971)	Joy of Cookin' (1972)	Masada (1975)

Joy of Cookin' is an album by American jazz flautist Joe Thomas recorded in 1972 and released on the Groove Merchant label.

== Reception ==
Professional ratings
Review scores
Source	Rating
Allmusic	4/5 stars

Allmusic's Jason Ankeny said: "While not reaching the same heights of Joe Thomas' previous Ebony Godfather LP, the aptly titled Joy of Cookin' boasts a comparable deep-fried funk flavor, fusing the style and sensibility of blaxploitation-era soundtracks with the formal ingenuity of jazz. Horace Ott's big, bold arrangements nicely complement Thomas' sweet, fluttery flute, which navigates in and out of the melodies with the grace of a monarch butterfly".

== Track listing ==
All compositions by Joe Thomas except where noted

1. "Joyful, Joyful" (Joe Thomas, Horace Ott) − 4:20
2. "Down Home" (Horace Ott) − 4:37
3. "Chile Con Carmen" − 4:45
4. "Thank You (Fall Etin Me Be Mice Elf Agin)" (Sly Stone) − 3:32
5. "Soul Sermon" − 4:05
6. "Mike" − 5:06
7. "Dr. Ritota" − 4:40

== Personnel ==
- Joe Thomas – flute
- Horace Ott − arranger, conductor (tracks 1−3)
- Ernest Royal – trumpet (tracks 1−3)
- Garnett Brown − trombone (tracks 1−3)
- Seldon Powell – tenor saxophone (tracks 1−3)
- Arthur F. Clarke (tracks 1−3), Billy Phipps (tracks 6 & 7), Robbie Porter (tracks 4−7) – baritone saxophone
- Jiggs Chase − organ
- Jimmy Ponder (tracks 4−7), David A. Spinozza (tracks 1−3) – guitar
- Gordon H. Edwards – bass (tracks 1−3)
- Bill LaVorgna (tracks 1−3), Kenny Pollard (tracks 4−7) – drums
- Gordon Powell − congas (tracks 1−3)
