= I Offer You =

Studio album by Lucky Thompson
- Released: 1973
- Recorded: 1973
- Studio: New York City
- Genre: Jazz
- Length: 38:13
- Label: Groove Merchant; GM 517
- Producer: Sonny Lester

Lucky Thompson chronology
Concert: Friday the 13th - Cook County Jail (1973)	I Offer You (1973)

I Offer You is an album featuring performances by jazz saxophonist Lucky Thompson which was released on the Groove Merchant label.

== Reception ==
Professional ratings
Review scores
Source	Rating
Allmusic	4/5 stars

Allmusic's Scott Yanow said: "After he stopped teaching in 1974, Lucky Thompson permanently dropped out of music. ... Thompson, switching between tenor and soprano, was still very much in his musical prime at the time of this LP but apparently soon became sick of the whole music business, a major loss to jazz. He plays quite well throughout the set".

== Track listing ==
All compositions by Lucky Thompson except where noted

1. "Munsoon" − 5:07
2. "Sun Out" − 6:20
3. "Yesterday's Child" − 4:26
4. "Aliyah" − 5:05
5. "The Moment of Truth" (Tex Satterwhite, Frank Scott) − 6:35
6. "Back Home from Yesterday" − 5:58
7. "Cherokee" (Ray Noble) − 4:42

== Personnel ==
- Lucky Thompson – tenor saxophone, soprano saxophone
- Cedar Walton – electric piano, piano
- Sam Jones – bass
- Louis Hayes – drums
