= The Main Squeeze (album) =

Studio album by Jimmy McGriff
- Released: 1974
- Recorded: 1974
- Studio: New York City
- Genre: Jazz
- Length: 38:49
- Label: Groove Merchant; GM 534
- Producer: Sonny Lester

Jimmy McGriff chronology
Giants of the Organ in Concert (1973)	The Main Squeeze (1974)	Stump Juice (1975)

The Main Squeeze is an album by American jazz organist Jimmy McGriff recorded in 1974 and released on the Groove Merchant label.

== Reception ==
Professional ratings
Review scores
Source	Rating
Allmusic	2.5/5 stars

Allmusic's Jason Ankeny said: "Main Squeeze percolates but never quite boils over. It's a collection of short, sharp and oh-so-sincere funk workouts performed with both style and skill, the album simply plays its cards too close to the vest, controlling the groove but never giving in to it".

== Track listing ==
All compositions by Jimmy McGriff except where noted

1. "The Worm Turns" – 4:21
2. "The Sermon" (Jimmy Smith) – 3:08
3. "The Blues Train to Georgia" – 5:05
4. "Misty" (Erroll Garner, Johnny Burke) – 7:38
5. "The Main Squeeze" – 3:46
6. "GMI" – 4:52
7. "These Foolish Things (Remind Me of You)" (Jack Strachey, Holt Marvell, Harry Link) – 5:30
8. "Stella by Starlight" (Victor Young, Ned Washington) – 4:29

== Personnel ==
- Jimmy McGriff – organ, keyboards
- Connie Lester – alto saxophone
- Jimmy Ponder – guitar
- Eddie Gladden – drums
