= Red Beans (album) =

Studio album by Jimmy McGriff
- Released: 1976
- Recorded: September 1976
- Studio: Mediasound, New York City
- Genre: Jazz
- Length: 34:54
- Label: Groove Merchant; GM 3314
- Producer: Sonny Lester

Jimmy McGriff chronology
The Mean Machine (1976)	Red Beans (1976)	Tailgunner (1977)

Red Beans is an album by American jazz organist Jimmy McGriff recorded in 1976 and released on the Groove Merchant label.

== Reception ==
Professional ratings
Review scores
Source	Rating
Allmusic	3.5/5 stars

Allmusic's Jason Ankeny said: "'On Red Beans, Jimmy McGriff rolls out electric piano and clavinet alongside his signature Hammond B-3 to create one of the more varied and unusual sessions in his discography. Brad Baker's smooth, fusion-inspired arrangements further distance the album from McGriff's seminal soul-jazz sets, but the approach – in every sense a product of its times – suits him well, and even though the material is lightweight, with a regrettable reliance on novelty titles, McGriff's absolute mastery of the groove remains unquestioned".

== Track listing ==
All compositions by Brad Baker and Lance Quinn except where noted

1. "Red Beans" – 6:10
2. "Big Booty Bounce" – 6:12
3. "Space Cadet" (Bob Babbitt) – 5:58
4. "Cakes Alive" – 6:02
5. "Sweet Love" (Jerry Friedman) – 4:35
6. "Love Is My Life" – 6:47

== Personnel ==
- Jimmy McGriff – organ, piano, electric piano, clavinet
- Randy Brecker, Jon Faddis, Alan Rubin – trumpet
- Barry Rogers, David Taylor – trombone
- Mike Brecker, Lew Delgatto, George Young – saxophone
- Pat Rebillot – keyboards
- Lance Quinn – guitar, musical supervisor
- Jerry Friedman – guitar
- Bob Babbitt – bass
- Barry Lazarowitz, Gary Mure – drums
- Jimmy Maelen – percussion
- Carol Webb, Harold Kohan, Harry Cykman, Harry Glickman, Harry Lookofsky, John Pintavalle, Norman Carr, Peter Dimitriades, Richard Sortomme, Tony Posk – violin
- Julian Barber, Seymour Berman – viola
- Jesse Levy, Kermit Moore – cello
- Arnold McCullen, David Lasley – vocals
- Brad Baker – conductor
