= The Sweet Life (album) =

Studio album by Reuben Wilson
- Released: 1972
- Recorded: 1972
- Studio: New York, NY
- Genre: Jazz
- Length: 33:25
- Label: Groove Merchant; GM 511
- Producer: Sonny Lester

Reuben Wilson chronology
Set Us Free (1971)	The Sweet Life (1972)	The Cisco Kid (1973)

The Sweet Life is an album by American jazz organist Reuben Wilson recorded in 1972 and released on the Groove Merchant label.

== Reception ==
Professional ratings
Review scores
Source	Rating
Allmusic	4/5 stars

Allmusic's Jason Ankeny said: "After a series of sugary soul-jazz dates for Blue Note, Reuben Wilson resurfaced on Groove Merchant with The Sweet Life. The title notwithstanding, the session is his darkest and hardest-edged to date, complete with a physicality missing from previous efforts".

== Track listing ==
All compositions by Reuben Wilson except where noted.

1. "Inner City Blues" (Marvin Gaye, James Nyx Jr.) – 4:45
2. "Creampuff" – 5:30
3. "Sugar" (Stanley Turrentine, Ted Daryll) – 6:09
4. "I'll Take You There" (Albertis Isbell) – 6:25
5. "The Sweet Life" – 6:11
6. "Never Can Say Goodbye" (Clifton Davis) – 4:15

== Personnel ==
- Reuben Wilson – organ
- Bill Hardman − trumpet
- Ramon Morris − tenor saxophone
- Lloyd Davis − guitar
- Mickey Bass – bass
- Thomas Derrick − drums
