= Speak No Evil (Buddy Rich and the Big Band Machine album) =

Studio album by Buddy Rich
- Released: 1976
- Studio: RCA, New York City
- Genre: Jazz, Jazz fusion
- Label: RCA
- Producer: Richard Evans

Buddy Rich chronology
Big Band Machine (1975)	Speak No Evil (1976)	Buddy Rich Plays and Plays and Plays (1977)

Compilation / re-issue
- 2-fer BGO re-issue of Speak No Evil with Plays and Plays and Plays

Professional ratings
Review scores
Source	Rating
Allmusic	3.5/5 stars

Speak No Evil is a jazz album recorded by Buddy Rich "and the Big Band Machine" (referring to Buddy Rich's big band). It was released in 1976 and was Rich's first release for RCA Records since 1972's Stick It.

== Track listing ==
LP side A:

1. "Speak No Evil" (Richard Evans) – 3:44
2. "Yearnin' Learnin'" (Charles Stepney, Maurice White, Philip Bailey) – 5:38
3. Medley – 11:00
  1. "Storm at Sunup" (Gino Vannelli) – 6:37
  2. "Love Me Now" (Gino Vannelli) – 4:23

LP side B:

1. "Fight the Power" (Chris Jasper, Ernie Isley, Marvin Isley, O'Kelly Isley, Ronald Isley, Rudolph Isley) – 6:00
2. "They Just Can't Stop It (The Games People Play)" (Bruce Hawes, Charles Simmons, Joseph Jefferson) – 3:55
3. "Sophisticated Lady (She's a Different Lady)" (Chuck Jackson, Marvin Yancy, Natalie Cole) – 3:04
4. "Sneakin' Up Behind You" (David Sanborn, Don Grolnick, Michael Brecker, Randy Brecker, Will Lee) – 3:21
5. "How Long (Betcha' Got a Chick on the Side)" (Anita Pointer, Bonnie Pointer, June Pointer, Ruth Pointer, David Rubinson) – 3:51

== Personnel ==
- Buddy Rich – drums
- Bob Cranshaw – bass
- Morris Jennings – drums and percussion
- Ross Traut – guitar
- Kenny Barron – electric piano
- Jerry Dodgion – alto saxophone
- Dave Tofani – alto saxophone
- Joe Farrell – tenor saxophone
- Steve Marcus – tenor saxophone
- Turk Mauro – baritone saxophone
- Danny Moore – trumpet
- Victor Paz – trumpet
- Lew Soloff – trumpet
- Jon Faddis – trumpet
- Janice Robinson – trombone
- Wayne Andre – trombone
- Tom "Bones" Malone – trombone
- David Taylor – bass trombone
- Howard Johnson – tuba
- Vivian Cherry – vocals
- Lani Groves – vocals
- Rhetta Hughes – vocals
