= The Mean Machine (album) =

Studio album by Jimmy McGriff
- Released: 1976
- Recorded: 1976
- Studio: New York City, NY
- Genre: Jazz
- Length: 34:09
- Label: Groove Merchant; GM 3311
- Producer: Sonny Lester

Jimmy McGriff chronology
Stump Juice (1975)	The Mean Machine (1976)	Red Beans (1976)

The Mean Machine is an album by American jazz organist Jimmy McGriff recorded in 1976 and released on the Groove Merchant label.

== Reception ==
Professional ratings
Review scores
Source	Rating
Allmusic	2/5 stars

Allmusic's Jason Ankeny said: "Ironically enough, Mean Machine captures Jimmy McGriff at his sweetest. Employing electric piano as much as his signature organ, its grooves are disappointingly tepid, favoring a CTI-inspired smooth jazz approach at odds with McGriff's essential funkiness. Brad Baker's lush arrangements are largely to blame here, evoking the sound but not the kinetic energy of blaxploitation cinema".

== Track listing ==
1. "It Feels So Nice (Do It Again)" (Brad Baker, Lance Quinn) − 6:04
2. "The Mean Machine" (Baker, Joe Thomas) − 5:54
3. "Please Don't Take Me Out" (Baker) − 6:05
4. "Get Back' (John Lennon, Paul McCartney) − 5:30
5. "Overweight Shark Bait" (Robert Kriener) − 4:41
6. "Pogo's Stick" (Quinn) − 5:55

== Personnel ==
- Jimmy McGriff – electric piano, clavinet, synthesizer, arranger
- Joe Thomas – tenor saxophone, flute
- John Frosk, Alan Rubin − trumpet
- Tom Malone − trombone
- Lewis Del Gatto − baritone saxophone
- Pat Rebillot − keyboards
- Lance Quinn − guitar, arranger
- Cornell Dupree, Jerry Friedman − guitar
- Bob Babbitt − electric bass
- Jerry Marotta, Rick Marotta − drums
- Carlos Martin − congas
- Jimmy Maelen − percussion
- Tony Posk, John Pinntaville, Norman Carr, Harold Kohan, Rick Santhomme, Leo Kahn, Fred Buldrini, Alvin Rogers − violin
- Julien Barber, Richard Maximoff − viola
- Jesse Levy, Richard Locker − cello
- Brad Baker − arranger, conductor
