= The Dudes Doin' Business =

Studio album by Jimmy McGriff and Junior Parker
- Released: 1970
- Recorded: 1970
- Studio: New York City
- Genre: Jazz
- Length: 31:11
- Label: Capitol; ST 569
- Producer: Sonny Lester

Jimmy McGriff chronology
Electric Funk (1969)	The Dudes Doin' Business (1970)	Soul Sugar (1970)

Good Things Don't Happen Every Day
- 1972 reissue

The Dudes Doin' Business is an album by organist Jimmy McGriff and vocalist Junior Parker featuring performances recorded in 1970 and originally released on the Capitol label. The album was reissued as Good Things Don't Happen Every Day on the Groove Merchant label in 1972.

== Reception ==
Professional ratings
Review scores
Source	Rating
Allmusic	3/5 stars
Christgau's Record Guide	C+

Robert Christgau said: "A waste. Vocalist Parker, an underrated blues pro, and organist McGriff, who has a name as a soloist but is better off accompanying, should produce a more than passable record almost automatically. But not when they're burdened with strings, insipid soprano choruses, and hopelessly inappropriate material".

== Track listing ==
1. "Drownin' on Dry Land" (Mickey Gregory, Alan Jones) – 3:06
2. "Good Things Don't Happen Every Day" (Horace Ott) – 3:10
3. "Ain't That a Shame" (Fats Domino, Dave Bartholomew) – 2:48
4. "A Losing Battle" (Mac Rebennack) – 3:17
5. "It Ain't What'cha Got" (Gloria Caldwell, J. Wolf) – 2:51
6. "In the Heat of the Night" (Quincy Jones, Alan Bergman, Marilyn Bergman) – 4:44
7. "Workin'" (Ott, Al Stewart) – 3:46
8. "Oh! Darling" (John Lennon, Paul McCartney) – 3:38
9. "The Inner Light" (George Harrison) – 3:51

== Personnel ==
- Jimmy McGriff – organ
- Junior Parker – vocals, harmonica
- Horace Ott – piano, electric piano, arranger, conductor
- Cornell Dupree, Eric Gale – guitar
- Chuck Rainey – electric bass
- Bernard Purdie – drums
- Other unidentified musicians – trumpet, trombone, tenor saxophone, baritone saxophone, string section, backing vocals
