= Garnett Brown =

American jazz trombonist (1936–2021)

- Born: January 31, 1936; Memphis, Tennessee, U.S.
- Died: October 9, 2021 (aged 85) Los Angeles, California, U.S.
- Genres: Jazz
- Occupation: Trombonist
- Instrument: Trombone
- Years active: 1965–2021
- Formerly of: The Capp-Pierce Juggernaut, Brass Fever

Garnett Pompilius Brown (January 31, 1936 – October 9, 2021) was an American jazz trombonist who worked with The Crusaders, Herbie Hancock, Lionel Hampton, Earth Wind and Fire and others.

Born in Memphis, Tennessee, he graduated from the University of Arkansas at Pine Bluff and later studied film scoring and electronic music at UCLA. In 1974 he won the Down Beat Reader's poll for trombonist, and appears on the classic 1976 recording Bobby Bland and B.B. King Together Again...Live.

Brown did some work in film and television composition due to his training in the field. In 1989 he was the conductor and orchestrator for Harlem Nights.

Coincident with Kenny Burrell joining UCLA as Director of Jazz Studies in 1996, Brown co-led UCLA Jazz Ensemble I with John Clayton.

Garnett and his wife Anna had two daughters, Ariana Brown and Miranda Brown-Muir, and three grandchildren: Luca Muir, Francesca Muir and Alessandra Muir. Brown died in Los Angeles on October 9, 2021, at 85. At the time of his death, he was retired and had been diagnosed with dementia.

== Discography ==
=== As sideman ===
1962: The Outer View – George Russell

- 1962: Drumfusion – Chico Hamilton
- 1964: Nirvana – Charles Lloyd
- 1965: Slightly Latin – Roland Kirk
- 1965 Hold On, I'm Coming – Art Blakey
- 1965: Honeybuns – Duke Pearson
- 1966: Heavy!!! – Booker Ervin
- 1966: Flute By-Laws – Hubert Laws
- 1967: Lush Life – Lou Donaldson
- 1967: The Return of the Prodigal Son – Stanley Turrentine
- 1967: Introducing Duke Pearson's Big Band – Duke Pearson
- 1967: It's All Right! – Teddy Edwards
- 1968: Easterly Winds – Jack Wilson
- 1968: Manhattan Fever – Frank Foster
- 1968: Now Hear This – Duke Pearson
- 1968: Plug Me In – Eddie Harris
- 1968: Goodies – George Benson
- 1969: Crying Song – Hubert Laws
- 1969: The Prisoner – Herbie Hancock
- 1970: MCMLXX – Ray Bryant – guest on 1 track
- 1970: Music Inc. – Charles Tolliver
- 1970: 3 Shades of Blue – Johnny Hodges
- 1970: Houston Express – Houston Person
- 1970: Louis Armstrong and His Friends – Louis Armstrong
- 1971: My Way – Gene Ammons
- 1971: Plastic Dreams – Modern Jazz Quartet
- 1971: Blues in Orbit – Gil Evans
- 1971: What's Going On – Johnny "Hammond" Smith
- 1972: The London Muddy Waters Sessions – Muddy Waters
- 1972: Blue Moses – Randy Weston
- 1972: Joy of Cookin' – Joe Thomas
- 1972: Soul Is... Pretty Purdie – Bernard Purdie
- 1972: Time & Love – Jackie and Roy
- 1972: Free – Airto Moreira
- 1972: Sweet Revival – Ronnie Foster
- 1972: Morning Star – Hubert Laws
- 1973: I Want a Country Man – Dakota Staton
- 1973: The Cisco Kid – Reuben Wilson
- 1973: Night Glider – Groove Holmes
- 1973: Part of the Search – Yusef Lateef
- 1973: Charles III – Charles Earland
- 1973: Giant Box – Don Sebesky
- 1973: Sassy Soul Strut – Lou Donaldson
- 1973: Today's Man – Charles McPherson
- 1974: The Almoravid – Joe Chambers
- 1974: 10 Years Hence – Yusef Lateef
- 1974: The Fourth Dimension – Jack McDuff
- 1974: Big Bad Bo – Bo Diddley
- 1974: Until It's Time for You to Go – Rusty Bryant
- 1974: Another Beginning – Les McCann
- 1974: Crosswinds – Billy Cobham
- 1974: Journey – Arif Mardin (Atlantic)
- 1975: Man-Child – Herbie Hancock
- 1975: Brass Fever – Brass Fever
- 1975: Impact – Charles Tolliver
- 1975: Six Million Dollar Man – Richard "Groove" Holmes
- 1976: Time Is Running Out – Brass Fever
- 1976: How Can You Live Like That? – Eddie Harris
- 1976: Bobby Bland and B.B. King Together Again...Live
- 1976: Silver 'n Wood – Horace Silver
- 1979: Street Life – The Crusaders
- 1980: Night Song – Ahmad Jamal
- 1981: Lomelin – Gerald Wilson Orchestra of the 80's (Discovery)
- 1982: Jessica – Gerald Wilson's Orchestra of the 80's (Trend)
- 1984: Calafia – Gerald Wilson's Orchestra of the 80's (Trend)
- 1988: Tribute to Count Basie – The Gene Harris All Star Big Band

=== As session player ===
- 1974 Continental American – Peter Allen
