= A Thing to Come By =

Studio album by Jimmy McGriff Organ and Blues Band
- Released: 1969
- Recorded: June 17 & 18, 1969 in New York City
- Genre: Jazz
- Label: Solid State SS-18060
- Producer: Sonny Lester

Jimmy McGriff chronology
Step 1 (1968)	A Thing to Come By (1969)	The Way You Look Tonight (1969)

A Thing to Come By is an album by American jazz organist Jimmy McGriff featuring performances recorded in 1969 and originally released on the Solid State label.

== Reception ==
The Allmusic review by Stephen Cook stated "A Thing to Come By is an essential part of the Jimmy McGriff catalog".

Professional ratings
Review scores
Source	Rating
Allmusic	4.5/5 stars

== Track listing ==
All compositions by Jimmy McGriff except as indicated

1. "A Thing to Come By" - 3:55
2. "Charlotte" - 4:30
3. "Down Home on the Moon" - 10:02
4. "Oh Happy Day" (Edwin Hawkins) - 3:13
5. "Don't Let Me Lose This Dream" (Aretha Franklin, Teddy White) - 5:20
6. "Up There, Down Here" - 3:00
7. "A Thing to Come By - Part II - 4:47

== Personnel ==
- Jimmy McGriff - piano, organ
- Richard "Blue" Mitchell - trumpet
- Arthur "Fats" Theus - tenor saxophone
- Larry Frazier - guitar
- Danny Turner - alto saxophone
- Jesse Kilpatrick - drums
- [mostly told: Phil Upchurch] - electric bass
- Unknown - [?] baritone saxophone
