= Something to Listen To (Jimmy McGriff album) =

Studio album by Jimmy McGriff
- Released: 1970
- Recorded: 1970
- Genre: Jazz
- Length: 45:50
- Label: Blue Note
- Producer: Sonny Lester

Jimmy McGriff chronology
Soul Sugar (1970)	Something to Listen To (1970)	Black Pearl (1971)

Something to Listen To is an album by American jazz organist Jimmy McGriff featuring performances recorded in 1970 and released on the Blue Note label.

== Reception ==
The Allmusic review awarded the album 3 stars.

Professional ratings
Review scores
Source	Rating
Allmusic	3/5 stars

== Track listing ==
All compositions by Jimmy McGriff except as indicated

1. "(Back Home Again in) Indiana" (James F. Hanley, Ballard MacDonald) - 6:38
2. "Malcolm's Blues" - 6:14
3. "Satin Doll" (Duke Ellington, Johnny Mercer, Billy Strayhorn) - 5:59
4. "Deb Sombo" - 6:38
5. "Something to Listen To" - 4:46
6. "Shiny Stockings" (Frank Foster) - 5:35

- Recorded in New York City in Autumn 1970.

== Personnel ==
- Jimmy McGriff - organ
- Unknown - tenor saxophone
- Unknown - guitar
- Unknown - drums
