= Ms. Jazz =

Studio album by Carmen McRae
- Released: 1974
- Recorded: March 1973
- Studio: New York, NY
- Genre: Jazz
- Length: 30:15
- Label: Groove Merchant; GM 531
- Producer: Sonny Lester

Carmen McRae chronology
It Takes a Whole Lot of Human Feeling (1973)	Ms. Jazz (1974)	November Girl (1975)

Ms. Jazz is an album by American jazz vocalist Carmen McRae recorded in 1973 and released on the Groove Merchant label the following year.

Professional ratings
Review scores
Source	Rating
Allmusic	3/5 stars

== Track listing ==
1. "You Are the Sunshine of My Life" (Stevie Wonder) – 3:10
2. "You and I" (Wonder) – 4:47
3. "You're Mine, You" (Johnny Green, Edward Heyman) – 3:10
4. "Exactly Like You" (Jimmy McHugh, Dorothy Fields) – 3:37
5. "This Masquerade" (Leon Russell) – 3:47
6. "The Good Life" (Sacha Distel, Jack Reardon) – 2:51
7. "How Could I Settle for Less" (Distel, Jean Broussolle, Robert I. Allen) – 2:34
8. "There'll Come a Time" (Shelton Brooks) – 4:17
9. "Livin'" (Tom Garvin) – 4:29
10. "Hey John" (Blossom Dearie, Jim Council) – 3:20

== Personnel ==
- Carmen McRae − vocals
- Zoot Sims – tenor saxophone
- Bucky Pizzarelli − guitar
- Tom Garvin − piano
- Paul West − bass
- Jimmy Madison − drums
