= Giants of the Organ Come Together =

Studio album by Jimmy McGriff and Groove Holmes
- Released: May 1973
- Recorded: 1973
- Studio: New York City
- Genre: Jazz
- Length: 41:05
- Label: Groove Merchant; GM 520
- Producer: Sonny Lester

Jimmy McGriff chronology
Concert: Friday the 13th - Cook County Jail (1973)	Giants of the Organ Come Together (1973)	Giants of the Organ in Concert (1973)

Groove Holmes chronology
Night Glider (1973)	Giants of the Organ Come Together (1973)	Giants of the Organ in Concert (1973)

Giants of the Organ Come Together is an album by American jazz organists Jimmy McGriff and Groove Holmes recorded in 1973 and released on the Groove Merchant label.

Professional ratings
Review scores
Source	Rating
Allmusic	3/5 stars

== Track listing ==
All compositions by Jimmy McGriff and Groove Holmes except where noted

1. "Licks A'Plenty" (Eddie Davis) – 6:59
2. "Out of Nowhere" (Howard Scott, Morris Dickerson, Harold Brown, Charles Miller, Lonnie Jordan, Thomas Allen) – 8:33
3. "The Squirrel" – 5:24
4. "Finger Lickin' Good" – 6:18
5. "How High the Moon" (Morgan Lewis, Nancy Hamilton) – 7:03
6. "Things Ain't What They Used to Be" (Mercer Ellington, Ted Persons) – 6:48

== Personnel ==
- Groove Holmes, Jimmy McGriff – organ
- George Freeman, O'Donel Levy – guitar
- Bernard Purdie – drums
- Kwasi Jayourba – congas
