= Big Band Machine =

Studio album by Buddy Rich
- Released: 1975
- Genre: Jazz
- Length: 36:00
- Label: Groove Merchant
- Producer: Sonny Lester

Buddy Rich chronology
The Last Blues Album, Vol. 1 (1974)	Big Band Machine (1975)	Speak No Evil (1976)

Alternative cover
- 1996 Simitar CD re-issue

Big Band Machine is a jazz album recorded by Buddy Rich and his big band, released on the Groove Merchant Record label in 1975.

== Track listing ==
LP side A:

1. "Three Day Sucker" (Lofgreen) – 6:50
2. "Tommy Medley" (Townshend) – 12:26
  1. "Eyesight to the Blind"
  2. "Champagne"
  3. "See Me, Feel Me"
  4. "Miracle Cure"
  5. "Listening to You"

LP side B:

1. "On Broadway" (Mann, Weil, Leiber, Stoller) – 3:48
2. "Pieces of Dreams" (Legrand) – 4:30
3. "Ease On down the Road" (Smalls) – 3:30
4. "West Side Story [medley] '75" (Bernstein, Sondheim) – 5:27

bonus tracks added to 2003 CD re-issue (P-Vine, Japan):

7. "Nik Nik" – 2:52
8. "Layin' it Down" – 2:50

bonus tracks added to 2005 CD re-issue (LRC Records):

7. "Playhouse" (Albam) – 6:26
8. "Lush Life" (Loose) – 4:09
- "Three Day Sucker" arranged by Lofgreen
- "Tommy" Medley arranged by Michael Longo
- "On Broadway" arranged by Dave Marowitz
- "Pieces of Dream" arranged by Richard Lieb
- "Ease on Down the Road" arranged by David Berger
- "West Side Story" Medley arranged by Bill Reddie

== Reception ==
The Allmusic awarded the album 3 stars.

Professional ratings
Review scores
Source	Rating
Allmusic	3/5 stars

== Personnel ==
- William "Bill" Blount – alto saxophone player cited incorrectly in liner notes as Bill "Blaut"
- Peter Yellin – alto saxophone
- Steve Marcus – tenor saxophone, soprano saxophone
- Bob Mintzer – tenor saxophone
- Roger Rosenberg – baritone saxophone
- Lloyd Michels – trumpet
- Charles Camilleri – trumpet
- Danny Hayes – trumpet
- Richard Hurwitz – trumpet
- Ross Konikoff – trumpet
- Barry Maur – trombone
- Gerald Chamberlain – trombone
- Anthony Salvatori – bass trombone
- Cliff Morris – guitar
- Cornell Dupree – guitar
- Wayne Wright – guitar
- Greg Kogan – piano
- Ben Brown – bass
- Buddy Rich – drums
- Ray Armondo – congas
