= Transition (Buddy Rich Lionel Hampton album) =

Studio album by Buddy Rich / Lionel Hampton
- Released: 1974
- Recorded: 1974
- Genre: Jazz
- Length: 37:07
- Label: Groove Merchant
- Producer: Sonny Lester

Buddy Rich chronology
Very Live at Buddy's Place (1974)	Transition (1974)	The Last Blues Album, Vol. 1 (1974)

Lionel Hampton chronology
Stop, I Don't Need No Sympathy (1974)	Transition (1974)	The Works (1975)

Professional ratings
Review scores
Source	Rating
Allmusic	3/5 stars

Transition is a jazz album recorded by Buddy Rich and Lionel Hampton and released on the Groove Merchant Record label in 1974.

== Track listing ==
LP side A

1. "Avalon" (Al Jolson, Billy Rose) – 3:31
2. "Airmail Special" (Benny Goodman, Jimmy Mundy, Charlie Christian) – 6:07
3. "Ham Hock Blues" (Lionel Hampton) – 5:34
4. "Ring dem Bells" (Duke Ellington, Irving Mills) – 4:15

LP side B

1. "E.G." (Mike Abene) – 8:24
2. "Fum" – (Jack Wilkens [sic]) 9:20

== Personnel ==
- Buddy Rich – drums
- Lionel Hampton – vibraphone
- Teddy Wilson – piano (except "E.G." and "Fum")
- Zoot Sims – tenor saxophone (except "E.G.")
- George Duvivier – bass (except "E.G." and "Fum")
- Sal Nistico – tenor saxophone – (on "E.G." and "Fum")
- Jack Wilkins – guitar (on "E.G." and "Fum")
- Kenny Barron – piano (on "E.G." and "Fum")
- Joe Romano – soprano saxophone (on "E.G." and "Fum")
- Anthony Jackson – bass (on "E.G." and "Fum")
- Bob Cranshaw – bass (on "E.G." and "Fum")
- Stanley Kay – percussion (on "E.G." and "Fum")
- Ted Sommer – percussion (on "E.G." and "Fum")
