= The Worm (Jimmy McGriff album) =

Studio album by Jimmy McGriff Organ and Blues Band
- Released: 1968
- Recorded: August 19–22, 1968 in New York City
- Genre: Soul jazz, jazz-funk
- Length: 37:53
- Label: Solid State SS-18045
- Producer: Sonny Lester

Jimmy McGriff chronology
Honey (1968)	The Worm (1968)	Step 1 (1968)

The Worm is an album by American jazz organist Jimmy McGriff featuring performances recorded in 1968 and originally released on the Solid State label.

== Reception ==
The Allmusic review by Thom Jurek stated "The Worm is a monster album through and through. Not only is it a revelatory example of McGriff on the wild, it marks one of the first places where the new funky urban soul met jazz and blues and evolved into jazz-funk".

Professional ratings
Review scores
Source	Rating
Allmusic	4/5 stars
The Penguin Guide to Jazz Recordings	3/4 stars

== Track listing ==
All compositions by Jimmy McGriff except as indicated

1. "The Worm" (Sonny Lester, Jimmy McGriff, Fats Theus) - 3:20
2. "Keep Loose" - 5:56
3. "Heavyweight" - 6:52
4. "Think" (Aretha Franklin, Ted White) - 3:16
5. "Lock It Up" (Kenny Burrell) - 5:13
6. "Girl Talk" (Neal Hefti, Bobby Troup) - 4:31
7. "Blue Juice" - 4:59
8. "Take the "A" Train" (Billy Strayhorn) - 3:46

== Personnel ==
- Jimmy McGriff - organ
- Blue Mitchell - trumpet
- Danny Turner - alto saxophone
- Fats Theus - tenor saxophone
- Robert Ashton - baritone saxophone
- Thornel Schwartz - guitar
- Bob Bushnell - electric bass
- Mel Lewis, Grady Tate - drums
