= The Way You Look Tonight (album) =

Studio album by Jimmy McGriff
- Released: 1970
- Recorded: 1969
- Studio: New York City
- Genre: Jazz
- Length: 30:22
- Label: Solid State; SS 18063
- Producer: Sonny Lester

Jimmy McGriff chronology
A Thing to Come By (1969)	The Way You Look Tonight (1970)	Electric Funk (1970)

The Way You Look Tonight (also released as I Want to Talk About You) is an album by American jazz organist Jimmy McGriff recorded in 1969 and released on the Solid State label the following year.

== Track listing ==
1. "The Way You Look Tonight" (Jerome Kern, Dorothy Fields) – 5:27
2. "Moon River" (Henry Mancini, Johnny Mercer) – 4:33
3. "I Want to Talk About You" (Billy Eckstine) – 5:51
4. "Once Again" (Jimmy McGriff) – 5:17
5. "Laura" (David Raksin) – 5:33
6. "All Soul" (C. Lewis) – 3:41

== Personnel ==
- Jimmy McGriff − organ
- Unidentified musicians − guitar, drums
