= The Cisco Kid (album) =

Studio album by Reuben Wilson
- Released: 1973
- Recorded: 1973
- Studio: New York, NY
- Genre: Jazz
- Length: 37:27
- Label: Groove Merchant; GM 523
- Producer: Sonny Lester

Reuben Wilson chronology
| The Sweet Life (1972) | The Cisco Kid (1973) | Got to Get Your Own (1975) |

The Cisco Kid is an album by American jazz organist Reuben Wilson recorded in 1973 and released on the Groove Merchant label.

== Reception ==
Professional ratings
Review scores
| Source | Rating |
|---|---|
| Allmusic | 3/5 stars |

Allmusic's Jason Ankeny said: "Reuben Wilson's second Groove Merchant session, The Cisco Kid, pairs the organist with a murderer's-row support unit ... Given the talent involved, it's regrettable that the album adheres to such a pedestrian formula, reimagining the same pop and soul covers as virtually every other jazz-funk session issued at the time".

== Track listing ==
All compositions by Reuben Wilson except where noted.

1. "The Cisco Kid" (Thomas Allen, B.B. Dickerson, Harold Brown, Charles Miller, Lonnie Jordan, Lee Oskar, Howard Scott) – 5:19
2. "Last Tango in Paris" (Gato Barbieri) – 3:55
3. "Superfly" (Curtis Mayfield) – 4:53
4. "We've Only Just Begun" (Roger Nichols, Paul Williams) – 4:03
5. "Snaps" – 7:17
6. "Groove Grease" – 6:45
7. "The Look of Love" (Burt Bacharach, Hal David) – 5:15

== Personnel ==
- Reuben Wilson – organ
- Garnett Brown − trombone
- Melvin Sparks − guitar
- Bob Cranshaw – bass
- Mickey Roker − drums
- Ray Amando − congas
