= Honey (Jimmy McGriff album) =

Studio album by Jimmy McGriff Organ & Big Blues Band
- Released: 1968
- Recorded: 1968 in New York City
- Genre: Jazz
- Label: Solid State SS-18036
- Producer: Sonny Lester

Jimmy McGriff chronology
I've Got a New Woman (1967)	Honey (1968)	The Worm (1968)

Honey is an album by American jazz organist Jimmy McGriff featuring McGriff's performances of contemporary soul music hits recorded in 1968 and first released on the Solid State label.

== Reception ==
AllMusic gave the album 3 stars.

Professional ratings
Review scores
Source	Rating
AllMusic	3/5 stars

== Track listing ==
1. "(Sweet Sweet Baby) Since You've Been Gone" (Aretha Franklin, Teddy White) - 2:22
2. "Respect" (Otis Redding) - 2:03
3. "Chain of Fools" (Don Covay) - 3:37
4. "We're a Winner" (Curtis Mayfield) - 2:06
5. "Up, Up and Away" (Jimmy Webb) - 2:45
6. "Tell Mama" (Clarence Carter) - 2:15
7. "Honey" (Bobby Russell) - 2:30
8. "I Thank You" (David Porter, Isaac Hayes) - 2:04
9. "I Got the Feelin'" (James Brown) - 2:10
10. "Baby, I Love You" (Jeff Barry, Ellie Greenwich, Phil Spector) - 2:46
11. "(Sittin' On) The Dock of the Bay" (Steve Cropper, Otis Redding) - 2:09

== Personnel ==
- Jimmy McGriff - organ
- Uncredited musicians - trumpet, trombone, alto saxophone, tenor saxophone, baritone saxophone, guitar, electric bass, drums
