= Electric Funk =

Studio album by Jimmy McGriff
- Released: August 1970
- Recorded: September 1969
- Studio: New York City
- Genre: Soul jazz
- Length: 32:13
- Label: Blue Note BST-84350
- Producer: Sonny Lester

Jimmy McGriff chronology
The Way You Look Tonight (1970)	Electric Funk (1970)	The Dudes Doin' Business (1970)

Electric Funk is an album by the American jazz organist Jimmy McGriff of performances recorded in 1969 and released on the Blue Note label.

== Reception ==
Professional ratings
Review scores
Source	Rating
Allmusic	3/5 stars
The Penguin Guide to Jazz Recordings	2/4 stars

The Allmusic review by Stephen Thomas Erlewine awarded the album 3 out of 5 stars and said, "It's not jazz, it's jazzy soul, and it's among the funkiest of any soul-jazz records from the late '60s, filled with stuttering drum breaks, lite [sic] fuzz guitars, elastic bass, smoldering organ, and punchy, slightly incongruous horn charts." On All About Jazz Douglas Payne stated "No sap, no frills. Just good true groove. ... in 1969, this was the next step for soul jazz; a genre Jimmy McGriff has always ruled. ... this man has always known how to rock a groove ... Ott's arrangements are riff-oriented and stay out of McGriff's way. They often launch McGriff into one clever line after another and, fortunately, never tempt him to out-modulate the horn section".

== Track listing ==
All compositions by Jimmy McGriff except where noted

1. "Back on the Track" (Horace Ott) – 3:18
2. "Chris Cross" (Ott) – 3:46
3. "Miss Poopie" (Ott) – 3:18
4. "The Bird Wave" – 4:01
5. "Spear for Moondog Part 1" – 3:29
6. "Spear for Moondog Part 2" – 3:04
7. "Tight Times" (Ott) – 3:58
8. "Spinning Wheel" (David Clayton-Thomas) – 3:34
9. "Funky Junk" (Ott) – 3:45

== Personnel ==
- Jimmy McGriff – electronic organ
- Blue Mitchell – trumpet
- Stanley Turrentine – tenor saxophone
- Horace Ott – electric piano, arranger
- Unknown – guitar
- Chuck Rainey – electric bass
- Bernard Purdie – drums
