= Black Pearl (Jimmy McGriff album) =

Live album by Jimmy McGriff
- Released: 1971
- Recorded: 1971
- Genre: Jazz
- Label: Blue Note
- Producer: Sonny Lester

Jimmy McGriff chronology
Something to Listen To (1970)	Black Pearl (1971)	Jimmy McGriff with Junior Parker (1971)

Black Pearl is a live album by American jazz organist Jimmy McGriff featuring performances recorded in New Jersey in 1971 and released on the Blue Note label.

== Track listing ==
All compositions by Jimmy McGriff except as indicated

1. "Black Pearl" (Pierre Daniel, Sonny Lester)
2. "In a Mellow Tone" (Duke Ellington)
3. "Man from Bad"
4. "Ode to Billie Joe" (Bobbie Gentry)
5. "Groove Alley"
6. "C Jam Blues" (Barney Bigard, Duke Ellington)
  - Recorded live at The Golden Slipper in Newark, New Jersey in early 1971.

== Personnel ==
- Jimmy McGriff - organ
- Ronald White - trumpet
- Joseph Morris - alto saxophone
- Arthur "Fats" Theus - tenor saxophone
- William Thorpe - baritone saxophone
- O'Donel "Butch" Levy - guitar
- Willie "Saint" Jenkins - drums
