= Very Live at Buddy's Place =

Live album by Buddy Rich
- Released: 1974
- Recorded: May 9 & 23, 1974
- Venue: Buddy's Place
- Genre: Jazz
- Length: 41:02
- Label: Groove Merchant
- Producer: Sonny Lester

Buddy Rich chronology
The Roar of '74 (1974)	Very Live at Buddy's Place (1974)	Transition (1974)

Professional ratings
Review scores
Source	Rating
Allmusic	4/5 stars

Very Live at Buddy's Place is a jazz septet album by drummer Buddy Rich recorded in 1974 and released on the Groove Merchant Records label.

== Track listing ==
LP side A

1. "Chameleon" (Herbie Hancock) – 4:52
2. "Jumpin' at the Woodside" (Count Basie, Jon Hendricks) – 7:20
3. "Sierra Lonely" (Manny Albam) – 6:21

LP side B

1. "Cardin Blue" (Rich) – 9:51
2. "Nica's Dream" (Horace Silver) – 6:38
3. "Billie's Bounce" (Charlie Parker) – 6:00

== Personnel ==
- Buddy Rich – drum set
- Anthony Jackson – bass
- Kenny Barron – piano
- Michael Abene – piano & arranger ("Jumpin' at the Woodside")
- Jack Wilkins – guitar
- Jimmy Maelen – conga
- Sonny Fortune – alto saxophone, flute
- Sal Nistico – tenor saxophone
