= Step 1 (album) =

Studio album by Jimmy McGriff Organ and Blues Band
- Released: 1969
- Recorded: December 17 & 19, 1968
- Studio: New York City
- Genre: Jazz
- Length: 29:56
- Label: Solid State SS 18053
- Producer: Sonny Lester

Jimmy McGriff chronology
| The Worm (1968) | Step 1 (1969) | A Thing to Come By (1969) |

Step 1 is an album by American jazz organist Jimmy McGriff recorded in late 1968 and first released on the Solid State label the following year.

== Track listing ==
All compositions by Jimmy McGriff except where noted

1. "Step One" − 3:34
2. "South Wes" (Larry Frazier) − 3:36
3. "Easter Parade" (Irving Berlin) − 2:54
4. "Jimmy's Blues" − 8:10
5. "For Once in My Life" (Ron Miller, Orlando Murden) − 4:52
6. "Motoring Along" − 3:50

== Personnel ==
- Jimmy McGriff – organ
- Blue Mitchell − trumpet
- Danny Turner − alto saxophone
- Arthur 'Fats' Theus − electric tenor saxophone
- Bob Ashton − baritone saxophone
- Larry Frazier − guitar
- Jesse Kilpatrick Jr. − drums
- Unidentified Female vocalists − background vocals (tracks 1 and 2)
