= The Last Blues Album Volume 1 =

Studio album by Buddy Rich
- Released: 1974
- Genre: Jazz
- Length: 35:22
- Label: Groove Merchant
- Producer: Sonny Lester

Buddy Rich chronology
| Transition (1974) | The Last Blues Album Volume 1 (1974) | Big Band Machine (1975) |

Professional ratings
Review scores
| Source | Rating |
|---|---|
| Allmusic | 3/5 stars |

The Last Blues Album Volume 1 is a jazz album recorded by Buddy Rich and released on the Groove Merchant Record label in 1974.

== Track listing ==
LP side A:

1. "Soft Winds" – 7:17
2. "Sweet Georgia Brown" – 6:32
3. "How Long" – 4:53

LP side B:

1. "Courage" – 9:20
2. "Alright" – 7:20

== Personnel ==
- Buddy Rich – drums
- Bob Cranshaw – bass
- Kenny Barron – piano
- George Freeman – guitar
- Illinois Jacquet – tenor saxophone
- Jimmy McGriff – organ
