= Goodbye Yesterday =

Studio album by Lucky Thompson
- Released: 1973
- Recorded: 1972
- Studio: New York City
- Genre: Jazz
- Length: 32:50
- Label: Groove Merchant; GM 508
- Producer: Sonny Lester

Lucky Thompson chronology
Soul's Nite Out (1971)	Goodbye Yesterday (1973)	Concert: Friday the 13th - Cook County Jail (1973)

Goodbye Yesterday is an album featuring performances by jazz saxophonist Lucky Thompson which was released on the Groove Merchant label.

== Reception ==
Professional ratings
Review scores
Source	Rating
Allmusic	3/5 stars

Allmusic's Scott Yanow said: "During what would be the final part of his active career, Lucky Thompson recorded 2½ records for Groove Merchant during 1972-73. On his debut for the label, Thompson switches between tenor and soprano ... Thompson contributed all seven compositions (none of which are all that memorable) and, although he plays well enough (he never declined on records), this out-of-print LP is one of his lesser efforts".

== Track listing ==
All compositions by Lucky Thompson

1. "Home Come'n" − 3:34
2. "Tea Time" − 5:30
3. "Lazy Day" − 4:28
4. "Soul Lullaby" − 4:30
5. "Then Soul Walked In" − 5:03
6. "Fillet of Soul" − 6:25
7. "Back to the World" − 3:20

== Personnel ==
- Lucky Thompson – tenor saxophone, soprano saxophone
- Cedar Walton – electric piano, piano, celesta
- Larry Ridley – bass
- Billy Higgins – drums
