= Madame Foo-Foo =

Studio album by Dakota Staton
- Released: 1972
- Recorded: 1972
- Studio: New York City
- Genre: Jazz
- Length: 36:36
- Label: Groove Merchant; GM 510
- Producer: Sonny Lester

Dakota Staton chronology
I've Been There (1970)	Madame Foo-Foo (1972)	I Want a Country Man (1973)

Madame Foo-Foo is an album by American jazz vocalist Dakota Staton recorded in 1972 and released on the Groove Merchant label.

== Reception ==
Professional ratings
Review scores
Source	Rating
Allmusic	4/5 stars

Allmusic's Jason Ankeny said: "Recorded with soul-jazz icon Richard "Groove" Holmes on Hammond, Madame Foo Foo not only boasts a hip, contemporary sound unlike any of Staton's previous efforts, but it's an approach that fits the singer like a glove, accentuating the earthy, blues-inspired elements so vital to her craft. ... the session settles into a sinuous, late-night groove that complements the far-ranging material in full. Silent for so long, Staton clearly savors every nuance and turn of phrase, delivering one of her finest and most impassioned performances".

== Track listing ==
1. "Let It Be Me" (Gilbert Bécaud, Pierre Delanoë, Manny Curtis) – 4:17
2. "Congratulations to Someone" (Roy Alfred, Al Frisch) – 4:43
3. "Let Me Off Uptown" (Earl Bostic, Redd Evans) – 2:43
4. "A House Is Not a Home" (Burt Bacharach, Hal David) – 3:33
5. "Blues for Tasty" (Dakota Staton) – 4:08
6. "A Losing Battle" (Mac Rebennack, Leonard Dauenhauer) – 3:30
7. "Deep in a Dream" (Jimmy Van Heusen, Eddie DeLange) – 2:28
8. "Confessin' the Blues" (Jay McShann, Walter Brown) – 3:59
9. "Candy" (Alex Kramer, Mack David, Joan Whitney) – 3:15
10. "Moonglow" (Will Hudson, Irving Mills, DeLange) – 3:20

== Personnel ==
- Dakota Staton − vocals
- Groove Holmes – organ
- Horace Ott – electric piano
- Cornell Dupree (tracks 1–3, 5–8), Lloyd Davis (tracks 4, 9 & 10) – guitar
- Paul Martinez – bass
- Bernard Purdie – drums
- Kwasi Jayourba – congas, bongos
