= Night Glider =

Studio album by Groove Holmes
- Released: 1973
- Recorded: 1973
- Studio: Bell Sound (New York City)
- Genre: Jazz
- Length: 33:12
- Label: Groove Merchant; GM 512
- Producer: Sonny Lester

Groove Holmes chronology
American Pie (1972)	Night Glider (1973)	Giants of the Organ Come Together (1973)

Night Glider is an album by the American jazz organist Groove Holmes recorded at New York City's Bell Sound Studios in 1973 and released on the Groove Merchant label.

== Reception ==
Professional ratings
Review scores
Source	Rating
Allmusic	3/5 stars

Allmusic's Matt Collar wrote, "Night Glider is a solid early-'70s funk-jazz set."

== Track listing ==
1. "Night Glider" (Horace Ott) – 5:20
2. "Fly Jack" (Ott) – 3:34
3. "It's Going to Take Some Time" (Carole King, Toni Stern) – 4:30
4. "Pure Sugar Cane" (Richard "Groove" Holmes) – 4:59
5. "Go Away Little Girl" (Gerry Goffin, King) – 5:32
6. "One Mint Julep" (Rudy Toombs) – 4:55
7. "Young and Foolish" (Albert Hague, Arnold B. Horwitt) – 4:22

== Personnel ==
- Groove Holmes – organ
- Garnett Brown − trombone
- Seldon Powell − tenor saxophone
- Horace Ott − electric piano
- Lloyd Davis − guitar
- Paul Martinez – bass guitar
- Bernard Purdie − drums
- Kwasi Jayourba – congas, bongos
