= Giants of the Organ in Concert =

Live album by Jimmy McGriff and Groove Holmes
- Released: 1973
- Recorded: 1973
- Venue: Paul's Mall, Boston, MA
- Genre: Jazz
- Length: 78:38
- Label: Groove Merchant; GM 3300
- Producer: Sonny Lester

Jimmy McGriff chronology
Giants of the Organ Come Together (1973)	Giants of the Organ in Concert (1973)	The Main Squeeze (1974)

Groove Holmes chronology
Giants of the Organ Come Together (1973)	Giants of the Organ in Concert (1973)	New Groove (1974)

Giants of the Organ in Concert is a live album by American jazz organists Jimmy McGriff and Groove Holmes recorded in Boston in 1973 and originally released on the Groove Merchant label as a double LP.

Professional ratings
Review scores
Source	Rating
Allmusic	4.5/5 stars

== Track listing ==
All compositions by Jimmy McGriff and Groove Holmes

1. "The Preacher's Tune" – 11:05
2. "Bean's" – 6:47
3. "Mozambique" – 15:52
4. "Closing Theme" – 2:32
5. "Brown Bread" – 9:45
6. "Talk to Me" – 10:52
7. "Boston Whaler" – 12:52
8. "Chopper" – 8:53

== Personnel ==
- Groove Holmes, Jimmy McGriff – organ
- Leon Cook, Mark Elf, O'Donel Levy – guitar
- Mike Moss – drums
- Kwasi Jayourba – percussion
