= I Want a Country Man =

Studio album by Dakota Staton
- Released: 1973
- Recorded: February 20 & 26, 1973
- Studio: New York City
- Genre: Jazz
- Length: 35:30
- Label: Groove Merchant; GM 521
- Producer: Sonny Lester

Dakota Staton chronology
Madame Foo-Foo (1972)	I Want a Country Man (1973)	Ms. Soul (1974)

I Want a Country Man is an album by American jazz vocalist Dakota Staton recorded in 1973 and released on the Groove Merchant label.

== Reception ==
Professional ratings
Review scores
Source	Rating
Allmusic	4/5 stars

Allmusic's Jason Ankeny said: "Dakota Staton's second Groove Merchant session refines the hip contemporary sound first introduced via the preceding Madame Foo Foo. Paired with arranger Manny Albam, she veers further away from conventional jazz sensibilities into soul, a move that perfectly complements her impassioned approach. Its earthy title notwithstanding, I Want a Country Man boasts an urbane stylishness that underscores the late-night ambience of the set. Albam's lovely arrangements serve both Staton and the material, adding depth and energy".

== Track listing ==
1. "Country Man" (Dakota Staton) – 3:57
2. "I Love You More Than You'll Ever Know" (Al Kooper) – 6:17
3. "Girl Talk" (Neal Hefti, Bobby Troup) – 3:23
4. "Cry Me a River" (Arthur Hamilton) – 4:01
5. "Heartbreak" (Joe Thomas) – 4:20
6. "It's the Talk of the Town" (Jerry Livingston, Al J. Neiburg, Marty Symes) – 4:55
7. "Make It Easy on Yourself" (Burt Bacharach, Hal David) – 4:22
8. "How Did He Look?" (Abner Silver, Gladys Shelley) – 4:15

== Personnel ==
- Dakota Staton − vocals
- Cecil Bridgewater, Marvin Stamm, Burt Collins, Joe Newman (tracks 4 & 6–8), Lew Soloff (tracks 1–3 & 5) − trumpet
- Eddie Bert, Bill Watrous, Garnett Brown − trombone
- Jerry Dodgion − soprano saxophone
- Joe Firrantello − alto saxophone
- Frank Wess (tracks 1–3 & 5), Eddie Daniels (tracks 4 & 6–8) − tenor saxophone
- Pepper Adams − baritone saxophone
- Unidentified rhythm section
- Manny Albam − arranger, conductor
