= Ms. Soul =

Studio album by Dakota Staton
- Released: 1974
- Recorded: 1974
- Studio: New York City
- Genre: Jazz
- Length: 36:28
- Label: Groove Merchant; GM 532
- Producer: Sonny Lester

Dakota Staton chronology
I Want a Country Man (1973)	Ms. Soul (1974)	Uniquely Dakota (1983)

Ms. Soul is an album by American jazz vocalist Dakota Staton recorded in 1974 and released on the Groove Merchant label.

Professional ratings
Review scores
Source	Rating
Allmusic	3/5 stars

== Track listing ==
All compositions by Dakota Staton except where noted.

1. "Play Your Hands, Girls" – 3:33
2. "I'd Go Back Home" – 4:14
3. "Porgy" (Jimmy McHugh, Dorothy Fields) – 3:14
4. "Hurry Home" – 2:36
5. "Little Man (You've Had a Busy Day)" (Al Hoffman, Maurice Sigler, Mabel Wayne) – 3:12
6. "Between 18th and 19th on Chestnut Street" (Will Osborne, Dick Rogers) – 3:19
7. "Why Don't You Think Things Over" (Lillian Friedlander, Honey Friedlander) – 3:32
8. "A Nightingale Sang in Berkeley Square" (Manning Sherwin, Eric Maschwitz) – 3:00
9. "He Will Call Again" (Gladys Shelley) – 4:24
10. "Save This Love Affair" – 5:24

== Personnel ==
- Dakota Staton − vocals
- Peter Loeb – tenor saxophone, soprano saxophone
- Norman Simmons – piano
- Bob Cunningham – bass
- Qasim Bobby Hamilton – drums
