= Stump Juice =

Studio album by Jimmy McGriff
- Released: 1975
- Recorded: 1975
- Studio: New York City, NY
- Genre: Jazz
- Length: 34:54
- Label: Groove Merchant; GM 3309
- Producer: Sonny Lester

Jimmy McGriff chronology
The Main Squeeze (1974)	Stump Juice (1975)	The Mean Machine (1976)

Stump Juice is an album by American jazz organist Jimmy McGriff recorded in 1975 and released on the Groove Merchant label.

== Reception ==
Professional ratings
Review scores
Source	Rating
Allmusic	4/5 stars

Allmusic's Jason Ankeny said: "'Unlike the majority of Groove Merchant dates from the mid-'70s, Stump Juice forgoes warhorse pop and soul covers in favor of original tunes – these tabulas rasa are the ideal canvas for Lester's bare-essentials production and McGriff's sinuous grooves, eschewing fusion and disco influences in favor of raw, unadulterated jazz-funk".

== Track listing ==
All compositions by Jimmy McGriff except where noted

1. "Purple Onion" (Leo Johnson) – 5:46
2. "The Little One" (Johnson) – 4:04
3. "Stump Juice" (Jesse Morrison) – 3:37
4. "Cumayon" (Johnson) – 3:30
5. "T.N.T." – 5:51
6. "Stretch Me Out" – 6:28
7. "Pisces" (Jimmy Ponder) – 5:38

== Personnel ==
- Jimmy McGriff – organ, keyboards
- Ernest Jones – synthesizer
- Leo Johnson, Jesse Morrison, Joe Thomas – tenor saxophone
- Jimmy Ponder – lead guitar
- Ralph Byrd – rhythm guitar
- Bob Cranshaw, Andrew McCloud – bass
- Lawrence Killian – percussion
- Unidentified musicians – trumpet, flute, drums
