= Concert: Friday the 13th – Cook County Jail =

1973 live album by Jimmy McGriff

Live album by Jimmy McGriff with George Freeman + O'Donel Levy/Lucky Thompson
- Released: 1973
- Recorded: October 13, 1972
- Venue: Cook County Jail, Chicago, ILL
- Genre: Jazz
- Length: 40:44
- Label: Groove Merchant; GM 515
- Producer: Sonny Lester

Jimmy McGriff chronology
Fly Dude (1972)	Concert: Friday the 13th – Cook County Jail (1973)	Giants of the Organ Come Together (1973)

Lucky Thompson chronology
Goodbye Yesterday (1973)	Concert: Friday the 13th – Cook County Jail (1973)	I Offer You (1973)

Concert: Friday the 13th – Cook County Jail is a live split album recorded at Cook County Jail in October 1972 featuring performances by jazz organist Jimmy McGriff's Quintet with guitarists George Freeman and O'Donel Levy, and saxophonist Lucky Thompson's Quartet which was released on the Groove Merchant label.

== Reception ==
Professional ratings
Review scores
Source	Rating
Allmusic	4/5 stars

Allmusic's Scott Yanow said: "This album contains two separate sets that were both performed before inmates at the Cook County Jail one day in 1972. Organist Jimmy McGriff and his quintet performs his lengthy two-part "Freedom Suite," generating a great deal of heat. Lucky Thompson, mostly on soprano, jams on three standards ... Thompson's hot playing (particularly on "Cherokee") makes this album worth searching for".

== Track listing ==
All compositions by Jimmy McGriff except where noted

1. "Freedom Suite (Part 1) – 8:58
2. "Freedom Suite (Part 2) – 15:45
3. "Green Dolphin Street" (Bronisław Kaper, Ned Washington) – 5:51
4. "Everything Happens to Me" (Matt Dennis, Tom Adair) – 5:41
5. "Cherokee" (Ray Noble) – 4:29

== Personnel ==
Tracks 1 & 2:

- Jimmy McGriff – organ
- George Freeman, O'Donel Levy – guitar
- Mickey Bass – bass
- Marion J. Booker – drums

Tracks 3–5:

- Lucky Thompson – tenor saxophone, soprano saxophone
- Cedar Walton – electric piano
- Sam Jones – bass
- Louis Hayes – drums
