= New Groove (Groove Holmes album) =

Studio album by Groove Holmes
- Released: 1974
- Recorded: 1974
- Studio: New York, NY
- Genre: Jazz
- Length: 35:08
- Label: Groove Merchant; GM 527
- Producer: Sonny Lester

Groove Holmes chronology
Giants of the Organ in Concert (1973)	New Groove (1974)	Onsaya Joy (1975)

New Groove is an album by American jazz organist Groove Holmes recorded in 1974 and released on the Groove Merchant label.

== Reception ==
Professional ratings
Review scores
Source	Rating
Allmusic	3/5 stars

Allmusic's Matt Collar said: "New Groove is an enjoyable if minor early-'70s soul-jazz outing from organist Richard 'Groove' Holmes. Featuring a mix of originals, standards, and pop tunes, the album revolves around Holmes' funky organ chops."

== Track listing ==
All compositions by Richard "Groove" Holmes except where noted.

1. "Red Onion" (Manny Albam, Richard "Groove" Holmes) – 3:44
2. "No Trouble on the Mountain" (Leon Cook) – 3:57
3. "Meditation" (Antônio Carlos Jobim, Newton Mendonça, Norman Gimbel) – 6:11
4. "Good Vibrations" – 4:40
5. "You've Got It Bad" (Stevie Wonder, Yvonne Wright) – 5:22
6. "Chu-Chu" – 5:36
7. "How Insensitive" (Jobim, Vinícius de Moraes, Gimbel) – 5:43

== Personnel ==
- Groove Holmes – organ
- Burt Collins, Jon Faddis, Ernie Royal, Marvin Stamm − trumpet
- Eddie Daniels − flute, tenor saxophone, piccolo
- Leon Cook, O'Donel Levy − guitar
- Bernard Purdie − drums
- Kwasi Jayourba – percussion
- Manny Albam − arranger
