= Let's Stay Together (Jimmy McGriff album) =

Studio album by Jimmy McGriff
- Released: 1972
- Recorded: 1966 and January 1972
- Studio: New York City
- Genre: Jazz
- Length: 32:27
- Label: Groove Merchant; GM 506
- Producer: Sonny Lester

Jimmy McGriff chronology
Groove Grease (1971)	Let's Stay Together (1972)	Fly Dude (1972)

Let's Stay Together is an album by American jazz organist Jimmy McGriff featuring performances recorded in 1966 and 1972 and released on the Groove Merchant label.

== Reception ==
Professional ratings
Review scores
Source	Rating
Allmusic	3/5 stars

Allmusic's Stephen Cook said: "Let's Stay Together is a great set by one of the masters of the Hammond B-3 organ sound". On All About Jazz Douglas Payne noted "The music, unfortunately, isn't terribly memorable. But the R&B covers benefit by McGriff's outstanding blues touch and the funky "Tiki" and the glorious blues of "Old Grand Dad" (the only originals) are what make a McGriff album worth every dollar. Although nothing too surprising happens here, McGriff fans will want to pick up on this cut-out classic"

== Track listing ==
1. "Let's Stay Together" (Al Green, Willie Mitchell, Al Jackson Jr.) – 2:45
2. "Tiki" (Jimmy McGriff) – 4:20
3. "Theme from Shaft" (Isaac Hayes) – 4:00
4. "What's Going On" (Marvin Gaye, Renaldo Benson, Al Cleveland) – 4:33
5. "Old Grand Dad" (McGriff, Thornel Schwartz) – 5:04
6. "Georgia on My Mind" (Hoagy Carmichael, Stuart Gorrell) – 6:42
7. "April in Paris" (Vernon Duke, Yip Harburg) – 5:03

== Personnel ==
- Jimmy McGriff – organ
- William Skinner – trumpet (tracks 1–4)
- L. E. Lofton – trombone (tracks 1–4)
- Harold (Sampson) Bennett – tenor saxophone, flute (tracks 1–4)
- Lawrence Frazier (tracks 1–4), Thornel Schwartz (tracks 5–7) – guitar
- Willie Jenkins – drums
- James Peacock – congas (tracks 1–4)
