= Village Vanguard Live Sessions 3 =

Live album by Thad Jones / Mel Lewis Jazz Orchestra
- Released: 1990?
- Recorded: 1967, The Village Vanguard, New York City
- Genre: Jazz
- Length: 62:13
- Label: LRC

Alternative cover
- Laserlight release cover

Professional ratings
Review scores
| Source | Rating |
|---|---|
| Allmusic | 3/5 stars |

Village Vanguard Live Sessions 3 is an unedited rough-mix of the Thad Jones / Mel Lewis Jazz Orchestra playing at the Village Vanguard club in New York City in 1967. The tracks were previously released on the album Live at the Village Vanguard on the Solid State Records label.

== Track listing ==
1. "Gettin' Sassy" ("Don't Get Sassy") – 8:40
2. "Little Pixie" – 10:35
3. "The Second Race" – 14:45
4. "Willow Tree" (Razaf, Waller) – 5:00
5. "A- That's Freedom" (H. Jones) – 9:23
6. "Quietude" – 5:00
7. "Baca Feelin'" ("Bachafillen") (Brown) – 8:50

All songs composed by Thad Jones except as noted.

== Personnel ==
- Thad Jones – flugelhorn
- Snooky Young – trumpet
- Jimmy Nottingham – trumpet
- Richard Williams – trumpet
- Bob Brookmeyer – trombone
- Garnett Brown – trombone
- Tom McIntosh – trombone
- Cliff Heather – bass trombone
- Jerome Richardson – alto saxophone
- Jerry Dodgion – alto saxophone
- Eddie Daniels – tenor saxophone
- Joe Farrell – tenor saxophone
- Pepper Adams – baritone saxophone
- Roland Hanna – piano
- Richard Davis – bass
- Mel Lewis – drums
