= Fly Dude =

Studio album by Jimmy McGriff
- Released: October 1972
- Recorded: 1972
- Studio: New York City
- Genre: Jazz
- Length: 43:55
- Label: Groove Merchant; GM 509
- Producer: Sonny Lester

Jimmy McGriff chronology
| Let's Stay Together (1972) | Fly Dude (1972) | Concert: Friday the 13th - Cook County Jail (1972) |

Fly Dude is an album by American jazz organist Jimmy McGriff featuring performances recorded in 1972 and released on the Groove Merchant label.

== Reception ==
Professional ratings
Review scores
| Source | Rating |
|---|---|
| Allmusic | 3.5/5 stars |

Allmusic's Steve Leggett said: "Soul-jazz and Hammond B3 pioneer Jimmy McGriff made the Groove Merchant record label his home base for the better part of the 1970s, releasing the often overlooked Fly Dude in 1972. This is McGriff at his most varied. ... Fly Dude has an ever-shifting perspective, and more than enough groove to keep everything sharp, all with a firm blues bases".

== Track listing ==
All compositions by Jimmy McGriff except where noted

1. "Everyday I Have the Blues" (Peter Chatman) – 3:42
2. "Jumping the Blues" (Jimmy Smith) – 4:15
3. "Healin' Feeling" (Les McCann) – 5:09
4. "Cotton Boy Blues" – 8:35
5. "Yardbird Suite" (Charlie Parker) – 6:38
6. "The Groove Fly" – 5:52
7. "It's You I Adore" (George Freeman) – 5:43
8. "Butterfly" – 4:01

== Personnel ==
- Jimmy McGriff – organ
- Ronald Arnold – tenor saxophone
- George Freeman, John Thomas – guitar
- Marion Booker Jr. – drums
