= 10 Years Hence =

Live album by Yusef Lateef
- Released: 1975
- Recorded: July 5–6, 1974
- Venue: Keystone Korner, San Francisco, California
- Genre: Jazz
- Length: 79:10
- Label: Atlantic; SD 2-1001
- Producer: Joel Dorn

Yusef Lateef chronology
| Part of the Search (1973) | 10 Years Hence (1975) | The Doctor Is In... and Out (1976) |

10 Years Hence is a live album by multi-instrumentalist Yusef Lateef recorded in 1974 at Keystone Korner in San Francisco and released on the Atlantic label.

== Reception ==
Professional ratings
Review scores
| Source | Rating |
|---|---|
| Allmusic | 3.5/5 stars |

Allmusic awarded the album 3 1/2 stars with the review by Thom Jurek stating, "This is not an album for everybody, but it is easily one of the most underrated sets in Lateef's vast catalog".

== Track listing ==
All compositions by Yusef Lateef except as indicated

1. "Samba de Amor (Fantasy): Samba de Amor (Part I)/Time Montage/Samba de Amor (Part II)" (Bob Cunningham) - 22:15
2. "Yusef's Mood" - 18:02
3. "But Beautiful" (Jimmy Van Heusen, Johnny Burke) - 12:25
4. "A Flower" (Kenny Barron) - 8:29
5. "I Be Cold" - 17:59

== Personnel ==
- Yusef Lateef – tenor saxophone, C flute, shanie, oboe, African thumb piano, percussion
- Kenny Barron – piano, cowbell, arranger, conductor
- Bob Cunningham – bass, African bells
- Albert Heath – drums, percussion, Indian flute
- Sanford Allen – violin (track 4)
- Gene Orloff – violin (track 4)
- Alfred Brown – viola (track 4)
- Kermit Moore – cello (track 4)
- Ernie Royal – trumpet (track 5)
- Joe Wilder – trumpet (track 5)
- Wayne Andre – trombone (track 5)
- Garnett Brown – trombone (track 5)
- Tony Studd – trombone (track 5)
- Eddie Daniels – alto saxophone (track 5)
- Bill Salter – electric bass (track 5)
- Eunice Peterson – back vocals (track 5)
- Rennelle Stafford – back vocals (track 5)
- Deidre Tuck – back vocals (track 5)
- Cissy Houston - back vocals, vocal arrangement (track 5)
