= Soul Sugar =

Studio album by Jimmy McGriff
- Released: 1970
- Recorded: 1970
- Studio: Bell Sound (New York City)
- Genre: Jazz
- Length: 30:53
- Label: Capitol; ST 616
- Producer: Sonny Lester

Jimmy McGriff chronology
| The Dudes Doin' Business (1970) | Soul Sugar (1970) | Something to Listen To (1970) |

Soul Sugar is an album by American jazz organist Jimmy McGriff featuring performances recorded in 1970 and released on the Capitol label.

== Reception ==
Professional ratings
Review scores
| Source | Rating |
|---|---|
| Allmusic | 4/5 stars |

Allmusic's Jason Ankeny said: "The Sonny Lester-produced Soul Sugar looms large in Jimmy McGriff's vast catalog – while it's a fool's errand to pick the organist's absolute funkiest recording, this one demands serious consideration".

== Track listing ==
All compositions by Jimmy McGriff except where noted

1. "Sugar, Sugar" (Jeff Barry, Andy Kim) – 2:45
2. "Ain't It Funky Now" (James Brown) – 3:36
3. "Signed, Sealed, Delivered I'm Yours" (Stevie Wonder, Lee Garrett, Syreeta Wright, Lula Mae Hardaway) – 2:45
4. "Dig on It" – 3:05
5. "Bug Out" – 3:01
6. "The Now Thing" – 2:50
7. "You're the One" (Sylvester Stewart) – 3:10
8. "Fat Cakes" (Raymond Greenwood) – 3:18
9. "New Volume" – 3:33
10. "Spirit in the Dark" (Aretha Franklin) – 2:50

== Personnel ==
- Jimmy McGriff – organ
- Murray Watson – trumpet
- Cliff Davis – tenor saxophone, flute
- Johnny Beard – baritone saxophone
- Horace Ott – electric piano
- Larry Frazier – guitar
- Richard Davis – bass
- Marion J. Booker – drums
- Lawrence Killian – congas, tambourine
