= It Takes a Whole Lot of Human Feeling =

1973 studio album by Carmen McRae

Studio album by Carmen McRae
- Released: 1973
- Recorded: February and March 1973
- Studio: Los Angeles, CA
- Genre: Jazz
- Length: 37:59
- Label: Groove Merchant GM 522
- Producer: Dave Pell

Carmen McRae chronology
The Great American Songbook (1972)	It Takes a Whole Lot of Human Feeling (1973)	Ms. Jazz (1974)

It Takes a Whole Lot of Human Feeling is an album by American jazz vocalist Carmen McRae recorded in 1973 and released on the Groove Merchant label. The album's title track is a song from the 1971 musical Don't Bother Me, I Can't Cope.

== Reception ==
Professional ratings
Review scores
Source	Rating
Allmusic	4/5 stars

Allmusic's Scott Yanow said: "Carmen McRae's charming version of Blossom Dearie's "Hey John" is enough of a reason to search for this album by itself ... Not all of the selections are of that quality, but overall, this is definitely a worthwhile acquisition for fans of the singer".

== Track listing ==
1. "It Takes a Whole Lot of Human Feeling" (Micki Grant) – 3:48
2. "I Fall in Love Too Easily" (Jule Styne, Sammy Cahn) – 3:47
3. "Hey John" (Blossom Dearie, Jim Council) – 3:23
4. "Where Are the Words" (Frank Severino) – 3:17
5. "Nice Work If You Can Get It" (George Gershwin, Ira Gershwin) – 2:50
6. "Straighten Up and Fly Right" (Nat King Cole, Irving Mills) – 2:47
7. "Inside a Silent Tear" (Dearie, Peter King) – 5:49
8. "Imagination" (Jimmy Van Heusen. Johnny Burke) – 4:22
9. "The Right to Love" (Lalo Schifrin, Gene Lees) – 4:14
10. "All the Things You Are" (Jerome Kern, Oscar Hammerstein II) – 3:59

== Personnel ==
- Carmen McRae − vocals
- Joe Pass − guitar
- Dick Shreve − piano
- Ray Brown − bass
- Larry Bunker − vibraphone, percussion
- Frank Severino − drums
