= Blues in Orbit (Gil Evans album) =

Studio album by Gil Evans
- Released: 1980
- Recorded: 1969 and 1971, New York City
- Genre: Jazz
- Length: 36:20
- Label: Enja 3069
- Producer: Sam Gordon

Gil Evans chronology
The Individualism of Gil Evans (1964)	Blues in Orbit (1980)	Satin Doll (1972)

Blues in Orbit is an album by jazz composer, arranger, conductor and pianist Gil Evans, recorded in 1969 and 1971 by Evans with an orchestra featuring Jimmy Cleveland, Howard Johnson, Billy Harper, and Joe Beck. The album was originally released on the short-lived Ampex label (with a different running order) as Gil Evans (1970) but received wider release on the Enja label under this title.

== Reception ==
The AllMusic review by Scott Yanow stated: "Arranger Gil Evans's first recording as a leader in five years found him leading an orchestra that could be considered a transition between his 1950s groups and his somewhat electric band of the 1970s... A near-classic release."

Professional ratings
Review scores
Source	Rating
AllMusic	4.5/5 stars
The Rolling Stone Jazz Record Guide	3/5 stars

== Track listing ==
All compositions by Gil Evans except as indicated

1. "Thoroughbred" (Billy Harper) - 4:57
2. "Spaced" - 3:04
3. "Love In the Open" (Warren Smith) - 6:49
4. "Variation on the Misery" - 3:03
5. "Blues In Orbit" (George Russell) - 6:49
6. "Proclamation" - 1:48
7. "General Assembly" (a.k.a. "Time of the Barracudas" by Miles Davis and Gil Evans) - 7:12
8. "So Long" - 2:27
- Recorded in New York in 1969 (tracks 2–4 & 6–8) and 1971 (tracks 1 & 5)

== Personnel ==
- Gil Evans - piano, electric piano, arranger, conductor
- Johnny Coles (tracks 1 & 5), Mike Lawrence (tracks 2–4 & 6–8), Ernie Royal (tracks 1 & 5), Snooky Young (tracks 2–4 & 6–8) - trumpet
- Garnett Brown (tracks 1 & 5), Jimmy Cleveland, Jimmy Knepper (tracks 2–4 & 6–8) - trombone
- Ray Alonge (tracks 1 & 5), Julius Watkins (tracks 2–4 & 6–8) - French horn
- Howard Johnson - tuba, baritone saxophone
- Hubert Laws - flute (tracks 2–4 & 6–8)
- Billy Harper - tenor saxophone
- George Marge - flute, tenor saxophone (tracks 1 & 5)
- Joe Beck - guitar (tracks 2–4 & 6–8)
- Gene Bianco - harp
- Herb Bushler - bass
- Elvin Jones (tracks 2–4 & 6–8), Alphonse Mouzon (tracks 1 & 5) - drums
- Sue Evans, Donald McDonald - percussion
