= Six Million Dollar Man (album) =

Studio album by Richard "Groove" Holmes
- Released: 1975
- Recorded: 1975
- Studio: Los Angeles
- Genre: Jazz, soul jazz
- Length: 39:39
- Label: RCA/Flying Dutchman; BDL1-1146
- Producer: Bob Thiele

Richard "Groove" Holmes chronology
Onsaya Joy (1975)	Six Million Dollar Man (1975)	I'm in the Mood for Love (1976)

Six Million Dollar Man, full title Theme from Six Million Dollar Man and Other Selections, is an album by organist Richard "Groove" Holmes, featuring material arranged and conducted by Oliver Nelson, recorded in 1975 and released by the Flying Dutchman label.

== Track listing ==
All compositions by Oliver Nelson except where noted

1. "Disc-O-Mite" (Richard "Groove" Holmes, Oliver Nelson) − 5:20
2. "Salsa de Alma" (Holmes) − 5:20
3. "Once Is Not Enough" (Henry Mancini, Larry Kusic) − 3:26
4. "Dumpy Mama" − 4:45
5. "Six Million Dollar Man Theme" − 5:54
6. "Double Scale" (Tom Scott) − 4:11
7. "125th St. and 7th Avenue" − 3:37
8. "Mama's Groove" (Holmes) − 7:06

== Personnel ==
- Richard "Groove" Holmes − organ
- Oscar Brashear, Charles Findley (tracks 3 & 5), Bobby Bryant (tracks 3 & 5) − trumpet
- Lloyd Ulyate, Garnett Brown, Maurice Spears − trombone (tracks 3 & 5)
- Tom Scott − tenor saxophone, flute, arranger, conductor
- Bud Shank, Jerome Richardson, Jack Nimitz, Gene Cipriano − woodwinds (tracks 3 & 5)
- Mike Wofford − piano, electric piano, ARP synthesizer
- David T. Walker − electric guitar
- Chuck Domanico (tracks 3 & 5), Chuck Rainey (tracks 1, 2, 4 & 6−8) − electric bass
- Jimmy Gordon (tracks 1, 2, 4 & 6−8), Shelly Manne (track 5) − drums
- Mailto Correa, Larry Bunker (tracks 3 & 5) − percussion
- Oliver Nelson − arranger, conductor (tracks 1−5, 7 & 8)
