= Onsaya Joy =

Live album by Groove Holmes
- Released: 1975
- Recorded: August 1974
- Venue: Half Note, New York City
- Genre: Jazz, soul jazz
- Length: 41:06
- Label: RCA/Flying Dutchman; BDL 1-0827
- Producer: Bob Thiele

Groove Holmes chronology
New Groove (1974)	Onsaya Joy (1975)	Six Million Dollar Man (1975)

Onsaya Joy is a live album by organist Groove Holmes recorded in 1974 and released by the Flying Dutchman label the following year.

== Track listing ==
1. "Sweet Georgia Brown" (Ben Bernie, Maceo Pinkard, Kenneth Casey) − 7:03
2. "Onsaya Joy" (Richard Holmes) − 15:10
3. "Green Dolphin Street" (Bronisław Kaper, Ned Washington) − 7:50
4. "Song for My Father" (Horace Silver) − 6:08
5. "Misty" (Erroll Garner, Johnny Burke) − 4:55

== Personnel ==
- Groove Holmes − organ, organic nova bass
- Orville J. Saunders II − guitar
- Thomas Washington, Jr. − drums
