= Stick It (Buddy Rich album) =

Studio album by Buddy Rich
- Released: 1972
- Recorded: August 10, 1972
- Genre: Jazz
- Length: 37:46
- Label: RCA Victor
- Producer: Pete Spargo

Buddy Rich chronology
Rich in London (1972)	Stick It (1972)	The Roar of '74 (1974)

Professional ratings
Review scores
Source	Rating
Allmusic	4/5 stars

Stick It is a 1972 studio album by Buddy Rich, with his big band. It was his third and final album on the RCA label.

== Track listing ==
LP side A

1. "Space Shuttle" (John LaBarbera) – 4:19
2. "God Bless the Child" (Arthur Herzog Jr., Billie Holiday) – 4:48
3. "Best Coast" (John LaBarbera) – 3:58
4. "Wave" (Antonio Carlos Jobim) – 4:15

LP side B

1. "Something" (George Harrison) – 3:25
2. "Uncle Albert/Admiral Halsey" (Paul McCartney, Linda McCartney) – 7:57
3. "Sassy Strut" (John LaBarbera) – 6:06
4. "Bein' Green" (Joe Raposo) – 2:58

bonus track on 1999 RCA CD re-issue

9. "Space Shuttle" – 10:38 (extended version)

Track order on CD re-issue differs from original LP

== Personnel ==
The Buddy Rich big band

- Buddy Rich – drums
- Joel DiBartolo – double bass
- Pat LaBarbera – flute, soprano saxophone, tenor saxophone
- Joe Romano – flute, alto saxophone
- Brian A. Grivna – flute, alto saxophone
- Don Englert – flute, tenor saxophone
- Walter Namuth – guitar
- George McFetridge – piano
- Richard Centalonza – baritone saxophone
- Eric Culver – trombone
- Alan Kaplan – trombone
- William Reichenbach – bass trombone
- Greg Hopkins – trumpet, arranger
- Lin Biviano, John DeFlon, Wayne Naus – trumpet

Production

- Pete Spargo – producer
- James Nichols – reissue producer
- Janet DeMatteis – art direction
- Jim Crotty – engineer
- Griffin Norman – design
- Chuck Stewart – photography
