= Lucky Thompson =

American jazz saxophonist (1924–2005)

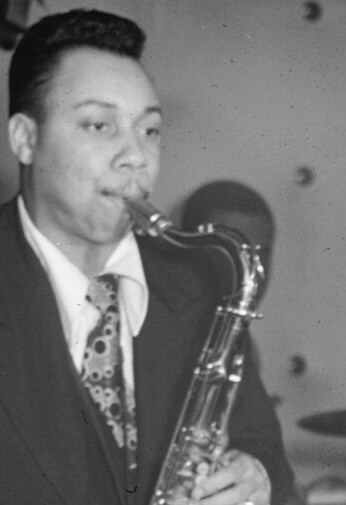
- Lucky Thompson at the Three Deuces, New York, 1947; Photo: William P. Gottlieb

Background information
- Born: Eli Thompson; June 16, 1924; Columbia, South Carolina, U.S.
- Origin: Detroit, Michigan, U.S.
- Died: July 30, 2005 (aged 81) Seattle, Washington, U.S.
- Genres: Jazz
- Occupation: Musician
- Instruments: Tenor saxophone; soprano saxophone
- Years active: 1942–1970s

Eli "Lucky" Thompson (June 16, 1924 – July 30, 2005) was an American jazz tenor and soprano saxophonist whose playing combined elements of swing and bebop. Although John Coltrane usually receives the most credit for bringing the soprano saxophone out of obsolescence in the early 1960s, Thompson (along with Steve Lacy) embraced the instrument earlier than Coltrane.

== Early life ==
Thompson was born in Columbia, South Carolina, United States, and moved to Detroit, Michigan, during his childhood. He had to raise his siblings after his mother died, and he practiced saxophone fingerings on a broom handle before acquiring his first instrument. He joined Erskine Hawkins's band in 1942 upon graduating from Cass Technical High School.

== Career ==
After playing with the swing orchestras of Lionel Hampton, Don Redman, Billy Eckstine (alongside Dizzy Gillespie and Charlie Parker), Lucky Millinder, and Count Basie, he worked in rhythm and blues and then established a career in bebop and hard bop, working with Kenny Clarke, Miles Davis, Gillespie, and Milt Jackson.

Critic Ben Ratliff observed that Thompson "connected the swing era to the more cerebral and complex bebop style. His sophisticated, harmonically abstract approach to the tenor saxophone built off that of Don Byas and Coleman Hawkins; he played with beboppers but resisted Charlie Parker's pervasive influence." He showed these capabilities as sideman on many albums recorded during the mid-1950s, such as Stan Kenton's Cuban Fire!, and those under his own name. He recorded with Parker (on two Los Angeles Dial Records sessions) and on Miles Davis's hard bop Walkin' session. Thompson recorded albums as leader for Disques Vogue (in Paris), ABC Paramount and Prestige and as a sideman on records for Savoy Records with Milt Jackson as leader.

Thompson was strongly critical of the music business, later describing promoters, music producers, and record companies as "parasites" or "vultures". This, in part, led him to move to Paris, where he lived and made several recordings between 1957 and 1962. During this time, he began playing soprano saxophone.

Thompson returned to New York, then lived in Lausanne, Switzerland, from 1968 until 1970, and recorded several albums there including A Lucky Songbook in Europe. He taught at Dartmouth College in 1973 and 1974, afterward leaving the music business entirely.

== Later life ==
Thompson's whereabouts after the mid-1970s are unclear; he is believed to have lived briefly on Manitoulin Island in Canada and in Savannah, Georgia.

In his last years, he lived in Seattle, Washington. Acquaintances reported that Thompson was homeless by the early 1990s and lived as a hermit.

Thompson died from Alzheimer's disease in an assisted living facility on July 30, 2005.

== Family ==
Thompson was married to Thelma Thompson, who died in 1963. Thompson's son, guitarist Daryl Thompson, played with Peter Tosh and Black Uhuru before embarking on a jazz career in the late 1980s. Thompson also had a daughter, Jade Thompson-Fredericks, and two grandchildren.

== Discography ==
=== As leader/co-leader ===
- 1944–46: Lucky Start
- 1944–47: The Chronological (Classics)
- 1954: Lucky Thompson & his Lucky Seven (MCA)
- 1954: Accent on Tenor Saxophone (Urania, 1954) – reissued by Fresh Sound
- 1956: Lucky Thompson Featuring Oscar Pettiford Vol. 1 (ABC Paramount, 1956)
- 1956–60: The Complete Vogue Recordings Vol. 1 & 2 (BMG, 1998) – the recordings made in France for the Vogue label
- 1956–59: Complete Parisian Small Group Sessions 1956–1959 (Fresh Sound, 2017)[(4×CD]
- 1956: In Paris 1956: The All Star Orchestra Sessions (Frech Sound, 2017)
- 1956: Thompson plays for Thompson (Jazztime)
- 1956: Modern Jazz Group (Le Club Français Du Disque, 1957) – reissued by Gitanes/Universal (2000) in the Jazz In Paris collection, by EmArcy (undated), and by Sunnyside (2000)
- 1956: Lucky Thompson (Swing) – reissued with the same title (Inner City Jazz Legacy, 1980)
- 1956: Brown Rose (Xanadu, 1956) – originally titled L T, Vol. 2 with Gérard Pochonet All Stars (Swing)
- 1956: Club Session n. IV (Le Club Français Du Disque, 1957) – with the Dave Pochonet All Stars; reissued by Gitanes/Universal (2001) in the Jazz In Paris collection and by Sunnyside (2001)
- 1956: Lucky Thompson Featuring Oscar Pettiford Vol. 2 (ABC Paramount, 1957)
- 1957: Paris Blues (Gitanes/Universal, 2000; Concord Jazz, 2000) – with Sammy Price; originally titled Sammy Price avec Lucky Thompson (Polydor, 1957)
- 1959: Lucky in Paris (Symphonium)
- 1961: Lord, Lord, Am I Ever Gonna Know? (Candid, 1961)
- 1963: Plays Jerome Kern and No More (Moodsville, 1963)
- 1964: Lucky Strikes (Prestige, 1964)
- 1965: Plays Happy Days Are Here Again (Prestige, 1965)
- 1965: Lucky is Back! (Rivoli, 1965)
- 1966: Kinfolks Corner (Rivoli, 1966)
- 1969: A Lucky Songbook in Europe (MPS, 1969)
- 1971: Soul's Nite Out (Ensayo, 1971)
- 1972: Goodbye Yesterday (Groove Merchant, 1973)
- 1972: Concert: Friday the 13th – Cook County Jail (Groove Merchant, 1973) – split album with Jimmy McGriff
- 1973: I Offer You (Groove Merchant, 1973)
- 1973: Back to the World (51 West, 1979)
- 1972–73: Lucky Thompson: Sonny Lester Collection (LRC, 1991) – reissued as Home Comin' (2003); compilation of tracks from Goodbye Yesterday! and Back To The World

=== As sideman ===
With Louis Armstrong

- Louis and the Angels (Decca, 1957)

With Harry Arnold

- Guest Book (Metronome, 1961)

With Art Blakey

- Soul Finger (Limelight, 1965)

With Benny Carter

- A Man Called Adam (Reprise, 1965)

With Kenny Clarke

- Kenny Clarke Plays Pierre Michelot (Columbia, 1957)

With Jimmy Cleveland

- Introducing Jimmy Cleveland and His All Stars (EmArcy, 1955)

With Johnny Dankworth

- The Zodiac Variations (Fontana, 1964)

With Miles Davis

- Walkin' (Prestige, 1954)

With Dizzy Gillespie

- Afro (Norgran, 1954)
- Dizzy and Strings (Norgran, 1954)

With Milt Jackson

- Meet Milt Jackson (Savoy, 1956)
- Roll 'Em Bags (Savoy, 1956)
- Jackson's Ville (Savoy, 1956)
- Ballads & Blues (Atlantic, 1956)
- The Jazz Skyline (Savoy, 1956)
- Plenty, Plenty Soul (Atlantic, 1957)

With Quincy Jones

- I/We Had a Ball (Limelight, 1964)

With Stan Kenton

- Cuban Fire! (Capitol, 1956)

With John Lewis

- The Modern Jazz Society Presents a Concert of Contemporary Music (Norgran, 1955)

With Thelonious Monk

- Genius of Modern Music: Volume 2 (Blue Note, 1952)

With Oscar Pettiford

- The Oscar Pettiford Orchestra in Hi-Fi (ABC-Paramount, 1956)
- The Oscar Pettiford Orchestra in Hi-Fi Volume Two (ABC-Paramount, 1957)

With Ralph Sharon

- Around the World in Jazz (Rama, 1957)

With Martial Solal

- Martial Solal et Son Grand Orchestre (Swing, 1957)

With Dinah Washington

- Mellow Mama (Delmark, 1945 [1992]) Apollo Records recordings
