= Joe Thomas (flautist) =

- Joe Thomas

Background information
- Born: Joseph Samuel Thomas; May 31, 1933; Newark, New Jersey, U.S.
- Died: July 26, 2017 (aged 84) Orange, New Jersey, U.S.
- Genres: Jazz, soul-jazz, disco
- Occupations: Musician, bandleader
- Instruments: Flute, Tenor Saxophone
- Years active: 1960–1980
- Labels: Groove Merchant, Sue, Chiaroscuro, Cobblestone, LRC

Joseph Samuel Thomas (May 31, 1933 - July 26, 2017) was an American jazz flutist and occasional saxophonist.

== Biography ==
As a child, Thomas learned to play alto and soprano saxophone, trombone, flute and piano, and also taught himself how to write music. Encouraged by his older brother, he began performing in clubs from the age of fifteen and was noticed by James Moody. After enlisting in the United States Army he received a Purple Heart during combat in the Korean War he returned to the US and performed with Specks Williams and joined Rhoda Scott's Trio in the early 1960s.

Thomas recorded with organist Jimmy McGriff and released several albums under his own name in the late 1970s and early 1980s.

In 1997, Beck sampled the song Venus from the album Feelin's from Within on his song The New Pollution.

== Discography ==
=== As leader ===
- Speak Your Piece (Sue, 1964)
- Comin' Home (Cobblestone, 1968)
- Is the Ebony Godfather (Today, 1971)
- Joy of Cookin' (Groove Merchant, 1972)
- Moog Fluting (GRC, 1974)
- Masada (Groove Merchant, 1975)
- Feelin's from Within (Groove Merchant, 1976)
- Here I Come (LRC, 1977)
- Get in the Wind (LRC, 1978)
- Make Your Move (LRC, 1979)
- Flash (Chiaroscuro, 1980)
- Sweet Cocoa (51 West, 1980)

=== As sideman ===
With Rhoda Scott

- Hey, Hey, Hey (Tru-Sound, 1962)
- Live!! at the Key Club (Tru-Sound, 1962)
- Live at the Olympia (Barclay, 1971)
- A L'Orgue Hammond Vol. 4 (Barclay, 1974)
- Take Five (Verve, 1991)

With others

- Ambersunshower, Walter T. Smith (Gee Street/Island, 1996)
- Jimmy McGriff, Stump Juice (Groove Merchant, 1975)
- Jimmy McGriff, The Mean Machine (Groove Merchant, 1976)
- Buddy Terry, Natural Soul (Prestige, 1968)
- Joe Tex, Rub Down (Epic, 1978)
