= Joe Romano =

American jazz musician (1932–2008)

- Born: April 17, 1932; Rochester, New York, United States
- Died: November 26, 2008 (aged 76) Rochester, New York, United States
- Genres: Jazz
- Instrument: Saxophone

Joseph S. Romano (April 17, 1932 – November 26, 2008) was an American jazz saxophonist.

He was born in Rochester, New York, United States. Romano learned to play clarinet and alto and tenor sax as a child. He enlisted in the United States Air Force in the 1950s, then joined the band of Woody Herman in 1956; he played intermittently with Herman into the 1970s, including at major jazz festivals and on several worldwide tours. In the 1960s, he also played with Chuck Mangione, Sam Noto, and Art Pepper; he was a recurring sideman on Buddy Rich's albums between 1968 and 1974. In the 1970s, he played with Les Brown, Louie Bellson, Chuck Israels, Sam Noto again, and with the Thad Jones-Mel Lewis Orchestra. He did session work in California in the 1980s, in addition to working with Frank Capp and Nat Pierce.

He died in Rochester in November 2008, from lung cancer, at the age of 76.

== Other sources ==
- Barry Kernfeld, "Joe Romano". The New Grove Dictionary of Jazz. Second edition.
