= Groove Merchant =

American jazz/R&B record label

- Founded: 1971
- Founder: Sonny Lester
- Distributor: Pickwick Records
- Genre: Jazz, R&B
- Country of origin: U.S.
- Official website: lrc-groovemerchantrecords.com

Groove Merchant was an American jazz and R&B record label during the 1970s. It was run by producer Sonny Lester and distributed by Pickwick Records. Notable artists included Chick Corea, O'Donel Levy, Buddy Rich, Jimmy McGriff, Lonnie Smith and Lionel Hampton. Lester would later close Groove Merchant and restructure it as Lester Radio Corporation, or LRC; TK Records were distributors for a period. Lester still retains the rights to the Groove Merchant/LRC back catalog and independently distributes them on compact disc.

== Discography ==
=== 500 Series ===
The Groove Merchant 500 Series consisted of 34 albums released between 1971 and 1974.

Catalog	Artist	Album	Notes
GM 501	O'Donel Levy	Black Velvet	
GM 502	Junior Parker	You Don't Have To Be Black To Love The Blues	UK title: Blue Shadows Falling
GM 503	Jimmy McGriff	Groove Grease	
GM 504	Joe Thomas	Joy of Cookin'	
GM 505	Groove Holmes	American Pie	
GM 506	Jimmy McGriff	Let's Stay Together	
GM 507	O'Donel Levy	Breeding of Mind	
GM 508	Lucky Thompson	Goodbye Yesterday	
GM 509	Jimmy McGriff	Fly Dude	
GM 510	Dakota Staton	Madame Foo-Foo	
GM 511	Reuben Wilson	The Sweet Life	
GM 512	Groove Holmes	Night Glider	
GM 513	Junior Parker	Love Ain't Nothin' But a Business Goin' On	originally released as The Outside Man on Capitol
GM 514	Larry Willis	Inner Crisis	
GM 515	Jimmy McGriff / Lucky Thompson + George Freeman + O'Donel Levy	Concert: Friday the 13th - Cook County Jail	Live split album
GM 516	Ramon Morris	Sweet Sister Funk	
GM 517	Lucky Thompson	I Offer You	
GM 518	O'Donel Levy	Dawn of a New Day	
GM 519	George Freeman	New Improved Funk	
GM 520	Jimmy McGriff and Groove Holmes	Giants of the Organ Come Together	
GM 521	Dakota Staton	I Want a Country Man	
GM 522	Carmen McRae	It Takes a Whole Lot of Human Feeling	
GM 523	Reuben Wilson	The Cisco Kid	
GM 524	No release issued for this part number		
GM 525	Mike Longo	Funkia	
GM 526	O'Donel Levy	Simba	
GM 527	Groove Holmes	New Groove	
GM 528	Buddy Rich	The Roar of '74	
GM 529	Jimmy McGriff	If You're Ready Come Go with Me	Compilation featuring tracks from Soul Sugar, Groove Grease, Let's Stay Together and Fly Dude, plus two previously unreleased tracks.
GM 530	Chick Corea	Sundance	Reissue of GM 2202
GM 531	Carmen McRae	Ms. Jazz	
GM 532	Dakota Staton	Ms. Soul	
GM 533	Zoot Sims and Bucky Pizzarelli + Buddy Rich	Nirvana	
GM 534	Jimmy McGriff	The Main Squeeze	
GM 535	O'Donel Levy	Everything I Do Gonna Be Funky	

=== 2200 Series ===
The 2200 Series, released in 1972, consisted of five albums which feature previously released and/or unissued material produced by Sonny Lester for various other labels.

Catalog	Artist	Album	Notes
GM 2201	Count Basie	Evergreens	originally released as Basic Basie on MPS.
GM 2202	Chick Corea	Sundance	previously unreleased tracks from the 'Is' recording sessions for Solid State.
GM 2203	Jimmy McGriff	Black and Blues	double LP of previously unreleased material recorded circa 1963.
GM 2204	Jeremy Steig	Fusion	double LP featuring tracks originally released as Energy on Capitol, along with a whole LP (=7 tracks) of previously unreleased material.
GM 2205	Jimmy McGriff and Junior Parker	Good Things Don't Happen Every Day	originally released as The Dudes Doin' Business on Capitol.

=== 3300 Series ===
The 3300 Series consisted of sixteen albums released between 1973 and 1976.

Catalog	Artist	Album	Notes
GM 3300	Jimmy McGriff and Groove Holmes	Giants of the Organ in Concert	Live 2LP set
GM 3301	Buddy Rich	Very Live at Buddy's Place	
GM 3302	Buddy Rich and Lionel Hampton	Transition	
GM 3303	Buddy Rich	The Last Blues Album Volume 1	Later issued on LRC as Loot To Boot under Illinois Jacquet's name.
GM 3304	Mike Longo	900 Shares of the Blues	
GM 3305	George Freeman	Man & Woman	
GM 3306	Lee Konitz	Chicago 'n All That Jazz	
GM 3307	Buddy Rich	Big Band Machine	
GM 3308	Lonnie Smith	Afro–desia	
GM 3309	Jimmy McGriff	Stump Juice	
GM 3310	Joe Thomas	Masada	
GM 3311	Jimmy McGriff	The Mean Machine	
GM 3312	Lonnie Smith	Keep on Lovin'	Reissued in 1977 on LRC/T.K. 9312
GM 3313	O'Donel Levy	Windows	Reissued in 1977 on LRC/T.K. 9313
GM 3314	Jimmy McGriff	Red Beans	Reissued in 1977 on LRC/T.K. 9314
GM 3315	Joe Thomas	Feelin's from Within	Reissued in 1977 on LRC/T.K. 9315

=== 4000 Series ===
The 4000 Series, released in 1974–1975, consisted of twelve double LP compilations of previously issued material.

- GM 4400 Lionel Hampton: The Works! (material later released as the single LPs: Hamp's Big Band Live! on Glad-Hamp, and Good Vibes on 51 West/CBS)
- GM 4401 Carmen McRae: Velvet Soul (compiles It Takes a Whole Lot of Human Feeling and Ms. Jazz)
- GM 4402 Groove Holmes: Hunk–a–Funk (compiles Night Glider and New Groove)
- GM 4403 Jimmy McGriff: Flyin' Time (compiles Fly Dude and Let's Stay Together)
- GM 4404 Reuben Wilson: Bad Stuff! (compiles The Sweet Life and The Cisco Kid)
- GM 4405 Various Artists: Blues in Concert (compiles selections from Jimmy McGriff/Junior Parker, Very Live at Buddy's Place, Concert: Friday the 13th - Cook County Jail, Giants of the Organ in Concert, plus two live tracks by Dakota Staton)
- GM 4406 Chick Corea / Mike Longo: Piano Giants (compiles Sundance and Funkia)
- GM 4407 Buddy Rich: Tuff Dude! (compiles The Roar of '74 and Very Live at Buddy's Place)
- GM 4408 O'Donel Levy: Hands of Fire (compiles Black Velvet and Simba)
- GM 4409 Jimmy McGriff and Groove Holmes: Supa Cookin' (compiles Giants of the Organ Come Together and the first LP from the Giants of the Organ in Concert 2LP set)
- GM 4410 Dakota Staton: Confessin' (compiles Madame Foo-Foo and I Want a Country Man)
- GM 4411 Lucky Thompson: Illuminations (compiles Goodbye Yesterday and I Offer You)
