= Dakota Staton =

American jazz vocalist (1930–2007)

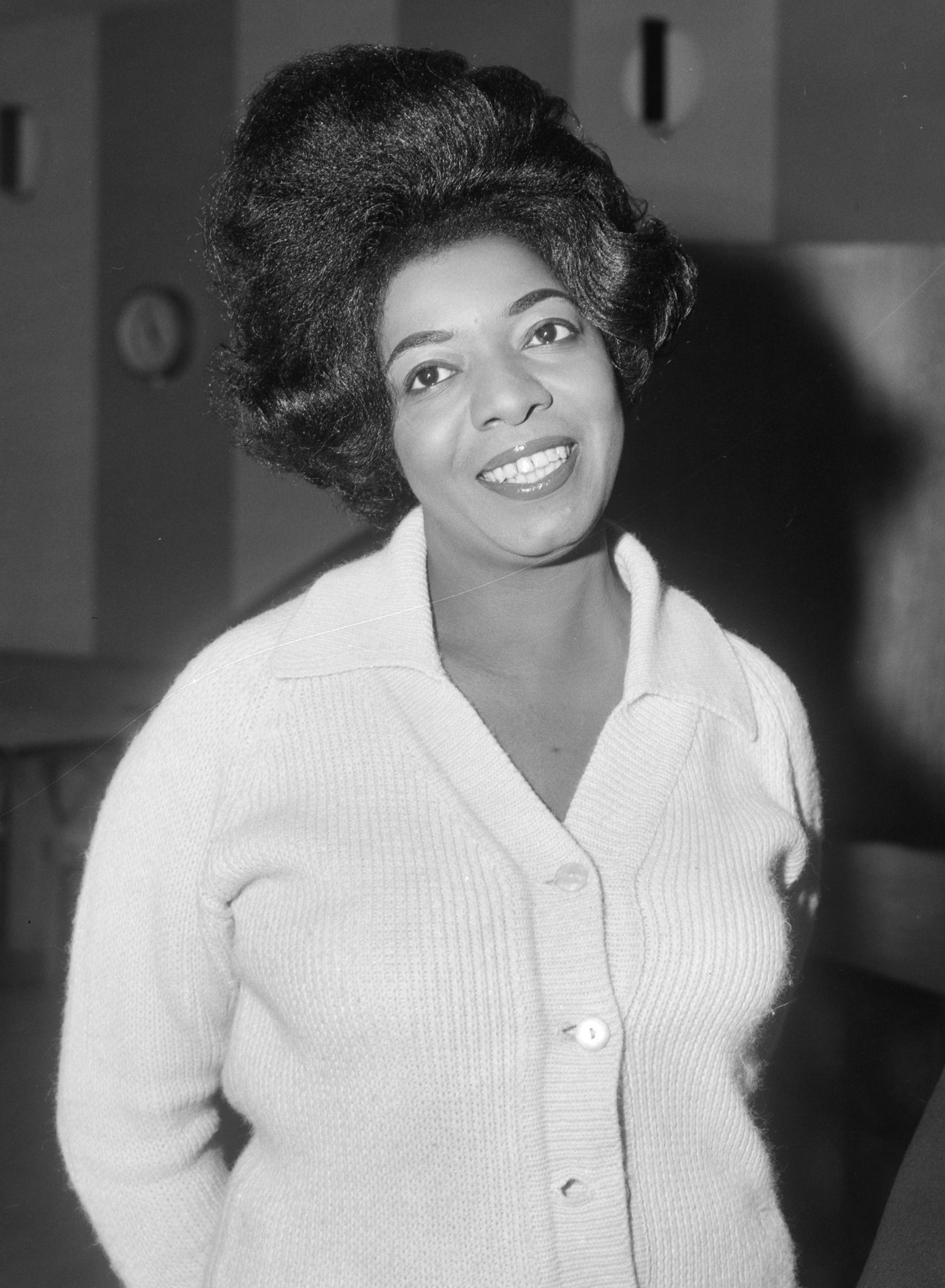
- Dakota Staton in 1965

Background information
- Born: Dakota Staton; June 3, 1930; Pittsburgh, Pennsylvania, U.S.
- Died: April 10, 2007 (aged 76) New York City, New York
- Genres: Jazz, R&B, soul, blues
- Occupation: Singer

Dakota Staton (June 3, 1930 – April 10, 2007) was an American jazz vocalist who found international acclaim with the 1957 No. 4 hit "The Late, Late Show". She was also known by the Muslim name Aliyah Rabia for a period due to her conversion to Islam as interpreted by the Ahmadiyya Muslim Community.

== Biography ==
Born in the Homewood neighborhood of Pittsburgh, Pennsylvania, she attended George Westinghouse High School, and studied music at the Filion School of Music in Pittsburgh. Later she performed regularly in the Hill District, a jazz hotspot, as a vocalist with the Joe Westray Orchestra, a popular Pittsburgh orchestra. She next spent several years in the nightclub circuit in such cities as Detroit, Indianapolis, Cleveland and St. Louis. While in New York, she was noticed singing at a Harlem nightclub called the Baby Grand by Dave Cavanaugh, a producer for Capitol Records. She was signed and released several singles, her success leading her to win Down Beat magazine's "Most Promising Newcomer" award in 1955. In 1958, Staton wed Talib Dawud, a black Antigua-born Ahmadi Muslim, a jazz trumpeter and noted critic of Elijah Muhammad. She subsequently converted to Islam and used the name Aliyah Rabia for some time. The marriage ultimately ended in divorce.

She released several critically acclaimed albums in the late 1950s and early 1960s, including: The Late, Late Show (1957), whose title track was her biggest hit, In the Night (1958), a collaboration with pianist George Shearing, Dynamic! (1958) and Dakota at Storyville (1962), a live album recorded at the Storyville jazz club in Boston. In the mid-1960s Staton moved to England, where she recorded the album Dakota ′67. Returning to the US in the early 1970s, she continued to record semi-regularly, her recordings taking an increasingly strong gospel and blues influence. She suffered a stroke in 1999, after which her health deteriorated. Staton died in New York City aged 76 in 2007.

== Discography ==
- The Late, Late Show (Capitol, 1957)
- Dynamic! (Capitol, 1958)
- In the Night with George Shearing (Capitol, 1958)
- Time to Swing (Capitol, 1959)
- More Than the Most (Capitol, 1959)
- Crazy He Calls Me (Capitol, 1959)
- Sings Ballads and the Blues (Capitol, 1960)
- Softly (Capitol, 1960)
- Dakota (Capitol, 1960)
- 'Round Midnight (Capitol, 1961)
- Dakota at Storyville (Capitol, 1962)
- From Dakota with Love (United Artists, 1962)
- Live and Swinging (United Artists, 1964)
- Dakota Staton with Strings (United Artists, 1964)
- Dakota '67 (London, 1966)
- I've Been There (Verve, 1970)
- Madame Foo-Foo (Groove Merchant, 1972)
- I Want a Country Man (Groove Merchant, 1973)
- Ms. Soul (Groove Merchant, 1974)
- Uniquely Dakota (Half Moon, 1983)
- No Man Is Going to Change Me (GP, 1985)
- Dakota Staton with Manny Albam (LRC, 1990)
- Dakota Staton (Muse, 1991)
- Moonglow (LRC, 1991)
- Darling Please Save Your Love for Me (Muse, 1992)
- Isn't This a Lovely Day (Muse, 1995)
- Congratulations (Giants of Jazz, 1999)
- A Packet of Love Letters (HighNote, 1999)
- Congratulations to Someone (LRC, 2002)
- Live at Milestones (Caffe Jazz, 2007)
