= Jimmy McGriff =

American jazz organist and bandleader (1936–2008)

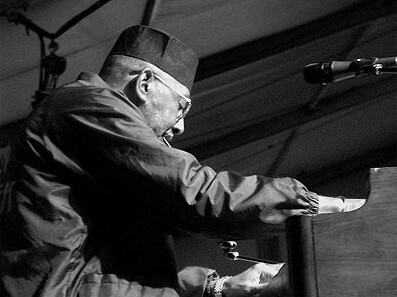
- McGriff in 2004

Background information
- Born: James Harrell McGriff; April 3, 1936; Philadelphia, Pennsylvania, U.S.
- Died: May 24, 2008 (aged 72) Voorhees Township, New Jersey, U.S.
- Genres: Jazz; blues; soul-jazz
- Occupation: Musician
- Instrument: Organ
- Years active: 1960–2007
- Labels: Groove Merchant; Jell; Sue; Solid State; Milestone; Telarc

James Harrell McGriff (April 3, 1936 – May 24, 2008) was an American hard bop and soul-jazz organist and organ trio bandleader.

== Biography ==
=== Early years and influences ===
Born in Germantown, Philadelphia, Pennsylvania, McGriff started playing piano at the age of five and by his teens had also learned to play vibes, alto sax, drums and upright bass. He played bass in his first group, a piano trio. When he joined the United States Army, McGriff served as a military policeman during the Korean War. He later became a police officer in Philadelphia for two years.

Music kept drawing McGriff's attention away from the police force. His childhood friend, organist Jimmy Smith, had begun earning a substantial reputation in jazz for his Blue Note albums (the two played together once in 1967) and McGriff became entranced by the organ sound while Richard "Groove" Holmes played at his sister's wedding. Holmes went on to become McGriff's teacher and friend and they recorded together on two occasions in 1973 for two Groove Merchant records.

McGriff bought his first Hammond B-3 organ in 1956, spent six months learning the instrument, then studied at New York's Juilliard School. He also studied privately with Milt Buckner, Jimmy Smith, and Sonny Gatewood. He was influenced by the energy and dynamics of organist Buckner and the diplomatic aplomb of Count Basie, and by local organists such as Howard "The Demon" Whaley and Austin Mitchell.

=== 1960s: First combos ===
McGriff formed a combo that played around Philadelphia and often featured tenor saxophonist Charles Earland (who soon switched permanently to organ, and became one of the instrument's renowned performers). During this time, McGriff also accompanied such artists as Don Gardner, Arthur Prysock, Candido and Carmen McRae, who came through town for local club dates.

In 1961, McGriff's trio was offered the chance to record an instrumental version of Ray Charles' hit "I've Got a Woman" by Joe Lederman's Jell Records, a small independent label. When the record received substantial local airplay, Juggy Murray's Sue label picked it up and recorded a full album of McGriff's trio, released in 1962. The album also turned out another hit in McGriff's "All About My Girl", establishing McGriff's credentials as a fiery blues-based organist, well-versed in gospel, soul and "fatback groove".

McGriff recorded a series of popular albums for the Sue label between 1962 and 1965, ending with what still stands as one of his finest examples of blues-based jazz, Blues for Mister Jimmy. When producer Sonny Lester started his Solid State record label in 1966, he recruited McGriff to be his star attraction. Lester framed McGriff in many different groups, performing a wide variety of styles and giving the organist nearly unlimited opportunities to record. McGriff was heard everywhere from an all-star tribute to Count Basie: The Big Band (1966), a series of "organ and blues band" albums such as Honey (1968) and A Thing to Come By (1969), funk classics like Electric Funk (1970), covering pop hits ("Cherry", "Blue Moon", "The Way You Look Tonight") and such original singles as "The Worm" and "Step One".

During this time, McGriff performed at clubs and concert halls worldwide. He settled in Newark, New Jersey, and eventually opened his own supper club, The Golden Slipper - where he recorded Black Pearl and another live album, Chicken Fried Soul with Junior Parker in 1971. Beginning in 1969, he also performed regularly with Buddy Rich's band, though the two were only recorded once together in 1974 on The Last Blues Album Volume 1.

=== 1970s–1980s ===
McGriff "retired" from the music industry in 1972 to start a horse farm in Connecticut. But Sonny Lester's new record company, Groove Merchant, kept issuing McGriff records at a rate of three or four a year. By 1973, McGriff was touring relentlessly and actively recording again. Around this time, disco was gaining a hold in jazz music and McGriff's flexibility proved infallible. He produced some of his best music during this period: Stump Juice (1975), The Mean Machine (1976), Red Beans (1976) and Outside Looking In (1978). These albums still stand out today as excellent documents of McGriff's organ playing.

By 1980, McGriff broke away from Sonny Lester and began working actively with producer Bob Porter (and recording engineer Rudy Van Gelder). McGriff began a long relationship with Milestone Records collaborating with Rusty Bryant, Al Grey, Red Holloway, David "Fathead" Newman, Frank Wess and Eric Alexander.

In 1986, McGriff started a popular partnership with alto saxophone player Hank Crawford. Their partnership yielded five co-leader dates for Milestone records: Soul Survivors (1986), Steppin' Up (1987), On the Blue Side (1989), Road Tested (1997), and Crunch Time (1999), as well as two dates for Telarc Records: Right Turn on Blue (1994) and Blues Groove (1995).

=== 1990s–2000s ===
Between 1994 and 1998, McGriff also experimented with the Hammond XB-3, an organ synthesizer that increased the organ's capabilities with MIDI enhancements. This gave McGriff an unnatural synthesized sound, which probably explains his retreat from the instrument on late recordings such as 2000's McGriff's House Party (featuring fellow organist Lonnie Smith). House Party did include the use of the XB-3; however, he did not use the MIDI functions.

McGriff was one of the first B3 players to add MIDI to the upper keyboard of his personal B3 to add and extend "his sound" beyond just the drawbar sound of the B3. He incorporated synthesizers in his live performances as he liked vibes, piano, strings, brass and other sounds that could only be created by a synthesizer and which the classic B3 cannot provide. Jimmy purchased the XB-3 as he had more control over the MIDI functions, and the XB-3 weighs about half of the classic B3, which made it easier to move.

Along with the soul-jazz sound, McGriff experienced renewed popularity in the mid-1990s, forming 'The Dream Team' group, which featured David "Fathead" Newman (a longtime saxophonist with Ray Charles) and drummer Bernard Purdie, and recording The Dream Team (1997), Straight Up (1998), McGriff's House Party (2000), Feelin' It (2001), and McGriff Avenue (2002) albums.

On March 29, 2008, McGriff was given a last private concert by Bill "Mr. B3" Dilks and drummer Grant MacAvoy in his honor in Voorhees Township, New Jersey. Dilks brought his B3 and played for McGriff, his wife Margaret, their guests, and the folks at the Genesis Health Care Center. As Dilks said, "The Hammond reaches its players far beyond where the conscious mind lives".

A resident of Voorhees Township, New Jersey, McGriff died there at age 72 on May 24, 2008, of complications of multiple sclerosis.

== Discography ==
=== As leader/co-leader ===
- I've Got a Woman (Sue, 1962)
- One of Mine (Sue, 1963)
- Jimmy McGriff at the Apollo [live] (Sue, 1963)
- Christmas with McGriff (Sue, 1963)
- Jimmy McGriff at the Organ (Sue, 1964)
- Topkapi (Sue, 1964)
- Blues for Mister Jimmy (Sue, 1965)
- Christmastime (Jell, 1965)
- Where the Action's At! [live] (Veep, 1966)
- The Big Band (Solid State, 1966) - also released as A Tribute to Basie
- A Bag Full of Soul (Solid State, 1966)
- Cherry (Solid State, 1966)
- A Bag Full of Blues (Solid State, 1967)
- I've Got a New Woman (Solid State, 1967)
- Honey (Solid State, 1968)
- The Worm (Solid State, 1968)
- Step 1 (Solid State, 1969)
- A Thing to Come By (Solid State, 1969)
- The Way You Look Tonight (Solid State, 1969)
- Electric Funk (Blue Note, 1970)
- The Dudes Doin' Business (Capitol, 1970) - with Junior Parker
- Soul Sugar (Capitol, 1970)
- Something to Listen To (Blue Note, 1971)
- Black Pearl [live] (Blue Note, 1971)
- Jimmy McGriff/Junior Parker [AKA Chicken Fried Soul] [live] (United Artists, 1971) - with Junior Parker
- Groove Grease (Groove Merchant, 1971)
- Let's Stay Together (Groove Merchant, 1966/1972 [rel. 1972])
- Fly Dude (Groove Merchant, 1972)
- Black and Blues (Groove Merchant, 1963/1971 [rel. 1972])
- Good Things Don't Happen Everyday (Groove Merchant, 1972) - reissue of The Dudes Doin' Business
- Concert: Friday the 13th - Cook County Jail [live] (Groove Merchant, 1973) - split album with Lucky Thompson + George Freeman + O'Donel Levy
- Giants of the Organ Come Together (Groove Merchant, 1973) - with Richard Groove Holmes
- Giants of the Organ in Concert [live] (Groove Merchant, 1973) - with Richard Groove Holmes
- The Main Squeeze (Groove Merchant, 1974)
- Stump Juice (Groove Merchant, 1975)
- The Mean Machine (Groove Merchant, 1976)
- Red Beans (Groove Merchant, 1976)
- Tailgunner (LRC [Lester Radio Corporation], 1977)
- Outside Looking In (LRC, 1978)
- City Lights (JAM [Jazz America Marketing], 1981)
- Movin' Upside the Blues (JAM, 1982)
- The Groover (JAM, 1982)
- Countdown (Milestone, 1983)
- Skywalk (Milestone, 1984)
- State of the Art (Milestone, 1985)
- Soul Survivors (Milestone, 1986) - with Hank Crawford
- The Starting Five (Milestone, 1987)
- Steppin' Up (Milestone, 1987) - with Hank Crawford
- Blue to the 'Bone (Milestone, 1988)
- On the Blue Side (Milestone, 1990) - with Hank Crawford
- You Ought to Think About Me (Headfirst, 1990)
- In a Blue Mood (Headfirst, 1991)
- Right Turn on Blue (Telarc, 1994) - with Hank Crawford
- Blues Groove (Telarc, 1996) - with Hank Crawford
- The Dream Team (Milestone, 1997)
- Road Tested (Milestone, 1997) - with Hank Crawford
- Straight Up (Milestone, 1998)
- Crunch Time (Milestone, 1999) - with Hank Crawford
- McGriff's House Party (Milestone, 2000) - with Dr. Lonnie Smith and Eric Alexander
- Feelin' It (Milestone, 2001)
- McGriff Avenue (Milestone, 2002)

=== LP/CD compilations ===
- A Toast to Jimmy McGriff's Greatest Hits (Sue, 1965)
- Jimmy McGriff's Greatest Organ Hits (Veep Records/United Artists, 1968)
- If You're Ready, Come Go with Me (Groove Merchant, 1974)
- Flyin' Time (Groove Merchant, 1975) 2LP
- Supa Cookin' (Groove Merchant, 1975) - with Richard Groove Holmes; 2LP
- Alive & Well (51 West/CBS, 1980) - Groove Merchant and LRC material
- Soul Brothers (Milestone, 1989) - with Hank Crawford
- Georgia On My Mind (LRC, 1989)
- The Jazz Collector Edition (Laserlight, 1991)
- Pullin' Out The Stops! The Best Of Jimmy McGriff [AKA Greatest Hits] (Blue Note, 1994)
- Funkiest Little Band In The Land (Laserlight, 1996)
- Dig On It: The Groove Merchant Years (Connoisseur Collection, 2000)
- 100% Pure Funk (LRC, 2001)
- The Best of Hank Crawford & Jimmy McGriff (Milestone, 2001)
- The Best of the Headfirst Years (Headfirst/K-Tel, 2003)
- The Best of the Sue Years 1962-1965 (Stateside, 2006)

=== Charted singles ===
Single	Year	US	US R&B
"I've Got A Woman (Part I)"	1962	20	5
"All About My Girl"	1963	50	12
"M.G. Blues"	1963	95	—
"The Last Minute (Part I)"	1963	99	—
"Kiko"	1964	79	19
"The Worm"	1968	97	28
