= Sonny Lester =

American record producer (1924–2018)

- Birth name: Sumner Lester
- Born: November 15, 1924 Melville, New York, U.S.
- Origin: New York City, New York, U.S.
- Died: April 28, 2018 (aged 93) University Park, Florida, U.S.
- Genres: Jazz, Lounge music
- Occupation(s): Musician, Producer, A&R
- Instrument: Trumpet
- Labels: Solid State Records, Blue Note Records, Lester Recording Catalog
- Formerly of: Chick Corea, Joe Williams, Dizzy Gillespie

Sumner Lester (November 15, 1924 – April 28, 2018), better known as Sonny Lester, was an American Grammy-award-winning music producer from New York City. He started his career as a musician in a big band jazz ensemble before being drafted into the U.S. Army. During the war he earned a Purple Heart and worked under Henry Kissinger, who was an intelligence officer at the time. Lester's recordings have been distributed by labels including Blue Note, United Artists, Capitol, Denon and CBS Records.

== Record label executive ==
In 1966, Lester formed Solid State, the jazz division of United Artists Records, with arranger Manny Albam and recording engineer Phil Ramone. He later formed Groove Merchant in the early 1970s The label released albums by jazz musicians such as Chick Corea, Joe Williams, Dizzy Gillespie, and Jimmy McGriff. When his distribution deal ran out in the mid-1970s, he launched LRC Records, continuing to release albums by jazz artists such as Jimmy McGriff, Jimmy Ponder, Joe Thomas and Brad Baker, which generally had a contemporary soul/disco flavor. The Thad Jones/Mel Lewis Orchestra, called simply "The Orchestra" on the first album, recorded all of their early and most influential albums for Solid State. The label was eventually consolidated into Blue Note Records and Lester was named producer of the Denon Jazz series in 1986.

By 1993, The New York Times reported that his record company, Lester Recording Catalog (LRC, Ltd.), had "nearly 150 titles, and annual revenues are $3 million to $4 million."

LRC releases jazz records as CDs. In the early 1990s, Lester retained the rights to a number of records he produced in the 1960s and 1970s and reissued them as CDs on LRC. The company's catalog includes recordings by Dave Brubeck, Count Basie, Chick Corea, and Dizzy Gillespie. LRC has also sold original recordings by emerging jazz acts. In a 1993 interview with Crain's New York Business, Lester said, "Record companies are so big and monstrous, they don't have the time to nurture jazz artists. We do. We speak their language and the artists know and respect us, so they feel comfortable here."

== Personal life and death ==
Lester died in University Park, Florida on April 28, 2018, at the age of 93.
