= Bomb the Rocks: Early Days Singles 1989–1996 =

Compilation album by The 5.6.7.8's
- Released: 2003
- Genre: Garage rock; rockabilly; rock and roll; punk rock
- Label: Time Bomb

The 5.6.7.8's chronology
Teenage Mojo Workout (2002)	Bomb the Rocks: Early Days Singles 1989–1996 (2003)	Tanukigoten (2014)

Professional ratings
Review scores
Source	Rating
AllMusic	4.5/5 stars

Bomb the Rocks: Early Days Singles 1989–1996 is a compilation by the 5.6.7.8's which was released in 2003.

== Track listing ==
1. "Bomb the Twist"
2. "Jane in the Jungle"
3. "Three Cool Chicks"
4. "Guitar Date"
5. "Woo Hoo"
6. "Dream Boy"
7. "Continental Hop"
8. "Jump Jack, Jump"
9. "Smilly Willy"
10. "Mr. Lee"
11. "It's Rainy"
12. "Road Runner"
13. "My Boyfriend from Outer Space"
14. "She Was a Mau Mau"
15. "Long Tall Sally"
16. "Scream"
17. "Hot Generation"
18. "Bond Girl"
19. "Fruit Bubble Love"
20. "Motor Cycle Go-Go-Go"
21. "Jet Coaster"
22. "The 5.6.7.8's"
23. "Edie Is a Sweet Candy"
24. "I Was a Teenage Cave Woman"
25. "Ah-So"
26. "Pinball Party"
27. "Blue Radio"
28. "Oriental Rock"
