= The Essential George Benson =

2006 album by George Benson

Compilation album by George Benson
- Released: March 28, 2006
- Recorded: June 5, 1963 – August 11, 1980
- Genre: Jazz
- Length: 2:27:38
- Labels: Columbia; Legacy; Sony Music
- Producers: Lew Futterman; John Hammond; Teo Macero; Creed Taylor; Didier C. Deutsch; Tommy LiPuma; Quincy Jones; Tony Williams

George Benson chronology
Givin' It Up (2006)	The Essential George Benson (2006)	Live from Montreux (2007)

The Essential George Benson is a compilation album by American jazz musician George Benson, released in 2006 as a double-disc, 21-track career-spanning anthology. It is part of Sony BMG's Essential series of compilation albums.

== Reception ==
Professional ratings
Review scores
Source	Rating
AllMusic	3.5/5 stars
PopMatters	6/10 stars

Jazz Times refers to the album as "an extraordinary musician by any standard, Benson comes close to redeeming some horribly dated CTI material, including 'White Rabbit', a landmark in schlock. There are also highlights from other key players-don’t miss Kenny Barron’s Rhodes solo on the 1974 Don Sebesky arrangement of 'Take Five.' Write off the R&B tracks if you must, but they’re flawlessly realized. 'This Masquerade' is a model of pure, economical soul singing. 'On Broadway' appears in a 10-minute live version."

== Track listing ==
=== Disc one ===
No.	Title	Writer(s)	Originally from	Length
1.	"Rock Candy" (Live, featuring Jack McDuff)	Jack McDuff	Rock Candy (1972)	6:12
2.	"Shadow Dancers"	George Benson	The New Boss Guitar of George Benson (1964)	4:45
3.	"Clockwise"	George Benson	It's Uptown (1966)	4:28
4.	"Willow Weep for Me"	Ann Ronell	It's Uptown (1966)	7:48
5.	"A Foggy Day"	George Gershwin, Ira Gershwin	It's Uptown (1966)	2:39
6.	"The Borgia Stick"	George Benson	The George Benson Cookbook (1967)	3:09
7.	"Paraphernalia" (featuring Miles Davis)	Wayne Shorter	Miles in the Sky (1968)	12:38
8.	"Sugar" (featuring Stanley Turrentine)	Stanley Turrentine	Sugar (1970)	10:05
9.	"So What"	Miles Davis	Beyond the Blue Horizon (1971)	9:19
10.	"Ode to a Kudu"	George Benson	Beyond the Blue Horizon (1971)	4:41
11.	"California Dreaming"	John Phillips, Michelle Phillips	White Rabbit (1972)	7:19

=== Disc two ===
No.	Title	Writer(s)	Originally from	Length
1.	"White Rabbit"	Grace Slick	White Rabbit (1972)	6:56
2.	"Body Talk"	George Benson	Body Talk (1973)	8:22
3.	"Take Five"	Paul Desmond	Bad Benson (1974)	7:07
4.	"Summertime" (Live)	George Gershwin	In Concert-Carnegie Hall (1976)	6:05
5.	"Breezin'"	Bobby Womack	Breezin' (1976)	5:21
6.	"This Masquerade"	Leon Russell	Breezin' (1976)	8:04
7.	"On Broadway"	Jerry Leiber and Mike Stoller, Barry Mann, Cynthia Weil	Weekend in L.A. (1978)	10:10
8.	"Give Me the Night"	Rod Temperton	Give Me the Night (1980)	5:02
9.	"Hip Skip" (featuring Tony Williams)	George Benson	The Joy of Flying (1978)	8:07
10.	"Gotham City" (featuring Dexter Gordon)	Dexter Gordon	Gotham City (1980)	9:19

== Release history ==
Country	Date	Label	Format	Catalog
Worldwide	March 28, 2006	Columbia Records, Legacy Records	CD	118065/2005330
