= Pecker (film) =

- Theatrical release poster
- Directed by: John Waters
- Written by: John Waters
- Produced by: John Fiedler; Mark Tarlov; Mark Ordesky; Pat Moran
- Starring: Edward Furlong; Christina Ricci; Bess Armstrong; Mary Kay Place; Martha Plimpton; Brendan Sexton III; Mink Stole; Lili Taylor
- Cinematography: Robert M. Stevens
- Edited by: Janice Hampton
- Music by: Stewart Copeland
- Production company: Polar Entertainment
- Distributed by: Fine Line Features
- Release date: September 25, 1998
- Running time: 86 minutes
- Country: United States
- Language: English
- Budget: $6 million
- Box office: $2.3 million

Pecker is a 1998 American film written and directed by John Waters. The film chronicles the rise to fame and potential fortune of a budding photographer played by Edward Furlong. It co-stars Christina Ricci, Lili Taylor, Mary Kay Place, Martha Plimpton, Brendan Sexton III, and Bess Armstrong. Like other films by Waters, it was filmed and set in Baltimore. Pecker received mixed reviews from critics, and grossed only $2.3 million against a $6 million budget.

== Plot ==
In a Baltimore neighborhood known for having the thickest local accent, unassuming 18-year-old Pecker works in a sandwich shop and takes photos of his loving but peculiar family and friends on the side. Pecker, named for his childhood habit of "pecking" at his food, becomes unexpectedly popular when savvy New York art dealer Rorey Wheeler "discovers" his work. Pecker's pictures, taken with a cheap Canon Canonet 28, are grainy, out-of-focus studies of unglamorous subjects, but they strike a chord with New York art collectors.

Unfortunately, Pecker discovers that instant over-exposure has its downsides. Rorey's efforts to turn Pecker into an art sensation threaten to ruin the low-key lifestyle that inspired him. He abandons his trusty old rangefinder camera for a new, full-featured Nikon N50. Pecker finds that his best friend, Matt, cannot shoplift anymore because Pecker's photographs have increased his visibility. Shelley, Pecker's obsessive girlfriend who runs a laundromat, seems especially distressed when the press dub her a "stain goddess", mistaking her good-natured "pin-up" poses for pornographic come-ons.

When an overzealous critic dubs Pecker's family "culturally challenged", they begin to feel the uncomfortable glare of stardom. His mother Joyce can no longer freely dispense fashion tips to the homeless clientele at her thrift shop; his grandmother, Memama, endures public ridicule when her experience with a talking statue of the Virgin Mary is exposed on the cover of a national art magazine, and his older sister Tina is fired from her job emceeing go-go dancing at a gay bar because Pecker's edgy photographs chronicle the sex practices of the club's patrons. Even Little Chrissy, his six-year-old sister, feels the pressure of celebrity when her eating disorder is exposed, bringing unwanted attention from nosy child welfare agencies, and she is mistakenly diagnosed with Attention-Deficit Hyperactivity Disorder and prescribed Ritalin.

Having seen his new-found fame disrupt the lives of his family and friends, Pecker upsets the art world by refusing to participate in a scheduled show at the Whitney Museum of Art. Instead, he forces New York art collectors to come to Baltimore to see his latest photographs, which insultingly portray the same people who disparaged his family, with one photo showing Lynn Wentworth adjusting her breasts in a mirror.

Asked what he plans to do next, Pecker replies that he would like to direct a film.

== Cast ==
- Edward Furlong as Pecker
- Christina Ricci as Shelley
- Lili Taylor as Rorey Wheeler
- Mary Kay Place as Joyce
- Martha Plimpton as Tina
- Brendan Sexton III as Matt
- Bess Armstrong as Dr. Klompus
- Lauren Hulsey as Little Chrissy
- Mark Joy as Jimmy
- Mink Stole as Precinct Captain
- Patricia Hearst as Lynn Wentworth
- Jean Schertler as Memama
- Alan J. Wendl as Mr. Nellbox
- Greg Gorman as himself
- Cindy Sherman as herself
- Mary Vivian Pearce as Homophobic Lady
- Anthony Roger as Billy Heckman/Death Row Dave
- Doug Roberts as Mr. Heckman
- Patsy Grady Adams as Mrs. Heckman
- Susan Greenhill as voice of Miraculous Virgin Mary
- Bobby J. Brown as Average Joe
- John Waters (uncredited) as Pervert on Phone
- Stacy Keibler (uncredited) as Blonde on Bus
- Brian Thomas as Larry the Lughead

== Production ==
Tobey Maguire was initially offered the title role.

Like other films by Waters, Pecker was filmed and set in Baltimore. Specifically, the film was set in the Hampden neighborhood.

== Reception ==
On Rotten Tomatoes, the film has an approval rating of 52%, based on 46 reviews, with an average rating of 5.9/10. On Metacritic, it has a score of 66 out of 100, based on 24 reviews, indicating "generally favorable reviews".

Describing it as "John Waters' first stab at making a mainstream movie," Edvins Beitiks' review in The San Francisco Examiner said it "starts out well and winds up no worse than most of the stuff that comes out of Hollywood". In his review for the Chicago Sun-Times, Roger Ebert noted a "tension between the gentler new Waters and his anarchic past. In the scenes in the male strip bar, for example, we keep waiting for Waters to break loose and shock us, and he never does, except with a few awkward language choices. The miraculous statue of Mary could have provided comic possibilities, but doesn't." Peter Stack of the San Francisco Chronicle wrote that Pecker is "never truly funny, but it's an amusing novelty, gaining strength from smart characterizations and sly cogency about the way people are exploited under the limelight of celebrity."

Pecker grossed approximately $2.3 million worldwide, which was less than half of its $6 million budget.

== Soundtrack ==
The soundtrack was released on September 29, 1998 by New Line Records.

1. "Happy-Go-Lucky Me" – Paul Evans
2. "The Love Chase" – Stewart Copeland
3. "I'm a Nut" – Leroy Pullins
4. "Memama" – Stewart Copeland
5. "Uh! Oh! (Part 1)" – The Nutty Squirrels
6. "Straight Boys" – Vicky Randle and Stewart Copeland
7. "I'm Gonna Sit Right Down and Write Myself a Letter" – Billy Williams
8. "In the Mood" – Henhouse Five Plus Too (Ray Stevens)
9. "Back to Hampden/Sneaky Shelly" – Stewart Copeland
10. "Baltimore, You're Home to Me" – Dave Hardin
11. "Thrift Shop Fashion Shoot" – Stewart Copeland
12. "Don't Drop the Soap (For Anyone Else But Me)" – Stan Ridgway and Stewart Copeland
13. "New York Montage" – Stewart Copeland
14. "Swamp Thing" – The Grid
15. "Woo-Hoo" – The Rock-A-Teens
