= Kill Bill Vol. 1 (soundtrack) =

2003 soundtrack album

Kill Bill Vol. 1 Original Soundtrack

Soundtrack album to Kill Bill: Volume 1 by RZA and various artists
- Released: September 23, 2003
- Genres: Folk rock; country; film score; hip hop; funk; instrumental rock; disco; rockabilly; enka
- Length: 47:02
- Languages: English; Japanese
- Labels: A Band Apart; Maverick; Warner Bros.
- Producers: The RZA; Quentin Tarantino; Lawrence Bender

RZA film soundtrack chronology
The World According to RZA (2003)	Kill Bill Vol. 1 Original Soundtrack (2003)	Birth of a Prince (2003)

Professional ratings
Review scores
Source	Rating
Allmusic	4.5/5 stars
IGN	(8.0/10)
Stylus	A−

Kill Bill Vol. 1 Original Soundtrack is the soundtrack to the first volume of the two-part Quentin Tarantino film Kill Bill. Released on September 23, 2003, it reached No. 45 on the Billboard 200 album chart and No. 1 on the soundtracks chart. It was organized, and mostly produced and orchestrated by RZA from the Wu-Tang Clan.

== Soundtrack development ==
In a 2003 Interview, RZA spoke about the soundtrack's creation process:

It was more of a collaboration. He had an idea and a vision when he wrote the script. I think I was more of somebody that kept it in the guidelines of what he wanted. He was like, here go the eggs, the milk, the cake, the sugar, everything, and I'm going to stir it up. Put this in the oven, watch it, take it out in forty-five minutes. Now, am I going to take it out in forty five minutes or am I going to fall asleep? I made sure it got out and if I saw something wrong with it, I fixed it. So when he saw it, he was like, this is cake. There was one situation where you see, "Crane and White Lightning." That's part of the original score, so it's not really a song. A lot of that stuff is what I use to keep the vibe going between songs. "Crane and White Lightning" is a piece of music that Quentin wanted on the soundtrack, but was originally set for a Metallica track. There's only one piece of music that I didn't feel comfortable with when we were done. We lost a sample, I made one Hip Hop beat. I was like I gotta throw one in there. Quentin loved this beat. We rocked with it and it was one of the first things we did. I could've gotten away with it. It was a sample, but so undetectable. So unnoticeable. I wanted to take a chance, but in the movie business you can't take those kind of chances. I wouldn't risk nobody else. If it was my movie, I would have taken a chance. But this is Quentin Tarantino's movie.

== Track listing ==
No.	Title	Writer(s)	Artist(s)	Length
1.	"Bang Bang (My Baby Shot Me Down)"	Sonny Bono	Nancy Sinatra	2:40
2.	"That Certain Female"	Charlie Feathers	Charlie Feathers	3:02
3.	"The Grand Duel (Parte Prima) (Note: Originally from the 1972 film The Grand Duel)"	Luis Bacalov	Luis Bacalov	3:24
4.	"Twisted Nerve (Note: Originally from the 1968 film Twisted Nerve)"	Bernard Herrmann	Bernard Herrmann	1:27
5.	"Queen of the Crime Council" (Dialogue)	Quentin Tarantino	Lucy Liu and Julie Dreyfus	0:56
6.	"Ode to Oren Ishii (Note: Incorporates "Seven Notes in Black" by Vince Tempera)"	The RZA; Fabio Frizzi; Franco Bixio; Vince Tempera	The RZA	2:05
7.	"Run Fay Run (Note: Originally from the 1974 film Three Tough Guys)"	Isaac Hayes	Isaac Hayes	2:46
8.	"Green Hornet"	Billy May	Al Hirt	2:18
9.	"Battle Without Honor or Humanity (Note: Originally from the 2000 film New Battles Without Honor or Humanity)"	Tomoyasu Hotei	Tomoyasu Hotei	2:28
10.	"Don't Let Me Be Misunderstood / Esmeralda Suite"	Bennie Benjamin; Horace Ott; Sol Marcus; Jean De Scarano; Nicolas Skarsky; Raymond Donnez	Santa Esmeralda featuring Leroy Gómez	10:29
11.	"Woo Hoo"	George Donald McGraw	The 5.6.7.8's	1:59
12.	"Crane/White Lightning (Note: Original version from the 1973 film White Lightning)"	The RZA; Charles Bernstein	The RZA and Charles Bernstein	1:37
13.	"The Flower of Carnage (Note: Originally from the 1973 film Lady Snowblood)" (修羅の花; Shura no Hana)	Kazuo Koike; Masaaki Hirao	Meiko Kaji	3:52
14.	"The Lonely Shepherd"	James Last	Gheorghe Zamfir	4:20
15.	"You're My Wicked Life" (Dialogue)	Quentin Tarantino	David Carradine, Julie Dreyfus, and Uma Thurman	1:14
16.	"Ironside (Note: Originally from the 1967 TV series Ironside)" (Excerpt)	Quincy Jones	Quincy Jones	0:16
17.	"Super 16 (Note: Originally from the 1973 album Neu! 2 and featured in the 1976 film Master of the Flying Guillotine)" (Excerpt)	Klaus Dinger; Michael Rother	Neu!	1:06
18.	"Yakuza Oren 1"		The RZA	0:22
19.	"Banister Fight"		The RZA	0:21
20.	"Flip Sting" (SFX)			0:04
21.	"Sword Swings" (SFX)			0:05
22.	"Axe Throws" (SFX)			0:11
Total length:				47:02

The last three are merely noises that occur as sound effects in the film. The vinyl record version includes only the first fifteen tracks.

== Also not included ==
Numerous tracks used in the film and to advertise it were not included in the soundtrack album:

- "Seven Notes in Black" by Vince Tempera – From Sette note in nero ("Seven Notes in Black"; AKA The Psychic). Heard when The Bride awakens and fends off her would-be rapists; background music for the RZA's "Ode to O-ren"
- "Truck Turner Theme" by Isaac Hayes – heard, appropriately enough, when The Bride tracks down Buck's truck.
- "Music Box Dancer" by Frank Mills - heard when the Bride pulls up to Vernita Green's house.
- "A Long Day of Vengeance" by Armando Trovaioli – From I lunghi giorni della vendetta. Heard in the anime sequence after one of Boss Matsumoto's men murders O-Ren's father.
- "Kaifuku Suru Kizu (The Wound That Heals)" by Lily Chou-Chou – From the film All About Lily Chou-Chou. Heard when The Bride marvels at Hattori Hanzo's sword collection.
- "I'm Blue" and "I Walk Like Jayne Mansfield" – additional songs performed by the 5.6.7.8's in the House of Blue Leaves.
- "From Man to Man" from the Death Rides a Horse soundtrack by Ennio Morricone – heard in the House of Blue Leaves battle. Used prominently to advertise Kill Bill.
- "Kenka Karate Kyokushin Ken Opening Theme" – heard in the house of Blue Leaves when the bride fights the boss of the crazy 88s.
- "Nobody but Me" by The Human Beinz – heard in the House of Blue Leaves battle.
- "Police Check Point" by Harry Betts (from the film Black Mama White Mama) – heard briefly in the House of Blue Leaves battle.
- "Yagyu Conspiracy" by Toshiaki Tsushima (from Shogun's Samurai) – background music for "You're My Wicked Life"
- "Funky Fanfare" by Keith Mansfield – heard as the logo music for the Our Feature Presentation film snipe.
- "I Giorni Dell'Ira" by Riz Ortolani (from Day of Anger) – heard when The Bride plucks an eye from one of the Crazy 88. This track would be later used in Django Unchained, where it was included in the soundtrack.
- "Champions of Death" by Shunsuke Kikuchi (from Champion of Death) – heard in the House of Blue Leaves battle.
- Other brief clips are not included nor are credits as to who wrote or performed them available.

== Charts ==
=== Weekly charts ===
Chart (2003–2004)	Peak position
Australian Albums (ARIA)	22
Austrian Albums (Ö3 Austria)	3
Belgian Albums (Ultratop Flanders)	10
Belgian Albums (Ultratop Wallonia)	43
Canadian Albums (Billboard)	24
Dutch Albums (Album Top 100)	16
Finnish Albums (Suomen virallinen lista)	27
French Albums (SNEP)	19
German Albums (Offizielle Top 100)	11
Hungarian Albums (MAHASZ)	38
Norwegian Albums (VG-lista)	13
Spanish Albums (Promusicae)	25
Swiss Albums (Schweizer Hitparade)	10
US Billboard 200	45
US Soundtrack Albums (Billboard)	1

=== Year-end charts ===
Chart (2003)	Position
Austrian Albums (Ö3 Austria)	57
Swiss Albums (Schweizer Hitparade)	74
Chart (2004)	Position
French Albums (SNEP)	122

== Certifications ==
Region	Certification	Certified units/sales
Australia (ARIA)	Gold	35,000^{^}
Belgium (BRMA)	Gold	25,000^{*}
Canada (Music Canada)	Gold	50,000^{^}
France (SNEP)	2× Gold	200,000^{*}
Greece (IFPI Greece)	Gold	10,000^{^}
Switzerland (IFPI Switzerland)	Gold	20,000^{^}
United Kingdom (BPI)	Gold	100,000^{^}
United States (RIAA)	Gold	502,000
^{*} Sales figures based on certification alone.^{^} Shipments figures based on certification alone.

== See also ==
- Kill Bill Vol. 2 (soundtrack)
