= Charlie Brown (The Coasters song) =

1959 song by the Coasters

Single by The Coasters
- B-side: "Three Cool Cats"
- Released: January 1959
- Recorded: December 11, 1958
- Genre: Rhythm and blues; rock and roll
- Length: 2:19
- Label: Atco 6132
- Songwriter: Jerry Leiber and Mike Stoller
- Producers: Jerry Leiber and Mike Stoller

The Coasters singles chronology
"The Shadow Knows" (1958)	"Charlie Brown" (1959)	"Along Came Jones" (1959)

"Charlie Brown" is a popular Jerry Leiber and Mike Stoller song that was a top-ten hit for the Coasters in the spring of 1959 (released in January, coupled with "Three Cool Cats", Atco 6132). It went to No. 2 on the Billboard Hot 100 singles chart, while "Venus" by Frankie Avalon was at No. 1. It reached No. 1 in Canada. It was the first of three top-ten hits for the Coasters that year. It is best known for the phrase "Why's everybody always pickin' on me?"

According to Jerry Leiber, "After 'Yakety Yak', I thought we could write every Coasters song in ten minutes. Man, was I wrong! When we tried to write a follow-up, Mike had lots of musical ideas, but I was stuck. … After nearly a week of agonizing, a simple name came to mind. 'Charlie Brown.' Then, 'He's a clown, that Charlie Brown.' Mike already had a skip-along melodic template in place. He helped me with the story and suddenly a character, played by Dub Jones, stepped out on stage."

Towards the end of the bridge of the song, the words "Yeah, You!" were recorded at half speed, so the voices would play back at a higher pitch. King Curtis plays the tenor saxophone during the instrumental and the fade out of the record. The best-known version is in mono. However, a stereo rendering (with slightly different vocals) was released on the LP Atlantic History of Rhythm & Blues, Vol. 4, along with several other rare stereo versions of late 1950s Atlantic hits.

== Lyrics ==
The lyric "Who calls the English teacher 'Daddy-o'?" is most likely a reference to the 1955 film Blackboard Jungle, in which high school students mock the surname of a new teacher, Richard Dadier (Glenn Ford), changing "Dadier" to "Daddy-o", a then-current slang term (usually genial) for a male friend or a father. The term "seven come eleven" is a reference to the dice game craps, and therefore that lyric likely refers to an (in school, at least) illegal gambling session.

Leiber and Stoller have insisted that the song is unrelated to the Peanuts character of the same name.

== Personnel ==
- Mike Stoller – piano
- King Curtis – saxophone
- Adolph Jacobs, Don Arnone – guitars
- Milt Hinton – bass
- Belton Evans – drums

== The Kim Sisters version ==
"Charlie Brown"

Single by The Kim Sisters

from the album Their First Album
- A-side: "Korean Spring Song"
- Released: 1962
- Genre: Doo-wop, pop, R&B
- Length: 2:35
- Label: Monument Records
- Songwriter: Jerry Leiber and Mike Stoller
- Producers: Jerry Leiber and Mike Stoller

The Kim Sisters singles chronology
"Mister Magic Moon" / Roses in the Snow"" (1964)	"Charlie Brown" (1962)	"Bittersweet" / "Tic-A-Tic-A-Toc-Toc" (1965)

The Kim Sisters had a successful cover of the song in 1962, which peaked at number seven on the Billboard Charts.

=== Charts ===
Chart (1964)	Peak position
US Singles Chart (Billboard)	7

== Other versions ==
There have been over 80 cover versions of the song recorded, including one by British comedy actor Bernard Bresslaw and a German language version (as "Charly Brown") by Hans Blum, both in 1959. Deep River Boys with Mikkel Flagstad's orchestra recorded their spin in Oslo on August 25, 1960; it was released on the extended play En aften på "Casino Non Stop" 1960 (His Master's Voice 7EGN 36). Dr. Lonnie Smith does an extended instrumental on his live 1969 album Move Your Hand. Guy Mitchell put out a cover, and in 1995 Voodoo Glow Skulls did a ska-punk version on their album Firme. The Compton Brothers released a version in 1970, reaching number 10 in Canada and number 16 in the USA country charts.

== In popular culture ==
In a 1979 episode of The White Shadow, the Carver basketball team performs this song at a school dance. In the 1996 film Jack, the title character (played by Robin Williams) and his friends, including his teacher (played by Bill Cosby), sing it in their tree house. The weight in the tree house is so great with the kids and the two adult-sized people that it begins to creak. While they are singing, a butterfly lands on the tree house and it collapses. Once they are on the ground, Jack uses the tag line of the song and says, "Why is everybody always fallin' on me?" The song was included in the musical revue Smokey Joe's Cafe. The song was used in Jim Reardon's short Bring Me the Head of Charlie Brown (1986) which incorrectly credited the Platters.
