= Afro-desia =

Studio album by Lonnie Smith
- Released: 1975
- Recorded: 1975
- Studio: New York City, NY
- Genre: Jazz-funk
- Length: 49:12
- Label: Groove Merchant; GM 3308
- Producer: Sonny Lester

Lonnie Smith chronology
Mama Wailer (1971)	Afro-desia (1975)	Keep on Lovin' (1976)

Afro-desia is an album by American jazz organist Lonnie Smith recorded in 1975 and released on the Groove Merchant label.

== Reception ==
Professional ratings
Review scores
Source	Rating
Allmusic	2.5/5 stars

Allmusic's Jason Ankeny said: "'Afrodesia expands upon the soul-jazz sensibility of organist Lonnie Smith's classic Blue Note efforts, abandoning their hairpin-tight, diamond-sharp grooves in favor of more meditative, free-flowing epics that draw on elements of Latin jazz, pop, and even disco".

== Track listing ==
All compositions by Lonnie Smith

1. "Afrodesia" – 9:18
2. "Spirits Free" – 15:00
3. "Straight to the Point" – 6:54
4. "Flavors" – 10:00
5. "The Awakening" – 8:00 (later called "Good Morning"

note: "Flavors" is actually John Coltrane's "Impressions"

== Personnel ==
- Lonnie Smith – organ, keyboards
- Joe Lovano – tenor saxophone, soprano saxophone
- Greg Hopkins – trumpet (tracks 1–3)
- Compliments of a friend (alias George Benson) – guitar (tracks 1, 4 & 5)
- Ralphe Armstrong – electric bass (track 1)
- Ron Carter – electric bass (track 2)
- Ben Riley – drums (tracks 1–3)
- Jamey Haddad – drums, percussion (tracks 4 & 5)
