= Live at Club Mozambique =

Live at Club Mozambique may refer to the following albums recorded at Club Mozambique in Detroit, Michigan:

- Live at Club Mozambique (Lonnie Smith album), recorded in 1970 and released in 1995
- Live at Club Mozambique (Grant Green album), recorded in 1971 and released in 2006
