= Giblet Gravy =

Studio album by George Benson
- Released: 1968
- Recorded: February 1968
- Studio: A&R Recording Studios and Capitol Recording Studios, New York City
- Genre: Jazz
- Length: 56:25
- Label: Verve
- Producer: Esmond Edwards

George Benson chronology
The George Benson Cookbook (1966)	Giblet Gravy (1968)	Shape of Things to Come (1968)

Professional ratings
Review scores
Source	Rating
allmusic.com	4/5 stars
The Penguin Guide to Jazz Recordings	3/4 stars

Giblet Gravy is the fourth album by jazz/soul guitarist George Benson.

== Track listing ==
No.	Title	Writer(s)	Length
1.	"Along Comes Mary"	Tandyn Almer	3:02
2.	"Sunny"	Bobby Hebb	2:56
3.	"What's New?"	Bob Haggart, Johnny Burke	5:32
4.	"Giblet Gravy"	George Benson	4:50
5.	"Walk On By"	Burt Bacharach, Hal David	3:26
6.	"Thunder Walk"	Harold Ousley	4:42
7.	"Sack O' Woe"	Cannonball Adderley	3:08
8.	"Groovin'"	Eddie Brigati, Felix Cavaliere	2:46
9.	"Low Down and Dirty"	Benson	8:40

Bonus tracks on Polydor 2002 reissue
No.	Title	Writer(s)	Length
10.	"Billie's Bounce"	Charlie Parker	6:14
11.	"What's New?" (Take 1)	Haggart, Burke	5:41
12.	"What's New?" (Take 4)	Haggart, Burke	5:28
Total length:			56:25

== Personnel ==
=== Musicians ===
- George Benson – guitar
- Albertine Robinson, Eileen Gilbert, Lois Winter – vocals
- Eric Gale – guitar, tracks 2, 4, 5, 7
- Carl Lynch – guitar, track 1
- Herbie Hancock – piano, tracks 3, 6, 9–12
- Ron Carter – bass guitar, tracks 1, 3, 6–12
- Bob Cranshaw – bass guitar, tracks 2, 4–5
- Billy Cobham – drums
- Johnny Pacheco – congas, tambourine
- Pepper Adams – baritone saxophone, tracks 1–2, 4–5, 7–8
- Ernie Royal – trumpet, tracks 1–2, 4–5, 7–8
- Snooky Young – trumpet, tracks 1–2, 4–5, 7–8
- Jimmy Owens – trumpet, flugelhorn, tracks 1–2, 4–5, 7–8
- Alan Raph – bass trombone, tracks 1–2, 4–5, 7–8
- Tom McIntosh – arranger, conductor, tracks 1–2, 4–5, 7–8

=== Technical ===
- Esmond Edwards – producer
- Val Valentin – engineer
- Daniel Kramer – cover photography
- Acy R. Lehman – art direction
