= Keep On Lovin' =

Studio album by Lonnie Smith
- Released: 1976
- Recorded: August 1976
- Studio: Mediasound, New York City
- Genre: Jazz
- Length: 35:03
- Label: Groove Merchant; GM 3312
- Producer: Sonny Lester

Lonnie Smith chronology
Afro–desia (1975)	Keep On Lovin' (1976)	Funk Reaction (1977)

Keep On Lovin' is an album by American jazz organist Lonnie Smith recorded in 1976 and released on the Groove Merchant label.

== Reception ==
Professional ratings
Review scores
Source	Rating
Allmusic	3.5/5 stars

Allmusic's Jason Ankeny said: "Lonnie Smith embraces fusion for Keep On Lovin' , forsaking his signature Hammond B-3 for the Fender Rhodes. ... Purists will no doubt cry foul, but in truth the record's electric sheen isn't so far removed from his Blue Note heyday, and the energy and creativity of his playing demand respect regardless of context".

== Track listing ==
All compositions by Lonnie Smith except where noted

1. "Keep On Lovin'" (Jerry Friedman) – 6:00
2. "Sizzle Stick" (Brad Baker, Lance Quinn) – 5:57
3. "Lean Meat" (Baker, Quinn) – 6:16
4. "What I Want" – 5:58
5. "Filet-o-Sole" (Bob Babbitt) – 5:44
6. "No Tears Tomorrow" – 5:08

== Personnel ==
- Lonnie Smith – Fenderhodes, keyboards, vocals
- Randy Brecker, Alan Rubin – trumpet
- Barry Rogers – trombone
- David Taylor – bass trombone
- Fred Griffen – French horn
- George Young – alto saxophone, flute
- Joe Lovano – tenor saxophone
- Lew Del Gatto – baritone saxophone, flute
- Jerry Friedman, Lance Quinn – guitar, arranger
- Bob Babbitt – bass, arranger
- Will Lee – bass
- Rick Marotta – drums
- Jimmy Maelen – percussion
- Fredrick Buldrini, Guy Lumia, Harold Kohan, Jesse Levy, Joe Randazzo, Julian Barker, Norman Carr, Richard Locker, Richard Maximoff, Richard Sortomme, Tony Posk – string section
