= Drives (album) =

Studio album by Lonnie Smith
- Released: 1970
- Recorded: January 2, 1970
- Studio: Van Gelder Studio, Englewood Cliffs, New Jersey
- Genre: Jazz
- Length: 35:46
- Label: Blue Note
- Producer: Francis Wolff

Lonnie Smith chronology
Move Your Hand (1969)	Drives (1970)	Live at Club Mozambique (1970)

Drives is an album by American organist Lonnie Smith recorded in 1970 and released on the Blue Note label.

== Reception ==
The Allmusic review by Ron Wynn awarded the album 4 stars and stated "Lonnie Smith had the raw skills, imagination, and versatility to play burning originals, bluesy covers of R&B and pop, or skillful adaptations of conventional jazz pieces and show tunes. Why he never established himself as a consistent performer remains a mystery, but this 1970 reissue shows why he excited so many people during his rise".

Professional ratings
Review scores
Source	Rating
Allmusic	4/5 stars

== Track listing ==
All compositions by Lonnie Smith except as indicated

1. "Twenty-Five Miles" (Bristol, Fuqua, Starr) - 5:36
2. "Spinning Wheel" (David Clayton-Thomas) - 7:30
3. "Seven Steps to Heaven" (Miles Davis, Victor Feldman) - 5:43
4. "Psychedelic Pi" - 6:30
5. "Who's Afraid of Virginia Woolf?" (Don Kirkpatrick, Keith Knox) - 10:46
- Recorded at Rudy Van Gelder Studio, Englewood Cliffs, New Jersey on January 2, 1970

== Personnel ==
- Lonnie Smith - organ
- Dave Hubbard - tenor saxophone
- Ronnie Cuber - baritone saxophone
- Larry McGee - guitar
- Joe Dukes - drums

== Uses in other media ==
Alternative hip-hop group A Tribe Called Quest sampled Smith's cover of "Spinning Wheel" in their 1990 song "Can I Kick It?".
