= The 5.6.7.8's Can't Help It! =

Compilation album by The 5.6.7.8's
- Released: March 26, 1991
- Recorded: 1986–1991
- Genre: Garage punk
- Length: 41:19
- Label: Au Go Go (AU); Rockville (USA)

The 5.6.7.8's chronology
The 5.6.7.8's Can't Help It! (1991)	The 5.6.7.8's (1994)

The 5.6.7.8's Can't Help It! is a compilation album by The 5.6.7.8's which was released 1991 in Australia (Au Go Go Records) and the United States (Rockville Records).

== Track listing ==
1. "Ah-So"
2. "Let's Have a Party"
3. "Pinball Party"
4. "Jet Coaster"
5. "Wooly Bully"
6. "Wild Thing"
7. "Bond Girl"
8. "Motor Cycle Go-Go!"
9. "Fruit Bubble Love"
10. "The 5.6.7.8's"
11. "Woo Eee"
12. "Edie Is a Sweet Candy"
13. "I Was a Teenage Cave Woman"
14. "Blue Radio"
