= Think! (Lonnie Smith album) =

Studio album by Lonnie Smith
- Released: 1968
- Recorded: July 23, 1968
- Studio: A&R Recording, NYC
- Genre: Jazz
- Length: 42:53
- Label: Blue Note; BST 84290
- Producer: Francis Wolff

Lonnie Smith chronology
Finger-Lickin' Good (1967)	Think! (1968)	Turning Point (1969)

Think! is the second album by American organist Lonnie Smith recorded in 1968 and released on the Blue Note label.

== Reception ==
The Allmusic review by Matt Collar awarded the album 4½ stars and stated "Think!, organist Lonnie Smith's 1968 release for Blue Note, is easily one of the strongest dates the Hammond B-3 master would produce for the label".

Professional ratings
Review scores
Source	Rating
Allmusic	4.5/5 stars
The Penguin Guide to Jazz Recordings	3/4 stars

== Track listing ==
All compositions by Lonnie Smith except as noted

1. "Son of Ice Bag" (Hugh Masekela) - 11:15
2. "The Call of the Wild" - 12:31
3. "Think" (Aretha Franklin, Ted White) - 4:46
4. "Three Blind Mice" (Traditional) - 6:29
5. "Slouchin'" - 6:52

== Personnel ==
- Lonnie Smith - organ
- Lee Morgan - trumpet
- David Newman - tenor saxophone, flute
- Melvin Sparks - guitar
- Marion Booker Jr. - drums
- Norberto Apellaniz, Willie Bivens - conga (tracks 2 & 5)
- Henry "Pucho" Brown - timbales (tracks 2 & 5)
