= Ronnie Cuber =

Jazz saxophonist (1941–2022)

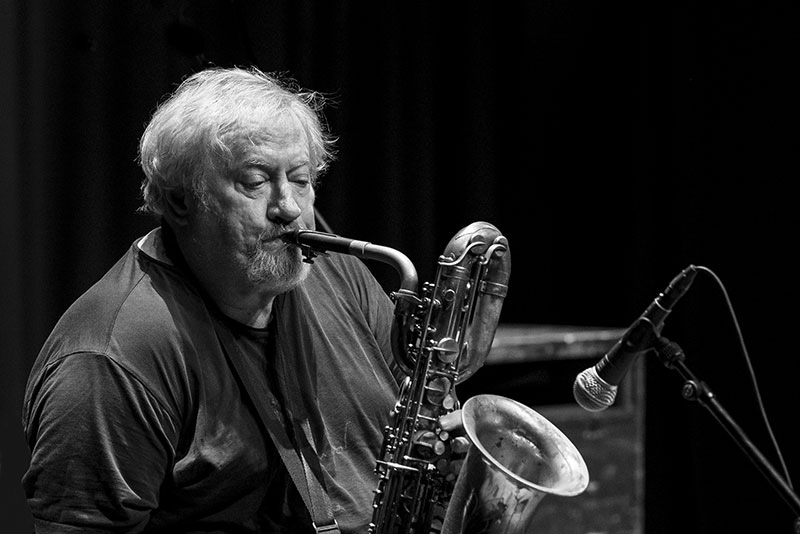
- Ronnie Cuber in Aarhus, Denmark (2017)

Background information
- Born: Ronald Edward Cuber; December 25, 1941; Brooklyn, New York, U.S.
- Died: October 7, 2022 (aged 80) New York, New York, U.S.
- Genre: Jazz
- Occupation: Musician
- Instrument: Saxophone
- Years active: 1959–2022
- Labels: Projazz, SteepleChase
- Formerly of: Mingus Big Band, George Benson, Fuse One, Players Association

Ronald Edward Cuber (December 25, 1941 – October 7, 2022) was an American jazz saxophonist. He also played in Latin, pop, rock, and blues sessions. In addition to his primary instrument, baritone sax, he played tenor sax, soprano sax, clarinet, and flute, the latter on an album by Eddie Palmieri as well as on his own recordings. As a leader, Cuber was known for hard bop and Latin jazz. As a side man, he had played with B. B. King, Paul Simon, and Eric Clapton. Cuber can be heard on Freeze Frame by the J. Geils Band, and one of his most spirited performances is on Dr. Lonnie Smith's 1970 Blue Note album Drives. He was also a member of the Saturday Night Live Band.

Cuber was in Marshall Brown's Newport Youth Band in 1959, where he switched from tenor to baritone sax. His first notable work was with Slide Hampton (1962) and Maynard Ferguson (1963–1965). Then from 1966 to 1967, Cuber worked with George Benson. He was also a member of the Lee Konitz nonet from 1977 to 1979.

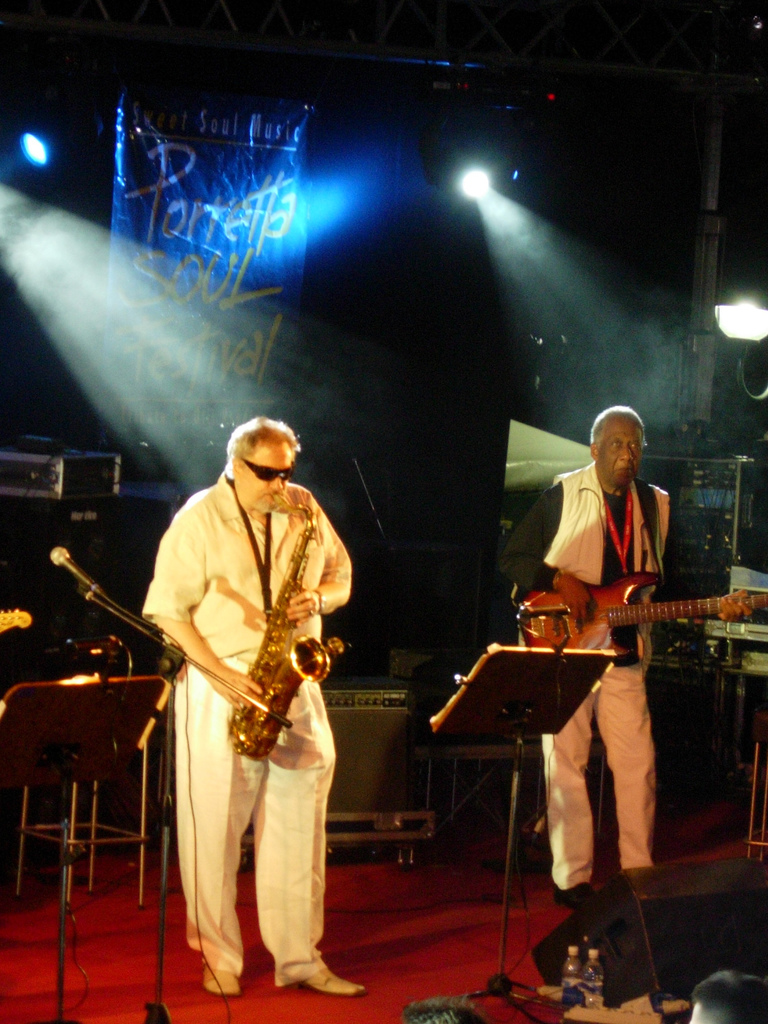
Ronnie Cuber (left) and Chuck Rainey at the Porretta Soul Festival, 2005

Cuber played with Frank Zappa on the live album Zappa in New York, which was recorded in 1976. He was a member of the Mingus Big Band from its inception in the early 1990s until his death. As a member of the Mingus Big Band, Cuber plays the iconic solo on Moanin' by Charles Mingus, found originally on Mingus' album Blues & Roots, in the Mingus Big Band album Nostalgia in Times Square. He was an off-screen musician for the movie Across the Universe.

Cuber died at the age of 80 in his studio on New York's Upper West Side, due to complications from a fall.

== Discography ==
=== As leader ===
- 1976 Cuber Libre! (Xanadu)
- 1978 The Eleventh Day of Aquarius (Xanadu)
- 1979 New York Jazz (as part of Rein De Graaff Quintet) (Timeless)
- 1985 Two Brothers (AMG)
- 1985 Passion Fruit (Electric Bird/PID)
- 1986 Pin Point (Electric Bird/PID)
- 1986 Live at the Blue Note (ProJazz) – live
- 1992 Airplay (SteepleChase)
- 1992 Cubism (Fresh Sound)
- 1993 The Scene Is Clean (Milestone)
- 1994 The Scene Is Clean (Milestone)
- 1996 In a New York Minute (SteepleChase)
- 1997 N.Y.C.ats (SteepleChase)
- 1998 Love for Sale (with the Netherlands Metropole Orchestra) (Koch)
- 2009 Ronnie (SteepleChase)
- 2009 X-Mas in New York (Syn)
- 2010 Infra-Rae (Maxanter)
- 2011 Boplicity (SteepleChase)
- 2013 Live at JazzFest Berlin (SteepleChase) – live rec. 2008
- 2018 Ronnie's Trio (SteepleChase)
- 2018 Ronnie Cuber - Live At Montmartre (Storyville) – live
- 2019 Four (SteepleChase)
- 2019 Straight Street (SteepleChase)

=== As sideman ===
With Patti Austin

- End of a Rainbow (CTI, 1976)
- Havana Candy (CTI, 1977)

With George Benson

- It's Uptown (Columbia, 1966)
- The George Benson Cookbook (Columbia, 1966)
- Good King Bad (CTI, 1975)

With Dr. John

- Trippin' Live (1997)
- Duke Elegant (Parlophone, 1999)

With Maynard Ferguson

- The New Sounds of Maynard Ferguson (Cameo, 1963)
- Come Blow Your Horn (Cameo, 1963)
- Color Him Wild (Mainstream, 1965)

With The Gadd Gang

- The Gadd Gang (Columbia, 1986)
- Here & Now (Columbia, 1988)
- Live at the Bottom Line (A Touch, 1994)

With Billy Joel

- An Innocent Man (Columbia, 1983)
- The Bridge (Columbia, 1986)

With Lee Konitz

- Lee Konitz Nonet (Chiaroscuro, 1977)
- Yes, Yes, Nonet (SteepleChase, 1979)
- Live at Laren (Soul Note, 1984) – rec. 1979

With Jimmy McGriff

- Feelin' It (Milestone, 2001)
- McGriff Avenue (Milestone, 2002)

With Idris Muhammad

- House of the Rising Sun (Kudu, 1976)
- Turn This Mutha Out (Kudu, 1977)

With Eddie Palmieri

- Harlem River Drive (Roulette, 1971)
- Vamonos Pa'l Monte (Tico, 1971)
- Live at Sing Sing Vol. 1 & 2 (Tico, 1972)
- The Sun of Latin Music (Coco, 1975)
- Unfinished Masterpiece (Coco, 1976)
- Lucumí, Macumba, Voodoo (Epic, 1978)
- Wisdom/Sabiduria (Ropeadope, 2017)

With Lonnie Smith

- Move Your Hand (Blue Note, 1969)
- Drives (Blue Note, 1970)
- Live at Club Mozambique (Blue Note, 1995) – live rec. 1970

With others

- Nick Brignola, Burn Brigade (Bee Hive, 1979)
- David Clayton-Thomas, David Clayton-Thomas (Columbia, 1972)
- Grant Green, The Main Attraction (Kudu, 1976)
- Sam Jones, Something New (Interplay, 1979)
- Mark Murphy, Satisfaction Guaranteed (Muse, 1980)
- Horace Silver, The Hardbop Grandpop (1996)
- Mickey Tucker, Sojourn (Xanadu, 1977)
- Gerald Wilson, Detroit (Mack Avenue, 2009)
- Rare Silk, New Weave (1986)
- Randy Brecker, 34th N Lex (2003)
- Paul Simon, Graceland (1986)
- Tom Scott, Bebop United (2006)
- The Rein De Graaff Trio, Baritone Explosion! - Live At Nick's (Timeless, 1995)
- Steve Gadd, Center Stage (Leopard, 2022)
- Steely Dan, Gaucho (MCA Records, 1980)
- Conrad Herwig, The Latin Side of Wayne Shorter (Half Note Records, 2008)
- Gary Smulyan, Tough Baritones (Steeplechase, 2021)
