= Teenage Mojo Workout =

Album by the 5.6.7.8's

Studio album by The 5.6.7.8's
- Released: 2002
- Recorded: Peace Music In Tokyo
- Length: 32:51
- Label: Time Bomb
- Producer: The 5.6.7.8's

The 5.6.7.8's chronology
| Pin Heel Stomp (1997) | Teenage Mojo Workout (2002) | Bomb the Rocks: Early Days Singles (2003) |

Teenage Mojo Workout is the second studio album by the Japanese rock band the 5.6.7.8's. It was released in 2002 on the record label Time Bomb.

== Track listing ==
Side one
| No. | Title | Writer(s) | Length |
|---|---|---|---|
| 1. | "(I'm Sorry Mama) I'm a Wild One" | Umekawa Umekawa | 2:23 |
| 2. | "I'm Blue" | Ike Turner | 2:31 |
| 3. | "Road Runner" | Umekawa | 2:09 |
| 4. | "I Got a Man" | Sandy Linzer, Denny Randell | 2:51 |
| 5. | "Typhoon Girl" | The 5.6.7.8's | 3:03 |
| 6. | "Hanky Panky" | Jeff Barry, Ellie Greenwich | 3:04 |
| Total length: | | | 16:01 |

Side two
| No. | Title | Writer(s) | Length |
|---|---|---|---|
| 1. | "Harlem Shuffle" | Bob Relf, Earl Nelson | 2:23 |
| 2. | "Green Onions" | Booker T. Jones, Steve Cropper, Lewie Steinberg, Al Jackson Jr. | 3:06 |
| 3. | "In the Subway" | Umekawa Umekawa | 3:21 |
| 4. | "Teenage Mojo Workout" | The 5.6.7.8's | 2:52 |
| 5. | "Let's Go Boogaloo" | Hiroto Sasaki, Takeshi Terauchi | 2:28 |
| 6. | "New Orleans Rock" | The 5.6.7.8's | 2:40 |
| Total length: | | | 16:50 |
