= Pin Heel Stomp =

EP by The 5.6.7.8's
- Released: November 30, 1997
- Genre: Rockabilly
- Label: Time Bomb

The 5.6.7.8's chronology
Bomb the Twist (1996)	Pin Heel Stomp (1997)	Teenage Mojo Workout (2002)

Professional ratings
Review scores
Source	Rating
Allmusic	2.5/5 stars

Pin Heel Stomp is an EP that was released November 30, 1997 by The 5.6.7.8's. "The Barracuda" is featured in The Fast and the Furious: Tokyo Drift Soundtrack.

== Track listing ==
1. "Pin Heel Stomp"
2. "Dance in the Avenue A"
3. "Arkansas Twists"
4. "Hey! Mashed Potato, Hey!"
5. "Spell Stroll"
6. "The Barracuda"
