= Turning Point (Lonnie Smith album) =

Studio album by Lonnie Smith
- Released: 1969
- Recorded: January 3, 1969
- Studio: Van Gelder Studio, Englewood Cliffs, New Jersey
- Genre: Jazz
- Length: 36:31
- Label: Blue Note
- Producer: Francis Wolff

Lonnie Smith chronology
Think! (1968)	Turning Point (1969)	Move Your Hand (1969)

Turning Point is the second album by American organist Lonnie Smith recorded in 1969 and released on the Blue Note label.

== Reception ==
The Allmusic review by Stephen Thomas Erlewine awarded the album 3 stars and stated "While the more adventurous elements of Turning Point make for an intriguing listen, the album isn't quite as enjoyable as the harder grooving sessions or the spacier soul-jazz records from the same era. Nevertheless, it's a worthwhile listen".

Professional ratings
Review scores
Source	Rating
Allmusic	3/5 stars
The Penguin Guide to Jazz Recordings	3/4 stars

== Track listing ==
All compositions by Lonnie Smith except as indicated

1. "See Saw" (Don Covay, Steve Cropper) - 5:54
2. "Slow High" - 6:31
3. "People Sure Act Funny" (Bobby Robinson, Titus Turner) - 6:25
4. "Eleanor Rigby" (John Lennon, Paul McCartney) - 9:18
5. "Turning Point" - 8:23

- Recorded at Rudy Van Gelder Studio, Englewood Cliffs, New Jersey on January 3, 1969

== Personnel ==
- Lonnie Smith - organ
- Lee Morgan - trumpet (tracks 1, 2, 4 & 5)
- Bennie Maupin - tenor saxophone (tracks 1, 2, 4 & 5)
- Julian Priester - trombone (tracks 1, 2, 4 & 5)
- Melvin Sparks - guitar
- Idris Muhammad - drums
