= The 5.6.7.8's (album) =

Studio album by The 5.6.7.8's
- Released: 1994
- Recorded: Jam Studio (Shinjuku, Tokyo)
- Genre: Garage rock; rockabilly
- Length: 35:09
- Label: Time Bomb
- Producer: The 5.6.7.8's

The 5.6.7.8's chronology
The 5.6.7.8's Can't Help It! (1993)	The 5.6.7.8's (1994)	Bomb the Twist (1996)

Professional ratings
Review scores
Source	Rating
AllMusic	4/5 stars

The 5.6.7.8's is a 1994 studio album by the Japanese rock band the 5.6.7.8's. It includes "I Walk Like Jayne Mansfield", one of three songs by the band heard in the 2003 film Kill Bill: Volume 1.

== Track listing ==
All tracks are written by the 5.6.7.8's, except where noted

Side one
No.	Title	Writer(s)	Length
1.	"Harlem Nocturne"	Earle Hagen, Dick Rogers	1:19
2.	"Oriental Rock"		2:28
3.	"I Walk Like Jayne Mansfield"		3:48
4.	"Arkansas Twist"		2:22
5.	"Handsome Man"		2:35
6.	"Rockin' Rochester"		2:18
7.	"One Potato"		1:55
Total length:			16:45

Side two
No.	Title	Writer(s)	Length
1.	"Long Tall Sally"	Enotris Johnson, Richard Penniman, Robert Blackwell	2:57
2.	"Cat Fight Run"		2:19
3.	"I Don't Need You No More"		2:11
4.	"Highschool Witch"		2:57
5.	"Teenage Cleopatra"		3:26
6.	"Tallahassee Lassie"	Bob Crewe, Frank Slay, Frederick Picariello	2:29
7.	"Scream"	Ralph Nielsen	2:05
Total length:			18:24

== Reception ==
Karen E. Graves of AllMusic gave the album a score of four out of five stars, writing that, "the group's carefree sound and merry mangling of English are infectiously fun for those who like their rock & roll to be a little bit more bubblegum, favoring style over substance."
