= The Compton Brothers =

American musical duo

- Origin: St. Louis, Missouri
- Genre: Country
- Years active: 1965–1975
- Labels: Columbia, Dot
- Past members: Bill Compton; Harry Compton

The Compton Brothers was a duo consisting of brothers Bill and Harry Compton. The group won a talent contest in 1965 sponsored by Columbia Records. Between 1966 and 1975, they recorded for Dot Records, charting in the top 20 of the Hot Country Songs charts with covers of Jumpin' Gene Simmons' "Haunted House" and The Coasters' "Charlie Brown". The band released three albums for Dot.

== Discography ==
=== Albums ===
Title	Album details	Peak positions
Title	Album details	US Country
Off The Top Of The Compton Brothers	Release date: 1968; Label: Dot Records; Format: LP	—
Haunted House/Charlie Brown	Release date: 1970; Label: Dot Records; Format: LP	28
Yellow River	Release date: 1972; Label: Dot Records; Format: LP	—

=== Singles ===
Year	Single	Peak chart positions	
Year	Single	US Country	CAN Country
1965	"Still Away"	—	—
1966	"Country Music"	—	—
1966	"Pickin' Up the Mail"	61	—
1967	"If It's All the Same to You"	—	—
1968	"Honey"	64	—
1968	"Two Little Hearts"	75	—
1968	"Everybody Needs Somebody"	62	—
1969	"Step Up Walk With Me"	23	—
1969	"Haunted House"	11	3
1970	"Charlie Brown"	16	10
1970	"That Ain't No Stuff"	61	—
1970	"Nadine"	—	—
1971	"Pine Grove"	65	—
1971	"May Old Acquaintance Be Forgot (Before I Lose My Mind)"	62	—
1972	"Yellow River"	49	—
1972	"Claudette"	41	—
1973	"Some of Shelly's Blues"	—	—
1973	"California Blues (Blue Yodel No. 4)"	65	—
1974	"Secret Memories"	—	—
1975	"Cat's in the Cradle"	97	—
1975	"My Music"	95	—
