= Mama Wailer =

Studio album by Lonnie Smith
- Released: 1971
- Recorded: July 14 & 15, 1971
- Studio: Van Gelder Studio, Englewood Cliffs, NJ
- Genre: Jazz
- Length: 35:25
- Label: Kudu; KU-02
- Producer: Creed Taylor

Lonnie Smith chronology
Live at Club Mozambique (1970)	Mama Wailer (1971)	Afro–desia (1975)

Mama Wailer is an album by American jazz organist Lonnie Smith recorded in 1971 and released on the Kudu label.

== Reception ==
Professional ratings
Review scores
Source	Rating
Allmusic	4/5 stars

Allmusic's Thom Jurek said: "Mama Wailer is one of the quintessential sides issued by Creed Taylor's CTI/Kudu imprint ... This is what Latin soul is all about when it meets jazz. The improvisations are in the pocket, but, at the same time, off the page. Here is where boogaloo and hard bop meet headlong".

== Track listing ==
All compositions by Lonnie Smith except where noted

1. "Mama Wailer" – 6:20
2. "Hola Muneca" – 6:32
3. "I Feel the Earth Move" (Carole King) – 5:06
4. "Stand" (Sylvester Stewart) – 17:27

== Personnel ==
- Lonnie Smith – organ, clavinet, vocals
- Danny Moore – trumpet, flugelhorn
- Grover Washington Jr. – flute, tenor saxophone, arranger
- Dave Hubbard – tenor saxophone
- Marvin Cabell – tenor saxophone
- George Davis – guitar
- Jimmy Ponder – guitar
- Robert Lowe – guitar (track 1)
- Ron Carter – bass, electric bass (tracks 1, 2 & 4)
- Chuck Rainey – bass, electric bass (track 3)
- Billy Cobham – drums
- William King, Airto Moreira, Richard Pratt – percussion
