= Live at Club Mozambique (Lonnie Smith album) =

Live album by Lonnie Smith
- Released: 1995
- Recorded: May 21, 1970
- Venue: Club Mozambique, Detroit, MI
- Genre: Jazz
- Length: 73:34
- Label: Blue Note
- Producer: Francis Wolff

Lonnie Smith chronology
Drives (1970)	Live at Club Mozambique (1995)	Mama Wailer (1971)

Live at Club Mozambique is a live album by American organist Lonnie Smith recorded in Detroit in 1970 and released on the Blue Note label in 1995.

== Reception ==
Professional ratings
Review scores
Source	Rating
Allmusic	4.5/5 stars

Allmusic's Richie Unterberger said: "It's odd that Blue Note decided to sit on it for so long, because it ranks as one of Lonnie's better sets. The band, featuring George Benson on guitar, is relaxed and funky without being in your face about it, and unlike much soul-jazz of the time, most of the material is original, Smith having penned six of the eight numbers. Although the riffs often owe a lot to James Brown, this is definitely at least as much jazz as soul".

== Track listing ==
All compositions by Lonnie Smith except where noted

1. "I Can't Stand It" (James Brown)^{uncredited} – 8:24
2. "Expressions" – 11:30
3. "Scream" – 9:47
4. "Play It Back" – 9:35
5. "Love Bowl" – 9:43
6. "Peace of Mind" – 7:38
7. "I Want to Thank You" (Sly Stone) – 9:51
8. "Seven Steps to Heaven" (Victor Feldman, Miles Davis) – 7:06

== Personnel ==
- Lonnie Smith – organ, vocals
- Dave Hubbard – tenor saxophone
- Ronnie Cuber – baritone saxophone
- George Benson – guitar
- Joe Dukes – drums
- Clifford Mack – tambourine
