= Bobby J. Brown =

American actor (1963–2026)

- Born: 1963; Washington, D.C., U.S.
- Died: February 25, 2026 (aged 62); Chaptico, Maryland, U.S.
- Occupation: Actor

Bobby J. Brown (1963 – February 25, 2026) was an American character actor known for his work on the series The Wire and the miniseries We Own This City. He was born and raised in Washington, D.C.. He died of smoke inhalation from a barn fire at his home in Chaptico, Maryland, on February 25, 2026, at the age of 62. According to the Maryland Office of the Chief Medical Examiner, his death was an accident.

== Filmography ==
=== Film ===
Year	Title	Role	Notes
1998	Pecker	Average Joe	
2001	Love the Hard Way	Man in Video Arcade	
2002	City by the Sea	Uniform Cop	Uncredited
2008	From Within	Officer Dan	
2009	My One and Only	Diner Man	
2019	Miss Virginia	Police Officer	
2020	Really Love	Officer	

=== Television ===
Year	Title	Role	Notes
1998	Homicide: Life on the Street	Terry	Episode: "Closet Cases"
2000	The Corner	Officer Ira Weiner	3 episodes
2002	The Pennsylvania Miners' Story	Driller #3	TV film
2002–2008	The Wire	Officer Bobby Brown	12 episodes
2012	Veep	Crazy Long Shoreman	Episode: "Chung"
2022	We Own This City	Thomas Allers	4 episodes
