= Three Cool Cats =

Single by The Coasters
- A-side: "Charlie Brown"
- Released: January 1959
- Recorded: March 17, 1958
- Genre: R&B
- Length: 2:08
- Label: Atco 45-6132
- Songwriter(s): Jerry Leiber and Mike Stoller

"Three Cool Cats" is a 1958 song written by Jerry Leiber and Mike Stoller. It was originally recorded by the Coasters and released as the B-side of their hit single, "Charlie Brown".

"Three Cool Cats" was one of the fifteen songs recorded by the Beatles for their Decca Records audition on New Year's Day in 1962 in London. The Beatles' cover version featured George Harrison's vocals and Pete Best on drums. The Beatles' manager, Brian Epstein, personally chose this and the fourteen other audition numbers from the band's Merseyside dance hall and rock club repertoire. The recording was included on the Beatles' Anthology 1. The group also performed this song several times during the Get Back/Let It Be sessions of January 1969. None of these have ever been officially released by EMI.

Many other covers of this song have been recorded. Richard Anthony recorded it in French as "Nouvelle vague" (1958). It appears on the 2005 Ry Cooder album Chávez Ravine, with vocals performed by Little Willie G (Willie Garcia). Japanese Garage rock band the 5.6.7.8's covered the song (with the title modified as "Three Cool Chicks") for their 1996 EP Bomb the Twist. It is also featured on Stand Out/Fit In, the 2007 studio album by the Basics, as well as on their 2010 live album. The song is also heard in the 2016 film Nine Lives.
