= Move Your Hand =

Live album by Lonnie Smith
- Released: 1969
- Recorded: August 9, 1969
- Venue: Club Harlem in Atlantic City, New Jersey
- Genre: Jazz-funk
- Length: 37:35
- Label: Blue Note
- Producer: Francis Wolff

Lonnie Smith chronology
Turning Point (1969)	Move Your Hand (1969)	Drives (1970)

Move Your Hand is a live album by American organist Lonnie Smith recorded at Club Harlem in Atlantic City, New Jersey in 1969 and released on the Blue Note label.

== Reception ==
The Allmusic review by Stephen Thomas Erlewine awarded the album 4 stars and stated "Move Your Hand is thoroughly enjoyable, primarily because the group never lets their momentum sag throughout the session. Though the sound of the record might be somewhat dated, the essential funk of the album remains vital".

Professional ratings
Review scores
Source	Rating
Allmusic	4/5 stars

== Track listing ==
All compositions by Lonnie Smith except as indicated

1. "Charlie Brown" (Jerry Leiber, Mike Stoller) – 8:26
2. "Layin' in the Cut" – 10:11
3. "Move Your Hand" – 9:01
4. "Sunshine Superman" (Donovan Leitch) – 10:16
5. "Dancin' in an Easy Groove" – 11:56

- Recorded at Club Harlem in Atlantic City, New Jersey on August 9, 1969

== Personnel ==
- Lonnie Smith – organ, vocals
- Rudy Jones – tenor saxophone
- Ronnie Cuber – baritone saxophone
- Larry McGee – guitar
- Sylvester Goshay – drums
