= The Kim Sisters =

Korean-born American singing trio

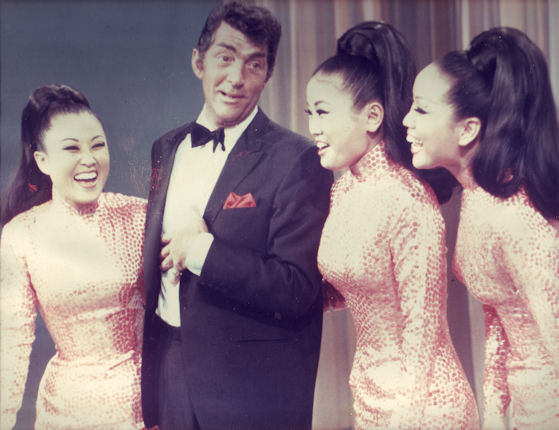
- The Kim Sisters with Dean Martin

Background information
- Origin: South Korea
- Genre: Pop
- Occupation: Singers
- Years active: 1953–1975
- Labels: Monument; L.K.L.; Shin Jin; Oasis
- Past members: Kim Sook-ja (Sue); Kim Ai-ja (Aija); Kim Min-ja (Mia)

The Kim Sisters (Korean: 김시스터즈) were a female vocal group from South Korea. The trio consisted of Sook-ja "Sue", Ai-ja "Aija", and Min-ja "Mia" Kim. They primarily made their career in the United States during the 1950s and 1960s. Formed in 1953, they are known for being the first Korean music group to achieve success in the U.S. market during the 1960s, and for performing more than 20 times on The Ed Sullivan Show.

== Early lives ==
Sue (Korean: 김숙자; RR: Gim Sukja; MR: Kim Sukcha) and Aija (Korean: 김애자; RR: Gim Aeja; MR: Kim Aecha) were born in Seoul. They were the daughters of Kim Hae-song, a popular conductor, and Lee Nan-young, one of Korea's most famous singers before the Korean War, best known for her song, "Tears of Mokpo." The elder Kim died in 1950 during the Korean War.

Mia (Korean: 김민자; RR: Gim Minja; MR: Kim Mincha) was Sue and Aija's biological cousin whose father was Lee Bong-ryong, a musician and Lee Nan-young's elder brother; she was later adopted by Lee Nan-young.

== Career ==
=== Beginnings ===
The Kim Sisters were formed in 1953. Following her husband's execution by North Korean forces during the Korean War, Lee Nan-young had her adopted niece Mia and her biological daughters Sue and Aija form a singing group to support the family. Lee bought American records on the black market so that the girls could learn songs like Hoagy Carmichael's "Ole Buttermilk Sky," which they performed in bars and nightclubs for American soldiers stationed in South Korea during the Korean War.

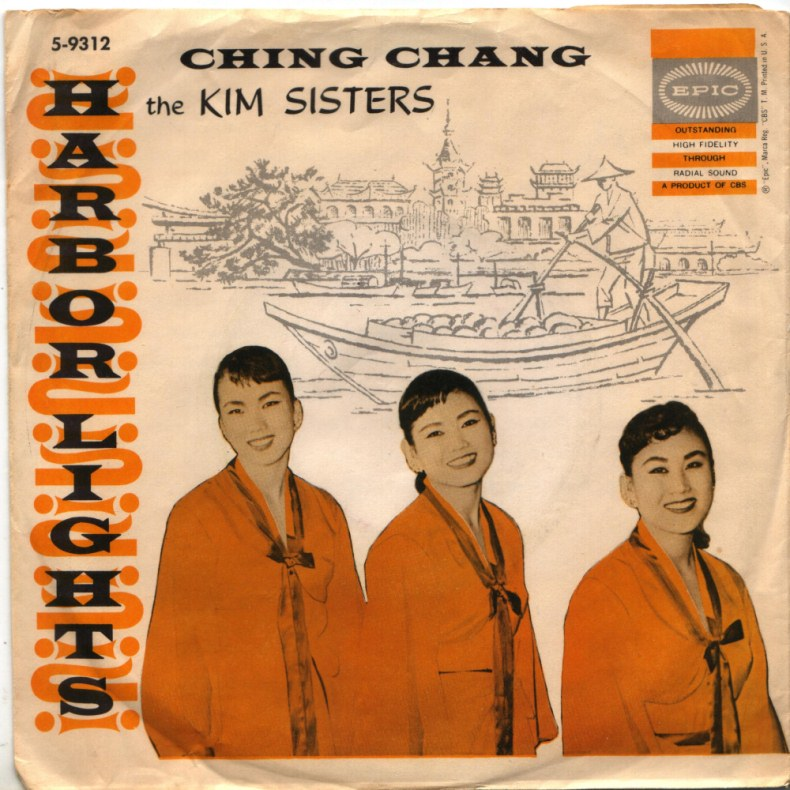
Harbor Lights/Ching Chang, the first Kim Sisters record from 1959.

The Kim Sisters were popular among the American troops, who spread the word about the group to American entertainment producer Tom Ball, drafting a letter with 30 GI signatures. He flew to South Korea in 1958 to hear the group perform, and The Kim Sisters signed a contract with Ball soon after. However, it took them nearly a year to acquire visas to go to the United States.

=== Fame in the United States ===
In 1959, The Kim Sisters arrived in Las Vegas to perform in Ball's "China Doll Revue" at the Thunderbird Hotel. After they fulfilled their contract at the Thunderbird, The Kim Sisters began performing at the Stardust Hotel. It was during this time that they were first invited to perform on The Ed Sullivan Show, the GI's original goal. It was also at this first performance they met Louis Armstrong. They ultimately performed on the show an additional 21 times. They made a guest appearance on the Dean Jones Ensign O'Toole sitcom, "Operation Benefit" October 14, 1962. The Kim Sisters frequently performed wearing Korean hanbok and singing popular American songs.

In 1962, they covered The Coasters song "Charlie Brown". Their mother Nan-young then sent their three brothers to join their sisters and form the "Kim Brothers" group. They toured with their sisters but did not have their own breakout.

=== Split ===
Sue and Mia had a falling out around 1973, and Mia left the group, marking the end of the main Kim Sisters act. Sue and Aija continued performing together in Las Vegas until Aija died of lung cancer in 1987.

Mia moved to Hungary with her husband, musician Tommy Vig, with whom she performs and produces records. She has not maintained contact with her brothers and Sue. Sue stayed in Nevada where she married and raised two children. In an interview with Vanity Fair, she mentioned she had never seen footage of the Kim Sisters performing together prior to clips being uploaded to YouTube.

On March 27, 2014, Sue Kim became the first Korean American to be inducted into the Nevada Entertainer/Artist Hall of Fame.

== Discography ==
=== Studio albums ===
Title	Album details
Their First Album	Released: 1959; Region: United States; Label: Monument Records; Format: LP record
푸레젠트	Released: 1969; Region: South Korea; Label: L.K.L. Records; Format: LP record
어머니를 추모한 김시스터즈 가요집	Released: 1970; Region: South Korea; Label: Shin Jin; Format: LP record
This Is My Life	Released: 1975; Region: South Korea; Label: Oasis Records; Format: LP record

=== U.S. singles ===
Title	Single details	Peak chart positions
Title	Single details	US Singles
"Harbor Lights" "Ching Chang"	Released: 1959; Label: Epic Records; Format: 7-inch	—
"A Diamond Is Forever" "Now Is the Hour"	Released: 1961; Label: Mercury Records; Format: 7-inch	—
"Love Star" "You Can't Have Everything (They Say)"	Released: 1963; Label: Monument Records; Format: 7-inch	—
"Blueberry Pie" "We're Going Back Together"	Released: 1963; Label: Monument Records; Format: 7-inch	—
"Mister Magic Moon" "Roses in the Snow"	Released: 1964; Label: Monument Records; Format: 7-inch	—
"Charlie Brown" "Korean Spring Song"	Released: 1964; Label: Monument Records; Format: 7-inch	7
"Bittersweet" "Tic-A-Tic-A-Toc-Toc"	Released: 1965; Label: Monument Records; Format: 7-inch	—
"No Sad Songs for Me" "Just Like Taking Candy from a Baby"	Released: 1966; Label: Monument Records; Format: 7-inch	—

== See also ==
- Korean Kittens
