= The George Benson Cookbook =

Studio album by George Benson
- Released: 1967
- Recorded: August 1 – October 19, 1966
- Genre: Jazz
- Length: 40:50
- Label: Columbia
- Producer: John Hammond

George Benson chronology
It's Uptown (1966)	The George Benson Cookbook (1967)	Giblet Gravy (1968)

Singles from The George Benson Cookbook
- 1. "The Borgia Stick" Released: 1966

Professional ratings
Review scores
Source	Rating
Allmusic	3/5 stars
The Rolling Stone Jazz Record Guide	3/5 stars
The Penguin Guide to Jazz Recordings	3.5/4 stars

The George Benson Cookbook is the third studio album by jazz/soul guitarist George Benson, and the second to be produced by John Hammond.

== Background ==
The Hard Bop Homepage says of the album, "This is basically the George Benson quartet, with Smith and Cuber, but trombonist Bennie Green and percussionist Pucho were added on some tracks, giving them a bop flavor that delighted dedicated jazz fans and critics. Benson's quartet was modeled after Jack McDuff's—with baritone saxophonist Ronnie Cuber, organist Lonnie Smith, a powerhouse player who deserved more attention than he ever received, and Jimmy Lovelace or Marion Booker on drums. The sonorous tone of Cuber's baritone gives the quartet a richer, more dense texture than that obtained by McDuff, who used a tenor, but the overall sound is the same. At twenty-five, Ronnie Cuber was an alumnus of Marshall Brown's celebrated Newport Youth Band; he had spent the previous two years with Maynard Ferguson's very loud and brassy orchestra, which may account for his aggressive style, but Cuber's approach also emphasized rhythm, and that was precisely the ingredient called for by a "soul jazz" group of this kind."

== Track listing ==
All tracks composed by George Benson; except where indicated

No.	Title	Writer(s)	Length
1.	"The Cooker"		4:18
2.	"Benny's Back"		4:10
3.	"Bossa Rocka"		4:20
4.	"All of Me"	Gerald Marks, Seymour Simons	2:08
5.	"Big Fat Lady"		4:40
6.	"Benson's Rider"		5:30
7.	"Ready and Able"	Jimmy Smith	3:32
8.	"The Borgia Stick"		3:05
9.	"Return of the Prodigal Son"	Harold Ousley	2:34
10.	"Jumpin' with Symphony Sid"	Lester Young	6:33
Total length:			40:50

=== 2007 remastered CD / Blu-spec CD bonus tracks ===
No.	Title	Length
11.	"The Man from Toledo"	2:08
12.	"Slow Scene"	3:11
13.	"Let Them Talk"	2:51
14.	"Goodnight"	2:21
Total length:		50:31

== Personnel ==
The George Benson Quartet

- George Benson – guitar; vocals on "All of Me"
- Ronnie Cuber – baritone saxophone
- Bennie Green – trombone
- Lonnie Smith – organ
- Albert Winston – bass
- Paul H. Brown – bass (uncredited on album)
- Jimmy Lovelace – drums
- Marion Booker, Jr. – drums
