= It's Uptown =

Studio album by George Benson
- Released: 1966
- Recorded: February–March 1966
- Genre: Jazz
- Length: 41:49
- Label: Columbia
- Producer: John Hammond

George Benson chronology
The New Boss Guitar of George Benson (1964)	It's Uptown (1966)	The George Benson Cookbook (1967)

Singles from It's Uptown
- 1. "Ain't That Peculiar" Released: 1966

Professional ratings
Review scores
Source	Rating
AllMusic	4.5/5 stars
The Encyclopedia of Popular Music	4/5 stars
The Penguin Guide to Jazz Recordings	3/4 stars
The Rolling Stone Jazz Record Guide	5/5 stars

It's Uptown is the second studio album by jazz/soul guitarist George Benson.

== Background ==
This was Benson's second album, and the first of two to be produced by John Hammond. It was recorded after Benson's move to CBS.

== Track listing ==
No.	Title	Writer(s)	Length
1.	"Clockwise"	Benson	4:25
2.	"Summertime"	DuBose Heyward, George Gershwin	2:22
3.	"Ain't That Peculiar"	Marv Tarplin, Bobby Rogers, Smokey Robinson, Pete Moore	2:54
4.	"Jaguar"	Benson	2:44
5.	"Willow Weep for Me"	Ann Ronell	7:37
6.	"A Foggy Day"	George Gershwin, Ira Gershwin	2:31
7.	"Hello Birdie"	Benson	3:58
8.	"Bullfight"	Benson	3:46
9.	"Stormy Weather"	Harold Arlen, Ted Koehler	2:55
10.	"Eternally"	Benson	4:02
11.	"Myna Bird Blues"	Benson	4:35
Total length:			41:49

=== 2007 remastered CD / Blu-spec CD bonus tracks ===
No.	Title	Writer(s)	Length
12.	"J.H. Bossa Nova"	Benson	4:58
13.	"Eternally" (Short version)	Benson	2:45
14.	"Sideman"	Lonnie Smith	4:48
15.	"Minor Chant"	Stanley Turrentine	3:24
Total length:			57:44

== Personnel ==
The George Benson Quartet

- George Benson – guitar, vocals on "Summertime", "A Foggy Day" and "Stormy Weather"
- Ronnie Cuber – baritone saxophone
- Bennie Green – trombone
- Lonnie Smith – organ
- Jimmy Lovelace – drums
- Ray Lucas – drums (tracks 2, 3)

with:

- Blue Mitchell – trumpet (tracks 14–15)
- Charlie Persip – drums (tracks 14–15)
- Don Hunstein – photography
