= The New Boss Guitar of George Benson =

Studio album by George Benson
- Released: October 1964
- Recorded: May 1, 1964; "My Three Sons" on May 14, 1964
- Genre: Soul jazz
- Length: 34:43
- Label: Prestige
- Producer: Lew Futterman

George Benson chronology
The New Boss Guitar of George Benson (1964)	It's Uptown (1966)

Singles from The New Boss Guitar of George Benson
- 1. "Just Another Sunday" Released: 1964

Professional ratings
Review scores
Source	Rating
AllMusic	4/5 stars
The Penguin Guide to Jazz Recordings	3/4 stars
The Rolling Stone Jazz Record Guide	3/5 stars

The New Boss Guitar of George Benson is the debut studio album by American jazz/soul guitarist George Benson released in 1964 under Prestige Records.

== Track listing (for Prestige PR 7310) ==
All tracks are written by George Benson, except where noted.

Side one
No.	Title	Length
1.	"Shadow Dancers"	4:45
2.	"The Sweet Alice Blues"	4:36
3.	"I Don't Know"	6:45

Side two
No.	Title	Writer(s)	Length
4.	"Just Another Sunday"		2:28
5.	"Will You Still Be Mine"	Matt Dennis, Tom Adair	2:25
6.	"Easy Living""	Leo Robin, Ralph Rainger	6:33
7.	"Rock-A-Bye"		3:55

Bonus track
No.	Title	Writer(s)	Length
8.	"My Three Sons"	Jack McDuff, Joe Dukes	5:37
Total length:			34:43

== Personnel ==
- George Benson – guitar

The Brother Jack McDuff Quartet

- Brother Jack McDuff – piano, organ
- Red Holloway – tenor saxophone
- Ronnie Boykins – bass (tracks 1–7)
- Montego Joe – drums (tracks 1–7)
- Joe Dukes – drums (track 8)
