= Bomb the Twist =

EP by The 5.6.7.8's
- Released: January 11, 1996
- Genres: Rockabilly; punk rock
- Label: Sympathy for the Record Industry
- Producer: The 5.6.7.8's

The 5.6.7.8's chronology
The 5.6.7.8's (1994)	Bomb the Twist (1996)	Pin Heel Stomp (1997)

Professional ratings
Review scores
Source	Rating
Allmusic	2/5 stars

Bomb the Twist is an EP by the Japanese rock band the 5.6.7.8's, released on January 11, 1996. The song "Woo Hoo" was featured in the 2003 film Kill Bill Volume 1, directed by Quentin Tarantino and was subsequently featured in Vonage commercials.

Bomb the Twist was recorded for the US record label Sympathy for the Record Industry.

== Track listing ==
1. "Bomb the Twist"
2. "Jane in the Jungle"
3. "Three Cool Chicks"
4. "Guitar Date"
5. "Woo Hoo"
6. "Dream Boy"

== Personnel ==
- Ronnie Fujiyama - guitar, vocals, voice
- Screaming "Omo" Chellio Panther - bass, backing vocals, voice
- Sachiko "Geisha-Girl" Fujii - drums, backing vocals
