= Dr. Lonnie Smith =

American jazz organist (1942–2021)

Lonnie Smith
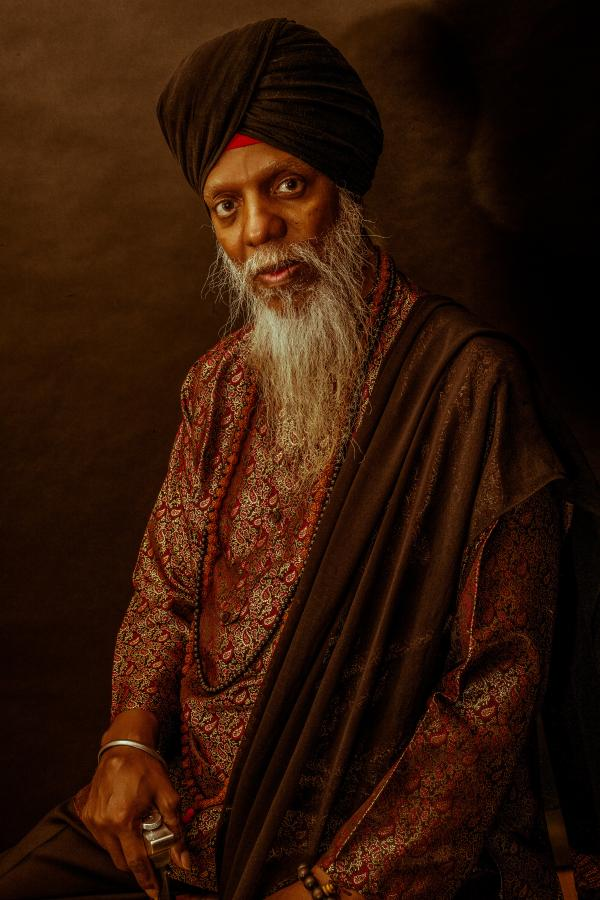
- Smith, c. 2017

Background information
- Born: July 3, 1942; Lackawanna, New York, U.S.
- Died: September 28, 2021 (aged 79) Fort Lauderdale, Florida, U.S.
- Genres: Jazz; soul jazz; funk
- Occupation: Musician
- Instrument: Organ
- Years active: 1960–2021
- Labels: Columbia; Blue Note; Kudu; Groove Merchant; TK; Criss Cross; Palmetto; Pilgrimage
- Website: www.drlonniesmith.com

Lonnie Smith (July 3, 1942 – September 28, 2021), styled as Dr. Lonnie Smith, was an American jazz Hammond B3 organist who was a member of the George Benson quartet in the 1960s. He recorded albums with saxophonist Lou Donaldson for Blue Note before being signed as a solo act. He owned the label Pilgrimage, and was named the year's best organist by the Jazz Journalists Association nine times.

== Early life ==
Smith was born in Lackawanna, New York, on July 3, 1942. He was raised by his mother and stepfather, and the family had a vocal group and radio program. He stated that his mother was a major influence on him musically, as she introduced him to gospel, classical, and jazz music.

== Career ==
Smith was part of several vocal ensembles in the 1950s, including the Teen Kings, with saxophonist Grover Washington Jr. and his brother Darryl on drums. Art Kubera, the owner of a local music store, gave Smith his first organ, a Hammond B3.

=== George Benson Quartet ===
Smith's affinity for R&B mixed with his own personal style as he became active in the local music scene. He moved to New York City in 1965, where he met George Benson, the guitarist for Jack McDuff's band. Benson and Smith connected on a personal level, and the two formed the George Benson Quartet, featuring Lonnie Smith, in 1966.

=== Solo career; Finger Lickin' Good ===
After two albums under Benson's leadership, It's Uptown and Cookbook, Smith recorded his first solo album (Finger Lickin' Good Soul Organ) in 1967, with George Benson (and guest Melvin Sparks) on guitar, Ronnie Cuber on baritone saxophone, and Marion Booker on drums. This combination remained stable for the next five years.

After recording several albums with Benson, Smith became a solo recording artist and subsequently recorded over 30 albums under his own name. Numerous prominent jazz artists joined Smith on his albums and in his live performances, including Lee Morgan, David "Fathead" Newman, King Curtis, Terry Bradds, Blue Mitchell, Joey DeFrancesco, and Joe Lovano.

=== Blue Note Records ===
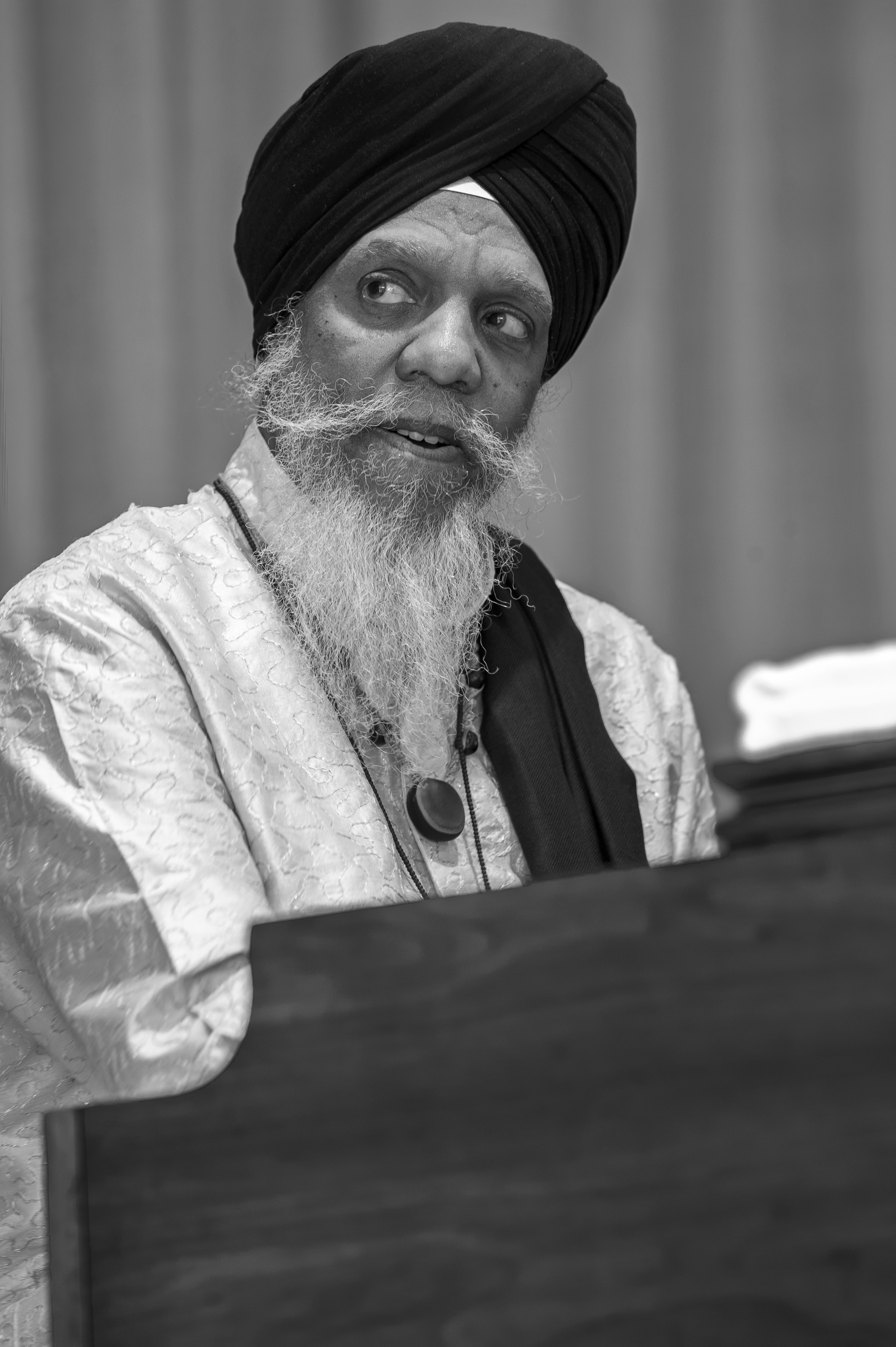
Smith in 2009

In 1967, Smith met Lou Donaldson, who put him in contact with Blue Note Records. Donaldson asked Smith and Benson to record with him on his Blue Note album Alligator Bogaloo, which was recorded in April 1967 and included Melvin Lastie Sr. and Leo Morris (a.k.a. Idris Muhammad). Blue Note signed Smith in 1968, and he released five albums on the label, including Think! (with Lee Morgan, David Newman, Melvin Sparks, and Marion Booker) and Turning Point (with Lee Morgan, Bennie Maupin, Melvin Sparks, and Idris Muhammad).

Smith's next album, Move Your Hand, was recorded at the Club Harlem in Atlantic City, New Jersey, in August 1969. The album's reception allowed his reputation to grow beyond the Northeast. He recorded another studio album, Drives, and a live album (unreleased at the time), Live at Club Mozambique (recorded in Detroit on May 21, 1970), before leaving Blue Note.

Smith recorded one album in 1971 for Creed Taylor's CTI subsidiary label Kudu, CTI having already signed George Benson. After a break from recording, he then spent most of the mid-1970s with producer Sonny Lester and his Groove Merchant label, then with Lester's new group of LRC labels. It resulted in four albums, with the music output veering between jazz, soul, funk, fusion, and even an odd disco-styled track.

Smith rejoined Blue Note in March 2015. He released his first Blue Note album in 45 years, titled Evolution, which was released January 29, 2016, featuring special guests Robert Glasper and Joe Lovano. His next Blue Note album, All in My Mind, was recorded live at the Jazz Standard in New York City (celebrating his 75th birthday with longtime musical associates – guitarist Jonathan Kreisberg and drummer Johnathan Blake), and released January 12, 2018. His third Blue Note album of this era, Breathe, was also recorded live and released March 26, 2021. It features Iggy Pop on two studio vocal tracks: "Why Can't We Live Together" and "Sunshine Superman".

== Tours and performances ==
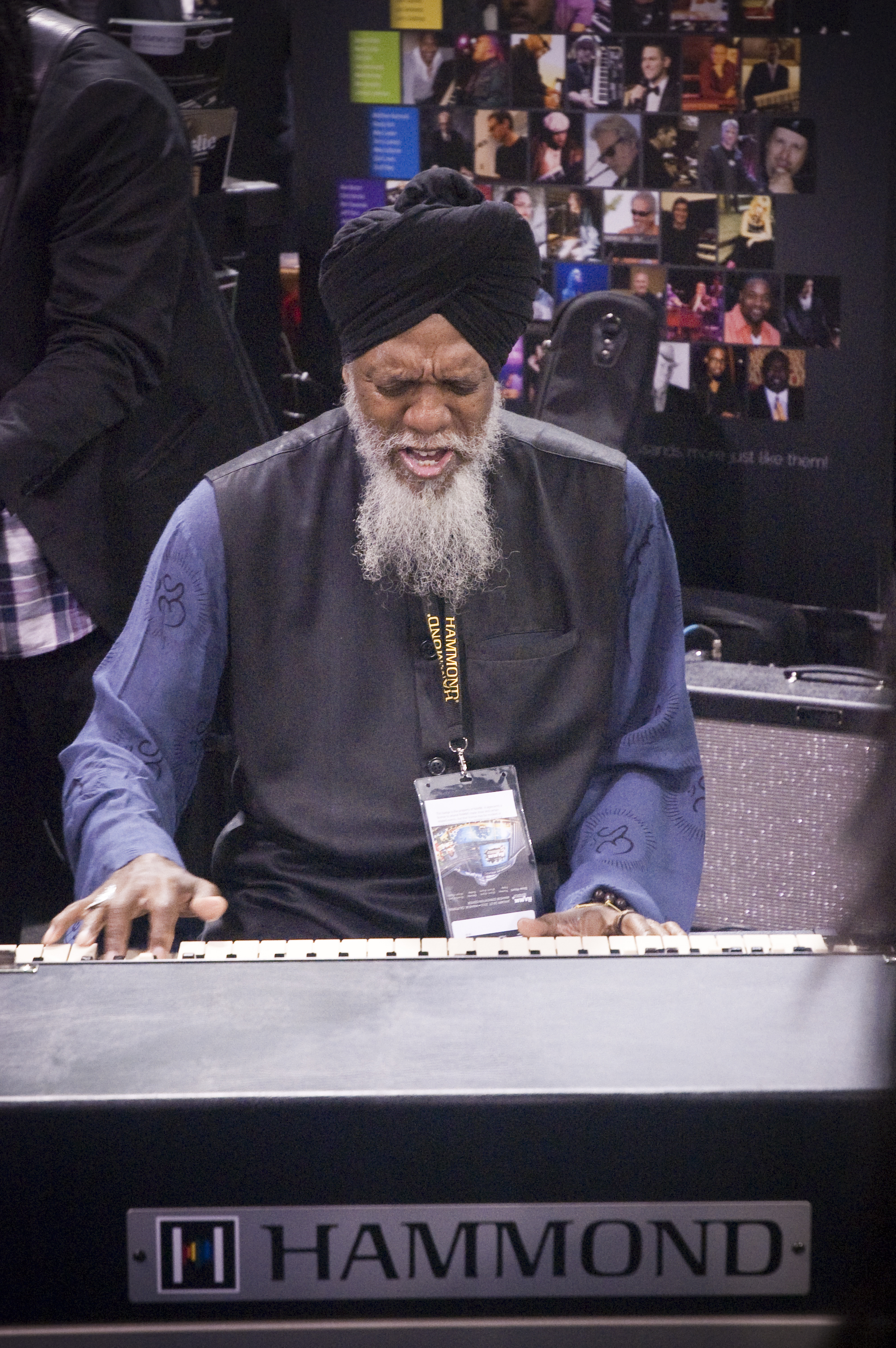
Smith at the NAMM Show in January 2013

Smith toured the northeastern United States heavily during the 1970s. He concentrated largely on smaller neighborhood venues during this period. His sidemen included Donald Hahn on trumpet; Ronnie Cuber, Dave Hubbard, Bill Easley, and George Adams on saxophones; George Benson, Perry Hughes, Marc Silver, Billy Rogers, and Larry McGee on guitars; and Joe Dukes, Sylvester Goshay, Phillip Terrell, Marion Booker, Jimmy Lovelace, Charles Crosby, Art Gore, Norman Connors, and Bobby Durham on drums.

Smith performed at several prominent jazz festivals, with artists including Grover Washington Jr., Ron Carter, Dizzy Gillespie, Lou Donaldson, Ron Holloway, and Carlos Santana. He also played with musicians outside of jazz, such as Dionne Warwick, Gladys Knight, and Etta James.

== Personal life ==
Smith had six children.

Smith died of pulmonary fibrosis on September 28, 2021, in Fort Lauderdale, Florida, at the age of 79.

== Public image ==
Starting in the 1970s, Smith added the "Dr." title to his name. The origin of the moniker is unclear and was not an academic title. One theory is that fellow musicians called Smith this due to his ability to "doctor up" their music. Another is that he adopted the title in an attempt to differentiate himself from other musicians. Smith himself gave the following explanation:

But I’m a doctor of music. I’ve been playing long enough to operate on it, and I do have a degree, and I will operate on you. I’m a neurosurgeon. If you need something done to you, I can do it. But when I go up on that stand, the only thing I’m thinking of is music. I’m thinking to touch you with that music. I don’t think about the turban, I don’t think about the doctor – I just think about how I’m going to touch you.

Smith was well known for wearing a turban. He stated that the turban had no religious significance and was something he had worn since he was young. Matt Collar of AllMusic suggested the turban was a theatrical gesture to his spiritual views on music, but Smith himself said he did not know why he started wearing a turban and referenced the iconic headwear of Sun Ra and Sonny Rollins's mohawk.

== Awards and honors ==
- Organ Keyboardist of the Year, Jazz Journalists Association, 2003–05, 2008–11, 2013, 2014
- NEA Jazz Master Award, 2017

== Discography ==
=== As leader ===
- Finger Lickin' Good Soul Organ (Columbia, 1967)
- Think! (Blue Note, 1968)
- Turning Point (Blue Note, 1969)
- Move Your Hand (Blue Note, 1969)
- Drives (Blue Note, 1970)
- Mama Wailer (Kudu, 1971)
- Afro-desia (Groove Merchant, 1975)
- Keep on Lovin' (Groove Merchant, 1976)
- Funk Reaction (LRC [Lester Radio Corporation], 1977)
- Gotcha (LRC [Lester Radio Corporation], 1978)
- Lonnie Smith (America, 1979)
- When the Night Is Right! (Chiaroscuro, 1980)
- Lenox and Seventh (Black & Blue, 1985) – with Alvin Queen
- Afro Blue (Venus; MusicMasters/BMG, 1993) – a tribute to John Coltrane initially released as by "The Lonnie Smith = John Abercrombie Trio"
- Foxy Lady – Tribute to Jimi Hendrix (Venus; MusicMasters/BMG, 1994)
- Purple Haze – Tribute to Jimi Hendrix (Venus; MusicMasters/BMG, 1994)
- Live at Club Mozambique (Blue Note, 1995) – recorded in 1970
- The Turbanator (32 Jazz, 2000) – recorded in 1991
- Boogaloo to Beck: A Tribute (Scufflin', 2003)
- Too Damn Hot! (Palmetto, 2004)
- Jungle Soul (Palmetto, 2006)
- Rise Up! (Palmetto, 2008)
- The Art of Organizing (Criss Cross, 2009) – recorded in 1993
- Spiral (Palmetto, 2010)
- The Healer [live] (Pilgrimage, 2012)
- In the Beginning (Pilgrimage, 2013)[2CD]
- Evolution (Blue Note, 2016)
- All in My Mind (Blue Note, 2018)
- Breathe (Blue Note, 2021) – with vocals by Iggy Pop

=== As sideman ===
With Eric Allison

- Mean Streets Beat (Contemporary, 1996)
- After Hours (Contemporary, 1997)

With George Benson

- It's Uptown (Columbia, 1966)
- The George Benson Cookbook (Columbia, 1967)

With Lou Donaldson

- Alligator Bogaloo (Blue Note, 1967)
- Mr. Shing-A-Ling (Blue Note, 1967)
- Midnight Creeper (Blue Note, 1968)
- Everything I Play Is Funky (Blue Note, 1970)
- Play the Right Thing (Milestone, 1990)
- Caracas (Milestone, 1993)
- Sentimental Journey (Columbia, 1995)
- Relaxing at Sea: Live on the QE2 (Chiaroscuro, 1999)

With Richie Hart

- Remembering Wes (Compose, 1989)
- Greasy Street (Zoho, 2005)

With Red Holloway

- Red Soul (Prestige, 1966)
- Coast to Coast (Milestone, 2003)
With Javon Jackson
- A Look Within (Blue Note, 1996)
- Easy Does It (Palmetto, 2002)
- Have You Heard (Palmetto, 2004)
- Now (Palmetto, 2006)

With Jimmy McGriff

- State of the Art (Milestone, 1985)
- McGriff's House Party (Milestone, 1999)

With Jimmy Ponder

- So Many Stars (Milestone, 1985)
- Come On Down (Muse, 1991)
- To Reach a Dream (Muse, 1991)

With others

- Johnny Adams, One Foot in the Blues (Rounder, 1996)
- Bobby Broom, Modern Man (Delmark, 2001)
- Karl Denson's Tiny Universe, The Bridge (Relaxed, 2002)
- Rodney Jones, Soul Manifesto (Blue Note, 2001)
- Kresten Osgood, Hammond Rens (ILK Music [denmark], 2003)
- Akira Tana, Secret Agent Men (Sons of Sound, 1992)
- Chester 'CT' Thompson, Mixology (Doodlin', 2012)
- Mark Whitfield, Mark Whitfield and the Groove Masters (Vega [jp], 2006)
