= Woo-Hoo (Rock-A-Teens song) =

Single by The Rock-A-Teens

from the album Woo Hoo
- B-side: "Untrue"
- Released: September 1959
- Recorded: 1959
- Genre: Rockabilly
- Length: 2:10
- Label: Roulette
- Songwriter: George Donald McGraw

The Rock-A-Teens singles chronology
"Woo-Hoo" (1959)	"Twangy" (1959)

"Woo Hoo" is a rockabilly song, credited to Roanoke, Virginia country music DJ, Dick Moran, and music store DORAN records. It was later purchased and released by George Donald McGraw and The Rock-A-Teens in 1959.

It is also the title track of The Rock-A-Teens 1959 album featuring the songs: "Woo Hoo"; "Doggone It Baby"; "I'm Not Afraid"; "That's My Mama"; "Dance to the Bop"; "Story of a Woman"; "Twangy"; "Janis Will Rock"; "Pagan"; "Lotta Boppin'"; "Oh My Nerves"; and "I Was Born to Rock".

== Original version ==
The song is distinctive for its lack of lyrics apart from its title words, which gave it popularity around the world as it is not subject to language barriers. It makes use of the twelve-bar blues chord progression, further adding to its accessibility. The song is featured in the end credits of John Waters's film Pecker.

== Musicians ==
- Vic Mizelle (vocals, guitar)
- Bobby "Boo" Walke (guitar)
- Bill Cook (guitar)
- Eddie Robinson (sax)
- Paul Dixon (bass)
- Bill Smith (drums)

== Cover versions ==
"Woo Hoo" was covered by the Scottish rock band, The Revillos, (under the name "Yeah Yeah"), under the same title by the French psychobilly (or as they say themselves, "yé-yé-punk") band Les Wampas on their 1988 album, Chauds, sales et humides, by the Japanese girl band The 5.6.7.8's on their 1996 album Bomb the Twist and as a dance/electronica track in 2005 by the American act The Daltronics. It was also covered by Showaddywaddy. The Replacements have also performed it in concert on several occasions.

The 5.6.7.8's version gained cult popularity when they performed it in Quentin Tarantino's 2003 film Kill Bill: Volume 1; it also appears on its soundtrack. Additionally, it appears in the film Glory Road. In 2004, after appearing in Kill Bill: Vol. 1 and an advertisement for Carling beer, the cover peaked at No. 28 on the UK Singles Chart, a rare Western singles chart appearance for a Japanese band. The song is also used, in part, in a Vonage advertising campaign in the United States. "Gloo Gloo," a cover of the 5.6.7.8's version of the song, was created by Christophe Héral for the 2013 video game Rayman Legends.
