= The 5.6.7.8's =

Japanese rock band

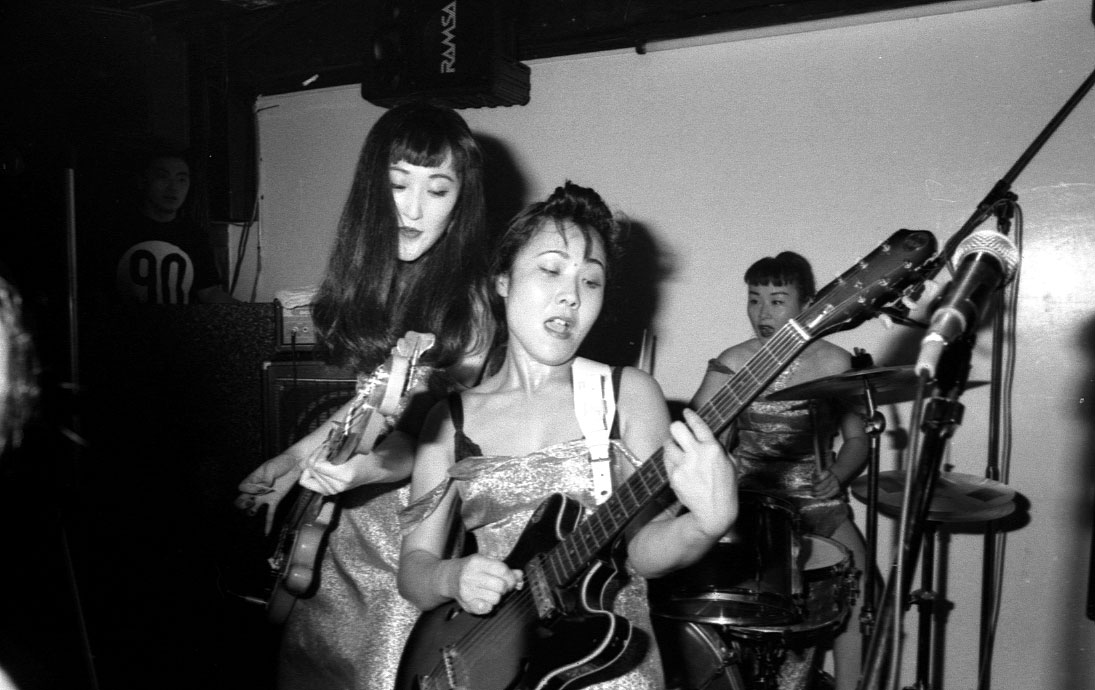
- The 5.6.7.8's performing in Shinjuku, 1994

Background information
- Origin: Tokyo, Japan
- Genres: Garage rock; rock and roll; punk rock; rockabilly; surf rock; garage punk
- Years active: 1986–present
- Labels: Time Bomb; Third Man; Au Go Go; Sympathy; Planet Pimp; Norton; Estrus; Dionysus; Hi-Tide Recordings
- Members: Yoshiko "Ronnie" Fujiyama; Sachiko Fujii; Akiko Omo
- Past members: Yoshie; Rico; Mikako; Eddie Legend; Gaku; Aya; Yoshiko "Yama" Yamaguchi
- Website: Official website

The 5.6.7.8's are a Japanese rock band from Tokyo that formed in 1986. Since 1992, the band's line-up has consisted of Ronnie Fujiyama (vocals, guitar), her sister Sachiko Fujii (drums, vocals; née Fujiyama) and Akiko Omo (bass, vocals). Outside of Japan, the band are best known for their performance in 2003's Kill Bill: Volume 1. The band's music contains a retro-inspired sound that draws heavily from the 1960s garage rock scene. Their most recent album, Run Run Run, was released in June 2026.

== Members ==
The 5.6.7.8's formed when Sachiko and Yoshiko "Ronnie" Fujiyama, two sisters from Tokyo who both shared a passion for rock and roll, founded the band in 1986 with two other members. Originally, the line-up consisted of Yoshiko on vocals and lead guitar, Rico on second guitar, Yoshie on bass guitar and Sachiko on drums. After several line-up changes (including bassist Yoshiko "Yama" Yamaguchi (Note: Not to be confused with the similarly-named singer and actress.), who was the bassist featured in the Kill Bill movie), the band eventually became a trio after Rico's and Yoshie's departures. Yoshiko and Sachiko are still the main components in the band, and now Akiko Omo has rejoined the band as the bass guitarist (She originally joined the 5.6.7.8's in the early 1990s).

Even though the group mostly sing their songs in Japanese, they do many covers of American rock and roll records from the 1950s to the 1980s. However, their official website and most of their fansites and fanclubs are in Japanese, as they have their biggest following in their home country.

Yoshiko, who plays a Teisco guitar and sports a "Teenage Queen Delinquent" tattoo on her upper right arm, was initially the lead vocalist, but as the band performed more rock and roll songs originally performed by female groups, every member had equal parts in vocals and many songs are performed singing simultaneously.

== The 5.6.7.8's in the West ==
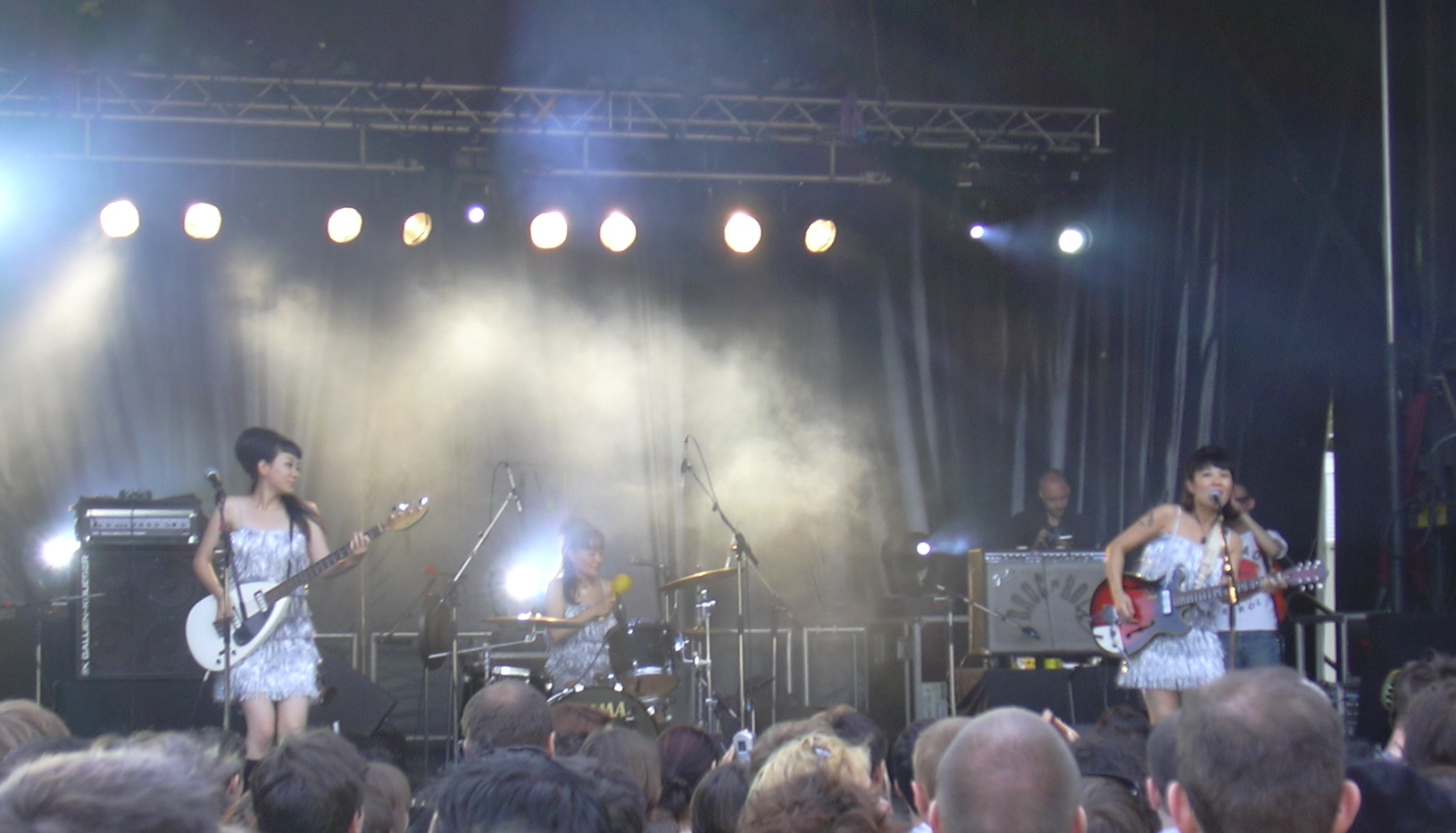
The 5.6.7.8's in concert in Lille, May 2004

The 5.6.7.8's released a string of recordings on American independent record labels in the mid-1990s, such as Estrus Records, Planet Pimp Records, and Sympathy For The Record Industry, but did not become widely known in the West until after their appearance in the 2003 film Kill Bill: Volume 1, in which they performed "I Walk Like Jayne Mansfield", "I'm Blue" (a cover of The Ikettes' song) and "Woo Hoo" in a Tokyo club called The House Of Blue Leaves. On the Special Bonus Features of the Kill Bill: Volume 1 DVD, one of the specials featured a live performance which shows the 5.6.7.8's singing "I Walk Like Jayne Mansfield" and "I'm Blue" during filming of the movie. The 5.6.7.8's song "The Barracuda" is featured in The Fast and the Furious: Tokyo Drift soundtrack.

According to Kill Bill director Quentin Tarantino, he discovered the music of the 5.6.7.8's after hearing it in an urban clothing store in Tokyo, hours before going to the airport. Tarantino asked if he could purchase the CD from the store, as he had no time to go to a music shop. When the shop assistant on duty refused, the manager was called. When Tarantino offered the manager double the retail price of the CD, he acquired it.

They also became renowned for the use of their cover of The Rock-A-Teens song, "Woo Hoo", in advertisements for Carling lager and Vonage VoIP service in the mid-2000s. The song reached No. 28 on the UK Singles Chart in 2004. Their follow-up single, "I'm Blue,” peaked at No. 71 on the same chart two months later.

The 5.6.7.8's have also toured many countries including China, Australia, the United States, and their native Japan. In 2019, they had an important participation in Rock al Parque in Colombia, as this was the 25th edition of the festival.

== Style and influences ==
The 5.6.7.8's music draws from multiple genres of American music, including rock and roll, surf, rockabilly, doo-wop, punk rock and psychobilly. According to Yoshiko "Ronnie" Fujiyama, the band wanted to "deconstruct rock 'n' roll into punk music by using distortion and noise and screaming." The band's influences include Chuck Berry and Sex Pistols. The 5.6.7.8's sound has been classified as garage rock, rock and roll, garage punk, punk rock, rockabilly, roots rock, surf punk and surf rock.

== Discography ==
Albums

- Golden Hits of the 5.6.7.8's (Tokyo Stiff, 1988) (Hana, 2003)
- The 5.6.7.8's (Timebomb, 1994)
- Teenage Mojo Workout (Timebomb, 2002)
- Tanukigoten (Timebomb, 2014)
- Run Run Run (Timebomb, 2026)

EPs

- Mondo Girls A-Go-Go (1989)
- I Was a Teenage Cave Woman !!! (Tokyo Karate, 1991)
- Bomb the Twist (Sympathy for the Record Industry, 1996)
- Pin Heel Stomp (Timebomb, 1998)
- Pretty Little Lily Can Dance No More 7" inch/CD EP (Deckrec, 2002)

Singles

- "Ah-So"/"She Was A Mau-Mau" (Giant Claw, 1992)
- "I Need A Man"/"Long Tall Sally" (Planet Pimp, 1993)
- "I Walk Like Jane Mansfield"/"Cat Fight Run" (Estrus, 1993)
- "Edi Is A Sweet Candy"/"Teenage Head"/"Scream" (Rockville, 1993)
- "The Spell Stroll"/"Roadrunner" (Weed, 1995)
- "Bomb The Twist"/"It's Rainy" (Sympathy For The Record Industry, 1996)
- "Continental Hop"/"Jump Jack, Jump" (Time Bomb, 1997)
- "The Barraacyda"/"Tallahassee Lassie" (Time Bomb, 1997)
- "Silly Willy"/"Mr. Lee" (Dionysus, 1998)
- "Come See Me"/"Mashed Potato"/"Gerupin Rock" (Thunderbaby, 1994)
- "I'm Blue"/"(I'm Sorry Mamma) I'm A Wild One" (Sweet Nothings, 2002)
- "Rock And Roll Santa"/"Harlem Shuffle" (Norton, 2003
- "Woo Hoo"/"Guitar Date" (Sweet Nothings, 2004)
- Split 7" single with The Church Keys - "19th Nervous Breakdown" (Norton, 2004)
- Sho-Jo-Ji (The Hungry Racoon)"/"Charuema Sobaya (The Soba Song)" (Third Man, 2011)
- Great Balls Of Fire"/"Hanky Panky" (Third Man, 2011)
- "Mothra" b/w "Dream Boy" (Time Bomb, 2014)
- "I Walk Like Jane Mansfield"/"Battle Without Honor Or Humanity (Kill Bill Theme)" (Time Bomb, 2017)
- "The Barracuda"/"Movin'" (Time Bomb, 2017)
- Steel Rats (Vinyl Special Edition) Split 7" single with Arkadiusz Reikowski - "The Hoovering" (Tate Multimedia, 2018)
- "Woo-Hoo"/"Dream Boy" (Time Bomb, 2018)
- Split 7"single with Bloodshot Bill - "My Little Muck Muck" (Time Bomb, 2019)
- "Nutrocker"/"Chopped Onion Boogie" (The 5, 6, 7, 8's; 2019)
- "My Little Muck Muck" (Pig Baby)

Live

- Live at Third Man Records (Third Man, 2011)

Compilations

- The 5.6.7.8's Can't Help It! (Au Go Go, Rockville, 1991)
- Bomb The Rocks: Early Days Singles 1989-1996 (Timebomb, 2003)
- Best Hits of the 5.6.7.8's (Timebomb, 2019)

Videos

- Squid Heaven Complete Edition Video 6 VHS (Ika-Ten, 1989) - "Motor Cycle Go-G0-Go"
- Where The Action Is!: Soft, Hell! VHS (Jungle Life/LAFF International/Soft, Hell!, 1996) - "Three Cool Cats"
- The Wild Weekend Video VHS/PAL (Exotic Entertainment, 1998)
- Bottle Up & Go!: Soft, Hell! Video Compilation #2 VHS (Jungle Life/LLAFF International/Soft, Hell!, 1998) - "Bomb The Twist"
- Kill Bill Volume 1 (Blu-ray) (Miramax/Roadshow Entertainment, 2003) - "I Walk Like Jane Mansfield", "I'm Blue" Both played live as a special feature
- Soft, Hell! Video Compilation Special Edition Ltd. 2XVHS (Soft, Hell!) - "Three Cool Cats", "Bomb The Twist"
- Live At The Garage Rockin' Craze split DVD=V with Saturns, The Rizlaz (Radio Underground, 2005)
- Once Upon A Time 1992-2008 DVD (Time Bomb, 2013)
