= The Rock-A-Teens =

American rockabilly group

The Rock-A-teens
- Also known as: Boo Walke & the Rockets
- Origin: Richmond, Virginia, United States
- Genres: Rockabilly, rock and roll
- Years active: 1956–c. 1960
- Labels: Doran Records, Roulette Records
- Past members: Vic Mizelle (vocals, guitar), Milton "Boo" Walke (guitar), Bill Cook (guitar), Eddie Robinson (saxophone), Paul Dixon (bass), Bill Smith (drummer)

The Rock-A-Teens were a short-lived United States rockabilly group from Richmond, Virginia, active in the late 1950s, led by Vic Mizelle.

The Rock-a-Teens were one-hit wonders whose lone hit record was "Woo Hoo", written by George Donald McGraw and backed with "Untrue", released on Roulette Records R 4192. The song hit No. 16 on the Billboard Hot 100.

== Career ==
The Rock-A-Teens formed in 1956 as Boo Walke & the Rockets while still in high school. After the initial success of "Woo-Hoo", they cut an album of the same name. Meanwhile Roulette Records issued a follow-up single of "Twangy" and "Doggone It Baby". Neither the album or follow-up single was successful. The group broke up shortly after and none of the members continued in the music business. Vic Mizelle went on with other Richmond groups for years.

== Discography ==
=== Album ===
- Woo Hoo (1960) Roulette Records SR 25109 - Recorded November 1959 and Spring 1960.

Track Listing

1. "Woo-Hoo" (George Donald McGraw) - 2:05
2. "Doggone It Baby" (Victor Mizelle) - 2:23
3. "I'm Not Afraid" (Mizelle) - 2:15
4. "That's My Mama" (Billy Smith) - 1:41
5. "Dance To the Bop" (Floyd Edge) - 2:23
6. "Story Of A Woman" (Mizelle) - 2:00
7. "Twangy" (Bobby "Boo" Walker) - 2:00
8. "Janis Will Rock" (Mizelle) - 2:27
9. "Pagan" (Mizelle) - 2:08
10. "Lotta Boppin'" (Mizelle) - 2:23
11. "Oh My Nerves" (Walker) - 2:07
12. "I Was Born To Rock" (Mizelle) - 2:32

Technical Staff

- Producer – Joe Reisman

=== Singles ===
- "Woo Hoo" (McGraw) / "Untrue" (Mizelle), Roulette R-4192 - 1959
- "Twangy" (Walker) / "Doggone It Baby" (Mizelle), Roulette R-4217 - 1959

== Original members ==
- Vic Mizelle (vocals, guitar) (died 2017)
- Bobby "Boo" Walke (guitar) (died 1998)
- Bill Cook (guitar) (died 1971)
- Eddie Robinson (sax)
- Paul Dixon (bass) (died 2007)
- Bill Smith (drums)
