= George Benson =

American guitarist and singer (born 1943)

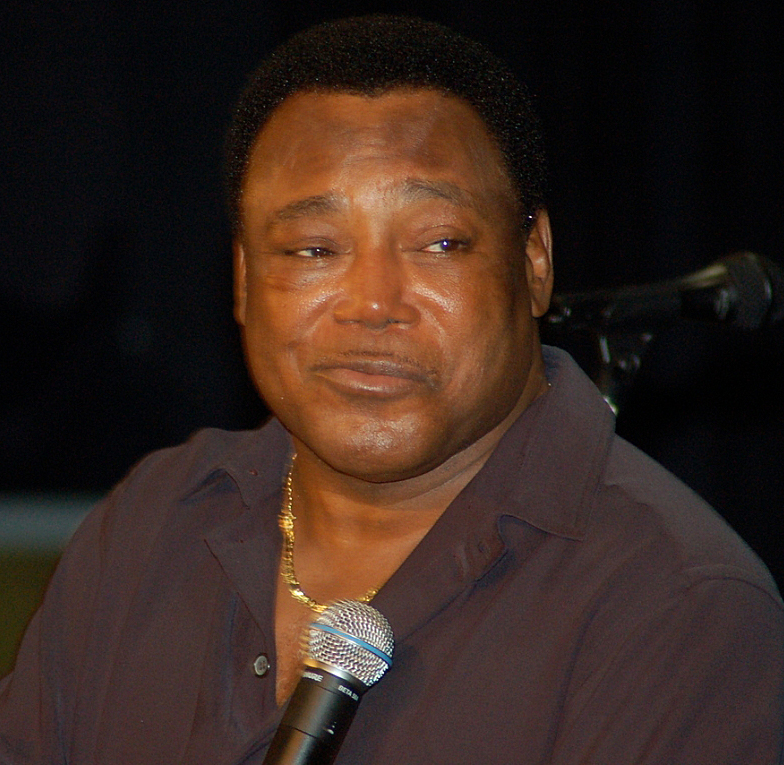
- Benson in 2011

Background information
- Born: George Washington Benson; March 22, 1943 (age 83); Pittsburgh, Pennsylvania, U.S.
- Genres: Jazz; jazz fusion; smooth jazz; soul jazz; disco; adult contemporary; urban contemporary
- Occupations: Singer; musician; songwriter
- Instruments: Vocals; guitar
- Years active: 1964–present
- Labels: Prestige; Columbia; Verve; A&M; CTI; Warner Bros.; GRP; Concord; Mascot
- Website: georgebenson.com

Awards and nominations
Award	Wins	Nominations
American Music Awards	0	3
Grammy	10	25
MOBO	1	2
Soul Train	0	2
Photoplay Awards	1	1
Walk Of Fame	1	1

External videos
- Oral History, George Benson reflects on his friendship with Bob Cavenaugh and the influence it had on his career. Interview date January 24, 2015, NAMM (National Association of Music Merchants) Oral History Library

George Washington Benson (born March 22, 1943) is an American jazz fusion guitarist, singer, and songwriter. He began his professional career at the age of 19 as a jazz guitarist.

A former child prodigy, Benson first came to prominence in the 1960s, playing soul jazz with Jack McDuff and others. He then launched a successful solo career, alternating between jazz, pop, R&B singing, and scat singing. His album Breezin' was certified triple-platinum, hitting No. 1 on the Billboard album chart in 1976. His concerts were well attended through the 1980s, and he still has a large following. Benson has won ten Grammy Awards and has been honored with a star on the Hollywood Walk of Fame.

== Biography ==
=== Early career ===
Benson was born and raised in the Hill District of Pittsburgh, Pennsylvania. At the age of seven, he first played the ukulele in a corner drug store, for which he was paid a few dollars. At age eight, he played guitar in an unlicensed nightclub on Friday and Saturday nights, but the police soon closed the club down. At age nine, he started to record. Out of the four sides he cut, two were released: "She Makes Me Mad" backed with "It Should Have Been Me", with RCA Victor in New York. Although one source indicates this record was released under the name "Little Georgie", the 45 rpm label is printed with the name George Benson. The single was produced by Leroy Kirkland for RCA's rhythm and blues label, Groove Records.

Benson attended Connelley Vocational High School on Bedford Avenue in the Hill District. However, he dropped out, choosing to focus on music. In 1987, Benson received an honorary degree from Pittsburgh Public Schools.

As a youth, Benson learned how to play straight-ahead instrumental jazz during a relationship performing for several years with organist Jack McDuff. One of his many early guitar heroes was country-jazz guitarist Hank Garland.

At the age of 21, he recorded his first album as leader, The New Boss Guitar of George Benson (1964), featuring McDuff. Benson's next recording was It's Uptown (1966) with the George Benson Quartet, including Lonnie Smith on organ and Ronnie Cuber on baritone saxophone. Benson followed it up with The George Benson Cookbook (1967), also with Lonnie Smith and Ronnie Cuber on baritone and drummer Marion Booker. Miles Davis employed Benson in the mid-1960s, featuring his guitar on "Paraphernalia" on his 1968 Columbia release, Miles in the Sky before Benson went to Verve Records.

=== 1970s and 1980s ===
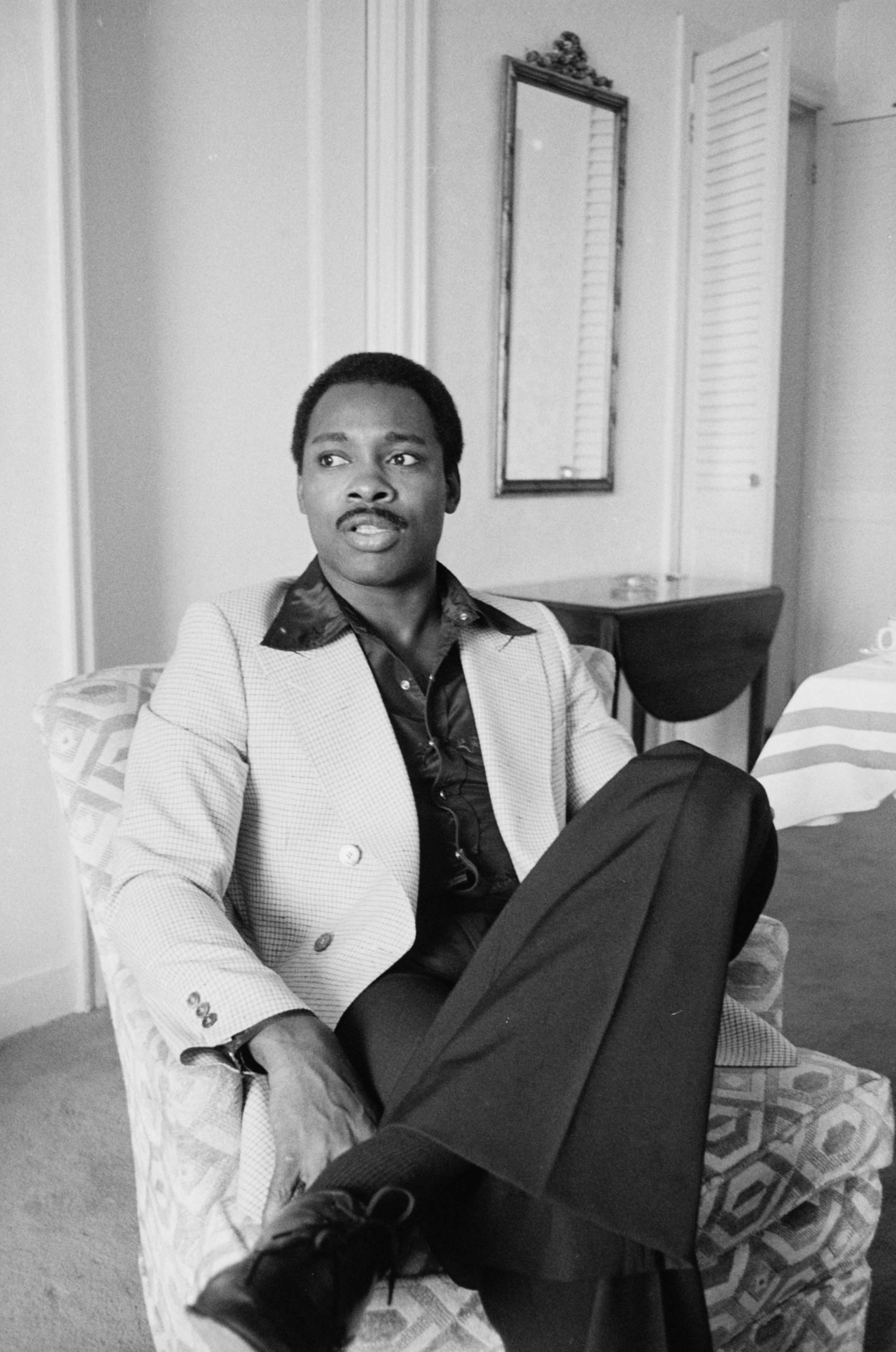
George Benson, New York 1977

In 1970, Benson released The Other Side of Abbey Road, featuring renditions of songs from the Beatles' 1969 album Abbey Road. Benson then signed with Creed Taylor's jazz label CTI Records, where he recorded several albums, with jazz heavyweights guesting, to some success, mainly in the jazz field. In addition to his own albums and performances, during this time Benson was a core member of the CTI All-Stars collective both touring and recording. As well as the collective's live albums, he also played and recorded on a number of the collective's members' individual albums, including Freddie Hubbard and Stanley Turrentine, notably on the latter's acclaimed album Sugar (1970). Benson played on Hubbard's 1971 album First Light, which won a Grammy Award for Best Jazz Performance by a Group at the 15th Annual Grammy Awards, as well as five other Hubbard studio albums.

Benson released a version of "White Rabbit" on the album of the same name in 1972, originally written and recorded by San Francisco rock group Great Society, and made famous by Jefferson Airplane. His 1974 release, Bad Benson, climbed to the top spot in the Billboard jazz chart, while the 1976 follow-ups, Good King Bad (No. 51 Pop album) and Benson & Farrell (with Joe Farrell), both reached the jazz top-three sellers.

George Benson "Breezin'" (1976)
Title track sample from George Benson's Breezin′ album

By the mid-to-late 1970s, as he recorded for Warner Bros. Records, a whole new audience began to discover Benson. On 1976's Breezin', Benson sang a lead vocal on the track "This Masquerade", a song written by Leon Russell. Benson's version (notable also for the lush, romantic piano intro and solo by Jorge Dalto), became a huge pop hit and won a Grammy Award for Record of the Year. (He had sung vocals infrequently on albums earlier in his career, notably his rendition of "Here Comes the Sun" on The Other Side of Abbey Road.) The rest of the album is instrumental, including his rendition of the 1975 José Feliciano composition "Affirmation".

In 1976, Benson embarked on a tour called George & Minnie Live! with soul singer Minnie Riperton; she had recently been diagnosed with terminal breast cancer and would die in 1979. In addition, Benson appeared as a guitarist and backup vocalist on Stevie Wonder's song "Another Star" from Wonder's album Songs in the Key of Life (1976).

He also recorded the original version of "The Greatest Love of All" for the 1977 Muhammad Ali biopic, The Greatest, which was later covered by Whitney Houston as "Greatest Love of All." During this time Benson recorded with the German conductor Claus Ogerman. The live take of "On Broadway," recorded a few months later from the 1978 release Weekend in L.A., also won a Grammy.

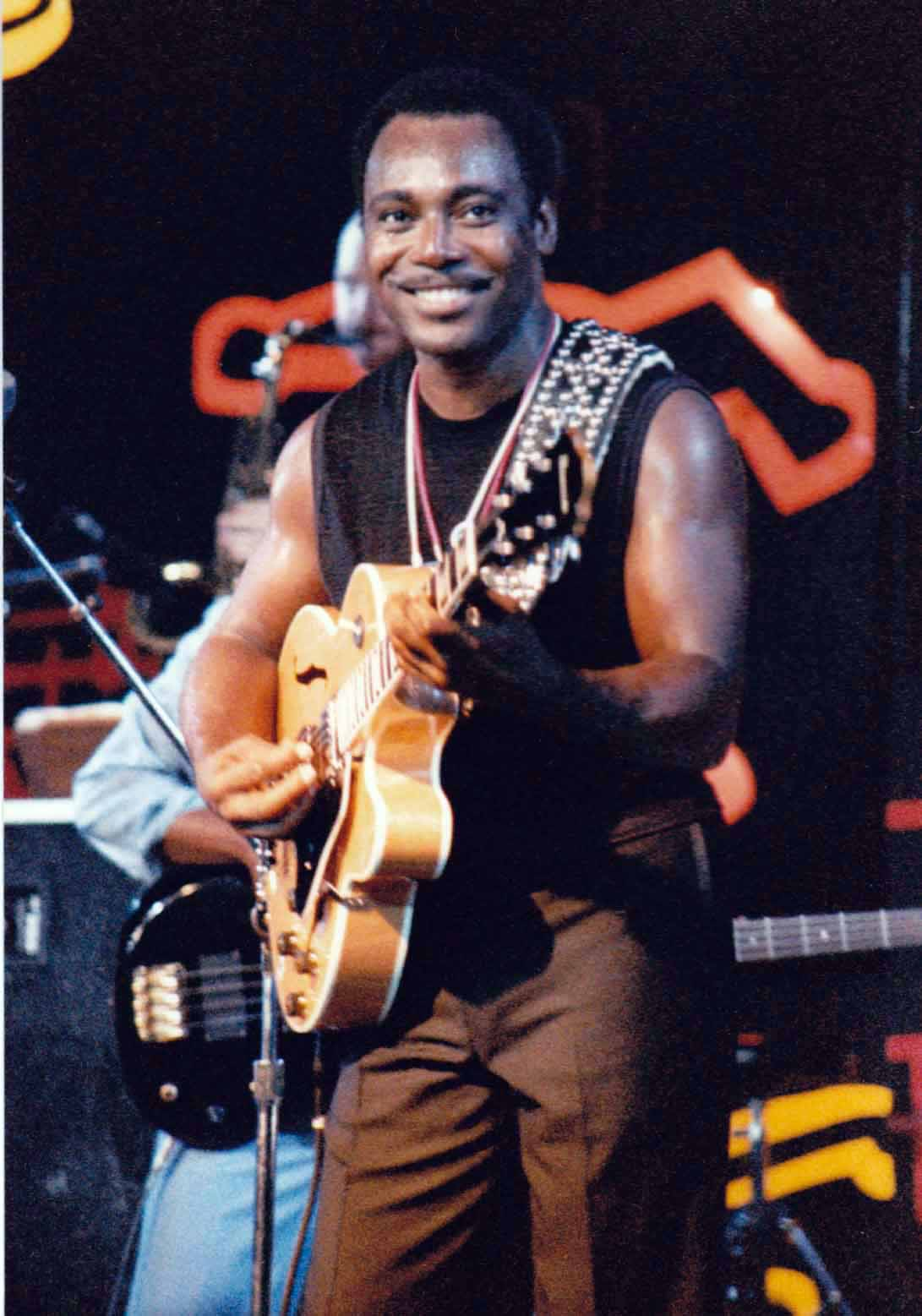
Benson in Montreux 1986

The Qwest record label (a subsidiary of Warner Bros., run by Quincy Jones) released Benson's breakthrough pop album Give Me the Night, produced by Jones. Benson made it into the pop and R&B top ten with the song "Give Me the Night" (written by former Heatwave keyboardist Rod Temperton). He had many hit singles such as "Love All the Hurt Away", "Turn Your Love Around", "Inside Love", "Lady Love Me", "20/20", "Shiver", and "Kisses in the Moonlight". More importantly, Jones encouraged Benson to search his roots for further vocal inspiration, and he rediscovered his love for Nat King Cole, Ray Charles and Donny Hathaway in the process, influencing a string of further vocal albums into the 1990s. Despite returning to his jazz and guitar playing most recently, this theme was reflected again much later in Benson's 2000 release Absolute Benson, featuring a cover of one of Hathaway's most notable songs, "The Ghetto". Benson accumulated three other platinum LPs and two gold albums.

=== 1990s to present ===
In 1990, Benson was awarded an Honorary Doctorate of Music from the Berklee College of Music.

To commemorate the long relationship between Benson and Ibanez and to celebrate 30 years of collaboration on the GB Signature Models, Ibanez created the GB30TH, a limited-edition model with a gold-foil finish inspired by the traditional Japanese Garahaku art form.

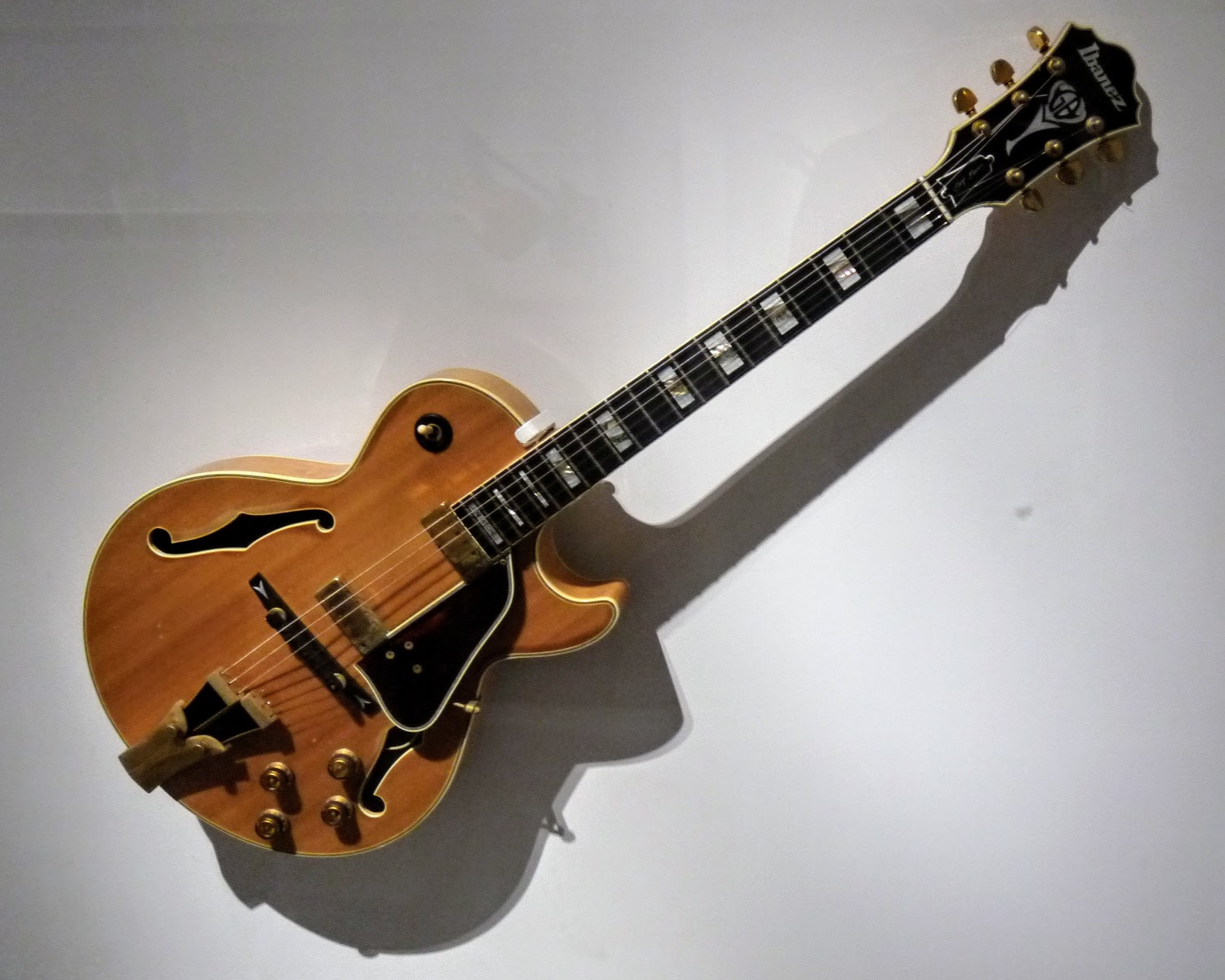
A 1978 Ibanez George Benson signature guitar played by Joni Mitchell from at least 1979 to 1983

In 2009, Benson was recognized by the National Endowment of the Arts as a Jazz Master, the United States highest honor in jazz. Benson performed at the 49th issue of the Ohrid Summer Festival in North Macedonia on July 25, 2009, and his tribute show to Nat King Cole, An Unforgettable Tribute to Nat King Cole, as part of the Istanbul International Jazz Festival in Turkey on July 27.

In late 2009, Benson finished recording an album entitled Songs and Stories with Marcus Miller, producer John Burk, and session musicians David Paich and Steve Lukather. As part of the promotion for the album, Benson appeared or performed on The Tavis Smiley Show, Jimmy Kimmel Live! and Late Night with Jimmy Fallon.

He performed at the 2011 Java Jazz Festival during March 4–6. On October 4, Benson released the album Guitar Man, revisiting his 1960s/early-1970s guitar-playing roots with a 12-song collection of covers of both jazz and pop standards produced by John Burk.

In June 2013, Benson released his fourth album for Concord, Inspiration: A Tribute to Nat King Cole, which included Wynton Marsalis, Idina Menzel, Till Brönner, and Judith Hill. In September, he returned to perform at Rock in Rio festival, in Rio de Janeiro, 35 years after his first performance at this festival, which was then the inaugural one.

In July 2016, Benson participated as a mentor in the Sky Arts programme Guitar Star in the search for the UK and Republic of Ireland's most talented guitarist.

In May 2018, Benson was featured on the Gorillaz single "Humility".

George Benson – "This Masquerade"
Sample track from George Benson's Breezin' album (1976)

On July 12, 2018, it was announced that Benson had signed to Mascot Label Group.

Benson stopped touring internationally at the start of 2024 due to ill health, cancelling a series of UK concerts that summer.

Benson released a new album, Dreams Do Come True: When George Benson Meets Robert Farnon on July 19, 2024. The album was an abandoned project based on recordings with arranger and conductor Robert Farnon backed by the London Symphony Orchestra from 1989 that were thought to have been lost. Upon location of the masters, Benson played them for his current label, Rhino Entertainment, who encouraged Benson to complete the project. Were the album released when it was recorded it would have predated most of the wave of Great American Songbook albums released by popular artists at the end of the 20th century and well into the 21st century. Benson also announced plans for a four-night festival called Breezin' with the Stars planned for January 2025.

== Personal life ==
Benson has been married to Johnnie Lee since 1965 and has seven children. Benson describes his music as focusing more on love and romance, due to his commitment to his family and religious practices, with Benson being one of Jehovah's Witnesses. Benson has been a resident of Englewood, New Jersey.

== Awards ==
=== Grammy Awards ===
List of Grammy Awards and nominations received by George Benson.

Year	Nominee / work	Award	Result
1973	"White Rabbit"	Best Jazz Performance By A Group	Nominated
1977	"Theme From Good King Bad"	Best R&B Instrumental Performance	Won
1977	Breezin'	Best Pop Instrumental Performance	Won
1977	Breezin'	Album Of The Year	Nominated
1977	"This Masquerade"	Record Of The Year	Won
1977	"This Masquerade"	Best Male Pop Vocal Performance	Nominated
1979	"On Broadway"	Best Male R&B Vocal Performance	Won
1980	"Livin' Inside Your Love"	Best Jazz Fusion Performance, Vocal or Instrumental	Nominated
1980	"Love Ballad"	Best Male R&B Vocal Performance	Nominated
1981	Moody's Mood	Best Male Jazz Vocal Performance	Won
1981	"Off Broadway"	Best R&B Instrumental Performance	Won
1981	"Give Me the Night"	Best Male R&B Vocal Performance	Won
1983	"Turn Your Love Around"	Best Male R&B Vocal Performance	Nominated
1984	"Being With You"	Best Pop Instrumental Performance	Won
1986	"Beyond The Sea"	Best Male Jazz Vocal Performance	Nominated
1988	Collaboration	Best Jazz Fusion Performance, Vocal Or Instrumental	Nominated
1990	Tenderly	Best Male Jazz Vocal Performance	Nominated
1991	Big Boss Band	Best Male Jazz Vocal Performance	Nominated
1991	"Basie's Bag"	Best Jazz Instrumental Performance, Soloist	Nominated
1994	"Got To Be There"	Best Pop Instrumental Performance	Nominated
1998	"Song For My Brother"	Best Pop Instrumental Performance	Nominated
2005	"Take You Out"	Best Pop Instrumental Performance	Nominated
2007	"Mornin'"	Best Pop Instrumental Performance	Won
2007	"God Bless The Child"	Best Traditional R&B Performance	Won
2007	"Breezin'"	Best R&B Performance By A Duo Or Group With Vocals	Nominated
