= Burt Collins =

American jazz trumpeter (1931–2007)

Burton L. Collins (March 27, 1931, New York City – February 23, 2007, Philadelphia) was an American jazz trumpeter.

Collins was born in New York but raised in Philadelphia. He worked in the 1950s with Dizzy Gillespie, Urbie Green, Neal Hefti, Woody Herman, Elliot Lawrence, Johnny Richards, and Claude Thornhill. He relocated to New York again around 1960, where he played in Broadway orchestras and in ensembles with Cannonball Adderley, Albert Ayler, Jimmy McGriff, Blue Mitchell, Duke Pearson, and Stanley Turrentine, among others. He and Joe Shepley formed the group Collins-Shepley Galaxy in 1970, which recorded two albums, including a Lennon/McCartney tribute. Later the 1970s he worked with Urbie Green again as well as with Janis Ian (where he played the featured flugelhorn break on At Seventeen), Lee Konitz and David Matthews, and played flugelhorn on T. Rex's album Electric Warrior. His other associations include work with Sal Salvador, Pat Moran, Astrud Gilberto, George Benson, Manhattan Transfer, Airto Moreira, Paul Desmond, Eumir Deodato and Lalo Schifrin. He played little after the 1970s, though he appeared on record with Loren Schoenberg in 1987.

== Discography ==
With Manny Albam

- Sophisticated Lady (Coral, 1958)
- The Blues Is Everybody's Business (Coral, 1958)
- The Soul of the City (Solid State, 1966)

With Woody Herman

- Blues Groove (Capitol, 1956)
- The Herd Rides Again (Everest, 1958)
- The Fourth Herd (Jazz Legacy 1960)

With O'Donel Levy

- Breeding of Mind (Groove Merchant, 1972)
- Dawn of a New Day (Groove Merchant, 1973)
- Simba (Groove Merchant, 1974)

With David Matthews

- Shoogie Wanna Boogie (Kudu, 1976)
- Night Flight (Muse, 1977)
- Dune (CTI, 1977)
- Delta Lady (Electric Bird, 1980)

With Duke Pearson

- Introducing Duke Pearson's Big Band (Blue Note, 1968)
- Now Hear This (Blue Note, 1969)
- I Don't Care Who Knows It (Blue Note, 1996)
- It Could Only Happen with You (Blue Note, 1974)

With Johnny Richards

- Wide Range (Capitol, 1957)
- Experiments in Sound (Capitol, 1958)
- Walk Softly Run Wild (Coral, 1959)
- My Fair Lady My Way (Roulette, 1964)
- Aqui Se Habla Espanol (Roulette, 1967)

With others

- Albert Ayler, New Grass (Impulse!, 1969)
- Aztec Two-Step, Two's Company (RCA Victor, 1978)
- Tony Bennett, For Once in My Life (CBS, 1967)
- Tony Bennett, Snowfall (Columbia, 1994)
- George Benson, Shape of Things to Come (A&M,/(CTI, 1968)
- Luiz Bonfa, Jacaranda (JSR, 1998)
- James Brown, Reality (Polydor, 1996)
- Artie Butler, Have You Met Miss Jones? (A&M,/(CTI, 1968)
- Cy Coleman, The Party's On Me (RCA Victor, 1976)
- Al Jazzbo Collins, Presents Swinging at the Opera (Everest, 1960)
- Chris Connor, A Portrait of Chris (Atlantic, 1960)
- Eumir Deodato, Deodato 2 (CTI, 1973)
- Paul Desmond, Summertime (A&M, 1969)
- Bob Dorough, I'll Never Fall in Love Again (Music Minus One, 1970)
- Art Farmer, Something You Got (CTI, 1977)
- Frank Foster, Manhattan Fever (Blue Note, 2007)
- Astrud Gilberto, I Haven't Got Anything Better to Do (Verve, 1969)
- Astrud Gilberto, September 17, 1969 (Verve, 1970)
- Grant Green, The Main Attraction (Kudu, 1976)
- Urbie Green, Senor Blues (CTI, 1977)
- Urbie Green, The Message (RCA 1986)
- Dodo Greene, Ain't What You Do (Time, 1959)
- Slide Hampton, Two Sides of Slide (Fresh Sound, 1994)
- Richard Groove Holmes, New Groove (Groove Merchant, 1974)
- Cissy Houston, Think It Over (Private Stock, 1978)
- Rhetta Hughes, Starpiece (Sutra 1980)
- Janis Ian, Stars (Columbia, 1974)
- Janis Ian, Between the Lines (CBS/Sony, 1975)
- Garland Jeffreys, Ghost Writer (A&M, 1977)
- Garland Jeffreys, I'm Alive (Universal, 2006)
- J. J. Johnson, Say When (Bluebird, 1987)
- J. J. Johnson, Broadway Express (RCA 2002)
- Artie Kaplan, Confessions of a Male Chauvinist Pig (Hopi, 1972)
- Lee Konitz, The Lee Konitz Nonet (Roulette, 1977)
- Elliot Lawrence, Big Band Sound (Fresh Sound, 1991)
- Elliot Lawrence, The Music of Elliot Lawrence (Mobile Fidelity, 1995)
- Michel Legrand, Le Jazz Grand (Gryphon, 1979)
- Mike Longo, Explosion (Consolidated Artists, 1999)
- Trini Lopez, Transformed by Time (Birchmount 1978)
- Jon Lucien, Premonition (Columbia, 1976)
- Jon Lucien, Rashida (BMG, 1995)
- The Manhattan Transfer, Jukin' (Capitol, 1975)
- Herbie Mann, Glory of Love (A&M, 1967)
- Trade Martin, Let Me Touch You (Buddah, 1995)
- Jimmy McGriff, The Big Band (Solid State, 1966)
- Barry Miles, Sky Train (RCA Victor, 1977)
- Garnet Mimms, Has It All (Arista, 1978)
- Blue Mitchell, Smooth as the Wind (Riverside, 1961)
- Blue Mitchell, Heads Up! (Blue Note, 1968)
- Airto Moreira, Free (CTI, 1972)
- Milton Nascimento, Courage (A&M, 1969)
- David "Fathead" Newman, Mr. Fathead (Warner Bros., 1976)
- Ralfi Pagan, Ralfi (Fania/Discophon 1974)
- Houston Person, Harmony (Mercury, 1977)
- Nat Pierce, The Ballad of Jazz Street (Zim, 1980)
- Trudy Richards, Trudy (Musicor 1977)
- Trudy Richards, Manhattan Serenade (Beekman Place, 1990)
- Scarlet Rivera, Scarlet Fever (Warner Bros., 1978)
- Vicki Sue Robinson, Vicki Sue Robinson (RCA Victor, 1976)
- Vicki Sue Robinson, Never Gonna Let You Go (RCA Victor, 1976)
- Bill Russo, School of Rebellion (Roulette, 1960)
- Bill Russo, Seven Deadly Sins (Roulette, 1960)
- Sal Salvador, You Ain't Heard Nothin' Yet! (Dauntless, 1963)
- John Sebastian, John B. Sebastian (Reprise, 1970)
- George Segal, The Yama Yama Man (Philips, 1967)
- Lalo Schifrin, Towering Toccata (CTI, 1977)
- Loren Schoenberg, Time Waits for No One (Musicmasters, 1987)
- Bobby Scott, Forecast: Rain with Sunny Skies (Columbia, 1978)
- Bobby Scott, From Eden to Canaan (Sony, 1993)
- Bob Shad, A 65-Piece Rock Workshop (Mainstream, 1973)
- Marlena Shaw, Take a Bite (Columbia, 1979)
- Marvin Stamm, Machinations (Verve, 1968)
- Dakota Staton, I Want a Country Man (Groove Merchant, 1973)
- Jeremy Steig, Firefly (CTI, 1977)
- Stanley Turrentine, Always Something There (Blue Note, 1968)
- Cedar Walton, Beyond Mobius (RCA Victor, 1976)
- Michael Zager, Life's a Party (Private Stock, 1979)
