= The Chase Is On =

Studio album by Charlie Rouse and Paul Quinichette
- Released: 1958
- Recorded: August 29 and September 8, 1957; New York City
- Genre: Jazz
- Length: 38:22
- Label: Bethlehem; BCP 6021

Charlie Rouse chronology
The Chase Is On (1958)	Takin' Care of Business (1960)

Paul Quinichette chronology
Cattin' with Coltrane and Quinichette (1957)	The Chase Is On (1957)	For Basie (1957)

The Chase Is On is an album by saxophonists Charlie Rouse and Paul Quinichette recorded in 1957 and released on the Bethlehem label.

== Reception ==
Professional ratings
Review scores
Source	Rating
AllMusic	4/5 stars
The Virgin Encyclopedia of Jazz	3/5 stars

The editors of AllMusic awarded the album 4 stars, and reviewer Michael G. Nastos stated: "The combination of Rouse and Quinichette was a very satisfactory coupling of two talented and promising post-swing to bop individualists, who played to all of their strengths and differences on this worthy -- and now legendary -- session".

A reviewer for Billboard called the album a "smart, stimulating jazz package," featuring "good all-star rhythm backing." They commented: "Eye-catching cover conveys the idea, and tenor fanciers will plunge."

== Track listing ==
1. "The Chase Is On" (Harold Tubbs) - 3:18
2. "When the Blues Come On" (Al Cohn, Charles Isaiah Darwin) - 5:48
3. "This Can't Be Love" (Lorenz Hart, Richard Rodgers) - 5:24
4. "Last Time for Love" (Carmen McRae) - 4:30
5. "You're Cheating Yourself" (Al Hoffman, Dick Manning) - 5:15
6. "Knittin'" (Charlie Rouse) - 6:19
7. "Tender Trap" (Sammy Cahn, Jimmy Van Heusen) - 4:24
8. "The Things I Love" (Harold Barlow, Lew Harris) - 3:24

== Personnel ==
- Charlie Rouse, Paul Quinichette - tenor saxophone
- Hank Jones (tracks 2 & 5), Wynton Kelly (tracks 1, 3, 4 & 6–8) - piano
- Freddie Green - guitar (tracks 2 & 5)
- Wendell Marshall - bass
- Ed Thigpen - drums
