= On the Sunny Side (Paul Quinichette album) =

Studio album by Paul Quinichette
- Released: 1957
- Recorded: May 10, 1957
- Studio: Van Gelder Studio, Hackensack, New Jersey
- Genre: Jazz
- Length: 52:00 CD reissue with bonus track
- Label: Prestige; PR 7103
- Producer: Bob Weinstock

Paul Quinichette chronology
The Kid From Denver (1957)	On the Sunny Side (1957)	Cattin' with Coltrane and Quinichette (1957)

On the Sunny Side is an album by American jazz tenor saxophonist Paul Quinichette featuring tracks recorded in May 1957 and released on the Prestige label.

== Reception ==
Professional ratings
Review scores
Source	Rating
Allmusic	4/5 stars
The Penguin Guide to Jazz Recordings	3/4 stars

Allmusic awarded the album 4 stars with its review by Scott Yanow calling it, "An enjoyable and underrated release".

== Track listing ==
All compositions by Mal Waldron except as indicated

1. "Blue Dots" - 7:54
2. "Circles" - 11:50
3. "On the Sunny Side of the Street" (Jimmy McHugh, Dorothy Fields) - 5:44
4. "Cool-Lypso" - 19:08
5. "My Funny Valentine" (Richard Rodgers, Lorenz Hart) - 7:24 Bonus track on CD reissue

== Personnel ==
- Paul Quinichette - tenor saxophone
- Curtis Fuller - trombone (tracks 1–4)
- Sonny Red (tracks 1–4), John Jenkins (tracks 1 & 3–5) - alto saxophone
- Mal Waldron - piano
- Doug Watkins - bass
- Ed Thigpen - drums
