= Joe Shepley =

American jazz musician

Joseph James Shepley (born in Yonkers, New York on August 7, 1930; March 26, 2016) was an American jazz trumpeter. He worked with Burt Collins, Mike Longo, Duke Pearson and others. He can be heard in the docudrama Pumping Iron.

== Discography ==
With Ron Carter

- Parade (Milestone, 1979)
- Empire Jazz (RSO, 1980)

With Lou Donaldson

- Sweet Lou (Blue Note, 1974)

With O'Donel Levy

- Breeding of Mind (Groove Merchant, 1972)

With Duke Pearson

- It Could Only Happen with You (Blue Note, 1970)

With Lonnie Liston Smith

- Reflections of a Golden Dream (RCA/Flying Dutchman, 1976)

With Kai Winding

- The In Instrumentals (Verve, 1965)
