= Manny Albam =

American musician and composer

- Manny Albam conducting

Background information
- Born: Emmanuel Albam; June 24, 1922; Samana, Dominican Republic
- Died: October 2, 2001 (aged 79) Croton-on-Hudson, New York, United States
- Genres: Jazz, Latin jazz
- Occupations: Musician, arranger
- Instrument: Saxophone
- Label: Solid State
- Formerly of: Buddy Rich, Stan Kenton, Woody Herman

Manny Albam (June 24, 1922 – October 2, 2001) was an American jazz arranger, composer, record producer, saxophonist, and educator.

== Early life ==
A native of the Dominican Republic, Albam grew up in New York City. He was attracted to jazz at an early age when heard the music of Bix Beiderbecke.

== Career ==
He left school in his teens and played saxophone in a Dixieland band led by Muggsy Spanier. When he was with the Georgie Auld band, he learned about arranging with Budd Johnson. By 1950 Albam was concentrating less on performing and more on writing and arranging.

Within a few years, he became known for a bebop style that emphasized taut and witty writing with a flair for distinctive shadings; flute-led reed sections became something of an Albam trademark. One of his most popular works from that era was "Samana", an Afro-Latin composition he did for the Stan Kenton Innovations Orchestra, named after his birthplace Samaná in the Dominican Republic. He worked with bandleaders Charlie Barnet and Charlie Spivak before collaborating with Count Basie, Stan Getz, Bob Brookmeyer, Coleman Hawkins, Dizzy Gillespie, Freddie Hubbard, Hank Jones, Mel Lewis, Art Farmer, Urbie Green, and Milt Hinton.

Albam wrote arrangements for Leonard Bernstein's score for the musical West Side Story in 1957. The work earned him a Grammy Award nomination in 1959. He was invited by Bernstein to write for the New York Philharmonic, and he began to study classical music with Tibor Serly, eventually writing Quintet for Trombone and Strings. He also wrote music for movies, television, and commercials. In the early 1960s he became music director for Solid State Records. For the rest of his career, he taught at Glassboro State College, Eastman School of Music, and Manhattan School of Music. He helped start and lead the BMI Jazz Composers Workshop.

== Personal life and demise ==
He died of cancer in Croton-on-Hudson, New York, aged 79, in 2001.

== Compositions ==
- Quintet for Tuba and Strings

== Discography ==
=== As leader ===
- The Drum Suite (RCA Victor, 1956)
- The Jazz Workshop (RCA Victor, 1956)
- Manny Albam and the Jazz Greats of Our Time Vol. 1 (Coral, 1957)
- Steve's Songs (Dot Records, 1958)
- Jazz Horizons: Jazz New York (Dot Records, 1958)
- Sophisticated Lady (Coral, 1958)
- With All My Love (Mercury, 1958)
- A Gallery of Gershwin (Coral, 1958)
- The Jazz Greats of Our Time Vol. 2 (Coral, 1958)
- The Blues Is Everybody's Business (Coral, 1958)
- Double Exposures (Top Rank, 1960)
- West Side Story (Vocalion, 1960)
- I Had The Craziest Dream (RCA Victor, 1961)
- More Double Exposure (RCA Victor, 1961)
- Jazz Goes to the Movies (Impulse!, 1962)
- Brass on Fire (Solid State, 1966)
- The Soul of the City (Solid State, 1966)

=== As arranger ===
With Count Basie

- Dance Session Album #2 (Clef, 1954)
- Basie (Clef, 1954)

With Kenny Clarke-Francy Boland Big Band

- Latin Kaleidoscope (MPS, 1968)

With Al Cohn

- Mr. Music (RCA Victor, 1955)
- The Natural Seven (RCA Victor, 1955)
- That Old Feeling (RCA Victor, 1955)
- Four Brass One Tenor (RCA Victor, 1955)

With Jose Feliciano

- Jose Feliciano Sings (RCA, 1972)

With Curtis Fuller

- Cabin in the Sky (Impulse!, 1962)

With Freddie Green

- Mr. Rhythm (RCA Victor, 1955)

With Coleman Hawkins

- The Hawk in Paris (Vek, 1956)
- Desafinado (Impulse!, 1962)

With Groove Holmes

- New Groove (Groove Merchant, 1974)

With O'Donel Levy

- Breeding of Mind (Groove Merchant, 1972)
- Dawn of a New Day (Groove Merchant, 1973)
- Simba (Groove Merchant, 1974)

With Jimmy McGriff

- The Big Band (Solid State, 1966)
- A Bag Full of Blues (Solid State, 1967)

With Joe Newman

- Salute to Satch (RCA Victor, 1956)
- I Feel Like a Newman (Storyville, 1956)

With Freda Payne

- After the Lights Go Down Low and Much More!!! (Impulse!, 1964)

With Oscar Peterson

- With Respect to Nat (Verve, 1965)

With Buddy Rich

- The Roar of '74 (RCA, 1974)

With Zoot Sims

- New Beat Bossa Nova (Colpix, 1962)

With Dakota Staton

- I Want a Country Man (Groove Merchant, 1973)

With Eddie "Cleanhead" Vinson

- Clean Head's Back in Town (Bethlehem, 1957)

With Dionne Warwick

- Dionne Warwick in Valley of the Dolls (Scepter, 1968)

== See also ==
- List of Jazz Arrangers
