= Turk Van Lake =

American jazz musician

Vanig Rupen Hovsepian (June 15, 1918 – September 1, 2002), better known as Turk Van Lake, was an American arranger, composer and jazz guitarist.

Born in Boston, he studied composition at the Boston Conservatory and went on to play with Charlie Barnet, Lionel Hampton, Buddy Rich, Sarah Vaughan, and with the Benny Goodman Orchestra.

In the 1950s he wrote for Metronome magazine.

Until his retirement in 1993, he was as an adjunct music professor at the College of Staten Island. Van Lake was the first guitar teacher of Reeves Gabrels, the lead guitarist for David Bowie's backing band, Tin Machine.

== Discography ==
=== As sideman ===
- Georgie Auld, Handicap (Musicraft, 1990)
- Charlie Barnet, Sky Liner (MCA, 1976)
- Terry Gibbs, Swingin' with Terry Gibbs and His Orchestra (EmArcy, 1956)
- Terry Gibbs, Vibes On Velvet (EmArcy, 1956)
- Benny Goodman, Happy Session (Columbia/CBS, 1959)
- Herbie Mann, Herbie Mann Plays The Roar of the Greasepaint – The Smell of the Crowd (Atlantic, 1965)
- Big Miller, Did You Ever Hear the Blues? (United Artists, 1959)
- Sarah Vaughan, In the Land of Hi-Fi (EmArcy, 1956)
- Eddie "Cleanhead" Vinson, Clean Head's Back in Town (Bethlehem, 1957)
