= Chester Thompson =

American drummer (born 1948)

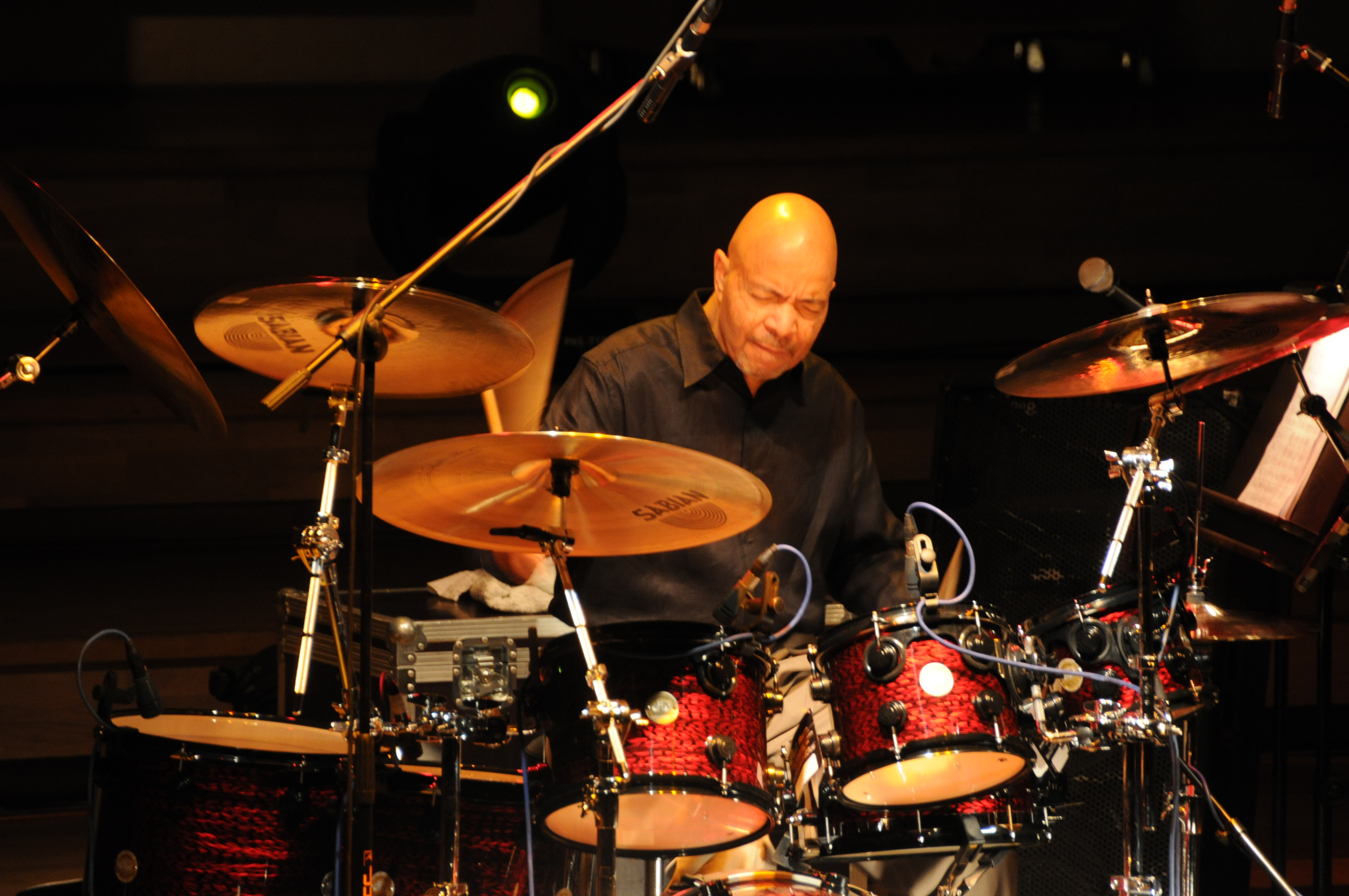
- Thompson drumming in 2008

Background information
- Born: Chester Thompson; December 11, 1948 (age 77); Baltimore, Maryland, U.S.
- Genres: Progressive rock; pop rock; jazz fusion
- Occupation: Drummer
- Years active: 1970–present
- Member of: Chester Thompson Trio
- Formerly of: The Mothers of Invention; Weather Report; Steve Hackett; Santana; Era
- Website: chesterthompson.com

Chester Thompson (born December 11, 1948) is an American drummer best known for his tenures with Frank Zappa and the Mothers of Invention, Weather Report, Santana, Genesis, and Phil Collins. Thompson has performed with his jazz group, the Chester Thompson Trio, since 2011.

== Early life ==
Thompson was born on December 11, 1948, in Baltimore, Maryland. He has an older brother, who was a musician in drum corps. At elementary school, he learned to play the flute and read music. At eleven, Thompson took up the drums, receiving lessons from James Harrison, a professional jazz drummer from whom he learned his rudiments. Thompson practiced by playing along with albums by jazz musicians Miles Davis, Max Roach and Art Blakey. From there, he moved on to studying records by drummer Elvin Jones, whom Thompson cited as a major musical influence, along with Tony Williams.

While attending high school, he studied privately with drummer and percussionist Tony Ames of the National Symphony Orchestra for one semester. Thompson's practice focused on mastering drumming rudiments using a book published by the National Association of Rudimental Drummers. He started to play his first live gigs two years later in local venues. Still underage, Thompson went as far as to draw a moustache on his upper lip using an eyebrow pencil "because the club owners were worried about me playing there". He played as many as three jam sessions a week.

== Career ==
=== 1970–1976: Early bands, Frank Zappa, and Weather Report ===
Among his first major jobs was a short tour, mainly across Canada, with singer Ben E. King. In 1970, he played with organist Jack McDuff, followed by gigs with other local groups, including time in Boston with keyboardist Webster Lewis. In 1971, Thompson returned to Baltimore and studied music at the Community College of Baltimore County for two years, where he learned the flute and coached a basketball team at the Rec Center. He played as part of the house band in a club that supported visiting soul artists. Thompson built a reputation as a session drummer. One of his first bands was Doc "Soul Stirrer" Young and the We Four Trio. Since the early 1970s, Thompson has played with the jazz rock band Air Pocket, a band with the Fowler Brothers at its core.

In 1973, shortly before Thompson was to start a four-year course at another music school, he had auditioned to join Frank Zappa and the Mothers of Invention and won the position. He was a friend of their tour manager, Marty Perellis, also of Baltimore, and landed an audition in Los Angeles after learning of Zappa's wish to use two drummers in his group. Thompson recalled the audition involved him jamming with the band for a solid hour without a break. "We just drifted in and out of so many different kinds of feels and grooves." His time in Zappa's band was challenging because of the leader's "incredibly difficult music" which involved as much as 40 hours of weekly practice for four to six weeks before a tour. Thompson played on several Zappa albums, including Roxy & Elsewhere (1974), One Size Fits All (1975), Studio Tan (1978), Sleep Dirt (1979), and You Can't Do That on Stage Anymore, Vol. 2 (1988).

In 1975, Thompson left Zappa after he had cancelled an upcoming Australian tour. Upon returning to Los Angeles Thompson met Weather Report bassist Alphonso Johnson, who suggested he jam with the band as they sought a new drummer, following the departure of Leon "Ndugu" Chancler. Despite Thompson not wanting to audition, the group had considered Woody Theus but they chose Thompson for the spot. Thompson recalled his time in the band as a "major knock out" because he was a big fan. After playing on Black Market (1976), he left.

After leaving Weather Report, Thompson played recording sessions in Los Angeles as well as part of the San Francisco Broadway theatre production of The Wiz. He was recommended for the gig by his friend Roy McCurdy, and it was there where he met his future wife who had parts in the musical. He also toured as a member of the live band for the Pointer Sisters, and rehearsed with Santana after they expressed an interest in having Thompson join the band.

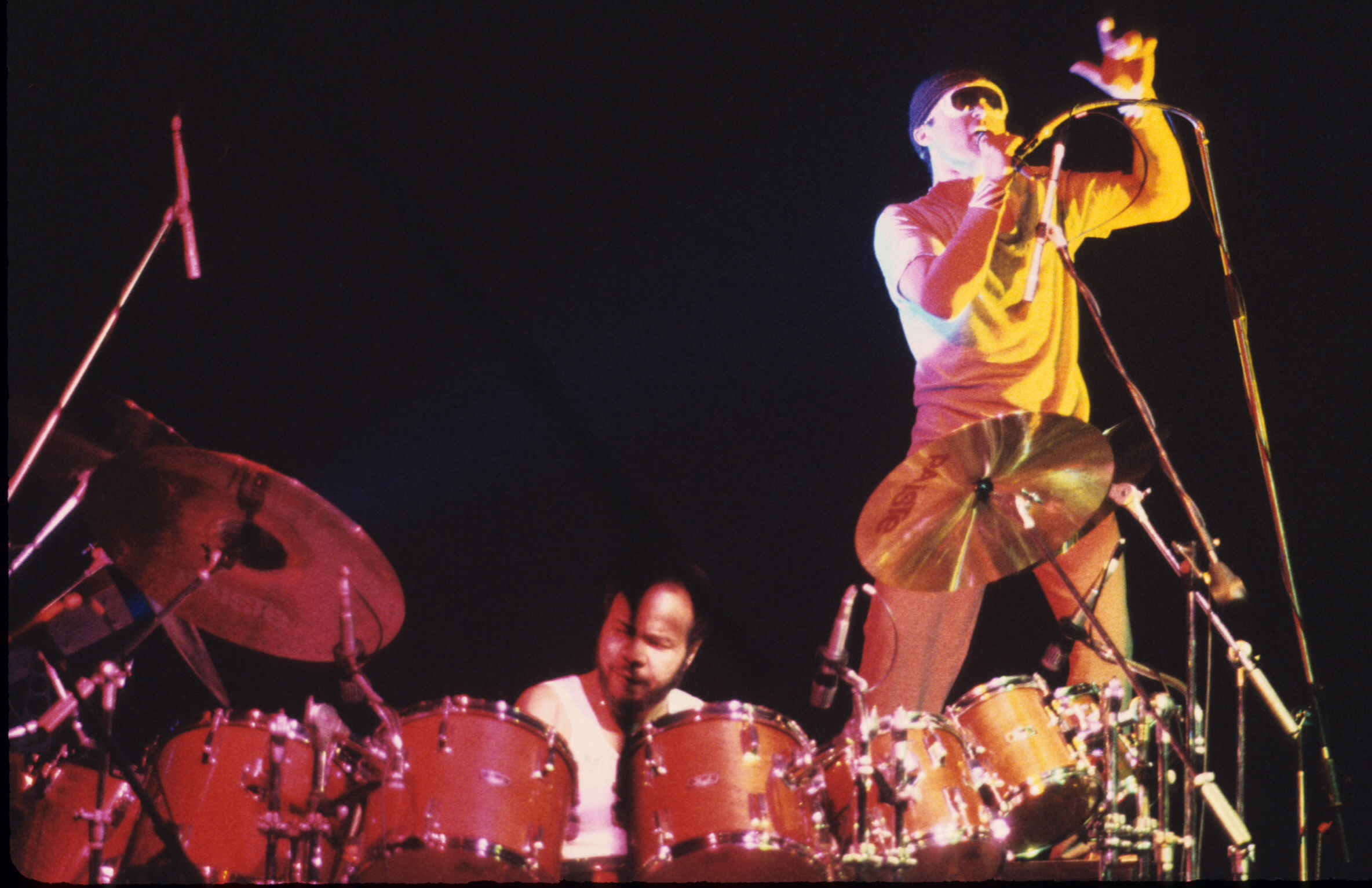
Thompson and Collins in 1981

=== 1976–1992, 2007: Genesis ===
Shortly after rehearsals with Santana began, Genesis drummer and singer Phil Collins invited Thompson to join the band as their touring drummer, replacing Bill Bruford, who wished to move on after one tour. Collins wanted an American drummer for the spot, and heard Thompson's playing on Roxy & Elsewhere, which featured Thompson playing in tandem with drummer Ralph Humphrey. Thompson had heard of Genesis's music from Johnson, and agreed to join the band for rehearsals in late 1976 for their upcoming tour supporting Wind & Wuthering (1976). He recalled: "The first day of rehearsal, we just started jamming as everybody was setting up gear, we were just going for it". Thompson looked back on his time joining Genesis as "the biggest adjustment I've ever had to make, musically and culturally."

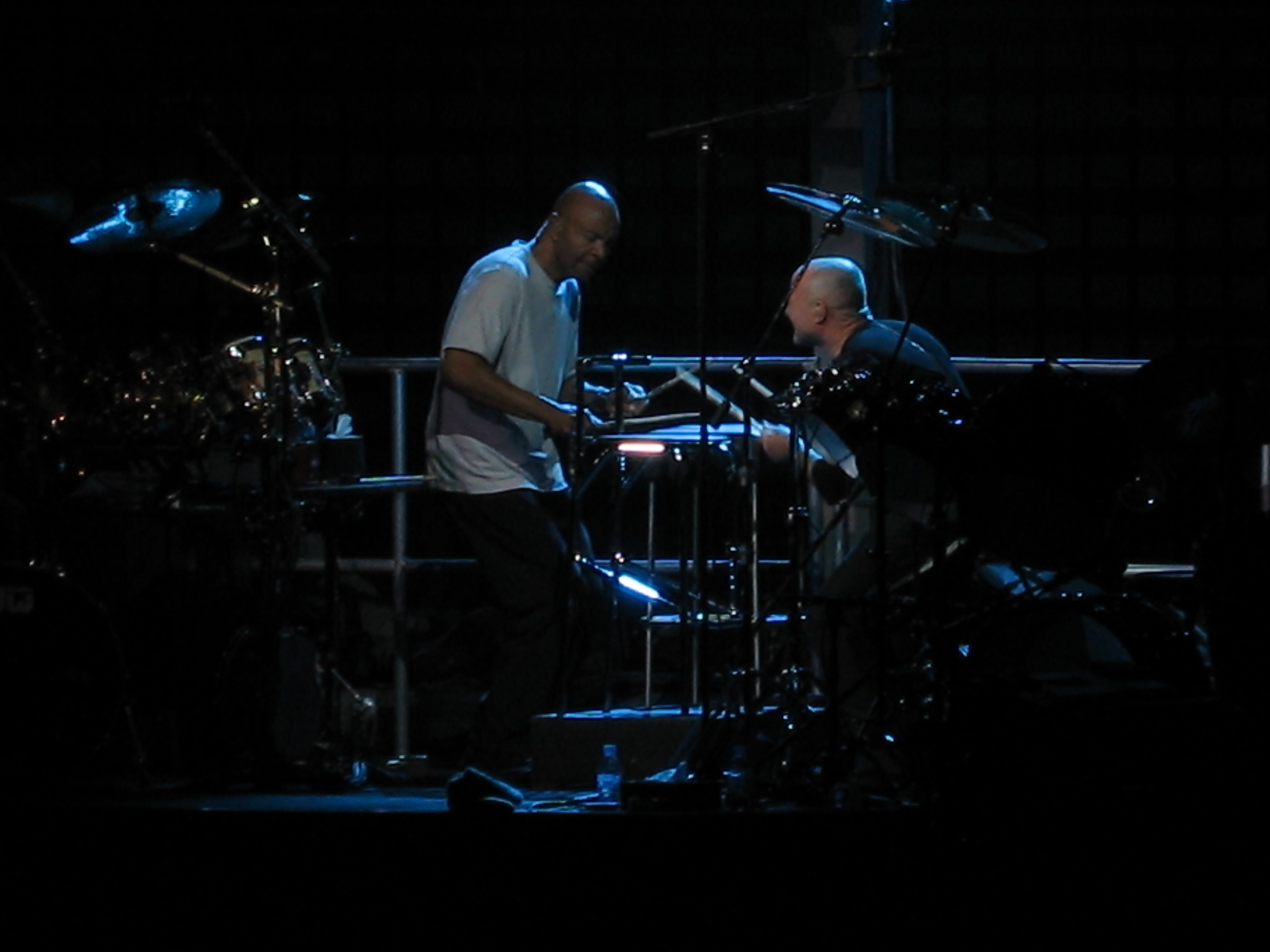
Thompson and Collins during a drum duet in 2007

Thompson performed with Genesis on every tour between 1977 and 1992, and once more for their Turn It On Again: The Tour in 2007. He is featured on the live albums Seconds Out (1977), Three Sides Live (1982), The Way We Walk, Volume One: The Shorts (1992), The Way We Walk, Volume Two: The Longs (1993), and Live over Europe 2007 (2007). After the 1992 tour, Thompson stepped down in order to spend more time with his family. He talked with bassist/guitarist Mike Rutherford about the possibility of playing the drums on their final studio album, Calling All Stations (1997), but as Collins had left the band, Thompson wanted to become a full-time member and not continue as a side man. Genesis continued without Thompson (and without an official permanent drummer) for the album and tour.

=== Other work ===
==== 1980s ====
In addition to Genesis, Thompson was also the touring drummer for Collins's solo tours between 1982 and 2005. He featured on the live release Serious Hits... Live! (1990).

In 1986, Thompson played the drums on "The Next Time I Fall". The soft rock duet between Peter Cetera and Amy Grant hit number one on the Billboard Hot 100 chart.

In 1988, Thompson was invited to play for what turned out to be Zappa's final concert tour before his death. Thompson declined the offer as by this time, he had become a devout Christian and Zappa's anti-religious sentiments and lyrics conflicted with his beliefs.

In 1989, Thompson worked as the drummer for the Bee Gees for their One for All World Tour in support for One (1989). He was replaced by Michael Murphy.

He was also a founding member of the band Fire Merchants with Brand X guitarist John Goodsall and bassist Doug Lunn and appeared on their first eponymous recording in 1989. Thompson played drums with Santana in 1984 and is credited in the Beyond Appearances album along with Chester D. Thompson on keyboards.

==== 1990s ====
Thompson continued to work with other members of Genesis on their solo projects. He played on Tony Banks's solo album A Curious Feeling (1979).

In 1992, Thompson and his family relocated to Nashville, Tennessee, after liking the area when they visited to attend noted drummer Larrie Londin's funeral. He has since played on sessions for various artists in the area, mainly in jazz, pop, and Christian music.

Having played on the former Genesis guitarist Steve Hackett's album Please Don't Touch (1978), Hackett invited Thompson in 1995 to play on his album Genesis Revisited. He was unsure of playing on all of the tracks as initially discussed, and said "we both thought it would be too weird to do the whole album with both of us being sort of ex-Genesis people". Instead, Hackett brought on additional musicians and Thompson played on just three tracks. He also appears on Hackett's live album The Tokyo Tapes (1998), which also features John Wetton, Ian McDonald, and Julian Colbeck.

In the late 1990s, Thompson began touring with jazz guitarist Denny Jiosa. In 1999, he released his first solo album, A Joyful Noise. In 2001, Thompson toured Korea with singer and worship leader Ron Kenoly. In January 2002, Thompson performed at the debut charity gig by Collins's Little Dreams Foundation.

Thompson has taught drums at Belmont University in Nashville since 1998, and has also taken classes at the university in composition and arranging. In 2008, he was "two classes away" from earning a degree. He is an adjunct instructor at its school of music.

==== 2000s–present ====
In 2008, Thompson was honoured with a Lifetime Achievement Award at the 32nd Percussive Arts Society International Convention (PASIC).

Thompson's professional association with Collins ended in 2010, when tensions grew over Collins's dissatisfaction with Thompson's drumming during the Going Back tour. Thompson said that he had not spoken to Collins since: "I was pretty upset. But I'm over it now. I wish him nothing but the best." He also had praise for Collins's son, Nic Collins, Thompson's successor as drummer for both Collins's comeback solo tour in 2017-2019 and Genesis's 2021 farewell tour. As a child, Collins had travelled with Genesis during their 2007 tour, with Thompson later remarking, "We knew at five or six years old that this kid was going to be a monster. I think it’s fantastic that he got to play with his dad.”

In 2011, Thompson formed his jazz group, the Chester Thompson Trio, with pianist Joe Davidian and bassist Mike Rinne. They had initially played together as part of the rhythm section of the Nashville Trombone Festival which was followed by a weekly residency at the Commodore Lounge for over a year. They have released two albums: Approved (2013) and Simpler Times (2015).

In 2021, Thompson said he no longer teaches drumming at a university, but continues giving private lessons to pupils at a school.

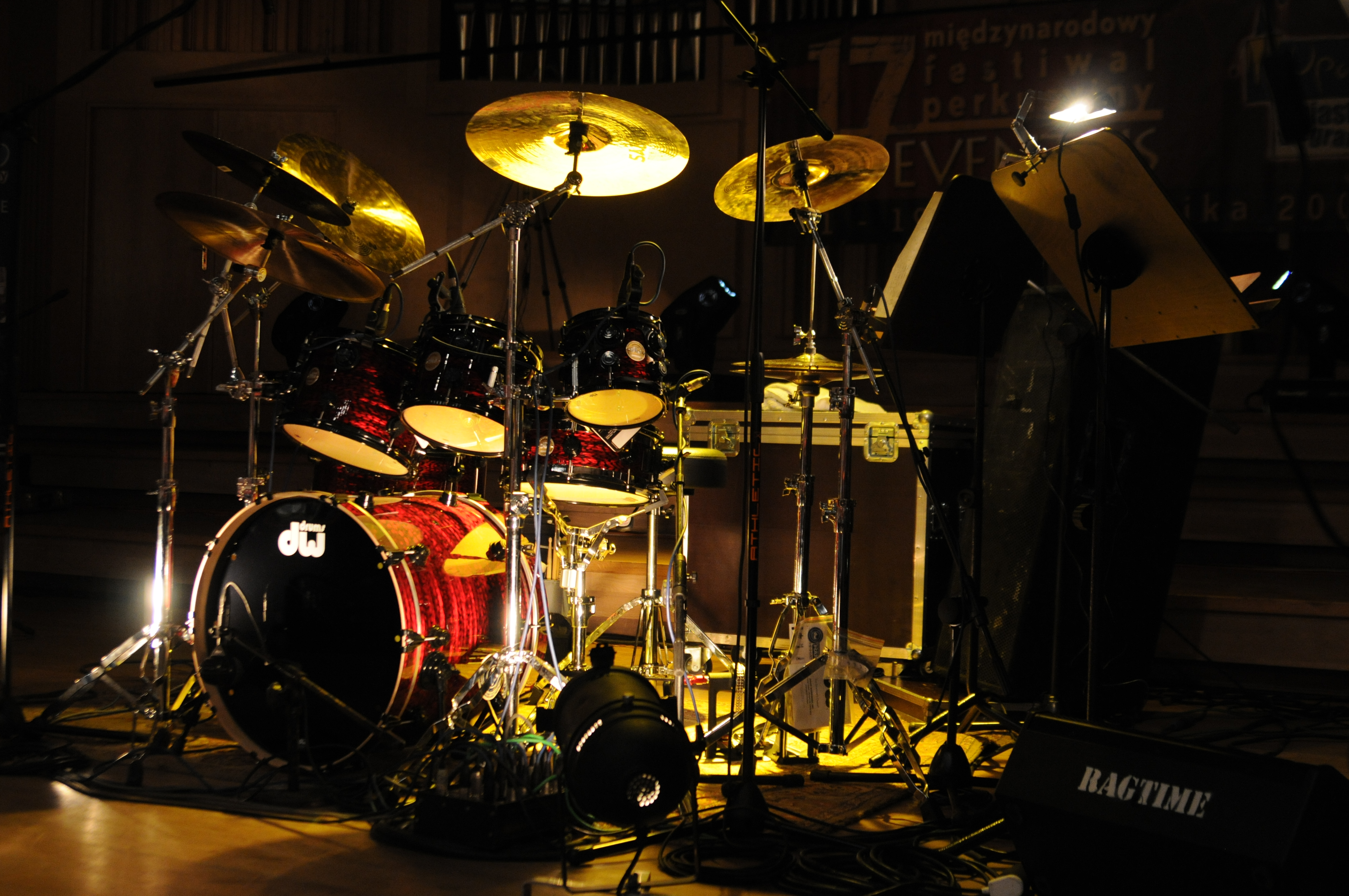
Thompsons drums in 2008

In 2025 it was announced Thompson would be teaming up with Neal Morse, Phil Keaggy, and Byron House in a new band called Cosmic Cathedral. Their first song was released in February, with the album Deep Water released in April.

== Gear ==
Thompson has endorsed Ludwig Drums (1970–March, 1977), Pearl Drums (April, 1977 – July, 1987), DW Drums (2000-2024), Craviotto Drums (2024-2026}, and Paiste cymbals (1970–1990); he has endorsed Sonor Drums since 2026, endorsing them as well from 1990 to 1999. He has also endorsed Sabian Cymbals since 1990. He uses Remo drumheads, Meinl Percussion, Gibraltar racks and Innovative Percussion Drumsticks. He previously had his own Regal Tip Chester Thompson signature drumstick.

== Personal life ==
Thompson met his wife during his time playing in The Wiz in 1976. They have a son, Akil.

In 1980, Thompson became a Christian. He later became an Elder in the Nashville Church on the Way.

== Selected discography ==
=== Solo ===
- A Joyful Noise (1991)
- Steppin (2019)
- Wake-Up Call (2023)

=== Chester Thompson Trio ===
- Approved (2013)
- Simpler Times (2015)

=== As a member ===
Air Pocket

- Fly On (1975)
- Hunter (1985)
- Breakfast for Dinosaurs (1988)

Caldera

- Sky Islands (Capitol, 1977)

Fire Merchants

- Fire Merchants (Medusa, 1989)

Genesis

- Seconds Out (Charisma/Atlantic, 1977)
- Three Sides Live (Charisma/Atlantic, 1982)
- The Way We Walk, Vol I: The Shorts (1992)
- The Way We Walk, Vol II: The Longs (1993)
- Live over Europe 2007 (2007)
- BBC Broadcasts (2023)

High Inergy

- High Inergy (Gordy, 1981)

Santana

- Beyond Appearances (Columbia, 1985) – rec. 1984
- Sentient (Blues for Salvador, keyboards) (Candid rec., 2025)

Weather Report

- Black Market (Columbia, 1976)

=== As sideman ===
With Phil Collins

- Serious Hits... Live! (Atlantic, 1990) – live
- Finally, The First Farewell Tour (Warner Music Vision, 2004)[2DVD-Video]

With Steve Hackett

- Please Don't Touch! (1978)
- Watcher of the Skies: Genesis Revisited (1996)
- The Tokyo Tapes (1998)

With O'Donel Levy

- Black Velvet (1971)
- Breeding of Mind (1972)
- Dawn of a New Day (1973)
- Hands of Fire (1974)[2LP] – compilation

With Frank Zappa / Beefheart / Mothers of Invention

- Roxy & Elsewhere (1974)
- One Size Fits All (1975)
- Bongo Fury (1975)
- Studio Tan (1978) – rec. 1969, 1974–76
- Sleep Dirt (1979) – rec. 1974 & 76
- You Can't Do That on Stage Anymore, Vol. 2 (1988) – rec. 1974

With others

- Tony Banks, A Curious Feeling (1979)
- Chris Catena, Freak Out (2004)
- Linda Clifford, Let Me Be Your Woman (1979)
- Michel Colombier, Old Fool Back on Earth (1983)
- Cosmos & Their L.A. Friends, Session V (1985)
- Brenda Holloway, Brand New! (1980)
- Freddie Hubbard, The Love Connection (1979)
- Leroy Hutson, Unforgettable (1979)
- Ahmad Jamal, Night Song (1980)
- Johnny Lytle/Albert Dailey/Chester Thompson, I Giganti Del Jazz Vol. 93 (1982)
- Alphonso Johnson, Yesterday's Dreams (1976)
- Hidehiko Matsumoto, Prediction (1980)
- Bingo Miki & His Inner Galaxy Orchestra of America, Mystic Solar Dance (1981)
- Flora Purim, Everyday, Everynight (1978)
- David Pritchard, City Dreams (1979)
- Stefano Sabatini, Sabatini (1982)
