= Cherry Red (album) =

Studio album by Eddie "Cleanhead" Vinson
- Released: 1967
- Recorded: March 1967
- Studio: New York City
- Genre: Blues
- Length: 31:47
- Label: BluesWay; BL/BLS-6007
- Producer: Bob Thiele

Eddie "Cleanhead" Vinson chronology
Back Door Blues (1962)	Cherry Red (1967)	Kidney Stew Is Fine (1969)

Cherry Red is an album by the American saxophonist/vocalist Eddie "Cleanhead" Vinson recorded in New York in 1967 and released by the BluesWay label.

Professional ratings
Review scores
Source	Rating
Allmusic	4/5 stars

== Track listing ==
All compositions by Eddie "Cleanhead" Vinson and Louis Zito except where noted

1. "Cherry Red" (Pete Johnson, Big Joe Turner) − 3:09
2. "Cadillac Blues" (George David Weiss, George Douglas) − 2:59
3. "Juice Head Baby" − 3:08
4. "Alimony Blues" − 3:27
5. "Somebody's Gotta Go" (Big Bill Broonzy) − 3:03
6. "Flat Broke Blues" (Weiss, Douglas) − 2:26
7. "Old Maid Got Married" (Vinson, Milt Larkin, D. Timberlake) − 2:43
8. "Workin' Blues" (Duke Ellington, Don George) − 2:50
9. "Wee Baby Blues" (Johnson, Turner) − 3:00
10. "Goodnight Baby Blues" − 5:02

== Personnel ==
- Eddie "Cleanhead" Vinson − alto saxophone, vocals
- Buddy Lucas − tenor saxophone, harmonica
- Mike Bloomfield − guitar
- Patti Bown − piano, organ
- Unidentified musicians − guitar, bass, drums
