= Disorder at the Border =

Live album by Coleman Hawkins
- Released: 1973
- Recorded: September 6 and 13, 1952
- Venue: Birdland, NYC
- Genre: Jazz
- Length: 43:45
- Label: Spotlite; SPJ 121

Coleman Hawkins chronology
Norman Granz' Jazz Concert (1950)	Disorder at the Border (1973)	The Hawk Talks (1955)

Disorder at the Border is a live album by saxophonist Coleman Hawkins compiling tracks which were originally broadcast in 1952 and first released on LP in 1973 on the UK Spotlite label.

== Reception ==
Professional ratings
Review scores
Source	Rating
AllMusic	3/5 stars

On AllMusic, Scott Yanow called it an "erratically recorded but very interesting release" and states, "Although Hawkins's studio recordings from this era were few and generally found him restricted to playing commercial mood music, his concert and club appearances showed him to still be in prime form. This enjoyable LP has the great tenor leading two different quintets at Birdland on broadcasts that were aired just a week apart. The rhythm section features the then-unknown pianist Horace Silver, bassist Curly Russell and either Art Blakey or Connie Kay on drums. More importantly, trumpeters Roy Eldridge and Howard McGhee (heard separately) inspire the competitive Hawkins to play at his best".

== Track listing ==
All compositions by Coleman Hawkins except where noted

1. "Disorder at the Border" – 6:55
2. "The Blue Room" – 6:55
3. "Stuffy" – 7:00
4. "Rifftide" – 5:50
5. "I Can't Get Started" (Vernon Duke, Ira Gershwin) – 4:10
6. "Disorder at the Border" – 5:05
7. The Hawk Talks (Interview) – 7:50
- Recorded at Birdland in New York City on September 6, 1952 (tracks 4–6) and September 13, 1952 (tracks 1–3), and in London, England on an unknown date c. 1960 (track 7)

== Personnel ==
- Coleman Hawkins – tenor saxophone
- Roy Eldridge (tracks 1–3), Howard McGhee (tracks 4–6) – trumpet
- Horace Silver – piano
- Curley Russell – bass
- Art Blakey (tracks 1–3), Connie Kay (tracks 4–6) – drums
