= The Hawk Talks =

Studio album by Coleman Hawkins
- Released: 1955
- Recorded: January 31, February 26 & July 30, 1952, and April 27, 1953
- Studios: NYC and Chicago, IL
- Genre: Jazz
- Length: 35:14
- Labels: Decca; DL 8127

Coleman Hawkins chronology
Disorder at the Border (1952)	The Hawk Talks (1955)	The Hawk Returns (1955)

The Hawk Talks is an album by saxophonist Coleman Hawkins compiling tracks recorded between 1952 and 1953 for the Decca label which were first released on LP in 1955.

== Reception ==
Professional ratings
Review scores
Source	Rating
AllMusic	2/5 stars

On AllMusic, Scott Yanow states, "The early '50s were an "off" period for Hawkins. He had not gone through a decline in the slightest, but, due to the change in the public's (and critics') taste, his talents were being a bit underrated. By 1957 Hawkins would be on top again, but the 1951-53 recordings included on this LP find him mostly restricted to making romantic melody statements on indifferent material, mood music that it was hoped would sell much better than it eventually did".

== Track listing ==
1. "Lucky Duck" (Neal Hefti) – 2:50
2. "Spellbound" (Miklós Rózsa, Mack David) – 3:07
3. "I Can't Get Started" (Vernon Duke, Ira Gershwin) – 2:57
4. "Lonely Wine" (Roy Wells) – 3:15
5. "Ruby" Theme Melody from the Motion Picture Ruby Gentry (Heinz Roemheld, Mitchell Parish) – 2:28
6. "Trust in Me" (Ned Wever, Milton Ager, Jean Schwartz) – 3:06
7. "If I Could Be With You (One Hour Tonight)" (James P. Johnson, Henry Creamer) – 3:15
8. "The Song from Moulin Rouge (Where Is Your Heart)" (Georges Auric, William Engvick) – 3:00
9. "Midnight Sun" (Lionel Hampton, Sonny Burke) – 2:57
10. "Amber" (Jean McKenna) – 2:45
11. "Lost in a Fog" (Jimmy McHugh, Dorothy Fields) – 3:06
12. "Carioca" (Vincent Youmans, Edward Eliscu, Gus Kahn) – 2:28
- Recorded in Chicago on July 30, 1952 (tracks 3 & 7) and in New York City on January 31, 1952 (tracks 2 & 10–12), February 26, 1952 (tracks 4, 6 & 9), and April 27, 1953 (tracks 1, 5 & 8)

== Personnel ==
- Coleman Hawkins – tenor saxophone
- with orchestra directed by Paul Neilson (tracks 1, 5 & 8)
  - Neal Hefti – arranger
  - Candido – congas
- with orchestra arranged and conducted by Danny Mendelsohn (2, 4, 6 & 9–12)
  - Sanford Gold – piano (2 & 10–12 only)
  - Al Casamenti – guitar (2 & 10–12 only)
  - Joe Wilder – trumpet (4, 6 & 9 only)
  - Danny Bank – baritone saxophone (4, 6 & 9 only)
  - Bill Doggett – piano, organ (4, 6 & 9 only)
  - Sam Makia – steel guitar (4, 6 & 9 only)
  - Trigger Alpert – bass
  - Norris Shawker (2 & 10–12), Jimmy Crawford (4, 6 & 9) – drums
- George Barnes – guitar (3 & 7)
