= Live at Sandy's (Eddie Vinson album) =

Live album by Eddie "Cleanhead" Vinson and the Muse Allstars
- Released: 1981
- Recorded: August 25–26, 1978
- Venue: Sandy's Jazz Revival, Beverley, MA
- Genre: Jazz
- Length: 39:59
- Label: Muse; MR 5224
- Producer: Bob Porter

Eddie "Cleanhead" Vinson chronology
The "Clean" Machine (1978)	Live at Sandy's (1981)	Hold It Right There! (1984)

Live at Sandy's is a live album by saxophonist/vocalist Eddie "Cleanhead" Vinson which was recorded at Sandy's Jazz Revival in 1978 and released on the Muse label in 1981.

== Reception ==
Professional ratings
Review scores
Source	Rating
AllMusic	3/5 stars

The AllMusic review by Scott Yanow stated "Muse recorded six albums during one week at Sandy's Jazz Revival, a club in Beverly, MA; two of them (this one and Hold It Right There) feature the blues vocals and alto solos of Eddie "Cleanhead" Vinson. Some of the songs also have the tenors of Arnett Cobb and Buddy Tate in a supporting role but this album is largely Vinson's show. Backed by a superb rhythm section, Vinson takes four fine vocals and plays many swinging alto solos".

== Track listing ==
All compositions by Eddie Vinson except where noted

1. "Cleanhead Blues" – 5:29
2. "Tune Up" (Miles Davis) – 4:49
3. "High Class Baby" – 8:38
4. "Railroad Porter Blues" (Jessie Mae Robinson) – 4:05
5. "My Man Sandy" – 8:48
6. "Things Ain't What They Used to Be" (Mercer Ellington, Ted Persons) – 8:10

== Personnel ==
- Eddie "Cleanhead" Vinson – alto saxophone, vocals
- Arnett Cobb, Buddy Tate - tenor saxophone
- Ray Bryant – piano
- George Duvivier – bass
- Alan Dawson – drums
