= Mr. Music (album) =

Studio album by Al Cohn and His Orchestra
- Released: 1955
- Recorded: December 22 & 23, 1954; New York City
- Genre: Jazz
- Length: 38:40
- Label: RCA Victor; LJM 1024

Al Cohn chronology
East Coast-West Coast Scene (1954)	Mr. Music (1955)	The Natural Seven (1955)

Mr. Music is an album by saxophonist and arranger Al Cohn recorded in late 1954 for the RCA Victor label.

== Reception ==
Professional ratings
Review scores
Source	Rating
Allmusic	2/5 stars

Allmusic awarded the album 2 stars.

== Track listing ==
1. "Something for Lisa" (Al Cohn) – 6:29
2. "Count Every Star" (Bruno Coquatrix, Sammy Gallop) – 3:09
3. "Cabin in the Sky" (Vernon Duke, John La Touche) – 3:06
4. "Move" (Denzil Best) – 7:19
5. "Never Never Land" (Jule Styne, Betty Comden, Adolph Green) – 5:30
6. "La Ronde" (Oscar Straus, Dorcas Cochran) – 2:47
7. "This Reminds Me of You" (Ralph Burns) – 3:16
8. "Breakfast with Joe" (Johnny Carisi) – 4:09
9. "Cohn My Way" (Manny Albam) – 2:55

== Personnel ==
- Al Cohn – tenor saxophone
- Joe Newman – trumpet
- Billy Byers, Frank Rehak (tracks 1, 2 & 4–6) – trombone
- Hal McKusick (tracks 1, 2 & 4–6), Gene Quill – alto saxophone
- Sol Schlinger – baritone saxophone
- Sanford Gold – piano
- Billy Bauer (tracks 4 & 5), Sir Osbert Haberdasher (pseudonym for Jimmy Raney, tracks 1, 2 & 6) – guitar
- Buddy Jones (tracks 3 & 7–9), Milt Hinton (tracks 1, 2 & 4–6) – bass
- Osie Johnson – drums
- Manny Albam (track 9), Ralph Burns (track 7), Johnny Carisi (track 8), Al Cohn (tracks 1–6) – arranger
