= Back Door Blues =

Studio album by Eddie "Cleanhead" Vinson with the Cannonball Adderley Quintet
- Released: 1962
- Recorded: September 19, 1961 and February 14, 1962
- Studio: Ter-Mar (Chicago); Bell Sound (New York City)
- Genre: Blues, jazz
- Length: 36:59
- Label: Riverside; RLP 3502
- Producer: Julian Adderley, Orrin Keepnews

Eddie "Cleanhead" Vinson chronology
Clean Head's Back in Town (1957)	Back Door Blues (1962)	Cherry Red (1967)

Cannonball Adderley chronology
The Cannonball Adderley Sextet in New York (1961)	Back Door Blues (1962)	Cannonball in Europe! (1962)

Back Door Blues is an album by the American saxophonist/vocalist Eddie "Cleanhead" Vinson with the Cannonball Adderley Quintet recorded in Chicago in late 1961 and New York in early 1962 and released by the Riverside label. The album was partially rereleased with additional recordings and alternate takes as Cleanhead & Cannonball on CD by Landmark Records in 1988 and the complete recordings issued on Fresh Sound in 2013.

== Reception ==
Professional ratings
Review scores
Source	Rating
AllMusic	4.5/5 stars
The Penguin Guide to Blues Recordings	3/4 stars

AllMusic reviewer Thom Jurek stated: "Cleanhead sings his ass off and plays some alto with Cannonball. These dates reveal an anomaly in jazz at the time: The recordings are the place on the map where jazz and R&B meet head on, bringing the full force of their respective traditions and neither giving an inch. And it works so well ... Cannonball is excellent throughout; the R&B and blues idioms are all meat and potatoes for him, and he feels confident settling inside the groove without the need to push the boundary. Ironically, it's Vinson who compensates in that way. And the anchor in all of this is Zawinul, leading the rhythm section, condensing both musics to their most essential harmonics and tonalities, and building them out with a swinging style and cadence that are nothing short of remarkable ... Highly recommended". The Penguin Guide to Blues Recordings wrote that "the Adderley band of that period was very well suited to accompanying a blues singer like Vinson, and its approach is an elegant alternative to the jump-blues setting of his earlier recordings".

== Track listing ==
All compositions by Eddie "Cleanhead" Vinson except where noted

1. "Bright Lights, Big City" (Jimmy Reed) − 2:14
2. "This Time" (Vinson, Ollie Jones) − 2:32
3. "Hold It" − 4:15 Edited to 2:23 on original LP
4. "Arriving Soon" − 6:27
5. "Kidney Stew" (Vinson, Leona Blackman) − 4:15
6. "Back Door Blues" − 2:16
7. "Person to Person" − 2:44
8. "Just a Dream" (Big Bill Broonzy) − 2:59
9. "Audrey" − 4:41
10. "Vinsonology" − 3:59
11. "Cannonizing" − 6:28 Additional track on CD reissue
12. "Bernices Bounce" − 6:18 Additional track on CD reissue
13. "Kidney Stew" [Alternate Take #3] − 4:13 Additional track on CD reissue
14. "Back Door Blues" [Alternate Take Unedited] − 3:33 Additional track on CD reissue
15. "Vinsonology" [Alternate Take #2] − 4:03 Additional track on CD reissue
- Recorded on September 19, 1961, at Ter Mar Studios, Chicago (tracks 3–6 & 9–15) and February 14, 1962, at Bell Sound Studios, New York City (tracks 1, 2, 7 & 8)

== Personnel ==
- Eddie "Cleanhead" Vinson − alto saxophone, vocals
- Cannonball Adderley − alto saxophone
- Nat Adderley − cornet
- Joe Zawinul − piano
- Sam Jones − bass
- Louis Hayes – drums
