= Moods (Paul Quinichette album) =

Studio album by Paul Quinichette
- Released: 1955
- Recorded: November 4 & 22, 1954; Fine Sound Studios, New York City
- Genre: Jazz
- Length: 40:40
- Label: EmArcy MG 36003
- Producer: (not stated)

Paul Quinichette chronology
Blow Your Horn (1953-54)	Moods (1955)	The Kid from Denver (1957)

Moods (also referred to as Moods Featuring Paul Quinichette) is the 1954 debut album by American jazz saxophonist Paul Quinichette featuring compositions and arrangements by Quincy Jones released on the EmArcy label. The tracks were recorded on two session dates in November 1954 with two different line-ups, an (almost) regular jazz sextet with flutist Sam Most as second horn player and two guitarists. The second session featured an Afro-Cuban combo with Herbie Mann on flute and also on tenor saxophone and Latin percussion instead of a drum set. The difference between the two sessions was preserved in splitting the album with the later recorded Latin jazz session on the LP's A-side, the more straight ahead approach on the other.

== Reception ==
Professional ratings
Review scores
Source	Rating
Allmusic	3/5 stars

Allmusic awarded the album 3 stars with its review by Scott Yanow stating, "The mixture of straight-ahead and Afro-Cuban jazz works quite well".

== Track listing ==
All compositions by Quincy Jones except as indicated

1. "Tropical Intrigue" - 3:04
2. "Grasshopper" - 4:02
3. "Dilemma Diablo" - 4:03
4. "I Can't Believe That You're in Love with Me" (Jimmy McHugh, Clarence Gaskill) - 6:44
5. "Plush Life" - 7:48
6. "You're Crying" - 3:13
7. "Shorty Georgie" (Harry Edison, Count Basie) - 6:33
8. "Pablo's Roonie" - 4:53
- Recorded at Fine Sound Studios, New York City on November 4 (tracks 5–8) and November 22 (tracks 1–4), 1954

== Personnel ==
- Quincy Jones - arranger for all tracks

Tracks 1–4 (Side A of original LP)

- Paul Quinichette - tenor saxophone
- Herbie Mann - flute, tenor saxophone
- Jimmy Jones - piano
- Al Hall - bass
- Tommy Lopez - congas
- Manny Oquendo - bongos
- Willie Rodriguez - timbales

Tracks 5–8 (Side B of original LP)

- Paul Quinichette - tenor saxophone
- Sam Most - flute
- Sir Charles Thompson - piano
- Jerome Darr, Barry Galbraith - guitar
- Paul Chambers - bass
- Harold Wing - drums
