= Four Brass One Tenor =

Studio album by Al Cohn
- Released: 1955
- Recorded: May 9, 14 & 16, 1955; Webster Hall, New York City, NY, USA
- Genre: Jazz
- Label: RCA Victor; LPM 1161
- Producer: Jack Lewis

Al Cohn chronology
That Old Feeling (1955)	Four Brass One Tenor (1955)	The Brothers! (1955)

Four Brass One Tenor is an album by Al Cohn's Jazz Workshop recorded in 1955 for the RCA Victor label.

== Reception ==
Professional ratings
Review scores
Source	Rating
AllMusic	4/5 stars

The AllMusic review by Ken Dryden stated "Cohn is in terrific form, boosted by the swinging rhythm section" and called it a "very entertaining cool jazz album".

== Track listing ==
All compositions by Al Cohn except as indicated

1. "Rosetta" (Earl Hines, Henri Woode) – 4:25
2. "The Song Is Ended" (Irving Berlin) – 2:42
3. "Linger a While" (Harry Owens, Vincent Rose) – 3:22
4. "Every Time" (Walter Kent, Walton Farrar) – 2:18
5. "Haroosh" – 4:02
6. "Just Plain Sam" (Manny Albam) – 2:55
7. "I'm Coming Virginia" (Will Marion Cook, Donald Heywood) – 2:30
8. "Cohn Not Cohen" – 2:46
9. "A Little Song" – 2:47
10. "Foggy Water" (Albam) – 2:49
11. "Sugar Cohn" (Albam) – 3:07
12. "Alone Together" (Arthur Schwartz, Howard Dietz) – 3:26
- Recorded at Webster Hall in New York City on May 9 (tracks 1, 4, 6 & 12), May 14 (tracks 2 & 8–11) and May 16 (tracks 3, 5 & 7), 1955

== Personnel ==
- Al Cohn – tenor saxophone
- Bernie Glow (track 2 & 8–11), Joe Newman, Joe Wilder (tracks 1, 4, 6 & 12), Phil Sunkel (tracks 3, 5 & 7), Thad Jones – trumpet
- Nick Travis – trumpet, trombone
- Dick Katz – piano
- Freddie Green – guitar
- Buddy Jones – bass
- Osie Johnson – drums
- Al Cohn (tracks 1, 4, 5 & 7–11), Manny Albam (tracks 2, 3, 6 & 12) – arranger
