= Kansas City Revisited =

Studio album by Bob Brookmeyer
- Released: 1959
- Recorded: October 23, 1958; Olmstead Studios, NYC
- Genre: Jazz
- Label: United Artists; UAL 4008/UAS 5008
- Producer: Jack Lewis

Bob Brookmeyer chronology
The Street Swingers (1957)	Kansas City Revisited (1959)	Stretching Out (1958)

Kansas City Revisited is an album by jazz trombonist and arranger Bob Brookmeyer featuring Brookmeyer's new orchestrations of 1920s and '30s era Kansas City jazz tunes. The album was recorded in 1958 for the United Artists label.

== Reception ==
Professional ratings
Review scores
Source	Rating
Allmusic	4/5 stars

The Allmusic review by Scott Yanow called it a "memorable set" and stated "Cool jazz meets swing on this valuable but long out-of-print LP".

== Track listing ==
1. "Jumpin' at the Woodside" (Count Basie) – 7:37
2. "A Blues" (Big Miller) – 5:05
3. "Blue and Sentimental" (Basie, Jerry Livingston, Mack David) – 6:53
4. "Doggin' Around" (Edgar Battle, Herschel Evans) – 8:39
5. "Moten Swing" (Bennie Moten, Buster Moten) – 10:12
6. "Travlin' Light" (Trummy Young, Jimmy Mundy, Johnny Mercer) – 3:32

== Personnel ==
- Bob Brookmeyer – valve trombone
- Al Cohn, Paul Quinichette – tenor saxophone
- Nat Pierce – piano
- Jim Hall – guitar
- Addison Farmer – bass
- Osie Johnson – drums
- Big Miller – vocals (tracks 2 & 6)
