= You Can't Make Love Alone =

Live album by Eddie "Cleanhead" Vinson
- Released: 1971
- Recorded: June 18, 1971
- Venue: Montreux Jazz Festival, Switzerland
- Genre: Jazz, Blues
- Length: 36:59
- Label: Mega/Flying Dutchman; M31-1012
- Producer: Bob Thiele

Eddie "Cleanhead" Vinson chronology
The Original Cleanhead (1970)	You Can't Make Love Alone (1971)	Jamming the Blues (1975)

You Can't Make Love Alone is a live album by the American saxophonist/vocalist Eddie "Cleanhead" Vinson recorded at the Montreux Jazz Festival in 1971 and originally released by Mega Records on their Flying Dutchman Series.

== Reception ==
Professional ratings
Review scores
Source	Rating
AllMusic	3/5 stars

AllMusic reviewer Scott Yanow stated "Eddie "Cleanhead" Vinson was in inspired form at the 1971 Montreux Jazz Festival. He stole the show ... the quality of his performance (on which Vinson is joined by the guitars of Larry Coryell and Cornell Dupree, pianist Neal Creque, bassist Chuck Rainey and drummer Pretty Purdie) makes this album still worth acquiring".

== Track listing ==
All compositions by Eddie "Cleanhead" Vinson except where noted

1. "Straight, No Chaser" (Thelonious Monk) − 3:41
2. "Cleanhead Blues" − 3:53
3. "You Can't Make Love Alone" (George David Weiss, Bob Thiele) − 4:35
4. "I Had a Dream" − 5:40
5. "Person to Person" (Vinson, Charles Singleton, Teddy McRae) − 6:01

== Personnel ==
- Eddie "Cleanhead" Vinson − alto saxophone, vocals
- Cornell Dupree, Larry Coryell − guitar
- Neal Creque − piano
- Chuck Rainey − bass
- Bernard Purdie – drums
