= Black Velvet (O'Donel Levy album) =

Studio album by O'Donel Levy
- Released: 1971
- Recorded: 1971
- Studio: New York City
- Genre: Jazz
- Length: 39:10
- Label: Groove Merchant; GM 501
- Producer: Sonny Lester

O'Donel Levy chronology
Black Velvet (1971)	Breeding of Mind (1972)

Black Velvet is an album by American jazz guitarist O'Donel Levy recorded in 1971 and released on the Groove Merchant label.

== Reception ==
Professional ratings
Review scores
Source	Rating
Allmusic	3.5/5 stars

Allmusic's Jason Ankeny said: "Black Velvet boasts a smooth, rich texture absent from O'Donel Levy's subsequent Groove Merchant sessions – its mellow, stoned-soul sensibilities nevertheless complement the guitarist perfectly, affording him the space to weave a series of righteously beautiful solos ...the arrangements are lovely ... Levy also proves himself a composer of some distinction, contributing a pair of charming originals".

== Track listing ==
All compositions by O'Donel Levy except where noted

1. "Watch What Happens" (Michel Legrand, Jacques Demy, Norman Gimbel) – 3:33
2. "Granny" – 4:24
3. "I'll Close My Eyes" (Billy Reid) – 5:05
4. "Nature's Child" – 3:48
5. "Love Story" (Francis Lai, Carl Sigman) – 2:09
6. "Didn't I (Blow Your Mind This Time)" (Thom Bell, William Hart) – 3:06
7. "I'll Be There" (Berry Gordy, Bob West, Willie Hutch, Hal Davis) – 4:12
8. "Misty" (Erroll Garner) – 4:26
9. "Call Me" (Tony Hatch) – 4:03
10. "You've Made Me So Very Happy" (Brenda Holloway, Patrice Holloway, Frank Wilson, Berry Gordy) – 4:24

== Personnel ==
- O'Donel Levy – guitar
- Billy Skinner – trumpet
- Arthur 'Fats' Theus – tenor saxophone, flute
- Charles Covington – electric piano, organ
- Alarza Lee Collins – bass
- Chester Thompson – drums
- Nathaniel Rice Jr. − congas
- William Thorpe – percussion
