= Dawn of a New Day (O'Donel Levy album) =

Studio album by O'Donel Levy
- Released: 1973
- Recorded: 1973
- Studio: New York City
- Genre: Jazz
- Length: 37:07
- Label: Groove Merchant; GM 518
- Producer: Sonny Lester

O'Donel Levy chronology
Breeding of Mind (1972)	Dawn of a New Day (1973)	Simba (1974)

Dawn of a New Day is an album by American jazz guitarist O'Donel Levy recorded in 1971 and released on the Groove Merchant label.

== Reception ==
Professional ratings
Review scores
Source	Rating
Allmusic	4/5 stars

Allmusic's Jason Ankeny said: "Dawn of a New Day expands the Baroque funk horizons introduced on the brilliant Breeding of Mind, O'Donel Levy's previous collaboration with arranger Manny Albam. A bigger, bolder effort, Dawn 's panoramic sound also borrows much from blaxploitation cinema. ... Levy's remarkable leads seem to cut and paste elements from across the history of jazz guitar, most closely recalling the lean, mean genius of Wes Montgomery and Grant Green. His solos are graceful yet muscular, each note crackling with energy. The material here is also excellent".

== Track listing ==
All compositions by O'Donel Levy except where noted

1. "Dawn of a New Day" – 4:14
2. "Baa Waa" – 3:37
3. "I Wanna Be Where You Are" (Arthur Ross, Leon Ware) – 3:32
4. "Where Is the Love" (Ralph MacDonald, William Slater) – 2:34
5. "People Make the World Go Round" (Thom Bell, Linda Creed) – 4:42
6. "Maiden Voyage" (Herbie Hancock) – 5:49
7. "Super Woman" (Stevie Wonder) – 4:43
8. "I Want to Make It with You" (Roy Hines, Robert Esenberg, Wayne Weaver, Rich Barthlow, David Liebman) – 3:43
9. "Goin' on to Detroit" (Wes Montgomery) – 4:13

== Personnel ==
- O'Donel Levy – guitar
- Cecil Bridgewater, Burt Collins, Jon Faddis, Marvin Stamm – trumpet
- Wayne Andre, Eddie Burt, William Watrous – trombone
- Charles Covington – electric piano, organ
- George Russell – bass
- Chester Thompson – drums
- Manny Albam – arranger, conductor
