= Like Basie! =

Studio album by Paul Quinichette
- Released: 1959
- Recorded: March 20, 1959
- Studio: Nola Penthouse Sound Studio, NYC
- Genre: Jazz
- Length: 35:42
- Label: United Artists; UA 4024
- Producer: Jack Lewis

Paul Quinichette chronology
Basie Reunion (1958)	Like Basie! (1959)	Kansas City Joys (1976)

Like Basie!, (also released as Like Who? and Paul Quinichette), is an album by American jazz saxophonist Paul Quinichette featuring tracks recorded in 1959 and released on the United Artists label.

== Reception ==
Professional ratings
Review scores
Source	Rating
Allmusic	4.5/5 stars
All About Jazz	4.5/5 stars

Allmusic awarded the album 4½ stars and reviewer Scott Yanow stated, "This set features the tenor-saxophonist with Count Basie sidemen both past and present ... Quinichette might have been derivative but he always showed enthusiasm and skill in being creative within the Lester Young approach and this is a fine and formerly obscure effort". On All About Jazz, Nic Jones wrote "Quinichette's allegiance to all things Basie cannot be denied".

== Track listing ==
1. "Jump the Blues Away" (Ed Lewis) – 5:34
2. "Jump for Me" (Count Basie) – 6:40
3. "Like Basie" (Nat Pierce) – 5:48
4. "The Holy Main" (Pierce, Gene Roland) – 8:01
5. "Big D" (Pierce, Roland) – 3:57
6. "P.Q." (Paul Quinichette) – 5:40

== Personnel ==
- Paul Quinichette – tenor saxophone
- Harry Edison, Snooky Young, Dick Vance, Shad Collins – trumpet
- Al Grey – trombone
- Nat Pierce – piano
- Freddie Green – guitar
- Eddie Jones – bass
- Jo Jones – drums
