= Loose Walk =

1972 live album by Count Basie and Roy Eldridge

Live album by Count Basie, Roy Eldridge
- Released: 1972
- Recorded: 1972
- Genre: Jazz
- Length: 39:44
- Label: Pablo
- Producer: Norman Granz

Loose Walk is a 1972 album by Count Basie and Roy Eldridge.

== Reception ==
Professional ratings
Review scores
Source	Rating
AllMusic	2.5/5 stars
The Encyclopedia of Popular Music	3/5 stars
The Rolling Stone Album Guide	2.5/5 stars

Scott Yanow, writing for AllMusic, said that "[i]ronically, the earliest recording by Count Basie for Norman Granz's Pablo label was one of the most recent to be released." He called it "a set of jammable standards", yielding "quite fun" results.

Nat Hentoff, in his book Listen to the Stories: Nat Hentoff on Jazz and Country Music, wrote that "Elridge is intimately lyrical on I Surrender Dear and sounds like a whip on other tracks." On Basie's playing, he wrote that he "is moved...to break out into some robust stride piano that hadn't been heard from him in years."

== Track listing ==
1. "In a Mellow Tone" (Duke Ellington, Milt Gabler) – 6:45
2. "Loose Walk" (Sonny Stitt) – 7:20
3. "Makin' Whoopee" (Walter Donaldson, Gus Kahn) – 4:37
4. "If I Had You" (Jimmy Campbell, Reginald Connelly, Ted Shapiro) – 3:50
5. "I Surrender Dear" (Harry Barris, Gordon Clifford) – 5:25
6. "5400 North" (Roy Eldridge) – 6:50

== Personnel ==
- Count Basie – piano
- Roy Eldridge – trumpet
- Eddie "Lockjaw" Davis – tenor saxophone
- Freddie Green – guitar
- Al Grey – trombone
- Harold Jones – drums
- Norman Keenan – double bass
