= Cherry (Jimmy McGriff album) =

Studio album by Jimmy McGriff
- Released: October 1966
- Recorded: 1966 at A&R Studios in New York City
- Genre: Jazz
- Label: Solid State SS-18006
- Producer: Sonny Lester

Jimmy McGriff chronology
A Bag Full of Soul (1966)	Cherry (1966)	A Bag Full of Blues (1967)

Cherry is an album by American jazz organist Jimmy McGriff featuring performances recorded in 1966 and originally released on the Solid State label.

== Reception ==
The AllMusic site gave the album 3 stars.

Professional ratings
Review scores
Source	Rating
AllMusic	3/5 stars

== Track listing ==
1. "Cherry" (Don Redman, Ray Gilbert) – 2:20
2. "Tequila" (Chuck Rio) – 3:07
3. "Hit the Road Jack" (Percy Mayfield) – 2:52
4. "Watermelon Man" (Herbie Hancock) – 2:55
5. "Blue Moon" (Richard Rodgers, Lorenz Hart) – 3:20
6. "The Comeback" (L.C. Frazier) – 2:40
7. "I Left My Heart in San Francisco" (George Cory, Douglass Cross) – 3:00
8. "The Way You Look Tonight" (Dorothy Fields, Jerome Kern) – 4:03
9. "On the Sunny Side of the Street" (Jimmy McHugh, Fields) – 3:10
10. "Just Friends" (John Klenner, Sam M. Lewis) – 4:05
11. "The Shadow of Your Smile" (Johnny Mandel, Paul Francis Webster) – 3:20

== Personnel ==
- Jimmy McGriff – organ, vocals
- Eric Gale – guitar solos
- Everett Barksdale – rhythm guitar
- Milt Hinton – bass
- Grady Tate – drums
