= Charles Covington =

Charles Covington Jr.
- Born: Baltimore, Maryland, U.S.
- Genres: Jazz
- Occupation: Musician
- Instrument: Piano
- Website: charlescovingtonjazz.com

Charles Covington Jr. is an American jazz pianist and a U.S. Life Master in chess.

== Career ==
A native of Baltimore, Covington became interested in jazz when the high school principal broadcast music by Erroll Garner and Ahmad Jamal on the intercom. He served in the U.S. Army, attended the Peabody Institute, and learned piano and organ at the Hammond School of Music. He performed in clubs and at the Royal Theater. After the manager of George Benson heard Covington perform in New York City, he invited him to tour with Benson. He also worked with Ethel Ennis, J.J. Johnson, O'Donel Levy, and Nathan Page.

An interest in chess led Covington to chess clubs in New York. He has been certified a Life Master by the U.S. Chess Federation and is considered one of the top black chess players in the country. He has written books on chess, checkers, and math. For twenty years he taught at the Peabody Conservatory, then at Howard University. Covington has also performed as a magician. He was the pianist for the television program BET on Jazz.

== Awards and honors ==
- On the cover of Expo magazine as Jazz Musician of the Year, 1983
- Jazz pianist in residence, Kennedy Center
- Life Master, U.S. Chess Federation

== Discography ==
=== As leader ===
- It's Time for Love (Jazz Karma, 1992)

=== As sideman ===
With O'Donel Levy

- Black Velvet (Groove Merchant, 1971)
- Breeding of Mind (Groove Merchant, 1972)
- Dawn of a New Day (Groove Merchant, 1973)
- Everything I Do Gonna Be Funky (Groove Merchant, 1974)
- Windows (Groove Merchant, 1976)

With Nathen Page

- Page 1 (Hugo's Music, 1977)
- Page 2 (Hugo's Music, 1978)
- Plays Pretty for the People (Hugo's Music, 1979)

With others

- George Benson, Shape of Things to Come (A&M/CTI, 1968)
- J.J. Johnson & Kai Winding, Betwixt & Between (A&M/CTI, 1969)
- Ethel Ennis, 10 Sides of Ethel Ennis (BASF, 1973)
- Gary Thomas, Exile's Gate (JMT, 1993)
