= Kidney Stew Is Fine =

Studio album by Eddie "Cleanhead" Vinson
- Released: 1969
- Recorded: March 28, 1969
- Studio: Studio Pathe Marconi, Paris, France
- Genre: Blues
- Length: 36:59
- Label: Delmark; DS-631
- Producer: Robert G. Koester

Eddie "Cleanhead" Vinson chronology
Cherry Red (1967)	Kidney Stew Is Fine (1969)	The Original Cleanhead (1970)

Wee Baby Blues Cover

Kidney Stew Is Fine is an album by the American saxophonist/vocalist Eddie "Cleanhead" Vinson recorded in France in 1969, and originally released by the French Black & Blue label as Wee Baby Blues, before being re-released by the Delmark label in the United States.

== Reception ==
Professional ratings
Review scores
Source	Rating
AllMusic	4.5/5 stars
The Penguin Guide to Jazz Recordings	3.5/4 stars

AllMusic reviewer Scott Yanow stated " the relatively brief set is the only recording that exists of Vinson, pianist Jay McShann, and guitarist T-Bone Walker playing together ... Vinson, whether singing ... or taking boppish alto solos, is the main star throughout this album, a date that helped launch Vinson's commercial comeback".

== Track listing ==
All compositions by Eddie "Cleanhead" Vinson except where noted

1. "Somebody's Gotta Go" (Big Bill Broonzy) − 3:17
2. "Old Kidney Stew is Fine" − 3:00
3. "I'm in an Awful Mood" (T-Bone Walker) − 3:16
4. "Please Send Me Someone to Love" (Percy Mayfield) − 4:08
5. "Things Ain't What They Used to Be" (Mercer Ellington, Ted Persons) − 4:46
6. "Old Maid Boogie" − 3:45
7. "Just a Dream" (Broonzy) − 3:46
8. "Wait a Minute Baby" − 3:12
9. "Wee Baby Blues" (Pete Johnson, Big Joe Turner) − 3:17
10. "Juice Head Baby" − 4:32

== Personnel ==
- Eddie "Cleanhead" Vinson − alto saxophone, vocals
- Hal Singer − tenor saxophone
- T-Bone Walker − guitar
- Jay McShann − piano
- Jackie Sampson − bass
- Paul Gunther – drums
