= Everything I Do Gonna Be Funky =

Studio album by O'Donel Levy
- Released: 1974
- Recorded: 1974
- Studio: New York City
- Genre: Jazz-funk
- Length: 35:52
- Label: Groove Merchant; GM 535
- Producer: Sonny Lester

O'Donel Levy chronology
Simba (1974)	Everything I Do Gonna Be Funky (1974)	Windows (1976)

Everything I Do Gonna Be Funky is an album by American jazz-funk guitarist O'Donel Levy recorded in 1974 and released on the Groove Merchant label.

== Reception ==
Professional ratings
Review scores
Source	Rating
Allmusic	2.5/5 stars

Allmusic's Sean Westergaard said: "Everything I Do Gonna Be Funky, O'Donel Levy's follow-up to his excellent Simba, is something of a letdown in comparison. ... None of this is awful; it just lacks the great tunes and arrangements of its predecessor".

== Track listing ==
All compositions by O'Donel Levy except where noted

1. "Everything I Do Gonna Be Funky" – 3:20
2. "Marbles" – 6:25
3. "Will It Go Round in Circles" (Billy Preston, Bruce Fisher) – 3:20
4. "Livin' for the City" (Stevie Wonder) – 4:59
5. "Sideshow" (Bobby Eli, Vinnie Barrett) – 4:48
6. "Willow Weep for Me" (Ann Ronnell) – 6:20
7. "Hey, Love!" – 3:17
8. "Are You Foolin' Me" – 3:07

== Personnel ==
- O'Donel Levy – guitar
- Charles Covington – keyboards, synthesizer
- Hugh Walker – drums
- Judd Watkins – percussion, vocals
- Lew Soloff – trumpet (tracks 1 & 3)
- Michael Gibson – trombone (tracks 1 & 3)
- David Sanborn, Joe Temperley – saxophone (tracks 1 & 3)
- George Davis – guitar (tracks 1 & 3)
- Ralph MacDonald, James Madison – percussion (tracks 1 & 3)
- David Matthews – arranger (tracks 1 & 3)
