= Windows (O'Donel Levy album) =

Studio album by O'Donel Levy
- Released: 1976
- Recorded: August 1976
- Studio: Track Studios, Washington D.C.
- Genre: Jazz
- Length: 34:59
- Label: Groove Merchant; GM 3313
- Producer: Sonny Lester

O'Donel Levy chronology
Everything I Do Gonna Be Funky (1974)	Windows (1976)	Time Has Changed (1977)

Windows is an album by American jazz guitarist O'Donel Levy recorded in 1976 and released on the Groove Merchant label.

== Reception ==
Professional ratings
Review scores
Source	Rating
Allmusic	4/5 stars

Allmusic's Jason Ankeny said: "Following on the heels of George Benson's crossover blockbuster Breezin', Windows casts O'Donel Levy in the same mainstream, fusion-inspired mold, complete with vocals. To Levy's credit, the album never feels like a sell-out bid, and if anything, the mellow context underscores the chromatic beauty of his singular guitar aesthetic. With its bold, lush arrangements, the album at times boasts a cinematic splendor calling to mind the blaxploitation sound. Inasmuch as funk is ever subtle, Windows is ripe with nuance and resonance, yet never falls prey to the sleepiness of smooth jazz".

== Track listing ==
All compositions by O'Donel Levy

1. "Panama Red" – 6:34
2. "I Believe in Miracles" – 5:45
3. "Freedom and Good Times" – 5:28
4. "I'll Sing from My Window" – 5:36
5. "Moisturizer" – 6:22
6. "Green Machine" – 5:14

== Personnel ==
- O'Donel Levy – guitar
- Aleta Greene – vocals
- Stafford Levy – drums
- Gary Grainger – bass
- David E.Smith – saxophone, flute
- Jimmy Wilson – trumpet
- Charles Covington – piano, synthesizer
- Jimmy Maelen – percussion
- Horn section and string section arranged and conducted by Brad Baker
  - Lew Del Gatto, George Young – saxophone, flute
  - Lew Soloff, Randy Brecker – trumpet
  - Barry Rogers, Joe Randazzo – trombone
  - Tony Posk, Guy Lumia, Norman Carr, Frederick Buldrini, Harold Kohan, Richard Sortomme, Julian Barker, Richard Maximoff, Jesse Levy, Richard Locker – strings
