= For Basie =

Album by Paul Quinichette

Studio album by Paul Quinichette
- Released: 1957
- Recorded: October 18, 1957
- Studio: Van Gelder Studio, Hackensack, New Jersey
- Genre: Jazz
- Length: 38:04
- Label: Prestige; PR 7127
- Producer: Bob Weinstock

Paul Quinichette chronology
The Chase Is On (1957)	For Basie (1957)	Basie Reunion (1958)

For Basie is an album by American jazz saxophonist Paul Quinichette featuring tracks recorded in 1957 and released on the Prestige label.

== Reception ==
Professional ratings
Review scores
Source	Rating
Allmusic	4.5/5 stars
The Penguin Guide to Jazz Recordings	3/4 stars

Allmusic awarded the album 4½ stars and reviewer Scott Yanow stated, "the sextet jams on five Basie-associated tunes from the 1930s and 40s, none of which are exactly overplayed ... Each of the songs serves as a strong vehicle for swing-oriented solos and the musicians sound quite inspired. Recommended". In JazzTimes, Stanley Dance wrote "Paul Quinichette was not styled the Vice-Pres for nothing. Of all the tenor players Lester Young inspired, he passed on the message the most faithfully. He was too often dismissed as an imitator, but Young’s language seemed to be natural to him, so that his flow was not broken up by the fashionable ejaculations necessary to others. The program of Basie hits perhaps imposed limitations of another kind".

== Track listing ==
1. "Rock-a-Bye Basie" (Count Basie, Shad Collins) – 6:34
2. "Texas Shuffle" (Herschel Evans) – 7:02
3. "Out the Window" (Basie, Eddie Durham) – 7:33
4. "Jive at Five" (Basie, Harry Edison) – 9:45
5. "Diggin' for Dex" (Basie, Durham) – 7:10

== Personnel ==
- Paul Quinichette – tenor saxophone
- Shad Collins – trumpet
- Nat Pierce – piano
- Freddie Green – guitar
- Walter Page – bass
- Jo Jones – drums
