= Hold It Right There! =

Live album by Eddie "Cleanhed" Vinson and the Muse Allstars
- Released: 1984
- Recorded: August 25–26, 1978
- Venue: Sandy's Jazz Revival, Beverley, MA
- Genre: Jazz
- Length: 39:06
- Label: Muse; MR 5243
- Producer: Bob Porter

Eddie "Cleanhed" Vinson chronology
Live at Sandy's (1981)	Hold It Right There! (1984)	Eddie "Cleanhead" Vinson Sings the Blues (1985)

Hold It Right There! is a live album by saxophonist/vocalist Eddie "Cleanhed" Vinson which was recorded at Sandy's Jazz Revival in 1978 and released on the Muse label in 1984.

== Reception ==
Professional ratings
Review scores
Source	Rating
AllMusic	4.5/5 stars

The AllMusic review by Scott Yanow stated "After years of neglect, Eddie "Cleanhead" Vinson was finally receiving long overdue recognition at the time of this live session—one of six albums recorded during a week at Sandy's Jazz Revival ... While Vinson has fine blues vocals ... it is his boppish alto solos ... that make this set recommended to blues and bop fans alike".

== Track listing ==
1. "Cherry Red" (Joe Turner) – 3:45
2. "Cherokee" (Ray Noble) – 7:27
3. "Hold It Right There" (Eddie Vinson) – 7:10
4. "Now's the Time" (Charlie Parker) – 6:53
5. "Take the "A" Train" (Billy Strayhorn) – 14:01

== Personnel ==
- Eddie "Cleanhead" Vinson – alto saxophone, vocals
- Ray Bryant – piano
- George Duvivier – bass
- Alan Dawson – drums
- Arnett Cobb, Buddy Tate - tenor saxophone (tracks 3 & 5)
