= The Big Band =

Studio album by Jimmy McGriff
- Released: 1966
- Recorded: 1966
- Studio: A & R Studios, New York City
- Genre: Jazz
- Length: 36:45
- Label: Solid State; SS-18001
- Producer: Sonny Lester

Jimmy McGriff chronology
Where the Action's At! (1966)	The Big Band (1966)	A Bag Full of Soul (1966)

The Big Band (rereleased as The Big Band: A Tribute to Basie) is an album by American jazz organist Jimmy McGriff featuring performances recorded in 1966 and originally released on the Solid State label.

== Reception ==
In his review for Allmusic, Scott Yanow wrote, "Matching the leader's powerful organ with a big band was a logical idea and one that would be successfully repeated quite a few times in the future".

Professional ratings
Review scores
Source	Rating
Allmusic	4/5 stars

== Track listing ==
1. "Hob Nail Boogie" (Buster Harding) – 2:28
2. "Cherry Point" (Neal Hefti) – 3:57
3. "Swingin' the Blues" (Count Basie, Eddie Durham) – 3:47
4. "Cute" (Hefti) – 3:29
5. "Every Day I Have the Blues" (Memphis Slim) – 4:07
6. "Blues Go Away" (Ernie Wilkins) – 3:34
7. "Avenue C" – 2:58
8. "L'il Darlin'" (Hefti) – 4:32
9. "Splanky" (Hefti) – 3:17
10. "Slow But Sure" (Manny Albam) – 4:36

== Personnel ==
- Jimmy McGriff – organ
- Jimmy Nottingham, Burt Collins, Markie Markowitz, Joe Newman – trumpet
- J. J. Johnson, Wayne Andre, Dick Hixson – trombone
- Tony Studd – bass trombone
- Jerome Richardson, Frank Wess – alto saxophone
- Budd Johnson, Frank Foster – tenor saxophone
- Seldon Powell – baritone saxophone
- Kenny Burrell, Thornell Schwartz – guitar
- Richard Davis, Chet Amsterdam – bass
- Grady Tate – drums
- Manny Albam – arranger
