= The "Clean" Machine =

Studio album by Eddie "Cleanhead" Vinson
- Released: 1978
- Recorded: February 22, 1978
- Studio: Wally Heider, Los Angeles, CA
- Genre: Jazz
- Label: Muse; MR 5116
- Producer: Joe Fields

Eddie "Cleanhead" Vinson chronology
Jamming the Blues (1975)	The "Clean" Machine (1978)	Live at Sandy's (1981)

The "Clean" Machine is an album by saxophonist Eddie "Cleanhead" Vinson, recorded and released by the Muse label in 1978.

== Reception ==
Professional ratings
Review scores
Source	Rating
AllMusic	4/5 stars
DownBeat	3.5/5 stars

The Bay State Banner wrote that "Vinson can play jump blues or swing with anyone, and his technique proves excellence is not confined only to the intricate or the avant-garde."

The AllMusic review by Scott Yanow stated: "What makes this album different from many of Eddie 'Cleanhead' Vinson's is that four of the seven selections are taken as instrumentals. Vinson's alto playing has long been underrated due to his popularity as a blues singer, so this release gives one the opportunity to hear his bop-influenced solos at greater length. With the assistance of a strong rhythm section ... Vinson is in excellent form throughout this enjoyable set".

== Track listing ==
All compositions by Eddie Vinson except where noted

1. "The Clean Machine" – 5:32
2. "Taxi Driver Blues" (Leonard Feather) – 5:04
3. "Corn Fed" – 6:38
4. "When My Baby Left Me" – 4:54
5. "Old Maid Boogie" – 3:01
6. "Tenderly" (Walter Gross, Jack Lawrence) – 4:35
7. "Non-alcoholic" – 4:42

== Personnel ==
- Eddie "Cleanhead" Vinson – alto saxophone, vocals
- Jerry Rusch – trumpet
- Rashid Ali – tenor saxophone
- Gary Bell – guitar
- Lloyd Glenn – piano
- Larry Gales – bass
- Bruno Carr – drums
