= The Natural Seven =

Studio album by Al Cohn
- Released: 1955
- Recorded: February 3, 1955
- Studio: Webster Hall, New York City
- Genre: Jazz
- Length: 38:28
- Label: RCA Victor; LPM 1116
- Producer: Jack Lewis

Al Cohn chronology
Mr. Music (1954)	The Natural Seven (1955)	That Old Feeling (1955)

The Natural Seven is an album by saxophonist, composer and arranger Al Cohn recorded in 1955 for the RCA Victor label.

== Reception ==
Professional ratings
Review scores
Source	Rating
AllMusic	3/5 stars
The Penguin Guide to Jazz Recordings	3/4 stars

In his review for AllMusic, Scott Yanow wrote, "Although originally associated with Woody Herman and cool jazz, Cohn always felt equally comfortable playing with swing-styled players. His "Natural Seven" looks toward the Kansas City Seven and includes two members of Count Basie's band".

== Track listing ==
All compositions by Al Cohn except as indicated

1. "A Kiss to Build a Dream On" (Bert Kalmar, Harry Ruby, Oscar Hammerstein II) – 3:34
2. "Doggin' Around" (Edgar Battle, Herschel Evans) – 3:04
3. "Jump the Blues Away" (Ed Lewis) – 3:01
4. "Jack's Kinda Swing" – 3:39
5. "The Natural Thing to Do" – 3:03
6. "A.C. Meets Osie" – 2:49
7. "Baby Please" – 3:07
8. "9:20 Special" (Earle Warren, Jack Palmer, William Engvick) – 3:01
9. "Pick a Dilly" – 3:34
10. "Count Me In" – 3:37
11. "Freddie's Tune" (Freddie Green) – 3:29
12. "Osie's Blues" (Manny Albam, Osie Johnson) – 2:30

== Personnel ==
- Al Cohn – tenor saxophone
- Joe Newman – trumpet
- Frank Rehak – trombone
- Nat Pierce – piano
- Freddie Green – guitar
- Milt Hinton – bass
- Osie Johnson – drums, vocal
- Manny Albam (tracks 1, 3, 8, and 12), Al Cohn (tracks 4–7; 9–11), Ernie Wilkins (track 2) – arranger
