= Clean Head's Back in Town =

Studio album by Eddie "Cleanhead" Vinson
- Released: November 1957
- Recorded: August 1957
- Studio: New York City
- Genre: Blues
- Length: 40:12
- Label: Bethlehem; BCP 5005
- Producer: Bob Thiele

Eddie "Cleanhead" Vinson chronology
Clean Head's Back in Town (1957)	Back Door Blues (1967)

Clean Head's Back in Town, subtitled Eddie Vinson Sings, is an album by the American saxophonist and vocalist Eddie "Cleanhead" Vinson. Recorded in 1957, it was released by Bethlehem Records.

== Reception ==
Professional ratings
Review scores
Source	Rating
Allmusic	4.5/5 stars
The Penguin Guide to Blues Recordings	3/4 stars

AllMusic reviewer Scott Yanow wrote that "...this infectious set finds him performing some of his best known tunes. With assistance by a medium-size group that plays in a Count Basie groove ... A good sampling of the great Cleanhead.".

== Track listing ==
All compositions by Eddie "Cleanhead" Vinson, Dossie Terry and William Gray except where noted

1. "Cleanhead's Back in Town" − 3:02
2. "That's the Way to Treat Your Woman" − 2:30
3. "Trouble in Mind" (Richard M. Jones) − 2:28
4. "Kidney Stew Blues" (Vinson, Leona Blackman) − 2:30
5. "Sweet Lovin' Baby" (Charles Darwin) − 2:58
6. "Caldonia" (Fleecie Moore) − 2:51
7. "It Ain't Necessarily So" (George Gershwin, Ira Gershwin) − 2:49
8. "Cherry Red" (Pete Johnson, Big Joe Turner) − 2:44
9. "Is You Is or Is You Ain't My Baby" (Louis Jordan, Bill Austin) − 2:52
10. "I Just Can't Keep the Tears from Tumblin' Down" (Darwin) − 3:13
11. "Your Baby Ain't Sweet Like Mine" − 2:27
12. "Hold It Right There" − 2:30
13. "Trouble in Mind" [alternate take] (Jones) − 2:26
14. "Kidney Stew Blues" [alternate take] (Vinson, Blackman) − 2:28
15. "Hold It Right There" [alternate take] − 2:24

== Personnel ==
- Eddie "Cleanhead" Vinson − alto saxophone, vocals
- Joe Newman − trumpet
- Henry Coker − trombone
- Bill Graham − alto saxophone (tracks 1, 4, 5, 7-11 & 13–15)
- Charlie Rouse (tracks 2, 3, 6 & 12), Frank Foster (tracks 1, 5, 10 & 11), Paul Quinichette (tracks 2–4, 6-9 & 12 to 15) − tenor saxophone
- Charles Fowlkes − baritone saxophone
- Nat Pierce − piano
- Freddie Green (tracks 2, 3, 6 & 12), Turk Van Lake (tracks 1, 4, 5, 7-11 & 13–15) − guitar
- Ed Jones − bass
- Ed Thigpen (tracks 2–4, 6-9 & 12–15), Gus Johnson (tracks: 1, 5, 10, 11) − drums
- Ernie Wilkins (tracks 1, 4, 7-9 & 11), Harry Tubbs (tracks 5, 6, 10 & 12), Manny Albam (tracks 2 & 3) − arranger
