= That Old Feeling (Al Cohn album) =

Studio album by Al Cohn and His Orchestra Featuring Joe Newman
- Released: 1956
- Recorded: May 6, 11 & 13, 1955; Webster Hall, New York City
- Genre: Jazz
- Length: 37:04
- Label: RCA Victor; LPM 1207
- Producer: Jack Lewis

Al Cohn chronology
The Natural Seven (1955)	That Old Feeling (1956)	Four Brass One Tenor (1956)

That Old Feeling is an album by saxophonist and arranger Al Cohn and His Orchestra featuring trumpeter Joe Newman recorded in 1955 for the RCA Victor label.

== Reception ==
Professional ratings
Review scores
Source	Rating
Allmusic	3/5 stars

Allmusic awarded the album 3 stars.

== Track listing ==
1. "That Old Feeling" (Sammy Fain, Lew Brown) – 2:49
2. "Gone With The Wind" (Allie Wrubel, Herb Magidson) – 3:05
3. "Sweet and Lovely" (Gus Arnheim, Harry Tobias, Jules LeMare) – 2:12
4. "Soft as Spring" (Alec Wilder) – 3:36
5. "I'll Take Romance" (Ben Oakland, Oscar Hammerstein II) – 2:48
6. "Azure-Té (Paris Blues)" (Don Wolf, Bill Davis) – 3:42
7. "I'll Be Around" (Wilder) – 2:58
8. "Swingin' the Blues" (Count Basie, Eddie Durham) – 3:16
9. "Trouble Is a Man" (Wilder) – 2:49
10. "Honey Blonde" (Jerry Leshay) – 3:07
11. "Willow Weep for Me" (Ann Ronell) – 3:20
12. "In a Mellow Tone" (Duke Ellington) – 2:49
- Recorded at Webster Hall in New York City on May 6 (tracks 1, 2, 9 & 11), May 11 (tracks 3 & 5–7) and May 13 (tracks 4, 8, 10 & 12), 1955

== Personnel ==
- Al Cohn - tenor saxophone
- Joe Newman - trumpet
- Hank Jones - piano
- Freddie Green - guitar
- Milt Hinton - bass
- Osie Johnson - drums
- Gene Orloff - concertmaster, violin
- Fred Buldrini (tracks 4, 8, 10 & 12), Max Hollander, Harry Katzman (tracks 3–8, 10 & 12), Leo Kruczek, Milton Lomask, Harry Lookofsky (tracks 3, 5, 6 & 6), Harry Melnikoff (tracks 1–4 & 9–12), Seymour Miroff (tracks 1, 2, 9 & 11), Julius Schnachter (tracks 1, 2, 9 & 11), Paul Winter (tracks 1, 2, 9 & 11) - violin
- Bernie Greenhouse (tracks 1–3, 5–7, 9 & 11), George Ricci (tracks 3 & 5–7), Lucien Schmidt (tracks 1–3, 5–7, 9 & 11), Morris Stonzek (tracks 1–3 & 11)
- Manny Albam (tracks 4, 7, 9 & 10), Ralph Burns (tracks 5, 6 & 11), Al Cohn (tracks 1, 3 & 12), Ernie Wilkins (tracks 2 & 8) - arranger
