= Simba (album) =

Studio album by O'Donel Levy
- Released: 1974
- Recorded: July 2 & 3, 1973
- Studio: New York City
- Genre: Jazz
- Length: 38:58
- Label: Groove Merchant; GM 526
- Producer: Sonny Lester

O'Donel Levy chronology
Dawn of a New Day (1973)	Simba (1974)	Everything I Do Gonna Be Funky (1974)

Simba is an album by American jazz guitarist O'Donel Levy recorded in 1973 and released on the Groove Merchant label the following year.

== Reception ==
Professional ratings
Review scores
Source	Rating
Allmusic	4/5 stars

Allmusic's Sean Westergaard said: "Simba is one hot album of funky soul-jazz. ... The songs are catchy and funky, and play to Levy's strengths as a player. The arrangements are fantastic, played by a who's who list of '70s session men ... Simba is the O'Donel Levy album to own".

== Track listing ==
All compositions by Manny Albam except where noted

1. "Bad, Bad Simba" – 7:15
2. "Kilimanjaro Cookout" – 4:56
3. "Playhouse" (Manny Albam, O'Donel Levy) – 4:41
4. "Sierra Lonely" – 5:37
5. "Sad, Sad, Simba" – 6:08
6. "Joni" (Levy) – 5:12
7. "Nigerian Knights" (Levy) – 5:09

== Personnel ==
- O'Donel Levy – guitar
- Eddie Daniels – flute, piccolo, baritone saxophone
- Jon Faddis, Ernie Royal – trumpet
- Burt Collins, Lew Soloff – flugelhorn, trumpet
- Cecil Bridgewater, Alan Rubin – flugelhorn
- Bill Watrous – trombone
- Warren Bernhardt – electric piano
- Tony Levin – bass
- Steve Gadd – drums
- Manny Albam – arranger
