= Shad Collins =

American jazz musician

Lester Rallingston "Shad" Collins (June 27, 1910 – June 6, 1978) was an American jazz trumpet player, composer and arranger, who played in several leading bands between the 1930s and 1950s, including those led by Chick Webb, Benny Carter, Count Basie, Lester Young, Cab Calloway and Sam "The Man" Taylor.

== Life and career ==
Born in Elizabeth, New Jersey, United States, the son of a clergyman, he acquired the nickname of "Shad" in his teens, and by the late 1920s had joined Charlie Dixon's band. He also performed with pianist Eddie White, before joining Chick Webb's band in 1931. In the mid-1930s he played in Teddy Hill's band, with whom he toured in Britain and Europe, before joining the Count Basie Orchestra. He performed in Basie's band at the From Spirituals to Swing concerts in New York City in 1938 and 1939. He also worked in the late 1930s in bands led by Benny Carter, Lester Young and Don Redman, among others.

In 1941, he replaced Dizzy Gillespie in Cab Calloway's band, and remained with Calloway until 1943 and again between 1944 and 1946. He also worked and recorded in the 1940s with Oran "Hot Lips" Page. In the 1950s, he played in Jimmy Rushing's band, and with Sam "The Man" Taylor, when he developed a style more suited to the rhythm and blues music then popular. He worked more on a part-time basis during the 1960s.

Collins was also known as a composer and arranger, responsible for the frequently recorded tune "Rock-a-Bye Basie" among others.

Shad Collins died in June 1978, at the age of 67.

== Discography ==
- Count Basie, The Count Swings Out (Coral, 1959)
- Count Basie, The Original American Decca Recordings (GRP, 1992)
- Cab Calloway, This Is Hep (Proper, 2008)
- Benny Carter, The Music Master (Proper, 2006)
- Vic Dickenson, Nice Work (Vanguard, 1999)
- Dizzy Gillespie, The Complete RCA Victor Recordings (Bluebird, 1995)
- Coleman Hawkins, The Essential Sides Remastered (JSP, 2006)
- Billie Holiday, Ain't Nobody's Business If I Do (CBS, 1975)
- Spike Hughes, Spike Hughes and His All American Orchestra (London, 1956)
- Sam Price, 1929–1941 (Classics, 1993)
- Paul Quinichette, Jo Jones, Shad Collins, Basie Reunion (Prestige, 1958)
- Paul Quinchette, Like Basie! (United Artists, 1959)
- Paul Quinichette, Buck Clayton, Shad Collins, For Basie (Prestige Swingville, 1963)
- Dicky Wells, Dicky Wells in Paris (His Master's Voice, 1955)
