= A Bag Full of Soul =

Studio album by Jimmy McGriff
- Released: 1966
- Recorded: 1966 in New York City
- Genre: Jazz
- Label: Solid State SS-18002
- Producer: Sonny Lester

Jimmy McGriff chronology
The Big Band (1966)	A Bag Full of Soul (1966)	Cherry (1966)

A Bag Full of Soul is an album by American jazz organist Jimmy McGriff featuring performances recorded in 1966 and originally released on the Solid State label.

== Reception ==
The AllMusic review by Michael Erlewine simply stated "McGriff with funk guitarist Thornell Schwartz".

Professional ratings
Review scores
Source	Rating
AllMusic	3/5 stars

== Track listing ==
All compositions by Jimmy McGriff except as indicated

1. "I Cover the Waterfront" (Edward Eliscu, Johnny Green) - 5:00
2. "D.B. Blues (Part I)" - 6:18
3. "D.B. Blues (Part II)" - 5:05
4. "See See Rider" (Ma Rainey) - 4:17
5. "Red River Blues" - 3:26
6. "Hallelujah" - 2:33
7. "Boston Bust Out" - 3:14
8. "On the Way Home" - 3:29

== Personnel ==
- Jimmy McGriff - organ
- Thornel Schwartz - guitar
- Willie Jenkins - drums
