= Basie Reunion =

Studio album by Paul Quinichette
- Released: 1958
- Recorded: September 5, 1958
- Studio: Van Gelder Studio, Hackensack, New Jersey
- Genre: Jazz
- Length: 40:15
- Label: Prestige; PR 7147
- Producer: Bob Weinstock

Paul Quinichette chronology
For Basie (1957)	Basie Reunion (1958)	Like Basie! (1959)

Basie Reunion is an album by Count Basie Orchestra members led by jazz saxophonist Paul Quinichette featuring tracks recorded in 1958 and released on the Prestige label.

The first two tracks are correctly identified on the CD reissue; the original LP issue has the titles reversed (although Ira Gitler correctly identifies the titles in his liner notes). In 1982, Prestige issued this session as a gatefold LP paired with For Basie as Basie Reunions; this issue also has the track titles reversed.

== Reception ==
Professional ratings
Review scores
Source	Rating
Allmusic	4.5/5 stars

Allmusic awarded the album 4½ stars and reviewer Ken Dryden stated, "While this session isn't meant to substitute for the original recordings by Count Basie, the consistently swinging performances make this meeting of mostly Basie alumni worth purchasing". On All About Jazz, Derek Taylor wrote "Brimming with talent from bands past and present the one-shot aggregation places a premium on expansive individual solos and relaxed first-rate swing ... This disc a winner on a variety of fronts: as an opportunity to hear Basie alum paying inspired homage to their employer, and as a rare opportunity to hear Washington cut loose in the company of his peers. Recommended wholeheartedly to any and all hepcats still practicing or reformed".

== Track listing ==
1. "Love Jumped Out" (Buck Clayton) – 5:56
2. "The Blues I Like to Hear" (Buster Smith) – 7:27
3. "John's Idea" (Count Basie, Eddie Durham) – 9:18
4. "Baby, Don't Tell on Me" (Basie, Lester Young, Jimmy Rushing) – 7:56
5. "Roseland Shuffle" (Basie) – 9:37

== Personnel ==
- Paul Quinichette – tenor saxophone
- Buck Clayton – trumpet
- Shad Collins – trumpet
- Jack Washington – baritone saxophone
- Nat Pierce – piano
- Freddie Green – guitar
- Eddie Jones – bass
- Jo Jones – drums
