= Breeding of Mind =

Studio album by O'Donel Levy
- Released: 1972
- Recorded: 1972
- Studio: New York City
- Genre: Jazz
- Length: 38:41
- Label: Groove Merchant; GM 507
- Producer: Sonny Lester

O'Donel Levy chronology
| Black Velvet (1971) | Breeding of Mind (1972) | Dawn of a New Day (1973) |

Breeding of Mind is an album by American jazz guitarist O'Donel Levy recorded in 1972 and released on the Groove Merchant label.

== Reception ==
Professional ratings
Review scores
| Source | Rating |
|---|---|
| Allmusic | 4.5/5 stars |

Allmusic's Jason Ankeny said: "Breeding of Mind pairs guitarist O'Donel Levy with arranger Manny Albam for a genre-defying set that embraces elements of jazz, funk and baroque pop -- the end result is soulful and sublime, couching Levy's uncommonly expressive tone in a series of bold, lush contexts that underline the sophistication of his craft".

== Track listing ==
All compositions by O'Donel Levy except where noted

1. "We've Only Just Begun" (Roger Nichols, Paul Williams) – 3:57
2. "It's Too Late" (Carole King, Toni Stern) – 3:35
3. "Breeding of Mind" – 3:14
4. "Cherries" – 4:04
5. "On Broadway" (Barry Mann, Cynthia Weil, Jerry Leiber, Mike Stoller) – 3:37
6. "Ideal" – 4:01
7. "Never Can Say Goodbye" (Clifton Davis) – 5:18
8. "Let's Stay Together" (Al Green, Willie Mitchell, Al Jackson Jr.) – 3:09
9. "The Chocolate Horse" – 3:17
10. "Angel Eyes" (Matt Dennis, Earl Brent) – 4:29

== Personnel ==
- O'Donel Levy – guitar
- Charles Covington – organ
- Eric Ward – bass
- Chester Thompson – drums
- Manny Albam – arranger, conductor (tracks 1–4)
- Burt Collins, Joe Shepley – flugelhorn (tracks 1–4)
- David Nadien, Selwart Clarke, Gene Orloff, Paul Gershman, Joe Malin, Alfred Brown, Emanuel Green – violin (tracks 1–4)
- Kermit Moore, George Ricci, Charles McCracken – cello (tracks 1–4)
