= The Original Cleanhead =

Studio album by Eddie "Cleanhead" Vinson
- Released: 1970
- Recorded: October 29, 1969
- Studio: Los Angeles, California
- Genre: Blues
- Length: 42:18
- Label: BluesTime; BTS-9007
- Producer: Bob Thiele

Eddie "Cleanhead" Vinson chronology
Kidney Stew Is Fine (1969)	The Original Cleanhead (1970)	You Can't Make Love Alone (1971)

The Original Cleanhead is an album by the American saxophonist/vocalist Eddie "Cleanhead" Vinson recorded in Los Angeles in 1969 and originally released by the BluesTime label.

== Reception ==
Professional ratings
Review scores
Source	Rating
AllMusic	3/5 stars
Robert Christgau	A−

AllMusic reviewer Stephen Thomas Erlewine stated "choosing to more or less adhere to the blend of blues, R&B, and bop that became his signature in the '40s, along with relying on a selection of familiar songs. Vinson does show some signs of settling into his role as an old pro -- his voice, which surfaces often, is robust and gravelly, he prefers to ease back rather than push ... The Original Cleanhead captures an elder statesman who demands respect for his old tricks but is intent on not turning them into shtick ... This makes The Original Cleanhead not a major session but rather an easy pleasure that's hard to resist". Robert Christgau called it "A worthy introduction to one of the cleanest--and nastiest--blues voices you'll ever hear. He also plays alto sax with the solid adaptability of a territory man who's been on the road since the '40".

== Track listing ==
All compositions by Eddie "Cleanhead" Vinson except where noted

1. "Cleanhead Blues" − 2:31
2. "Pass Out" (Joe Pass) − 6:22
3. "Alimony Blues" − 2:34
4. "Cleanhead Is Back" − 3:50
5. "Juice Head Baby" − 3:18
6. "Old Maid Boogie" − 3:17
7. "One O'Clock Humph" (Plas Johnson, Earl Palmer) − 6:55
8. "I Needs to Be Be'd Wid" − 2:50

== Personnel ==
- Eddie "Cleanhead" Vinson − alto saxophone, vocals
- Plas Johnson − tenor saxophone
- David Cohen, Joe Pass − guitar
- Artie Butler − piano, organ
- Arthur Wright − bass
- Earl Palmer – drums
