= Paul Quinichette =

American jazz saxophonist (1916–1983)

- Born: May 17, 1916; Denver, Colorado, U.S.
- Died: May 25, 1983 (aged 67) New York City, U.S.
- Genres: Jazz
- Occupation: Musician
- Instrument: Tenor saxophone
- Years active: late 1930s – 1950s; 1970s
- Labels: EmArcy; Brunswick; Prestige; Bethlehem; United Artists; Famous Door

Paul Quinichette (May 17, 1916 – May 25, 1983) was an American jazz tenor saxophonist. He was known as the "Vice President" or "Vice Prez" for his emulation of the breathy style of Lester Young, whose nickname was "The President", or simply "Prez". Young called Quinichette "Lady Q".

== Early life ==
Quinichette was born in Denver, Colorado. He took clarinet and alto saxophone lessons as a child before switching to tenor saxophone. Around the age of 13, he had informal lessons from Lester Young. Quinichette attended Denver University, transferred to Tennessee State College, and then returned to Denver University, from which he graduated in music. While in college, he played with local bands, and during summer vacations, he toured with Nat Towles and trumpeter Lloyd Hunter.

== Career and later life ==
Quinichette worked with Shorty Sherock in the late 1930s and was then with Ernie Fields (1942) and Jay McShann (1942–43). He was with Johnny Otis on the West Coast from 1945 to 1947, then went to New York with Louis Jordan in 1947. In New York, he played with various musicians before joining Count Basie in 1951. After two years with Basie, and buoyed by the success of his own recordings for EmArcy, Quinichette left to form his own band.

In the mid- to late-1950s, Quinichette also accompanied vocalist Dinah Washington on EmArcy recordings and played with Benny Goodman and Nat Pierce (both 1955), John Coltrane (1957), and Billie Holiday. In the following decade, poor health hindered his activities as a musician, and he took work as an electrical engineer. Although still restricted, he resumed performing in 1973.

Quinichette died in New York City on May 25, 1983, aged 67.

== Playing style ==
The Grove Dictionary comments that "Quinichette's style displayed a sense of swing unequaled among those musicians who followed Young." Writing in 1959, critic John S. Wilson stated that, after leaving Basie, "Quinichette has inclined to a coarseness of tone and ideas and an attack that stems as much from the less palatable side of Illinois Jacquet as it does from Young."

== Discography ==
- The Vice Pres (EmArcy, 1951–52)
- Blow Your Horn (Brunswick, 1953)
- Moods (EmArcy, 1954)
- Sequel (EmArcy, 1954)
- The Kid From Denver (Dawn, 1956)
- On the Sunny Side (Prestige, 1957)
- Cattin' with Coltrane and Quinichette (Prestige, 1957 [1959]) – with John Coltrane
- The Chase Is On (Bethlehem, 1957) – with Charlie Rouse
- For Basie (Prestige, 1957) – with Shad Collins, Freddie Green, Walter Page, Jo Jones, and Nat Pierce
- Basie Reunion (Prestige, 1958) – with Buck Clayton, Shad Collins, Jack Washington, Freddie Green, Eddie Jones, Joe Jones, and Nat Pierce
- When the Blues Comes On (Bethlehem, 1958) – with Charlie Rouse
- Like Basie! (United Artists, 1959)
- Paul Quinichette (United Artists, 1960)
- Prevue (Famous Door, 1974)

=== As sideman ===
With Gene Ammons

- The Big Sound (Prestige, 1958)
- Groove Blues (Prestige, 1958)

With Count Basie

- The Count! (Clef, 1952 [1955])
- Basie Jazz (Clef, 1952 [1954])
- The Swinging Count! (Clef 1952 [1956])
- Dance Session Album No. 2 (Clef, 1954)

With Bob Brookmeyer

- Kansas City Revisited (United Artists, 1958)

With Billie Holiday

- An Evening with Billie Holiday (Clef, 1953)
- Lady Sings the Blues (Clef, 1956)

With Jay McShann

- The Last of the Blue Devils (Atlantic, 1978)

With The Prestige All Stars

- Wheelin' & Dealin' (Prestige, 1957) – with John Coltrane and Frank Wess

With Sarah Vaughan

- Sarah Vaughan (EmArcy, 1954) – with Clifford Brown

With Eddie "Cleanhead" Vinson

- Clean Head's Back in Town (Bethlehem, 1957)

With Mal Waldron

- The Dealers (Prestige, 1964)

With Dinah Washington

- Blazing Ballads (Mercury, 1952)
- After Hours with Miss "D" (EmArcy, 1954)
- For Those in Love (EmArcy, 1955)

With Webster Young

- For Lady (Prestige, 1957)

== See also ==
- Jazz royalty
