= Sanford Gold =

American jazz musician

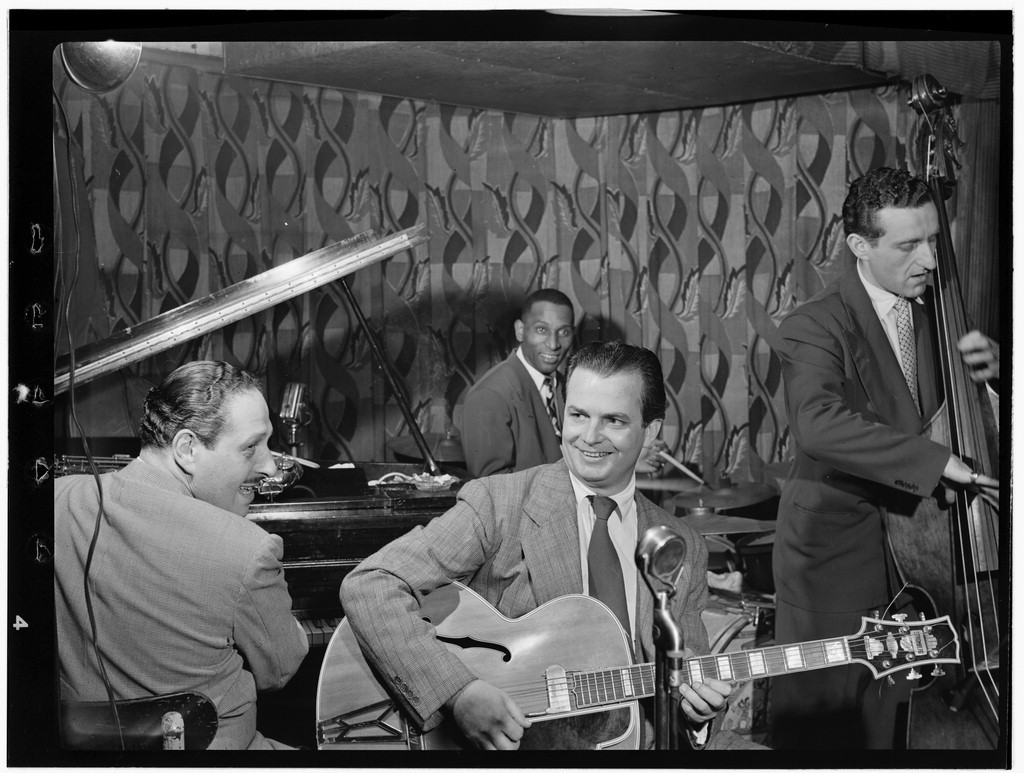
Mike Bryan, Sanford Gold, Cozy Cole, and Jack Lesberg, Famous Door, New York, N.Y., ca. October 1947 (William P. Gottlieb)

Sanford Gold (June 9, 1911 – May 29, 1984) was an American jazz pianist born in Cleveland, Ohio.

Gold played locally in Cleveland and led regional bands before moving to New York City in the 1930s. There he collaborated with Babe Russin and Raymond Scott in 1935, and formed a trio with Dave Barbour in 1941. In 1942 he worked as a studio musician for CBS before serving in World War II from 1942 to 1946. After being discharged from the military, he worked with Don Byas, Mary Osborne and others before he went to work for CBS rival NBC, from 1949-1954. An album was recorded under his name on the Prestige label in 1955, entitled Piano d'Or. Gold was also a sideman with Johnny Smith, Al Cohn, Vic Dickenson, Coleman Hawkins and Sally Blair.

Gold was one of the premier jazz piano teachers of his time. His self-published book, A Modern Approach to Keyboard Harmony and Piano Techniques, distills the complexities of jazz and classical harmony down to a simple yet far-reaching system of piano and harmonic exercises, and has become an underground classic for serious students of the instrument.

== Discography ==
- Don Byas: Don Byas 1946 (Classics)
- Al Cohn and His Charlie Tavern's Ensemble: East Coast-West Coast Scene (RCA Victor, 1954)
- Al Cohn: Mr. Music (RCA Victor, 1955)
- Vic Dickenson: Breaks, Blues & Boogie (Topaz, 1941–46)
- Stan Getz: The Complete Roost Recordings (Blue Note, 1950–54 [1997])
- Coleman Hawkins: The Hawk Talks (Decca, 1952-53 [1955])
- Johnny Smith: Moonlight in Vermont (Fresh Sound, 1952–53)
- Johnny Smith - Stan Getz Quintet: Stan Getz - The Complete 1948-1952 Quintet Sessions (Blue Moon)
- Sally Blair: Squeeze Me (Fresh Sound, 1957)
- Buddy Greco .I Like It Swinging (Epic, 1962)
