= Nat Pierce =

American jazz pianist, composer and arranger

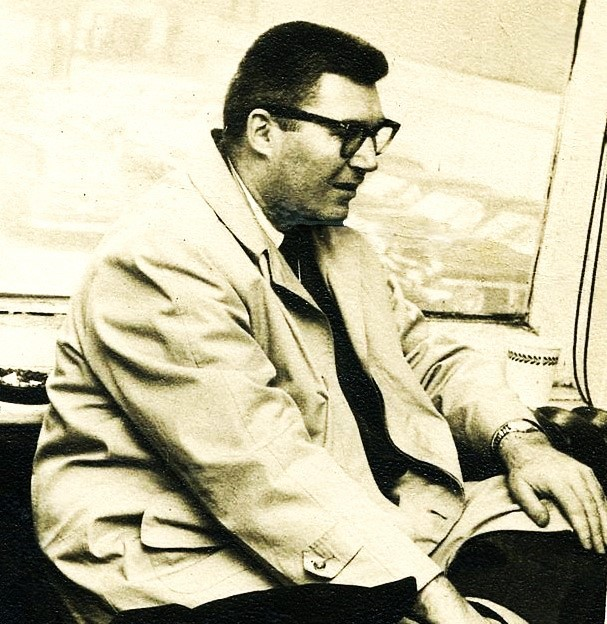
- Nat Pierce, 1961

Background information
- Born: Nathaniel Pierce Blish, Jr. July 16, 1925; Somerville, Massachusetts, U.S.
- Died: June 10, 1992 (aged 66) Los Angeles, California, U.S.
- Genres: Jazz
- Occupations: Musician, composer
- Instrument: Piano
- Labels: RCA Victor, Concorde Jazz

Nathaniel Pierce Blish Jr., known professionally as Nat Pierce (July 16, 1925 – June 10, 1992) was an American jazz pianist and prolific composer and arranger, perhaps best known for being pianist and arranger for the Woody Herman band from 1951 to 1955. Pieces by Pierce were predominantly created for use in big bands.

== Biography ==
Pierce was born in Somerville, Massachusetts. United States. Following schooling at the New England Conservatory and working as an amateur musician in the Boston area, Pierce then led his own band which featured Charlie Mariano from 1949 to 1951. After working with Woody Herman from 1951 to 1966 as chief arranger and assistant road manager, Pierce took residence in New York City and freelanced with musicians such as Pee Wee Russell, Lester Young, Emmett Berry and Ruby Braff.

From 1957 to 1959, Pierce led a band off and on which featured Buck Clayton, Gus Johnson and Paul Quinichette. He recorded with a number of other well-known musicians as well, including Quincy Jones, Coleman Hawkins and Pee Wee Russell. Pierce was noted for his ability to play piano in the Basie style and appeared on many releases by Basie sidemen. Pierce also arranged the music for The Sound of Jazz, a 1954 CBS television special hosted by John Crosby. Together with Frank Capp he founded the Capp/Pierce Juggernaut Band in 1975, which performed in to the 1990s.

Pierce died of complications from an abdominal infection in Los Angeles, California.

== Discography ==
=== As leader ===
As Nat Pierce and His Orchestra

- Kansas City Memories (Coral, 1957)
- The Nat Pierce Orchestra – Big Band At The Savoy (RCA, 1958)

With Frank Capp

- Frank Capp & Nat Pierce: Juggernaut (Concord Jazz, 1976)
- The Capp-Pierce Juggernaut: Live at the Century Plaza with Joe Williams (Concord Jazz, 1978)
- The Frank Capp-Nat Pierce Orchestra: Juggernaut Strikes Again! with Ernie Andrews (Concord Jazz, 1982)
- The Capp-Pierce Juggernaut: Live at the Alley Cat with Ernestine Anderson (Concord Jazz, 1987)

=== As sideman ===
With Louis Bellson

- Drummer's Holiday (Verve, 1958)
- The Louis Bellson Explosion (Pablo, 1975)

With Ruby Braff

- The Ruby Braff Octet with Pee Wee Russell & Bobby Henderson at Newport (Verve, 1957)

With Benny Carter

- 'Live and Well in Japan! (Pablo Live, 1978)

With Al Cohn

- The Natural Seven (RCA Victor, 1955)

With Freddie Green

- Mr. Rhythm (RCA Victor, 1955)

With Coleman Hawkins

- The Saxophone Section (World Wide, 1958)
- Jazz Reunion (Candid, 1961) with Pee Wee Russell

With Johnny Hodges

- Triple Play (RCA Victor, 1967)

With Joe Newman

- All I Wanna Do Is Swing (RCA Victor, 1955)
- Salute to Satch (RCA Victor, 1956)
- Counting Five in Sweden (Metronome, 1958)

With Specs Powell

- Movin' In (Roulette, 1957)

With Paul Quinichette

- For Basie (Prestige, 1957)
- Basie Reunion (Prestige, 1958)
- Like Basie! (United Artists, 1959)

With Buddy Tate

- Unbroken (MPS, 1970)

With Eddie "Cleanhead" Vinson

- Clean Head's Back in Town (Bethlehem, 1957)

=== As arranger ===
With Count Basie

- The Count! (Clef, 1952 [1955])
- Dance Session Album #2 (Clef, 1954)

With Bob Brookmeyer

- Kansas City Revisited (United Artists, 1958)

With Woody Herman

- Woody Herman–1963 (Philips, 1963)

With Quincy Jones

- The Birth of a Band! (Mercury, 1959)
