= Mr. Rhythm =

Studio album by Freddie Green
- Released: 1956
- Recorded: December 18, 1955
- Studio: Webster Hall, New York City
- Genre: Jazz
- Length: 38:45
- Label: RCA Victor
- Producer: Jack Lewis

Freddie Green chronology
Mr. Rhythm (1956)	Rhythm Willie (1975)

Mr. Rhythm is the sole album led by jazz guitarist Freddie Green. The album was recorded in late 1955 for RCA Victor.

== Reception ==
Professional ratings
Review scores
Source	Rating
Allmusic	3/5 stars

The Allmusic review by Ronnie D. Lankford, Jr. stated "This album shows him to be a fine leader who is happy to remain in his role as rhythm guitarist. For fans of Green, and for those who enjoy swinging jazz with great soloists, Mr. Rhythm is a fine release."

== Track listing ==
All tracks are written by Freddie Green except where noted.

No.	Title	Length
1.	"Up in the Blues"	2:36
2.	"Down for the Double"	4:01
3.	"Back and Forth"	2:20
4.	"Free and Easy"	3:27
5.	"Learnin' the Blues" (Delores Vicki Silvers)	3:31
6.	"Feed Bag"	3:01
7.	"Something's Got to Give"	2:55
8.	"Easy Does It" (Sy Oliver, Trummy Young)	3:46
9.	"Little Red"	2:11
10.	"Swinging Back"	3:25
11.	"A Date with Ray"	4:55
12.	"When You Wish Upon a Star" (Leigh Harline, Ned Washington)	2:37

== Personnel ==
- Freddie Green – guitar
- Joe Newman – trumpet
- Henry Coker – trombone
- Al Cohn – tenor saxophone, clarinet
- Nat Pierce – piano
- Milt Hinton – double bass
- Osie Johnson – drums
- Jo Jones – drums
