= O'Donel Levy =

American guitarist (1945–2016)

- Born: September 20, 1945; Baltimore, Maryland, U.S.
- Died: March 14, 2016 (aged 70)
- Genres: Rhythm and blues; funk; jazz
- Occupation: Musician
- Instrument: Guitar
- Labels: Groove Merchant; Lester Radio Corporation; ILM; Room 302

O'Donel "Butch" Levy (September 20, 1945 – March 14, 2016) was a rhythm & blues, funk and jazz guitarist from Baltimore, Maryland. He was brother of session drummer Stafford Levy.

Levy studied music at the Peabody Institute at Johns Hopkins University in Baltimore. He moved to New York City and toured with George Benson and Jimmy McGriff.

Levy released his debut album, Black Velvet, in 1971 on Groove Merchant. This was followed by a live album Concert: Friday the 13th - Cook County Jail, recorded at the Cook County Jail in Chicago in 1972. Levy performed as a member of the Jimmy McGriff quintet.

Levy's second album Breeding of Mind (Groove Merchant, 1972) crossed the genres of jazz, funk, and pop. He recorded it with Charles Covington, Chester Thompson, and Eric Ward, with arrangements by Manny Albam. His fourth album Simba (1973) was arranged by Albam, produced by Sonny Lester, and recorded with Warren Bernhardt, Cecil Bridgewater, Eddie Daniels, Jon Faddis, Steve Gadd, Tony Levin, Lew Soloff, and Bill Watrous. His fifth album Everything I Do Gonna Be Funky (1974) drew attention because of its risqué album cover.

== Discography ==
- Black Velvet (Groove Merchant, 1971)
- Breeding of Mind (Groove Merchant, 1972)
- Dawn of a New Day (Groove Merchant, 1973)
- Simba (Groove Merchant, 1974)
- Everything I Do Gonna Be Funky (Groove Merchant, 1974)
- Windows (Groove Merchant, 1976)
- Time Has Changed (LRC, 1977)
- Through a Song (ILM, 1982)
- Asia Beat (O'Donel Levy Productions, 2002 or 2004)
- In the Name of Love (Room 302, 2005)
- Hands of Fire (a compilation of this 1st and his 4th album).

=== As sideman ===
With Jimmy McGriff

- Black Pearl (Blue Note, 1971)
- Jimmy McGriff, Junior Parker (United Artists, 1972)
- Concert: Friday the 13th - Cook County Jail (Groove Merchant, 1973)
- Giants of the Organ Come Together (Groove Merchant, 1973)
- Giants of the Organ in Concert (Groove Merchant, 1973)

With others

- Ethel Ennis, 10 Sides of Ethel Ennis (BASF, 1973)
- Groove Holmes, New Groove (Groove Merchant, 1974)
- Herbie Mann, See Through Spirits (Atlantic, 1985)
- Norman Connors, Passion (Capitol, 1988)
- Eldee Young, Ernie Watts, Isaac "Redd" Holt, Jeremy Monteiro, Blues for the Saxophone Club (Golden String, 1996)
