= Eddie Vinson =

American saxophonist and blues shouter (1917–1988)

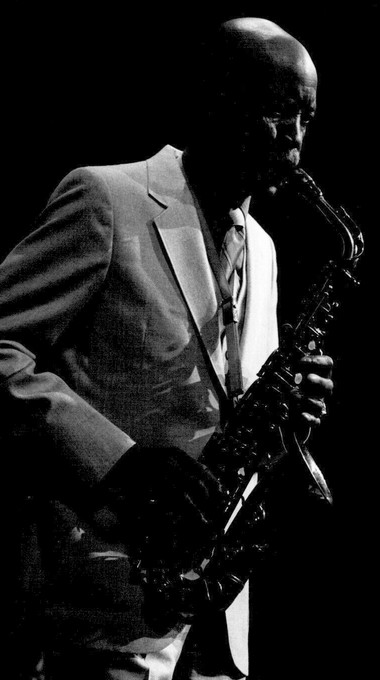
- Vinson in May 1980.

Background information
- Also known as: Eddie "Cleanhead" Vinson
- Born: Edward L. Vinson Jr. December 18, 1917; Houston, Texas, U.S.
- Died: July 2, 1988 (aged 70) Los Angeles, California, U.S.
- Genres: Jump blues, R&B, jazz
- Occupations: Saxophonist, singer, composer
- Years active: 1930s–1988
- Labels: King Records, Mercury, Black & Blue, ABC-BluesWay, Muse

Eddie "Cleanhead" Vinson (born Edward L. Vinson Jr.; December 18, 1917 – July 2, 1988) was an American jump blues, jazz, bebop and R&B alto saxophonist and blues shouter. He was nicknamed "Cleanhead" after an incident in which his hair was accidentally removed by lye contained in a hair-straightening product, necessitating shaving it off; enamoured of the look, Vinson maintained a shaved head thereafter. Music critic Robert Christgau has called Vinson "one of the cleanest, and nastiest, blues voices you'll ever hear."

== Biography ==
Vinson was born in Houston, Texas. He started out with Milton Larkin's orchestra in the 1930s. At various times, he was with Tom Archia, while other members of the band included Cedric Haywood and Wild Bill Davis. He then played for Big Bill Broonzy. During the 1940s, he was with the Cootie Williams Orchestra. He recorded such tunes as "Cherry Red".

There is some controversy over who composed "Four".

He died aged 70 in 1988, from a heart attack while undergoing chemotherapy, in Los Angeles, California.

== Discography ==
Year	Title	Notes	Genre	Label
1957	Clean Head's Back in Town	with Joe Newman, Henry Coker, Bill Graham, Frank Foster, Paul Quinichette, Charlie Rouse, Charles Fowlkes, Nat Pierce, Freddie Green, Turk Van Lake, Ed Jones, Gus Johnson, Ed Thigpen	Blues, Jazz	Bethlehem; Charly
1962	Back Door Blues	with Cannonball Adderley Quintet; some tracks and alternate takes released as Cleanhead & Cannonball on Landmark	Blues, Jazz	Riverside; Fresh Sound
1967	Cherry Red	with Mike Bloomfield	Blues	ABC/Bluesway; One Way
1969	Kidney Stew is Fine	with T-Bone Walker and Jay McShann; also released as Wee Baby Blues on Black & Blue	Jump Blues, Swing Jazz	Delmark
1969 [1984]	Live! in France	with Jay McShann	Jump Blues, Swing Jazz	Black & Blue
1970	The Original Cleanhead	with Artie Butler, David Cohen, Joe Pass, Arthur Wright, Earl Palmer, Plas Johnson	Blues	Bluestime/Flying Dutchman; Ace
1971	You Can't Make Love Alone	Live at the 1971 Montreux Jazz Festival	Blues	Mega/Flying Dutchman
1974 [1975]	Jamming the Blues	Live in Montreux	Blues	Black Lion
1978	The "Clean" Machine	with Lloyd Glenn	Blues, Jazz	Muse
1978 [1981]	Live at Sandy's (Eddie "Cleanhead" Vinson and the Muse All Stars)	with Arnett Cobb and Buddy Tate	Jump Blues, Swing Jazz	Muse 5208
1978 [1984]	Hold It Right There! (Eddie "Cleanhead" Vinson and the Muse All Stars)	with Arnett Cobb and Buddy Tate	Jump Blues, Swing Jazz	Muse 5243
1979 [2003]	Redux: Live at the Keystone Korner	with Larry Vuckovich	Blues, Jazz	Savant
1980	Kansas City Shout	with Count Basie and Big Joe Turner	Blues, Jazz	Pablo
1980	Fun in London	with John Burch, Lennie Bush, Bobby Orr	Blues, Jazz	JSP
1981	I Want a Little Girl	with Art Hillery, Cal Green, John Heard, Roy McCurdy, Martin Banks, Rashid Jamal Ali	Blues, Jazz	Pablo
1982	Mr. Cleanhead's Back in Town	with Stan Greig, Les Davidson, Paul Sealey, Martin Guy	Blues, Jazz	JSP
1982	Eddie "Cleanhead" Vinson & Roomful of Blues	with Roomful of Blues	Blues, Jump Blues	Muse; Rockbeat
1986	Blues in the Night Volume One: The Early Show	Live in Los Angeles with Etta James	Blues	Fantasy
1986 [1987]	The Late Show: Blues in the Night, Volume 2	Live in Los Angeles with Etta James	Blues	Fantasy
1987	Oscar Peterson + Harry Edison + Eddie "Cleanhead" Vinson	with Oscar Peterson and Harry "Sweets" Edison	Jazz	Pablo
1988	Cleanhead & Cannonball	with The Cannonball Adderley Quintet	Jazz	Landmark
1996	Kidney Stew (The Definitive Black & Blue Sessions)	with T-Bone Walker and Jay McShann	Jump Blues, Swing Jazz	Black & Blue
2003	Bald Headed Blues (His Complete King Recordings 1949-1952)	compilation	Jump Blues	Ace
2006	Honk for Texas (1942–1954)	with Cootie Williams and Big Jim Wynn; 4-CD box set; compilation	Jump Blues	JSP
2007	Blues, Boogie & Bebop – Meat's Too High	compilation of Fun in London and Mr. Cleanhead's Back in Town	Blues, Jazz	JSP
2008	Jumpin' the Blues (The Definitive Black & Blue Sessions)	with Jay McShann	Jump Blues, Swing Jazz	Black & Blue
2019	Mr. Cleanhead Blows His Greatest Hits (Selected Singles 1944-1950)	compilation	Jump Blues	Jasmine

With Oliver Nelson

- Swiss Suite (Flying Dutchman, 1971 [rel. 1972])

With Arnett Cobb and the Muse All Stars

- Live at Sandy's! (Muse 5191, 1978 [rel. 1980])
- More Arnett Cobb and the Muse All Stars (Live at Sandy's!) (Muse 5236, 1978 [rel. 1983])

With Buddy Tate and the Muse All Stars

- Live at Sandy's (Muse 5198, 1978 [rel. 1980])
- Hard Blowin' (Live at Sandy's) (Muse 5249, 1978 [rel. 1984])

With Helen Humes and the Muse All Stars

- Helen Humes and the Muse All Stars (Muse 5217, 1978 [rel. 1980]) - with Arnett Cobb and Buddy Tate
