= Cattin' with Coltrane and Quinichette =

Studio album by John Coltrane and Paul Quinichette
- Released: October 1959
- Recorded: May 17, 1957; Van Gelder Studio, Hackensack, NJ
- Genre: Jazz
- Length: 38:53 (Original LP); 46:58 (1990 CD reissue)
- Label: Prestige
- Producer: Bob Weinstock

Professional ratings
Review scores
Source	Rating
AllMusic	4/5 stars
The Penguin Guide to Jazz	3/4 stars
The Rolling Stone Jazz Record Guide	3/5 stars

Cattin' with Coltrane and Quinichette is a studio album by jazz musicians John Coltrane and Paul Quinichette released in October 1959 on Prestige Records. It was recorded at the studio of Rudy Van Gelder in Hackensack, New Jersey, and issued two years after the recording sessions took place, and after Coltrane's Prestige contract had ended.

== Track listing ==
All tracks composed by Mal Waldron, except where indicated.

=== Original LP release ===
No.	Title	Writer(s)	Length
1.	"Cattin'"		7:20
2.	"Sunday"	Chester Conn, Ned Miller, Jule Styne	6:58
3.	"Exactly Like You"	Jimmy McHugh, Dorothy Fields	6:45
4.	"Anatomy"		8:48
5.	"Vodka"		9:02
Total length:			38:53

=== Bonus track on 1990 CD reissue ===
No.	Title	Writer(s)	Length
6.	"Tea for Two"	Vincent Youmans, Irving Caesar	8:05
Total length:			46:58

== Personnel ==
- John Coltrane – tenor saxophone (except on #3 & #6)
- Paul Quinichette – tenor saxophone
- Julian Euell – double bass
- Ed Thigpen – drums
- Mal Waldron – piano
