= Chapter One: Latin America =

Studio album by Gato Barbieri
- Released: October 1973
- Recorded: April 1973; Music Hall, S.A.C.I.S.I, Buenos Aires (#1–4); Odeon Studios, Rio de Janeiro (#5)
- Genre: Free jazz, Latin jazz, world music
- Length: 42:51
- Label: Impulse! AS-9248
- Producer: Ed Michel

Gato Barbieri chronology
Bolivia (1973)	Chapter One: Latin America (1973)	Chapter Two: Hasta Siempre (1973)

Chapter One: Latin America is a 1973 album by Gato Barbieri. It was recorded and issued in 1973 on Impulse! Records as AS-9248. The album was re-released in 1997 as part of Latino America, a double CD that also included the album Chapter Two: Hasta Siempre along with unreleased tracks.

== Reception ==
In Creem magazine, Robert Christgau said like Barbieri's previous album Bolivia, Chapter One: Latin America is a "recommended introduction to the only jazzman this side of Miles Davis to translate avant-garde into semi-popular without sounding venal". The AllMusic review awarded the album 4½ stars, stating that "this album, like its remaining chapters, makes up one of the great all but forgotten masterpieces in 1970s jazz".

Professional ratings
Review scores
Source	Rating
AllMusic	4.5/5 stars
The Penguin Guide to Jazz Recordings	3/4 stars
The Rolling Stone Jazz Record Guide	4/5 stars

== Track listing ==
1. "Encuentros" 12:28
2. "India" 8:58
3. "La China Leoncia Arreo La Correntinada Trajo Entre La Muchachada La Flor De La Juventud" 13:33
  - Part 1 2:28
  - Part 2 2:45
  - Part 3 4:32
  - Part 4 3:53
4. "Nunca Mas" 5:25
5. "To Be Continued" 2:27

All songs by Gato Barbieri, except India by J. Asunción Flores / M. Ortiz Guerrero.

== Personnel ==
- Gato Barbieri - tenor saxophone (1–5)
- Raul Mercado - quena (1, 2, 3)
- Amadeo Monges - Indian harp (1, 2, 3)
- Ricardo Lew - Electric guitar (1, 3)
- Quelo Palacios - acoustic guitar (1, 2, 3)
- Isoca Fumero - charango (1, 3)
- Antonio Pantoja - anapa, erke, siku, quena, erkencho (1, 2, 3)
- Adalberto Cevasco - Fender bass (1, 2, 3, 4)
- Dino Saluzzi - bandoneon (4)
- Domingo Cura - bombo legüero (Argentinian drums) (1, 2, 3)
- Pocho Lapouble - drums (1, 3)
- Jorge Padin - percussion (1, 3)
- El Zurdo Roizner - percussion (1, 2, 3)
- Osvaldo Bellingieri - piano (4)
