= Pku =

Armenian musical instrument

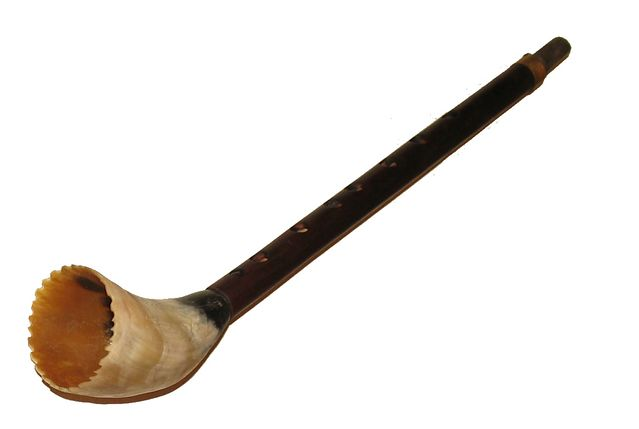
The pku.

The pku, alternatively spelled pzuk,(in Armenian “Պկու”) is an Armenian musical instrument, similar to a clarinet. It has been called the national instrument of Armenia. The pku is a single-reed aerophone with seven holes and a one octave range with the open cone of a bull horn at one end.

== See also ==
- Erkencho
- Erke
- Shofar
