= Chapter Two: Hasta Siempre =

Studio album by Gato Barbieri
- Released: 1974
- Recorded: April 17 & 28; October 16–17, 1973
- Genre: Jazz
- Length: 39:04
- Label: Impulse!
- Producer: Ed Michel

Gato Barbieri chronology
Chapter One: Latin America (1973)	Chapter Two: Hasta Siempre (1974)	Chapter Three: Viva Emiliano Zapata (1974)

Chapter Two: Hasta Siempre is a studio album by Argentine tenor saxophonist and composer Gato Barbieri. It was released in 1974 by Impulse! Records. The album was re-released in 1997 as part of Latino America, a double CD that also included the album Chapter One: Latin America along with unreleased tracks.

== Reception ==
The Allmusic review by Thom Jurek awarded the album 4 stars stating "It's a stunner and will leave any interested listener breathless by its finish".

Professional ratings
Review scores
Source	Rating
Allmusic	4/5 stars
The Rolling Stone Jazz Record Guide	3/5 stars

== Track listing ==
All compositions by Gato Barbieri, except Juana Azurduy by Félix Luna / Ariel Ramírez

1. "Encontros, Part One" - 2:16
2. "Encontros, Part Three" - 4:16
3. "Latino America" - 5:30
4. "Marissea" - 7:39
5. "Para Nosotros" - 8:02
6. "Juana Azurduy" - 11:21
  - Recorded in at Music Hall Studios in Buenos Aires, Argentina on April 17, 1973 (track 6); at Odeon Studios in Rio de Janeiro, Brazil on April 28, 1973 (tracks 1, 2 & 4), and at The Village Recorder in Los Angeles, California, on October 16, 1973 (track 3) and October 17, 1973 (track 5).

== Personnel ==
- Gato Barbieri - tenor saxophone
- Helio Delmiro, Quelo Palacios - acoustic guitar
- Ricardo Lew - electric guitar
- Daudeth De Azevado - cavaco
- Adalberto Cevasco, Jim Hughart, Novelli - electric bass
- Paulo Antonio Braga, Pocho Lapuble - drums
- Jorge Padin, El Zurdo Roizner - percussion
- Mayuto Correa - conga, triangle
- Domingo Cura - bombo legüero
- Isoca Fumero - charango
- Raul Mercado - quena
- Amadeo Monges - arpa India
- Antonio Pantoja - anapa, erke, siku, quena, erkencho
- Unidentified percussion section - surdo, tambourine, pandeiro, cuica, agogô
