= Donald Ashworth =

Don Ashworth
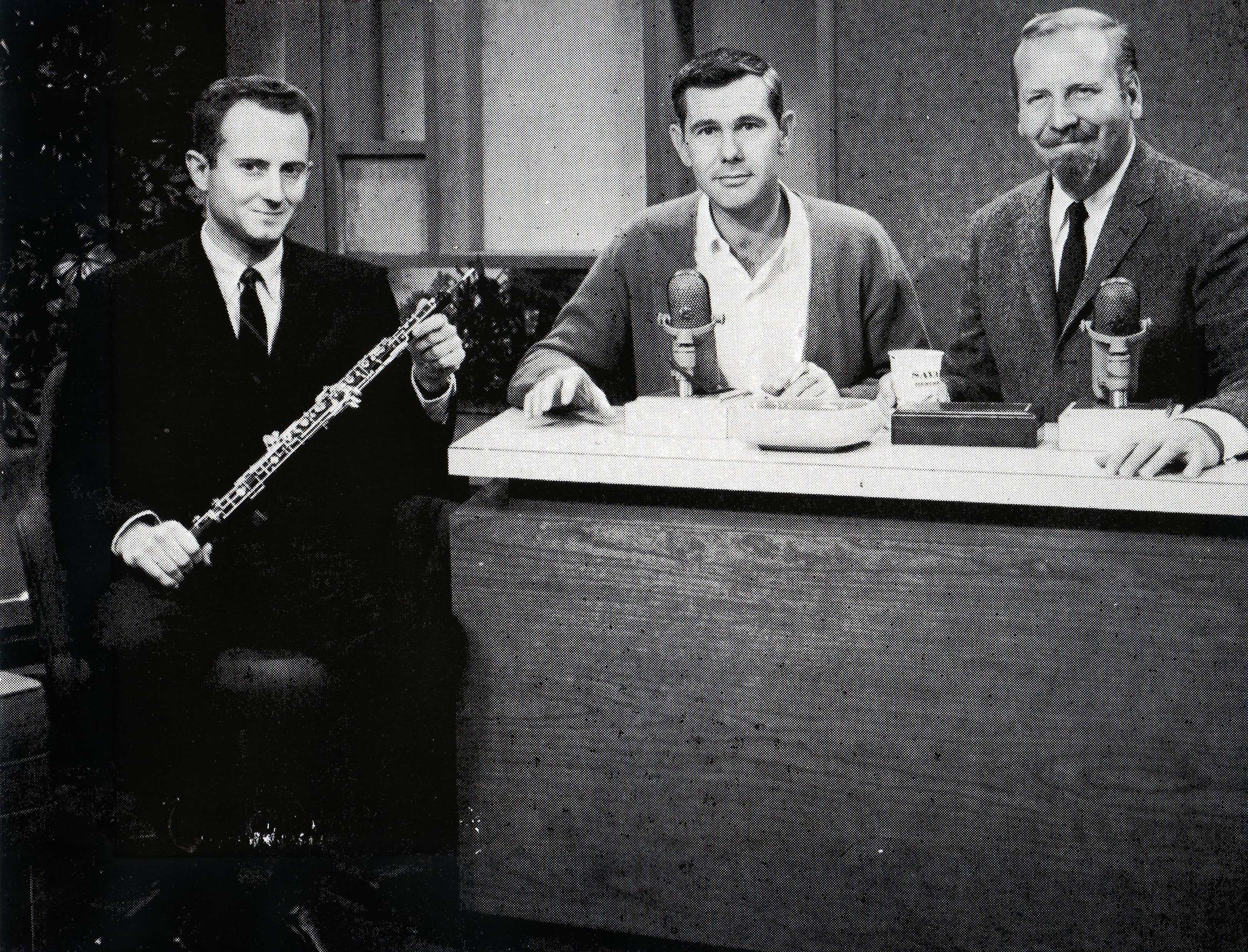
- Don Ashworth (L) with Johnny Carson and Skitch Henderson (1962)

Background information
- Born: Donald William Ashworth; March 16, 1931 (age 95)
- Origin: Pittsburgh, Pennsylvania, U.S.
- Genre: jazz
- Instruments: flute, saxophone, oboe, clarinet, ocarina, recorder
- Years active: 1955–1995
- Label: Group IV Recording

Donald William Ashworth (born March 16, 1931) is a musician who was a member of The Tonight Show Band for thirty years before retiring in 1995. Ashworth played woodwind instruments with the group starting from Johnny Carson's first week as host of The Tonight Show in October 1962 (when the band was referred to generically as The NBC Orchestra) until his final show on May 22, 1992. For its first 10 years, Carson's Tonight Show was based in New York City with occasional trips to Burbank, California; in May 1972, Ashworth moved from New York City to Southern California when the show moved permanently to Burbank. He was often seen on the show when Carson played "Stump the Band", where studio audience members asked the band to try to play obscure songs given only the title.

The Tonight Show had a live band for nearly all of its existence, and Ashworth played under three different band leaders: Skitch Henderson (who had previously led the band during Tonight Starring Steve Allen; see photo), followed briefly by Milton DeLugg, then from 1967 to 1992 by Doc Severinsen (with Tommy Newsom filling in for him when Doc was absent). While playing for The Tonight Show Band, he also played woodwinds for The Carol Burnett Show on CBS for 8 years. He also played for a variety of other television shows, including Dallas, Dynasty, Trapper John, M.D., Perry Como's Kraft Music Hall, and The Merv Griffin Show. Ashworth plays all types of flutes, saxophones, oboes, clarinets, recorders, and ocarina.

== Early career ==
Ashworth began his career in 1955 playing for the Sauter-Finegan Orchestra, led by two of the best arrangers of the big band era, Eddie Sauter and Bill Finegan, which one reviewer described as a "band which had enormous popularity in the Fifties but has all but vanished from public consciousness." The sound, which was post-Swing, was described as "too clever to be pop music, but too popular to be considered jazz, the records released between 1952 and 1958 by this band were very much a product of their time."

== 1960–1994 ==
Ashworth has played in numerous Broadway musicals, including Li'l Abner (870 shows), Do Re Mi, Goldilocks, and I Can Get It for You Wholesale. His concert work also included stints with the Benny Goodman and His Orchestra. His studio work includes well-known albums by artists such as Frank Sinatra, Barbra Streisand, Tony Bennett, and George Clinton. He also contributed to albums such as The Other Side of Abbey Road by guitarist George Benson (1969), Dawg Jazz/Dawg Grass by musician David Grisman (1983), Inner City Blues by saxophonist Grover Washington, Jr., and Mysterious Traveller by the band Weather Report. His oboe can be heard on Mel Brooks' 1991 film "Life Stinks."

== Discography ==
Particular People (Upstairs Records, 1981)

With Johnny Hodges

- Blue Notes (Verve, 1966)

With Gerry Mulligan

- Holliday with Mulligan (DRG, 1961 [1980]) with Judy Holliday

With Bernard Purdie

- Stand By Me (Whatcha See Is Whatcha Get) (Mega, 1971)

With Walter Wanderley

- When It Was Done (A&M/CTI, 1968)
