= Night Beat =

Night Beat or Nightbeat may refer to:

- Night Beat (1931 film), a film directed by George B. Seitz
- Night Beat (1947 film), a film directed by Harold Huth
- Night Beat (Sam Cooke album), 1963
- Night Beat (Hank Crawford album), 1989
- Night Beats, an American psychedelic/garage rock band
- Night Beat (U.S. radio program)
- Nightbeat (Transformers) a Transformers character
