= Summer Melody =

Summer Melody may refer to:

- Summer Melody, album by the Dutch band George Baker Selection 1977
- "Summer Melody", jazz instrumental from Shaft (Bernard Purdie album) 1971
- "Summer Melody", Japanese-language song by Yukari Tamura 2001

== See also ==
- "Die Sommermelodie" ("The Summer Melody") West-German entry in the Eurovision Song Contest 1974
