= Ray Alexander =

Ray Alexander may refer to:

- Ray Alexander (gridiron football) (born 1962), American football player
- Ray Alexander (musician) (1925–2002), jazz drummer and vibraphonist
- Ray Alexander Simons (1914–2004), also known as Ray Alexander, South African communist and trade unionist
