= Billy Nichols =

American guitarist and songwriter (1940–2025)

- Born: William Lee Nichols; April 30, 1940; Carrollton, Mississippi, U.S.
- Died: November 30, 2025 (aged 85)
- Genres: R&B; disco; pop; urban
- Occupations: Songwriter; composer; artist
- Instruments: Bass; guitar; drums; keyboards
- Years active: 1963–2025

William Lee Nichols (April 30, 1940 – November 30, 2025) was an American guitarist and soul songwriter from Carrollton, Mississippi. He was the writer of "Do It ('Til You're Satisfied)", a number two Billboard Hot 100 hit for the funk group B. T. Express in 1974.

== Early life ==
Nichols was one of nine children born to Laura Bell and Tom Sanders. Sanders was a farmer who played blues guitar in his spare time. Inspired by his father and blues musicians he heard on the radio, Nichols taught himself guitar.

Aged 14, Nichols' family moved to Springfield, Massachusetts, where Nichols played with various bands including a gospel group named The Bells of Harmony.

In 1963, Nichols joined Jimmy Vick and The Victors and recorded a single. The group was mentioned in Billboard and got some local radio airplay but by November, the group broke up.

== Career ==
In 1964, Nichols moved to Detroit and stayed with his uncle. He was hired by Motown Records where his first job was playing with Martha and the Vandellas. Nichols was also in the Motown Road Band led by Choker Campbell. In 1965 he became the musical director for Marvin Gaye.

Nichols first break as a songwriter came in 1966 when Billy Stewart took Nichols to the Chess Records in Chicago to record his song "To Love, to Love".

Becoming disenchanted with constant touring, Nichols moved to New York to lead the house band at the Crystal Ballroom. Billy Nichols and the Soul Swingers played at the Crystal Ballroom for about three years.

In 1971, Nichols led rehearsals on Galt MacDermot's Two Gentlemen of Verona musical play. Nichols continued to compose and had his first Billboard top twenty hit in 1972 when Millie Jackson recorded "Ask Me What You Want".

Nichols most successful period came working with B.T. Express. "Do It ('Til You're Satisfied)" was recorded and released in 1974. Nichols went on to write and produce other songs for the group such as "Can't Stop Groovin'" and "Shout It Out".

At the end of the 1970s, Nichols produced two rap records: Jimmy Spicer – "The Adventures of Super Rhymes" (Dazz, 1979) and Count Coolout – "Rhythm Rap Rock" (Boss Records, 1980).

== Death and legacy ==
Nichols died on November 30, 2025, at the age of 85.

Rappers such as Will Smith, Beanie Sigel, EPMD, Master P, Ice Cube, P. Diddy, Jay-Z, Ludacris, Dr. Dre, and De La Soul have sampled Nichols' music. A sample of his song "Do It", heard in the song entitled "Addictive" performed by recording artist Truth Hurts, won him two BMI awards for most urban airplay for the year 2002.

== Discography ==
- Shake A Leg (Sue, 1969)
- Treat Your Neighbor (Mercury 1970)
- Give Your Body up to the Music (West End Records, 1979)
- Diamond Ring (West End Records 1979)
- Whip Your Body (Whip It, Whip It, Whip It) (Boss Records)
- Love Stuff (Boss Records, 2003)
- One Day (At a Time) (Boss Records, 2014)

=== As sideman ===
With Bernard Purdie

- Purdie Good! (Prestige, 1971)
- Stand By Me (Whatcha See Is Whatcha Get) (Mega, 1971)
- Shaft (Prestige, 1971)
- Soul Is... Pretty Purdie (Flying Dutchman, 1972)
