= Hélio Delmiro =

Brazilian guitar player and composer (1947–2025)

Hélio Delmiro (May 20, 1947 – June 16, 2025) was a Brazilian guitar player and composer.

Delmiro started playing the guitar in early childhood. Thereafter, he played with many of the best Brazilian musicians, among whom were Moacyr Silva, Márcio Montarroyos, Luíz Eça, Elis Regina, Elza Soares and Elizeth Cardoso. With César Camargo Mariano, he recorded in 1981 the album Samambaia, which still holds as a landmark for Brazilian instrumental music.

Delmiro died in Brasília on June 16, 2025, at the age of 78, after a struggle with a urinary tract infection.

== Discography ==
- Emotiva (1980)
- Samambaia (1981) with César Camargo Mariano
- Chama (1984)
- Romã (1991)
- Symbiosis (1999) with Clare Fischer
- Violão Urbano (2002)
- Compassos (2004)

With Gato Barbieri

- Chapter Two: Hasta Siempre (Impulse! 1973–74)
