= Chapter Three: Viva Emiliano Zapata =

Studio album by Gato Barbieri
- Released: September 1974
- Recorded: June 25–26, 1974; Generation Sound Studios, New York
- Genre: Jazz
- Length: 34:54
- Label: Impulse! ASD-9279
- Producer: Ed Michel

Gato Barbieri chronology
Chapter Two: Hasta Siempre (1974)	Chapter Three: Viva Emiliano Zapata (1974)	Yesterdays (1974)

Chapter Three: Viva Emiliano Zapata is an album by Argentinian saxophonist and composer Gato Barbieri released on the Impulse! label.

== Reception ==
The AllMusic review by Thom Jurek called the album "a stellar recording, and of the four chapters in the series, the one most accessible to most jazz fans".

Professional ratings
Review scores
Source	Rating
AllMusic	4/5 stars
The Penguin Guide to Jazz Recordings	3/4 stars
The Rolling Stone Jazz Record Guide	4/5 stars

== Track listing ==
All compositions by Gato Barbieri except as indicated

1. "Milonga Triste" (Homero Manzi, Sebastian Piana) - 5:00
2. "Lluvia Azul" - 7:44
3. "El Sublime" - 5:51
4. "La Podrida" - 4:46
5. "Cuando Vuelva a Tu Lado (What a Difference a Day Makes)" (Stanley Adams, María Grever) - 5:27
6. "Viva Emiliano Zapata" - 6:06

The album was recorded on June 25 (tracks 1, 4) and June 26 (tracks 2–3, 5), 1974.

== Personnel ==
- Gato Barbieri - tenor saxophone
- Randy Brecker, Bob McCoy, Victor Paz - trumpet, flugelhorn
- Buddy Morrow - trombone
- Alan Raph - bass trombone
- Ray Alonge, Jim Buffington - French horn
- Howard Johnson - tuba, flugelhorn, bass clarinet, baritone saxophone
- Seldon Powell - piccolo, flute, alto flute, alto saxophone, baritone saxophone
- Eddie Martinez - piano, electric piano
- Paul Metzke - electric guitar
- George Davis - electric guitar, acoustic guitar
- Ron Carter - bass, electric bass
- Grady Tate - drums
- Ray Armando, Luis Mangual, Ray Mantilla, Portinho - Latin percussion
- Chico O'Farrill - arranger, conductor
