= The Hitman Blues Band =

American musical group (1989–present)

- The Hitman Blues Band logo

Background information
- Origin: New York City
- Genres: blues
- Years active: 1989–present
- Labels: Nerus Records
- Members: Russell Alexander, Mike Porter, Guy LaFountaine, Michael Snyder, John Kelly, Eric Altarac, Nick Clifford, Joanne Alexander, Nancy Hampton

The Hitman Blues Band are a New York City–based blues band, formed in 1989 by Russell Alexander, and have recorded six studio albums and one live album.

== Biography ==
The band's first album, Blooztown, was released in 2000 on Nerus Records and re-released in 2001 on Biograph. The album was recorded with Johnny Gale, Bobby Forester and Bernard Purdie. Alexander's father Ray guested on two songs.

The band's second album, Angel in the Shadows, released in 2003, was recorded with Gale, Richard Crooks, Seth Glassman, Kevin Rymer, Murray Weinstock, Greg "Clutch" Reilly, and Michael Snyder. The album was supported by a tour of the United Kingdom, with UK band Groove Juice as the support act. They also played the Eel Pie Club with Storm Warning as support.

In 2006 they released a live album, Live at Stonybrook University, which songs from their first two albums plus other originals. The album was recorded live on November 28, 2005, at the University Cafe at Stony Brook University and features Alexander, Rymer (keys), Mike Porter (bass) and Jay Sharkey (drums). Its release was followed by another UK tour.

The band's next album in 2009, Pale Rider, featured the live band (with Ed "The Hat" D'Alessio on drums). It was also the first time the band had recorded with a horn section, on the track "Miss Catherine". Hitman undertook its first European tour after this release.

In 2010, Alt-Strum Productions licensed "Two Minute Warning" from the Angel in the Shadows to be an add-on for the Rock Band 3 video game.

The band's fifth album, Blues Enough, released in 2013, featured the live band with the new drummer, Guy LaFountaine. It also featured a horn section consisting of Michael Snyder on all saxes, Eric Altarac on trumpet, and Al Alpert on trombone. Neil Alexander performed on harmonica on two cuts, "Life's Too Short" and "Blues Enough". Additionally, a female backup vocal section was used, composed of Joanne Alexander and Victoria Anyah.

The Hitman Blues Band resumed touring in the UK without the female backing singers. However, in 2014 they added Joanne Alexander and Nancy Hampton to the live lineup, singing backup.

In 2015, "Trouble On The Line" and "I'm Coming For You", both from the Pale Rider album, were used in the film Ghostline (the former in the beginning of the movie, and the latter during closing credits).

Their sixth album, The World Moves On, released in 2016, featured Alexander (guitar/vocals), Kevin Bents (keyboards), Mike Porter (bass), La Fontaine (drums), Mickey Vitale (tenor saxophone) and Nick Clifford (baritone saxophone). It has been described as a "celebration of the traditions of the Delta Blues mixed with the glorious groove of the Memphis and Chicago blues."

Additional tours of the UK and France followed, using the American lineup. However, in 2017 John Kelly replaced Vitale on tenor saxophone.

In June 2017, Hitman was featured on the cover of Blues in Britain.

Their seventh album, Not My Circus, Not My Monkey, was released on March 15, 2021. It featured Alexander (guitar/vocals), Kevin Bents (keyboards), Mike Porter (bass/backup vocals), La Fontaine (drums), Mickey Vitale (alto saxophone), John Kelly (tenor saxophone), Nick Clifford (baritone saxophone), Eric Altarac (trumpet), Mike Katzman (organ solo on "John The Revelator"), Adam Minkoff (organ on "No Place Like Home"), Joanne Alexander and Nancy Hampton on backup vocals.

== Discography ==
=== Albums ===
- Blooztown – Nerus Records (NR4429) (September 10, 2000)
- Angels in Shadows – Nerus Records (NR4481) (January 1, 2003)
- Live at Stonybrook University – Nerus Records (NR4483) (July 2, 2006)
- Pale Rider – Nerus Records (NR4485) (2009)
- Blues Enough – Nerus Records (NR4490) (June 2013)
- The World Moves On – Nerus Records (NR4491) (2016)
- Not My Circus, Not My Monkey – Nerus Records (NR4493) (2021)
