= Bob Cunningham (musician) =

American jazz bassist

Bob Cunningham (December 28, 1934 – April 1, 2017) was an American jazz bassist. Cunningham was born on December 28, 1934, in Cleveland. In the 1990s he was a member of The 3B's, with Bross Townsend and Bernard Purdie. He died in New York on April 1, 2017, at the age of 82.

== Discography ==
=== As leader ===
- 1985: Walking Bass (Nilva)

With The 3B's

- 1993: After Hours with The 3B's
- 1994: Soothin' n Groovin' with The 3B's

=== As sideman ===
With Gary Bartz

- Home! (Milestone, 1970)

With Walt Dickerson

- Impressions of a Patch of Blue (MGM, 1965)

With Frank Foster

- Fearless Frank Foster (Prestige, 1965)
- Soul Outing! (Prestige, 1966)

With Dizzy Gillespie

- An Electrifying Evening with the Dizzy Gillespie Quintet (Verve, 1961)

With Bill Hardman

- Saying Something (Savoy 1961)

With Freddie Hubbard

- Backlash (Atlantic, 1967)

With The Jazz Composer's Orchestra

- The Jazz Composer's Orchestra (JCOA, 1968)

With Yusef Lateef

- The Gentle Giant (Atlantic, 1972)
- Part of the Search (Atlantic, 1973)
- 10 Years Hence (Atlantic, 1974)
- The Doctor Is In... and Out (Atlantic, 1976)

With Junior Mance

- Harlem Lullaby (Atlantic, 1967)
- I Believe to My Soul (Atlantic, 1968)

With The New York Art Quartet

- Call It Art (Triple Point, 2013)

With Dakota Staton

- Ms. Soul (Groove Merchant, 1974)

With Leon Thomas

- The Leon Thomas Album (Flying Dutchman, 1970)
