= Mr. Chips (album) =

Studio album by Hank Crawford
- Released: 1986
- Genre: Jazz; Soul
- Label: Milestone; M-9149/MCD-9149-2
- Producer: Bob Porter

Hank Crawford chronology
Soul Survivors (1986)	Mr. Chips (1986)	Steppin' Up (1987)

Professional ratings
Review scores
Source	Rating
The Penguin Guide to Jazz Recordings	2/4 stars

Mr. Chips is a soul-jazz album by saxophonist Hank Crawford, released in 1986 on Milestone Records.

== Track listing ==
1. "Endless Love" (Lionel Richie) 7:08
2. "You Send Me" (L.C. Cooke) 6:18
3. "Mr. Chips" (Crawford) 4:28
4. "Stand by Me" (Ben E. King/Jerry Leiber/Mike Stoller) 5:4
5. "Let's Fall In Love All Over Again" 4:21
6. "Bedtime" 8:24

== Personnel ==
- Hank Crawford - alto saxophone
- Leon Thomas – vocals on "You Send Me"
- David “Fathead” Newman - tenor saxophone, flute
- Howard Johnson - baritone saxophone
- Randy Brecker - trumpet
- Alan Rubin - trumpet
- Cornell Dupree - guitar
- Richard Tee - keyboards
- Wilbur Bascomb - bass
- Bernard Purdie - drums
