= On the Blue Side =

Studio album by Hank Crawford and Jimmy McGriff
- Released: 1990
- Recorded: April 4 & August 9, 1989
- Studio: Van Gelder Studio, Englewood Cliffs, NJ
- Genre: Jazz
- Length: 40:32
- Label: Milestone; M-9177/MCD-9177-2
- Producer: Bob Porter

Hank Crawford chronology
| Night Beat (1989) | On the Blue Side (1990) | Groove Master (1990) |

Jimmy McGriff chronology
| Blue to the 'Bone (1988) | On the Blue Side (1990) | You Ought to Think About Me (1990) |

On the Blue Side is an album by saxophonist Hank Crawford and organist Jimmy McGriff recorded in 1989 and released on the Milestone label the following year.

== Reception ==
Professional ratings
Review scores
| Source | Rating |
|---|---|
| Allmusic | 4/5 stars |
| The Penguin Guide to Jazz Recordings | 2.5/4 stars |

Allmusic's Scott Yanow said: "Hank Crawford sounds at his best when he has strong melodies to wrap his tone around, and when he can dig into the blues. Both aspects are true during this quartet outing which he co-leads with organist Jimmy McGriff... an excellent soul jazz effort overall".

== Track listing ==
1. "Any Day Now" (Burt Bacharach, Bob Hilliard) – 7:15
2. "Jimmy's Groove" (Jimmy McGriff) – 4:44
3. "The Glory of Love" (Billy Hill) – 5:06
4. "You're the One" (Adolph Smith) – 5:24
5. "Tuff" (Ace Cannon) – 4:10
6. "Jumpin' with Symphony Sid" (Lester Young) – 4:57
7. "Gee, Baby, Ain't I Good to You" (Andy Razaf, Don Redman) – 3:30
8. "Hank's Groove" (Hank Crawford) – 5:26

== Personnel ==
- Hank Crawford – alto saxophone
- Jimmy McGriff – organ
- Jimmy Ponder – guitar
- Vance James − drums
