= Change Up the Groove =

Album by Roy Ayers Ubiquity

Studio album by Roy Ayers Ubiquity
- Released: 1974
- Studio: Electric Lady (New York City)
- Genre: Jazz-funk
- Length: 35:28
- Label: Polydor
- Producer: Jerry Schoenbaum

Roy Ayers Ubiquity chronology
Virgo Red (1973)	Change Up the Groove (1974)	A Tear to a Smile (1975)

Professional ratings
Review scores
Source	Rating
AllMusic	4/5 stars

Change Up the Groove is a studio album by Roy Ayers Ubiquity. It was released in 1974 through Polydor Records. The recording sessions for the album took place at Electric Lady Studios in New York City. The album peaked at number 156 on the Billboard 200 albums chart.

== Track listing ==
No.	Title	Writer(s)	Length
1.	"Change Up the Groove"	Roy Ayers	4:36
2.	"Sensitize"	Carl Clay; Wayne Garfield	5:00
3.	"Don't You Worry 'bout a Thing"	Stevie Wonder	4:13
4.	"Theme from Mash"	Johnny Mandel; Mike Altman	4:59
5.	"Fikisha (To Help Someone Arrive)"	Roy Ayers	2:48
6.	"Feel Like Makin' Love"	Eugene McDaniels	5:20
7.	"When Is Real, Real?"	Roy Ayers; Maureen Kinnard	3:41
8.	"The Boogie Back"	Harry Whitaker	4:40
Total length:			35:28

== Personnel ==
- Roy Ayers – vocals, vibraphone, arrangement
- Wayne Garfield – vocals, arrangement (tracks: 2, 8)
- James "BJ" Boston – backing vocals
- Monica Burruss – backing vocals
- Terry Burrell – backing vocals
- Harry Whitaker – electric piano, clavinet, piano
- Leon Pendarvis – electric piano, clavinet, piano
- Pat Rebillot – ARP synthesizer
- Calvin Brown – guitar
- Gil Silva – rhythm guitar
- Jerry M. Friedman – rhythm guitar
- Wilbur Bascomb Jr. – bass
- Wilby Fletcher – drums
- Bernard Lee "Pretty" Purdie – drums
- Chano O'Ferral – congas, percussion
- George Braith – sopranino saxophone

Technical

- Jerry Schoenbaum – producer
- Ron Johnsen – recording
- Harriet Millman – artwork
- Greg Vaughn – photography
- Yvonne D. Lawton – photography

== Chart history ==
Chart (1974)	Peak position
US Billboard 200	156
