= Bolivia (Gato Barbieri album) =

Live album by Gato Barbieri
- Released: 1973
- Recorded: 1973; New York City
- Genre: Jazz
- Length: 36:01
- Label: Flying Dutchman FD 10158
- Producer: Bob Thiele

Gato Barbieri chronology
Last Tango in Paris (1972)	Bolivia (1973)	Chapter One: Latin America (1973)

Bolivia is a live album by Argentinian jazz composer and saxophonist Gato Barbieri featuring performances recorded in New York in 1973 and first released on the Flying Dutchman label.

== Reception ==
Professional ratings
Review scores
Source	Rating
The Penguin Guide to Jazz Recordings	3/4 stars
Christgau's Record Guide	A−

In Creem magazine, Robert Christgau gave Bolivia an "A−" and said he liked it slightly better than Barbieri's other 1973 album Chapter One: Latin America "because I prefer Lonnie Liston Smith and Barbieri's other Afro-American sidemen to his less disciplined all-South American band." The Allmusic site awarded the album 4 stars stating, "Ultimately, Bolivia is a sensual, musically adept, and groundbreaking recording, which offered Barbieri a chance to come in from the avant-garde before heading back to the fringes with the Latin America series. A fine effort that is finally getting the notoriety it deserves".

== Track listing ==
All compositions by Gato Barbieri except as indicated

1. "Merceditas" – 9:07
2. "Eclypse/Michellina" (Traditional/Barbieri) – 6:24
3. "Bolivia" – 7:46
4. "Niños" – 7:14
5. "Vidala Triste" (Barbieri, Michelle Barbieri) – 5:30

== Personnel ==
- Gato Barbieri – tenor saxophone, flute, vocals
- Lonnie Liston Smith – piano, electric piano
- John Abercrombie – guitar, electric guitar
- Jean-François Jenny-Clark – bass
- Stanley Clarke – electric bass
- Bernard Purdie – drums
- Airto Moreira, Gene Golden, James Mtume, Moulay "Ali" Hafid – percussion
