= Purdie Good! =

Studio album by Bernard Purdie
- Released: 1971
- Recorded: January 11, 1971
- Studio: Van Gelder, Englewood Cliffs
- Genre: Jazz
- Length: 35:14
- Label: Prestige; PR 10013
- Producer: Bob Porter

Bernard Purdie chronology
Soul Drums (1967)	Purdie Good! (1971)	Stand By Me (Whatcha See Is Whatcha Get) (1971)

Purdie Good! is an album led by jazz drummer Bernard Purdie which was recorded for the Prestige label in 1971.

== Reception ==
Professional ratings
Review scores
Source	Rating
Allmusic	2.5/5 stars
The Rolling Stone Jazz Record Guide	2/5 stars

Stewart Mason of Allmusic states, "it seems like Purdie's much-vaunted ability to play well in just about any style thrown at him is almost a liability on 1971's Purdie Good... the covers are competent enough, but why listen to them when the originals are far superior? At best, the album only barely lives up to its title".

== Track listing ==
All compositions by Bernard Purdie except where noted

1. "Cold Sweat" (James Brown, Alfred "Pee Wee" Ellis) – 5:30
2. "Montego Bay" (Bobby Bloom, Jeff Barry) – 5:40
3. "Purdie Good" – 6:20
4. "Wasteland" – 6:10
5. "Everybody's Talkin'" (Fred Neil) – 5:14
6. "You Turn Me On" – 6:20

== Personnel ==
- Bernard Purdie – drums
- Tippy Larkin – trumpet
- Charlie Brown, Warren Daniels – tenor saxophone
- Harold Wheeler – electric piano
- Ted Dunbar, Billy Nichols – guitar
- Gordon Edwards – electric bass
- Norman Pride – congas

=== Production ===
- Bob Porter – producer
- Rudy Van Gelder – engineer
