= You Ought to Think About Me =

Studio album by Jimmy McGriff
- Released: 1990
- Recorded: March 1 and 2, 1990
- Studio: Clinton Recording Studios, NYC
- Genre: Jazz
- Length: 57:52
- Label: Headfirst; A 379-2
- Producer: Bill Easley

Jimmy McGriff chronology
| On the Blue Side (1989) | You Ought to Think About Me (1990) | In a Blue Mood (1991) |

You Ought to Think About Me is an album by organist Jimmy McGriff recorded in 1990 and released on the Headfirst label.

== Reception ==
Professional ratings
Review scores
| Source | Rating |
|---|---|
| Allmusic | 2.5/5 stars |

Allmusic's Scott Yanow said: "Although Jimmy McGriff temporarily switched labels from Milestone to Headfirst in 1990, his brand of swinging funk and blues-oriented jazz was virtually unchanged ... The results are predictably excellent".

== Track listing ==
All compositions by Jimmy McGriff except where noted

1. "The Way You Look Tonight" (Jerome Kern, Dorothy Fields) – 6:01
2. "You Ought to Think About Me" – 4:15
3. "America the Beautiful" (Samuel A. Ward, Katharine Lee Bates) – 3:13
4. "One O'Clock/C-Jam" (Count Basie/Duke Ellington) – 7:11
5. "Over the Rainbow" (Harold Arlen, Yip Harburg) – 5:13
6. "Ain't No Mountain High Enough" (Nickolas Ashford, Valerie Simpson) – 3:54
7. "McGriff's Blues" (Rodney Jones) – 4:44
8. "One Minute 'Til Six" (Bill Easley) – 8:56
9. "Evita" – 5:17
10. "Goin' Home" (Jones) – 9:10

== Personnel ==
- Jimmy McGriff – Hammond/Goff organ, piano
- Stanton Davis – trumpet
- Dennis Wilson – trombone
- Bill Easley – alto saxophone, tenor saxophone, soprano saxophone
- Rodney Jones – guitar, Roland GR-50 strings, bass, effects
- David Jackson, Jr. – bass
- Bernard Purdie − drums
