= Steppin' Up =

Studio album by Hank Crawford and Jimmy McGriff
- Released: 1987
- Recorded: June 15 and 16, 1987
- Studio: Van Gelder Studio, Englewood Cliffs, NJ
- Genre: Jazz
- Length: 44:48
- Label: Milestone; M-9153/MCD-9153-2
- Producer: Bob Porter

Hank Crawford chronology
Mr. Chips (1986)	Steppin' Up (1987)	Night Beat (1989)

Jimmy McGriff chronology
The Starting Five (1986)	Steppin' Up (1987)	Blue to the 'Bone (1988)

Steppin' Up is an album by saxophonist Hank Crawford and organist Jimmy McGriff recorded in 1987 and released on the Milestone label.

== Reception ==
Professional ratings
Review scores
Source	Rating
Allmusic	4/5 stars
The Penguin Guide to Jazz Recordings	2.5/4 stars

Allmusic's Scott Yanow said: "the results are predictably soulful and pleasing... this is a highly enjoyable outing, easily recommended for soul-jazz fans".

== Track listing ==
1. "River's Invitation" (Percy Mayfield) – 8:37
2. "The Real Deal" (Hank Crawford) – 9:08
3. "Tippin' In" (Bobby Smith, Marty Symes) – 5:22
4. "Vicki" (Jimmy McGriff) – 6:10
5. "Be Anything (but Be Mine)" (Irving Gordon) – 6:34
6. "Steppin' Up" (McGriff) – 3:20
7. "Lift Every Voice and Sing" (John Rosamond Johnson, James Weldon Johnson) – 6:05
8. "Something for Bubba" (Crawford, McGriff) – 7:10 Additional track on CD release

== Personnel ==
- Hank Crawford – alto saxophone
- Jimmy McGriff – organ
- Jimmy Ponder – guitar
- Billy Preston – piano (tracks 1 & 6–8)
- Vance James − drums
