= Chapter Four: Alive in New York =

Live album by Gato Barbieri
- Released: 1975
- Recorded: February 20–23, 1975
- Genre: Jazz
- Length: 43:01
- Label: Impulse!
- Producer: Ed Michel

Gato Barbieri chronology
Yesterdays (1974)	Chapter Four: Alive in New York (1975)	Caliente! (1976)

Chapter Four: Alive in New York is a live album by Argentinian saxophonist and composer Gato Barbieri featuring released on the Impulse! label.

== Reception ==
The Allmusic review by Thom Jurek awarded the album 4 stars stating "Chapter 4: Alive in New York is one of Barbieri's finest moments on record". The Penguin Guide to Jazz Recordings gives the album a “crown” in addition to a maximum four-star rating, calling it “a classic, iconic album of the ‘70s”.

Professional ratings
Review scores
Source	Rating
Allmusic	4/5 stars
Penguin Guide to Jazz	👑
The Rolling Stone Jazz Record Guide	3/5 stars

== Track listing ==
All compositions by Gato Barbieri except as indicated

1. "Milonga Triste" (Homero Manzi, Sebastian Piana) - 6:30
2. "La China Leoncia Part 1" - 3:24
3. "La China Leoncia Part 2" - 4:09
4. "La China Leoncia Part 3" - 3:57
5. "La China Leoncia Pt. 4" - 4:16
6. "Baihia" (Isla de Demendes) - 10:50
7. "Lluvia Azul" - 9:55

Recorded at the Bottom Line in New York City on February 20–23, 1975

== Personnel ==
- Gato Barbieri - tenor saxophone, guiro
- Howard Johnson - tuba, flugelhorn, bass clarinet, tambourine
- Eddie Martinez - electric piano
- Paul Metzke - guitar
- Ron Carter - bass
- Portinho - drums
- Ray Armando - conga, percussion
