= Qué Pasa (album) =

Studio album by Gato Barbieri
- Released: 1997
- Genre: Smooth jazz
- Label: Columbia
- Producer: Philippe Saisse

Gato Barbieri chronology
The Third World Revisited (1988)	Qué Pasa (1997)	Che Corazón (1999)

Qué Pasa is an album by the Argentine musician Gato Barbieri, released in 1997. It was his first studio album in more than a decade. Barbieri supported it with a North American tour. The album was a hit on Billboard's Contemporary Jazz Album chart.

== Production ==
The album was produced by Philippe Saisse. Barbieri and Saisse opted for more of a smooth jazz sound, and also incorporated synthesizers and programmed drums. "The Woman I Remember" is a tribute to Barbieri's late wife. "Blue Gala" is dedicated to the physical therapist who aided Barbieri after his 1995 heart surgery. "Mystica" is an interpretation of Erik Satie's Gymnopédies. Barbieri regretted that the album was around an hour in running time, which he thought was too long.

== Critical reception ==
Professional ratings
Review scores
Source	Rating
AllMusic	2/5 stars
The Encyclopedia of Popular Music	3/5 stars
MusicHound Jazz: The Essential Album Guide	0/5 stars
The Penguin Guide to Jazz on CD	3/4 stars

The Record deemed the album "a softer blend of Latin hip-hop," writing that "it often is overloaded with the unnatural, plasticized sounds brought on by programming and overdubbing." Hispanic noted that "Barbieri's one-of-a-kind muscular tone is sensual and exotic, with a universal appeal that makes his music timeless pop." The Jerusalem Post concluded that, "having traveled, over the course of three decades, from primeval, screaming wildness to soft, minimal whispers, Barbieri now steers an elegant, knowing, and sensuous middle course."

AllMusic wrote that Barbieri "does little other than state the 11 melodies (which range from catchy to completely forgettable), and the backing is quite anonymous, over-produced and obviously geared for potential radio airplay." MusicHound Jazz: The Essential Album Guide gave the album a rare zero-star rating (woof!).

== Track listing ==
No.	Title	Length
1.	"Straight into the Sunrise"
2.	"Blue Gala"
3.	"Mystica"
4.	"Dancing with Dolphins"
5.	"Círculos"
6.	"Guadeloupe"
7.	"Cause We've Ended as Lovers"
8.	"Indonesia"
9.	"The Woman I Remember"
10.	"Granada"
11.	"Adentro"
