= Stand by Me (Whatcha See Is Whatcha Get) =

Stand By Me (Whatcha See Is Whatcha Get)

Studio album by Pretty Purdie and The Playboys
- Released: 1971
- Recorded: August 12 & 13, 1971
- Studio: Atlantic, New York City
- Genre: Soul jazz
- Length: 34:21
- Label: Mega/Flying Dutchman; M51-5001
- Producer: Bob Thiele

Bernard Purdie chronology
Purdie Good! (1971)	Stand By Me (Whatcha See Is Whatcha Get) (1971)	Shaft (1971)

Stand By Me (Whatcha See Is Whatcha Get) is an album led by jazz drummer Bernard Purdie which was recorded for the Mega label in 1971 and released on their Flying Dutchman Series.

== Reception ==
Professional ratings
Review scores
Source	Rating
Allmusic	2.5/5 stars

Victor W. Valdivia of Allmusic writes, "Stand by Me is a frustrating album. Bernard "Pretty" Purdie was always an extraordinarily talented musician, but as a bandleader and songwriter, he was inconsistent at best... Stand by Me has some high points, but is not the place for newcomers to discover Purdie's talents".

== Track listing ==
1. "Stand by Me" (Ben E. King, Jerry Leiber, Mike Stoller) – 4:55
2. "Modern Jive" (Bernard Purdie, Richard Tee) – 3:18
3. "Spanish Harlem" (Mike Leiber, Phil Spector) – 3:29
4. "Artificialness" (Purdie, Gil Scott-Heron) – 3:05
5. "Never Can Say Goodbye" (Clifton Davis) – 3:00
6. "Whatcha See Is Whatcha Get" (Tony Hester) – 5:13
7. "It's Too Late" (Carole King, Toni Stern) – 4:30
8. "Funky Mozart" (Purdie, Harold Wheeler, Mort Goode) – 3:00
9. "You've Got a Friend" (Carole King) – 3:51

== Personnel ==
- Bernard Purdie – drums
- Snooky Young, Gerry Thomas – trumpet
- Billy Mitchell, Donald Ashworth, Lou Delgatto, Seldon Powell, Warren Daniels – reeds
- Harold Wheeler – piano, electric piano, arranger, conductor
- Neal Rosengarden – harpsichord, tambourine
- Billy Nichols, Cornell Dupree – guitar
- Chuck Rainey – electric bass
- Norman Pride – congas, bongos
- Carl Hall, Hilda Harris, Norma Jenkins, Tasha Thomas – vocals

== Production ==
- Bob Thiele – producer
- Gene Paul – engineer
