= The 3B's =

The 3B's (also credited as The Three B's) was a jazz trio comprising pianist Bross Townsend, bassist Bob Cunningham and drummer Bernard Purdie.

They recorded two albums of jazz and blues standards in the mid-1990s, both of which featured, among other sidemen, Houston Person on tenor saxophone and Fred Smith on trumpet.

The three B's (Bross, Bob and Bernard) had previously recorded together in 1985 on Bob Cunningham's only album as leader, Walking Bass. Purdie, Carrie Smith, and Bross Townsend had previously performed together at the Brooklyn Academy of Music's 100 Years of Jazz and Blues festival in 1992.

== Critical reception ==
Allmusic reviewer Steven MacDonald gave After Hours with The 3B's 4 out of 5 stars, saying "It's a delight from start to finish, with all the participants basically out for a good time. As always, it's a delight to hear Purdie play -- and he satisfies drumaholics with plenty of tight, smart solos."

== Discography ==
- 1993: After Hours with The 3B's – additional personnel: Carrie Smith (vocals); Houston Person (tenor saxophone); Fred Smith (trumpet).
- 1994: Soothin' n Groovin' with The 3B's – additional personnel: Eunice Newkirk (vocals); Donny Albano, Bucky Pizzarelli (guitar); Rob Paparozzi (harmonica); Houston Person (saxophone); Fred Smith (trumpet);
