= Soul Is... Pretty Purdie =

Studio album by Pretty Purdie
- Released: 1972
- Recorded: March 10 & June 23, 1972; New York City
- Genre: Jazz-funk, soul jazz
- Length: 32:54
- Label: Flying Dutchman; FD-10154
- Producer: Bernard Purdie & Bob Thiele

Bernard Purdie chronology
| Shaft (1971) | Soul Is... Pretty Purdie (1972) | Delights of the Garden (1977) |

Soul Is... Pretty Purdie is an album led by R&B drummer Bernard Purdie which was recorded for the Flying Dutchman label in 1972.

== Reception ==
Professional ratings
Review scores
| Source | Rating |
|---|---|
| Allmusic | 4.5/5 stars |

The Allmusic site awarded the album 4½ stars.

== Track listing ==
1. "What's Going On/Ain't No Sunshine" (Renaldo Benson, Al Cleveland, Marvin Gaye/Bill Withers) – 3:58
2. "Don't Go" (Bernard "Pretty" Purdie) – 3:15
3. "Good Livin' (Good Lovin')" (Horace Ott) – 3:35
4. "Day Dreaming" (Aretha Franklin) – 5:05
5. "Song for Aretha" (Ott, Purdie, Bob Thiele) – 7:30
6. "Put It Where You Want It" (Joe Sample) – 5:15
7. "Heavy Soul Slinger" (Ott) – 4:16

== Personnel ==
- Bernard Purdie – drums, vocals
- Danny Moore, Ernie Royal – trumpet (tracks 2 & 5)
- Garnett Brown – trombone (tracks 2 & 5)
- Jimmy Powell – alto saxophone (tracks 2 & 5)
- Charlie Brown (tracks 1, 3, 4, 6 & 7), Harold Vick (tracks 2 & 5), Seldon Powell (tracks 2 & 5) – tenor saxophone
- Arthur Clarke – baritone saxophone (tracks 2 & 5)
- Cornell Dupree (tracks 2 & 5), Jay Berliner (tracks 2 & 5), Billy Nichols (tracks 1, 3, 4, 6 & 7), Lloyd Davis (tracks 1, 3, 4, 6 & 7) – guitar
- Horace Ott – electric piano, piano, arranger, conductor
- Paul Griffin (tracks 1, 4 & 6), Richard Tee (Tracks 2 & 5) – organ
- Jerry Jemmott (tracks 2 & 5), Paul Martinez – electric bass (tracks 1, 3, 4, 6 & 7)
- Norman Pride – congas, bongos
- Gayle Dixon, Julien Barber, Noel DaCosta, Sanford Allen – violin (tracks 2 & 5)
- Alfred Brown, Selwart Clarke – viola (tracks 2 & 5)
- Kermit Moore, Ronald Lipscomb – cello (tracks 2 & 5)
- Ralph MacDonald – bongos (track 2 & 5)
- Gordon Powell – percussion (tracks 2 & 5)
- Barbara Massey, Carl Hall, Eileen Gilbert, Hilda Harris, Maeretha Stewart – backing vocals (track 5)

=== Production ===
- Bob Thiele – producer
- Bob Simpson and Tony May – engineer

== Sample use ==
- "Good Livin' (Good Lovin')" has been sampled in "3 Kilos" by The Prodigy, from their album Music for the Jilted Generation (1994).
- "Song for Aretha" has been sampled by Beck in the song "Hotwax" from his 1996 album Odelay.
- "Heavy Soul Slinger" has been sampled in "Poison" by The Prodigy, from their album Music for the Jilted Generation (1994), and by Massive Attack in the song Mezzanine from the eponymous 1998 album.
