= The Starting Five =

Studio album by Jimmy McGriff
- Released: 1987
- Recorded: October 14 and 15, 1986
- Studio: Van Gelder Studio, Englewood Cliffs, NJ
- Genre: Jazz
- Length: 40:26
- Label: Milestone; M-9148
- Producer: Bob Porter

Jimmy McGriff chronology
| Soul Survivors (1986) | The Starting Five (1987) | Steppin' Up (1987) |

The Starting Five is an album by organist Jimmy McGriff recorded in 1986 and released on the Milestone label the following year.

== Reception ==
Professional ratings
Review scores
| Source | Rating |
|---|---|
| Allmusic | 4.5/5 stars |
| The Penguin Guide to Jazz Recordings | 3/4 stars |

Allmusic's Scott Yanow said: "Due to the strong lineup and the basic but perfectly suitable material, this Jimmy McGriff CD is well worth picking up. ... A fun and swinging session".

== Track listing ==
All compositions by Jimmy McGriff except where noted

1. "Movin' On" (David Newman) – 7:15
2. "Doggone" – 4:28
3. "I'm Getting Sentimental Over You" (George Bassman, Ned Washington) – 7:26
4. "BGO" – 5:48
5. "You Belong to Me" (Chilton Price, Pee Wee King, Redd Stewart) – 4:53
6. "Granny's Lane" – 5:41
7. "Georgia on My Mind" (Hoagy Carmichael, Stuart Gorrell) – 5:27
8. "Hittin' the Jug" (Gene Ammons) – 10:37 Additional track on CD release

== Personnel ==
- Jimmy McGriff – organ
- Rusty Bryant – alto saxophone, tenor saxophone
- David "Fathead" Newman – alto saxophone, tenor saxophone, flute
- Mel Brown, Wayne Boyd (tracks 1–3 & 6) – guitar
- Bernard Purdie − drums
