= Soul Drums =

Studio album by Pretty Purdie
- Released: 1967
- Recorded: 1967; New York City
- Genre: Jazz, funk
- Length: 55:14
- Label: Date; TEM-3006/TES-4006
- Producer: David Kapralik and Ken Williams

Pretty Purdie chronology
Soul Drums (1967)	Purdie Good! (1971)

Soul Drums is the debut album by drummer Bernard "Pretty" Purdie, recorded for the Date label in 1967. The single "Funky Donkey" reached No. 87 on the Billboard Hot 100 in 1967.

== Reception ==
Professional ratings
Review scores
Source	Rating
AllMusic	4.5/5 stars

The review by Jason Ankeny of AllMusic states:

Not so much an album as it is a master class in the art of funk percussion, Soul Drums is the quintessential Bernard "Pretty" Purdie LP, an unstoppable rhythm machine made all the more memorable by its fiercely idiosyncratic production... Purdie creates a suite of deep funk grooves notable for the sheer insistence of their energy as well as the remarkable imagination and skill of their beats, all topped off with echo-chamber-like production that underscores the music's visceral punch. It is virtually impossible to listen to Soul Drums without nodding your head and tapping your foot–– and physical response, not thoughts or words, are its most sincere praise.

== Track listing ==
All compositions by Bernard Purdie except where indicated

1. "Soul Drums" – 3:33
2. "Bee 'N' Tee" (Purdie, Richard Tee) – 2:56
3. "Caravan" (Duke Ellington, Irving Mills, Juan Tizol) – 2:41
4. "Soul Bossa Nova" (Purdie, Tee) – 2:46
5. "Jimmy's Back" (Purdie, James Tyrell) – 2:37
6. "Funky Donkey" – 3:01
7. "Bill's Groove" – 2:44
8. "On the Outskirts of Minitown" – 3:19
9. "Testifyin'" (Purdie, Tee) – 2:37
10. "Modern Jive" (Purdie, Tee) – 2:46
11. "Blow Your Lid (But Watch Your Cool)" – 2:40
12. "Alexander's Ragtime Band" (Irving Berlin) – 4:03 Bonus track on CD reissue
13. "Fickle Finger of Fate" (Billy Jackson, Richard Rome, James Wisner) – 1:53 Bonus track on CD reissue
14. "Genuine John" (Cornell Dupree, Chuck Rainey) – 2:44 Bonus track on CD reissue
15. "Soul Clappin'" (Purdie, Tee) – 2:40 Bonus track on CD reissue
16. "Groovin'" (Eddie Brigati, Felix Cavaliere) – 3:38 Bonus track on CD reissue
17. "If You Never Cried" (Jerome Jackson) – 3:08 Bonus track on CD reissue
18. "Stop" (Jerry Ragovoy, Mort Shuman) – 2:48 Bonus track on CD reissue
19. "Time Is Tight" (Booker T. Jones, Al Jackson Jr., Donald "Duck" Dunn, Steve Cropper) – 2:40 Bonus track on CD reissue

== Personnel ==
- Bernard "Pretty" Purdie – drums, shouting vocals
- Seldon Powell – tenor saxophone, flute
- Buddy Lucas – tenor saxophone, flute, baritone saxophone, shouting vocals
- Billy Butler – guitar
- Eric Gale – guitar
- Richard Tee – piano, Hammond organ, arranger
- Bob Bushnell – bass
