= Soul Survivors (Hank Crawford and Jimmy McGriff album) =

Studio album by Hank Crawford and Jimmy McGriff
- Released: 1986
- Recorded: January 29 and 30, 1986
- Studio: Van Gelder Studio, Englewood Cliffs, NJ
- Genre: Jazz
- Length: 42:05
- Label: Milestone; M-9142/MCD-9142-2
- Producer: Bob Porter

Hank Crawford chronology
Roadhouse Symphony (1985)	Soul Survivors (1986)	Mr. Chips (1986)

Jimmy McGriff chronology
State of the Art (1985)	Soul Survivors (1986)	The Starting Five (1986)

Soul Survivors is an album by saxophonist Hank Crawford and organist Jimmy McGriff recorded in 1986 and released on the Milestone label.

== Reception ==
Professional ratings
Review scores
Source	Rating
Allmusic	4/5 stars
The Penguin Guide to Jazz Recordings	2.5/4 stars

Allmusic's Scott Yanow said: "The superior material and the infectious swing supplied by McGriff and his rhythm mates inspire Hank Crawford to some of his best playing of the era. Recommended".

== Track listing ==
1. "Because of You" (Arthur Hammerstein, Dudley Wilkinson) – 6:02
2. "The Frim-Fram Sauce" (Joe Ricardel, Redd Evans) – 8:33
3. "The Peeper" (Hank Crawford) – 4:44
4. "One Mint Julep" (Rudy Toombs) – 6:44
5. "The Second Time Around" (Jimmy Van Heusen, Sammy Cahn) – 6:59
6. "After Supper" (Neal Hefti) – 9:03

== Personnel ==
- Hank Crawford – alto saxophone
- Jimmy McGriff – organ, synthesizer
- George Benson (tracks 1–3) – guitar
- Jim Pittsburgh [AKA Jimmy Ponder] (tracks 4–6) – guitar
- Bernard Purdie (tracks 1 & 3–6), Mel Lewis (track 2) − drums
