= Bross Townsend =

American jazz musician

Bross Elvie Townsend Jr. (October 18, 1933 – May 12, 2003) was an American jazz and blues pianist.

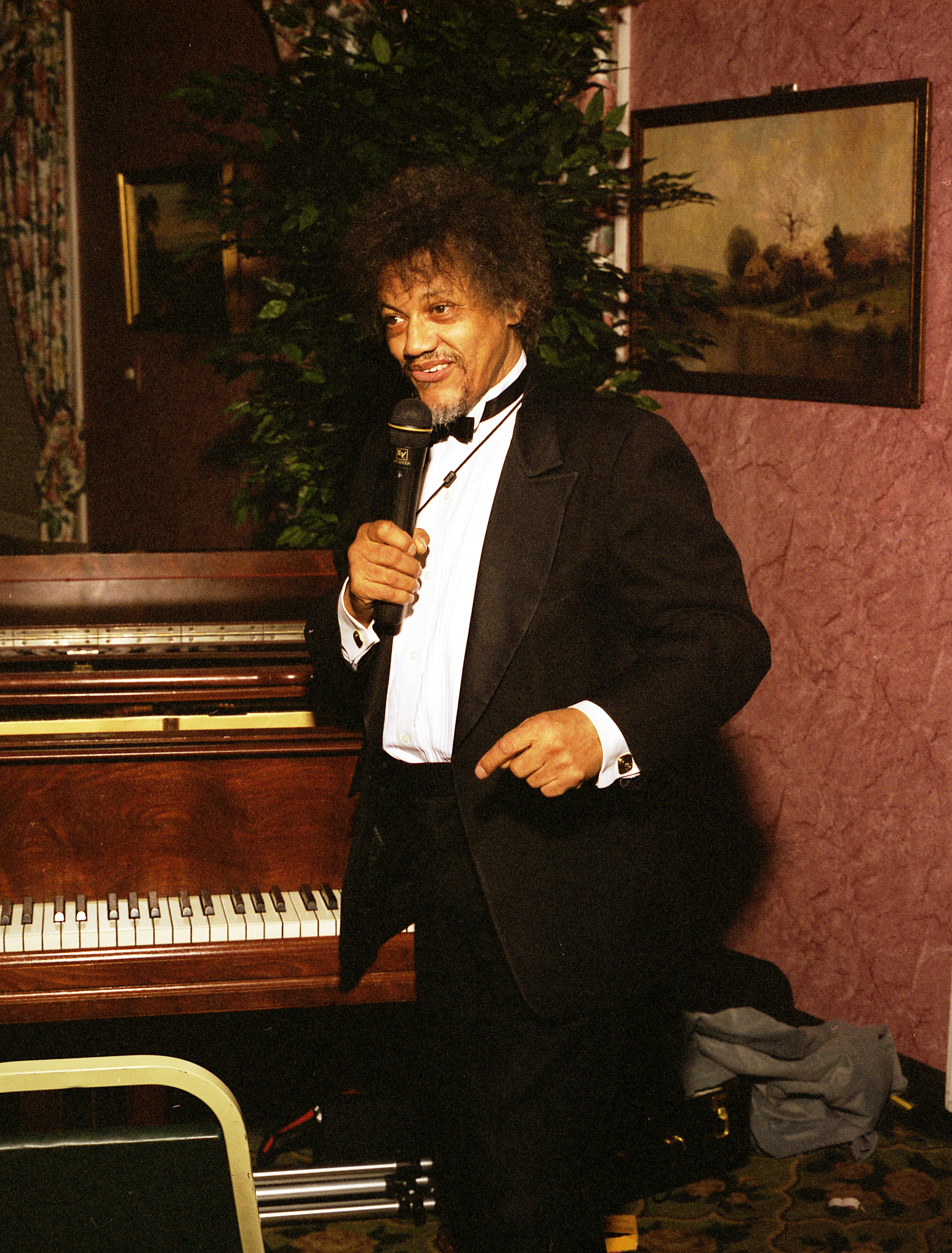

Townsend was born in Princeton, Kentucky. His father was also a pianist, and started his son on the instrument at age seven. Townsend moved to Cleveland in 1951 and attended the Cleveland Institute of Music. He accompanied local singers such as Little Jimmy Scott and Wynonie Harris and played freelance from 1953 with Gene Ammons, John Coltrane, Memphis Slim, and Jimmy Reed. He made several tours of Europe.

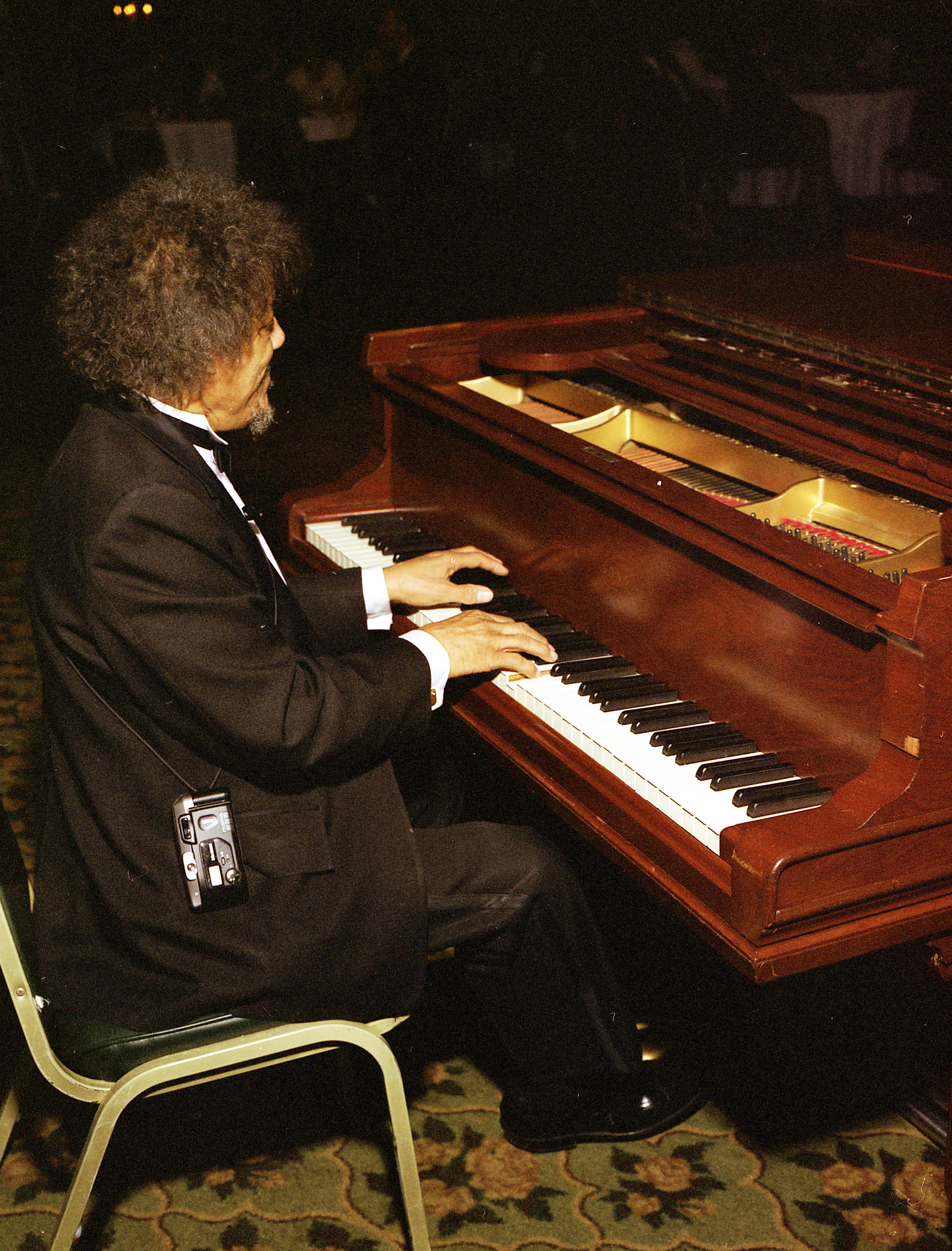

Townsend was active in New York City from 1959 almost up until his death there in 2003; he worked with Warren Smith (in the Composer's Workshop Ensemble), Carrie Smith, Bubba Brooks, Woody Herman, Diana Ross, Kalaparusha Maurice McIntyre, Arvell Shaw, in addition to performing solo. He was also a member of The 3B's, with Bob Cunningham and Bernard Purdie. Townsend went blind in the middle of the 1990s but continued to perform. He often backed vocalist Carrie Smith.

== Discography ==
As leader/co-leader

- What a Body – Bross Townsend and his trio – GP label GBTB 5030
- 1995: I Love Jump Jazz (Claves Jazz)
- 1998: I Got Music on My Mind (BNH)

With The 3B's

- 1993: After Hours with The 3B's
- 1994: Soothin' n Groovin' with the 3B's – additional personnel: Eunice Newkirk (vocals); Donny Albano, Bucky Pizzarelli (guitar); Rob Paparozzi (harmonica); Houston Person (tenor saxophone); Fred Smith (trumpet).
