= Yesterdays (Gato Barbieri album) =

Studio album by Gato Barbieri
- Released: 1974
- Recorded: 1974; New York City
- Genre: Jazz
- Length: 37:14
- Label: Flying Dutchman BDL 1-0550
- Producer: Bob Thiele

Gato Barbieri chronology
Chapter Three: Viva Emiliano Zapata (1974)	Yesterdays (1974)	Chapter Four: Alive in New York (1975)

Yesterdays is an album by Argentinian jazz composer and saxophonist Gato Barbieri featuring performances recorded in New York in 1974 and first released on the Flying Dutchman label. The album was rereleased in 1988 as The Third World Revisited with two additional tracks from El Pampero.

== Reception ==
Professional ratings
Review scores
Source	Rating
AllMusic	4/5 stars

AllMusic awarded the album 4 stars stating "Tenor-saxophonist Gato Barbieri is in particularly fine form on this release, stretching out on four selections... Barbieri is often exuberant on this spirited and emotional set".

== Track listing ==
1. "Yesterdays" (Jerome Kern, Otto Harbach) - 10:43
2. "A John Coltrane Blues" (John Coltrane) - 8:30
3. "Marnie" (Bernard Herrmann, Gloria Shayne) - 7:09
4. "Cariňoso" (Pixinguinha) - 10:52

== Personnel ==
- Gato Barbieri - tenor saxophone
- Jorge Dalto - piano, electric piano
- Paul Metzke - electric guitar
- Ron Carter - electric bass
- Bernard Purdie - drums
- Ray Mantilla - timbales
- Babafemi - congas
