= Beauty and the Beat! =

Studio album by Peggy Lee and George Shearing
- Released: May 28, 1959
- Recorded: April 29, 1959
- Genre: Jazz
- Length: 38:48
- Label: Capitol ST 1219
- Producer: Dave Cavanaugh

Peggy Lee and George Shearing chronology
I Like Men! (1959)	Beauty and the Beat! (1959)	Latin ala Lee! (1959)

Professional ratings
Review scores
Source	Rating
AllMusic	4/5 stars

Beauty and the Beat! is a 1959 album by Peggy Lee, accompanied by the George Shearing Quintet.

== Sleeve notes ==
The notes on the back cover of the original 1959 LP are in the exaggerated style that was common at the time and present the story that the recording was live:

Beauty and the Beat!

Peggy Lee and George Shearing perform together for the first time in the spectacular concert recorded during the Disc Jockey Convention in Miami, Florida.

Miami, May 29, 1959 - More than 2500 of the Nation's top disc jockeys were on hand to cheer performances by Peggy Lee and George Shearing during the Friday night concert at the American Hotel. The occasion was the DJ's second annual convention, held in Miami this year. And the concert, staged in the hotel's huge ballroom as combined entertainment and recording session, treated the audience to the opportunity of hearing these two famous "names" in a first-time appearance together.

Even after the intense pressure of frantic all-day rehearsals, the artists turned up for the session completely relaxed and in a mood to swing. Miss Lee, in a shimmering gown, was as beautiful to see as she was to hear. And she, George shearing, and the other musicians, swung handsomely through tune after tune with a spontaneous beat that was felt by everyone in the vast room.

A troublesome P.A. system caused the audience some difficulty in hearing parts of the session, but their warm applause gives a good indication of the response with which the professional DJs greeted the performances. And fortunately, great sounds were being fed continuously to Capitol's engineers manning the recording equipment back stage, so that the recorded results escaped unscathed.

The Quintet played with spirit and taste in support of the famous Shearing piano lead - both in instrumental numbers and in the inventive vocal backings. And Peggy Lee sang as though she didn't have a care in the world other than her interpretations, which included quite a variety of ballad and uptempo stylings. For example, her treatment of I Lost My Sugar In Salt Lake City was sultry and insinuating. Ellington's beautiful All Too Soon emerged lush and dreamy, and she breezed delightfully through an "up" version of If Dreams Come True.

The instrumentals by George Shearing and the Quintet included an original penned for the occasion by conga drummer Armando Peraza, and entitled Mambo in Miami. Satin Doll and Isn't it Romantic? showed off the free-swinging precision of the group.

Peggy Lee and George Shearing's announcements and comments between tunes helped to carry an informal, relaxed mood across to audience, which made the evening thoroughly enjoyable for all concerned.

Stereo note:

Excellent stereo recording takes the listener to a reserved table in Miami on concert night. On stage, Peggy Lee is performing up towards the footlights and at center. George Shearing is over towards the right, along with vibes and guitar. And, at the listener's left are bass, drums and conga drums. Stereo vividly spotlights the placement of each artist, and gives crisp, at-the session clarity to their blended sound.

== Track listing ==
=== 1959 version ===
1. "Do I Love You?" (Cole Porter) – 3:03
2. "I Lost My Sugar in Salt Lake City" (Johnny Lange, Leon Rene) – 2:27
3. "If Dreams Come True" (Benny Goodman, Irving Mills, Edgar Sampson) – 2:20
4. "All Too Soon" (Duke Ellington, Carl Sigman) – 2:35
5. "Mambo in Miami" (Armando Peraza) – 1:42
6. "Isn't It Romantic?" (Richard Rodgers, Lorenz Hart) – 2:54
7. "Blue Prelude" (Joe Bishop, Gordon Jenkins) – 2:06
8. "You Came a Long Way from St. Louis" (John Benson Brooks, Bob Russell) – 2:50
9. "Always True to You in My Fashion" (Porter) – 1:58
10. "There'll Be Another Spring" (Peggy Lee, Hubie Wheeler) – 2:23
11. "Get Out of Town" (Porter) – 1:58
12. "Satin Doll" (Ellington, Johnny Mercer, Billy Strayhorn) – 2:47

== Personnel ==
- George Shearing – piano
- Peggy Lee – vocals
- Ray Alexander – vibraphone
- Toots Thielemans – guitar
- Jimmy Bond – double bass
- Roy Haynes – drums
- Armando Peraza – conga

== Remaster ==
This recording was re-issued in 2003 as a CD on the Capitol Jazz label and was described as 'Newly restored from the original studio session tapes'. It was a remixed and remastered version of the original 3-track tapes. The remaster also contained two additional tracks from the studio session, but not included on the original vinyl release - 'Nobody's Heart' (Rodgers and Hart) as track 13 and 'Don't Ever Leave Me' (Oscar Hammerstein II, Jerome Kern) as track 14. The description on the CD names different players from those noted above for the 1959 vinyl version. The personnel are given as:

- Peggy Lee - Vocals (tracks 1–4, 7–11, 13, 14)
- George Shearing - Piano
- Ray Alexander - Vibes (tracks 1–12)
- Toots Thielemans - Guitar (tracks 1–12) NB. Name wrongly spelled as Toots Thielmanns on CD cover notes.
- Carl Pruitt - Bass (tracks 1–13)
- Ray Mosca - Drums (tracks 1–13)
- Armando Peraza - Conga, percussion (tracks 5, 9)

Other recording and production information is given on the cover notes as follows:

1. Produced by David Cavanaugh, recorded on May 28–30, 1959
2. Re-issue produced by Cy Godfrey and Michael Cuscuna
3. Remixed from the original 3-track tapes and remastered in 24 bit by Ron McMaster.

There is also a descriptive note, explaining the subterfuge of claiming that the original issue was of a live recording:

This album was originally released with overdubbed applause and background ambience and issued as recorded at the 1959 Miami Disk Jockey's (sic) Convention. It was actually recorded in the studio shortly before or after the actual appearance and is presented here in its pure state and greatly improved fidelity. Tracks 13 and 14, recorded at these sessions, were not included on the original LP.
