= Ray Alexander (musician) =

American jazz drummer and vibraphonist

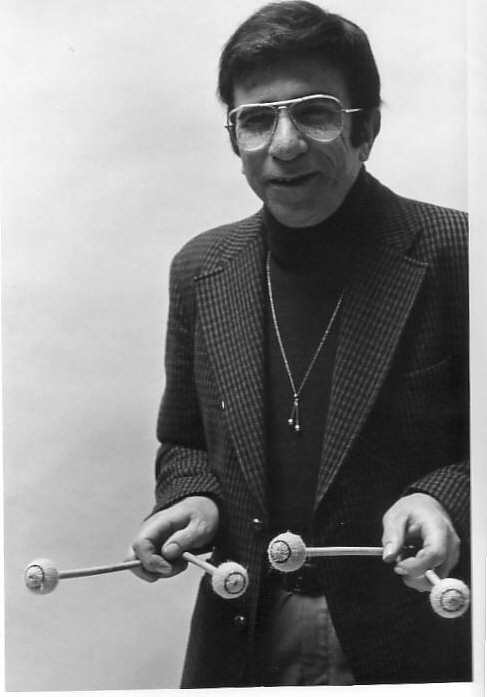
- Alexander in 1982

Background information
- Born: February 7, 1925
- Died: June 8, 2002 (aged 77) New Hyde Park, New York
- Genres: Jazz
- Instruments: Vibraphone, Drums

Ray Alexander (February 7, 1925 – June 8, 2002) was a jazz drummer and vibraphonist. He is best known for his work with George Shearing and Peggy Lee on Beauty And The Beat (1959), Quiet Village (1959), Cloud Patterns (1988), Rain In June (1993), and Vigorous Vibes (1998).

== Biography ==
Ray started his musical career as a drummer, playing with Claude Thornhill, Bobby Byrne, the Dorsey Brothers, Stan Getz, Joe Venuti, Mel Torme, Johnny Smith, Chubby Jackson and many others. He later switched to vibes (the vibraphone) and worked with George Shearing, Charlie Barnet, Bill Evans, Anita O'Day, Mel Lewis, and many other jazz notables. Ray also worked with his own quartet in renowned jazz clubs such as Birdland, the Embers, Basin Street East, etc. In the early '70s he joined with Mousey Alexander to form Alexanders the Great, a quartet which was booked frequently at the new Half Note uptown, as well as many other clubs and concerts. He was favorably reviewed in the New York Times, the Virgin Encyclopedia Of Jazz, and Newsday.

In 1983 Ray put out an album called Cloud Patterns, recorded live at Eddie Condon's. It featured Albert Dailey on piano, Harvie Swartz on bass, Ray Mosca on drums, and Pepper Adams on baritone sax. Before it was released, Albert Dailey and Pepper Adams died, so the album was dedicated to their memory.

In 1993 he released Rain In June featuring Ray on vibraphone, Kenny Barron on piano, Warren Vaché Jr. on cornet, Bob Kindred on tenor sax, the late Oliver Jackson on drums and Harvie Swartz on bass. Along with covers ranging from Dizzy Gillespie's "Dizzy Atmostphere" to Van Heusen's "Swinging On A Star", it also featured three original songs: two instrumentals ("Twinkletoes" and "Angelique", written in honor of his granddaughter) and the title track. That also featured Ray singing, with lyrics written by his son Russell Alexander from The Hitman Blues Band.

In 1998 Ray released a CD for Cat's Paw Records, called Vigorous Vibes. It features Ray on vibraphone, Mac Chrupcala on piano, John Anter on drums, and Marshall Wood on bass. It featured covers of songs such as "Hi Fly", "The Preacher", and "Old Folks". It also featured two originals, an instrumental called "Sweet Bossa" and "Victoria Sez", written in honor of his youngest granddaughter. Ray handled the vocals on "Victoria", with lyrics written by Russell Alexander.

Until his death, he played in various jazz clubs in New York and the East coast, as well as college concerts and jazz festivals. In the summer he toured England and nearby European countries playing vibraphone in jazz venues and festivals, including the Guinness Festival, Birmingham Jazz Festival, Buxton Jazz Festival, and many others.

Ray Alexander died in June, 2002 as a result of complications from elective surgery.
