= Bernard Purdie =

American drummer (born 1939)

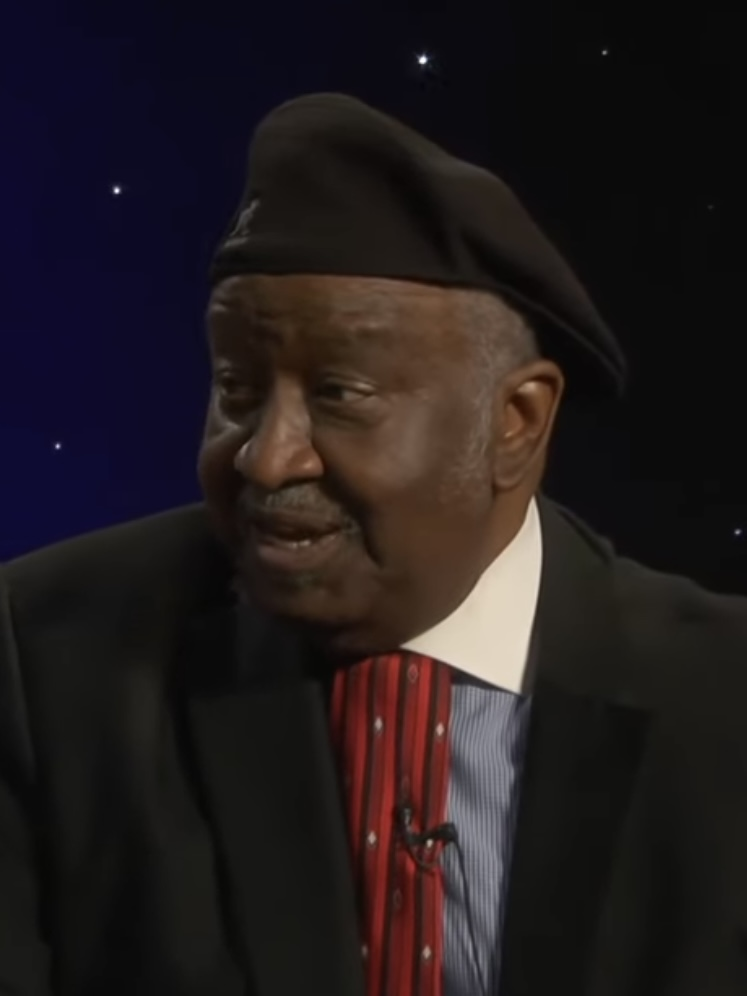
- Purdie in 2020

Background information
- Also known as: Bernard "Pretty" Purdie; Pretty Purdie; Mississippi Bigfoot
- Born: Bernard Lee Purdie; June 11, 1939 (age 87); Elkton, Maryland, U.S.
- Genres: Soul; R&B; funk; soul jazz
- Occupation: Musician
- Instrument: Drums
- Years active: 1958–present
- Labels: A&M; Atco; EMI; Capitol
- Website: bernardpurdiedrums.com

Bernard Lee "Pretty" Purdie (born June 11, 1939) is an American drummer, and an influential R&B, soul, funk and jazz musician. He is known for his precise time-keeping and his signature use of triplets against a half-time backbeat: the Purdie shuffle. He was inducted into the Modern Drummer Hall of Fame in 2013.

One of the most recorded drummers in music history, Purdie is said to have played on over 4,000 recordings.

== Early life ==
Purdie was born on June 11, 1939, in Elkton, Maryland, the 11th of 15 children. At an early age, he began hitting cans with sticks and learned the elements of drumming techniques from overhearing lessons being given by Leonard Heywood. He later took lessons from Heywood and played in Heywood's big band. Purdie's other influences at that time were Papa Jo Jones, Buddy Rich, Gene Krupa, Joe Marshall, Art Blakey, as well as Cozy Cole, Sticks Evans, Panama Francis, Louis Bellson, and Herbie Lovelle.

== Career ==
=== Session work and live performances ===
In 1961, he moved from Elkton to New York City. There he played sessions with Mickey and Sylvia and regularly visited the Turf Club on 50th and Broadway, where musicians, agents, and promoters met and touted for business. It was during this period that he played for the saxophonist Buddy Lucas, who nicknamed him 'Mississippi Bigfoot'. Eventually Barney Richmond contracted him to play session work.

Purdie was contracted by arranger Sammy Lowe to play a session with James Brown in 1965 and recording session records also show that Purdie played on "Ain't That A Groove" at the same session. Purdie is credited on James Brown's albums Say It Loud – I'm Black and I'm Proud (1969) and Get on the Good Foot (1972).

Purdie recorded Soul Drums (1968) as a band leader and although he went on to record Alexander's Ragtime Band, the album remained unreleased until Soul Drums was reissued on CD in 2009 with the Alexander's Ragtime Band sessions. Other solo albums include Purdie Good! (1971), Soul Is... Pretty Purdie (1972) and the soundtrack for the blaxploitation film Lialeh (1973).

Purdie started working with Aretha Franklin as musical director in 1970 and held that position for five years, as well as drumming for Franklin's opening act, saxophonist King Curtis and the King Pins. From March 5 to March 7, 1971, he performed with both bands at the Fillmore West; the resulting live recordings were released as Aretha Live at Fillmore West (1971) and King Curtis's Live at Fillmore West (1971). His best known track with Franklin was "Rock Steady", on which he played what he described as "a funky and low down beat". Of his time with Franklin he once commented that "backing her was like floating in seventh heaven".

Purdie was credited on the soundtrack album for the film Sgt. Pepper's Lonely Hearts Club Band (1978). In the mid-1990s, he was a member of the 3B's, with Bross Townsend and Bob Cunningham. He was the drummer for the 2009 Broadway revival of Hair and appeared on the associated Broadway cast recording. In 2016, he was awarded an honorary doctorate in music by Five Towns College.

On 13 September 2025, Purdie played at Madison Square Garden with Vulfpeck. Introduced by Jack Stratton and helped to the stage by Antwaun Stanley, Purdie then played drums for the song My First Car, showcased the Purdie Shuffle to the crowd, and played drums for a cover of Simply Beautiful.

=== Encounter records ===
Purdie founded Encounter Records in 1973 and released five albums:

- Seldon Powell – Messin' With Seldon Powell (with Jimmy Owens, Garnett Brown)
- Sands of Time – Profile (with Jimmy Owens, Garnett Brown, Seldon Powell)
- East Coast – East Coast (with Larry Blackmon, Gwen Guthrie, Haras Fyre)
- Frank Owens – Brown 'N' Serve (with Hugh McCracken)
- Harold Vick as "Sir Edward" – The Power of Feeling (with Victor Gaskin)

All five studio recordings released under Encounter Records were all released in 1973, which is likely when the label also shut down.

=== Supposed playing on Beatles records ===
Since around 1967, Purdie has claimed to have over-dubbed or completely re-recorded the drums for 21 songs by the Beatles. This claim has been argued since by Purdie and Beatles fans. Ringo Starr denied these claims, stating "Well then, what was I doing in the studio? I've heard that rubbish before. Everyone was expecting me to come out and fight it. You don't bother fighting that shit." Jim Vallance, a Canadian songwriter and producer, bluntly stated that "to claim that he 'fixed' or 'replaced' Ringo's drums on twenty-one Beatle recordings—or that 'Ringo played on nothing'—is a blatant fabrication. Fiction. A lie."

== Personal life ==
In 2023, he moved to New Bern, North Carolina. Purdie has been a resident of New Jersey, living in Edison, Teaneck and Springfield Township.

== Recognition ==
=== Drumming style ===
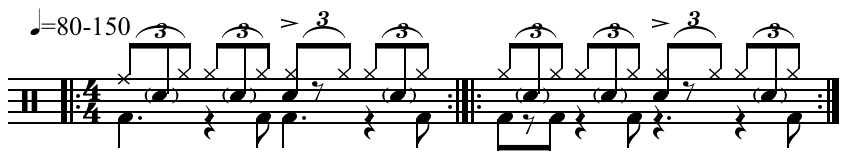
Purdie shuffle variants.

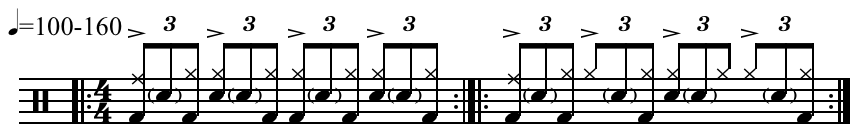
Purdie shuffle variant.

Purdie is known as a groove drummer with immaculate timing who makes use of precision half note, backbeats, and grooves. Purdie's signature sixteenth note hi-hat lick pish-ship, pish-ship, pish-ship is distinct. He often employs a straight eight groove sometimes fusing several influences such as swing, blues and funk. He created the now well-known drum pattern Purdie Half-Time Shuffle that is a blues shuffle variation with the addition of syncopated ghost notes on the snare drum. Variations on this shuffle can be heard on songs such as Led Zeppelin's "Fool in the Rain", the Police's "Walking on the Moon", and Toto's "Rosanna" (Rosanna shuffle). Purdie plays the shuffle on Steely Dan's "Babylon Sisters" and "Home At Last".

=== Achievements ===
On 29 September 2024, Purdie was the recipient of the inaugural "Lifetime Achievement Award" at the UK Drum Show, held in Liverpool.

== Discography ==
=== As leader/co-leader ===
- Soul Drums (Columbia, 1967)
- Purdie Good! (Prestige, 1971) [note: reissued as Legends of Acid Jazz: Bernard Purdie in 1996]
- Stand by Me (Whatcha See Is Whatcha Get) (Mega Records [in the 'Flying Dutchman Series'], 1972) with the Playboys
- Soul Is... Pretty Purdie (Flying Dutchman, 1972; reissued on BGP/Ace in 2014)
- Shaft (Prestige, 1973) recorded 1971 [note: reissued as Legends of Acid Jazz: Bernard Purdie in 1996]
- Lialeh (Original Movie Soundtrack) (Bryan, 1974)
- Delights of the Garden (Celluloid, 1975) with the Last Poets
- Purdie as a Picture (Kilmarnock, 1993) with Galt MacDermot's New Pulse Jazz Band
- Bernard Purdie's Jazz Groove Sessions in Tokyo (Lexington/West 47th, 1993)
- Coolin' 'N Groovin' (A Night At 'On-Air') (Lexington/West 47th, 1993)
- After Hours with the 3B's (3B's Music, 1993)
- Soothin' 'N Groovin' With the 3B's (3B's Music, 1994) with Houston Person
- The Hudson River Rats (3B's Music, 1995)
- Fatback! The Jazz Funk Masters Featuring Bernard Purdie (Seven Seas, 1995)
- Kick 'N Jazz (Drum Beat Blocks, 1996)
- Soul to Jazz I (Act, 1996) with the WDR Big Band
- Soul to Jazz II (Act, 1997) with the WDR Big Band
- In the Pocket (P-Vine, 1997)
- Get It While You Can (3B's Music, 1999) with the Hudson River Rats
- The Masters of Groove Meet Dr. No (Jazzateria, 2001) with Reuben Wilson, Grant Green Jr., Tarus Mateen
- King of the Beat (3B's Music, 2001)
- Purdie Good Cookin' (3B's Music, 2003) with Purdie's Powerhouse
- The Godfathers of Groove (18th & Vine, 2007) with Reuben Wilson, Grant Green Jr., Jerry Jemmott [note: originally released as The Masters of Groove]
- The Godfathers of Groove 3 (18th & Vine, 2009) with Reuben Wilson, Grant Green Jr., Bill Easley
- Jersey Blue (Running Rogue, 2009) with Gene McCormick, Jack Hoban
- Selling It Like It Is (Cadence Jazz, 2009 [rel. 2013]) with David Haney
- Cool Down (Sugar Road, 2018)

=== As sideman ===
- Herbie Mann – Our Mann Flute (Atlantic, 1966)
- Jack McDuff – A Change Is Gonna Come (Atlantic, 1966)
- Freddie McCoy – Funk Drops (Prestige, 1966)
- Gábor Szabó – Jazz Raga (Impulse!, 1966)
- Benny Golson – Tune In, Turn On (Verve, 1967)
- King Curtis & the Kingpins – Instant Groove (Atco, 1967)
- Tim Rose – Tim Rose (Columbia, 1967)
- Ben E. King – What Is Soul (Atco, 1967)
- Nina Simone – Nina Simone Sings the Blues (RCA Victor, 1967)
- Phil Upchurch – Feeling Blue (Milestone, 1967)
- Nina Simone – Silk & Soul (RCA Victor, 1967)
- Tom Rush – The Circle Game (Elektra, 1968)
- The Soul Finders – Sweet Soul Music (RCA Camden CAS-2170, 1968)
- Wilson Pickett – The Midnight Mover (Atlantic, 1968)
- David "Fathead" Newman – Bigger & Better (Atlantic, 1968)
- Freddie McCoy – Listen Here (Prestige, 1968)
- Barbara Lewis – Workin' on a Groovy Thing (Atlantic, 1968)
- Albert Ayler – New Grass (Impulse!, 1968)
- Shirley Scott – Soul Song (Atlantic, 1968)
- Solomon Burke – King Solomon (Atlantic, 1968)
- Gary McFarland – America the Beautiful: An Account of Its Disappearance (Skye, 1969)
- Jimmy McGriff – Electric Funk (Blue Note, 1969)
- Sonny Phillips – Sure 'Nuff (Prestige, 1969)
- David "Fathead" Newman – The Many Facets of David Newman (Atlantic, 1969)
- James Brown – Say It Loud – I'm Black and I'm Proud (King, 1969)
- John Lee Hooker – Simply the Truth (BluesWay, 1969)
- Randy Brecker – Score (Solid State, 1969)
- Carla Thomas – Memphis Queen (Stax, 1969)
- Bill Danoff – Reincarnation (ABC, 1970)
- Al Kooper – You Never Know Who Your Friends Are (Columbia, 1969)
- Hank Crawford – Mr. Blues Plays Lady Soul (Atlantic, 1969)
- Gary Burton – Good Vibes (Atlantic, 1969)
- Shirley Scott – Shirley Scott & the Soul Saxes (Atlantic, 1969)
- Yusef Lateef – Yusef Lateef's Detroit (Atlantic, 1969)
- Boogaloo Joe Jones – Boogaloo Joe (Prestige, 1969)
- Johnny "Hammond" Smith – Soul Talk (Prestige, 1969)
- Gene Ammons – The Boss Is Back! (Prestige, 1969)
- Gene Ammons – Brother Jug! (Prestige, 1969)
- Rusty Bryant – Night Train Now! (Prestige, 1969)
- Herbie Hancock – Fat Albert Rotunda (Warner Bros., 1969)
- Dizzy Gillespie – Cornucopia (Solid State, 1969)
- Johnny "Hammond" Smith – Black Feeling! (Prestige, 1969)
- Larry Coryell – Coryell (Vanguard, 1969)
- Sonny Phillips – Black on Black! (Prestige, 1970)
- Jimmy McGriff & Junior Parker – The Dudes Doin' Business (Capitol, 1970)
- Johnny "Hammond" Smith – Here It 'Tis (Prestige, 1970)
- Louis Armstrong − Louis Armstrong and His Friends (Flying Dutchman, 1970)
- Boogaloo Joe Jones – Right On Brother (Prestige, 1970)
- Boogaloo Joe Jones – No Way! (Prestige, 1970)
- James Brown – It's a New Day – Let a Man Come In (King, 1970)
- The Insect Trust – Hoboken Saturday Night (Atco, 1970)
- Charles Kynard – Afro-Disiac (Prestige, 1970)
- Percy Mayfield – Weakness Is a Thing Called Man (RCA Victor, 1970)
- Five Stairsteps – O-o-h Child (Buddah, 1970) – disputed
- Charles Kynard – Wa-Tu-Wa-Zui (Beautiful People) (Prestige, 1970)
- Houston Person – Houston Express (Prestige, 1970)
- Eddie Palmieri – Harlem River Drive (Roulette, 1971)
- Hank Crawford – It's a Funky Thing to Do (Cotillion, 1971)
- Boogaloo Joe Jones – What It Is (Prestige, 1971)
- Eddie Harris & Les McCann – Second Movement (Atlantic, 1971)
- David "Fathead" Newman – Captain Buckles (Cotillion, 1971)
- Oliver Nelson – Swiss Suite (Flying Dutchman, 1971)
- King Curtis – Live at Fillmore West (Atlantic, 1971)
- Johnny "Hammond" Smith – Wild Horses Rock Steady (Kudu, 1971)
- Larry Coryell – Fairyland (Flying Dutchman, 1971)
- Eddie "Cleanhead" Vinson – You Can't Make Love Alone (Flying Dutchman, 1971)
- Herbie Mann – Push Push (Atlantic, 1971)
- Dizzy Gillespie – The Real Thing (Perception, 1971)
- Gato Barbieri – El Pampero (Flying Dutchman, 1971)
- Gil Scott-Heron – Pieces of a Man (Flying Dutchman, 1971)
- Aretha Franklin – Amazing Grace (Atlantic, 1972)
- Les McCann – Invitation to Openness (Atlantic, 1972)
- Hank Crawford – Help Me Make It Through the Night (Kudu, 1972)
- Aretha Franklin – Young, Gifted and Black (Atlantic, 1972)
- Hubert Laws – Wild Flower (Atlantic, 1972)
- Leon Thomas – Blues and the Soulful Truth (Flying Dutchman, 1972)
- Gil Scott-Heron – Free Will (Flying Dutchman, 1972)
- Esther Phillips – Alone Again, Naturally (Kudu, 1972)
- Miles Davis – Get Up with It (Columbia, 1972)
- Donal Leace – Donal Leace (Atlantic, 1972)
- Dakota Staton – Madame Foo-Foo (Groove Merchant, 1972)
- Jerry Lynn Williams – Jerry Williams (Spindizzy, 1972)
- Howard Tate – Howard Tate (Atlantic, 1972)
- Teresa Brewer – Singin' A Doo-Dah Song (Flying Dutchman, 1972)
- Ronnie Foster – Sweet Revival (Blue Note, 1972)
- Hank Crawford – We Got a Good Thing Going (Kudu, 1972)
- Roberta Flack & Donny Hathaway – Roberta Flack & Donny Hathaway (Atlantic, 1972)
- Esther Phillips – From a Whisper to a Scream (Kudu, 1972)
- Brook Benton – Story Teller (Cotillion, 1972)
- Jackie Lomax – Three (Warner Bros., 1972)
- Oscar Brown – Movin' On (Atlantic, 1972)
- B. B. King – Guess Who (ABC, 1972)
- Buddy Terry – Lean on Him (Mainstream, 1973)
- David "Fathead" Newman – The Weapon (Atlantic, 1973)
- Gato Barbieri – Bolivia (Flying Dutchman, 1973)
- Leon Thomas – Full Circle (Flying Dutchman, 1973)
- Richard "Groove" Holmes – Night Glider (Groove Merchant, 1973)
- Garland Jeffreys – Garland Jeffreys (Atlantic, 1973)
- Lightnin' Rod – Hustlers Convention (Celluloid, 1973)
- Danny O'Keefe – Breezy Stories (Atlantic, 1973)
- Cat Stevens – Foreigner (A&M, 1973)
- Hall & Oates – Abandoned Luncheonette (Atlantic, 1973)
- Bette Midler – Bette Midler (Atlantic, 1973)
- Teresa Brewer – It Don't Mean A Thing If It Ain't Got That Swing (Flying Dutchman, 1973)
- Margie Joseph – Margie Joseph (Atlantic, 1973)
- Jimmy McGriff & Richard "Groove" Holmes – Giants of the Organ Come Together (Groove Merchant, 1973)
- Richard "Groove" Holmes − New Groove (Groove Merchant, 1974)
- Robert Palmer – Sneakin' Sally Through the Alley (Island, 1974)
- Eric Kaz – Cul-De-Sac (Atlantic, 1974)
- Gato Barbieri – Yesterdays (Flying Dutchman, 1974)
- Aretha Franklin – With Everything I Feel in Me (Atlantic, 1974)
- Richie Havens – Mixed Bag II (Verve, 1974)
- Joe Cocker – I Can Stand a Little Rain (A&M, 1974)
- Rusty Bryant – Until It's Time for You to Go (Prestige, 1974)
- Margie Joseph – Sweet Surrender (Atlantic, 1974)
- Aretha Franklin – Let Me in Your Life (Atlantic, 1974)
- Tim Moore – Tim Moore (Mooncrest, 1974)
- Esther Phillips – Performance (Kudu, 1974)
- Arif Mardin – Journey (Atlantic, 1974)
- Roy Ayers Ubiquity – Change Up the Groove (Polydor, 1974)
- Cornell Dupree – Teasin' (Atlantic, 1975)
- Geoff Muldaur – Is Having a Wonderful Time (Reprise, 1975)
- Todd Rundgren – Initiation (Bearsville, 1975)
- Margie Joseph – Margie (Atlantic, 1975)
- Paul Butterfield – Put It in Your Ear (Bearsville, 1975)
- Joe Cocker – Jamaica Say You Will (A&M, 1975)
- Roy Ayers Ubiquity – A Tear to a Smile (Polydor, 1975)
- Jorge Dalto – Chevere (United Artists, 1976)
- Hummingbird – We Can't Go On Meeting Like This (A&M, 1976)
- Michael Bolton – Michael Bolotin (RCA, 1975)
- Steely Dan – The Royal Scam (ABC, 1976)
- Letta Mbulu – There's Music in the Air (A&M, 1976)
- The Tymes – Tymes Up (RCA Victor, 1976)
- Essra Mohawk – Essra (Private Stock, 1976)
- Steely Dan – Aja (ABC, 1977)
- Hummingbird – Diamond Nights (A&M, 1977)
- Alfred "Pee Wee" Ellis – Home in the Country (Savoy, 1977)
- Joe Cocker – Luxury You Can Afford (Elektra, 1978)
- Kate & Anna McGarrigle – Pronto Monto (Warner Bros., 1978)
- Cheryl Lynn – Cheryl Lynn (Columbia, 1978)
- Felix Pappalardi – Don't Worry, Ma (A&M, 1979)
- Cheryl Lynn – In Love (Columbia, 1979)
- Far Cry – The More Things Change... (Columbia, 1980)
- Dizzy Gillespie – Digital at Montreux, 1980 (Pablo, 1980)
- Steely Dan – Gaucho (MCA, 1980)
- Al Johnson – Back for More (Columbia, 1980)
- Aretha Franklin – Aretha (Arista, 1980)
- B. B. King – There Must Be a Better World Somewhere (MCA, 1981)
- Houston Person – Heavy Juice (Muse, 1982)
- Houston Person – Always on My Mind (Muse, 1985)
- Bob Cunningham – Walking Bass (Nilva [Fr], 1985)
- Hank Crawford & Jimmy McGriff – Soul Survivors (Milestone, 1986)
- Hank Crawford – Mr. Chips (Milestone, 1986)
- Jimmy McGriff – The Starting Five (Milestone, 1987)
- Flip Phillips & Scott Hamilton – A Sound Investment (Concord, 1987)
- Jimmy McGriff – Blue to the 'Bone (Milestone, 1988)
- Hank Crawford – Night Beat (Milestone, 1989)
- Jimmy McGriff – You Ought to Think About Me (Headfirst, 1990)
- Hank Crawford – Groove Master (Milestone, 1990)
- Garland Jeffreys – Don't Call Me Buckwheat (BMG, 1991)
- Cissy Houston & Chuck Jackson – I'll Take Care of You (Shanachie, 1992)
- Al Green – Don't Look Back (BMG, 1993)
- Carrie Smith – June Night (Black & Blue, 1993)
- Laura Nyro – Walk the Dog and Light the Light (Columbia, 1993)
- Pucho & His Latin Soul Brothers – Jungle Strut (Lexington/West 47th, 1993; reissued as Pucho's Descarga on ¡Andale! in 2014)
- Carrie Smith – Every Now and Then (Silver Shadow, 1994)
- Jimmy Smith – Damn! (Verve, 1995)
- Al Green – Your Heart's in Good Hands (MCA, 1995)
- Raw Stylus – Pushing Against the Flow (Geffen, 1995)
- Houston Person – The Opening Round (Savant, 1997)
- Hank Crawford & Jimmy McGriff – Road Tested (Milestone, 1997)
- Jimmy McGriff – The Dream Team (Milestone, 1997)
- Hank Crawford – After Dark (Milestone, 1998)
- Jimmy McGriff – Straight Up (Milestone, 1998)
- Hank Crawford & Jimmy McGriff – Crunch Time (Milestone, 1999)
- Leslie West – As Phat as it Gets (Mystic, 1999)
- Jimmy McGriff – McGriff's House Party (Milestone, 2000)
- The Hitman Blues Band – Blooztown (Nerus, 2000]
- Reuben Wilson – Organ Blues (Jazzateria, 2001)
- Oliver Darley – Introducing Oliver Darley (East West, 2001)
- Jimmy McGriff – McGriff Avenue (Milestone, 2002)
- Liv Warfield – Embrace Me (A&M, 2006)
- Elliott Randall – Still Reelin' [EP] (Private Collection Records, 2007)
- Larry Coryell – Earthquake at the Avalon, (Inakustik, 2009)
- Hair – Broadway Cast Recording (Ghostlight/Razor & Tie, 2009)
- Chihiro Yamanaka – Reminiscence (Verve, 2011)
- Mick Taylor – 'East Coast Tour Appearances' (2012)
- Vulfpeck – 'Various Tour Appearances' (2016)
- Eddie Palmieri – Sabiduria (Wisdom) (Ropeadope, 2017)
- George Freeman–Mike Allemana Organ Quartet with special guest: Bernard Purdie – Live at the Green Mill (Ears & Eyes, 2017)
- Gonzalo Aloras – Nuestra Canción (2020)
- Vulfpeck – The Joy of Music, the Job of Real Estate (Vulf, 2020)
- Vulfpeck – MSG II (2025)

== Bibliography ==
- Everett, Walter. The Beatles as musicians: the Quarry Men through Rubber Soul. Oxford University Press US (2001). ISBN 978-0-19-514105-4
- Gottfridsson, Hans Olof; Sheridan, Tony and Beatles. The Beatles from Cavern to Star-Club: The Illustrated Chronicle, Discography & Price Guide 1957–1962. Premium Publishing (1997). ISBN 978-91-971894-7-7
- Kernfeld, Barry Dean. The New Grove Dictionary of Jazz second edition. Grove's Dictionaries Inc. (2002). Digitized 21 Dec (2006). ISBN 978-1-56159-284-5
- Miles, Barry, and Badman, Keith. The Beatles Diary: The Beatles years. Omnibus Press (2001) ISBN 978-0-7119-8308-3
- Payne, Jim and Weinger, Harry. The Great Drummers of R&B Funk & Soul. Mel Bay Publications (2007). ISBN 978-0-7866-7303-2
- Rabb, Johnny; Brych, Ray and Lohman, Gregg. Jungle/Drum 'n' Bass for the Acoustic Drum Set: A Guide to Applying Today's Electronic Music to the Drum Set. Alfred Publishing (2001). ISBN 0-7579-9025-8
- Weinberg, Max. The Big Beat: Conversations with Rock's Greatest Drummers. Hal Leonard Corporation (2004). ISBN 978-0-634-08275-7
- York, William. Who's Who in Rock Music+. Atomic Press (1978). Digitized 30 Aug 2007.
