= Shaft (Bernard Purdie album) =

Studio album by Bernard Purdie
- Released: 1973
- Recorded: October 11, 1971
- Studios: Van Gelder, Englewood Cliffs
- Genres: Soul jazz, jazz-funk
- Length: 31:13
- Labels: Prestige/Fantasy; PR 10038
- Producer: Bob Porter

Bernard Purdie chronology
Stand By Me (Whatcha See Is Whatcha Get) (1971)	Shaft (1973)	Soul Is... Pretty Purdie (1972)

Shaft is an album led by jazz drummer Bernard Purdie, which was recorded for the Prestige label in 1971.

== Reception ==
Professional ratings
Review scores
Source	Rating
Allmusic	2.5/5 stars
The Rolling Stone Jazz Record Guide	2/5 stars

Stewart Mason of Allmusic states, "these limp retreads, apparently aimed at a middle-of-the-road audience that was reaching for hipness but didn't want to be confronted with anything too out there, are utterly unnecessary. There are a handful of good tunes here; although it's unclear what the genial funk groove "Attica" has to do with the 1971 prison riot of the same name, it's got some hot tenor sax solos and a rollicking electric piano solo by composer Neal Creque. Similarly, the mellow and soulful "Summer Melody" has some exquisite electric piano and trumpet over its gentle conga-led groove. An album' s worth of variations on these two themes would have been a minor soul-jazz classic, but unfortunately, Bernard Purdie's overreaching ends up giving him the, um, Shaft".

== Track listing ==
1. "Shaft" (Isaac Hayes) - 5:52
2. "Way Back Home" (Wilton Felder) - 5:30
3. "Attica" (Neal Creque) - 4:12
4. "Changes" (Buddy Miles) - 4:52
5. "Summer Melody" (Harold Ousley) - 6:35
6. "Butterfingers" (Willie Bridges) - 4:12

== Personnel ==
- Bernard Purdie - drums
- Danny Moore, Gerry Thomas - trumpet
- Willie Bridges, Charlie Brown, Houston Person - tenor saxophone
- Neal Creque - electric piano
- Billy Nichols, Lloyd Davis - guitar
- Gordon Edwards - electric bass
- Norman Pride - congas

=== Production ===
- Bob Porter - producer
- Rudy Van Gelder - engineer

== Sample use ==
- "Changes" has been sampled in "Block Rockin' Beats" by The Chemical Brothers, from its 1997 album Dig Your Own Hole, and in "Chiron" by Four Tet, from his first album Dialogue (1999).
