= Night Beat (Hank Crawford album) =

Studio album by Hank Crawford
- Released: 1989
- Recorded: September and October, 1988
- Studio: Van Gelder Studio, Englewood Cliffs, NJ
- Genre: Jazz
- Length: 40:23
- Label: Milestone; M-9168/MCD-9168-2
- Producer: Bob Porter

Hank Crawford chronology
Steppin' Up (1987)	Night Beat (1989)	On the Blue Side (1990)

Night Beat is an album by saxophonist Hank Crawford, recorded in 1988 and released on the Milestone label the following year.

== Reception ==
Professional ratings
Review scores
Source	Rating
AllMusic	3/5 stars
The Penguin Guide to Jazz Recordings	3/4 stars

AllMusic's Scott Yanow called the album an "accessible and enjoyable soul-jazz outing".

== Track listing ==
All compositions by Hank Crawford except where noted

1. "For the Love of You" (The Isley Brothers) – 8:07
2. "Mobile Bay" (Mac Rebennack) – 5:01
3. "Midnight Fantasy" – 6:55
4. "K.C. Blues" (Charlie Parker) – 5:30
5. "What a Wonderful World" (George Douglas, George David Weiss) – 5:30
6. "Sleepin' on the Sidewalk" – 4:57
7. "Trouble in Mind" (Richard M. Jones) – 4:19

== Personnel ==
- Hank Crawford – alto saxophone, electric piano, arranger
- Alan Rubin, Lew Soloff – trumpet
- David "Fathead" Newman – tenor saxophone, flute
- Howard Johnson – baritone saxophone
- Dr. John – piano, organ
- Melvin Sparks – guitar
- Wilbur Bascomb - bass
- Bernard Purdie − drums, percussion
