= Erkencho =

Folk clarinet of northern Gran Chaco, South America

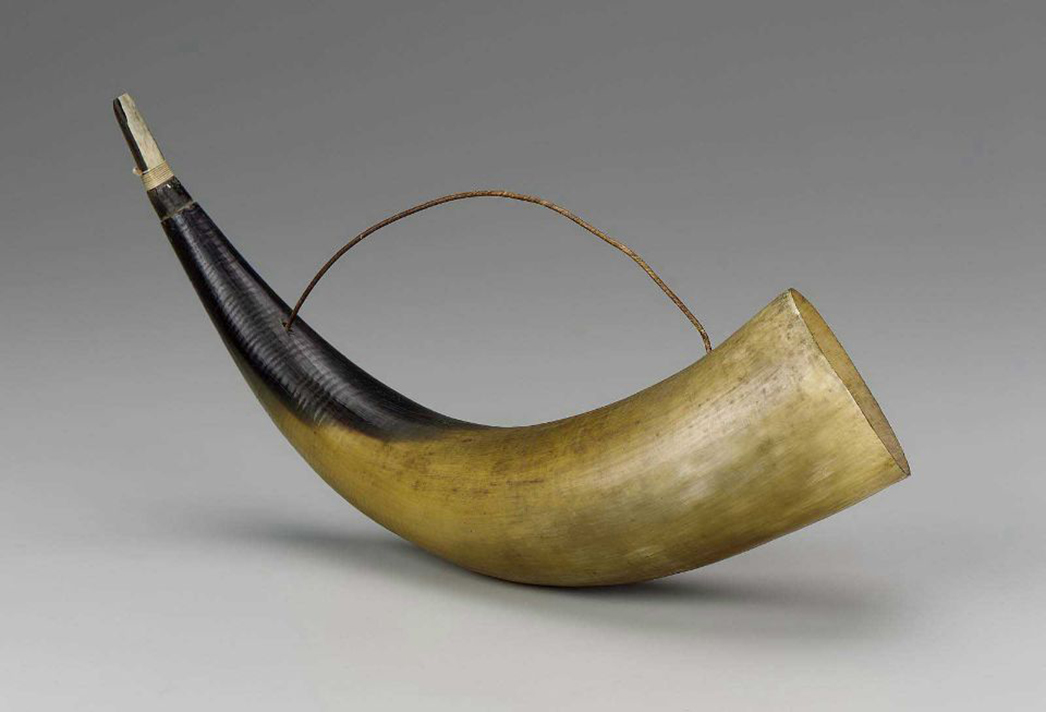
Erkencho

The erkencho is a folk clarinet of the northern region of the Gran Chaco of South America, particularly northwestern Argentina. It consists of a tube 10–13 inches (25–33 cm) long, with a single reed and a cow or goat horn attached at the end, as a hornpipe. Some writers consider the erkencho to be a smaller variant of the erke, with the name erkencho being a diminutive thereof.

== History ==
The erkencho can be traced back in 20th century when Andean folkloric musicians used it to harmonize their music. Although the erkencho is played within secular music, the erke has been most notable as a ritualistic instrument. In fact, certain communities in the Gran Chaco consider playing erke for secular reasons as taboo.

- In ancient days, the erke was played in the winter season, which was characterized by snow, leaving them to believe the erke was responsible for snowy weather. In the spring and summer seasons, people avoiding playing the erke in the fear that it would snow, ultimately affecting them negatively given the fact that farming was the main source of income at the time.

== Construction and design ==
The materials for making this instrument were readily available in Gran Chaco thanks to the floral characteristics of the region. The high temperatures of the region with a rich ecosystem including forests, savannah, cactus and wetlands. It is in these ecosystems that they get the canes or reeds from the wetlands to make the erke instrument. Additionally, with the strong presence of cattle from farming, as well as the presence of other wild animals with horns in nearby forests, the natives would get ready supply of horns to construct their aerophones.

The erkencho is fairly simple in design, constructed out of:

- A long cane or reed
- Wool
- A Horn
- Thread or glue

== See also ==
- Shofar
