= Gato Barbieri =

Argentine jazz saxophonist (1932–2016)

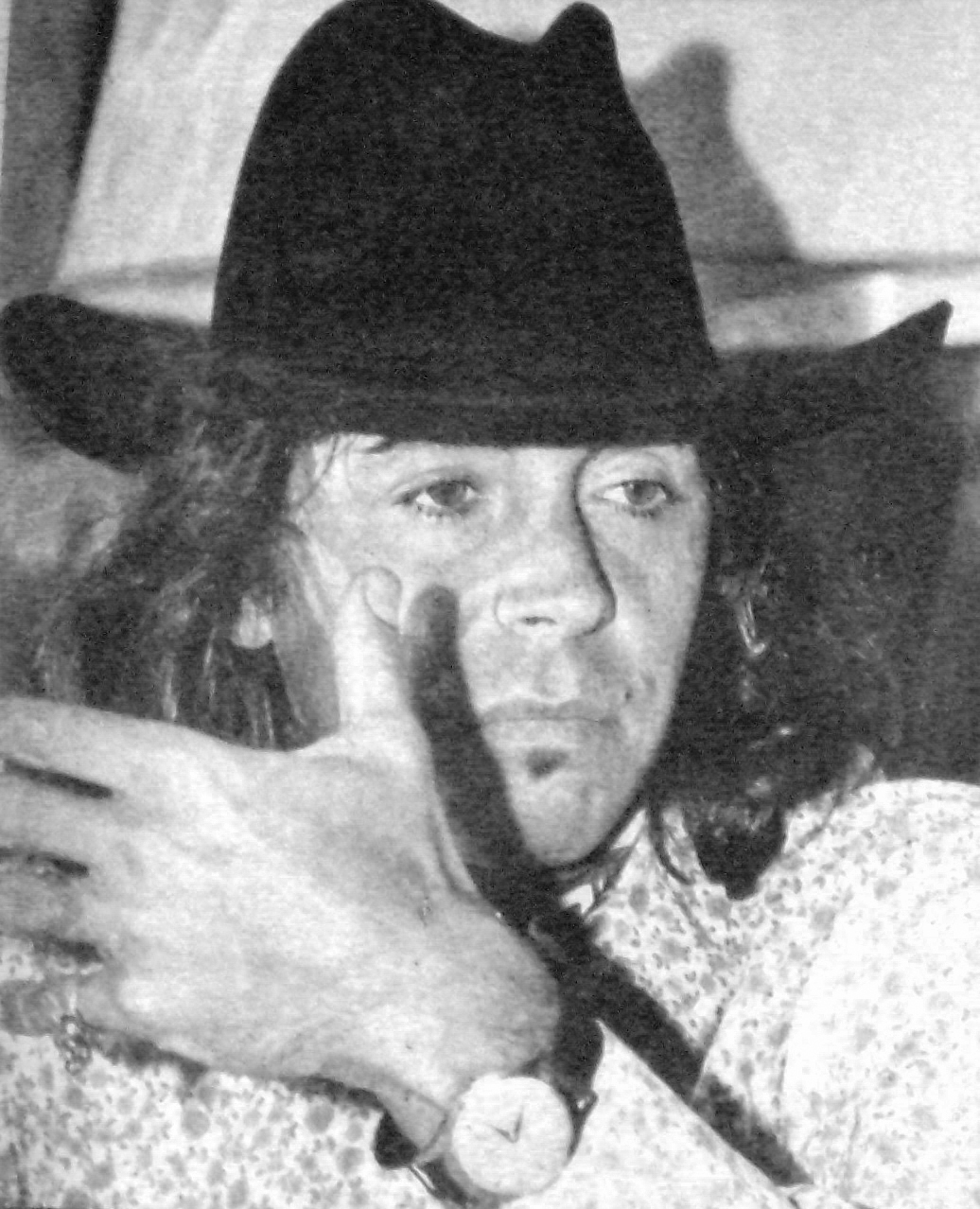
- Barbieri in 1970

Background information
- Born: Leandro Barbieri; November 28, 1932; Rosario, Santa Fe, Argentina
- Died: April 2, 2016 (aged 83) New York City, US
- Genres: Jazz; avant-garde jazz; free jazz; Latin jazz; smooth jazz
- Occupations: Musician; bandleader
- Instrument: Tenor saxophone
- Years active: 1961–2016
- Labels: Impulse!; A&M; Flying Dutchman; United Artists; ESP-Disk; Durium; Columbia

Leandro "Gato" Barbieri (November 28, 1932 – April 2, 2016) was an Argentine jazz tenor saxophonist who rose to fame during the free jazz movement in the 1960s and is known for his Latin jazz recordings of the 1970s. His nickname, Gato, is Spanish for "cat".

== Biography ==
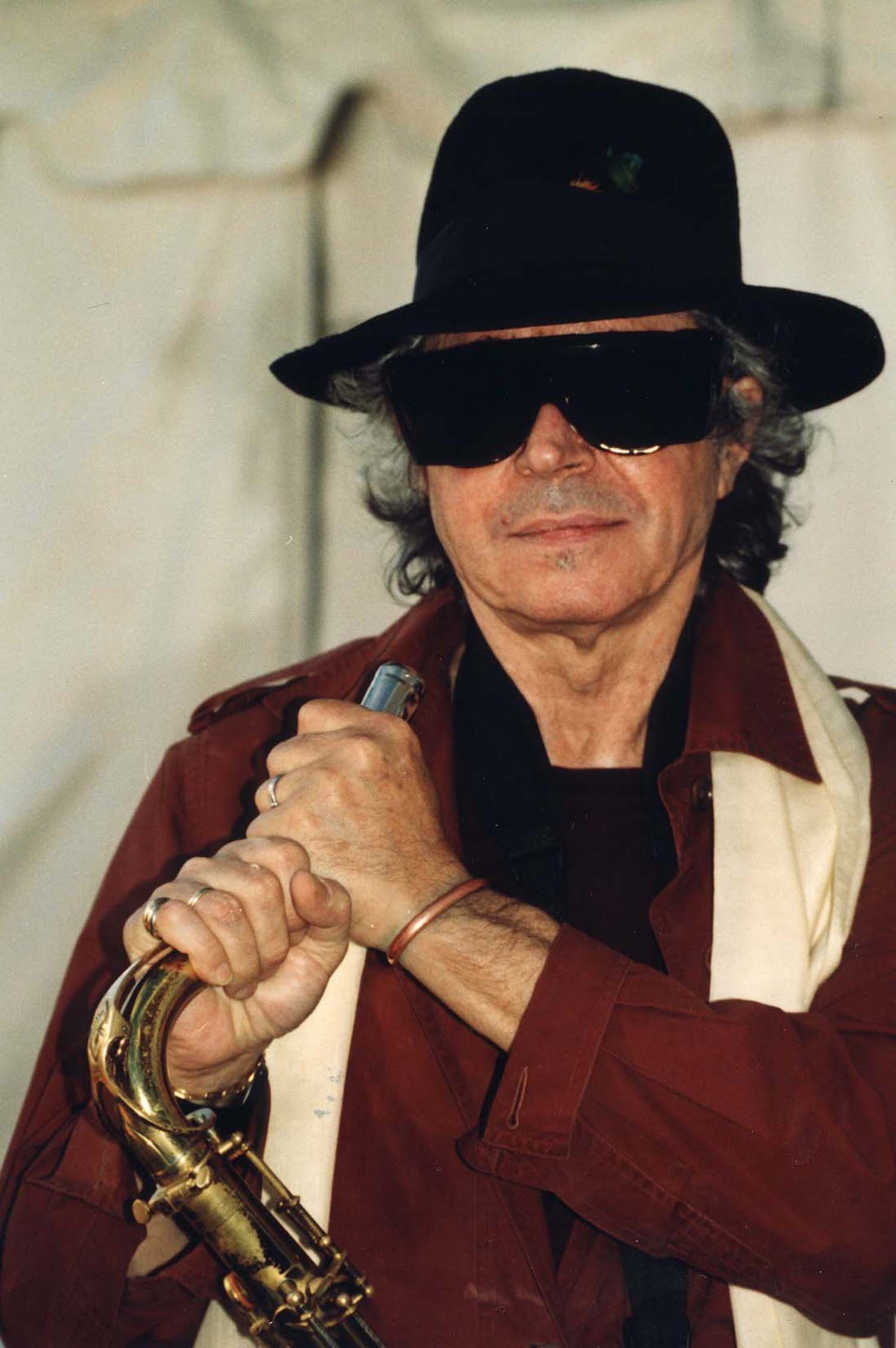
Barbieri in 1999

Born to a family of musicians, Barbieri began playing music after hearing Charlie Parker's "Now's the Time". He played the clarinet and later the alto saxophone while performing with Argentine pianist Lalo Schifrin in the late 1950s. By the early 1960s, while playing in Rome, he also worked with the trumpeter Don Cherry. By now influenced by John Coltrane's late recordings, as well as those from other free jazz saxophonists such as Albert Ayler and Pharoah Sanders, he began to develop the warm and gritty tone with which he is associated. In the late 1960s, he was fusing music from South America into his playing and contributed to multi-artist projects like Charlie Haden's Liberation Music Orchestra and Carla Bley's Escalator over the Hill. His score for Bernardo Bertolucci's 1972 film Last Tango in Paris earned him a Grammy Award and led to a record deal with Impulse! Records.

By the mid-1970s, he was recording for A&M Records and moved his music towards soul-jazz and jazz-pop. Caliente! (1976) included his best-known song, a rendition of Carlos Santana's "Europa". Caliente! and his follow-up album, Ruby Ruby (1977) were both produced by fellow musician and label co-founder Herb Alpert.

Although he continued to record and perform well into the 1980s, including composing the scores to films such as Firepower (1979) and Strangers Kiss (1983), the death of his wife Michelle led him to withdraw from the public arena. He returned to recording and performing in the late 1990s, composing original scores at the behest of friend Bahman Maghsoudlou for Amir Naderi's Manhattan by Numbers (1991) and Daryush Shokof's Seven Servants (1996). The album Qué Pasa (1997) moved more into the style of smooth jazz.

Barbieri was the inspiration for the character Zoot in the fictional Muppet band Dr. Teeth and the Electric Mayhem.

On April 2, 2016, Barbieri died of pneumonia in New York City at the age of 83.

== Personal life ==
Barbieri married his first wife Michelle in 1960. She was also his manager and musical confidant. She died of cancer in 1995 after 10 years of treatment. During that time, Barbieri stopped recording and touring to care for her. After her death, he resumed his career. He then met his second wife, Laura, who gave birth to their son Christian, in 1998.

== Discography ==
=== As leader ===
- In Search of the Mystery (ESP Disk, 1967)
- Obsession (Affinity, 1967, [1978])
- Confluence (Freedom, 1968) with Dollar Brand – also released as Hamba Khale! (1974) and I Grandi del Jazz (1976)
- The Third World (Flying Dutchman, 1969)
- Fenix (Flying Dutchman, 1971)
- El Pampero (Flying Dutchman, 1971)
- Under Fire (Flying Dutchman, 1971 [1973])
- Last Tango in Paris (United Artists, 1972)
- Bolivia (Flying Dutchman, 1973)
- Chapter One: Latin America (Impulse!, 1973)
- Chapter Two: Hasta Siempre (Impulse!, 1973)
- Chapter Three: Viva Emiliano Zapata (Impulse!, 1974)
- Yesterdays (Flying Dutchman, 1974)
- Chapter Four: Alive in New York (Impulse!, 1975)
- El Gato (Flying Dutchman, 1975 compilation) includes 1 previously unreleased track
- Caliente! (A&M, 1976)
- I Grandi del Jazz (1976) (Previously released as Confluence and Hamba Khale!)
- Ruby Ruby (A&M, 1977)
- Tropico (A&M, 1978)
- Euphoria (A&M, 1979)
- Bahia (1982)
- Apasionado (1983)
- Para Los Amigos (Doctor Jazz, 1984)
- Passion And Fire (1988)
- The Third World Revisited (1988 compilation)
- Seven Servants (1996)
- Qué Pasa (Columbia, 1997)
- Che Corazón (Columbia, 1999)
- The Shadow of The Cat (2002)
- New York Meeting (2010)

=== As sideman ===
With Don Cherry:

- Togetherness (Durium, 1965)
- Complete Communion (Blue Note, 1966)
- Live at Cafe Montmartre 1966 (3 volumes) (ESP-Disk, 1966)
- Symphony for Improvisers (Blue Note, 1966)

With Gary Burton:

- A Genuine Tong Funeral (RCA, 1967)

With the Jazz Composer's Orchestra

- The Jazz Composer's Orchestra (1968)

With Alan Shorter:

- Orgasm (Verve, 1968)

With Charlie Haden:

- Liberation Music Orchestra (Impulse!, 1969)

With Carla Bley and Paul Haines:

- Escalator Over The Hill (JCOA, 1971)
- Tropic Appetites (Watt, 1974)

With Oliver Nelson:

- Swiss Suite (Flying Dutchman, 1971)

With Antonello Venditti:

- Da Sansiro A Samarcanda (1992)

With Letizia Gambi:

- Introducing Letizia Gambi (Via Veneto Jazz, 2012)
