= Erke =

Musical instrument of Bolivian origin

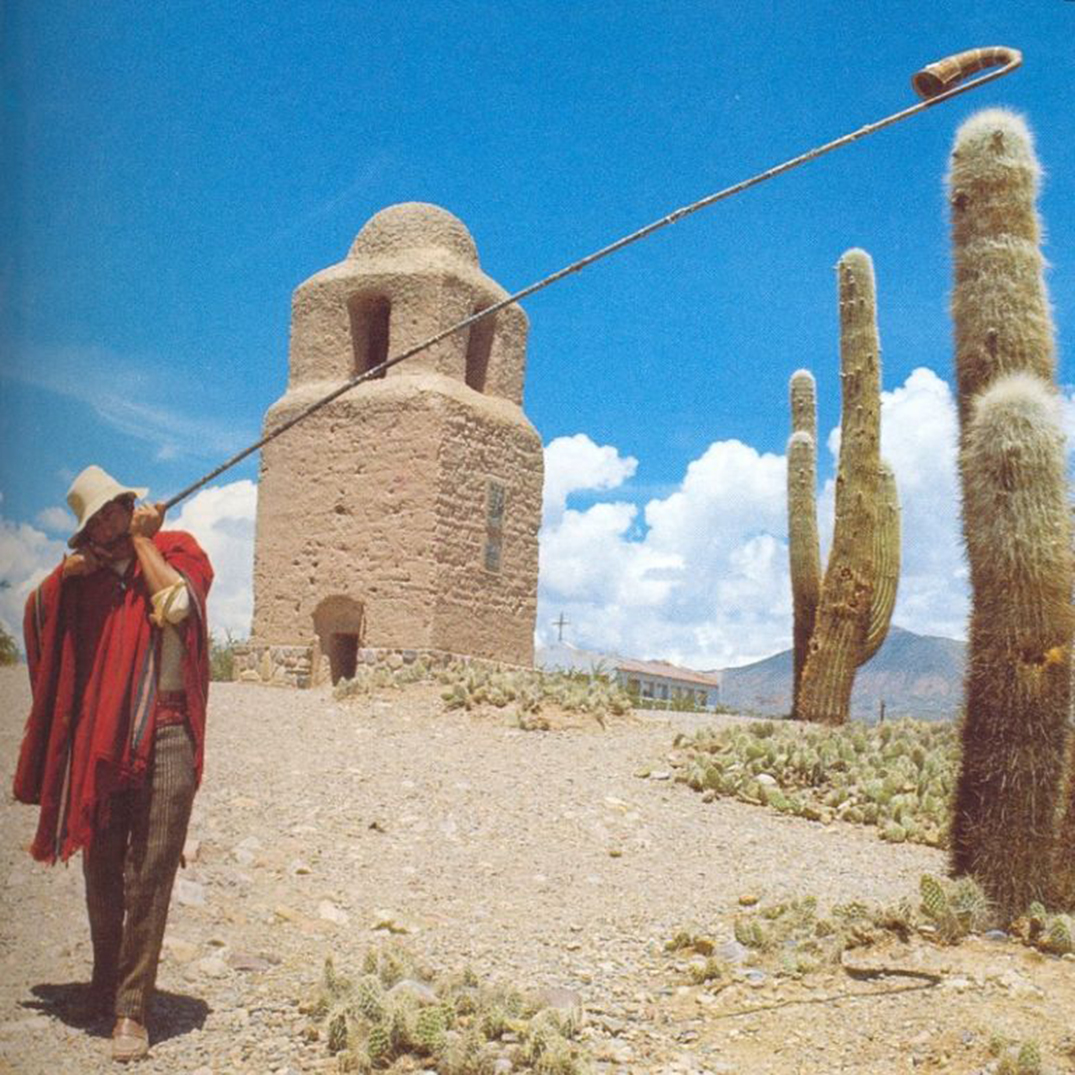
Erke of northeast Argentina

The erke (alternatively erque, coroneta, or quepa) is a large labrosone (lip reed) instrument native to the Gran Chaco of Bolivia, northern Chile, and the Argentine Northwest.

== Construction ==
The erke is composed of two or more lengths of cane joined at the ends to form a single tube. The internal nodes of the canes are removed and the exterior is often wrapped with gut or wool. The end often has an amplifier made of cow horn or brass. The instrument is blown through at the other end, and may be three to seven metres in length.

== History ==
Although in the latter half of the 20th century, Andean folkloric musical groups used the erke for secular music, among the indigenous and criollo peoples of the Andes the erke is used solely for ritual purposes.

Traditionally, but not commonly, only adult men play the erke and it is considered profane to play the erke outside of a ritual context. The erke is commonly played during winter, as it is believed that playing it in spring or summer can bring snow.

== Similar instruments ==
Among the Mapuche people, there exists a similar instrument called the trutruca.
