= George Benson discography =

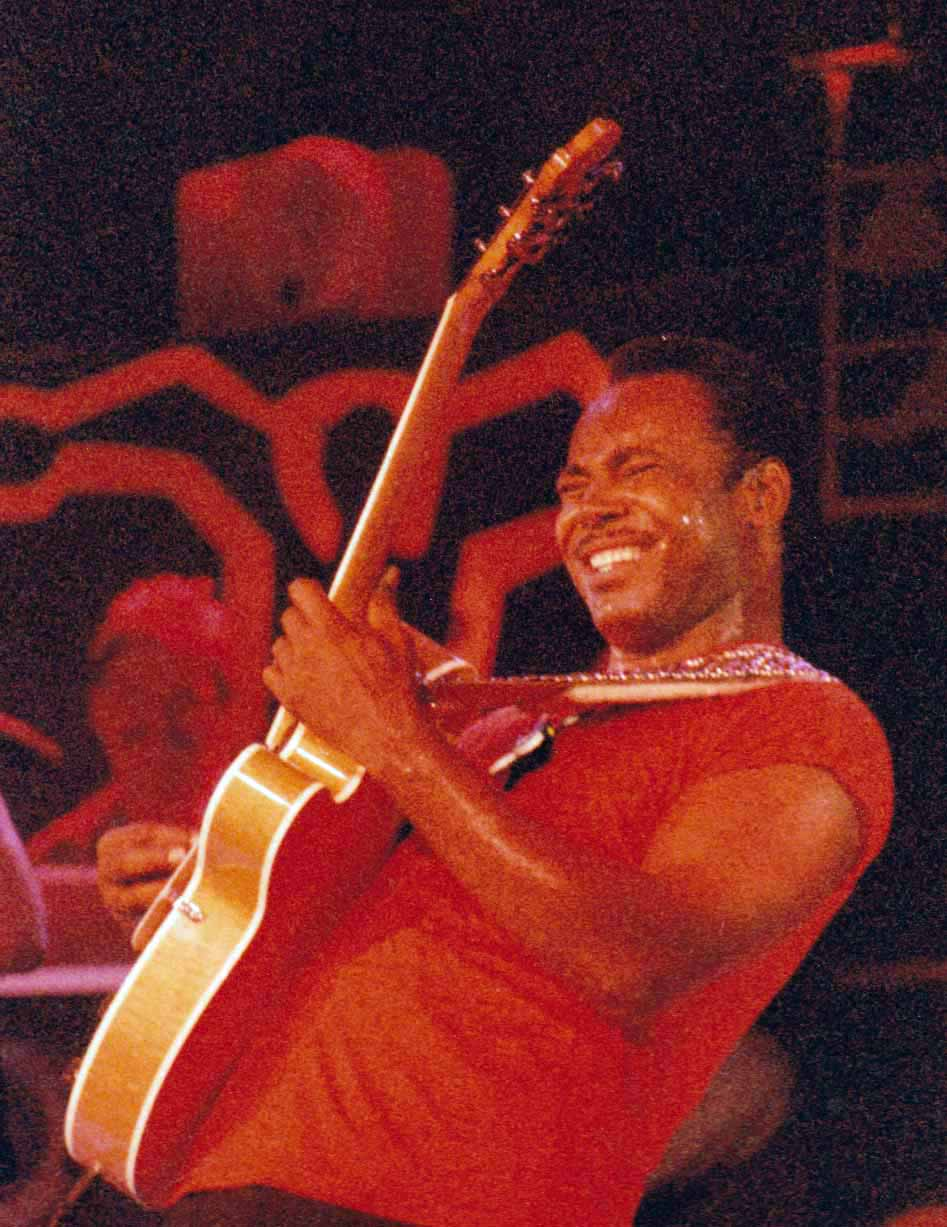
- Studio albums: 37
- Live albums: 9
- Compilation albums: 24
- Video albums: 2
- Singles & EPs: 72
- As a sideman: 115

The discography of George Benson consists of the original releases of 36 studio albums and five live albums on Prestige Records, Columbia Records, Verve Records, A&M Records, CTI Records, Warner Bros. Records, GRP Records, Concord Records, and Provogue Records, as well as two music DVDs.

== Albums ==
=== Studio albums ===
Year	Title	Label	Chart positions						Certifications
Year	Title	Label	US	US R&B	US Jazz	US Blues	CA	UK	Certifications
1964	The New Boss Guitar of George Benson (with the Brother Jack McDuff Quartet)	Prestige	—	—	—	—	–	—	
1966	It's Uptown (as The George Benson Quartet)	Columbia	—	—	—	–	—	—	
1967	The George Benson Cookbook (as The George Benson Quartet)	Columbia	—	—	—	—	—	–	
1968	Giblet Gravy	Verve	—	—	—	—	–	—	
1968	Shape of Things to Come	A&M	—	38	11	—	–	—	
1968	Goodies	Verve	—	—	—	—	–	—	
1969	Tell It Like It Is	A&M	145	43	16	—	–	—	
1970	The Other Side of Abbey Road	A&M	125	—	18	—	–	—	
1971	Beyond the Blue Horizon	CTI	—	—	15	—	—	–	
1972	White Rabbit	CTI	—	—	7	—	—	–	
1973	Body Talk	CTI	—	—	10	—	–	—	
1974	Bad Benson ^{a}	CTI	78	—	1	—	—	—	
1976	Good King Bad ^{b}	CTI	51	18	3	—	–	—	
1976	Benson & Farrell (with Joe Farrell)	CTI	100	27	3	—	–	—	
1976	Breezin'	Warner Bros.	1	1	1	—	20	—	RIAA: 3× Platinum; ARIA: 2× Platinum; BPI: Silver
1977	In Flight	Warner Bros.	9	2	1	—	10	19	RIAA: Platinum; BPI: Silver
1979	Livin' Inside Your Love	Warner Bros.	7	4	1	—	13	24	RIAA: Gold
1980	Give Me the Night	Warner Bros.	3	1	1	—	9	3	RIAA: Platinum; ARIA: Platinum; BPI: Platinum
1983	In Your Eyes	Warner Bros.	27	6	1	—	56	3	RIAA: Gold; BPI: Platinum
1983	Pacific Fire	CTI	—	—	—	—	—	—	
1984	I Got a Woman and Some Blues	A&M	—	—	—	—	–	—	
1985	20/20	Warner Bros.	45	20	3	—	70	9	RIAA: Gold; BPI: Gold
1986	While the City Sleeps...	Warner Bros.	124	21	8	—	–	13	BPI: Gold
1987	Collaboration (with Earl Klugh)	Warner Bros.	59	28	1	—	–	47	RIAA: Gold
1988	Twice the Love	Warner Bros.	76	17	10	—	–	16	BPI: Silver
1989	Tenderly	Warner Bros.	140	—	1	—	–	52	
1990	Big Boss Band (with the Count Basie Orchestra)	Warner Bros.	—	—	3	—	–	—	
1993	Love Remembers	Warner Bros.	—	50	1	—	–	—	
1996	That's Right	GRP	150	33	1	—	–	61	
1998	Standing Together	GRP	—	47	1	—	—	—	
2000	Absolute Benson	GRP	125	24	1	—	–	77	
2003	Irreplaceable	GRP	195	22	5	—	—	58	
2006	Givin' It Up (with Al Jarreau)	Concord	58	14	1	—	–	—	
2009	Songs and Stories	Concord	96	15	1	—	–	—	
2011	Guitar Man	Concord	109	—	2	—	–	—	
2013	Inspiration: A Tribute to Nat King Cole	Concord	89	—	2	—	–	80	
2019	Walking to New Orleans	Provogue	—	—	—	2	–	—	
"—" denotes releases that did not chart or were not released in that territory.

- ^a Reissued as Take Five in 1979.
- ^b Reissued as Cast Your Fate to the Wind in 1982.

=== Live albums ===
Year	Title	Label	Chart positions				Certifications
Year	Title	Label	US	US R&B	US Jazz	UK	Certifications
1976	In Concert-Carnegie Hall ^{c}	CTI	122	43	6	—	
1978	Weekend in L.A.	Warner Bros.	5	1	1	47	RIAA: Platinum; BPI: Silver
1981	Jazz on a Sunday Afternoon Vol. I (with George Duvivier, Al Harewood, Mickey Tucker) ^{d}	Accord	—	—	—	—	
1981	Jazz on a Sunday Afternoon Vol. II (with George Duvivier, Al Harewood, Mickey Tucker) ^{d}	Accord	—	—	—	—	
1982	Jazz on a Sunday Afternoon Vol. III (with George Duvivier, Al Harewood, Mickey Tucker) ^{d}	Accord	—	—	—	—	
1989	Round Midnight (with McCoy Tyner)	Jazz Door	—	—	—	—	
2005	Best of George Benson Live ^{e}	GRP	—	—	4	—	ARIA: Gold (DVD)
2007	Live from Montreux ^{f}	IMC	—	—	—	—	
2020	Weekend in London	Provogue	—	—	—	—	
"—" denotes releases that did not chart or were not released in that territory.

- ^c Reissued as In Concert – Summertime in 1982.
- ^d Jazz on a Sunday Afternoon (Vol. I, Vol. II, Vol. III) was reissued many times with such titles as: Lil Darlin' , Masquerade, The Masquerade Is Over, Live at Casa Caribe, All Blues, Blue Bossa, After Hours, Golden Legends Live, Jazz After Hours with George Benson, and others.
- ^e Video album available as Absolutely Live on DVD (2000).
- ^f Video album available as Live at Montreux 1986 on DVD (2005).

=== Compilation albums ===
Year	Title	Label	Chart positions				Certifications
Year	Title	Label	US	US R&B	US Jazz	UK	Certifications
1976	Benson Burner ^{g}	Columbia	—	—	—	—	
1976	Blue Benson ^{g}	Polydor	—	—	—	—	
1977	Summertime (UK and Netherlands release)	CBS	—	—	—	—	
1978	Space ^{g}	CTI	—	—	—	—	
1978	Mr. Mellow George Benson Greatest Hits (Japan release) ^{g}	King	—	—	—	—	
1981	The Best	A&M	—	—	—	—	
1981	The George Benson Collection ^{g}	Warner Bros.	14	5	33	19	RIAA: Gold; ARIA: Gold; BPI: Platinum
1985	The Love Songs (UK, Germany, Netherlands and Japan release)	Warner Bros.	—	—	—	1	BPI: 2× Platinum
1987	Exclusive Benson (UK release) ^{g}	Connoisseur Collection	—	—	—	—	
1989	The Best of Benson ^{i}	CBS Associated	—	—	14	—	
1990	Grand New World - Greatest Love Songs (Japan release) ^{g}	Warner Bros.	—	—	—	—	
1991	Midnight Moods (Europe release)	Warner Bros.	—	—	—	25	BPI: Gold
1994	Jazz Masters 21: George Benson	Verve	—	—	—	—	
1995	The Best of George Benson	Warner Bros.	—	—	14	—	
1997	The Best of George Benson: The Instrumentals	Warner Bros.	—	—	—	—	
1997	Talkin' Verve: George Benson ^{d}	Verve	—	—	—	—	
2000	Best of George Benson in the CTI/Kudu Years (Japan release) ^{h}	CTI	—	—	—	—	
2003	The Greatest Hits of All	Rhino	138	74	3	—	
2003	The Very Best of George Benson: The Greatest Hits of All (Europe, Brazil and Indonesia release)	Warner Bros.	—	—	—	4	BPI: Platinum
2004	Jazz Moods – Hot: George Benson	Columbia/Legacy	—	—	—	—	
2006	The Essential George Benson	Columbia/Legacy	—	—	—	—	
2010	Classic Love Songs	Rhino	—	—	—	13	BPI: Silver
2011	The Essential Collection ^{i}	Music Club Deluxe	—	—	—	—	
2015	The Ultimate Collection	Rhino	—	—	—	37	BPI: Silver
"—" denotes releases that did not chart or were not released in that territory.

- ^b Compilation containing previously unreleased material.
- ^c Compilation containing all compositions released for the first time on DVD-audio. The very first DVD-audio release of George Benson.
- ^d Compilation containing previously unreleased on CD material.

=== Original recordings for motion picture soundtracks ===
Rel.	Title	Song titles	Label	Formats
1977	Muhammad Ali In The Greatest (Original Soundtrack)	The Greatest Love of All, I Always Knew I Had It in Me (version 1), I Always Knew I Had It in Me (version 2)	Arista	LP, CD
1979	Boulevard Nights (Original Soundtrack)	Street Tattoo	Warner Bros.	LP, CD
1992	Freddie as F.R.O.7 (Original Soundtrack)	I'll Keep Your Dreams Alive (with Patti Austin)	Great Pyramid	CD

=== As sideman ===
Rel.	Performer	Title	Label	Formats
1963	Brother Jack McDuff	Brother Jack McDuff Live!	Prestige	LP, CD
1963	Brother Jack McDuff	Brother Jack at the Jazz Workshop Live!	Prestige	LP, CD
1964	Brother Jack McDuff	Prelude	Prestige	LP, CD
1964	Red Holloway with the Brother Jack McDuff Quartet	Cookin' Together	Prestige	LP, CD
1964	Brother Jack McDuff	The Dynamic Jack McDuff	Prestige	LP
1964	Joe Dukes	The Soulful Drums of Joe Dukes	Prestige	LP, CD
1964	Brother Jack McDuff	The Concert McDuff	Prestige	LP, CD
1965	Brother Jack McDuff	Hot Barbeque	Prestige	LP, CD
1965	Brother Jack McDuff	Silk and Soul	Prestige	LP
1965	Red Holloway	Red Soul	Prestige	LP
1966	Lonnie Smith	Finger-Lickin' Good	Columbia	LP
1967	Lou Donaldson	Alligator Bogaloo	Blue Note	LP, CD
1967	Brother Jack McDuff	Hallelujah Time!	Prestige	LP
1967	Roberta Peck	Extraordinary	Columbia	LP
1968	Hank Mobley	Reach Out!	Blue Note	LP, CD
1968	Brother Jack McDuff	The Midnight Sun	Prestige	LP
1968	Larry Young	Heaven on Earth	Blue Note	LP, CD
1968	Brother Jack McDuff	Soul Circle	Prestige	LP
1968	Lee Morgan	Taru	Blue Note	LP, CD
1968	Lou Donaldson	Midnight Creeper	Blue Note	LP, CD
1968	Jaki Byard	Jaki Byard with Strings!	Prestige	LP, CD
1968	Miles Davis	Miles in the Sky	Columbia	LP, CD
1968	Jimmy Smith	The Boss	Verve	LP, CD
1969	Hubert Laws	Crying Song	CTI	LP, CD
1969	Brother Jack McDuff	I Got a Woman	Prestige	LP
1969	J. J. Johnson & Kai Winding	Stonebone	A&M (Japan)	LP
1969	Brother Jack McDuff	Steppin' Out	Prestige	LP
1970	Stanley Turrentine	Sugar	CTI	LP, CD
1970	Freddie Hubbard	Straight Life	CTI	LP, CD
1970	Willis "Gator" Jackson	Mellow Blues	Trip	LP
1971	Freddie Hubbard	First Light	CTI	LP, CD
1971	Johnny "Hammond" Smith	Wild Horses Rock Steady	Kudu	LP, CD
1972	Freddie Hubbard	Sky Dive	CTI	LP, CD
1972	Airto	Free	CTI	LP, CD
1972	Hank Crawford	We Got a Good Thing Going	Kudu	LP, CD
1972	Esther Phillips	Alone Again (Naturally)	Kudu	LP, CD
1973	Don Sebesky	Giant Box	CTI	LP, CD
1973	Willis "Gator" Jackson	Funky Reggae	Trip	LP
1974	Johnny "Hammond" Smith	Higher Ground	Kudu	LP, CD
1975	Freddie Hubbard	Polar AC	CTI	LP, CD
1975	Lonnie Smith	Afro–desia	Groove Merchant	LP
1975	Hubert Laws	The Chicago Theme	CTI	LP, CD
1975	Ronnie Foster	Cheshire Cat	Blue Note	LP, CD
1975	Brother Jack McDuff	Magnetic Feel	Cadet	LP
1975	Helen Humes	The Talk Of The Town	Columbia	LP
1975	Stanley Turrentine	The Sugar Man	CTI	LP
1976	Harlem Underground Band	Harlem Underground ^{e}	Paul Winley	LP, CD
1976	Stevie Wonder	Songs in the Key of Life	Motown	LP, CD
1976	Pee Wee Ellis	Home in the Country	Savoy	LP
1976	Claus Ogerman Orchestra	Gate of Dreams	Warner Bros.	LP, CD
1977	Maynard Ferguson	Conquistador	Columbia	LP, CD
1977	Harvey Mason	Funk in a Mason Jar	Arista	LP, CD
1978	George Benson with the Harlem Underground Band	Erotic Moods ^{e}	Paul Winley	LP, CD-
1978	Tony Williams	The Joy of Flying	Columbia	LP, CD
1978	Freddie Hubbard	Super Blue	Columbia	LP, CD
1978	Deodato	Love Island	Warner Bros.	LP, CD
1979	Ronnie Foster	Delight	Columbia	LP, CD
1979	Miles Davis	Circle in the Round	Columbia	2xLP, 2xCD
1979	Chaka Khan	Chaka	Warner Bros.	LP, CD
1980	Minnie Riperton	Love Lives Forever	Capitol	LP, CD
1980	Dexter Gordon	Gotham City	Columbia	LP, CD
1980	Sesame Street	In Harmony	Warner Bros.	LP, CD
1981	Aretha Franklin	Love All the Hurt Away	Arista	LP, CD
1981	Fuse One	Silk	CTI	LP, CD
1981	Greg Phillinganes	Significant Gains	Planet	LP, CD
1981	Sadao Watanabe	Orange Express	CBS/Sony (Japan)	LP, CD
1982	Jimmy Smith	Off the Top	Elektra	LP, CD
1982	Benny Goodman	Seven Come Eleven	Columbia	LP
1982	Geoff Tyus	Geoff Tyus in Hawaii	Tyusco	LP
1983	Jorge Dalto & Superfriends	Rendezvous	Eastworld	LP, CD
1984	Jorge Dalto & Superfriends	New York Nightline	Eastworld	LP, CD
1984	Kashif	Send Me Your Love	Arista	LP, CD
1984	Bobby Womack	Poet II	Razor & Tie	LP, CD
1984	Ivan Lins	Juntos	PolyGram	LP, CD
1984	Frank Sinatra	L.A. Is My Lady	Warner Bros.	LP, CD
1984	Jean-Luc Ponty	Open Mind	Atlantic	LP, CD
1984	Stanley Turrentine	Straight Ahead	Blue Note	LP, CD
1985	Chet Atkins	Stay Tuned	Columbia	LP, CD
1985	Ronnie Cuber	Passion Fruit	King (Japan)	LP, CD
1986	Ornella Vanoni	Ornella &...	CGD	2xLP, CD
1986	Barnaby Finch	Digital Madness	Baked Potato	LP, CD
1987	Tony Bennett	Bennett/Berlin	Columbia	LP, CD
1987	Freddie Hubbard	Life Flight	Blue Note	LP, CD
1988	Chaka Khan	CK	Warner Bros.	LP, CD
1989	Quincy Jones	Back on the Block	Qwest	LP, CD
1989	Lou Rawls	At Last	Blue Note	LP, CD
1990	Jon Hendricks & Friends	Freddie Freeloader	Denon	CD
1990	Gwen Guthrie	Hot Times	Reprise	LP, CD
1991	Hank Crawford and Jimmy McGriff	Soul Survivors	Milestone	LP, CD
1992	Brother Jack McDuff	Color Me Blue	Concord Jazz	LP, CD
1994	Chet Atkins	Read My Licks	Columbia	CD
1994	Jorge Dalto	Listen Up!	Gaia	CD
1994	The Muppets	Kermit Unpigged	BMG Kidz	CD
1995	Lonnie Smith	Live at Club Mozambique	Blue Note	2xLP, CD
1997	Nuyorican Soul	Nuyorican Soul	Giant Step	6xLP, 4xLP, 2xLP, 2xCD, CD
1997	Mary J. Blige	Share My World	MCA	2xLP, CD
1998	B.B. King	King Biscuit Flower Hour Presents B.B. King	King Biscuit Flower Hour	CD
1998	Nils	Blue Planet	Brajo/Ichiban	CD
1998	Lena Horne	Being Myself	Blue Note	CD
1999	Brother Jack McDuff	Bringin' It Home	Concord Jazz	CD
1999	Kenny G	Classics in the Key of G	Arista	CD
1999	Take 6	Greatest Hits	Reprise	CD
1999	Gerald McCauley	The McCauley Sessions ^{f}	-	CD
2001	Tomatito	Paseo de los Castanos	Universal	CD
2001	Freddie Hubbard	Red Clay (Bonus Track)	CTI	CD
2001	Minnie Riperton	Petals: The Minnie Riperton Collection	The Right Stuff/EMI	CD
2003	Kelly Price	Priceless	Def Soul	CD
2003	Jools Holland's Rhythm and Blues Orchestra	Small World Big Band Vol. 2: More Friends	Rhino	CD
2005	Vanessa Williams	Everlasting Love	Lava	CD
2005	Rod Stewart	Thanks for the Memory: The Great American Songbook, Volume IV	J Records	CD
2005	The Embers	Beach Music Super Collaboration	Bluewater	CD
2005	Cafe Soul All Stars	Love Pages ^{f}	-	CD
2006	Boney James	Shine	Concord	CD
2008	Take 6	The Standard	Heads Up	CD
2010	Preston Glass	Colors of Life	Expansion (UK)	CD
2018	Gorillaz	The Now Now	Parlophone/Warner Bros. Records	LP, CD
2023	The Count Basie Orchestra	Basie Swings the Blues	Candid	CD

^e Harlem Underground Band "Harlem Underground" (1976) and George Benson with the Harlem Underground Band "Erotic Moods" (1978) are from the same session. "Erotic Moods" was credited to George Benson with The Harlem Underground Band following the success of Benson's albums Breezin' and In Flight, but is not considered a George Benson album. He wasn't the frontman and it was not his scheduled release. 2 tracks from the 1978 album were also on the 1976 album.

^f Gerald McCauley "The McCauley Sessions" and Cafe Soul All Stars "Love Pages" contains the same track with George Benson.

=== Various artists compilations ===
Rel.	Title	Song titles	Label	Formats
1971	CTI All-Stars California Concert – The Hollywood Palladium		CTI	2xLP, 2xCD
1972	CTI All-Stars Summer Jazz at the Hollywood Bowl – Live One		CTI	LP, CD
1972	CTI All-Stars Summer Jazz at the Hollywood Bowl – Live Two		CTI	LP, CD
1972	CTI All-Stars Summer Jazz at the Hollywood Bowl – Live Three		CTI	LP, CD
1975	Fire into Music	Supership (full version) (3:19)	CTI	LP
1990	Les Plus Grands Moments Du Jazz Vol. 2	The Shadow of Your Smile	Columbia	2xLP, CD
1995	(I Got No Kick Against) Modern Jazz	The Long and Winding Road	GRP	2xLP, CD
2003	A Twist of Motown	Inner City Blues	GRP	CD
2003	Songs for Life		EMI	CD
2004	Society of Singers Presents: Great Voices, Great Songs		Shout! Factory	CD
2007	Diggin' Deeper 7 – The Roots of Acid Jazz	Serbian Blue (edit) (6:30)^{g}	Sony	LP
2009	Guitar Greats – Salute to Miles Davis	All Blues, Valdez in the Country, Being with You	IMC	CD
2010	Lee Ritenour's 6 String Theory	My One and Only Love, Moon River	Concord	CD, DVD-A

^g First time "Serbian Blue" was released on vinyl.

== Singles / extended plays ==
=== Singles ===
Year	Title	Album	Chart positions							Certifications
Year	Title	Album	US	US R&B	US AC	US Dance	CA	CA AC	UK	Certifications
1954	"It Should Have Been Me #2" (as Lil' Georgie Benson)	—N/a	—	—	—	—	—	—	—	
1964	"Just Another Sunday"	The New Boss Guitar of George Benson	—	—	—	—	—	—	—	
1966	"Ain't That Peculiar" (as The George Benson Quartet)	It's Uptown	—	—	—	—	—	—	—	
1966	"The Borgia Stick" (as The George Benson Quartet)	The George Benson Cookbook	—	—	—	—	—	—	—	
1968	"Don't Let Me Lose This Dream"	Shape of Things to Come	—	—	—	—	—	—	—	
1969	"My Woman's Good to Me"	Tell It Like It Is	113	—	—	—	—	—	—	
1975	"Supership" (as George 'Bad' Benson)	—N/a	105	98	—	—	—	—	30	
1976	"Summertime/2001"	—N/a	—	—	—	—	—	—	—	
1976	"This Masquerade"	Breezin'	10	3	6	16	8	8	—	
1976	"Breezin'"	Breezin'	63	55	13	—	–	16	—	
1977	"Everything Must Change"	In Flight	106	34	—	—	—	—	—	
1977	"Nature Boy"	In Flight	—	—	—	—	—	—	26	
1977	"The World Is a Ghetto"	In Flight	—	—	—	—	—	—	—	
1977	"Gonna Love You More"	In Flight	71	41	—	—	—	—	—	
1977	"The Greatest Love of All"	Muhammad Ali In The Greatest	24	2	22	—	27	42	27	
1978	"On Broadway"	Weekend in L.A.	7	2	25	—	13	9	—	
1978	"Lady Blue"	Weekend in L.A.	—	39	—	—	—	—	—	
1979	"Love Ballad"	Livin' Inside Your Love	18	3	12	—	24	23	29	
1979	"Unchained Melody"	Livin' Inside Your Love	—	55	27	—	—	—	—	
1979	"Hey Girl"	Livin' Inside Your Love	—	—	—	—	—	—	—	
1980	"Give Me the Night"	Give Me the Night	4	1	26	2	22	–	7	BPI: Gold
1980	"Love X Love"	Give Me the Night	61	9	—	—	—	—	10	
1980	"Turn Out the Lamplight"	Give Me the Night	109	33	9	—	—	—	—	
1981	"What's on Your Mind"	Give Me the Night	—	—	—	—	—	—	45	
1981	"Love All the Hurt Away" (with Aretha Franklin)	Love All the Hurt Away; The George Benson Collection	46	6	—	—	—	—	49	
1981	"Turn Your Love Around"	The George Benson Collection	5	1	9	32	10	5	29	
1982	"Never Give Up on a Good Thing"	The George Benson Collection	52	16	29	—	—	—	14	
1983	"Inside Love (So Personal)"	In Your Eyes	43	3	35	7	–	5	57	
1983	"Lady Love Me (One More Time)"	In Your Eyes	30	21	4	—	–	6	11	
1983	"Feel Like Making Love"	In Your Eyes	—	—	—	—	—	—	28	
1983	"In Your Eyes"	In Your Eyes	—	—	30	–	—	7	7	
1984	"Late at Night"	In Your Eyes	—	—	—	—	—	—	86	
1984	"20/20"	20/20	48	15	15	—	—	5	29	
1985	"I Just Wanna Hang Around You"	20/20	102	24	7	—	—	—	93	
1985	"Beyond the Sea"	20/20	—	—	—	—	—	—	60	
1985	"New Day"	20/20	—	87	—	—	—	—	—	
1985	"Nothing's Gonna Change My Love for You"	20/20	—	—	—	—	—	—	—	
1985	"No One Emotion (remix)"	20/20	—	—	—	—	—	—	76	
1986	"Kisses in the Moonlight"	While the City Sleeps...	—	13	31	—	—	—	60	
1986	"Shiver"	While the City Sleeps...	—	16	—	—	—	—	19	
1987	"Teaser"	While the City Sleeps...	—	—	—	—	—	—	45	
1987	"Since You're Gone" (with Earl Klugh)	Collaboration	—	—	—	—	—	—	—	
1988	"Dreamin'"" (with Earl Klugh)	Collaboration	—	—	—	—	—	—	—	
1988	"Let's Do It Again"	Twice the Love	—	8	—	—	—	—	56	
1988	"Twice the Love"	Twice the Love	—	23	—	32	—	—	91	
1989	"Good Habit"	Twice the Love	—	—	—	—	—	—	—	
1989	"Here, There & Everywhere"	Tenderly	—	—	—	—	—	—	—	
1990	"Baby Workout" (with the Count Basie Orchestra)	Big Boss Band	—	—	—	—	—	—	—	
1990	"Grand New World"	Grand New World – Greatest Love Songs	—	—	—	—	—	—	—	
1992	"I'll Keep Your Dreams Alive" (with Patti Austin)	Freddie as F.R.O.7	—	—	—	—	—	—	68	
1993	"Love of My Life"	Love Remembers	—	123	—	—	—	—	87	
1993	"I'll Be Good to You"	Love Remembers	—	123	—	—	—	—	—	
1996	"You Can Do It (Baby)" (with Nuyorican Soul)	Nuyorican Soul	—	—	—	—	—	—	—	
1996	"Holdin' On"	That's Right	—	109	—	—	—	—	—	
1996	"Summer Love"	That's Right	—	—	—	—	—	—	—	
1997	"Song for My Brother (Masters at Work Mix)"	That's Right	—	115	—	6	—	—	—	
1998	"Standing Together"	Standing Together	101	62	18	—	—	—	—	
1998	"Cruise Control"	Standing Together	—	—	—	—	—	—	—	
1998	"My Father, My Son"	—N/a	—	—	—	—	—	—	152	
2000	"The Ghetto" (with Joe Sample)	Absolute Benson	—	—	—	28	—	—	—	
2004	"Cell Phone (Blacksmith remix)"	Irreplaceable	—	—	—	—	—	—	—	
2004	"Irreplaceable"	Irreplaceable	—	—	—	—	—	—	—	
2004	"Softly, as in a Morning Sunrise"	Irreplaceable	—	—	—	—	—	—	—	
2006	"Mornin'" (with Al Jarreau)	Givin' It Up	—	—	—	—	—	—	—	
2006	"Ordinary People" (with Al Jarreau)	Givin' It Up	—	—	—	—	—	—	—	
2008	"New York City"	The Embers - Beach Music	—	—	—	—	—	—	—	
2009	"Family Reunion"	Songs and Stories	–	105	—	—	—	—	—	
2009	"Living in High Definition"	Songs and Stories	—	—	—	—	—	—	—	
2010	"Show Me the Love"	Songs and Stories	—	—	—	—	–	—	—	
"—" denotes releases that did not chart or were not released in that territory.

=== Singles as sideman ===
Rel.	Performer	Title	Album	Label	Formats
1964	The Nomos	Redwood City/Step Out and Get It	non-album single	Prestige	7"
1981	Aretha Franklin and George Benson	Love All The Hurt Away	The George Benson Collection, Love All the Hurt Away	Arista	12", 7"
1998	Mary J. Blige	Seven Days	Share My World	MCA	12", CD
2018	Gorillaz featuring George Benson	Humility	The Now Now	Parlophone; Warner Bros.	Digital
2025	Joe Bonamassa and George Benson	There Must Be A Better World Somewhere	B.B. King's Blues Summit 100: Celebrating the King of the Blues	Keeping the Blues Alive Records	Digital

=== Extended plays ===
Rel.	Title	Label	Formats	Notes
1993	Love of My Life	Warner Bros.	12", CD	UK only
1993	Kiss and Make Up	Warner Bros.	12"	-
1996	When Love Comes Calling	GRP	12"	Europe only
2004	The Irreplaceable Session - EP	GRP	Download	E-Single

== Miscellaneous recordings ==
=== Remixes ===
Rel.	Title	Song titles	Performer	Label	Formats
1998	House Nation 181	Give Me the Night (DJ Phats Remix)	Various artists	DMC	12", CD^{h}
2004	What Is Hip? (Remix Project) Volume One	This Masquerade (N.O.W. Mix)	Various artists	Warner Bros. Records	2xLP, CD
2004	Give Me the Night^{i}	Give Me the Night	George Benson & Lemar	Not on label	12" (Promo)
2005	Give Me the Night^{i}	Give Me the Night (Soul Avengerz Piano Dub); Give Me the Night (Identity Full Vocal Mix); Give Me the Night (Soul Avengerz Classic Mix)	George Benson & Lemar	Not on label	12" (Promo)

^h Later was released on CD on various artists' compilation "The Stress Decade: Adventures In Clubland 1990-99" in 1999 and on various artists' compilation "DMC Classic Remixes Volume One - Legendary Producer Mixes" in 2009.
^i George Benson & Lemar "Give Me the Night" is a kind of cover version and remake. It contains a vocals by Lemar and George Benson. It was released only as promo 12" vinyl single in 2004 (with original 2004 house mix) and in 2005 (with remixes by Soul Avengerz and Identity). The song was performed live in 2006 at UK Music Awards by Lemar & George Benson.

=== Recordings for commercials ===
Rel.	Title	Song title	Rec.	Performer	Label	Formats
1996	Great Cola Commercials Vol. 2	Coke Is It! (1:04)	1985	Various artists	-	CD

=== Radio shows ===
Rel.	Title	Rec.	Label	Formats
1977	Nightbird & Company w. Alison Steele	1977	U.S. Army Reserve (Narwood Productions)	LP
1979	The Robert W. Morgan: Special of the Week	1979	Watermark Inc.	LP
1985	The Hot Ones	1985	RKO & IS Inc	LP

=== Interviews ===
Rel.	Title	For the album	Label	Formats
1978	The Rolling Stones / George Benson	What's It All About?	What's It All About?	7"
1989	Words and Music	Tenderly	Warner Bros.	CD
1990	Words and Music	Big Boss Band	Warner Bros.	CD
1993	Words and Music	Love Remembers	Warner Bros.	CD
2006	Givin' It Up Radio Special	Givin' It Up	Concord	2xCD

== Productions ==
=== Albums produced by George Benson ===
Rel.	Performer	Title	Song titles	Label	Formats
1974	Ronnie Foster	On the Avenue		Blue Note	LP
1975	Ronnie Foster	Cheshire Cat		Blue Note	LP, CD
1978	Phil Upchurch	Phil Upchurch	It's Almost Five, Foolin' Around, Cyrenna	TK	LP
1980	Brother Jack McDuff	Kisses	Say Sumpin' Nice	Sugar Hill	LP
1985	Chet Atkins	Stay Tuned	Sunrise	Columbia	LP, CD
1987	Kevin Eubanks	The Heat of Heat	First Things First	GRP	LP, CD

=== Singles produced by George Benson ===
Rel.	Performer	Title	Song titles	From the album	Label	Formats	Notes
1980	Brother Jack McDuff	Kisses / Say Sumpin' Nice	Say Sumpin' Nice	Kisses	Sugar Hill	7"	Credited as Produced by George Benson & Jack McDuff
1985	Chet Atkins	Sunrise	Sunrise (Edited Version) (both sides)	Stay Tuned	Columbia	12", 7"	Promo single

== Videography ==
=== Video albums ===
Rel.	Title	Rec.	Label	Formats
2000	Absolutely Live	2000	Eagle Rock	DVD, VHS, LD (Japan only), 2xVCD (Hong Kong only)
2005	Live at Montreux 1986	1986	Eagle Rock	DVD

=== Educational courses ===
Rel.	Title	Label	Formats	Notes
2006	The Art of Jazz Guitar	Hot Licks	DVD	as "Hot Licks" series

=== Video releases with George Benson's participation ===
Rel.	Performer	Title	Rec.	Titles	Label	Formats	Notes
1986	Frank Sinatra with Quincy Jones and Orchestra	Portrait of an Album	1984	-	MGM/UA	LD, VHS	-
1988	Various	Dance - October '88	1988	Let's Do It Again (Music Video)	Lawrence	VHS	Promo VHS
1997	Nuyorican Soul	Nuyorican Soul EPK	1997	-	GRP	VHS	-
2001	Chet Atkins	A Life in Music	2000	-	Image	DVD, VHS	-
2001	Various	42nd Grammy Awards	2000	I Can't Give You Anything But Love (Live) (with Diana Krall & Erykah Badu)	Sony	DVD	-
2003	Various	Count Basie at Carnegie Hall	1981	-	-	DVD	-
2003	Various	Later... with Jools Holland: Legends	1998	On Broadway (Live)	Warner	DVD	-
2006	Various	The Midnight Special: 1976	1976	This Masquerade (Live)	Guthy-Renker	DVD	-
2007	Various	The Midnight Special: More 1976	1976	Breezin' (Live) (with Carlos Santana)	Guthy-Renke	DVD	-
2006	Tal Farlow	Talmage Farlow (a film by Lorenzo DeStefano)	1981	Interview	-	DVD	-
2006	Tal Farlow	The Legendary Guitar of Tal Farlow	2006	Interview	Hot Licks	DVD	-
2010	Michel Legrand & Friends	Fifty Years of Music & Movies	2010	-	-	DVD	-
2011	Various	Tribute to Miles Davis	1992	-	Imv Blueline	DVD	-

=== Music videos ===
Year	Title
1980	Give Me the Night
1981	Never Give Up on a Good Thing
1985	20/20
1986	Kisses in the Moonlight
1987	Dreamin'
1988	Twice the Love
1988	Let's Do It Again
1993	Love of My Life

=== Filmography ===
Year	Title	Role	Notes
1978	Sgt. Pepper's Lonely Hearts Club Band	Our Guests at Heartland	
1985	The New Mike Hammer	George Langdon	Episode: "Deadly Reunion"
1986	The New Mike Hammer	Sweet Billy Marvel	Episode: "Harlem Nocturne"
1992	Top of the Pops	Himself	1 episode
2022	Better Nate Than Ever	Himself	

=== Live performances ===
Year	Title
1976	Breezin'
1981	Turn Your Love Around
1983	Lady Love Me (One More Time)
1985	Nothing's Gonna Change My Love for You

=== Music videos with George Benson's participation ===
Year	Performer	Title
As performer
1998	Mary J. Blige	Seven Days
As actor
1996	Nuyorican Soul feat. India	Runaway
