= The Greatest Hits of All =

Greatest hits album by George Benson
- Released: July 8, 2003
- Recorded: 1976–1998
- Genre: Smooth jazz; R&B; Soul
- Length: 76:51
- Label: Warner Bros.; Rhino
- Producer: George Benson; Scott Galloway; David McLees

Professional ratings
Review scores
Source	Rating
AllMusic	4.5/5 stars

The Greatest Hits of All is a compilation album by American singer and guitarist George Benson, released on July 8, 2003, by Warner Bros. Records and Rhino Entertainment. The compilation received this title for containing the greatest hits of Benson's career and also in reference to the song "The Greatest Love of All", originally recorded by Benson in 1977 especially to be the main theme of the film The Greatest, a biopic of the boxer Muhammad Ali. The song is featured on this album alongside Benson's other big hits. The songs are in chronological order, between 1976 and 1998, since "This Masquerade" and "Breezin'", including his most famous hits like "On Broadway", "Give Me the Night", "Turn Your Love Around", "Lady Love Me (One More Time)", "Kisses in the Moonlight" and others. The compilation entered the Billboard and reached number 3 on the Jazz Albums. At the end of the year, the album ranked number 15 on the Top Contemporary Jazz Albums. The album also ranked number 74 on R&B Albums and number 138 on Billboard 200.

A different international version of this album was also released, entitled The Very Best of George Benson: The Greatest Hits of All.

== Track listing ==
These are "the greatest hits of all" present in this Benson compilation:

No.	Title	Writer(s)	Original Album	Length
1.	"This Masquerade"	Leon Russell	Breezin'	3:21
2.	"Breezin'"	Bobby Womack	Breezin'	5:40
3.	"The Greatest Love of All"	Michael Masser, Linda Creed	The Greatest soundtrack	3:34
4.	"On Broadway"	Barry Mann, Cynthia Weil, Jerry Leiber and Mike Stoller	Weekend in L.A.	5:13
5.	"Love Ballad"	Skip Scarborough	Livin' Inside Your Love	4:19
6.	"Unchained Melody"	Alex North, Hy Zaret	Livin' Inside Your Love	3:56
7.	"Give Me the Night"	Rod Temperton	Give Me the Night	3:42
8.	"Love X Love"	Rod Temperton	Give Me the Night	3:50
9.	"Turn Your Love Around"	Bill Champlin, Jay Graydon, Steve Lukather	The George Benson Collection	3:51
10.	"Love All the Hurt Away" (with Aretha Franklin)	Sam Dees	Love All the Hurt Away	4:08
11.	"Never Give Up on a Good Thing"	Michael Garvin, Tom Shapiro	The George Benson Collection	4:05
12.	"Being With You"	Omar Hakim	In Your Eyes	3:54
13.	"Lady Love Me (One More Time)"	James Newton Howard, David Paich	In Your Eyes	4:01
14.	"20/20"	Randy Goodrum, Steve Kipner	20/20	4:05
15.	"I Just Wanna Hang Around You"	Cruz Sembello, Danny Sembello, John Sembello, Michael Sembello	20/20	3:54
16.	"Kisses in the Moonlight"	Jeffrey Cohen, Preston Glass, Narada Michael Walden	While the City Sleeps...	3:55
17.	"Shiver"	Preston Glass, Suzanne Valentine, Narada Michael Walden	While the City Sleeps...	3:35
18.	"Let's Do It Again"	Curtis Mayfield	Twice the Love	3:40
19.	"Standing Together"	Steve Dubin, Manuel Seal	Standing Together	4:08
Total length:				76:51

== Chart positions ==
=== Weekly charts ===
Chart (2003)	Peak position
US Jazz Albums	3
US Top R&B/Hip-Hop Albums	74
US Billboard 200	138

=== Year-end charts ===
Chart (2003)	Position
US Top Contemporary Jazz Albums	15

== Personnel ==
Information taken from the back cover of the compilation:

Compilation producers:

- George Benson
- Scott Galloway
- David McLees

Songs producers:

- Tommy LiPuma (tracks 1, 2, 4, 5, 6)
- Michael Masser (track 3)
- Quincy Jones (tracks 7, 8)
- Jay Graydon (track 9, 11)
- Arif Mardin (tracks 10, 12, 13)
- Russ Titelman (tracks 14, 15)
- Narada Michael Walden (tracks 16, 17)
- Preston Glass (track 17)
- David Lewis, Wayne Lewis, Jonathan Lewis (track 18)
- Paul Brown (track 19)

Executive producer:

- Dennis Turner

Sound producer:

- Bill Inglot

Management:

- Turner Management Group, Inc.
- Dennis Turner
- Stephanie Gurevitz-Gonzalez
