= The Very Best of George Benson: The Greatest Hits of All =

Greatest hits album by George Benson
- Released: 2003 (in Europe, Brazil and Indonesia)
- Recorded: 1976–1986
- Genre: Smooth jazz; R&B; Soul
- Length: 79:36
- Label: Warner Bros.
- Producer: George Benson; Scott Galloway; David McLees

Professional ratings
Review scores
Source	Rating
AllMusic	3.5/5 stars

The Very Best of George Benson: The Greatest Hits of All is a compilation album by American singer and guitarist George Benson, released in 2003 by Warner Bros. Records. The album features some of the greatest hits of Benson's career in ten years of career, recorded between 1976 and 1986. This compilation is an international version of The Greatest Hits of All, released in the United States that same year, however, it is a different album, with other Benson hits that had not been included in the American version. The order of the tracks is random, not chronological. This album includes tracks like "Nothing's Gonna Change My Love for You" (released as a single in Europe in 1985), "In Your Eyes" (success in the United Kingdom and Brazil in 1983), "You Are The Love of My Life" (duet with Roberta Flack) and Benson cover versions for "Feel Like Makin' Love", "Nature Boy" and "Moody's Mood" (duet with Patti Austin).

== Track listing ==
These are "the greatest hits of all" present in this Benson compilation:

No.	Title	Writer(s)	Original Album	Length
1.	"Give Me the Night"	Rod Temperton	Give Me the Night	3:42
2.	"Turn Your Love Around"	Bill Champlin, Jay Graydon, Steve Lukather	The George Benson Collection	3:50
3.	"Never Give Up on a Good Thing"	Michael Garvin, Tom Shapiro	The George Benson Collection	4:05
4.	"Love X Love"	Rod Temperton	Give Me the Night	3:50
5.	"Nothing's Gonna Change My Love for You"	Michael Masser, Gerry Goffin	20/20	4:01
6.	"The Greatest Love of All"	Michael Masser, Linda Creed	The Greatest soundtrack	3:34
7.	"Feel Like Making Love"	Gene McDaniels	In Your Eyes	4:25
8.	"Breezin'"	Bobby Womack	Breezin'	5:41
9.	"This Masquerade"	Leon Russell	Breezin'	3:21
10.	"In Your Eyes"	Michael Masser, Dan Hill	In Your Eyes	3:22
11.	"You Are The Love of My Life" (with Roberta Flack)	Michael Masser, Linda Creed	20/20	2:53
12.	"Lady Love Me (One More Time)"	James Newton Howard, David Paich	In Your Eyes	4:01
13.	"Kisses in the Moonlight"	Jeffrey Cohen, Preston Glass, Narada Michael Walden	While the City Sleeps...	3:55
14.	"Love All the Hurt Away" (with Aretha Franklin)	Sam Dees	Love All the Hurt Away	4:08
15.	"Being With You"	Omar Hakim	In Your Eyes	3:55
16.	"Moody's Mood" (with Patti Austin)	Eddie Jefferson, James Moody	Give Me the Night	3:27
17.	"Nature Boy"	eden ahbez	In Flight	4:21
18.	"Love Ballad"	Skip Scarborough	Livin' Inside Your Love	4:17
19.	"Shiver"	Preston Glass, Suzanne Valentine, Narada Michael Walden	While the City Sleeps...	3:35
20.	"On Broadway"	Barry Mann, Cynthia Weil, Jerry Leiber and Mike Stoller	Weekend in L.A.	5:13
Total length:				79:36

== Personnel ==
Information taken from the back cover of the compilation:

Compilation producers:

- George Benson
- Scott Galloway
- David McLees

Songs producers:

- Quincy Jones (tracks 1, 4, 16)
- Jay Graydon (tracks 2, 3)
- Michael Masser (tracks 5, 6, 11)
- Arif Mardin (tracks 7, 10, 12, 14, 15)
- Tommy LiPuma (tracks 8, 9, 17, 18, 20)
- Narada Michael Walden (tracks 13, 19)
- Preston Glass (track 19)

Executive producer:

- Dennis Turner

Sound producer:

- Bill Inglot

Management:

- Turner Management Group, Inc.
- Dennis Turner
- Stephanie Gurevitz-Gonzalez

== Charts ==
Chart (2003)	Peak position
Australian (ARIA Charts)	69

== Certifications ==
Region	Certification	Certified units/sales
United Kingdom (BPI)	Platinum	300,000^{^}
^{^} Shipments figures based on certification alone.
