= List of UK Jazz & Blues Albums Chart number ones of 2003 =

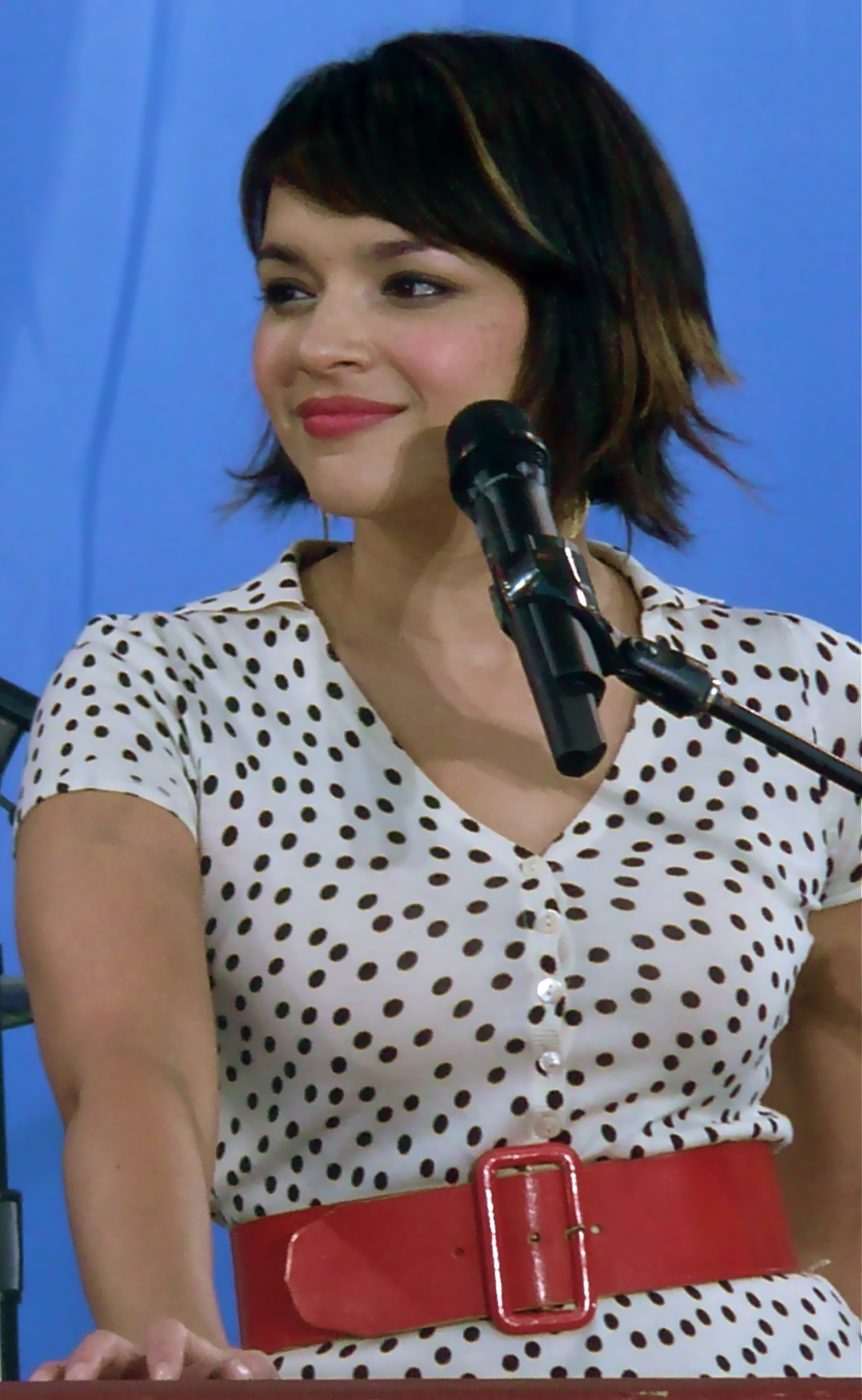
Norah Jones spent 30 weeks at number one on the UK Jazz & Blues Albums Chart in 2003 with her debut album Come Away with Me, including a run of 19 consecutive weeks from February to June.

The UK Jazz & Blues Albums Chart is a record chart which ranks the best-selling jazz and blues albums in the United Kingdom. Compiled and published by the Official Charts Company, the data is based on each album's weekly physical sales, digital downloads and streams. In 2003, 52 charts were published with six albums at number one. The first number-one album of the year was Come Away with Me, the debut album by Norah Jones, which spent the first five weeks of the year atop the chart to finish off a run of 28 consecutive weeks at number one. The last number-one album of the year was Twentysomething, the third album by Jamie Cullum.

The most successful album on the UK Jazz & Blues Albums Chart in 2003 was Come Away with Me, which spent a total of 30 weeks at number one over three spells of five weeks from January to February, 19 weeks from February to June, and six weeks from August to October. The George Benson compilation The Very Best of George Benson: The Greatest Hits of All was number one for a single nine-week stretch between 29 June and 30 August, As Time Goes By: The Great American Songbook, Volume II by Rod Stewart spent five weeks atop the chart. Come Away with Me finished 2003 as the fifth best-selling album of the year in the UK.

== Chart history ==
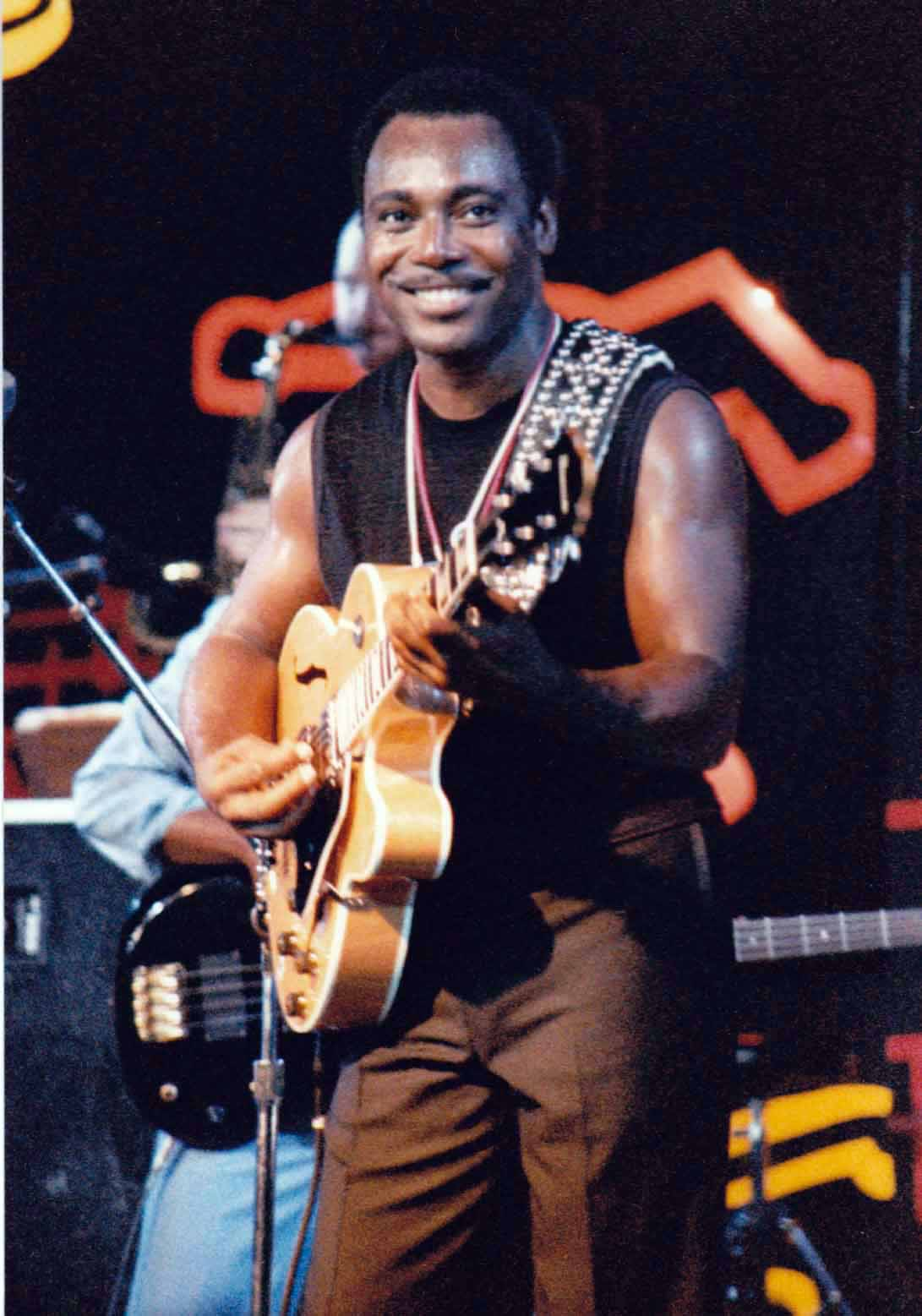
George Benson spent nine weeks at number one in 2003 with the compilation The Very Best of George Benson: The Greatest Hits of All.

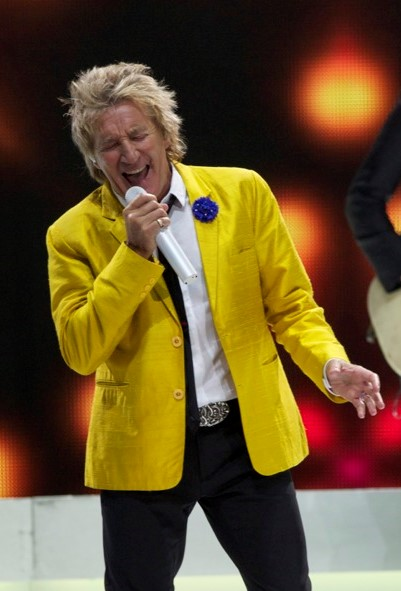
As Time Goes By: The Great American Songbook, Volume II by Rod Stewart was number one for five weeks during 2003.

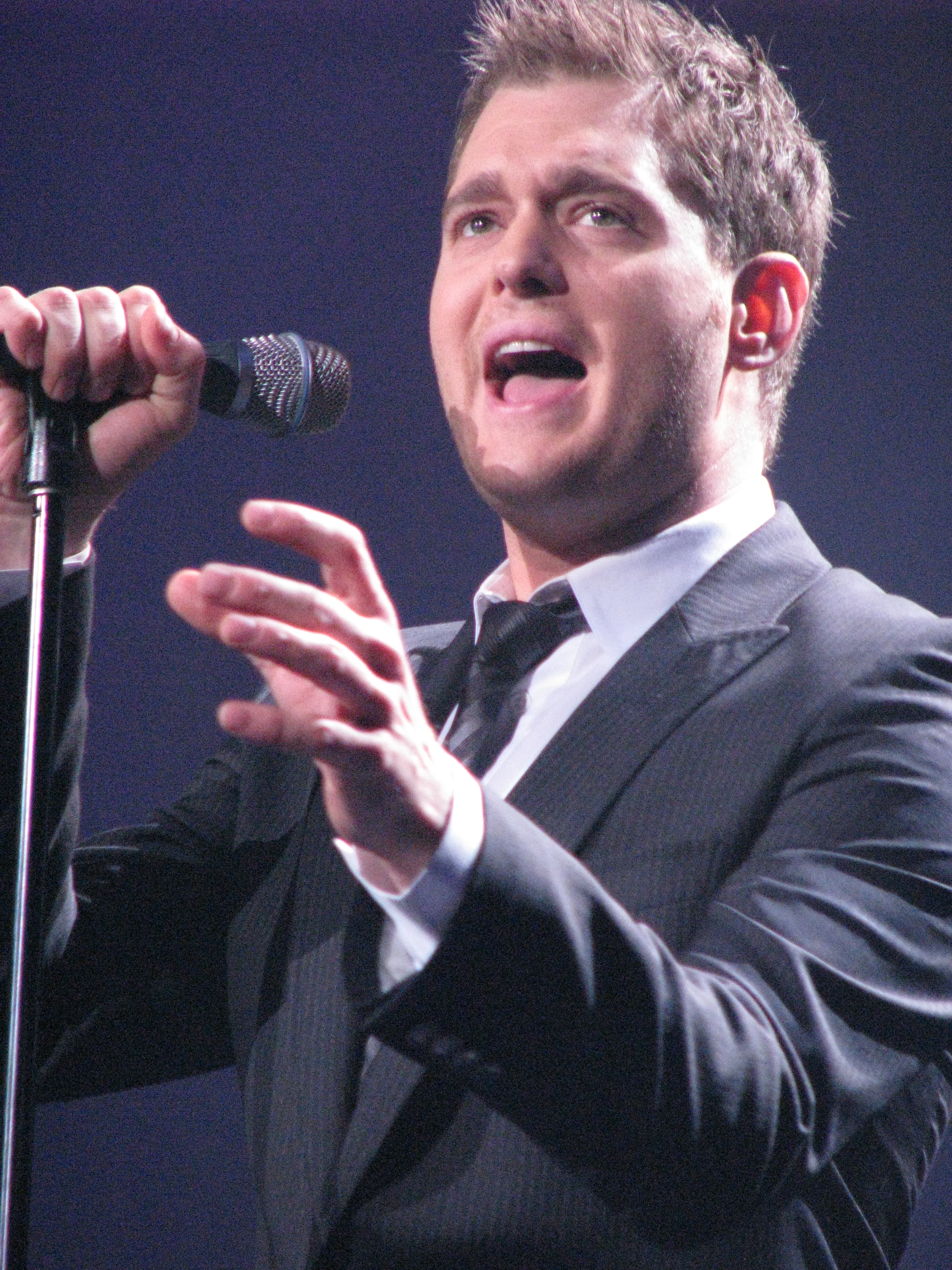
Michael Bublé topped the UK Jazz & Blues Albums Chart for the first time with his 2003 self-titled album, which spent four weeks at number one over two spells.

Key
†	Indicates best-selling jazz/blues album of 2003

Issue date	Album	Artist(s)	Record label(s)	Ref.
5 January	Come Away with Me †	Norah Jones	Parlophone	
12 January	Come Away with Me †	Norah Jones	Parlophone	
19 January	Come Away with Me †	Norah Jones	Parlophone	
26 January	Come Away with Me †	Norah Jones	Parlophone	
2 February	Come Away with Me †	Norah Jones	Parlophone	
9 February	Gold	Ella Fitzgerald	Verve	
16 February	Come Away with Me †	Norah Jones	Parlophone	
23 February	Come Away with Me †	Norah Jones	Parlophone	
2 March	Come Away with Me †	Norah Jones	Parlophone	
9 March	Come Away with Me †	Norah Jones	Parlophone	
16 March	Come Away with Me †	Norah Jones	Parlophone	
23 March	Come Away with Me †	Norah Jones	Parlophone	
30 March	Come Away with Me †	Norah Jones	Parlophone	
6 April	Come Away with Me †	Norah Jones	Parlophone	
13 April	Come Away with Me †	Norah Jones	Parlophone	
20 April	Come Away with Me †	Norah Jones	Parlophone	
27 April	Come Away with Me †	Norah Jones	Parlophone	
4 May	Come Away with Me †	Norah Jones	Parlophone	
11 May	Come Away with Me †	Norah Jones	Parlophone	
18 May	Come Away with Me †	Norah Jones	Parlophone	
25 May	Come Away with Me †	Norah Jones	Parlophone	
1 June	Come Away with Me †	Norah Jones	Parlophone	
8 June	Come Away with Me †	Norah Jones	Parlophone	
15 June	Come Away with Me †	Norah Jones	Parlophone	
22 June	Come Away with Me †	Norah Jones	Parlophone	
29 June	The Very Best of George Benson: The Greatest Hits of All	George Benson	WSM	
6 July	The Very Best of George Benson: The Greatest Hits of All	George Benson	WSM	
13 July	The Very Best of George Benson: The Greatest Hits of All	George Benson	WSM	
20 July	The Very Best of George Benson: The Greatest Hits of All	George Benson	WSM	
27 July	The Very Best of George Benson: The Greatest Hits of All	George Benson	WSM	
3 August	The Very Best of George Benson: The Greatest Hits of All	George Benson	WSM	
10 August	The Very Best of George Benson: The Greatest Hits of All	George Benson	WSM	
17 August	The Very Best of George Benson: The Greatest Hits of All	George Benson	WSM	
24 August	The Very Best of George Benson: The Greatest Hits of All	George Benson	WSM	
31 August	Come Away with Me †	Norah Jones	Parlophone	
7 September	Come Away with Me †	Norah Jones	Parlophone	
14 September	Come Away with Me †	Norah Jones	Parlophone	
21 September	Come Away with Me †	Norah Jones	Parlophone	
28 September	Come Away with Me †	Norah Jones	Parlophone	
5 October	Come Away with Me †	Norah Jones	Parlophone	
12 October	Michael Bublé	Michael Bublé	Reprise	
19 October	Michael Bublé	Michael Bublé	Reprise	
26 October	As Time Goes By: The Great American Songbook, Volume II	Rod Stewart	J	
2 November	Twentysomething	Jamie Cullum	UCJ	
9 November	As Time Goes By: The Great American Songbook, Volume II	Rod Stewart	J	
16 November	As Time Goes By: The Great American Songbook, Volume II	Rod Stewart	J	
23 November	As Time Goes By: The Great American Songbook, Volume II	Rod Stewart	J	
30 November	As Time Goes By: The Great American Songbook, Volume II	Rod Stewart	J	
7 December	Twentysomething	Jamie Cullum	UCJ	
14 December	Michael Bublé	Michael Bublé	Reprise	
21 December	Michael Bublé	Michael Bublé	Reprise	
28 December	Twentysomething	Jamie Cullum	UCJ	

== See also ==
- 2003 in British music
