= When Love Comes Calling =

When Love Comes Calling may refer to:

- When Love Comes Calling (Deniece Williams album), a 1979 album
- When Love Comes Calling (George Benson album), a 1996 EP

== See also ==
- "When Love Comes Callin'", a 1990 song by Sawyer Brown
