= Walking to New Orleans =

Walking to New Orleans may refer to:

- Walking to New Orleans (song), a 1960 song by Fats Domino
- Walking to New Orleans (album), a 2019 album by George Benson
- Walking to New Orleans, a 1974 book by John Broven
