= The George Benson Collection =

Compilation album by George Benson
- Released: 1981
- Recorded: 1968–1981
- Genres: Jazz; R&B
- Length: 78:54
- Label: Warner Bros.
- Producers: Creed Taylor; Tommy LiPuma; Quincy Jones; Arif Mardin; Jay Graydon; Michael Masser

George Benson chronology
Give Me the Night (1980)	The George Benson Collection (1981)	In Your Eyes (1983)

Singles from The George Benson Collection
- 1. "Turn Your Love Around" Released: October 1981; 2. "Never Give Up on a Good Thing" Released: December 1981

The George Benson Collection is a compilation album by George Benson, released in 1981. Originally a two-LP set, it was reissued as one compact disc. In addition to previously released material from Benson's tenures with A&M Records, CTI Records, and his then-current label, Warner Bros. Records, the album features two new songs, including Benson's #1 R&B hit "Turn Your Love Around." The George Benson Collection was certified gold by the RIAA.

== Track listing ==
All tracks originally performed by Benson, except where indicated.

No.	Title	Writer(s)	Album	Length
1.	"Turn Your Love Around"	Jay Graydon; Steve Lukather; Bill Champlin	New song	3:51
2.	"Love All the Hurt Away" (with Aretha Franklin)	Sam L. Dees	Love All the Hurt Away (Aretha Franklin album)	4:10
3.	"Give Me the Night"	Rod Temperton	Give Me the Night	3:43
4.	"Cast Your Fate to the Wind" (Vince Guaraldi cover)	Vince Guaraldi; Carel Werber	Good King Bad	6:51
5.	"Never Give Up on a Good Thing"	Tom Shapiro; Michael Garvin	New song	4:06
6.	"On Broadway" (Drifters cover)	Barry Mann; Cynthia Weil; Jerry Leiber; Mike Stoller	Weekend in L.A.	5:18
7.	"White Rabbit" (Jefferson Airplane cover)	Grace Slick	White Rabbit	6:58
8.	"This Masquerade" (Leon Russell cover)	Leon Russell	Breezin'	3:19
9.	"Love Ballad" (L.T.D. cover)	Skip Scarborough	Livin' Inside Your Love	4:17
10.	"Nature Boy" (Nat "King" Cole cover)	eden ahbez	In Flight	4:20
11.	"Last Train to Clarksville" (The Monkees cover)	Tommy Boyce; Bobby Hart	Shape of Things to Come	5:01
12.	"Livin' Inside Your Love" (Earl Klugh cover)	Earl Klugh	Livin' Inside Your Love	6:38
13.	"Here Comes the Sun" (The Beatles cover)	George Harrison	The Other Side of Abbey Road	2:33
14.	"Breezin'" (Gábor Szabó cover)	Bobby Womack	Breezin'	5:39
15.	"Moody's Mood" (James Moody cover)	James Moody; Eddie Jefferson	Give Me the Night	3:26
16.	"We Got the Love" (with Chaka Khan)	George Benson	Chaka (Chaka Khan album)	3:28
17.	"The Greatest Love of All"	Michael Masser; Linda Creed	The Greatest soundtrack	5:33

NOTE: "Cast Your Fate to the Wind" was omitted from the album's CD release due to the 74-minute storage capacity of CDs at the time.

== Charts ==
=== Weekly charts ===
Chart (1981–1982)	Peak position
Canada Top Albums/CDs (RPM)	40
New Zealand Albums (RMNZ)	3
UK Albums (Official Charts)	19
US Billboard 200	14
US Top R&B/Hip-Hop Albums (Billboard)	5
Chart (1997)	Peak position
Australian (ARIA Charts)	73

=== Year-end charts ===
Chart (1982)	Position
New Zealand Albums (RMNZ)	30
US Billboard 200	71
U.S. Billboard Hot R&B/Hip-Hop Albums	30

== Certifications ==
Region	Certification	Certified units/sales
Australia (ARIA)	Gold	20,000^{^}
Japan	—	130,460
United Kingdom (BPI)	Platinum	300,000^{^}
United States (RIAA)	Gold	500,000^{^}
^{^} Shipments figures based on certification alone.
