= Irreplaceable (album) =

Studio album by George Benson
- Released: 2003 (first edition); June 8, 2004 (second edition)
- Studios: Tallest Tree Studio (West Orange, New Jersey)
- Genres: Contemporary R&B; Smooth jazz
- Length: 41:32 (first edition) 39:36 (second edition)
- Label: GRP Records
- Producers: Joshua Paul Thompson; Hakim Bell; William Irving; Joe Thomas

George Benson chronology
Absolute Benson (2000)	Irreplaceable (2003)	Givin' It Up (2006)

Singles from Irreplaceable
- 1. "Cell Phone (Blacksmith remix)" Released: 2009; 2. "Irreplaceable" Released: 2009; 3. "Softly, as in a Morning Sunrise" Released: 2010

Irreplaceable is a studio album by American musician George Benson. The album, released by GRP Records in 2003, was recorded in contemporary R&B style. However, four songs were re-recorded in a more smooth jazz style and released in 2004, together with three new songs, and leaving out three songs from the original 2003 edition.

== Critical reception ==
Professional ratings
Review scores
Source	Rating
Allmusic	3/5 stars
Tom Hull	C−

Tom Hull dismissed the album as a "dud" in his "Jazz Consumer Guide" for The Village Voice in September 2004. In a commentary published on his website, he explained, "The three instrumentals are minor groove pieces for uninspired guitar and synth beats, but at least they don't have to carry the exceptionally lame lyrics of the other seven songs. The songs come with neatly groomed layered voices. We tend to classify this sort of soul fluff as easy listening, but easy playing is more like it. It's not like anyone can actually listen."

== Track listing ==
=== First edition (2003) ===
No.	Title	Writer(s)	Length
1.	"Six Play"	Mike Clark, John Fiore, Joshua P. Thompson	4:13
2.	"Whole Man"	Hakim Bell, William Irving, Shoshyne, Hasan Smith, Joshua P. Thompson	3:52
3.	"Irreplaceable"	Mike Clark, John Fiore, Joshua P. Thompson	4:17
4.	"Loving Is Better Than Leaving"	Mike Clark, Joe Thomas, Joshua P. Thompson	4:15
5.	"Strings of Love"	John Fiore, Allan Rich, Joshua P. Thompson, Philip White	3:27
6.	"Cell Phone"	Randy Beasley, Joshua P. Thompson, Stephanie Thompson	4:12
7.	"Black Rose"	Joe Thomas, Joshua P. Thompson	4:40
8.	"Stairway to Love"	Olivia Longott, Quincy Patrick, Joshua P. Thompson	4:20
9.	"Reason for Breathing"	Scott Andrews, Quincy Patrick, Joe Thomas, Joshua P. Thompson, Warren Wilson	4:50
10.	"Missing You"	Tim Kelly, Bob Robinson, Joe Thomas, Joshua P. Thompson	3:22

=== Second edition (2004) ===
No.	Title	Writer(s)	Length
1.	"Irreplaceable"	Mike Clark, John Fiore, Joshua P. Thompson	4:17
2.	"Cell Phone" (Remix by Paul Brown & DC)	Randy Beasley, Joshua P. Thompson, Stephanie Thompson	3:44
3.	"Black Rose" (Remix by Joshua P. Thompson & John Roper)	Joe Thomas, Joshua P. Thompson	4:40
4.	"Take You Out"	Warryn Campbell, Harold Lilly, John Smith	3:54
5.	"Strings of Love"	John Fiore, Allan Rich, Joshua P. Thompson, Philip White	3:28
6.	"Missing You"	Tim Kelly, Bob Robinson, Joe Thomas, Joshua P. Thompson	3:22
7.	"Six Play" (Remix by Paul Brown & DC)	Mike Clark, John Fiore, Joshua P. Thompson	4:04
8.	"Softly, as in a Morning Sunrise"	Sigmund Romberg, Oscar Hammerstein II	3:58
9.	"Stairway To Love" (Remix by Paul Brown & DC)	Olivia Longott, Quincy Patrick, Joshua P. Thompson	3:59
10.	"Arizona Sunrise"	George Benson, Paul Brown, Thomas Klemperer	3:58

== Personnel and credits ==
Musicians

- George Benson – lead vocals, backing vocals (1–4, 6–10), electric guitar (1, 3, 7), lead guitar (2, 5, 8, 10)
- Joshua Paul Thompson – keyboards (1, 3, 5), acoustic guitar (1–3, 7, 10), bass (1, 6), drum programming (1, 3), synth bass (3), acoustic guitar solos (4), harmony guitar (5), guitars (6), strings (7)
- Joe – keyboards (4), electric guitar (4), drum programming (4), backing vocals (4, 6)
- Bill Blast – electric piano (2)
- Melvin Lee Davis – Hammond B3 organ (2)
- Bobby Douglas – keyboards (6, 7, 9)
- Georg Wadenius – rhythm electric guitar (2), electric guitar (8), guitars (9)
- Richard Bona – bass (2–10), percussion (4, 8), vocal chant (5)
- David "Pic" Conley – drum programming (1, 3, 5, 6, 8), flutes (7)
- Hakim Bell – drum programming (2)
- Ali Jackson – drum programming (7, 9, 10), live cymbals (9), live hi-hat (10)
- Mike Hobbs – finger snaps (1)
- Grégoire Maret – harmonica solo (8)
- Terry Carpenter – backing vocals (1, 3)
- Philip White – backing vocals (1, 3, 5)
- Chyna Royal – cameo lead vocals (1)
- Hasan Smith – backing vocals (2, 7)
- Randy Beasley – backing vocals (3)
- Nakiea – cameo lead vocals (3)
- Shoshannah – cameo lead vocals (4)
- Andrea Simmons – lead and backing vocals (6)
- Sean Albrecht – backing vocals (8)
- Lisa Fischer – backing vocals (8)
- Carlos Ricketts – backing vocals (9, 10)
- John Fiore – backing vocals (9)

Music arrangements

- Joshua Paul Thompson – vocal arrangements (1–8, 10)
- Philip White – vocal arrangement (1, 3, 5)
- Terry Carpenter – additional vocal arrangements (1)
- Hasan Smith – vocal arrangement (2, 7)
- Joe Thomas – vocal arrangements (4, 6)
- Richard Bona – vocal arrangements (5)
- Lisa Fischer – vocal arrangements (8)
- Carlos Ricketts – vocal arrangements (10)

Production

- Joshua Paul Thompson – producer (1, 3–10)
- Hakim Bell – producer (2)
- William Irving – producer (2)
- Joe Thomas – producer (4)
- John Roper – recording, mixing
- Tom Coyne – mastering at Sterling Sound (New York City, New York)
- Kelly Pratt – release coordinator
- Robert Silverburg – release coordinator
- Hollis King – art direction
- Rika Ichiki – design
- Donna Ramieri – photo production
- David Alan Brandt – cover photography
- Kwaku Alston – photography
- Dawn Haynes – wardrobe stylist
- Sacha Harford – grooming
- Dennis Turner and Stephanie Guervitz-Gonzalez for Turner Management Group, Inc. – management
