= Inspiration: A Tribute to Nat King Cole =

Studio album by George Benson
- Released: June 4, 2013
- Studios: The Village Studios (Los Angeles, California)
- Genre: Jazz
- Length: 40:50
- Label: Concord Jazz
- Producers: John Burk; Randy Waldman

George Benson chronology
Guitar Man (2011)	Inspiration: A Tribute to Nat King Cole (2013)	Walking to New Orleans (2019)

Singles from Inspiration: A Tribute to Nat King Cole
- 1. "Unforgettable (feat. Wynton Marsalis)" Released: 2013; 2. "When I Fall in Love (feat. Idina Menzel)" Released: 2014

Inspiration: A Tribute to Nat King Cole is a studio album by George Benson. The album was released by Concord Jazz on June 4, 2013. It peaked at #89 on the Billboard album chart.

== Critical reception ==
Professional ratings
Review scores
Source	Rating
Allmusic	4/5 stars
USA Today	4/4 stars

Inspiration: A Tribute to Nat King Cole has received very positive reception from music critics. Steve Leggett of Allmusic affirmed that "it all adds up to a sweet and very impressive album, full of warmth and heart, and it swings where it should." At USA Today, Steve Jones praised it for "his smooth vocals [that] make this homage unforgettable."

== Formats ==
- Vinyl LP
- Regular CD
- Best Buy Edition CD (incl. 2 Bonus Tracks)
- Japanese Edition CD (incl. Bonus Track)
- QVC Edition (Regular CD + 6-track Bonus Disc)
- HD Tracks (High Definition Music Downloads)
- iTunes (incl. Bonus Track)

== Track listing ==
No.	Title	Writer(s)	Length
1.	"Mona Lisa" (as Lil' Georgie Benson)		0:57
2.	"Just One of Those Things"	Cole Porter	2:42
3.	"Unforgettable"	Irving Gordon	5:05
4.	"Walkin' My Baby"	Roy Turk, Fred E. Ahlert	2:43
5.	"When I Fall in Love"	Victor Young, Edward Heyman	4:04
6.	"Route 66"	Bobby Troup	3:50
7.	"Nature Boy"	Eden Ahbez	2:40
8.	"Ballerina"	Carl Sigman, Bob Russell	2:46
9.	"Smile"	Charlie Chaplin, John Turner, Geoffrey Parsons	3:22
10.	"Straighten Up and Fly Right"	Nat King Cole, Irving Mills	3:06
11.	"Too Young"	Sidney Lippman, Sylvia Dee	3:28
12.	"I'm Gonna Sit Right Down and Write Myself a Letter"	Joe Young, Fred E. Ahlert	3:05
13.	"Mona Lisa"	Jay Livingston, Ray Evans	3:02

Best Buy bonus tracks
No.	Title	Writer(s)	Length
14.	"That Sunday, That Summer"	George David Weiss, Joe Sherman	3:02
15.	"Ramblin' Rose"	Noel Sherman, Joe Sherman	2:46

Japanese bonus track
No.	Title	Writer(s)	Length
14.	"Almost Like Being in Love"	Alan Jay Lerner, Frederick Loewe	2:15

iTunes bonus track
No.	Title	Writer(s)	Length
14.	"Mona Lisa (Calypso Version)"	Jay Livingston, Ray Evans	2:45

== Personnel ==
- George Benson – vocals, guitar
- Lil' Georgie Benson (age 8) – vocals (1), ukulele (1)
- Randy Waldman – acoustic piano, conductor, arrangements (2, 3, 6, 9, 10, 14, 15), string arrangements (4), backing vocals (10)
- Tim May – guitar
- Mike O'Neill – baritone guitar (15), banjo (15)
- Chuck Berghofer – bass
- Gregg Field – drums
- Michael Fisher – percussion
- Sheila E. – percussion (3)
- Wynton Marsalis – trumpet (3)
- Till Brönner – trumpet (9)
- Nelson Riddle – original arrangements (2, 7, 8, 11–13), horn arrangements (4)
- Idina Menzel – vocals (5)
- Alvin Chea – backing vocals (9, 10, 14, 15)
- Janey Clewer – backing vocals (9, 10, 14, 15)
- Don Shelton – backing vocals (9, 10)
- Chris Papastephanou – backing vocals (10)
- Judith Hill – vocals (11)

Henry Mancini Institute Orchestra

- Shelton Berg – dean of music
- Terence Blanchard – artistic director
- Scott Flavin – artistic coordinator
- Stephen Guerra – managing director

Brass and Woodwinds

- Cassandra Eisenreich – flute
- Neil Carson and Kevin McKeown – alto saxophone
- Derek Smith – baritone saxophone
- Mark Small and Alex Weitz – tenor saxophone
- Major Bailey, Chris Gagne, Kendall Moore and Stephen Szabadi – trombone
- Chris Burbank, Ryan Chapman, Jared Hall and Gilbert Paz – trumpet
- Jon Anderson – French horn

Strings

- Steffen Zeichner – concertmaster and violin soloist
- Rachel Hershey, Jeff Kipperman and Yen-Ling Lin – bass
- Joy Adams, Sarah Gongaware, Cecilia Huerta, Andrew Kromholz and Chia-Li Yu – cello
- Christina Hardister – harp
- Marcela Fernandez, Lauren Miller, Robyn Savitzky and Kathryn Severing – viola
- Victor Colmenares, Tomas Cotik, Adam Diderrich, Michelle Godbee, Patricia Jancova, Michelle Mlacker, Karin O'Keefe, Jonah Osawa, Rob Patrignani, Zack Piper, James Reynolds, Katrina Schaeffer, Arianne Urban, Abby Young and Steffen Zeichner – violin

== Production ==
- John Burk – producer
- Randy Waldman – co-producer
- Brian Benison – music preparation
- Junko Tamura – music preparation
- Mary Hogan – A&R administration
- Larissa Collins – creative director
- Greg Allan for Omnivore Creative – art direction, design, photography
- Monica Schweiger – stylist
- Rachel Hoke – hair, make-up
- George Benson – liner notes
- Stephanie Gonzalez for Apropos Management & Marketing – artist representative

Technical credits

- Paul Blakemore – mastering at CMG Mastering (Cleveland, Ohio)
- Seth Presant – recording, mixing
- Al Schmitt – recording, mixing
- Shinnosuke Miyazawa – assistant recording engineer
- Chris Owens – assistant recording engineer
- Randy Waldman – additional piano recording at Randini Studio (Studio City, California)
- Jeff Jones – trumpet recording (3)
- Dave Polar – orchestra recording at The Hit Factory Criteria (Miami, Florida)
- Chad Jolly – assistant orchestra engineer

== Release history ==
List of release dates, showing country, record label, and format
Region	Date	Label	Format
Germany	May 31, 2013	Concord	CD, Digital download
United Kingdom	June 3, 2013	Concord	CD, Digital download
France	June 3, 2013	Concord	CD, Digital download
United States	June 4, 2013	Concord	CD, Digital download
Japan	June 5, 2013	Concord	CD, Digital download
Germany	June 14, 2013	Concord	LP record
United Kingdom	June 17, 2013	Concord	LP record
United States	June 25, 2013	Concord	LP record
Japan	June 25, 2013	Concord	LP record
