= Teaser (George Benson song) =

Single by George Benson

from the album While the City Sleeps...
- Released: 1987
- Recorded: 1985
- Genre: R&B
- Label: Warner Bros.
- Songwriter(s): Jeff Cohen; David Jenkins; Cory Lerios; Narada Michael Walden

George Benson singles chronology
"Shiver" (1986)	"Teaser" (1987)	"Since You're Gone" (1987)

"Teaser" is a single by American R&B singer George Benson, which entered the UK Singles Chart on 14 February 1987. It reached a peak position of number 45, and remained on the chart for 4 weeks.

== Critical reception ==
Wayne Hussey of Smash Hits panned "Teaser" he described as "crap".

== Personnel ==
- George Benson - lead guitar & lead vocals
- Walter Afanasieff - keyboards
- David Jenkins - rhythm guitar, background vocals
- Cory Lerios - keyboards & bass sequencing
- Sterling - synth horns
- Narada Michael Walden - arrangements, drums
- Bud Cockrell, Jennifer Hall, Carolyn Hedrich - background vocals
