= That's Right (album) =

Studio album by George Benson
- Released: July 30, 1996
- Studios: Paisley Park (Chanhassen, Minnesota); Soundtrack Studios, Greene St. Recording and Broadway Recording Studios (New York City, New York); Schnee Studios (North Hollywood, California); Whitfield Street Studios (London, UK)
- Genres: Jazz; funk; soul
- Length: 49:45
- Label: GRP
- Producers: Tommy LiPuma; Ricky Peterson; Joe Mardin; Jean-Paul 'Bluey' Maunick; Robbie Buchanan

George Benson chronology
Love Remembers (1993)	That's Right (1996)	Standing Together (1998)

Singles from That's Right
- 1. "Holdin' On" Released: 1997; 2. "Summer Love" Released: 1997; 3. "Song for My Brother (Masters at Work Mix)" Released: 1997

That's Right is a studio album by American musician George Benson. It was released through GRP Records on July 30, 1996. That's Right was Benson's first album released with the label after twenty years on Warner Bros. Records and produced by longtime producer, Tommy LiPuma. The cover photograph is by Andy Earl and captures Benson in Burnaby Street, Chelsea, London.

== Critical reception ==
Professional ratings
Review scores
Source	Rating
AllMusic	2.5/5 stars

AllMusic editor Thom Owens wrote that "like his other '90s albums, That's Right is jazz-inflected quiet-storm soul. It's quietly funky and always grooving, whether he's playing a light uptempo number or a silky ballad. As always, Benson's tone is smooth and supple – it's a pleasure to hear him play, even if the material he has selected doesn't always showcase his ample skills. In fact, the unevenness in material is the very thing that keeps That's Right from being on par with Benson's early '80s contemporary soul records."

== Track listing ==
1. "That's Right" (Michael White, Ron Smith) - 5:02
2. "The Thinker" (Bob Ward, Gary Haase) - 5:37
3. "Marvin Said" (George Benson) - 5:20
4. "True Blue" (Adam Falcon, Trevor Gale) - 5:06
5. "Holdin' On" (Gary Brown) - 5:32
6. "Song for My Brother" (Paul Peterson) - 4:16
7. "Johnnie Lee" (George Benson) - 5:37
8. "Summer Love" (Curtis Williams, Gary Brown) - 4:37
9. "P Park" (George Benson, Ricky Peterson) - 4:50
10. "Footprints in the Sand" (Gary Brown) - 3:45

UK and Japanese bonus tracks

1. "When Love Comes Calling" (Jean-Paul Maunick, Max Beesley) - 6:39
2. "Where Are You Now?" (Damon Banks, Gary Brown, Tom Keane) - 5:38

== Personnel and credits ==
Musicians

- George Benson – lead guitar (1–5, 7, 9, 10), vocals (3, 10, 12), lead vocals (5, 8, 11), guitar (6, 8, 11, 12)
- Ricky Peterson – keyboards (1–4, 6, 7, 9), organ (1–4, 7, 9), drum programming (1–4, 7, 9), wah guitar synth (5), additional electric piano (8), electric piano (12), additional keyboard (12)
- Joe Mardin – keyboards (5, 8, 12), programming (5, 8, 12), live drum loop and fills (8), electric piano (12), synth bass (12)
- Curtis Williams – additional keyboards (8)
- Robbie Buchanan – keyboard programming (10)
- Max Beesley – keyboards (11), acoustic piano (11), vibraphone (11)
- Graham Harvey – acoustic piano (11)
- Tom Keane – electric piano (12), synth bass (12)
- Paul Peterson – rhythm guitar (1–4, 6, 7, 9), bass (1–4, 6, 7, 9), keyboards (6)
- Julian Crampton – bass (11)
- Michael Bland – drums (1–4, 6, 7, 9), additional drums (5, 12)
- Richard Bull – drum and percussion programming (11)
- Jean-Paul 'Bluey' Maunick – drum programming (11)
- Ralph MacDonald – congas (3)
- Paulinho da Costa – cowbell (6)
- Eric Leeds – saxophone (9)
- Bud Beadle – alto saxophone (11), flute (11)
- Fayyaz Virji – trombone (11)
- Kevin Robinson – trumpet (11), flugelhorn (11)
- Nikki Richards – additional backing vocals (8)
- Mark Anthoni – backing vocals (11)
- Joy Malcolm – backing vocals (11)

Music arrangements

- Ricky Peterson – arrangements (1–4, 6, 7, 9), string arrangements (1, 3, 4, 6, 7, 9)
- John Clayton – string arrangements (1, 3, 4, 7)
- Gary Brown – arrangements (5), BGV arrangements (5, 8), vocal arrangements (12)
- Joe Mardin – arrangements (5, 8, 12)
- Paul Peterson – arrangements (6)
- Curtis Williams – arrangements (8)
- Robbie Buchanan – keyboard arrangements (10), music arrangements (10, 11)
- Simon Hale – string arrangements (10, 11)
- Fayyaz Virji – horn arrangements (11)

Production

- Tommy LiPuma – executive producer, producer (1–4, 6, 7, 9)
- Ricky Peterson – producer (1–4, 6, 7, 9)
- Joe Mardin – producer (5, 8, 12)
- Jean-Paul Maunick – producer (10, 11)
- Robbie Buchanan – additional production (10, 11)
- Tulani Bridgewater – production coordinator
- Gary Brown – production coordinator
- Wayne Cullinan – production coordinator
- Jim Hoskins – production coordinator
- George Kennedy – production coordinator
- Julie Knapp – production coordinator
- Laurie Goldman – graphic design
- Robin Lynch – graphic design, art direction
- Andy Earl – photography
- Fritz/Byers Management – management

Technical credits

- Arnie Acosta – mastering
- Gavin Lurssen – mastering
- Doug Sax – mastering
- The Mastering Lab (Hollywood, California) – mastering location
- Tom Tucker – recording engineer (1–4, 6, 7, 9), engineer (5, 8, 12)
- Bill Schnee – mixing (1–4, 6, 7, 9–11), string recording (1, 3, 4, 6, 7, 9), additional recording (1–4, 6, 7, 9)
- Rod Hui – engineer (5, 8, 12), mixing (5, 8, 12)
- Joe Mardin – mixing (5, 8, 12)
- Simon Cotsworth – recording (10, 11), additional mixes (10, 11)
- John Gallen – recording (10, 11), additional mixes (10, 11)
- Fred Harrington – second engineer (1–4, 6, 7, 9)
- John Hendrickson – second engineer (1–4, 6, 7, 9)
- Shane T. Keller – second engineer (1–4, 6, 7, 9), assistant engineer (5, 8, 12)
- Jackeline Acosta – assistant engineer (5, 8, 12)
- Ben Arrindell – assistant engineer (5, 8, 12)
- Evan Benjamin – assistant engineer (5, 8, 12)
- Mikael Ifversen – assistant engineer (5, 8, 12)
- Brian Kinkead – assistant engineer (5, 8, 12)
- Danny Madorsky – assistant engineer (5, 8, 12)
- Eric Tew – assistant engineer (5, 8, 12)
- Paul Attridge – assistant engineer (10, 11)
- Jake Davies – assistant engineer (10, 11)
- Grippa Laybourne – assistant engineer (10, 11)

== Charts ==
Chart (1997)	Peak position
Australia (ARIA)	93
UK Albums (Official Charts)	61
US Top Jazz Albums (Billboard)	1
US Top R&B/Hip-Hop Albums (Billboard)	33
US Billboard 200	150
