= Absolute Benson =

Studio album by George Benson
- Released: May 23, 2000
- Studios: Clinton Recording Studios, The Power Station, Sound On Sound and Platinum Audio (New York City, New York); Schnee Studios (North Hollywood, California); Master Mix Studios (Minneapolis, Minnesota)
- Genres: Smooth jazz; Latin jazz
- Length: 48:36
- Labels: GRP; Verve
- Producers: Tommy LiPuma; "Little" Louie Vega; Kenny "Dope" Gonzalez

George Benson chronology
Standing Together (1998)	Absolute Benson (2000)	Irreplaceable (2003)

Singles from Standing Together
- 1. "The Ghetto" Released: 2000

Absolute Benson is an enhanced studio album by American jazz musician George Benson. It was released by GRP and Verve Records on May 23, 2000, in the United States. Taking a tip from 1999's pop-man-of-the-year Carlos Santana, Benson goes Latin on this release.

== Critical reception ==
Professional ratings
Review scores
Source	Rating
AllMusic	4/5 stars

AllMusic editor William Ruhlmann that Absolute Benson "is another in a series of consistently excellent CDs that characterize it [...] If it is difficult to crossover from jazz to pop, crossing back can be just as treacherous. Benson's oldest fans, who later became his detractors, still may not be satisfied with his current approach, but it has deservedly won him a secure place in contemporary jazz."

== Track listing ==
No.	Title	Writer(s)	Length
1.	"The Ghetto"	Al Eaton, Donny Hathaway; Leroy Hutson; Todd Shaw	4:56
2.	"El Barrio"	George Benson; Kenny Gonzalez; Louie Vega	3:34
3.	"Jazzenco"	Marc Antoine	5:48
4.	"Deeper Than You Think"	Joe Sample	5:55
5.	"One on One"	Joe Sample	7:05
6.	"Hipping the Hop"	Joe Sample	3:57
7.	"Lately"	Marvin Sease; Stevie Wonder	4:22
8.	"Come Back Baby"	Ray Charles; Aretha Franklin	5:59
9.	"Medicine Man"	George Benson; Joe Sample	7:00

== Personnel and credits ==
Musicians

- George Benson – guitar, vocals (1, 2, 8)
- Joe Sample – Hammond B3 organ (1, 2), Wurlitzer electric piano (1, 2), synthesizers (1, 2), acoustic piano (3–9)
- Ricky Peterson – Hammond B3 organ (8), synthesizers (8)
- Carlos Henriquez – bass (1, 2)
- Christian McBride – bass (3–9)
- Vidal Davis – drums (1, 2)
- Steve Gadd – drums (3–5, 7, 8)
- Cindy Blackman – drums (6, 9)
- Luisito Quintero – percussion (1, 2)
- Luis Conte – congas (3–6, 9), percussion (3–6, 9), timbales (3–6, 9)
- Claudia Acuña – backing vocals (1, 2)
- Roy Ayers – backing vocals (1)
- Lisa Fischer – backing vocals (1, 2)
- La India – backing vocals (1, 2)
- Richard Shade – backing vocals (1)

Music arrangements

- Ricky Peterson – synthesizer arrangements
- Joe Sample – synthesizer arrangements
- Arif Mardin – string arrangements (7)

Production

- Tommy LiPuma – producer (1, 3–9)
- "Little" Louie Vega – producer (2)
- Kenny "Dope" Gonzalez – producer (2)
- Stuart Pressman – release coordinator
- Robert Silverberg – release coordinator
- Hollis King – art direction
- Isabelle Wong – graphic design
- Kwaku Alston – photography
- Jeffrey Scales – photography
- Dennis Turner and Stephanie Guervitz for Turner Management Group, Inc. – management

Technical credits

- Doug Sax – mastering at The Mastering Lab (Hollywood, California)
- Steven Barkan – recording (1, 2), mixing (1, 2)
- Jon Fausty – recording (1, 2)
- Al Schmitt – recording (3–9), overdub recording (3–9), additional recording (3–9)
- Bill Schnee – mixing (3–9), overdub recording (3–9)
- Elliot Scheiner – overdub recording (3–9), additional recording (3–9)
- Tommy Tucker Jr. – overdub recording (3–9)
- James Farber – string recording (7)
- Kayo Teramoto – assistant mix engineer (1, 2)
- Koji Egawa – assistant mix engineer (3–9)
- Mark Fraunfelder – assistant engineer (3–9)
- Alan Moon – assistant engineer (3–9)
- Aya Takemura – assistant engineer (3–9)

== Charts ==
Chart (2000)	Peak position
UK Albums (Official Charts)	77
US Top Jazz Albums (Billboard)	1
US Top R&B/Hip-Hop Albums (Billboard)	24
US Billboard 200	125
