= When Love Comes Calling (George Benson album) =

EP by George Benson
- Released: 1996
- Recorded: 1996
- Genre: Smooth jazz
- Length: 21:09 (12"); 15:17 (CD)
- Label: GRP Records
- Producer: Jean-Paul 'Bluey' Maunick, Ricky Peterson, Tommy LiPuma

George Benson chronology
Kiss And Make Up (1993)	When Love Comes Calling (1996)	You Can Do It (Baby) (1996)

When Love Comes Calling is an EP by the American jazz/soul guitarist George Benson. It was released on 12" vinyl and CD in 1996 through GRP Records in Europe. 12" vinyl edition contains three songs from the album "That's Right" and the radio edit of "When Love Comes Calling". CD edition contains two songs from the album "That's Right" and an edited version of "When Love Comes Calling".

== 12" vinyl track listing ==
No.	Title	Writer(s)	Length
1.	"When Love Comes Calling (Radio Edit)"	Jean-Paul 'Bluey' Maunick, Max Beesley	4:05
2.	"When Love Comes Calling (Album Version)"	Jean-Paul 'Bluey' Maunick, Max Beesley	6:27
3.	"That's Right (Album Version)"	Michael White, Ron Smith	5:00
4.	"The Thinker (Album Version)"	Bob Ward, Gary Haase	5:37

== CD track listing ==
No.	Title	Writer(s)	Length
1.	"When Love Comes Calling (Edited Version)"	Jean-Paul 'Bluey' Maunick, Max Beesley	4:05
2.	"True Blue"	Adam Falcon, Trevor Gale	5:05
3.	"When Love Comes Calling (Album Version)"	Jean-Paul 'Bluey' Maunick, Max Beesley	6:07

== Personnel ==
=== When Love Comes Calling (Radio Edit) & (Album Version) ===
- George Benson – lead vocals & guitar
- Simon Hale – string arrangement
- Maxton Gig Beesley Jr. – keyboards, piano & vibes
- Graham Harvey – acoustic piano
- Julian Crampton – bass
- Richard Bull – drum & percussion programming
- J.P. 'Bluey' Maunick – drum programming
- Frayaz Virji – trombone & horn arrangement
- Kevin Robinson – trumpet & flugel horn
- Bud Beadle – alto saxophone & flute
- Joy Malcolm – background vocals
- Mark Anthoni – background vocals

=== That's Right (Album Version) ===
- George Benson – lead guitar
- Ricky Peterson – drum programming & arrangement
- John Clayton, Ricky Peterson – string arrangement
- Paul Peterson – bass & rhythm guitar
- Michael Bland – drums
- Ricky Peterson – keyboards & organ

=== The Thinker (Album Version) ===
- George Benson – lead guitar
- Ricky Peterson – drum programming & arrangement
- Paul Peterson – bass & rhythm guitar
- Michael Bland – drums
- Ricky Peterson – keyboards & organ

=== True Blue ===
- George Benson – lead guitar
- Ricky Peterson – drum programming & arrangement
- Jonh Clayton, Ricky Peterson – string arrangement
- Paul Peterson – bass & rhythm guitar
- Michael Bland – drums
- Ricky Peterson – keyboards & organ

== Producers ==
- Jean-Paul 'Bluey' Maunick (tracks: 1, 2),
- Ricky Peterson (tracks: 3, 4),
- Tommy LiPuma (tracks: 3, 4).
