= Walking to New Orleans (album) =

Studio album by George Benson
- Released: 26 April 2019
- Studios: Ocean Way Nashville (Nashville, Tennessee); Brick Road Studios (Scottsdale, Arizona); The Cave (Malibu, California); Kensington Sound (Toronto, Ontario, Canada); The Cave (Sydney, Australia)
- Genre: Jazz
- Length: 37:26
- Label: Provogue
- Producer: Kevin Shirley

George Benson chronology
Inspiration: A Tribute to Nat King Cole (2013)	Walking to New Orleans (2019)

Walking to New Orleans is a studio album by American guitarist and singer George Benson, released by Provogue Records on 26 April 2019. It is Benson's first recording since Inspiration: A Tribute to Nat King Cole, which was released in 2013.

== Background ==
Benson made this album as a tribute to Fats Domino and Chuck Berry. In an interview, Benson said: ″I'm a great appreciator of the music made by both of those guys″; ″Chuck Berry was a great showman and a great musician, and Fats Domino cut nothing but hit after hit after hit″.

== Critical reception ==
Professional ratings
Review scores
Source	Rating
Jazzwise	3/5 stars
Allmusic	3.5/5 stars

Peter Quinn of Jazzwise remarked "On his 45th album, George Benson pays tribute to two of his musical heroes, the godfather of rock'n'roll, Chuck Berry, and another rock'n'roll icon and hit machine, Fats Domino." Matt Collar of Allmusic noted "Where Inspiration was a lushly swinging standards album, Walking to New Orleans is all blues grit and old-school R&B swagger."

== Track listing ==
No.	Title	Writer(s)	Length
1.	"Nadine (Is It You)"	Chuck Berry	3:53
2.	"Ain't That a Shame"	Fats Domino, Dave Bartholomew	3:49
3.	"Rockin' Chair"	Fats Domino, Alvin E. Young	3:39
4.	"You Can't Catch Me"	Chuck Berry	3:35
5.	"Havana Moon"	Chuck Berry	4:54
6.	"I Hear You Knocking"	Dave Bartholomew	3:45
7.	"Memphis, Tennessee"	Chuck Berry	3:19
8.	"Walking to New Orleans"	Bobby Charles, Fats Domino, Dave Bartholomew	4:08
9.	"Blue Monday"	Dave Bartholomew	3:03
10.	"How You've Changed"	Chuck Berry	3:21

== Personnel ==
- George Benson – vocals, guitar
- Kevin McKendree – acoustic piano
- Rob McNelley – rhythm guitar
- Alison Prestwood – bass guitar
- Greg Morrow – drums, percussion
- Paulie Cerra – saxophone, baritone saxophone
- Ron Dziubla – baritone saxophone, sax solos
- Lee Thornburg – trumpet, horn arrangements
- Jeff Bova – orchestral arrangements
- The Bovaland Symphonic Orchestra – orchestra
- Mahalia Barnes – backing vocals
- Prinnie Stevens – backing vocals
- Natasha Stuart – backing vocals

== Production ==
- George Benson – executive producer
- Kevin Shirley – producer
- Roy Koch – artwork
- Austin Hargrave – photography
- Stephanie Gonzalez for Apropos Management – management

Technical credits

- Bob Ludwig – mastering at Gateway Mastering (Portland, Maine)
- Kevin Shirley – mixing, BGV engineer, horn engineer
- Austin Atwood – tracking engineer
- Mark DeCozio – additional vocal engineer
- Vezi Tayyeb – horn engineer

== Release history ==
Region	Date	Format	Label
United States	26 April 2019	CD; digital download; LP record	Provogue
