= The Greatest Love of All =

Popular song by Michael Masser and Linda Creed

Single by George Benson

from the album The Greatest soundtrack
- B-side: "Ali's Theme"
- Released: June 1977
- Recorded: 1977
- Genre: Smooth jazz; R&B; soul
- Length: 5:32 (full album version); 3:29 (edited single version)
- Label: Arista
- Composer: Michael Masser
- Lyricist: Linda Creed
- Producer: Michael Masser

George Benson singles chronology
"Gonna Love You More" (1977)	"The Greatest Love of All" (1977)	"On Broadway" (1978)

"The Greatest Love of All" is a song written by Linda Creed and Michael Masser. Creed wrote the lyrics and Masser composed the music. It was originally recorded in 1977 by George Benson, who made the song a substantial hit, peaking at number two on the US Hot Soul Singles chart that year, the first R&B chart top-ten hit for Arista Records. The song was written and recorded to be the main theme of the 1977 film The Greatest, a biopic of the boxer Muhammad Ali, and is performed during the opening credits.

Benson's original recording was released in 1977 in the United States, Japan, France, Germany, New Zealand, Australia, Italy, Brazil, Netherlands, the United Kingdom and Thailand, on an extended play (EP). He officially recorded the song four times; in addition to the studio single, Benson also recorded three live versions, the last time in a duet with Luciano Pavarotti in 2001. Since 1977, a great number of artists have recorded this song, including Shirley Bassey, Oleta Adams, Alexandra Burke, Deborah Cox, Ferrante & Teicher and Kevin Rowland.

Eight years after Benson's original recording, the song became even more well known when Whitney Houston's 1985 cover (with the slightly truncated title "Greatest Love of All") eventually topped the charts, peaking at number one in the United States, Australia, Canada and on the US R&B chart in early 1986.

== Background and composition ==
The song's music was composed by Michael Masser, and its lyrics were written by Linda Creed, in 1976 for The Greatest. According to the Los Angeles Times, after he had been asked to write the song for the movie, Masser felt drawn to Jerusalem, even though he was not a religious man, "to get the feelings—not just my own." Masser also told the Los Angeles Times his special feelings about Ali:

Here was a man who wanted to change his name and religion. That's all. Ali hadn't believed in the war in Vietnam and had refused to fight in it. He won that battle through the legal system. Still, he lost everything—including his title. But Ali retained the most important thing of all—his dignity.

In an interview with the Ocala Star-Banner in 1988, similarly, Masser said that "He (Ali) represented to me a tremendous athlete who suffered prejudice from the white man's world. He didn't give up what he believed even though he lost his title." Masser also told the Los Angeles Times that the song had another personal meaning for him to give up a legal career to pursue his interest in music, adding, "People thought I was crazy. I had to starve. Had no money. Marriage broke up. But I had to do what I'd wanted to do since I was 6... write music." Upon his return from Jerusalem, he contracted with lyricist Creed to work on the song and wrote it right from the heart, with Creed drawing inspiration from her family. Then Masser had George Benson perform the song for the soundtrack. He said, "The record came out and the song became an underground theme for black people."

Benson recorded "The Greatest Love of All" for the soundtrack album of The Greatest. The song was released as a single in the same year and was a substantial hit, reaching number 2 on the Billboard R&B chart, the first R&B Top Ten hit for Arista Records, and ended the year at position 33. The single also reached positions number 3 on the Cash Box Top 100 R&B and number 4 on the Record World R&B Singles. In other charts, the single was between positions number 22 and number 29 in the US, number 27 in the UK, and number 25 and 42 in Canada. "The Greatest Love of All" is one of George Benson's most successful hits, and for this reason was included in two of his many collections, The Greatest Hits of All and The Very Best of George Benson: The Greatest Hits of All.

== Charts ==
=== Weekly charts ===
Chart (1977)	Peak position
Australia (Kent Music Report)	94
Canada Adult Contemporary (RPM)	42
Canada Top Singles (RPM)	25
UK Singles (Official Charts)	27
US Adult Contemporary (Billboard)	22
US Billboard Hot 100	24
US R&B Chart (Billboard)	2
US Cash Box Top 100	29
US Top 100 R&B (Cash Box)	3
US Singles Chart (Record World)	27
US R&B Singles (Record World)	4

=== Year-end charts ===
Chart (1977)	Position
Canada Top 200 Singles of 1977 (RPM)	173
US Soul Singles (Billboard)	33
US Top R&B Singles (Cash Box)	41
US R&B Solo Artist (Record World)	10

== Whitney Houston version ==
"Greatest Love of All"

Single by Whitney Houston

from the album Whitney Houston
- B-side: "Thinking About You"
- Released: March 18, 1986
- Recorded: December 1984
- Genre: R&B; soul; pop
- Length: 4:51 (album version); 4:56 (deluxe version)
- Label: Arista
- Composer: Michael Masser
- Lyricist: Linda Creed
- Producer: Michael Masser

Whitney Houston singles chronology
"How Will I Know" (1985)	"Greatest Love of All" (1986)	"I Wanna Dance with Somebody (Who Loves Me)" (1987)

Music video
- "Greatest Love of All" on YouTube

The song was further popularized by American singer Whitney Houston under the title "Greatest Love of All", without the definite article "The". The song was recorded in December 1984 for her 1985 self-titled debut studio album. The song became a major hit, topping the charts in Australia, Canada and the US, while reaching the top 20 in most countries, including Italy, Sweden and the UK. It remains her third biggest US hit, after "I Will Always Love You" and "I Wanna Dance with Somebody (Who Loves Me)". The three songs re-entered the Billboard Hot 100 chart after Houston's death in 2012, in order of their former popularity, debuting the same week at numbers 7, 35 and 41, respectively, giving Houston three posthumous chart hits.

Clive Davis, founder of Houston's label Arista Records, was initially against Houston recording the song for her debut studio album, Whitney Houston, but he eventually gave in after persuasion from Houston and Masser. It was released as the B-side to the single "You Give Good Love", a previous Top 5 hit by Houston. The song, eventually released as a single in its own right on March 18, 1986, was the seventh release from Houston's debut album, and eventually topped the Billboard Hot 100 for the week of May 17, 1986. It would spend three cumulative weeks atop the chart. It spent 14 weeks inside the top 40, including seven weeks in the top ten, spending an initial 18 weeks on the charts. Upon its return to the charts in the aftermath of Houston's death, the song reentered the Hot 100 on February 25 and charted for an additional second week on March 3 at numbers 41 and 36 respectively, eventually accumulating 20 weeks including 15 weeks in the top 40. The single cemented Houston's status as a global pop star.

Her live performance in 1990 in the 15th anniversary of Arista Records concert in Radio City Music Hall was included in the 25th anniversary deluxe edition of Whitney Houston and the 2014 CD/DVD release, Whitney Houston Live: Her Greatest Performances.

=== Background ===
Masser said, "When I first met Whitney in 1981–82, she was about 19 or 20 and unknown. I went into Sweetwater's, and I thought I must be totally out of it—I said, 'I must be going crazy, I think I'm hearing one of my songs.' She was singing 'The Greatest Love of All' just as I walked in, and that meant something to me. Two and a half years later when I was doing Teddy Pendergrass there was a duet and everybody wanted me to use this or that known person. Only because I had heard Whitney singing 'The Greatest Love of All'. I chose her."

=== Music video ===
Houston's music video was filmed at Harlem's Apollo Theater in New York City. In the video, she is a successful singer who is about to perform in front of an audience. She reminisces about the time when she was a child performing in a talent competition and receiving encouragement from her mother. The video features Houston's mother Cissy Houston playing herself, supporting a young Houston, as well as hugging present Houston at the end of the video. It was directed by Peter Israelson, filmed with James Contner as DP and Steadicam operator Robin Buerki shooting 35mm film. In February 2020, the music video was restored in 4K.

=== Reception ===
==== Critical reception ====
Many critics called the song the centerpiece of Houston's debut album. Stephen Holden of The New York Times wrote that "Houston sings it with a forceful directness that gives its message of self-worth an astounding resonance and conviction" and called the song a compelling assertion of spiritual devotion, black pride, and family loyalty, all at once. Don Shewey of Rolling Stone wrote that as the song builds, Houston "slowly pours on the soul, slips in some churchy phrasing, holds notes a little longer and shows off her glorious voice."

==== Chart performance ====
Benson's 1977 version was an R&B hit, reaching number 2 on the R&B chart. It was a moderate pop hit, making the top 40 on the Billboard Hot 100. Houston's version reached number one on the Hot 100 chart for three weeks in 1986. The single was the fourth hit (and third number 1) from her debut album; she became the first female artist to score three number ones from one album.

To date, this song was her second longest stay atop this chart, behind 1992's "I Will Always Love You". The song also reached number one on both component charts, the Hot 100 Singles Sales and the Hot 100 Airplay, her second consecutive release to do so, and stayed for 14 weeks inside the top 40. On other Billboard charts, Houston also performed well, reaching number three on the R&B chart. The song topped the adult contemporary chart for five weeks, Houston's longest stay at the top of that chart at the time. The song ranked No. 11 on Billboard's year end pop singles chart.

After her death, the single returned to the Billboard Hot 100, debuting at number 41; the next week it re-entered the top 40 at number 36, earning a 15th week inside the top 40.

==== Usage in media ====
Houston's version of the song was featured in the first season of RuPaul's Drag Race, being performed by contestants Akashia and Shannel in a "lipsync for your life".

==== Accolades ====
Houston won the American Music Award for Favorite Soul/R&B Video Single, and was nominated for a Grammy Award for Record of the Year and a Soul Train Music Award for Single of the Year.

=== Track listings ===
- US 7-inch vinyl single

A: "Greatest Love of All" – 4:51
B: "Thinking About You" – 4:06

- UK 12-inch vinyl maxi single

A1: "Greatest Love of All" – 4:49
B1: "Thinking About You" – 4:03
B2: "Shock Me" (duet with Jermaine Jackson) – 5:05

- Spain 12-inch vinyl maxi single

A1: "Greatest Love of All" – 4:49
B1: "Someone for Me" – 4:58
B2: "Thinking About You" – 4:07

- Japanese CD single
1. "Greatest Love of All" – 4:51
2. "Thinking About You" – 4:03

=== Charts ===
==== Weekly charts ====
Chart (1986–1987)	Peak position
Australia (Kent Music Report)	1
Austria (Ö3 Austria Top 40)	25
Belgium (Ultratop 50 Flanders)	31
Canada Adult Contemporary (RPM)	1
Canada Top Singles (RPM)	1
Canada Retail Singles (The Record)	3
Europe (European Hot 100 Singles)	11
Finland (Suomen virallinen lista)	16
Iceland (RÚV)	4
Ireland (IRMA)	1
Luxembourg (Radio Luxembourg)	9
Netherlands (Dutch Top 40)	17
Netherlands (Single Top 100)	24
New Zealand (Recorded Music NZ)	12
Panama (UPI)	1
Quebec (ADISQ)	1
Sweden (Sverigetopplistan)	14
Switzerland (Schweizer Hitparade)	20
UK Singles (Official Charts)	8
US Billboard Hot 100	1
US Adult Contemporary (Billboard)	1
US Hot R&B/Hip-Hop Songs (Billboard)	3
West Germany (GfK)	30

Chart (2012)	Peak position
Australia (ARIA)	56
Canada Digital Song Sales (Billboard)	39
France (SNEP)	70
Japan Hot 100 (Billboard)	34
Netherlands (Single Top 100)	28
New Zealand (Recorded Music NZ)	40
South Korea International (Circle)	26
Spain (Promusicae)	39
Switzerland (Schweizer Hitparade)	55
UK Singles (Official Charts)	58
US Billboard Hot 100	36

Chart (2026)	Peak position
Jamaica Airplay (JAMMS)	4

==== Year-end charts ====
Chart (1986)	Position
Australia (Kent Music Report)	27
Canada Top Singles (RPM)	20
UK Singles (OCC)	96
US Top Pop Singles (Billboard)	11
US Top Adult Contemporary Singles (Billboard)	7
US Top Black Singles (Billboard)	46

=== Certifications ===
Region	Certification	Certified units/sales
Canada (Music Canada)	Platinum	80,000^{‡}
New Zealand (RMNZ)	Gold	15,000^{‡}
United Kingdom (BPI)	Platinum	600,000^{‡}
United States (RIAA)	2× Platinum	2,000,000^{‡}
^{‡} Sales+streaming figures based on certification alone.

== Other versions ==
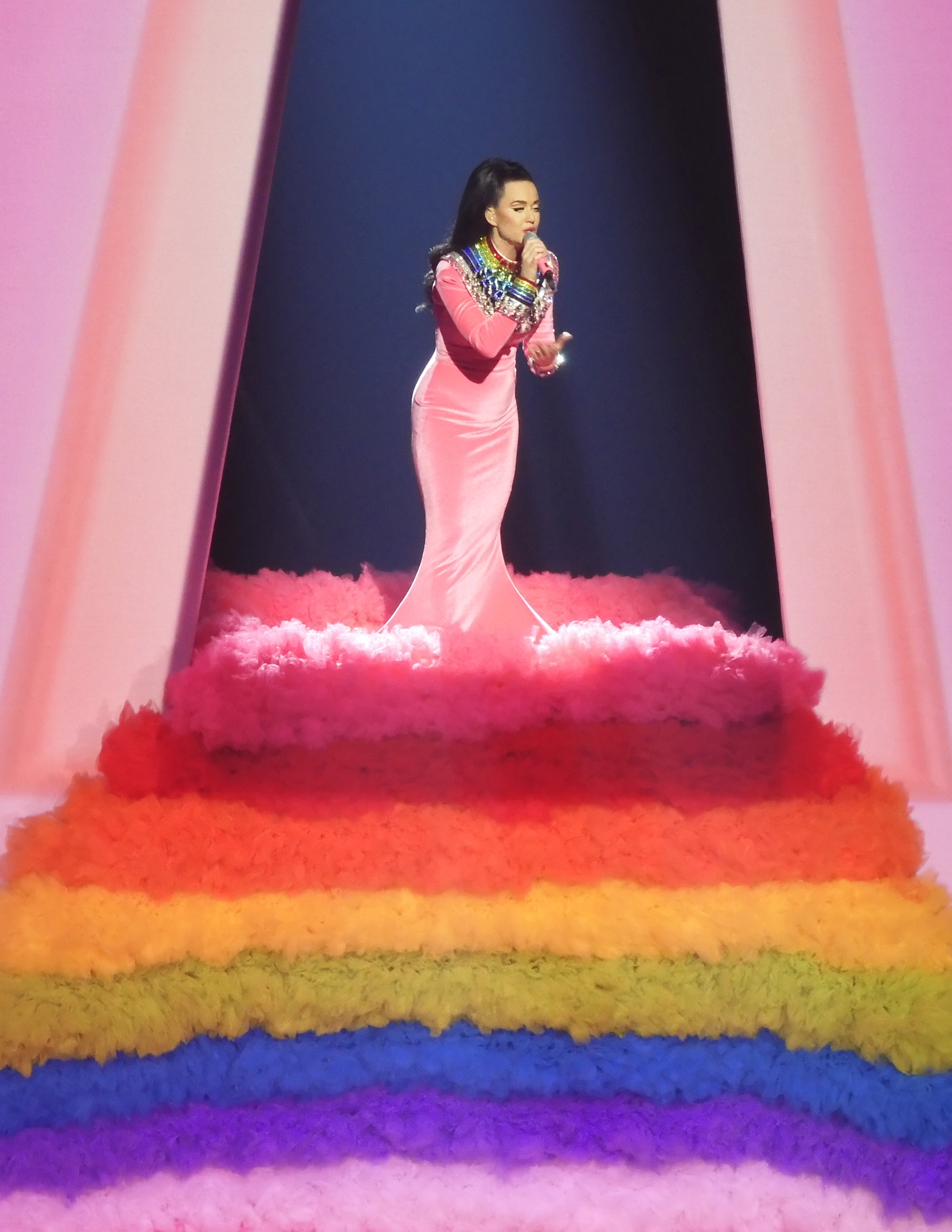
Katy Perry performing "The Greatest Love of All" at the Play

A number of other artists have covered this song, including Shirley Bassey, Oleta Adams, Alexandra Burke, Deborah Cox, Lea Salonga, Ferrante & Teicher, Kevin Rowland and Jane Olivor.

On May 29, 2001, the Italian operatic tenor Luciano Pavarotti performed the concert "Pavarotti & Friends" in his hometown of Modena, Italy. Intended to raise money for refugees from Afghanistan under the United Nations High Commissioner for Refugees, this concert was called "Pavarotti & Friends for Afghanistan" and featured various guest artists, one of them being his friend George Benson. The song performed in duet by the two was Benson's song "The Greatest Love of All", sung in parts by Benson in English and elsewhere by Pavarotti in Italian. This complete concert "Pavarotti & Friends for Afghanistan" raised $3.3 million for its cause, and was recorded and released in CD in 2001. The song was credited with the original title "The Greatest Love of All" recorded by Benson.

A performance of "The Greatest Love of All" is a major plot point in the 2016 German comedy-drama Toni Erdmann, where the song is sung by Sandra Hüller.

NBC footage of the final night in Jonestown (November 17, 1978) shows the Peoples Temple settlers singing “The Greatest Love of All”, led by members of the "Jonestown Express" band. The next day, almost everyone in the video would be dead, either by poison or being shot on the orders of Jim Jones.

== Copyright infringement lawsuit and settlement ==
In April 1987, Gordon Lightfoot filed a lawsuit against Michael Masser, alleging that Masser's song "The Greatest Love of All" stole twenty-four bars from Lightfoot's 1970 hit "If You Could Read My Mind". According to Maclean's, Lightfoot commented, "It really rubbed me the wrong way. I don't want the present-day generation to think that I stole my song from him." Lightfoot has stated that he dropped the suit when he felt it was having a negative effect on Houston, as the suit was about Masser and not her. Ultimately the case was settled out of court and Masser issued a public apology.
