= Standing Together (George Benson album) =

Studio album by George Benson
- Released: June 2, 1998
- Studios: The Record Plant and Westlake Audio (Los Angeles, California); Alpha Studios and The Enterprise (Burbank, California); Funky Joint Studios (Sherman Oaks, California); The Soul Shack (Van Nuys, California); BearTracks Studios (Suffern, New York); Broadway Productions and Masters At Work (New York City, New York)
- Genre: Jazz
- Length: 44:22
- Label: GRP
- Producers: Paul Brown; Kenny "Dope" Gonzalez; Little Louie Vega

George Benson chronology
That's Right (1996)	Standing Together (1998)	Absolute Benson (2000)

Singles from Standing Together
- 1. "Standing Together" Released: 1998; 2. "Cruise Control" Released: 1998; 3. "My Father, My Son" Released: 1998

Professional ratings
Review scores
Source	Rating
Allmusic	3/5 stars

Standing Together is an album by jazz guitarist George Benson that was released in 1998.

The album includes a hidden track Benson recorded before Star of A Story.

== Track listing ==
1. "C-Smooth" (DeChown Jenkins, Jaz Sawyer) – 5:54
2. "Standing Together" (Manuel Seals, Steven Dubin) – 4:07
3. "All I Know" (Peter Roberts, Scott Cross) – 4:36
4. "Cruise Control" (Alex Al, Paul Peterson, Ricky Peterson) – 5:08
5. "Poquito Spanish, Poquito Funk" (George Benson, Carl K. Gonzalez, Louie Vega) – 5:15
6. "Still Waters" (Larry Loftin) – 4:36
7. "Fly by Night" (Paul Brown, Steven Dubin, Tim Heintz) – 4:51
8. "Back to Love" (Audrez Martells, Gary Haas) – 4:39
9. "Keep Rollin'" (Gerald McCauley, Nils Jiptner) – 5:11

=== Bonus track ===
10. "You Can Do It, Baby" (George Benson, Carl K. Gonzalez, Louie Vega) – 7:04

=== Japanese bonus track ===
11. "Turn It Up" (George Benson) – 2:11

== Personnel and credits ==
Musicians

- George Benson – guitar (1, 3–5, 7–11), lead vocals (2, 3, 5, 6, 10, 11), vocals (4, 7–9)
- Robert C. Benson – programming (1)
- Melvin Lee Davis – keyboards (1)
- Ricky Peterson – Moog synthesizer (1), vibraphone (1), keyboards (3, 4, 6, 8, 11), acoustic piano solo (4), synth bass (8)
- Steve Dubin – programming (2, 7)
- Tim Heintz – keyboards (2, 7), synth strings (4)
- Albert "Sterling" Menendez – keyboards (5, 10)
- Paul Brown – programming (6)
- Gerald McCauley – keyboards (9), programming (9)
- DeChown Jenkins – rhythm guitar (1, 4, 7)
- Mike Sims – guitars (2)
- Paul Jackson Jr. – rhythm guitar (3)
- Marc Antoine – Spanish guitar (6)
- Nils Jiptner – rhythm guitar (9)
- Alex Al – bass (1, 4, 9, 11)
- Larry Kimpel – bass (3)
- Carlos Henriquez – upright bass (5)
- Lil' John Roberts – drums (1, 3, 4, 6, 8, 11), cymbals (9)
- Kevin Ricard – percussion (1, 9)
- Lenny Castro – percussion (2–4, 6–8)
- Luisito Quintero – percussion (5)
- Larry Williams – saxophones (3)
- Bill Reichenbach Jr. – trombone (3)
- Jerry Hey – trumpet (3)
- Sue Ann Carwell – backing vocals (3)
- Jeff Pescetto – backing vocals (3)
- Benny Diggs – backing vocals (5)
- La India – backing vocals (5)
- Reggie Burrell – backing vocals (6)
- Voncielle Faggett – backing vocals (6)
- Bridgette Bryant-Fiddmont – backing vocals (8)
- Kevon Edmonds – backing vocals (8)
- Lynne Fiddmont – backing vocals (8)
- Fred White – backing vocals (8)

Music arrangements

- George Benson – arrangements
- DeChown Jenkins – arrangements (1)
- Steve Dubin – arrangements (2, 7)
- Ricky Peterson – arrangements (3, 4, 6, 8, 11)
- Paul Brown – arrangements (3, 6, 8, 11)
- Jerry Hey – horn arrangements (3)
- Gerald McCauley – arrangements (9)

Production

- Tommy LiPuma – executive producer
- Paul Brown – producer (1–4, 6–9, 11)
- Steve Dubin – co-producer (2, 7)
- Kenny "Dope" Gonzalez – producer (5, 10)
- Little Louie Vega – producer (5, 10)
- Gerald McCauley – co-producer (9)
- Lexy Shroyer – production coordination (1–4, 6–9, 11)
- Daniela Federici – photography
- Hollis King – art direction
- Isabelle Wong – graphic design
- Dennis Turner for Turner Management Group, Inc. – career direction

Technical credits

- Doug Sax – mastering at The Mastering Lab (Hollywood, California)
- Paul Brown – mixing (1, 7, 9)
- Dave Rideau – engineer (1–4, 6–9, 11), mixing (2–4, 6, 8, 11)
- Dave Darlington – recording (5), mix engineer (5)
- Kenny "Dope" Gonzalez – mixing (5, 10)
- Little Louie Vega – mixing (5, 10)
- Martin Christianson – engineer (7)
- Tim Tan – engineer (9)
- Stuart Brawley – assistant engineer (1–4, 6–9, 11)
- Rick Pohronezny – assistant engineer (1–4, 6–9, 11)
- Daniel Steinberg – assistant engineer (1–4, 6–9, 11)
- Wassim Zreik – assistant engineer (1–4, 6–9, 11)
- Oscar Monsalve – assistant engineer (5)
- Oscar Ramirez – assistant engineer (5)

== Charts ==
Chart (1998)	Peak position
US Top Jazz Albums (Billboard)	1
US Top R&B/Hip-Hop Albums (Billboard)	47
