= Turn Your Love Around =

1981 single by George Benson

Single by George Benson

from the album The George Benson Collection
- B-side: "Nature Boy"
- Released: October 1981
- Genre: Pop; R&B
- Length: 3:50
- Label: Warner Bros.
- Songwriters: Bill Champlin; Jay Graydon; Steve Lukather
- Producer: Jay Graydon

George Benson singles chronology
"Love All the Hurt Away" (1981)	"Turn Your Love Around" (1981)	"Never Give Up on a Good Thing" (1981)

Music video
- "Turn Your Love Around" on YouTube

"Turn Your Love Around" is a song by George Benson. The song was written by Bill Champlin of Chicago, Steve Lukather of Toto and producer and guitarist Jay Graydon to help fill out Benson's 1981 greatest hits album, The George Benson Collection. The song won a Best R&B Song Grammy Award at the 25th Grammy Awards in 1983 for Champlin, Graydon, and Lukather as its co-writers.

== Background ==
The inspiration for the song came to Graydon in the bathroom. He explained to Songfacts, "'Turn Your Love Around' was a gift, and it's the gift that keeps giving. I was in the bathroom when I came up with the melody, and I was sitting down, if you get my drift. Well, I got off the can as fast as I could and got to a cassette machine so I wouldn't forget it. George Benson was coming in town Tuesday, so I had four days to come up with a song for The George Benson Collection. And I was gettin' nothing. And then bang! I just came up with this melody for the chorus when I was in the bathroom." The song was one of the first pop hits to use a Linn LM-1 drum machine, programmed by the session drummer Jeff Porcaro.

== Personnel ==
- George Benson – lead vocals
- Jai Winding – acoustic piano, Fender Rhodes
- David Foster – synthesizer
- Jay Graydon – synthesizer, guitars, arrangements
- David Paich – synthesizer bass
- Jeff Porcaro – Linn LM-1 drum programming
- Mike Baird – cymbals
- Gary Herbig – saxophone, flutes
- Bill Reichenbach Jr. – trombone
- Chuck Findley – trumpet
- Jerry Hey – trumpet, horn arrangements
- Bill Champlin – backing vocals
- Venette Gloud – backing vocals
- Carmen Twillie – backing vocals

== Charts ==
=== Weekly charts ===
Chart (1981–1982)	Peak position
Australia (Kent Music Report)	21
Canada Top Singles (RPM)	10
Canada Adult Contemporary	5
New Zealand	13
South Africa (Springbok)	14
UK Singles (Official Charts)	29
US Billboard Hot 100	5
US Billboard Adult Contemporary	9
US Billboard R&B Singles	1
US Cash Box Top 100	5

=== Year-end charts ===
Annual chart rankings for "Turn Your Love Around"
Chart (1981)	Rank
Australia (Kent Music Report)	142
Italy (Musica e dischi)	100
US Cash Box Top 100	70

Chart (1982)	Rank
US Billboard Hot 100	27

"Turn Your Love Around" reached number one on the soul singles chart and number five on the Billboard Hot 100 singles chart in early 1982, as well as the top ten on the jazz chart. It was ranked as the 27th biggest hit of 1982. In Canada, the song spent two weeks at number 10.

== Tony Di Bart version ==
"Turn Your Love Around"

Single by Tony Di Bart

from the album Falling for You
- Released: February 19, 1996
- Recorded: 1995
- Genre: Eurodance
- Length: 3:57
- Label: Cleveland City Blues
- Songwriters: Bill Champlin; Jay Graydon; Steve Lukather
- Producer: The Joy Brothers

Tony Di Bart singles chronology
"Why Did Ya" (1995)	"Turn Your Love Around" (1996)	"We Got the Love" (1997)

In 1995, Tony Di Bart recorded a cover version of "Turn Your Love Around" which appeared on the album Falling for You. Compared to the original, this version is Eurodance-heavy. In addition to the studio album, it is also included on the compilation Dance Now! 14.

=== Charts ===
Chart (1996)	Peak position
UK Singles (OCC)	66
Netherlands	44
Belgium	40

== Sampling ==
The song was sampled in the album version of Lil' Kim's song "Not Tonight", in Spice 1's "The Thug in Me", in the Japanese hit song "Da.Yo.Ne." by East End X Yuri in 1994, and in "My Love" by Mercedes featuring Mr. Serv-On in 1999.
