= Shiver (George Benson song) =

Single by George Benson

from the album While the City Sleeps...
- Released: 1986
- Genre: R&B
- Length: 3:36 (single version); 5:18 (album version); 7:33 (extended version)
- Label: Warner Bros.
- Songwriters: Narada Michael Walden; Preston Glass; Suzanne Valentine
- Producer: Narada Michael Walden

George Benson singles chronology
"Kisses in the Moonlight" (1986)	"Shiver" (1986)	"Teaser" (1987)

"Shiver" is a single by American R&B singer George Benson, which entered the UK Singles Chart on 29 November 1986. It reached a peak position of #19, and remained in the chart for 9 weeks. It was written by Narada Michael Walden, Preston Glass and Suzanne Valentine.

== Chart ==
=== Weekly Chart ===
Chart (1986)	Peak position
UK Singles (Official Charts)	19

== Credits ==
Credits adapted from the album's liner notes.

Studio

- Sterling Sound – mastering

Personnel

- Narada Michael Walden – producer, songwriting, drums
- Preston Glass – associate producer, songwriting, bass sequencing, keyboards, strings, drum programming
- Suzanne Valentine – songwriting, backing vocals
- George Benson – vocals, lead guitars
- Walter Afanasieff – keyboards
- Alan Glass – rhythm guitar
- Jim Gilstrap – backing vocals
- Kitty Beethoven – backing vocals
- Jennifer Hall – backing vocals
- Lincoln Clapp – vocal and guitar engineer
- Greg Calbi – mastering
