= Never Give Up on a Good Thing =

- U.S. vinyl single

Single by George Benson

from the album The George Benson Collection
- B-side: "Livin' Inside Your Love"
- Released: December 1981
- Genre: R&B; Post-disco
- Length: 4:06
- Label: Warner Bros.
- Songwriters: Michael Garvin, Tom Shapiro
- Producer: Jay Graydon

George Benson singles chronology
"Turn Your Love Around" (1981)	"Never Give Up on a Good Thing" (1981)	"Inside Love (So Personal)" (1983)

Official Audio
- "Never Give up on a Good Thing" (2015 GH Version) on YouTube

"Never Give Up on a Good Thing" is a song by American jazz fusion musician George Benson, released as a single in December 1981. It entered the UK Singles Chart on 23 January 1982, and reached a peak position of number 14. It remained on the chart for 10 weeks.

The song was written by Michael Garvin and Tom Shapiro. It was issued on Warner Bros. Records and appears on The George Benson Collection, released in 1981. The single's B-side is "Livin' Inside Your Love".

== Personnel ==
Sources:

- Trombone – Bill Reichenbach Jr.
- Trumpet – Chuck Findley
- Flute, saxophone – Gary Herbig
- Guitar, vocals – George Benson
- Electric piano – Greg Phillinganes
- Horn, trumpet – Jerry Hey
- Drums – John Robinson
- Piano, synthesizer – Michael Omartian
- Bass guitar – Neil Stubenhaus
- Percussion – Paulinho da Costa
- Guitar – Steve Lukather

== Charts ==
Chart (1982)	Peak position
Canada RPM Adult Contemporary	18
Ireland (IRMA)	23
New Zealand	14
UK (The Official Charts Company)	14
US Billboard Hot 100	52
US Billboard R&B	16
US Cash Box Top 100	55

== Link ==
- Lyrics
