= While the City Sleeps... =

Studio album by George Benson
- Released: August 25, 1986
- Recorded: 1985–1986
- Studios: Tarpan Studios (San Rafael, California); Capitol Studios (Hollywood, California); Mediasound, Clinton Recording Studios, The Hit Factory and Atlantic Studios (New York City, New York)
- Genres: Pop; jazz pop
- Length: 38:13
- Label: Warner Bros.
- Producers: Narada Michael Walden; Tommy LiPuma; Robbie Buchanan; Kashif; Preston Glass (associate)

George Benson chronology
20/20 (1985)	While the City Sleeps... (1986)	Collaboration (1987)

Singles from While the City Sleeps...
- 1. "Kisses in the Moonlight" Released: 1986; 2. "Shiver" Released: 1986; 3. "Teaser" Released: 1987

While the City Sleeps... is a 1986 studio album by American guitarist and singer George Benson, released on Warner Bros. Records. It features musicians like Paulinho da Costa, Preston Glass, Paul Jackson, Jr., Marcus Miller and Narada Michael Walden (as drummer and producer), alongside young talents of the time like Kenny G, Randy Jackson and Kashif. Although it does not have any instrumental tracks, Benson's guitar playing is somewhat in the headlight in songs like "Love Is Here Tonight", "Teaser" and "Too Many Times". The most successful single of the album, "Kisses in the Moonlight", is still frequently played by Benson at live performances and is present on many of his compilation albums (The Best of George Benson, The George Benson Anthology, The Essential Selection, etc.) On the B-side of the "Kisses in the Moonlight" single – alongside "Breezin'" (Special Mix) on the 12" version – is the instrumental song "Open Your Eyes" (George Benson/Ronnie Foster) (producer: Tommy LiPuma, engineer: Eric Calvi) which is not available elsewhere.

Shortly after the album's release, Benson performed "Love Is Here Tonight" in its entirety while guest starring in season three of the detective show Mickey Spillane's Mike Hammer.

== Reception ==
Professional ratings
Review scores
Source	Rating
AllMusic	1.5/5 stars

Like many of Benson's pop albums, While the City Sleeps... was criticized for the absence of his distinctive jazz guitar instrumentals.

== Track listing ==
No.	Title	Writer(s)	Producer(s)	Length
1.	"While the City Sleeps"	Dave Innis, Sam Lorber	Tommy LiPuma, Robbie Buchanan	3:35
2.	"Kisses in the Moonlight"	Jeffrey Cohen, Preston Glass, Narada Michael Walden	Narada Michael Walden	4:21
3.	"Shiver"	Preston Glass, Suzanne Valentine, Narada Michael Walden	Narada Michael Walden, Preston Glass (associate)	5:23
4.	"Love Is Here Tonight"	George Benson, Jeffrey Cohen	Narada Michael Walden	5:43
5.	"Teaser"	Jeffrey Cohen, David Jenkins, Cory Lerios, Narada Michael Walden	Narada Michael Walden	4:40
6.	"Secrets in the Night"	Kashif, Greg Phillinganes	Kashif	5:50
7.	"Too Many Times"	Walter Afanasieff, Preston Glass	Narada Michael Walden	4:37
8.	"Did You Hear Thunder"	Dean Pitchford, Tom Snow	Tommy LiPuma, Robbie Buchanan	3:50

== Personnel ==
Adapted from the album's liner notes.

Musicians:

- George Benson – lead vocals, lead guitar (2–8)
- Robbie Buchanan – keyboards (1, 8), synthesizers (1, 8), synth bass (1, 8)
- Andrew Thomas – PPG Waveterm synthesizer programming (1, 8)
- Frank Martin – synthesizers (2)
- Preston Glass – synthesizers (2), bass sequencing (2, 3), percussion programming (2), keyboards (3, 4), strings (3), drum programming (3), TR-808 programming (4), additional drum programming (7)
- Walter Afanasieff – keyboards (3), additional keyboards (5), synthesizers (7)
- Cory Lerios – keyboards (5), synth bass sequencing (5)
- Sterling Smith – synth horns (5)
- Kashif – keyboards (6), all other instruments (6)
- Greg Phillinganes – keyboards (6)
- Larry Smith – Synclavier programming (6)
- John S. Dranchak – Synclavier programming assistant (6)
- Paul Jackson Jr. – rhythm guitar (1, 8)
- Alan Glass – rhythm guitar (3)
- Corrado Rustici – Charvel GTM6 MIDI guitar synthesizer (4)
- David Jenkins – rhythm guitar (5), backing vocals (5)
- Paul Pesco – rhythm guitar (6)
- Chris Camozzi – rhythm guitar (7)
- Marcus Miller – bass (1)
- Randy Jackson – Fender bass (4), Moog Source (7)
- John Robinson – drums (1, 8)
- Narada Michael Walden – drum programming (2, 4, 7), drums (3, 5)
- Yogi Horton – drums (6)
- Paulinho da Costa – percussion (1, 8)
- Gigi Gonaway – Simmons toms (2), Paiste cymbals (2, 7), Simmons drum fills (7)
- Kenny G – saxophone (1, 8)
- Janey Clewer – backing vocals (1, 8)
- Jim Gilstrap – backing vocals (1, 3, 4, 7, 8)
- Marlena Jeter – backing vocals (1)
- John Lehman – backing vocals (1, 8)
- Claytoven Richardson – backing vocals (2–4, 7)
- Kitty Beethoven – backing vocals (3, 4, 7)
- Jennifer Hall – backing vocals (3–5, 7)
- Suzanne Valentine – backing vocals (3)
- Bud Cockrell – backing vocals (5)
- Carolyn Hedrich – backing vocals (5)
- Cindy Mizelle – backing vocals (6)
- Audrey Wheeler – backing vocals (6)

Music arrangements

- Robbie Buchanan – arrangements (1, 8)
- Jerry Hey – string arrangements (2, 4, 7)
- Narada Michael Walden – arrangements (2–5, 7)
- Kashif – rhythm arrangements (6)
- Greg Phillinganes – rhythm arrangements (6)
- Ralph Schuckett – string arrangements (6)

== Production ==
- Larry Fishman – production coordinator (1, 8)
- Janice Lee – production coordinator (2–5, 7)
- Cynthia Shilow – production coordinator (2–5, 7)
- Russell Sidelsky – production coordinator (6)
- Nancy Y. Mallory – project assistant (6)
- Lu Snead – project coordinator
- Kav Deluxe – art direction, design
- Caroline Greyshock – photography
- Hugo Boss – clothing
- Jeff Sayre – clothing
- Fritz/Turner Management, L.A. – direction

Technical credits

- Greg Calbi – mastering at Sterling Sound (New York, NY)
- Elliot Scheiner – engineer (1, 8)
- Eric Calvi – mixing (1, 8)
- David Frazer – chief and mix engineer (2–5, 7)
- Darrell Gustamachio – engineer (6), mixing (6)
- Peter Doell – additional recording (1, 8)
- Michael O'Reilly – additional recording (1)
- Jay Rifkin – additional recording (1, 8)
- Lincoln Clapp – additional engineer for vocals and guitar (3)
- Eddie Garcia – assistant mix engineer (1, 8)
- Joe Martin – assistant engineer (1, 8)
- Victor Beyglio – assistant engineer (2–5, 7)
- Dana Jon Chappelle – assistant engineer (2–5, 7), additional engineer for keyboards and guitar (7)
- Stuart Hirotsu – assistant engineer (2–5, 7)
- Gordon Lyon – assistant engineer (2–5, 7), additional engineer for keyboards (5)
- Larry Smith – assistant engineer (6)
- John S. Dranchak – studio assistant (6)
- Kevin Wallace – studio assistant (6)

== Charts ==
Album charts (weekly)
Chart (1986)	Peak position
Dutch Albums Top 100	25
German Top 100 Albums	48
Swedish Albums Top 60	31
UK Albums Chart	13
US Top Contemporary Jazz Albums	8
US R&B Albums	21
US Billboard 200	124

Song charts
Year	Title	Chart peak positions		
Year	Title	Hot R&B/Hip-Hop Singles & Tracks	UK	NL
1986	"Kisses in the Moonlight"	13	60	32
1986	"Shiver"	16	19	-
1987	"Teaser"	-	45	-

== Certifications ==
Region	Certification	Certified units/sales
Japan	—	21,100
United Kingdom (BPI)	Gold	100,000^{^}
^{^} Shipments figures based on certification alone.
