= Livin' Inside Your Love =

Studio album by George Benson
- Released: February 1979
- Studios: Atlantic (New York); Columbia 30th Street (New York); Capitol (Hollywood)
- Genre: Jazz
- Length: 66:50
- Label: Warner Bros.
- Producer: Tommy LiPuma

George Benson chronology
Space (1978)	Livin' Inside Your Love (1979)	Give Me the Night (1980)

Singles from Livin' Inside Your Love
- 1. "Unchained Melody" Released: 1979; 2. "Love Ballad" Released: 1979; 3. "Hey Girl" Released: 1979

Livin' Inside Your Love is the seventeenth album by jazz guitarist George Benson, released in 1979. In the United States, it was certified Gold by the RIAA.

== Critical reception ==
Professional ratings
Review scores
Source	Rating
AllMusic	2.5/5 stars
Music Week	4/4 stars
Omaha World-Herald	4/5 stars
The Rolling Stone Jazz Record Guide	3/5 stars
Smash Hits	4/10

The Omaha World-Herald opined that the music "is not as deep as [Benson] is capable of," but "occasionally inspired."

== Track listing ==
Side A

1. "Livin' Inside Your Love" (Earl Klugh) – 6:37
2. "Hey Girl" (Gerry Goffin, Carole King) – 4:31
3. "Nassau Day" (Ronnie Foster) – 6:14

Side B

1. "Soulful Strut" (Eugene Record, Sonny Sanders) – 5:37
2. "Prelude to Fall" (Ronnie Foster) – 6:30
3. "A Change Is Gonna Come" (Sam Cooke) – 3:47

Side C

1. "Love Ballad" (Skip Scarborough) – 5:15
2. "You're Never Too Far from Me" (George Benson) – 6:43
3. "Love Is a Hurtin' Thing" (Ben Raleigh, Dave Linden) – 4:25

Side D

1. "Welcome into My World" (George Benson) – 4:08
2. "Before You Go" (George Benson) – 6:27
3. "Unchained Melody" (Alex North, Hy Zaret) – 6:36

== Personnel ==
Musicians

- George Benson – vocals, guitars
- Jorge Dalto – acoustic piano, clavinet, Wurlitzer electric piano, Fender Rhodes, acoustic piano solo (9)
- Ronnie Foster – Fender Rhodes, Yamaha CS30, Minimoog, Polymoog, acoustic piano solo (3, 5), Fender Rhodes solo (10, 11), Minimoog solo (11)
- Greg Phillinganes – Fender Rhodes (2)
- Phil Upchurch – rhythm guitar
- Earl Klugh – acoustic guitar, classical guitar solo (1)
- Will Lee – bass guitar (1–4, 8, 9, 12)
- Robert Popwell – bass guitar (5, 6, 10)
- Stanley Banks – bass guitar (7, 11)
- Steve Gadd – drums (all tracks)
- Ralph MacDonald – percussion (all tracks)
- Mike Mainieri – vibraphone (5)

Orchestration

- Mike Mainieri – orchestrations and conductor (1, 5, 7)
- Claus Ogerman – orchestrations and conductor (2–4, 6, 8–12)

Production

- Tommy LiPuma – producer
- Al Schmitt – recording, mixing
- Don Henderson – assistant engineer
- Michael O'Reilly – assistant engineer
- Mike Reese – mastering at The Mastering Lab (Hollywood, California)
- Jill Harris – production coordinator
- Christine Martin – production coordinator, music contractor
- Frank DeCaro – music contractor
- John Cabalka – art direction
- Brad Kanawyer – design
- Tom Bert – photography
- Ken Fritz, Dennis Turner and Connie Pappas for Ken Fritz Management – direction
