= The Greatest (1977 film) =

1977 film about Muhammad Ali

- Theatrical release poster by John Solie
- Directed by: Tom Gries
- Screenplay by: Ring Lardner Jr.
- Based on: The Greatest: My Own Story; 1975 book by Muhammad Ali; Herbert Muhammad; Richard Durham
- Produced by: John Marshall
- Starring: Muhammad Ali; Ernest Borgnine; John Marley; Lloyd Haynes; Robert Duvall; David Huddleston; Ben Johnson; James Earl Jones; Dina Merrill; Roger E. Mosley; Paul Winfield; Annazette Chase; Mira Waters
- Cinematography: Harry Stradling Jr.
- Edited by: Byron Brandt
- Music by: Michael Masser
- Production companies: British Lion Films; EMI Films
- Distributed by: Columbia Pictures
- Release date: 19 May 1977
- Running time: 101 minutes
- Countries: United States; United Kingdom
- Language: English
- Box office: $8.36 million (US)

The Greatest is a 1977 biographical sports film about the life of boxer Muhammad Ali, in which Ali plays himself. It was directed by Tom Gries. The film follows Ali's life from the 1960 Summer Olympics to his regaining the heavyweight crown from George Foreman in their famous "Rumble in the Jungle" fight in 1974. Archival footage of Ali's boxing matches are used in the picture.

The film is based on the book The Greatest: My Own Story written by Muhammad Ali and Richard Durham and edited by Toni Morrison.

The song "The Greatest Love of All" was written for this film by Michael Masser (music) and Linda Creed (lyrics), and sung by George Benson; it was later covered and made a Billboard Hot 100 #1 single by Whitney Houston.

== Plot ==
The story of Cassius Clay, who became heavyweight champion as Muhammad Ali. Tracing his rise from his Olympic gold medal as a light-heavyweight at Rome in 1960, his conversion to Islam, his refusal to serve in the Vietnam war, to his return to the ring. The film concludes with him regaining the title by knocking out George Foreman in the "Rumble in the Jungle".

== Cast ==
- Muhammad Ali as Himself
  - Chip McAllister as Young Cassius Clay / Muhammad Ali
- Ernest Borgnine as Angelo Dundee
- John Marley as Dr. Ferdie Pacheco
- Lloyd Haynes as Jabir Herbert Muhammad
- Robert Duvall as Bill McDonald
- David Huddleston as Cruikshank
- Ben Johnson as Hollis
- James Earl Jones as Malcolm X
- Dina Merrill as "Velvet" Green
- Roger E. Mosley as Sonny Liston
- Paul Winfield as Mr. Eskridge
- Annazette Chase as Belinda Boyd Ali
- Mira Waters as Ruby Sanderson
- Drew Bundini Brown as Himself
- Malachi Throne as Payton Jory
- Richard Venture as Colonel Cedrich
- Arthur Adams as Cassius Marcellus Clay Sr.
- Stack Pierce as Rahaman
- Paul Mantee as Carrara
- Skip Homeier as Major Canlan
- David Clennon as Captain
- Nai Bonet as Suzie Gomez

Rahaman Ali, Howard Bingham, Harold Conrad, Don Dunphy, Lloyd Wells, Pat Patterson, and Gene Kilroy appear as themselves.

There are many uncredited roles in the film including some major characters, such as Ruby Sanderson and his girlfriend, Belinda Board, who became his wife, and Herbert Mohammed, son of Elijah Muhammad, who was Ali's manager at one point.

Lonette McKee was originally going to portray the role played by Annazette Chase.

== Soundtrack ==
All music composed and produced by Michael Masser, and arranged by Masser and Lee Holdridge.

Side 1
No.	Title	Lyrics	Length
1.	"The Greatest Love of All" (George Benson)	Linda Creed	5:32
2.	"I Always Knew I Had It in Me" (Benson; version 1)	Gerry Goffin	7:14
3.	"Ali's Theme" (Masser)	—	5:18

Side 2
No.	Title	Lyrics	Length
1.	"Ali Bombaye (Zaire Chant) I" (Masser and Mandrill)	—	3:42
2.	"Ali Bombaye (Zaire Chant) II" (Masser and Mandrill)	—	3:00
3.	"The Greatest Love of All" (Masser)	—	3:14
4.	"Variations on Theme" (Masser)	—	2:34
5.	"I Always Knew I Had It in Me" (Benson; version 2)	Goffin	5:21

== Production ==
The film was made with finance from Britain's EMI Films.

== Reception ==
Vincent Canby of The New York Times called the film "a charming curio of a sort Hollywood doesn't seem to make much anymore." Kevin Thomas of the Los Angeles Times called the film "potent pop biography, lively and entertaining, in which the irrepressible world's heavyweight boxing champion projects exactly the image he wants us to have." Gene Siskel of the Chicago Tribune gave the film 2.5 stars out of 4 and wrote, "As a diverting entertainment, 'The Greatest' is more than satisfactory." Arthur D. Murphy of Variety wrote that Ali brought the film "an authority and a presence that lift John Marshall's production above some of the limitations inherent in any film bio." David Badder of The Monthly Film Bulletin stated, "The Greatest delivers exactly what one would expect: a hagiographical account of Ali's best-known exploits, giving full rein to the inimitable, volatile personality but in the process applying liberal coats of whitewash."

During its first week in release, The Greatest successfully topped the U.S. box office chart, earning $1,361,800 in rentals. By the end of the year, it earned $3.8 million in US rentals. It grossed a total of $8.36 million in the US from an estimated 3,782,000 ticket sales.

== See also ==
- List of boxing films
