= Marlena (Marlena Shaw album) =

Studio album by Marlena Shaw
- Released: 1972
- Recorded: August 10, 11 & 16, 1972
- Studio: A&R Studios, New York City
- Genre: Jazz
- Length: 40:52
- Label: Blue Note
- Producer: Dr. George Butler

Marlena Shaw chronology
The Spice of Life (1969)	Marlena (1972)	From the Depths of My Soul (1973)

Marlena is an album by American vocalist Marlena Shaw recorded in 1972 and released on the Blue Note label. The album was Shaw's third release and her first for the Blue Note label.

== Track listing ==
1. "What Are You Doing the Rest of Your Life?" (Alan Bergman, Marilyn Bergman, Michel Legrand) - 5:08
2. "Somewhere" (Stephen Sondheim, Leonard Bernstein) - 3:28
3. "Runnin' Out of Fools" (Kay Rogers, Richard Ahlert) - 4:48
4. "So Far Away" (Carole King) - 3:58
5. "I'm Gonna Find Out" (Ralph Harrington) - 3:52
6. "Save the Children" (Al Cleveland, Renaldo Benson, Marvin Gaye) - 4:08
7. "You Must Believe in Spring" (Alan Bergman, Marilyn Bergman, Jacques Demy, Michel Legrand) - 4:34
8. "Wipe Away the Evil" (Horace Silver) - 5:01
9. "Things Don't Never Go My Way" (Tommy Faile) - 5:55

- Recorded at A&R Studios in New York City on August 10 (tracks 1, 2, 7 & 8) and August 11 (tracks 3–6 & 9) with overdubbed strings recorded on August 16, 1972.

== Personnel ==
- Marlena Shaw - vocals
- Phil Bodner - flute, oboe, english horn
- Derek Smith - piano, electric piano
- Paul Griffin - electronic organ, electric piano
- Vincent Bell, Jay Berliner, Cornell Dupree - guitar
- Richard Davis - double bass
- Gordon Edwards - electric bass
- Jimmy Johnson - drums
- Raymond Orchart - conga
- Johnny Pacheco - conga, bongos
- Omar Clay - percussion
- Wade Marcus - arranger, conductor
- Paul Gershman, Louis Haber, Harry Lookofsky, Irving Spice, Louis Stone, Paul Winter - violin
- Julian Barber, Seymour Berman - viola
- Seymour Barab, Charles McCraken - cello
- Eugene Bianco - harp
