= Dig This! =

Studio album by Bobbi Humphrey
- Released: 1972
- Recorded: July 20–21, 1972
- Genre: Jazz
- Label: Blue Note
- Producer: George Butler

Bobbi Humphrey chronology
Flute-In (1971)	Dig This! (1972)	Blacks and Blues (1973)

Dig This! is an album by American jazz flautist Bobbi Humphrey recorded in 1972 and released on the Blue Note label.

== Reception ==
The AllMusic review awarded the album 4 stars.

Professional ratings
Review scores
Source	Rating
AllMusic	4/5 stars

== Track listing ==
1. "Lonely Town, Lonely Street" (Bill Withers) - 4:33
2. "Is This All?" (Henry Johnson) - 3:42
3. "Smiling Faces Sometimes" (Barrett Strong, Norman Whitfield) - 6:18
4. "Virtue" (Alphonse Mouzon) - 4:25
5. "I Love Every Little Thing About You" (Stevie Wonder) - 4:18
6. "Love Theme from "Fuzz"" (Dave Grusin) - 3:45
7. "El Mundo de Maravillas" (Mouzon) - 7:30
8. "Nubian Lady" (Kenny Barron) - 4:45
- Recorded at A&R Studios in New York City on July 20 & 21, 1972.

== Personnel ==
- Bobbi Humphrey - flute
- George Marge - oboe, English horn
- Seymour Berman, Paul Gershman, Irving Spice, Paul Winter - violin
- Julian Barber - viola
- Seymour Barab - cello
- Eugene Bianco - harp
- Harry Whitaker - electric piano
- Paul Griffin - electric piano, clavinet
- William Fontaine, David Spinozza - guitar
- Ron Carter - bass
- Wilbur Bascomb, Jr. - electric bass
- Alphonse Mouzon - drums, bell tree, arranger
- Warren Smith - percussion
- Wade Marcus, Horace Ott - arranger
