= Ronnie Foster Live: Cookin' with Blue Note at Montreux =

Live album by Ronnie Foster
- Released: 1974
- Recorded: July 5, 1973
- Venue: Montreux Jazz Festival; Montreux, Switzerland
- Genre: Jazz
- Label: Blue Note
- Producer: George Butler

Ronnie Foster chronology
Sweet Revival (1972)	Ronnie Foster Live: Cookin' with Blue Note at Montreux (1974)	On the Avenue (1974)

Ronnie Foster Live: Cookin' with Blue Note at Montreux is a live album by American jazz organist Ronnie Foster recorded at the Montreux Jazz Festival in 1973 and released on the Blue Note label.

== Reception ==
The AllMusic review awarded the album 3 stars.

Professional ratings
Review scores
Source	Rating
AllMusic	3/5 stars

== Track listing ==
All compositions by Ronnie Foster except as indicated

1. "East Of Ginger Trees" (Jim Seals, Dash Croft) - 11:48
2. "Chunky" - 8:12
3. "Boogie Juice" - 14:00
4. "Sameness" - 11:24

== Personnel ==
- Ronnie Foster - organ
- Gregory Miller - guitar
- Marvin Chappell - drums

== See also ==
The four other albums of the "Cookin' with Blue Note at Montreux" series:

- Bobby Hutcherson Live at Montreux
- Live at Montreux (Bobbi Humphrey album)
- Live: Cookin' with Blue Note at Montreux
- Marlena Shaw Live at Montreux
