= Bobby Hutcherson Live at Montreux =

Live album by Bobby Hutcherson
- Released: 1974; 1994 (CD)
- Recorded: July 5, 1973
- Venue: Montreux Music & Convention Centre, Montreux, Switzerland
- Genre: Jazz
- Length: 50:17
- Label: Blue Note; BN LA 249; CDP 7243 8 27819 2 9
- Producer: George Butler

Bobby Hutcherson chronology
Natural Illusions (1972)	Bobby Hutcherson Live at Montreux (1974)	Cirrus (1974)

Alternative cover
- 1994 CD release

Bobby Hutcherson Live at Montreux is a live album by American jazz vibraphonist Bobby Hutcherson recorded at the Montreux Jazz Festival in 1973 and released on the Blue Note label in Japan and Europe only. The album was rereleased on CD with one additional performance from the concert.

== Reception ==
The AllMusic review by Michael G. Nastos awarded the album 4 stars and stated "Hutch and Shaw have ample room for solos, and they prove why they are the best in the business at inventing improvisations based on these viable themes. Ten years after these recordings, Shaw and Hutcherson would reunite for the trumpeter's Elektra Musician dates Night Music and Master of the Art. This excellent performance provides a perfect prelude to those equally potent sessions, and all come highly recommended".

Professional ratings
Review scores
Source	Rating
AllMusic	4/5 stars

== Track listing ==
Original release (1974)

All compositions by Bobby Hutcherson except as indicated
A1. " Anton's Bail" - 13:30
A2. "The Moontrane" (Woody Shaw) - 8:02
B1. "The Moontrane" – continued - 3:18
B2. "Song of Songs" (Shaw) - 13:28

CD release (1994)

1. " Anton's Bail" - 12:34
2. "The Moontrane" (Shaw) - 10:42
3. "Farallone" - 13:11 – Additional track
4. "Song of Songs" (Shaw) - 13:50

== Personnel ==
Musicians

- Bobby Hutcherson – vibes
- Woody Shaw – trumpet
- Cecil Bernard – piano
- Ray Drummond – bass
- Larry Hancock – drums

Production

- George Butler – producer
- Doug Metzler – photography
- Jere Hausfater – liner notes

== See also ==
The four other albums of the "Cookin' with Blue Note at Montreux" series:

- Live at Montreux (Bobbi Humphrey album)
- Live: Cookin' with Blue Note at Montreux
- Marlena Shaw Live at Montreux
- Ronnie Foster Live: Cookin' with Blue Note at Montreux
