= Live: Cookin' with Blue Note at Montreux =

Live album by Donald Byrd
- Released: December 9, 2022
- Recorded: July 5, 1973
- Venue: Montreux Jazz Festival
- Genre: Jazz; soul jazz
- Length: 45:24
- Label: Blue Note
- Producer: George Butler

Donald Byrd chronology
| Black Byrd (1973) | Live: Cookin' with Blue Note at Montreux (2022) | Street Lady (1974) |

Live: Cookin' with Blue Note at Montreux is a live album by American trumpeter Donald Byrd. It was recorded at the Montreux Jazz Festival in Switzerland on July 5, 1973, and was officially released on December 9, 2022—Byrd's would-be 90th birthday—by Blue Note Records.

The live album was one of five produced by Blue Note president George Butler of performances at the 1973 Montreux Jazz Festival; however, it remained untouched in the label's vault until Byrd's death in 2013, when Gilles Peterson inquired about its existence to the label. Leading up to its release, the album was previewed at a Blue Note pop-up store at Coal Drops Yard in London on November 11, 2022.

== Critical reception ==
In a review for Glide Magazine, Jim Hynes noted that the performance had a "slightly harder edge" than Byrd's previous album, Black Byrd, and added that the "45 minutes go by in a blink". Mike Hobart of the Financial Times rated Live: Cookin' with Blue Note at Montreux three out of five stars. Robert Baird, writing for Stereophile, considered the album an "undiscovered masterpiece".

== Track listing ==
Track order and lengths sourced from Spotify and Blue Note's official website.

Side One
| No. | Title | Writer(s) | Length |
|---|---|---|---|
| 1. | "Black Byrd" | Larry Mizell | 8:11 |
| 2. | "You've Got It Bad Girl" | Stevie Wonder | 7:42 |
| 3. | "The East" | Donald Byrd | 9:19 |

Side Two
| No. | Title | Writer(s) | Length |
|---|---|---|---|
| 4. | "Introductions" | | 2:58 |
| 5. | "Kwame" | Donald Byrd | 11:50 |
| 6. | "Poco-Mania" | Donald Byrd | 5:22 |
| Total length: | | | 45:24 |

== Personnel ==
- Donald Byrd – trumpet, flugelhorn, and vocals
- Fonce Mizell – trumpet and vocals
- Allan Barnes – tenor saxophone and flute
- Nathan Davis – tenor and soprano saxophone
- Kevin Toney – electric piano
- Larry Mizell – synthesizers
- Barney Perry – electric guitar
- Henry Franklin – electric bass
- Keith Killgo – drums and vocals
- Ray Armando – congas and percussion
- George Butler – producer
- Kevin Gray – mastering
- Chris Penycate – live recording
- Qmillion – mixing
- Gabe Lowry – assistance
- Norman Seeff – photography
- Meat and Potatoes, Inc. – package layout

== See also ==
The four other albums of the "Cookin' with Blue Note at Montreux" series:

- Bobby Hutcherson Live at Montreux
- Live at Montreux (Bobbi Humphrey album)
- Marlena Shaw Live at Montreux
- Ronnie Foster Live: Cookin' with Blue Note at Montreux
