= Two Headed Freap =

Studio album by Ronnie Foster
- Released: 1972
- Recorded: January 20–21, 1972
- Studio: Van Gelder Studio, Englewood Cliffs, New Jersey
- Genre: Jazz-funk
- Length: 37:02
- Label: Blue Note Records
- Producer: Dr. George Butler

Ronnie Foster chronology
Two Headed Freap (1972)	Sweet Revival (1972)

Two Headed Freap is the debut album by American organist Ronnie Foster, recorded in 1972 and released on the Blue Note label.

== Reception ==
The AllMusic review by Stephen Thomas Erlewine awarded the album 4½ stars and stated "Everything on Two Headed Freap is about glitzy groove – it sounds cinematic, colorful, and funky. It's true that there is little real improvisation here and the songs all have a similar groove, but it's worked well, and the music is ultimately appealing to fans of this genre. Jazz purists – even soul-jazz purists – will likely find this music a little monotonous and commercial, but fans of early-'70s funk from Sly Stone to Herbie Hancock will find something of interest here".

Professional ratings
Review scores
Source	Rating
AllMusic	4.5/5 stars

The track "Mystic Brew" has been sampled in a number of hip-hop songs, most notably "Electric Relaxation" by A Tribe Called Quest. It has also been covered by musicians including the Vijay Iyer Trio, BadBadNotGood, Kendrick Lamar and Mike Paradinas.

== Track listing ==
All tracks are written by Ronnie Foster except as noted.

No.	Title	Writer(s)	Length
1.	"Chunky"		4:50
2.	"Drowning in the Sea of Love"	Kenneth Gamble, Leon Huff	4:00
3.	"The Two-Headed Freap"		4:19
4.	"Summer Song"		5:20
5.	"Let's Stay Together"	Al Green, Al Jackson Jr., Willie Mitchell	4:50
6.	"Don't Knock My Love"	Wilson Pickett, Brad Shapiro	4:30
7.	"Mystic Brew"		4:13
8.	"Kentucky Fried Chicken"		5:00

- Recorded at Rudy Van Gelder Studio, Englewood Cliffs, New Jersey on January 20 (tracks 2 & 5–7) and January 21 (tracks 1, 3, 4 & 8), 1972.

== Personnel ==
- Ronnie Foster – organ
- Eugene Bianco – harp
- George Devens – vibes, cabasa, shaker, cowbell
- Gene Bertoncini – jazz guitar
- George Duvivier – double bass
- Gordon Edwards – bass guitar
- Jimmy Johnson – drums
- Arthur Jenkins – congas
- Wade Marcus – arranger
