= Marlena Shaw Live at Montreux =

Live album by Marlena Shaw
- Released: 1974; 1994 (CD in Japan)
- Recorded: July 5, 1973
- Venue: Montreux Jazz Festival, Montreux, Switzerland
- Genre: Jazz
- Length: 34:08
- Label: Blue Note; BN-LA 251-G: TOCJ-5876
- Producer: Dr. George Butler

Marlena Shaw chronology
From the Depths of My Soul (1973)	Marlena Shaw Live at Montreux (1974)	Who Is This Bitch, Anyway? (1975)

Alternative cover
- 1995 CD release

Marlena Shaw Live at Montreux is a live album by American vocalist Marlena Shaw recorded at the Montreux Jazz Festival in 1973 and released on the Blue Note label. Shaw's introduction to the track "Woman of the Ghetto" was sampled for St. Germain's album Tourist (2000), Blue Boy's "Remember Me" (1996), Ghostface Killah's song "Ghetto" (2010), and Spanish hip-hop group Violadores del Verso in their song "Balantains".

== Reception ==
The AllMusic review by Scott Yanow awarded the album 2 stars and stated "it features the R&Bish singer Marlena Shaw in a more spontaneous setting than usual with a trio led by pianist George Gaffney at the 1973 Montreux Jazz Festival. It is not too surprising that Shaw found her greatest successes in pop/soul music for the stylized way that she bends nearly every note and overplays the lyrics (not much subtlety here) fits that idiom quite well".

Professional ratings
Review scores
Source	Rating
AllMusic	2/5 stars

== Track listing ==
Original release (1974)

A1. "The Show Has Begun" (Horace Silver) – 3:50
A2. "The Song Is You" (Oscar Hammerstein II, Jerome Kern) – 2:20
A3. "You Are the Sunshine of My Life" (Stevie Wonder) – 4:20
A4. "Twisted" (Wardell Gray, Annie Ross) – 3:45
B1. "But for Now" (Bob Dorough) – 4:32
B2. "Save the Children" (Renaldo Benson, Al Cleveland, Marvin Gaye) – 4:20
B3. "Woman of the Ghetto" (Richard Evans, Bobby Miller, Marlena Shaw) – 9:20
- Recorded at the Montreux Jazz Festival in Montreux, Switzerland on July 5, 1973.

CD release (1994 in Japan)

1. "The Show Has Begun" (Horace Silver) – 4:48
2. "The Song Is You" (Oscar Hammerstein II, Jerome Kern) – 2:20
3. "You Are the Sunshine of My Life" (Stevie Wonder) – 4:26
4. "Twisted" (Wardell Gray, Annie Ross) – 3:48
5. "But for Now" (Bob Dorough) – 4:23
6. "Save the Children" (Renaldo Benson, Al Cleveland, Marvin Gaye) – 4:24
7. "Woman of the Ghetto" (Richard Evans, Bobby Miller, Marlena Shaw) – 9:59

== Personnel ==
- Marlena Shaw – vocals
- George Gaffney – piano, electric piano
- Ed Boyer – bass
- Harold Jones – drums

== See also ==
The four other albums of the "Cookin' with Blue Note at Montreux" series:

- Bobby Hutcherson Live at Montreux
- Live at Montreux (Bobbi Humphrey album)
- Live: Cookin' with Blue Note at Montreux
- Ronnie Foster Live: Cookin' with Blue Note at Montreux
