= Flute-In =

Studio album by Bobbi Humphrey
- Released: December 12, 1971
- Recorded: September 30 & October 1, 1971
- Studio: Van Gelder Studio, Englewood Cliffs, New Jersey
- Genre: Jazz
- Length: 39:18
- Label: Blue Note
- Producer: George Butler

Bobbi Humphrey chronology
Flute-In (1971)	Dig This! (1972)

Flute-In is the debut album by American jazz flautist Bobbi Humphrey, recorded in 1971 and released on the Blue Note label.

== Reception ==
AllMusic's Andrew Hamilton stated "Bobbi displays dexterity and power throughout her coming out, mainstream LP".

Professional ratings
Review scores
Source	Rating
AllMusic	4/5 stars

== Track listing ==
1. "Ain't No Sunshine" (Bill Withers) – 2:30
2. "It's Too Late" (Carole King) – 3:05
3. "The Sidewinder" (Lee Morgan) – 6:13
4. "Sad Bag" (Dick Griffin) – 5:05
5. "Spanish Harlem" (Jerry Leiber, Phil Spector) – 3:45
6. "Don't Knock My Funk" (W. Marcus Bey) – 4:36
7. "Journey to Morocco" (Bey) – 8:19
8. "Set Us Free" (Eddie Harris) – 5:45

- Recorded at Van Gelder Studio, Englewood Cliffs, New Jersey on September 30 & October 1, 1971

== Personnel ==
- Bobbi Humphrey – flute
- Lee Morgan – trumpet (tracks 3, 5–8)
- Billy Harper – tenor saxophone (tracks 3, 5–8)
- George Devens – vibes, marimba, percussion
- Hank Jones – piano, electric piano (tracks 1, 4, 7, 8)
- Frank Owens – piano, electric piano (tracks 2, 3, 5, 6)
- Gene Bertoncini – guitar
- George Duvivier – bass (tracks 1, 4, 7, 8)
- Gordon Edwards – electric bass (tracks 2, 3, 5, 6)
- Jimmy Johnson (tracks 2, 3, 5, 6), Idris Muhammad (tracks 1, 4, 7, 8) – drums
- Ray Armando – conga
- Wade Marcus – arranger
