= Head On (Bobby Hutcherson album) =

Studio album by Bobby Hutcherson
- Released: Late October/early November 1971; 2008 (CD)
- Recorded: July 1–3, 1971
- Studios: Poppi Recording Studios, Los Angeles
- Genre: Jazz
- Length: 35:16 (original LP); 78:31(CD)
- Labels: Blue Note; BST 84376; 50999 5 17464 2 1
- Producer: George Butler

Bobby Hutcherson chronology
San Francisco (1971)	Head On (1971)	Natural Illusions (1972)

Head On is an album by American jazz vibraphonist Bobby Hutcherson recorded in 1971 and released on the Blue Note label. The album was rereleased on CD in 2008 with three additional recordings from the sessions as bonus tracks.

== Reception ==
The AllMusic review by Matt Collar awarded the album 3 stars and stated "Head On is a highly cerebral and atmospheric affair that is somewhat different than his other equally experimental '70s work... Fans of expansive, searching '70s jazz will definitely want to seek Head On out".

Professional ratings
Review scores
Source	Rating
AllMusic	3/5 stars

== Track listing ==
Original release (1971)

A1. "At the Source: Ashes & Rust/Eucalyptus/Obsidian" (Todd Cochran) – 8:20
A2. "Many Thousands Gone" (Cochran) – 11:16
B1. "Mtume" (Hutcherson) – 8:24
B2. "Clockwork of the Spirits" (Cochran) 7:16

Bonus tracks on CD reissue (2008)

5. "Togo Land" (Cochran) – 15:42
6. "Jonathan" (Cochran) – 9:53
7. "Hey Harold" (Hutcherson) – 17:40

== Personnel ==
Musicians

- Bobby Hutcherson – vibes, marimba
- Todd Cochran – piano, arranger
- Oscar Brashear – trumpet, flugelhorn
- George Bohanon, Louis Spears – trombone
- Willie Ruff – French horn
- Fred Jackson, Jr. – piccolo
- Harold Land – tenor saxophone, flute
- Delbert Hill, Charles Owens, Herman Riley, Ernie Watts – reeds
- William Henderson – electric piano
- Reggie Johnson, James Leary III – bass
- Leon "Ndugu" Chancler, Nesbert "Stix" Hooper, Woody Theus – drums
- Warren Bryant – congas, bongos
- Donald Smith – vocals

Production

- George Butler – producer
- Rick Pekkoven – engineer
- Rudy Van Gelder – engineer (re-mix)
- Colman Andrews – liner notes
