= From the Depths of My Soul =

Studio album by Marlena Shaw
- Released: End of September 1973
- Recorded: May 30–31 and June 6, 1973
- Studios: A&R Studios, New York City
- Genre: Jazz
- Length: 38:36
- Labels: Blue Note; BN-LA143-F
- Producer: Dr. George Butler

Marlena Shaw chronology
Marlena (1972)	From the Depths of My Soul (1973)	Marlena Shaw Live at Montreux (1973)

From the Depths of My Soul is an album by American vocalist Marlena Shaw recorded in 1973 and released on the Blue Note label.

== Track listing ==
1. "Prelude / I Know I Love Him" (Bodie Chandler, Wade Marcus) - 3:11
2. "Hum This Song" (Carl Davis) - 3:08
3. "But For Now" (Bob Dorough) - 3:48
4. "Easy Evil" (Alan O'Day) - 3:39
5. "The Laughter and the Tears" (Randy Edelman) - 3:05
6. "The Feeling's Good" (Charles Fox, Norman Gimbel) - 3:55
7. "Wildflower" (David Richardson, Doug Edwards) - 4:04
8. "Just Don't Want To Be Lonely" (Bobby Eli, John C. Freeman Jr., Vinnie Barrett) - 3:41
9. "Waterfall" (Randy Edelman) - 3:45
10. "Say a Good Word" (Marlena Shaw) - 3:04
11. "Time For Me To Go" (Charles Fox, Norman Gimbel) - 3:16

- Recorded on May 30 (tracks 4–6, 8, 10 & 11) and May 31 (tracks 1–3, 7 & 9) with overdubbed strings recorded on June 6, 1973.

== Personnel ==
- Marlena Shaw - vocals
- Bianco - harp
- Derek Smith - piano, electric piano, clavinet
- Gene Bertoncini, Cornell Dupree, Carl Lynch, Hugh McCracken - guitar
- Ron Carter - double bass
- Wilbur Bascomb - electric bass
- Charles Collins, Herbie Lovelle, Grady Tate - drums
- Arthur Jenkins - conga
- George Devens, George Jenkins - percussion
- Wade Marcus - arranger, conductor
- Unidentified horns and strings
