= Wade Marcus =

American musician

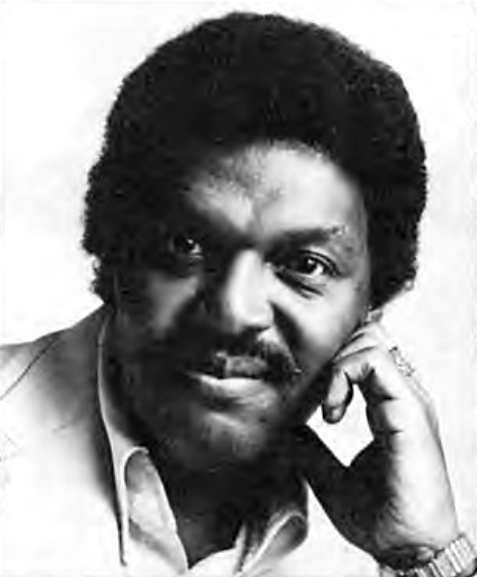
Marcus in a 1976 publicity photo

Wade Marcus was a music producer and arranger associated with the Motown sound during the 1970s. He composed the music to the film The Final Comedown with Grant Green. He also produced albums by The Blackbyrds, Gary Bartz, A Taste of Honey, The Sylvers, Eddie Kendricks, The Dramatics, Peaches & Herb, Donald Byrd, G. C. Cameron, Stevie Wonder and The Emotions.

== Discography ==
=== As leader ===
- A New Era (Cotillion, 1971)
- Metamorphosis (Impulse!, 1976)

=== As arranger ===
With Ron Carter

- Parade (Milestone, 1979)
- Super Strings (Milestone, 1981)

With Grant Green

- Shades of Green (Blue Note, 1972) – rec. 1971
- The Final Comedown (Blue Note, 1972) – rec. 1971

With Bobbi Humphrey

- Flute-In (Blue Note, 1971)
- Dig This! (Blue Note, 1972)

With Marlena Shaw

- Marlena (Blue Note, 1972)
- From the Depths of My Soul (Blue Note, 1973)

With others

- Brass Fever, Brass Fever (Impulse!, 1975)
- Horace Silver, Silver 'n Brass (Blue Note, 1975)
- Bo Diddley, Big Bad Bo (Chess, 1974)
- Ronnie Foster, Two Headed Freap (Blue Note, 1972)
- Bobby Hutcherson, Natural Illusions (Blue Note, 1972)
- Blue Mitchell, Stratosonic Nuances (RCA, 1975)
- Sonny Stitt, Satan (Cadet, 1974)
- Stanley Turrentine, Everybody Come On Out (Fantasy, 1976)
- Reuben Wilson, Set Us Free (Blue Note, 1971)
