= Satin Doll (Bobbi Humphrey album) =

Studio album by Bobbi Humphrey
- Released: December 1, 1974
- Recorded: July–September 1974
- Studio: Sound Factory, Hollywood, California
- Genre: Jazz
- Length: 43:56
- Label: Blue Note
- Producer: Larry Mizell

Bobbi Humphrey chronology
Live at Montreux (1973)	Satin Doll (1974)	Fancy Dancer (1975)

Satin Doll is the fourth studio album by American jazz flautist Bobbi Humphrey recorded in 1974 and released on the Blue Note label.

== Reception ==
Lea Antalin of DownBeat in a 1975 review called it "a disco album" and contemplated "if only there were more flute solos... perhaps next time around."

The AllMusic review by Andrew Hamilton awarded the album 3½ stars stating, "This album isn't as compelling as Blacks and Blues, but is far more impressive than the jazz fusion happening at the same time."

Professional ratings
Review scores
Source	Rating
AllMusic	3.5/5 stars
DownBeat	3.5/5 stars

== Track listing ==
All compositions by Larry Mizell except as indicated

1. "New York Times" – 6:53
2. "Satin Doll" (Duke Ellington, Johnny Mercer, Billy Strayhorn) – 4:09
3. "San Francisco Lights" (Chuck Davis) – 5:27
4. "Ladies Day" – 6:20
5. "Fun House" (Terry McFaddin, Melvin "Wah-Wah Watson" Ragin) – 4:43
6. "My Little Girl" – 6:45
7. "Rain Again" – 6:56
8. "You Are the Sunshine of My Life" (Stevie Wonder) – 2:43

- Recorded at The Sound Factory, Los Angeles, California on June 20 (tracks 2, 4, 6 & 8), July 22 (tracks 5 & 7) and August 5 (tracks 1 & 3), 1974

== Personnel ==
- Bobbi Humphrey – flute, vocals
- Fonce Mizell – arranger, conductor, clavinet, trumpet, vocals
- Larry Mizell – electric piano synthesizer, clavinet, vocals
- Jerry Peters – piano, clavinet
- Phil Davis, Don Preston – synthesizer
- Melvin "Wah Wah Watson" Ragin, John Rowin – guitar
- Wayne Tweed, Chuck Rainey – electric bass
- Harvey Mason – drums
- King Errison – conga
- Roger Sainte, Stephanie Spruill – percussion
- Chuck Davis, Samantha Harris, Freddie Perren – backing vocals
