= Fred Jackson Jr. =

American saxophonist

- Born: Los Angeles, California, U.S.
- Genre: Jazz
- Occupation: Musician
- Instruments: Saxophone, flute
- Years active: 1971–present

Fred Jackson Jr. is an American jazz fusion saxophonist and flautist who has recorded with Bobby Hutcherson, Earth, Wind & Fire, Jimmy Smith, Horace Silver, and Solomon Burke.

== Discography ==
=== As sideman ===
- Alice Coltrane, Eternity (Warner Bros., 1976)
- Andrae Crouch, Take Me Back (1975)
- Angela Bofill, Intuition (Capitol, 1988)
- B.B. King, King Size (ABC, 1977)
- Bill Cosby, Bill Cosby Is Not Himself These Days (Capitol, 1976)
- Billy Wright, Goin' Down Slow (Savoy, 1984)
- Bobby Hutcherson, Head On (Blue Note, 1971)
- Bobby Hutcherson, Montara (Blue Note, 1975)
- Boz Scaggs, Slow Dancer (Columbia, 1974)
- Carole King, Wrap Around Joy (Ode, 1974)
- Chuck Jackson, I Wanna Give You Some Love (EMI, 1980)
- Con Funk Shun, Spirit of Love (Mercury, 1980)
- Diane Schuur, Pure Schuur (GRP, 1991)
- Dynasty, Your Piece of the Rock (Solar, 1979)
- Earth, Wind & Fire, All 'n' All (Columbia, 1977)
- Earth, Wind & Fire, I Am (Columbia, 1979)
- Earth, Wind & Fire, Faces (Columbia, 1980)
- Edmund Sylvers, Have You Heard (Casablanca, 1980)
- Flora Purim, Nothing Will Be As It Was...Tomorrow (Warner Bros., 1977)
- Freda Payne, Supernatural High (Capitol, 1978)
- The Gap Band, The Gap Band (Mercury, 1979)
- Gene Harris, Nexus (Blue Note, 1975)
- Gladys Knight, Touch (Columbia, 1981)
- Grover Mitchell, Meet Grover Mitchell (Jazz Chronicles, 1979)
- Herbie Hancock, Sunlight (Columbia, 1978)
- Horace Silver, Silver 'n Wood (Blue Note, 1976)
- Jean Terrell, I Had to Fall in Love (A&M, 1978)
- Joe Sample, Rainbow Seeker (ABC, 1978)
- John Mayall, Moving On (Polydor, 1972)
- Jon Lucien, Premonition (Columbia, 1976)
- Lamont Dozier, Out Here On My Own (ABC, 1973)
- Lenny Williams, Spark of Love (ABC, 1978)
- Maria Muldaur, Sweet Harmony (Reprise, 1976)
- Marilyn McCoo & Billy Davis Jr., the Two of Us (ABC, 1977)
- Martha Reeves, We Meet Again (Fantasy, 1978)
- Mary Wells, In and Out of Love (Epic, 1981)
- Monk Higgins, Sheba Baby (Buddah 1975)
- The Mothers, The Grand Wazoo (Reprise, 1972)
- Miriam Makeba, A Promise (CBS 1974)
- Natalie Cole & Peabo Bryson, We're the Best of Friends (Capitol, 1979)
- Norman Connors, Romantic Journey (Buddah, 1977)
- Norman Connors, This Is Your Life (Arista, 1977)
- Rick James, Bustin' Out of L Seven (Gordy, 1979)
- Rick James, Throwin' Down (Gordy, 1982)
- Rockie Robbins, You and Me (A&M, 1980)
- Ry Cooder, Chicken Skin Music (Reprise, 1976)
- Shalamar, Three for Love (Solar, 1980)
- Shalamar, Big Fun (Solar, 1988)
- Sheena Easton, No Strings (MCA, 1993)
- Stevie Woods, The Woman in My Life (Ariola, 1982)
- Tavares, Love Uprising (Capitol, 1980)
- Tavares, Supercharged (Capitol, 1980)
- Terry Callier, Fire On Ice (Elektra, 1978)
- Vernon Burch, Steppin' Out (Chocolate City, 1980)
- Wade Marcus, Metamophosis (ABC, 1976)
- Webster Lewis, Let Me Be the One (Epic, 1981)
- The Whispers, Whisper in Your Ear (Solar, 1979)
- The Whispers, Imagination (Solar, 1980)
- The Whispers, Love Is Where You Find It (Solar, 1981)
- Willie Hutch, Foxy Brown (Motown, 1974)
