= On the Avenue (album) =

Studio album by Ronnie Foster
- Released: 1974
- Recorded: April 30 and May 1, 1974
- Studio: Electric Lady Studios, New York City
- Genre: Jazz
- Length: 34:30
- Label: Blue Note
- Producer: George Benson

Ronnie Foster chronology
Ronnie Foster Live: Cookin' with Blue Note at Montreux (1973)	On the Avenue (1974)	Cheshire Cat (1975)

On the Avenue is the third studio album by American organist Ronnie Foster recorded in 1974 and released on the Blue Note label.

== Reception ==
The Allmusic review by Jason Ankeny awarded the album 4½ stars and stated "Though not as relentlessly funky as his classic Blue Note debut Two Headed Freap, On the Avenue remains the most accomplished record of Ronnie Foster's career, proving commercial aspirations and accoutrements can indeed co-exist alongside traditional jazz sensibilities".

Professional ratings
Review scores
Source	Rating
Allmusic	4.5/5 stars

== Track listing ==
All tracks are written by Ronnie Foster except as noted.

No.	Title	Writer(s)	Length
1.	"Serenade to a Rock"		6:14
2.	"On the Avenue"		6:14
3.	"What Happened to the Sunshine"		5:01
4.	"Golden Lady"	Stevie Wonder	4:44
5.	"To See A Smile"		4:07
6.	"Big Farm Boy Goes to a Latin City"		3:36
7.	"First Light"	Freddie Hubbard	4:34

- Recorded at Electric Lady Studios in New York City on April 30 (tracks 1–3, 5 & 6) and May 1 (tracks 4 & 7), 1974

== Personnel ==
- Ronnie Foster – organ, clavinet, synthesizer, vocals
- John E. Gatchell, Dean Robert Pratt – trumpet, flugelhorn
- Gerald Ray Chamberlain – trombone
- Joel L. Kaye – baritone saxophone
- Phil Upchurch – guitar, electric bass
- Marvin Chappell – drums
- Ray Armando – percussion
- Alfred "Pee Wee" Ellis – horn arranger
