= Natural Illusions =

Studio album by Bobby Hutcherson
- Released: 1972
- Recorded: March 2–3, 1972
- Studio: Van Gelder Studio, Englewood Cliffs, NJ
- Genre: Jazz
- Length: 33:36
- Label: Blue Note; BST 84416
- Producer: George Butler

Bobby Hutcherson chronology
| Head On (1971) | Natural Illusions (1972) | Live at Montreux (1974) |

Natural Illusions is an album by American jazz vibraphonist Bobby Hutcherson recorded in 1972 and released on the Blue Note label.

== Reception ==
The Allmusic review by Stephen Thomas Erlewine awarded the album 1½ stars and stated "Natural Illusions is one of the rare Bobby Hutcherson dates that finds the vibraphonist flirting with the mainstream and fusion... There's little of the unpredictable phrasing and modal harmonies that distinguished Hutcherson's albums, and the music often sounds conventional, making it one of the lesser efforts in his catalog".

Professional ratings
Review scores
| Source | Rating |
|---|---|
| Allmusic | 1.5/5 stars |

== Track listing ==
All compositions by Bobby Hutcherson except where noted

1. "When You Are Near" - 3:56
2. "The Thrill Is Gone" (Rick Darnell, Roy Hawkins) - 4:23
3. "Sophisticated Lady" (Duke Ellington, Irving Mills, Mitchell Parish) - 6:02
4. "Rain Every Thursday" - 3:39
5. "The Folks Who Live On the Hill" (Oscar Hammerstein II, Jerome Kern) - 4:58
6. "Lush Life" (Billy Strayhorn) - 5:28
7. "Shirl" (Horace Silver) - 5:10

== Personnel ==
Musicians

- Bobby Hutcherson – vibes
- Wade Marcus – arranger
- Hank Jones – piano
- Gene Bertoncini – guitar
- George Duvivier, Ron Carter – bass
- Jack DeJohnette – drums
- Phil Bodner, Hubert Laws, Romeo Penque, Daniel Trimboli - flute
- George Marge – oboe
- John Leone – bassoon
- Eugene Bianco – harp
- Irving Spice, Aaron Rosand – violin
- Julian Barber, Seymour Berman – viola
- Seymour Barab – cello

Production

- George Butler – producer
- Rudy Van Gelder – engineer
