= Live at Montreux (Bobbi Humphrey album) =

Live album by Bobbi Humphrey
- Released: May 22, 1974
- Recorded: July 5, 1973
- Venue: Montreux Jazz Festival
- Genre: Jazz
- Length: 36:23
- Label: Blue Note
- Producer: George Butler

Bobbi Humphrey chronology
Blacks and Blues (1973)	Live at Montreux (1974)	Satin Doll (1974)

Live at Montreux is a live album by American flutist Bobbi Humphrey. It was recorded on July 5, 1973, at the Montreux Jazz Festival in Switzerland, and was released by Blue Note Records on May 22, 1974.

The album was one of five produced by Blue Note president George Butler of performances at the Montreux Jazz Festival in 1973.

== Critical reception ==
Leonard Feather described Humphrey's performance as "an astonishing display of fluency, good taste and self-confidence".

== Tracks ==
Track order and lengths sourced from Spotify.

Side One
No.	Title	Writer(s)	Length
1.	"Virtue"	Alphonse Mouzon	8:12
2.	"Sugar"	Stanley Turrentine	9:57

Side Two
No.	Title	Writer(s)	Length
3.	"Sad Bag"	Dick Griffin	9:55
4.	"Ain't No Sunshine"	Bill Withers	8:18
Total length:			36:23

== Personnel ==
- Bobbi Humphrey – flute
- Henry Franklin – bass
- Keith Killgo – drums
- Kevin Toney – Fender Rhodes, piano
- Barney Perry – guitar
- Jere Hausfater – liner notes
- Bob Cato – photography
- George Butler – producer

== See also ==
The four other albums of the "Cookin' with Blue Note at Montreux" series:

- Bobby Hutcherson Live at Montreux
- Live: Cookin' with Blue Note at Montreux
- Marlena Shaw Live at Montreux
- Ronnie Foster Live: Cookin' with Blue Note at Montreux
