= In and Out of Love =

In and Out of Love may refer to:

- In and Out of Love (Cheri Dennis album)
- In and Out of Love (Mary Wells album)
- "In and Out of Love" (Bon Jovi song)
- "In and Out of Love" (The Supremes song)
- "In and Out of Love" (Armin van Buuren song)
- In and Out of Love, an art installation by Damien Hirst
