= Fancy Dancer =

Studio album by Bobbi Humphrey
- Released: 1975
- Recorded: August 5–7, 1975
- Studio: Sound Factory, Hollywood, California
- Genre: Jazz-funk, jazz fusion
- Length: 39:52
- Label: Blue Note
- Producer: Larry Mizell, Chuck Davis

Bobbi Humphrey chronology
Satin Doll (1974)	Fancy Dancer (1975)	Tailor Made (1977)

Fancy Dancer is the fifth studio album by American jazz flautist Bobbi Humphrey, recorded in 1975 and released on the Blue Note label.

== Reception ==
The AllMusic review by Thom Jurek awarded the album 4 stars, stating: "There isn't anything approaching a middling moment here – this is all killer, no filler. Jazz critics may have had their troubles with this set, but no one cared; Humphrey and the Mizells were creating a new kind of largely instrumental funk that was inclusive of everything they could weave in from world music to soul-jazz to club music to pop – and the public responded".

Professional ratings
Review scores
Source	Rating
AllMusic	4/5 stars

== Track listing ==
1. "Uno Esta" (Larry Mizell) – 6:44
2. "The Trip" (Chuck Davis, Doug Jones) – 5:41
3. "You Make Me Feel So Good" (Larry Mizell, Fonce Mizell) – 6:16
4. "Fancy Dancer" (Jerry Peters) – 5:46
5. "Mestizo Eyes" (Larry Mizell, Fonce Mizell, Warren Jordan) 4:52
6. "Sweeter Than Sugar" (Chuck Davis, Skip Scarborough) – 4:24
7. "Please Set Me at Ease" (Larry Mizell, Fonce Mizell, Ruby Mizell) – 6:09
- Recorded at The Sound Factory, Los Angeles, California on August 5 (tracks 2–4 & 7), August 6 (tracks 1 & 5), and August 7 (track 6), 1975

== Personnel ==
- Bobbi Humphrey – flute, vocals
- Fonce Mizell – arranger, trumpet, clavinet, solina, vocals
- Larry Mizell – arranger, synthesizer, solina, piano, electric piano, vocals
- Oscar Brashear – trumpet
- Julian Priester – trombone
- Tyree Glenn Jr. – tenor saxophone
- Dorothy Ashby – harp
- Roger Glenn – vibes, marimba
- Chuck Davis – piano, electric piano
- Skip Scarborough – piano, electric piano, clavinet
- Jerry Peters – piano, electric piano, synthesizer
- Craig McMullen, John Rowin – guitar
- Chuck Rainey – electric bass
- Harvey Mason – drums
- Mayuto Correa – conga
- Jesse Acuna, Rosario Davila, Katherine Lyra, Augie Rey, Sonia Tavares – backing vocals
- James Carter – whistler

== In popular culture ==
Hip-hop artists Curren$y and Wiz Khalifa sampled the music from Fancy Dancer for their 2013 EP entitled Live in Concert.
