= (I Got No Kick Against) Modern Jazz =

Compilation album by Various artists
- Released: September 26, 1995
- Genre: Jazz
- Length: 71:36
- Label: GRP

(I Got No Kick Against) Modern Jazz is a 1995 tribute album by various jazz artists and bands from the GRP Records label. It consists of jazz cover versions of songs originally by The Beatles. The album's title comes from the lyrics of the Beatles's cover of the Chuck Berry song, "Rock and Roll Music", which was originally released on the studio album Beatles for Sale.

== Critical reaction ==
AllMusic found most of the tracks too similar to the originals, making it "predictable and quite forgettable". In contrast, BusinessWorld called it a "wonderful, delightful album" and praised it for mixing mainstream pop jazz with more adventurous sounds. The Record (New Jersey) called it "timeless music played with reverence and charm"; they also noted that all the guitarists on the record were far more skilled than George Harrison.

Chris Ingham praised Diana Krall's version of "And I Love Her", noting its "sultry approach" over "seven luxurious minutes" of music.

Dave Grusin was nominated for a Grammy for Best Pop Instrumental Performance for his cover of "Yesterday" on the album.

== Remixes ==
Groove Collective's "I Want You (She's So Heavy)" was released in a number of remixes for the dance floor in 1996.

== Track listing ==
All tracks are written by Lennon–McCartney, except where noted.

| No. | Title | Performing Artist | Length |
|---|---|---|---|
| 1. | "The Long and Winding Road" | George Benson |
| 2. | "She's Leaving Home" | McCoy Tyner |
| 3. | "I Want You (She's So Heavy)" | Groove Collective |
| 4. | "And I Love Her" | Diana Krall |
| 5. | "The Fool on the Hill" | Tom Scott |
| 6. | "Michelle" | Ramsey Lewis |
| 7. | "A Day in the Life" | Lee Ritenour |
| 8. | "Let It Be" | Nelson Rangell |
| 9. | "Eleanor Rigby" | Chick Corea |
| 10. | "While My Guitar Gently Weeps" (Harrison) | Russ Freeman |
| 11. | "In My Life" | Spyro Gyra |
| 12. | "Here, There and Everywhere" | David Benoit |
| 13. | "Blackbird" | Arturo Sandoval |
| 14. | "Yesterday" | Dave Grusin |
| 15. | "Imagine" | Yoshiko Kishino |
