= 20/20 (George Benson song) =

45rpm single by George Benson

from the album 20/20
- A-side: "20/20"
- B-side: "Shark Bite"
- Released: 1984
- Length: 4:05
- Label: Warner Bros. Records 7-29120
- Composer: (Randy Goodrum/Steve Kipner)
- Producer: Russ Titelman

US chronology
"Late at Night" (1984)	"20/20" (1984)	"I Just Wanna Hang Around You" (1985)

"20/20" is a 1984 single by George Benson. It was a hit for him in the United States and United Kingdom.

== Background ==
The song "20/20" was written by Randy Goodrum and Steve Kipner. Russ Titelman produced the song. The B side "Shark Bite" was produced by Tommy Lipuma. It was released on Warner Bros. 7–29120 in November 1984. It was the first single released from Benson's 20/20 album.

== Reception ==
The single was positively reviewed in the 8 December issue of Cash Box with the reviewer mentioning that Benson sang more aggressively than usual on this song. Producer Russ Titelman's production was said to be lush but not overblown. The prediction was that "20/20" should put Benson back to the top of all except the country charts.

The single received a positive review in the 15 December issue of Billboard with the reviewer calling it upbeat dance music with a sparking cheerful sound.

Benson's album 20/20 was reviewed in the 19 January 1985 issue of Cash Box. "20/20" and "Please Don’t Walk Away" were named as the album's best cuts.

== Airplay ==
As per the Billboard Hot Black Singles Radio Action page indicated for the week of 22 December, "20/20" had 37 new adds with a total of 58 to date.

As shown in the 15 December issue of Cash Box, "20/20" was at No. 2 on the Most Added Singles chart with adds at WDAS, WHUR, KGFJ, WNHC, WDRQ, WAOK, WGCI, WCIN. WLLE. WWDM, XHRM, KPRS and WHRK.

== Charts ==
The single debuted at No. 85 on the Billboard Hot 100 Singles chart for the week of 15 December. It debuted at No. 37 on the Billboard Hot Adult Contemporary chart for the week of 22 December. It also debuted at No. 58 on the Billboard Hot Black Singles chart.

The single reached No. 48 on Billboard Hot 100 chart and No. 15 on both the Adult Contemporary and R&B charts. It also reached No. 29 in the UK.
