= Sweet Revival =

Studio album by Ronnie Foster
- Released: 1973
- Recorded: December 14–15, 1972
- Studio: Generation Sound Studios, New York City
- Genre: Jazz
- Length: 45:01
- Label: Blue Note
- Producer: Horace Ott

Ronnie Foster chronology
Two Headed Freap (1972)	Sweet Revival (1973)	Ronnie Foster Live: Cookin' with Blue Note at Montreux (1973)

Sweet Revival is the second album by American organist Ronnie Foster recorded in 1972 and released on the Blue Note label.

== Reception ==
The Allmusic review by Stephen Thomas Erlewine awarded the album 4 stars and stated "Although the album sounds dated, the grooves are funky, and Sweet Revival remains one of the most engaging records of groovy, jazzy funk-soul of its era".

Professional ratings
Review scores
Source	Rating
Allmusic	4/5 stars

== Track listing ==
All tracks are written by Ronnie Foster except as noted.

No.	Title	Writer(s)	Length
1.	"Sweet Revival"	Joe Sample	3:52
2.	"Lisa's Love"		5:20
3.	"Back Stabbers"	Leon Huff, Gene McFadden, John Whitehead	3:20
4.	"Me and Mrs. Jones"	Kenny Gamble, Cary Gilbert, Leon Huff	4:23
5.	"Alone Again (Naturally)"	Gilbert O'Sullivan	4:05
6.	"Where Is the Love"	Ralph MacDonald, William Salter	5:26
7.	"Some Neck"		4:43
8.	"It's Just Gotta Be That Way"	Wayne Henderson	3:49
9.	"Superwoman"	Stevie Wonder	5:00
10.	"Inot"		5:03

== Personnel ==
- Ronnie Foster - organ
- Garnett Brown - trombone
- Seldon Powell - tenor saxophone
- Ernie Hayes - electric piano
- David Spinozza, John Tropea - electric guitar
- Wilbur Bascomb Jr. - electric bass
- Bernard Purdie - drums
- Horace Ott - arranger, conductor
- Unidentified percussion, horns, strings and female vocal group
