= Gigolo (Mary Wells song) =

Single by Mary Wells

from the album In and Out of Love
- Released: November 1981
- Recorded: 1981, Los Angeles
- Genre: Funk, funk-rap, post-disco
- Length: 5:20 (album version); 6:15 (extended dance remix); 4:16 (single release)
- Label: Epic; 14-02664
- Songwriters: Fonce Mizell; Larry Mizell
- Producer: Mizell Brothers

Mary Wells singles chronology
"If You Can't Give Her Love (Give Her Up)" (1974)	"Gigolo" (1981)	"These Arms" (1982)

"Gigolo" is a dance single written and produced by the Mizell Brothers and released by American singer Mary Wells on the Epic Records label. It was the former Motown star's first single with the CBS-operated label and brought Wells brief renewed success on the Billboard chart.

== Overview ==
=== Background ===
Mary Wells had been one of the earliest stars for Motown Records in the 1960s, scoring top ten crossover singles such as "The One Who Really Loves You", "You Beat Me to the Punch", "Two Lovers" and "My Guy" before leaving Motown after a dispute over monetary compensation by the label in March 1965. Wells would record singles for the labels 20th Century Fox, Atco, Jubilee and Reprise in the next nine years with various levels of success but never close to the heights of her early Motown stardom.

Wells, whose post-Motown career was mostly guided by her second husband, musician and songwriter Cecil Womack, continued to perform afterwards but wouldn't record for the next seven years. In between then, her marriage to Cecil Womack deteriorated and she ended up having an affair with Womack's brother Curtis, which led to Mary and Cecil divorcing in 1977.

After Will Porter signed on to be her musical director in 1978, following a show in San Francisco, Wells revived her flagging touring career and by 1981, had piqued the interest of Larkin Arnold, who was now an executive for CBS Records.

=== Recording ===
After presenting a full tape of demos, produced by Porter, Wells was offered a deal with CBS Records. It was decided that Wells' first CBS album would be released under the Epic subsidiary. Californian R&B producer Greg Perry was hired to produce most of the content of the In and Out of Love album, which had Wells record funk and post-disco songs as well as quiet storm material. Of the Perry songs, only "These Arms", which Wells had wished to be the first single release, was reminiscent of her 1960s heyday.

Arnold, however, wanted a stronger dance song to be produced as a way of reintroducing Wells to a record buying public that preferred dance music over Wells' trademark smooth soul Motown productions. He hired the Mizell Brothers (Fonce and Larry) to come up with the song. They would present the singer with "Gigolo", which had Wells sing in a forceful sound akin to her very first hit "Bye Bye Baby". The song also included the 38-year-old Wells rapping in some of the verses, inspired by Teena Marie's "Square Biz".

The song talks about a man who only loves a girl for one night before moving to the next woman. The narrator contends she knew that her lover "wasn't going to stay" but assures that the man was "such a gentleman" and trying to explain her affection saying "even Cinderella had her gigolo".

=== Commercial performance ===
Released in November 1981, the single generated buzz in disco clubs. The song became a hit with dance floor audiences, reaching number thirteen on the Billboard Disco Top 80 chart for the week of January 30, 1982, spending a total of 17 weeks on the chart.

It peaked at number sixty-nine on the Hot Soul Singles chart for the week of February 27, 1982. It became her first single to chart there since her rendition of brother-in-law Bobby Womack's "If You Can't Give Her Love (Give Her Up)" peaked at number 95 back in 1974 and her biggest hit since "Dig the Way I Feel" peaked at number 35 there. It was her 21st and final single to chart there as well as her final hit on any chart prior to her 1992 death.

Though the song wasn't a bigger hit as it was initially promoted to be, it motivated Wells to return to performing and recording full-time as she would until she was diagnosed with larynx cancer in 1990.

== Personnel ==
- Lead vocals by Mary Wells
- Background vocals by Brenda Gooch, Lynda Laurence and Maxine Green
- Rhythm Arrangements by Greg Perry & McKinley Jackson
- Bass - Rodney Mizell
- Horns - Fred Jackson, Jr., Ron Brown, George Bohanon, Nolan Smith Jr., Walter Johnson
- Guitar - Dwight Caroll
- Drums - Fonce Mizell
- Percussion - Kenny Hudson
- Keyboards & Synthesizer - Larry Mizell
- Producers - Fonce & Larry Mizell
