= Metamorphosis (Wade Marcus album) =

Studio album by Wade Marcus
- Released: 1976
- Studio: Devonshire, North Hollywood, California; Kendun Recorders, Burbank, California; ABC, Los Angeles, California
- Genre: Jazz
- Length: 41:41
- Label: ABC; Impulse!
- Producer: Esmond Edwards

Metamorphosis is an album by jazz arranger Wade Marcus, released in 1976 on ABC Records/Impulse! Records. The album peaked at number 38 on the Top Jazz Albums chart.

== Track listing ==
Side A
No.	Title	Writer(s)	Soloist(s)	Length
1.	"Metamorphosis"	Wade Marcus	Lee Ritenour; Joe Sample; Jerome Richardson; "Red" Holloway	8:50
2.	"Sugar Loaf Sunrise"	Esmond Edwards	Ritenour	4:00
3.	"Would You Like to Ride"	Marlo Henderson	Ritenour	3:58
4.	"Journey to Morocco"	Marcus	Richardson; Sample	5:59
Total length:				22:47

Side B
No.	Title	Writer(s)	Soloist(s)	Length
1.	"Poinciana"	Buddy Bernier; Nat Simon	Fred Jackson Jr.; Sample	7:00
2.	"Feelings"	Morris Albert	Warren Luening; Bill Green; Sample; Richardson	5:11
3.	"Funk Machine"	Henderson	Green	3:18
4.	"Daniel"	Elton John; Bernie Taupin	Buddy Collette; Dorothy Ashby	3:25
Total length:				18:54

== Personnel ==
Personnel as listed on the back cover.

- Joe Sample – keyboards
- Sonny Burke – keyboards
- Lee Ritenour – guitar
- Henry Davis – bass guitar
- Scott Edwards – bass guitar
- Chuck Domanico – acoustic bass guitar on "Metamorphosis"
- Harvey Mason – drums
- Bill Summers – percussion
- Gary Coleman – vibraphone
- "Red" Holloway – saxophone
- Fred Jackson, Jr. – reeds, woodwind
- Jerome Richardson – saxophone, clarinet, flute
- Buddy Collette – reeds, woodwind
- Bill Green – reeds, woodwind
- Warren Luening – trumpet, flugelhorn
- Britt Woodman – trombone
- Carl LaMagna – violin
- Marcia Van Dyke – violin
- Lya Stern – violin
- Karen Jones – violin
- Winterton Garvey – violin
- Haim Shtrum – violin
- Ken Yerke – violin
- Janice Gower – violin
- Assa Drori – violin
- William Henderson – violin
- Sheldon Sanov – violin
- Rollice Dale – viola
- David Campbell – viola
- Pamela Goldsmith – viola
- Denyse Buffum – viola
- Arthur Royval – viola
- Dennis Karmazyn – cello
- Selene Hurford – cello
- Ronald Cooper – cello
- David Speltz – cello
- Richard Feves – double bass
- Dorothy Ashby – harp
- Maxine Waters Willard – vocals
- Julia Waters Tillman – vocals
- Jessica Smith – vocals
- Oren Waters – vocals
- Luther Waters – vocals
- Wade Marcus – arranger, conductor
- Esmond Edwards – producer
- Charles Veal, Jr. – concertmaster
- Gregg Venable – recording engineer
- Barney Perkins – recording engineer, mixing engineer
- Tom Wilkes – art direction
- John L. Eastman – illustration

== Charts ==
Chart performance for Metamorphosis
Chart (1976)	Peak position
US Top Jazz Albums (Billboard)	38
