= 20/20 (George Benson album) =

Studio album by George Benson
- Released: January 7, 1985
- Recorded: 1984
- Studios: Amigo (North Hollywood); A&M (Hollywood); Atlantic (New York City); A&R (New York City); Automated Sound (New York); Grand Slam (New Jersey); Devonshire (North Hollywood); Village Recorders (Los Angeles); Bill Schnee (Hollywood); Rosebud Recording (New York); The Hit Factory (New York); Power Station (New York); Sigma Sound (New York); House of Music (Orange); The Review Room (New York)
- Genres: Smooth jazz; pop; R&B
- Length: 41:31
- Label: Warner Bros.
- Producers: Russ Titelman; Michael Masser; Daniel Sembello; Michael Sembello

George Benson chronology
Pacific Fire (1983)	20/20 (1985)	While the City Sleeps... (1986)

Singles from 20/20
- 1. "20/20" Released: 1984; 2. "No One Emotion (remix)" Released: 1985; 3. "Beyond the Sea (song)" Released: 1985; 4. "I Just Wanna Hang Around You" Released: 1985; 5. "I Just Wanna Hang Around You" Released: 1985

Professional ratings
Review scores
Source	Rating
AllMusic	1.5/5 stars

20/20 is a studio album by George Benson, released on the Warner Bros. record label in 1985. The lead single by the same name reached #48 on the Billboard Hot 100. The album was certified Gold by the RIAA. "You Are the Love of My Life" is a duet with Roberta Flack. It was one of a number of songs used for Eden Capwell and Cruz Castillo on the American soap opera Santa Barbara. Also included on 20/20 is the original version of the song "Nothing's Gonna Change My Love for You" which would later become a smash hit for Hawaiian singer Glenn Medeiros.

Songwriters on the album include: Clif Magness, Mark Mueller, Tom Keane, James Newton Howard, Steve Lukather, Cruz Sembello, Daniel Sembello, Jon Sembello, Michael Sembello, Michael Masser, Gerry Goffin, Charles Trenet, Jack Lawrence, Cecil Womack, Linda Womack, Randy Goodrum, Steve Kipner, Neil Larsen, and Linda Creed.

== Track listing ==
No.	Title	Writer(s)	Producer(s)	Length
1.	"No One Emotion"	Clif Magness, Mark Mueller, Tom Keane	Russ Titelman	3:55
2.	"Please Don't Walk Away"	James Newton Howard, Steve Lukather	Titelman	3:51
3.	"I Just Wanna Hang Around You"	Cruz Sembello, Daniel Sembello, Jon Sembello, Michael Sembello	Titelman	4:41
4.	"Nothing's Gonna Change My Love for You"	Michael Masser, Gerry Goffin	Michael Masser	4:04
5.	"Beyond the Sea (La Mer)"	Charles Trenet, Jack Lawrence	Titelman	4:10
6.	"20/20"	Randy Goodrum, Steve Kipner	Titelman	4:07
7.	"New Day"	Cecil Womack, Linda Womack	Titelman	4:27
8.	"Hold Me"	Michael Sembello, Daniel Sembello	Michael Sembello; Daniel Sembello	4:02
9.	"Stand Up"	Neil Larsen	Titelman	5:07
10.	"You Are the Love of My Life"	Linda Creed, Michael Masser	Masser	2:50

== Personnel ==
Musicians

- George Benson – lead vocals (1–8, 10), guitar (2, 9), guitar solo (4–8), harmony vocals (8)
- Wells Christie – Synclavier programming (all tracks)
- Randy Waldman – keyboards (1), synthesizers (3), additional synthesizers (6)
- James Newton Howard – acoustic piano (2), synthesizers (2, 5)
- Clifford Carter – additional synthesizers (2, 8), drum machine programming (2, 7), synthesizers (5), keyboards (7)
- Rob Mounsey – Synclavier (2, 6, 8, 9), vocoder (2), synthesizer bass (9)
- Richard Tee – Fender Rhodes (2), synthesizer bass (8, 9)
- Daniel Sembello – DX7 Rhodes (3), synthesizer bass (3), synthesizers (8), drum machine programming (8), ride cymbal (8)
- Robbie Buchanan – keyboards (4), synthesizer programming (4)
- Joe Sample – acoustic piano (5)
- Randy Goodrum – synthesizer programming (6), Oberheim DMX (6), Oberheim DSX sequencer programming (6)
- Barnaby Finch – DX7 Rhodes (9)
- Dave Grusin – string synthesizer (9), flute (9)
- Neil Larsen – synthesizers (9)
- Randy Kerber – keyboards (10)
- Michael Sembello – rhythm guitar (1, 8), guitar solo (1, 8), drum machine programming (3, 8), backing vocals (3, 8)
- Dann Huff – guitar (4)
- Paul Jackson, Jr. – guitar (4, 10)
- Freddie Green – rhythm guitar (5)
- Cecil Womack – guitars (7), backing vocals (7)
- David Williams – rhythm guitar (9)
- Marcus Miller – bass guitar (2)
- Nathan East – bass guitar (4)
- Earl May – bass guitar (5)
- Anthony Jackson – bass guitar (7)
- Neil Stubenhaus – bass guitar (10)
- Clif Magness – drum machine programming (1)
- Russ Titelman – drum machine programming (1)
- Steve Ferrone – additional drums (1)
- Dave Weckl – additional drums (1), additional cymbals (6)
- Bryan Lee Janszen – Simmons drum programming (3, 8)
- Carlos Vega – drums (4)
- John Robinson – drums (5, 9)
- Steve Kipner – Oberheim DMX (6), Oberheim DSX sequencer programming (6)
- Rick Shlosser – drums (10)
- Paulinho da Costa – percussion (1, 3, 6, 9)
- Errol "Crusher" Bennett – finger cymbals (7)
- Ralph MacDonald – triangle (7), percussion (8)
- Gary Herbig – saxophones (1)
- Kim Hutchcroft – saxophones (1)
- Gary Grant – trumpet (1)
- Jerry Hey – trumpet (1)
- George Young – flute (7)
- Patti Austin – backing vocals (1, 6), additional backing vocals (3), harmony vocals (6)
- Gordon Grody – backing vocals (1)
- Lani Groves – backing vocals (1)
- Richard Marx – backing vocals (4)
- Deborah Thomas – backing vocals (4, 10)
- James "JT" Taylor – backing and harmony vocals (6)
- Linda Womack – backing vocals (7)
- Roberta Flack – lead vocals (10)
- David Cochrane – backing vocals (10)
- Darryl Phinnessee – backing vocals (10)

Brass section on "Beyond the Sea (La Mer)"

- Frank Wess and Charles Williams – alto saxophone
- Robert Eldridge – baritone saxophone
- George Coleman and Jimmy Heath – tenor saxophone
- Dave Taylor – bass trombone
- Robin Eubanks, Slide Hampton, and Benny Powell – trombone
- Jon Faddis, Earl Gardner, Joe Newman, Lew Soloff and Felix Vega – trumpet

Music arrangements

- Jerry Hey – horn arrangements (1)
- Clif Magness – track arrangements (1)
- Russ Titelman – track arrangements (1)
- Randy Waldman – track arrangements (1)
- James Newton Howard – string arrangements (2)
- Robbie Buchanan – arrangements (4)
- Ralph Burns – string arrangements and conductor (5, 7)
- Frank Foster – horn arrangements and conductor (5)
- Michael Masser – rhythm track arrangements (10)
- Gene Page – rhythm track and string arrangements (10)

== Production ==
- Russ Titelman – executive producer
- Mary Melia – production coordinator
- Simon Levy – art direction
- Kav Deluxe – design
- Richard Bomersheim – photography
- Bill Whitten – styling
- Fritz & Turner Management – management

Technical credits

- Ted Jensen – mastering at Sterling Sound (New York, NY)
- Jim Boyer – engineer, mixing
- Lee Herschberg – engineer
- Gary Ladinsky – engineer
- Michael Mancini – engineer
- Ed Rak – mixing
- Elliot Scheiner – engineer, mixing
- Russell Schmitt – engineer
- Russ Titelman – mixing
- Thom Wilson – engineer
- Bill Schnee – mixing (4, 10)
- Dick Bogert – additional engineer
- Kendall Brown – additional engineer
- Dean Burt – additional engineer
- John Convertino – additional engineer
- Jim Gallagher – additional engineer
- Josiah Gluck – additional engineer
- Cliff Hodsdon – additional engineer
- John Rollo – additional engineer
- Nick Spigel – additional engineer
- Michael Abbott – assistant engineer
- Mike Allaire – assistant engineer
- Nelson Ayers – assistant engineer
- Mike Birnholz – assistant engineer
- Paul Brown – assistant engineer
- Ollie Cotton – assistant engineer
- Nick Delre – assistant engineer
- Paul Higgins – assistant engineer
- Steve Hirsch – assistant engineer
- Barbara Ivone – assistant engineer
- Cliff Jones – assistant engineer
- Leslie Klein – assistant engineer
- Robin Laine – assistant engineer
- Bruce Lampcov – assistant engineer
- James Nichols – assistant engineer
- Bobby Warner – assistant engineer
- Jay Willis – assistant engineer

== Charts ==
=== Weekly charts ===
Chart (1985)	Peak position
Austrian Albums (Ö3 Austria)	29
Dutch Albums (Album Top 100)	17
German Albums (Offizielle Top 100)	40
Norwegian Albums (VG-lista)	9
Swedish Albums (Sverigetopplistan)	18
Swiss Albums (Schweizer Hitparade)	24
UK Albums (Official Charts)	9
US Billboard 200	45
US Top R&B/Hip-Hop Albums (Billboard)	20

=== Year-end charts ===
Chart (1985)	Position
US Top R&B/Hip-Hop Albums (Billboard)	41

== Certifications ==
Region	Certification	Certified units/sales
Japan	—	53,700
United Kingdom (BPI)	Gold	100,000^{^}
United States (RIAA)	Gold	500,000^{^}
^{^} Shipments figures based on certification alone.
