= In Flight (George Benson album) =

Studio album by George Benson
- Released: February 4, 1977
- Recorded: August – November, 1976
- Studios: Capitol Studios (Hollywood, California)
- Genre: Jazz
- Length: 51:29
- Label: Warner Bros.
- Producer: Tommy LiPuma

George Benson chronology
Breezin' (1976)	In Flight (1977)	Weekend in L.A. (1978)

Singles from In Flight
- 1. "The World Is a Ghetto" Released: 1977; 2. "Nature Boy" Released: 1977; 3. "Everything Must Change" Released: 1977; 4. "Gonna Love You More" Released: 1977

Professional ratings
Review scores
Source	Rating
AllMusic	3/5 stars
Christgau's Record Guide	C+
The Penguin Guide to Jazz Recordings	2/4 stars
The Rolling Stone Jazz Record Guide	3/5 stars

In Flight is a 1977 studio album by George Benson, released on the Warner Bros. Records label. It was certified Platinum by the RIAA.

== Track listing ==
No.	Title	Writer(s)	Length
1.	"Nature Boy"	Eden Ahbez	5:58
2.	"The Wind and I"	Ronnie Foster	5:04
3.	"The World Is a Ghetto"	B.B. Dickerson, Charles Miller, Harold Brown, Howard Scott, Lee Oskar, Lonnie Jordan, Papa Dee Allen	9:41
4.	"Gonna Love You More"	Morris Albert	4:37
5.	"Valdez in the Country"	Donny Hathaway	4:29
6.	"Everything Must Change"	Benard Ighner	8:07

The Deluxe Edition bonus tracks
No.	Title	Writer(s)	Length
7.	"The World Is a Ghetto" (12" Disco Mix)	B.B. Dickerson, Charles Miller, Harold Brown, Howard Scott, Lee Oskar, Lonnie Jordan, Papa Dee Allen
8.	"Everything Must Change" (45 RPM Edit)	Benard Ighner

== Personnel ==
Adapted from liner notes

- George Benson – vocals, lead guitar
- Jorge Dalto – clavinet, acoustic piano
- Ronnie Foster – electric piano, Minimoog
- Phil Upchurch – rhythm guitar, bass (5, 6)
- Stanley Banks – bass (1–4)
- Harvey Mason – drums
- Ralph MacDonald – percussion
- Claus Ogerman – orchestra arrangements and conductor

== Production ==
- Tommy LiPuma – producer
- Al Schmitt – recording, mixing
- Don Henderson – assistant engineer
- Doug Sax – mastering at The Mastering Lab (Hollywood, California)
- Noel Newbolt – production assistant
- Mike Doud – art direction, design
- Antonin Kratochvil – photography
- Ken Veeder – photography (musicians)
- Michael Manoogian – lettering

== Certifications ==
Region	Certification	Certified units/sales
Japan	—	24,320
United Kingdom (BPI)	Silver	60,000^{^}
United States (RIAA)	Platinum	1,000,000^{^}
^{^} Shipments figures based on certification alone.
