= Cheshire Cat (Ronnie Foster album) =

Studio album by Ronnie Foster
- Released: 1975
- Recorded: March 21, 24, 25 & 27, 1975
- Studio: A&R Studios, New York City
- Genre: Jazz
- Label: Blue Note
- Producer: George Benson

Ronnie Foster chronology
On the Avenue (1974)	Cheshire Cat (1975)	Love Satellite (1978)

Cheshire Cat is the fourth studio album by American organist Ronnie Foster recorded in 1975 and released on the Blue Note label.

== Reception ==
The Allmusic review by Jason Ankeny awarded the album 4 stars and stated "Few records that fall into the soul-jazz genre balance both sides of the equation so carefully or so deftly".

Professional ratings
Review scores
Source	Rating
Allmusic	4/5 stars

== Track listing ==
All compositions by Ronnie Foster except as indicated

1. "Like a Child" – 4:57
2. "Tuesday Heartbreak" (Stevie Wonder) – 4:47
3. "Fly Away" – 6:18
4. "Funky Motion" – 8:13
5. "Heartless" – 8:10
6. "Cheshire Cat" – 3:45
- Recorded at A&R Studios in New York City on March 21 (tracks 1 & 4), March 24, 1975 (tracks 5 & 6), March 25, 1975 (track 2), and March 27 (track 3), 1975.

== Personnel ==
- Ronnie Foster – organ, keyboards, vocals
- Joe Beck – guitar
- George Benson – guitar, backing vocals
- William Allen – bass
- Gary King – electric bass
- Dennis Davis – drums
- Mtume – conga, percussion
