= Ruth Brown '65 =

Live album by Ruth Brown
- Released: 1966
- Recorded: December 1964
- Genre: Jazz
- Labels: Mainstream; 56034/S6034
- Producer: Bob Shad

Ruth Brown chronology
Gospel Time (1962)	Ruth Brown '65 (1966)	The Big Band Sound of Thad Jones/Mel Lewis featuring Miss Ruth Brown (1965)

Ruth Brown '65 (re-released as Softly) is an album released by vocalist Ruth Brown featuring tracks recorded in 1964 and originally released on the Mainstream label.

== Reception ==
Professional ratings
Review scores
Source	Rating
Allmusic	3/5 stars

Allmusic awarded the album 3 stars and calling it "an underrated, nicely produced mid-'60s album".

== Track listing ==
1. "On the Good Ship Lollipop" (Richard A. Whiting, Sidney Clare) – 2:57
2. "Help a Good Girl Go Bad" (Alan Brandt, Bob Haymes) – 2:49
3. "He's a Real Gone Guy" (Nellie Lutcher) – 2:55
4. "Porgy" (Jimmy McHugh, Dorothy Fields) – 3:00
5. "What Am I Looking For" (George Devens) – 2:29
6. "Here's That Rainy Day" (Jimmy Van Heusen, Johnny Burke) – 2:47
7. "Hurry On Down" (Lutcher) – 2:39
8. "Table for Two" (Kenny Rankin, Ruth Batchelor) – 2:56
9. "What Do You Know (Que Sabes Tu)" (Billy Vaughn, Myrta Silva) – 2:59
10. "Whispering Grass" (Fred Fisher, Doris Fisher) – 2:48
11. "Watch It" (Dick Hyman) – 2:57
12. "I Know Why" (Harry Warren, Mack Gordon) – 2:52

== Personnel ==
- Ruth Brown – vocal
- Clark Terry, James Maxwell, Jimmy Sedlar – trumpet
- Urbie Green, John Messner, Tony Studd, Britt Woodman – trombone
- Ray Alonge, Richard Berg – French horn
- Phil Bodner, Shelly Gold, John Hafer – oboe, clarinet, flute, alto saxophone, alto flute, piccolo, tenor saxophone
- Sir Roland Hanna, Hank Jones – piano
- Bianco – harp
- Ariana Bronne, Fred Buldrini, Winston Collymore, Bernard Eichen, Lewis Eley, Leo Kruczek, Walter Malignaggi, Gerard Molfese, Elvira Morgenstern, Marvin Morgenstern, David Nadien, George Ockner, Raoul Poliakin, Michael Spivakowsky, Jack Zayde, Anthony Zungola – violin
- David Markowitz, David Schwartz, Emanuel Vardi, Harry Zaratzian – viola
- Allan Goldberg, Charles McCracken, George Ricci – cello
- Barry Galbraith – guitar, electric guitar, electric bass
- Richard Davis – bass
- Archie Freeman – drums
- Doug Allen, George Devens – percussion
- Peter Matz – arranger, conductor
