= On Broadway (song) =

1963 single by The Drifters

Single by The Drifters

from the album Under the Boardwalk
- B-side: "Let the Music Play"
- Released: March 1963
- Genre: Soul
- Length: 3:05
- Label: Atlantic
- Songwriters: Barry Mann, Cynthia Weil, Jerry Leiber and Mike Stoller

The Drifters singles chronology
"Up on the Roof" (1962)	"On Broadway" (1963)	"Rat Race" (1963)

"On Broadway"

Single by George Benson

from the album Weekend in L.A.
- B-side: "We As Love"
- Released: March 1978
- Genre: Jazz; soul
- Length: 5:15 (single version); 10:06 (album version)
- Label: Warner Bros.
- Songwriters: Barry Mann; Cynthia Weil; Jerry Leiber; Mike Stoller
- Producer: Tommy LiPuma

George Benson singles chronology
"The Greatest Love of All" (1977)	"On Broadway" (1978)	"Lady Blue" (1978)

"On Broadway" is a song written by Barry Mann and Cynthia Weil in collaboration with the team of Jerry Leiber and Mike Stoller.

== Composition ==
Weil and Mann were based at Aldon Music, located at 1650 Broadway, New York City, and the song as written by Mann/Weil was originally recorded by the Cookies (although the Crystals' version beat them to release) and featured an upbeat lyric in which the protagonist is still on her way to Broadway and sings "I got to get there soon, or I'll just die". The song was played as a shuffle.

When Leiber/Stoller let it be known that the Drifters had booked studio time for the following day and were a song short, Mann/Weil forwarded "On Broadway". Leiber and Stoller liked the song but felt that it was not quite right; the four held an overnight brainstorming session that culminated in the better-known version, now with a rock-oriented groove and with a more bluesy feel, which matched the new lyric in which the singer was now actually on Broadway and having a hard time.

== The Drifters version ==
A young Phil Spector played the distinctive lead guitar solo on the Drifters' recording. The personnel for the Drifters recording were Rudy Lewis – lead vocals; Joe Newman, Ernie Royal – trumpets; Billy Butler, Bill Suyker, Everett Barksdale – guitars; Russ Savakus – bass; Gary Chester – drums; and Phil Kraus, Nick Rodriguez, Martin Grupp – percussion. The arranger was Garry Sherman.

The recording by the Drifters was a hit, reaching No. 9 on the Billboard Hot 100 in 1963. Cash Box described it as "a haunting, slow beat cha cha opus...that sports a first rate Garry Sherman arrangement."

The Drifters' version was featured in a 1971 television public service announcement for Radio Free Europe (RFE). The Hungarian expatriate announcer is shown entering the RFE studio announcing "On Broadway", after which young Hungarians are shown listening to the "In sound from Outside".

In 2013, the 1963 recording of the song by the Drifters on Atlantic Records was inducted into the Grammy Hall of Fame.

== George Benson version ==
George Benson's version of "On Broadway", from his 1978 album Weekend in L.A., hit No. 7 on the Billboard Hot 100 and No. 2 on the Soul chart. Benson's take also has had substantial adult contemporary and smooth jazz radio airplay ever since. It won a Grammy Award for Best R&B Vocal Performance. Benson's version also appears on the All That Jazz soundtrack and is played during the opening scene of the Bob Fosse-directed movie loosely based on Fosse's life.

== Other notable versions ==
- Clem Curtis & the Foundations recorded a version that was released on the IDM label. Charting in the UK, it debuted in the IPA Airplay Top 10 on September 1, 1984 at No. 3 and was at No. 5 on the 29th later the same month.
- Gary Numan included a version of this song on the 1998 expanded version of his live album Living Ornaments '79, notable for Billy Currie's ARP Odyssey solo.
- The Genesis song The Lamb Lies Down on Broadway interpolates some parts of the song.
