= Weekend in L.A. =

Live album by George Benson
- Released: 1978
- Recorded: September 30–October 2, 1977
- Venues: The Roxy Theatre, West Hollywood, California
- Genres: Jazz, R&B
- Length: 67:36
- Label: Warner Bros.
- Producer: Tommy LiPuma

George Benson chronology
In Flight (1977)	Weekend in L.A. (1978)	Space (1978)

Singles from Weekend in L.A.
- 1. "On Broadway" Released: 1978; 2. "Lady Blue" Released: 1978

Professional ratings
Review scores
Source	Rating
Allmusic	4/5 stars
The Rolling Stone Jazz Record Guide	3/5 stars

Weekend in L.A. is a 1978 live album by jazz/soul guitarist George Benson. The album was recorded live at the Roxy Theatre in West Hollywood, California. It was certified Platinum by the RIAA.

== Track listing ==
1. "Weekend in L.A." (George Benson) – 7:28
2. "On Broadway" (Jerry Leiber, Barry Mann, Mike Stoller, Cynthia Weil) – 10:07
3. "Down Here on the Ground" (Gale Garnett, Lalo Schifrin) – 4:54
4. "California P.M." (Benson) – 7:04
5. "The Greatest Love of All" (Linda Creed, Michael Masser) – 5:43
6. "It's All in the Game" (Charles G. Dawes, Carl Sigman) – 3:54
7. "Windsong" (Neil Larsen) – 6:13
8. "Ode to a Kudu" (Benson) – 7:25
9. "Lady Blue" (Leon Russell) – 3:39
10. "We All Remember Wes" (Stevie Wonder) – 5:47
11. "We as Love" (Ronnie Foster) – 7:05

== Personnel ==
- George Benson – lead guitar, vocals
- Phil Upchurch – rhythm guitar
- Jorge Dalto – acoustic piano, keyboards
- Ronnie Foster – synthesizers
- Stanley Banks – bass
- Harvey Mason – drums
- Ralph MacDonald – percussion
- Nick DeCaro – additional string ensemble arrangements

Production

- Tommy LiPuma – producer
- Noel Newbolt – production assistant
- Al Schmitt – recording, mixing
- Don Henderson – assistant engineer
- Doug Sax – mastering at The Mastering Lab (Hollywood, California).
- John Calbalka – art direction
- Brad Kanawyer – design
- Charles DiBona – lettering
- Tom Bert – cover and inner spread photography
- Jim McCrary – back cover photography
- Fred Valentine – musicians insert photography

== Charts ==
=== Weekly charts ===
Chart (1978)	Peak position
Canada Top Albums/CDs (RPM)	4
New Zealand Albums (RMNZ)	8
UK Albums (Official Charts)	47
US Billboard 200	5
US Top R&B/Hip-Hop Albums (Billboard)	1

=== Year-end charts ===
Chart (1978)	Position
Canada Top Albums/CDs (RPM)	27
New Zealand Albums (RMNZ)	45
US Billboard 200	26

== Certifications ==
Region	Certification	Certified units/sales
United Kingdom (BPI)	Silver	60,000^{^}
United States (RIAA)	Platinum	1,000,000^{^}
^{^} Shipments figures based on certification alone.

== See also ==
- List of number-one R&B albums of 1978 (U.S.)
