= Montreux Jazz Festival =

Music festival in Switzerland

Coordinates: 46°26′20″N 6°54′16″E

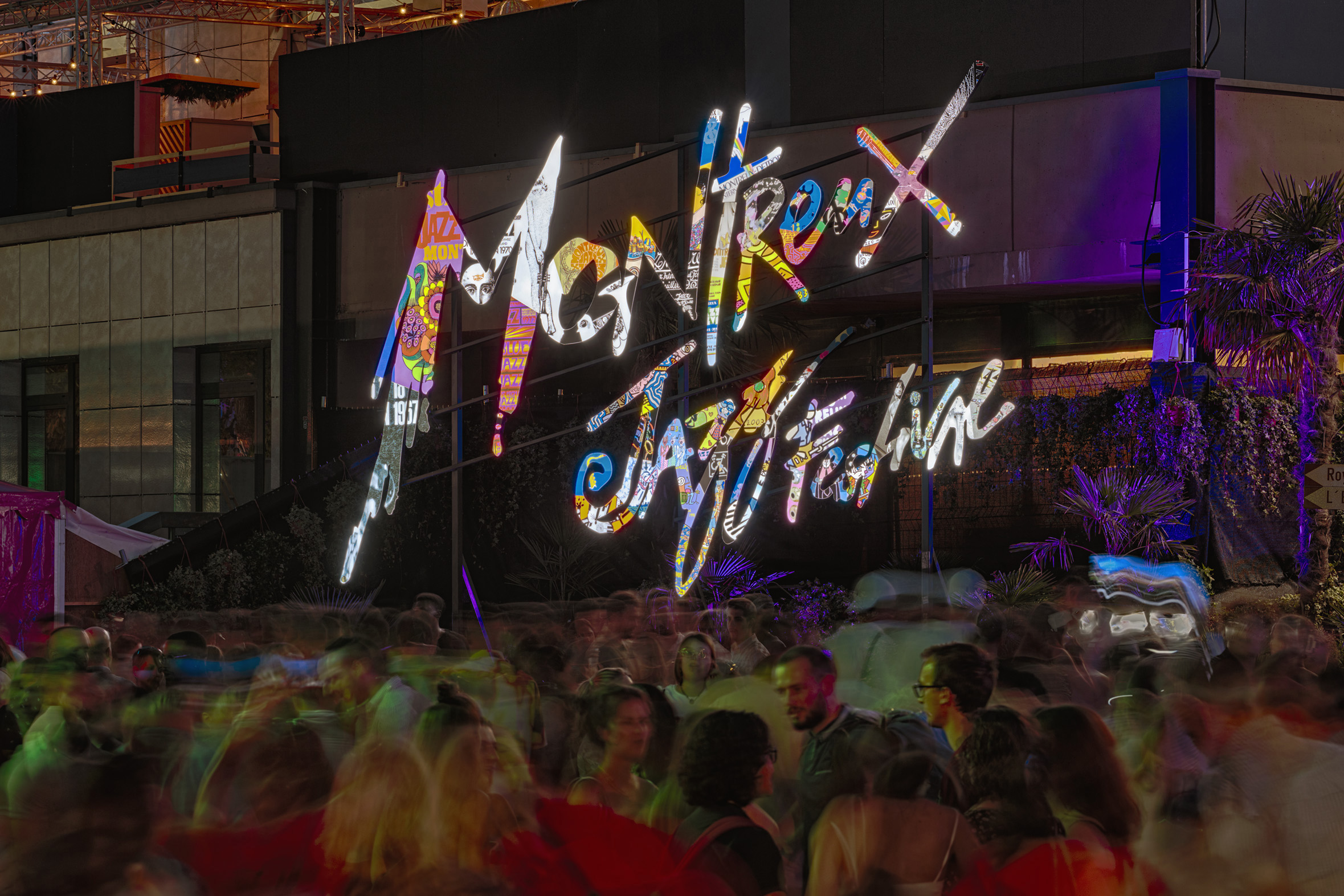
- Official logo by Jean Tinguely (poster 1982) reinterpreted by Giovanni Riva for the 50th anniversary of the festival in 2016
- Genre: Jazz, rock, pop
- Dates: First fortnight of July
- Locations: Montreux Convention Centre; Grand-Rue 95; 1820 Montreux; Switzerland
- Years active: 1967–present
- Website: montreuxjazzfestival.com

The Montreux Jazz Festival (formerly Festival de Jazz Montreux and Festival International de Jazz Montreux) is a music festival in Switzerland, held annually in early July in Montreux on the Lake Geneva shoreline. It is the second-largest annual jazz festival in the world after Canada's Montreal International Jazz Festival.

Initiator and head organizer Claude Nobs brought an array of artists to Montreux. Mathieu Jaton has organised the festival since Nobs' death in 2013.

== History ==
The Montreux Jazz Festival opened was founded in 1967 by Claude Nobs, Géo Voumard and René Langel with considerable help from Ahmet and Nesuhi Ertegun of Atlantic Records. The festival was first held at Montreux Casino. The driving force is the tourism office under the direction of Raymond Jaussi. It lasted for three days and featured almost exclusively jazz artists. The highlights of this era were Charles Lloyd, Miles Davis, Keith Jarrett, Jack DeJohnette, Bill Evans, Soft Machine, Weather Report, The Fourth Way, Nina Simone, Jan Garbarek, and Ella Fitzgerald.

Montreux Jazz Festival 1983 poster designed by Keith Haring

Originally a pure jazz festival, it opened up in the 1970s and today presents artists working in various styles of music (hip-hop, rap, funk, disco). Jazz remains an important part of the festival. Part of the festival's expansion was due to coproduction by Quincy Jones, who brought many international artists in the early 1990s. Today's festival lasts about two weeks and attracts an audience of more than 200,000 people.

In the 1970s, the festival began broadening its scope, including blues, soul, and rock artists; for instance, Led Zeppelin, Pink Floyd, Frank Zappa, Deep Purple, Canned Heat and many others. Towards the end of the decade, the festival expanded even more, including music from all continents (with an emphasis on Brazilian music) and lasting a full three weeks. Santana came to Montreux for the first time in 1970; Van Morrison played in 1974 and 1980. The Dubliners played there on the festival in 1976. Other artists included B.B. King, Stevie Ray Vaughan, Gary Moore, Weather Report, Don Ellis, Crossfire, Buddy Guy, Camarón de la Isla and Tomatito, Soft Machine, Chuck Berry, Peter Tosh, George Clinton and Parliament-Funkadelic, Eric Clapton, Luther Allison, Bo Diddley, Stan Getz, Airto Moreira, Joe Henderson, Dizzy Gillespie, Oscar Peterson, Ney Matogrosso, Charles Mingus, Etta James, Sonny Rollins, Son House, Count Basie, Chick Corea, Herbie Hancock, Gilberto Gil, Ray Charles, James Booker, Hermeto Pascoal, Mahavishnu Orchestra, Rory Gallagher, Marianne Faithfull, Elis Regina, Les McCann, Eddie Harris, Pasadena Roof Orchestra, New Order, Jaco Pastorius, Ringo Starr & His All-Starr Band, Toto, Zucchero Fornaciari, André Geraissati, Korni Grupa, Jan Akkerman, Joe Satriani, Status Quo, Prince, and many more.

Since 1967, the festival has allowed a Swiss or international artist to design the official poster every year. Swiss artist Pierre Keller was an art consultant to the festival. Keller recruited artists such as Jean Tinguely, Keith Haring, Niki de Saint Phalle, Shigeo Fukuda, and Andy Warhol to create artwork for the festival in the 1980s.

== Venue ==
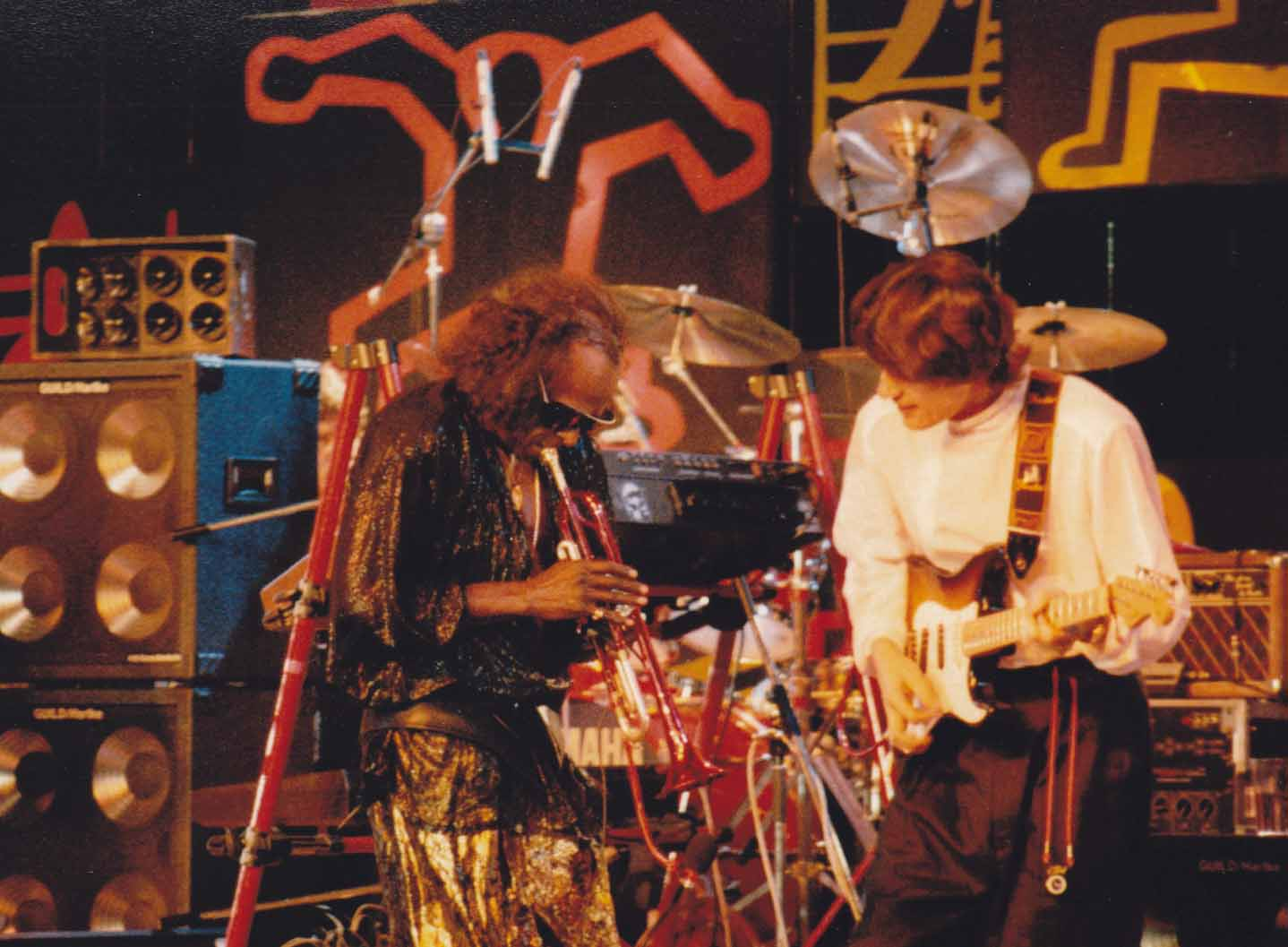
Miles Davis and Robben Ford at the Montreux Jazz Festival 1986

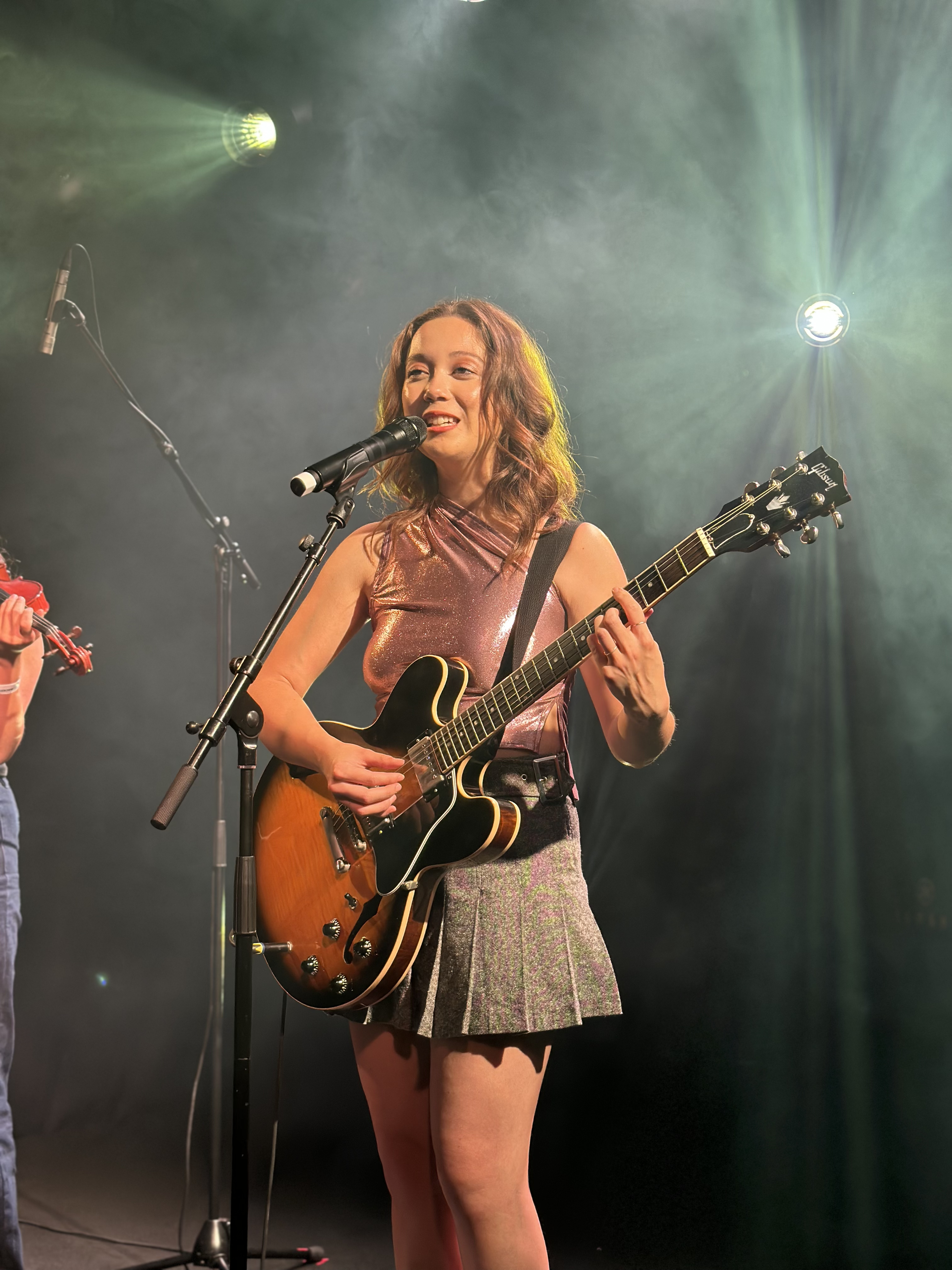
Laufey at the Montreux Jazz Festival 2023

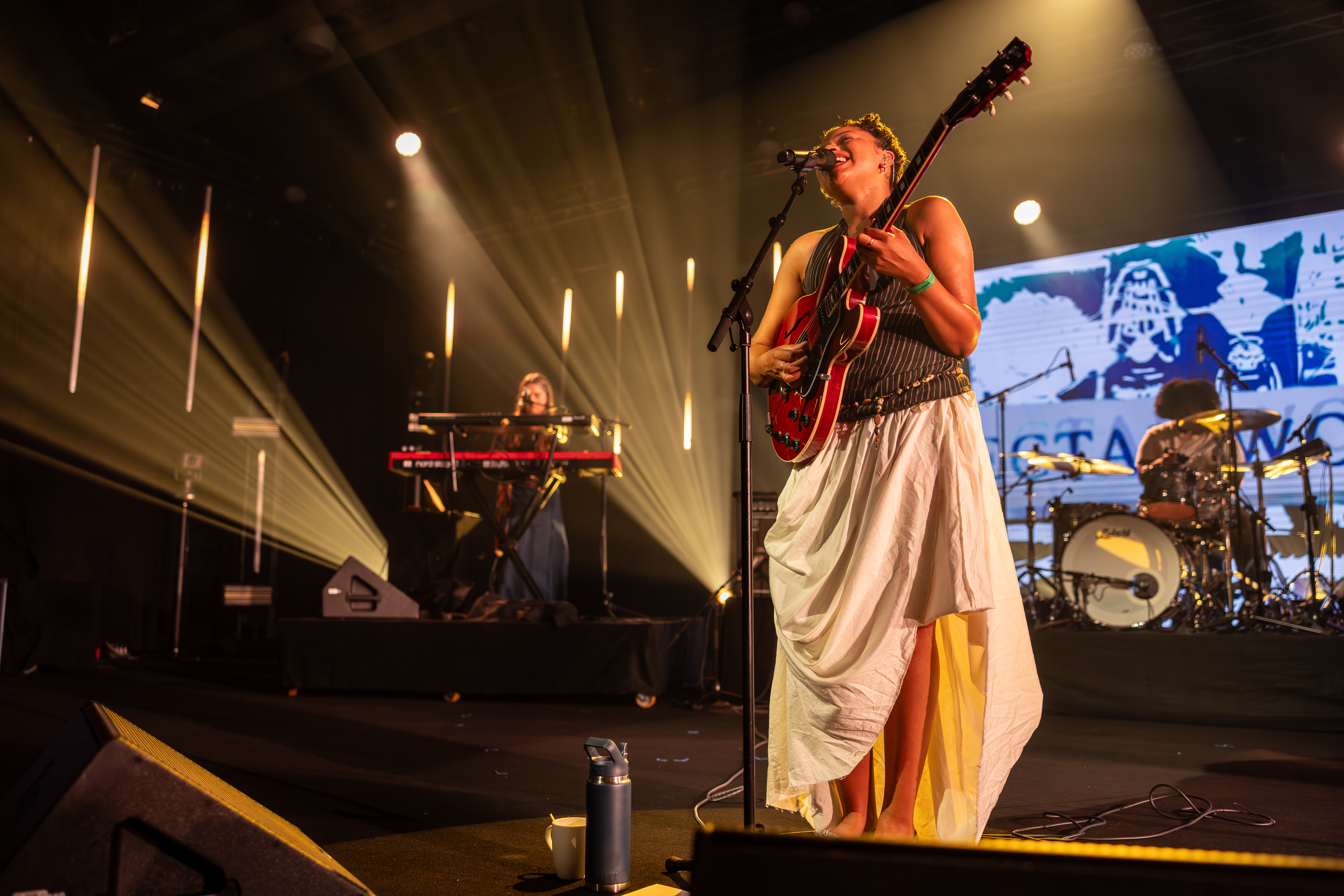
Nectar Woode at the Montreux Jazz Festival 2026

The festival was originally held at the original Montreux Casino, which burned down in December 1971 during Frank Zappa's performance (as referenced in "Smoke on the Water" by Deep Purple). The festival was held then in other auditoriums in Montreux, until it could return to the rebuilt new Casino in 1975. The festival continued to grow, and in 1993, it moved to the larger Montreux Convention Centre. From 1995 through 2008, it occupied both the convention centre and the casino. Beginning with the 41st MJF in 2007, nightly performances of headliners were again moved mainly to the Montreux Musique & Convention Centre (though the Casino still hosts the odd one-off shows), owing mainly to logistics: the Casino is approximately 1 kilometre (1,100 yd) from the Convention Centre, making it difficult for crew, artists and technical personnel (as well as fans) to travel easily through crowded streets from one venue to the other. (This is exacerbated by the presence of a large number of streetside vendors and artisans – as well as strolling crowds of tourists – on the lakefront walk that connects the venues.) As of 2007, the Convention Centre hosts two main stages, Auditorium Stravinski (capacity 3,500) and Miles Davis Hall (capacity 1,800), as well as the smaller Montreux Jazz Cafe, and several smaller open-air stages around the Centre. Additional themed shows (Bahia, Blues, etc.) are held on boats cruising the lake and train cars traveling the region, and various workshops and competitions are held at the nearby Montreux Palais and Le Petit Palais.

The Convention Centre closed for renovation in July 2023, and is expected to reopen in 2025. During its closure, major concerts at the Festival will be held on a specially built stage on the lake.

=== Venue history ===
Venue history
Date	Venue
16–18 June 1967	Montreux Casino
12–16 June 1968	Montreux Casino
18–22 June 1969	Montreux Casino
17–21 June 1970	Montreux Casino
12–20 June 1971	Montreux Casino
16–29 June 1972	Pavillon Montreux
29 June – 15 July 1973	Montreux Convention Centre
28 June – 7 July 1974	Montreux Convention Centre
3–20 July 1975	Montreux Casino
25 June – 6 July 1976	Montreux Casino
1–24 July 1977	Montreux Casino
7–23 July 1978	Montreux Casino
6–22 July 1979	Montreux Casino
4–20 July 1980	Montreux Casino
3–20 July 1981	Montreux Casino
9–25 July 1982	Montreux Casino
8–24 July 1983	Montreux Casino
6–22 July 1984	Montreux Casino
5–20 July 1985	Montreux Casino
3–19 July 1986	Montreux Casino
3–17 July 1987	Montreux Casino
1–17 July 1988	Montreux Casino
7–22 July 1989	Montreux Casino
6–21 July 1990	Montreux Casino
9–29 July 1991	Montreux Casino
10–22 July 1992	Montreux Casino
2–17 July 1993	Montreux Convention Centre (Auditorium Stravinski/The New Q's)
1–16 July 1994	Montreux Convention Centre (Auditorium Stravinski/Miles Davis Hall)
7–22 July 1995	Montreux Convention Centre (Auditorium Stravinski/Miles Davis Hall); Montreux Casino; Montreux Jazz Café
5–20 July 1996	Montreux Convention Centre (Auditorium Stravinski/Miles Davis Hall); Montreux Casino; Montreux Jazz Café
4–19 July 1997	Montreux Convention Centre (Auditorium Stravinski/Miles Davis Hall); Montreux Casino; Montreux Jazz Café
3–18 July 1998	Montreux Convention Centre (Auditorium Stravinski/Miles Davis Hall); Montreux Casino; Montreux Jazz Café
2–17 July 1999	Montreux Convention Centre (Auditorium Stravinski/Miles Davis Hall); Montreux Casino; Montreux Jazz Café
7–22 July 2000	Montreux Convention Centre (Auditorium Stravinski/Miles Davis Hall); Montreux Casino; Montreux Jazz Café
6–21 July 2001	Montreux Convention Centre (Auditorium Stravinski/Miles Davis Hall); Montreux Casino; Montreux Jazz Café; Scène Bleu
5–20 July 2002	Montreux Convention Centre (Auditorium Stravinski/Miles Davis Hall); Montreux Casino; Montreux Jazz Café; Montreux Jazz Young Planet; Montreux Jazz Club
4–19 July 2003	Montreux Convention Centre (Auditorium Stravinski/Miles Davis Hall); Casino Barrière de Montreux; Montreux Jazz Café; Montreux Jazz Young Planet; Montreux Jazz Club
2–17 July 2004	Montreux Convention Centre (Auditorium Stravinski/Miles Davis Hall); Casino Barrière de Montreux; Montreux Jazz Café; Montreux Jazz Young Planet; Montreux Jazz Club
1–16 July 2005	Montreux Convention Centre (Auditorium Stravinski/Miles Davis Hall); Casino Barrière de Montreux; Montreux Jazz Café; Montreux Jazz Young Planet; Montreux Jazz Club
30 June – 15 July 2006	Montreux Convention Centre (Auditorium Stravinski/Miles Davis Hall); Casino Barrière de Montreux; Montreux Jazz Café; Montreux Jazz Young Planet; Montreux Jazz Club
6–21 July 2007	Montreux Musique & Convention Centre (Auditorium Stravinski/Miles Davis Hall); Montreux Jazz Café; Montreux Jazz Young Planet; Montreux Jazz Club
4–19 July 2008	Montreux Musique & Convention Centre (Auditorium Stravinski/Miles Davis Hall); Montreux Jazz Café; Montreux Jazz Young Planet; Montreux Jazz Club; MDH Club; Studio 41; Music in the Park
3–18 July 2009	Montreux Musique & Convention Centre (Auditorium Stravinski/Miles Davis Hall); Montreux Jazz Café; Montreux Jazz Young Planet; Montreux Jazz Club; MDH Club; Studio 41; Music in the Park
2–17 July 2010	Montreux Musique & Convention Centre (Auditorium Stravinski/Miles Davis Hall); Montreux Jazz Café; Montreux Jazz Young Planet; Montreux Jazz Club; MDH Club; Studio 41; Music in the Park
1–16 July 2011	Montreux Musique & Convention Centre (Auditorium Stravinski/Miles Davis Hall); Montreux Jazz Café; Montreux Jazz Young Planet; Montreux Jazz Club; MDH Club; Studio 41; Music in the Park
29 June – 14 July 2012	Montreux Musique & Convention Centre (Auditorium Stravinski/Miles Davis Hall); Montreux Jazz Café; Montreux Jazz Young Planet; Montreux Jazz Club; MDH Club; Studio 41; Music in the Park
5–20 July 2013	Montreux Musique & Convention Centre (Auditorium Stravinski/Miles Davis Hall); Montreux Jazz Café; Montreux Jazz Young Planet; Montreux Jazz Club; MDH Club; Studio 41; Music in the Park; Montreux Jazz Lab
4–19 July 2014	Montreux Musique & Convention Centre (Auditorium Stravinski/Miles Davis Hall); Montreux Jazz Café; Montreux Jazz Young Planet; Montreux Jazz Club; MDH Club; Studio 41; Music in the Park; Montreux Jazz Lab
3–18 July 2015	Montreux Musique & Convention Centre (Auditorium Stravinski/Miles Davis Hall); Montreux Jazz Café; Montreux Jazz Young Planet; Montreux Jazz Club; MDH Club; Studio 41; Music in the Park; Montreux Jazz Lab
1–16 July 2016	Montreux Musique & Convention Centre (Auditorium Stravinski/Miles Davis Hall); Montreux Jazz Café; Montreux Jazz Young Planet; Montreux Jazz Club; MDH Club; Studio 41; Music in the Park; Montreux Jazz Lab
30 June – 15 July 2017	Montreux Musique & Convention Centre (Auditorium Stravinski/Miles Davis Hall); Montreux Jazz Café; Montreux Jazz Young Planet; Montreux Jazz Club; MDH Club; Studio 41; Music in the Park; Montreux Jazz Lab
29 June – 14 July 2018	Montreux Musique & Convention Centre (Auditorium Stravinski/Miles Davis Hall); Montreux Jazz Café; Montreux Jazz Young Planet; Montreux Jazz Club; MDH Club; Studio 41; Music in the Park; Montreux Jazz Lab
28 June – 13 July 2019	Montreux Musique & Convention Centre (Auditorium Stravinski/Miles Davis Hall); Montreux Jazz Café; Montreux Jazz Young Planet; Montreux Jazz Club; MDH Club; Studio 41; Music in the Park; Montreux Jazz Lab
2–17 July 2021	Montreux Musique & Convention Centre (Auditorium Stravinski/Miles Davis Hall); Montreux Jazz Café; Montreux Jazz Young Planet; Montreux Jazz Club; MDH Club; Studio 41; Music in the Park; Montreux Jazz Lab
1–16 July 2022	Montreux Musique & Convention Centre (Auditorium Stravinski/Miles Davis Hall); Montreux Jazz Café; Montreux Jazz Young Planet; Montreux Jazz Club; MDH Club; Studio 41; Music in the Park; Montreux Jazz Lab
30 June – 15 July 2023	Montreux Musique & Convention Centre (Auditorium Stravinski/Miles Davis Hall); Montreux Jazz Café; Montreux Jazz Young Planet; Montreux Jazz Club; MDH Club; Studio 41; Music in the Park; Montreux Jazz Lab
5–20 July 2024	Scène du Lac; Scène du Casino; Lake House; El Mundo; Ipanema; Li Lo; Funky Claude's Bar; Lisztomania; Super Bock Stage; Terrasse Ibis Music; Terrasse Nestlé; Poolparty; Audemars Piguet Parallel Experience
4–19 July 2025	Scène du Lac; Scène du Casino; Lake House; El Mundo; Ipanema; Li Lo; Funky Claude's Bar; Lisztomania; Super Bock Stage; Terrasse Ibis Music; Terrasse Nestlé; Poolparty; Audemars Piguet Parallel Experience
3–18 July 2026	Montreux Musique & Convention Centre (Auditorium Stravinski/Montreux Jazz Lab); Montreux Jazz Loft; Lake House; Funky Claude's Bar; El Mundo; Li Lo; Nestlé Sunset Stage; Spotlight Stage supported by Julius Bär; Super Bock Stage; Audemars Piguet Parallel Experience; Poolparty

== Expansion ==
The festival changed in the 1980s: it grew dramatically and included an even wider variety of music styles. Jazz remained important, as did Brazilian music, but more rock and pop artists were also invited.

Miles Davis came to Montreux several times, British hard rock band Deep Purple were invited as headliners eight times, and Status Quo have headlined the festival twice. Other notable artists at Montreux were Sandra, Max Roach, James Brown, George Clinton and Parliament-Funkadelic, Wynton Marsalis, Art Blakey, John McLaughlin, Stevie Ray Vaughan, Wayne Shorter, Al Di Meola, Elvis Costello, Jimmy Cliff, Steel Pulse, Mike Oldfield, Brian May, Marvin Gaye, Rory Gallagher, Leonard Cohen, Nina Hagen, Eric Clapton, Queen, Phil Collins, Philip Bailey, Joe Cocker, Los Lobos, The Manhattan Transfer, Tracy Chapman, and Van Morrison again.

The expansion that began in the 1980s has continued since then – Montreux transformed from a jazz festival into a world music festival. Quincy Jones co-produced the festival from 1991 to 1993. By 1993, the festival had outgrown the Casino and moved to the larger Convention Centre. The number of visitors rose from 75,000 in 1980 to 120,000 in 1994, and an "Off-festival" developed on the lakeshore promenades and in the cafés of Montreux.

Many "regulars" returned, but many new artists also appeared on stage: Sting, Bob Dylan, Fats Domino, Deep Purple, Al Jarreau, Chaka Khan, Johnny Cash, Cheap Trick, Cheb Mami, Youssou N'Dour, Marianne Faithfull, Ice-T, Jazzmatazz, ZZ Top, Simply Red, Marisa Monte, George Benson, Jazzkantine, Alanis Morissette, David Bowie, Paul Simon. In 1999, the festival saw more than 220,000 visitors.

The festival has also played host to some well-known and talented student groups, including big bands and vocal ensembles. Young, talented musicians are encouraged to take part in several competitions.

== Sustainability ==
The Montreux Jazz Festival has progressively introduced environmental initiatives aimed at reducing the ecological impact of the event. These measures include waste reduction programs, recycling systems across the festival venues, and efforts to limit single-use plastics through the promotion of reusable containers.

The festival also encourages the use of public transport by visitors, leveraging the city's railway connections and coordinating with local transportation services to reduce car usage during the event period. Additionally, strategies like energy efficiency and collaborations with local authorities have been incorporated into the event planning to manage the environmental footprint of large scale attendance.

== Competitions ==
Three international competitions are organised by the Montreux Jazz Artists Foundation every year: Solo Piano, Guitar, and Voice. Each competition has its own jury composed of professionals and chaired by a world-renowned musician (in 2008: Fazıl Say for the Piano Solo, Lee Ritenour for the Guitar, Patti Austin for the Voice competition). In addition, until 2016, a local competition, the Tremplin Lémanique, was aimed at jazz bands that are based in one of the regions of the Léman lake: the French departments of Ain and Haute Savoie and the Swiss cantons of Geneva, Vaud and Valais.

== Performances ==
Over 1300 artists have performed at the Festival from 1967 to 2016, with the most appearances by Herbie Hancock (27 times) and B.B. King (21 times).

== Discography ==
Albums recorded at the festival

- Alanis Morissette: Live at Montreux 2012 (Eagle Rock Entertainment, 2013) [CD/DVD/Blu-ray] – recorded in 2012
- Alice Cooper: Live at Montreux (Eagle Vision, 2006) [CD/DVD] – recorded in 2005
- Anna von Hausswolff: Live at Montreux Jazz Festival (Southern Lord, 2022) – recorded in 2018
- Arista All Stars: Blue Montreux (Arista, 1979) – recorded in 1978
- Atlantic Family: The Atlantic Family Live at Montreux (Atlantic, 1978) – recorded in 1977
- Baby Consuelo: Baby Consuelo ao Vivo – 14th Montreux Jazz Festival (Elektra, 1980)
- Benny Carter: Benny Carter 4: Montreux '77 (Pablo Live, 1977)
- Bill Evans: Bill Evans at the Montreux Jazz Festival (Verve, 1968)
- Bill Evans: Montreux II (CTI, 1970)
- Bill Evans: Montreux III (Fantasy, 1975)
- Bob James: Live at Montreux (Koch, 2005) [DVD]
- Bobbi Humphrey: Bobbi Humphrey Live: Cookin' with Blue Note at Montreux (Blue Note, 1974) – recorded in 1973
- Bobby Hutcherson: Bobby Hutcherson Live at Montreux (Blue Note, 1974) – recorded in 1973
- Burning Spear: Live at Montreaux Jazz Festival 2001 (Reggae, 2002) – recorded in 2001
- Canned Heat: Live at Montreux 1973 (Eagle, 2012) – recorded in 1973
- Carlos Santana and Wayne Shorter: Live at the Montreux Jazz Festival 1988 (Image Entertainment, 2005) [2CD+DVD]
- Carmen McRae: Everything Happens To Me (Jazz Hour, 1994) – reissued as Live at Montreux 1982 (Solid, 2018)
- Cecil Taylor: Silent Tongues (Freedom, 1975) – recorded in 1974
- Charles Earland: Kharma (Prestige, 1974)
- Charles Lloyd Quartet: Montreux 82 (Elektra/Musician, 1983) – recorded in 1982
- Chick Corea: Live in Montreux (GRP, 1994) – recorded in 1981
- Count Basie: Fun Time (Pablo, 1975)
- Count Basie: Count Basie Jam Session at the Montreux Jazz Festival 1975 (Pablo, 1975)
- Count Basie: Montreux '77 (Pablo, 1977)
- Deep Purple: Live at Montreux 1996 (Eagle, 2006)
- Deep Purple: Live at Montreux 2006 (Eagle, 2007) – recorded in 2006
- Deep Purple: Live at Montreux 2011 (Eagle, 2011)
- Dennis Brown: Live at Montreux (Atlantic, 1979)
- Dexter Gordon and Junior Mance: Dexter Gordon with Junior Mance at Montreux (Prestige, 1970)
- Dexter Gordon: Blues à la Suisse (Prestige, 1973)
- Don Ellis: Don Ellis Live at Montreux (Atlantic, 1978) – recorded in 1977
- Donald Byrd: Live: Cookin' with Blue Note at Montreux (Blue Note, 2022) – recorded in 1973
- Don Pullen & the African-Brazilian Connection: Live...Again: Live at Montreux (Blue Note, 1993)
- Earl Hines: West Side Story (Black Lion, 1974)
- Ella Fitzgerald: Montreux '77 (Pablo, 1977)
- Ella Fitzgerald: Digital III at Montreux (Pablo, 1979)
- Elis Regina with Hermeto Pascoal: Montreux Jazz Festival 1979 (WEA, 1982)
- Etta James: Live at Montreux 1975-1993 (Ear Music, 2020)
- Gary Moore & The Midnight Blues Band: Gary Moore & The Midnight Blues Band – Live at Montreux 1990 (Eagle Rock Entertainment, 2004) [DVD]
- Gary Moore: Gary Moore – The Definitive Montreux Collection (Eagle Rock Entertainment, 2007)
- Gene Ammons: Gene Ammons and Friends at Montreux (Prestige, 1973)
- Gil Evans: Montreux Jazz Festival '74 (Philips [Japan], 1975)
- Hermeto Pascoal: Ao Vivo Montreux Jazz (Atlantic, 1979) [2LP]
- Rory Gallagher: Live in Montreux (Eagle, 2006)
- Dizzy Gillespie: The Dizzy Gillespie Big 7 (Pablo, 1975)
- Dizzy Gillespie: Dizzy Gillespie Jam (Pablo, 1977)
- Dizzy Gillespie: Musician, Composer, Raconteur (Pablo, 1981)
- Hampton Hawes: Playin' in the Yard (Prestige, 1973)
- James Booker: Live at Montreux (Montreux Sounds, 1997)
- Jamiroquai: Jamiroquai – Live at Montreux 2003 (Eagle Vision, 2007) [DVD/Blu-ray]
- Jethro Tull: Live at Montreux 2003 (2003) [2CD, DVD]
- João Gilberto: Live in Montreux (Elektra/Musician, 1987) – recorded in 1985
- Joe Pass: Montreux '77 – Live (Pablo, 1977)
- Junko Onishi: Junko Onishi Trio at the Montreux Jazz Festival (Toshiba EMI, 1997) [LD/VHS]
- John Lee Hooker & The Coast To Coast Blues Band: Live At Montreux 1983 & 1990 (Eagle Pop Entertainment, 2020)
- King Sunny Adé: Live at Montreux (1982)
- Korn: Live at Montreux 2004 (2004)
- Les McCann: Live at Montreux (Atlantic, 1973) – recorded in 1972
- Les McCann and Eddie Harris: Swiss Movement (Atlantic, 1969)
- Little Milton: What It Is: Live at Montreux (Atlantic, 1973)
- Louisiana Red: Live in Montreux (Earwig, 2000) – recorded in 1975
- Luther Allison: Live in Montreux 1976–1994 (Ruf, 1996) – compilation
- Marlena Shaw: Marlena Shaw Live at Montreux (Blue Note, 1974) – recorded in 1973
- McCoy Tyner: Enlightenment (Milestone, 1973)
- Michel Petrucciani: Power of Three (Blue Note, 1986)[LP/CD]
- Mike Oldfield: Live at Montreux 1981 (Eagle Vision, 2006) [DVD]
- Mike Mainieri & Warren Bernhardt: Free Smiles: Live At Montreux 1978 (Arista Novus, 1978)
- Miles Davis & Quincy Jones: Miles & Quincy Live at Montreux (Warner Bros., 1991)
- Modern Jazz Quartet: Together Again: Live at the Montreux Jazz Festival '82 (Pablo, 1982)
- Monty Alexander Trio: Monty Alexander Live! at the Montreux Jazz Festival (MPS, 1977) – recorded in 1976
- Mötorhead: LIVE AT THE MONTREUX JAZZ FESTIVAL 2007 - [LP/CD]
- Ney Matogrosso & Caetano Veloso & Joao Bosco: "BRAZIL NIGHT - AO VIVO EM MONTREUX - CAETANO VELOSO, JOÃO BOSCO E NEY MATOGROSSO 1983“
- Naoya Matsuoka & Wesing; LIVE at MONTREUX FESTIVAL (Warner Bros., 1980)
- Nina Simone: "Live At Montreux 1976" (Eagle Recordings, 2001) [DVD]
- Nile Rodgers & Chic: Live at Montreux 2004 (Eagle Vision, 2005) [DVD]
- Ofra Haza: At Montreux Jazz Festival (Locust Music, 1998) [CD/DVD]
- Oliver Nelson: Swiss Suite (Flying Dutchman, 1970)
- Oscar Peterson: Oscar Peterson Jam – Montreux '77 (Pablo, 1977)
- Otis Rush: Live at Montreux 1986 (1986) – joint performance with Eric Clapton and Luther Allison
- Peter Tosh: Remedies For Babylon (Discurios, 1992) – recorded in 1979
- Pino Daniele: Sció live (EMI Italiana, 1984) [2LP] – 1 track recorded in 1983
- Rachelle Ferrell: Live in Montreux 91-97 (Blue Note, 2002) – compilation
- Randy Weston: Carnival (Freedom, 1974)
- Ray Bryant: Alone at Montreux (Atlantic, 1972)
- Ray Charles: Live at Montreux 1997 (Eagle, 2008) [Blu-ray]
- Raye: Live at Montreux Jazz Festival (2024) (Human Re Source, 2024)
- Run–D.M.C.: Live at Montreux 2001 (Eagle, 2007) – recorded in 2001
- Sadao Watanabe: At Montreux Jazz Festival (CBS/Sony, 1971) – recorded in 1970
- Sam Rivers: Streams (Impulse, 1973)
- Simply Red: Live at Montreux Jazz Festival – part of Stars Collectors Edition (1992)
- The Smile: The Smile (Live at Montreux Jazz Festival, July 2022) (XL Recordings, 2022)
- Steve Earle: Live at Montreux 2005 (Eagle, 2006)
- Stevie Ray Vaughan: Live at Montreux 1982 & 1985 (Epic, 2001)
- Stuff: Live at Montreux 1976 (Eagle, 2008) – recorded in 1976
- Sun Ra: Live at Montreux (Saturn Research, 1977)[2LP] – recorded in 1976
- Talk Talk: Live at Montreux 1986 (Eagle Vision, 2008) – recorded in 1986
- The Dubliners: Live at Montreux (Intercord, 1977) – recorded in 1976
- Titãs: Go Back (WEA, 1988)
- Tommy Flanagan: Montreux '77 (Pablo, 1977)
- Tori Amos: Live at Montreux 1991/1992 (Eagle, 2008) – recorded in 1991, 92
- Toto: Live at Montreux 1991 (Eagle, 2016)
- Van Morrison: Live at Montreux 1980/1974 (Eagle, 2006) – recorded in 1974, 80
- Yes: Live at Montreux 2003 (Eagle, 2007)
- Yōsuke Yamashita: Montreux Afterglow (Frasco, 1976)
- ZZ Top: Live at Montreux 2013 (Eagle Vision, 2014) – recorded in 2013
- Various Artists: Montreux Summit Volumes 1 & 2 (Columbia, 1977) [2LP] – consisting of an all-star concert with various Columbia label artists including Bob James, Stan Getz, Dexter Gordon, Billy Cobham, George Duke, Benny Golson, Eric Gale, Hubert Laws, Maynard Ferguson and many others
- Various Artists: Casino Lights (1981) – Featuring duets with Al Jarreau and Randy Crawford, Randy Crawford solo, Yellowjackets, and other artists
- Various Artists: Casino Lights (Warner Bros., 2000) [2CD] – recorded in 1999. consisting of an all-star concert with various Warner Bros. label artists
