= Montreux Music & Convention Centre =

Coordinates: 46°26′N 6°55′E

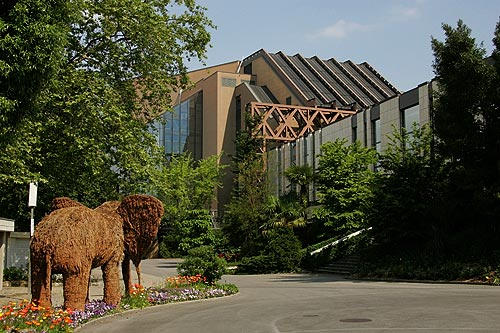
Montreux Music & Convention Centre

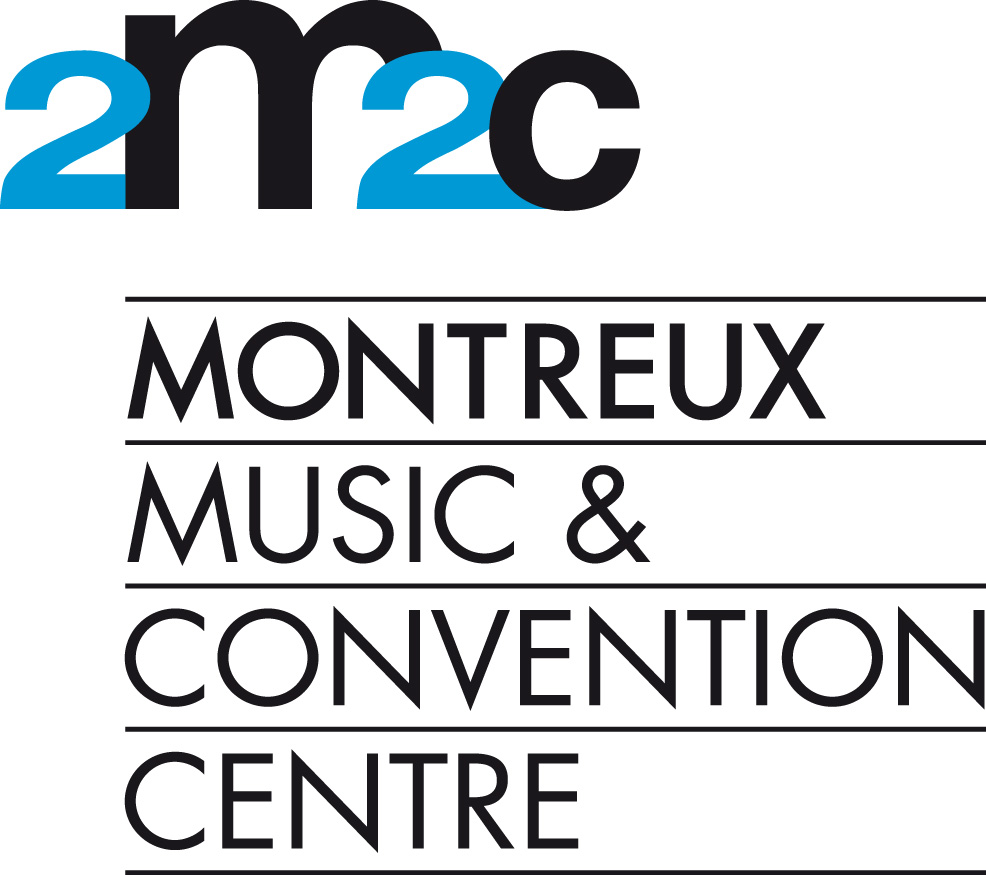

The Montreux Music & Convention Centre (formerly and still commonly known as the Montreux Convention Centre) is a multi-purpose complex located in Montreux, Switzerland. It hosts the annual Montreux Jazz Festival. The convention center's main venues are the 4,000-capacity Auditorium Stravinski and the 2,000-capacity Miles Davis Hall. The facility opened in 1973 and received its current name in 2006.

The complex closed for renovation work in July 2023, and reopened in July 2026.
