= Mizell Brothers =

American record producing team; sibling duo

The Mizell Brothers were an American record producing team in the 1970s, consisting of Larry Mizell (born February 17, 1944) and Alphonso "Fonce" Mizell (January 15, 1943 – July 5, 2011). They worked together on a string of jazz fusion, crossover jazz, soul, R&B, and disco records.

== Career ==
Larry earned a degree in engineering and Fonce Mizell earned a degree in music from Howard University. While there they formed and performed in a jazz vocal quartet, the Vanlords. In the early 1970s, Larry and Fonce Mizell moved to California to start their own company, Sky High Productions. They went on to produce albums for Blue Note Records that set the tone for jazz fusion and the era. They produced Johnny Hammond Smith, Roger Glenn, The Blackbyrds, and Donald Byrd. The Mizell Brothers often used the same musicians on their albums, including Harvey Mason on drums, Mayuto Correa on percussion, Melvin "Wah Wah Watson" Ragin and David T. Walker on guitar, Chuck Rainey on bass and Jerry Peters on piano. Freddie Perren and Chuck Davis were sometimes involved as co-writers or co-producers.

Later hits of Sky High Productions include A Taste of Honey's platinum-selling roller-rink anthem of 1978 "Boogie Oogie Oogie", L.T.D.'s "Love Ballad", a number 1 R&B hit (#20 pop) in 1976, and Mary Wells' funky disco 12-inch "Gigolo" in 1982. Younger brother Rodney Mizell co-wrote some of their songs, although most material initially was written by Larry Mizell, later joined by Fonce. They also included a number of Motown hits on Donald Byrd's albums including Just My Imagination and Dancing in the Street. In the 1980s, the Mizell brothers retired from the record industry, but returned in the 2000s. Larry Mizell wrote and performed vocals on the song "Play with the Changes" on the 4hero album of the same name in 2007.

== Larry ==
As an electrical engineer, Larry Mizell performed testing and reliability work on the Lunar Module for the NASA Apollo program. He was one of the first to do research on liquid crystals, which today are used in displays (LCD).

== Alphonso ==
Alphonso Mizell was a member of The Corporation, the Motown hit-making production team that wrote and produced all of The Jackson 5's early hits from 1969 through 1971, including "I Want You Back," "ABC," "The Love You Save," "Mama's Pearl," and "Maybe Tomorrow." The Corporation also consisted of Motown founder Berry Gordy plus writer-producers Deke Richards, who brought Fonce to the company, and Freddie Perren, a classmate of the Mizells at Howard who also later worked for Sky High Productions.

When Motown moved to Los Angeles, the Mizells joined up with trumpet player Donald Byrd under whom they had studied while at Howard University. Their first album, Black Byrd on the Blue Note label, was the first of a string of albums together that would define jazz-funk and lay the foundation for acid jazz and neo soul. Alphonso died of heart failure on July 5, 2011 at age 68.

== Personal life ==
According to Larry Mizell's son, Larry Mizell Jr., the Mizell Brothers are cousins to Run-DMC member Jam Master Jay as well as Ronnie Spector, Estelle Bennett and Nedra Talley of the 1960s girl group The Ronettes and related to songwriter Andy Razaf.

== Discography ==
Year	Artist	Album	Label	Tracks Produced
1972	Donald Byrd	Black Byrd	Blue Note Records	Entire Album
1973	Donald Byrd	Street Lady	Blue Note	Entire Album
1973	Bobbi Humphrey	Blacks and Blues	Blue Note	Entire Album
1973	The Miracles	Renaissance	Motown Records	Wigs And Lashes & Don't Let It End ('Til You Let It Begin) (Co-Produced with Freddie Perren)
1973	The Jackson 5	Skywriter	Motown	Hallelujah Day & Ooh, I'd Love To Be With You (Co-Produced with Freddie Perren)
1973	Michael Jackson	Music & Me	Motown	With A Child's Heart & Up Again (Co-Produced with Freddie Perren)
1973	Jermaine Jackson	Come Into My Life	Motown	You're In Good Hands (Co-Produced with Freddie Perren)
1973	Elaine Brown	Elaine Brown	Black Forum	Entire Album (Fonce Mizell only, Co-Produced with Freddie Perren)
1974	Donald Byrd	Stepping into Tomorrow	Blue Note	Entire Album
1974	Bobbi Humphrey	Satin Doll	Blue Note	Entire Album
1974	The Blackbyrds	The Blackbyrds	Fantasy Records	Entire Album
1974	Johnny Hammond	Gambler's Life	Salvation Records	Entire Album
1974	Edwin Starr	Hell Up in Harlem	Motown	Entire Album (Co-Produced with Freddie Perren)
1974	Brenda Lee Eager	"When I'm With You"	Mercury Records	When I'm With You (7" Single)
1974	Margie Evans	"Waterfalls"	Buddah Records	Waterfalls (7" Single)
1975	Donald Byrd	Places and Spaces	Blue Note	Entire Album
1975	Bobbi Humphrey	Fancy Dancer	Blue Note	Entire Album
1975	Johnny Hammond	Gears	Milestone Records	Entire Album
1975	Gary Bartz	The Shadow Do	Prestige Records	Entire Album
1975	Michael Jackson	Forever, Michael	Motown	I'll Come Home To You (Co-Produced with Freddie Perren)
1976	Donald Byrd	Caricatures	Blue Note	Entire Album
1976	L.T.D.	Love To The World	A&M Records	Entire Album
1976	Roger Glenn	Reachin'	Fantasy	Entire Album
1977	Gary Bartz	Music Is My Sanctuary	Capitol Records	Entire Album
1977	The Rance Allen Group	Say My Friend	Capitol	Entire Album
1978	A Taste of Honey	A Taste Of Honey	Capitol	Entire Album
1979	A Taste of Honey	Another Taste	Capitol	Entire Album
1981	Mary Wells	In And Out Of Love	Epic Records	Gigolo
