= Ronnie Foster =

American organist and record producer

- Born: May 12, 1950 (age 75); Buffalo, New York, U.S.
- Genres: Jazz; jazz fusion; smooth jazz
- Occupations: Musician; composer; arranger; producer
- Instruments: Organ; electric piano; acoustic piano; synthesizer
- Years active: 1970–present
- Labels: Blue Note; Columbia

Ronnie Foster (born May 12, 1950) is an American funk and soul jazz organist, and record producer. His albums recorded for Blue Note Records in the 1970s have gained a cult following after the emergence of acid jazz.

== Early life ==
Foster was born in Buffalo, New York, on May 12, 1950, to Roslyn M. Foster. He attended Public School 8, Woodlawn Jr. High for a year, McKinley Vocational High School for two years, and then spent his final year at Lafayette High School. He was attracted to music at the age of four, took it more seriously from his early teens, and had his first professional gig, aged fifteen, playing in a strip club. The only formal musical instruction he received was a month of accordion lessons.

== Later life and career ==
Foster initially performed with other local musicians. He moved to New York City with his own band, and acquired a publishing company. Foster has performed as a sideman with a wide range of musicians. He frequently worked with guitarist George Benson, including playing on the guitarist's album Breezin'. Foster has also played organ with Grant Green, Grover Washington, Jr., Stanley Turrentine, Roberta Flack, Earl Klugh, Harvey Mason, Jimmy Smith, and Stevie Wonder. He is also a record producer. Ronnie Foster's song "Mystic Brew" was sampled in Electric Relaxation by A Tribe Called Quest as well as later in J. Cole's song Forbidden Fruit. Later in 2016, J. Cole confirmed that the song "Mystic Brew" was reversed, pitched, and slowed down in the song Neighbors as well as the instrumental of Forbidden Fruit.

== Discography ==
=== As leader ===
Recording date	Title	Label	Year released	Notes
1972-01	Two Headed Freap	Blue Note	1972	
1972-12	Sweet Revival	Blue Note	1973	
1973-07	Live at Montreux	Blue Note	1974	Live
1974-04, 1974-05	On the Avenue	Blue Note	1974	
1975-03	Cheshire Cat	Blue Note	1975	
1978?	Love Satellite	Columbia	1978	
1979?	Delight	Columbia	1979	
1985	The Racer	Pro Jazz	1986	
2022?	Reboot	Blue Note	2022	

=== As sideman ===
With George Benson

- Good King Bad (CTI, 1976) – rec. 1975
- In Concert-Carnegie Hall (CTI, 1976) – live rec. 1975
- Breezin' (Warner Bros., 1976)
- In Flight (Warner Bros., 1977)
- Weekend in L.A. (Warner Bros., 1978) – live rec. 1977
- Livin' Inside Your Love (Warner Bros., 1979)
- Pacific Fire (CTI, 1983) - rec. 1975

With Chayanne

- Chayanne (CBS, 1987)
- Chayanne (CBS, 1988)
- Volver a Nacer (Sony Latin, 1996)
- Simplemente (Sony Latin, 2000)

With Jorge Dalto

- Chevere (United Artists, 1976)
- Listen Up! (Gaia Records, 1988)

With Djavan

- Luz (CBS, 1982)
- Bird of Paradise (Columbia, 1988)

With Roberta Flack

- Blue Lights in the Basement (Atlantic, 1977)
- Roberta Flack (Atlantic, 1978)
- Roberta Flack Featuring Donny Hathaway (Atlantic, 1980)

With Grant Green

- Alive! (Blue Note, 1970) – live
- Live at Club Mozambique (Blue Note, 2006) – rec. 1971

With Jermaine Jackson

- Let Me Tickle Your Fancy (Motown, 1982)
- Jermaine Jackson (Arista-BMG, 1984)

With Earl Klugh

- Crazy for You (EMI, 1981)
- Low Ride (Capitol, 1982)
- Wishful Thinking (EMI, 1984)
- Whispers and Promises (Warner Bros., 1989)
- Midnight in San Juan (Warner Bros., 1991)
- Sudden Burst of Energy (Warner Bros., 1996)

With Jimmy Smith

- Unfinished Business (Mercury, 1978)
- The Cat Strikes Again (Wersi Records, 1980)

With others

- Chet Atkins, Street Dreams (Columbia, 1986)
- João Bosco – Ai, Ai, Ai De Mim (CBS, 1986)
- Charles Jackson – Gonna Getcha' Love (Capitol, 1979)
- The Jacksons, Triumph (Epic, 1980)
- Leon "Ndugu" Chancler – Old Friends New Friends (MCA, 1989)
- Jimmy Ponder – Illusions (ABC Impulse!, 1976)
- Robbie Robertson, Storyville (Geffen, 1991)
- David Sanborn - A Change of Heart (Warner Bros, 1987)
- Lalo Schifrin – No One Home (Tabu, 1979)
- The Temptations – Truly for You (Gordy, 1984)
- Stanley Turrentine, Wonderland (Blue Note, 1987) – rec. 1986
- Grover Washington Jr., Time Out of Mind (Columbia, 1989)
- Barry White – Dedicated (Unlimited Gold, 1983)
- Lenny Williams – Taking Chances (MCA, 1981)
- Stevie Wonder, Songs in the Key of Life (Tamla, 1976)
