= In and Out of Love (Mary Wells album) =

Studio album by Mary Wells
- Released: October 1981
- Recorded: 1980–1981
- Genre: R&B, funk
- Length: 39:33
- Label: Epic
- Producer: Fonce Mizell; Greg Perry

Mary Wells chronology
Servin' Up Some Soul (1968)	In and Out of Love (1981)	Easy Touch (1982)

Singles from In and Out of Love
- 1. "Gigolo" Released: 1981

Professional ratings
Review scores
Source	Rating
AllMusic	2/5 stars
The Encyclopedia of Popular Music	2/5 stars

In and Out of Love is the tenth studio effort and first album in thirteen years for R&B/soul singer Mary Wells, released on the Epic label.

== Overview ==
=== Coming out of retirement ===
By 1980, Mary Wells had only recorded on occasion since her last album, 1968's Servin' Up Some Soul, which Wells recorded for Jubilee Records. After a second planned Jubilee release was shelved, Wells left the label in 1970 for Reprise Records but after becoming a mother she had all but abandoned live performing. In 1971 and 1974, Wells would record a couple of singles that were released to little success.

After 1974, Wells virtually retired from music. Having once spent a half-decade on top as one of the first stars to emerge from Motown Records, the former Motown diva was looking for a change after her marriage to Cecil Womack dissolved in 1977 and a stormy relationship with Cecil's brother Curtis became off and on. She went back on the road in 1977 and was spotted by CBS Records' urban-based president Larkin Arnold and was offered a deal with Epic in 1980, which Wells accepted.

=== Release and reaction ===
Released in the late fall of 1981, In and Out of Love, produced by California-based R&B producer Greg Perry and the Mizell brothers (Fonce and Larry), the album was a departure for Wells as she incorporated funk elements into her sound with only "These Arms" being the obvious reference to her sixties past. The single, "Gigolo", was issued and created a buzz around the dance clubs in the U.S. The song's response was immediate, landing to number sixty-nine on the R&B chart, number two on the disco chart and number-thirteen on the club play chart. The album, however, failed to chart. Despite its relative mainstream failure, the album convinced Wells to continue her recording and performing career. She would release three more albums and several more singles on small labels until her death in 1992.

== Track listing ==
All songs written and produced by Greg Perry unless otherwise noted

1. "These Arms" (4:52)
2. "Share My Love" (5:57)
3. "You Make Me Feel So Good Inside" (4:07)
4. "Spend the Nights with Me" (4:15)
5. "Let's Mix It Up" (4:05)
6. "I'm Changing My Ways" (Mary Wells, Cecil Womack) (3:47)
7. "I'm Not the One" (4:10)
8. "Indian Giver" (4:30)
9. "Gigolo" (Larry Mizell, Fonce Mizell) (5:10)
