= Blacks and Blues =

Studio album by Bobbi Humphrey
- Released: 1973
- Recorded: June 6–8, 1973
- Studio: The Sound Factory, Hollywood, California
- Genre: Jazz-funk
- Length: 39:34
- Label: Blue Note
- Producer: Larry Mizell

Bobbi Humphrey chronology
Dig This! (1972)	Blacks and Blues (1973)	Live at Montreux (1973)

Blacks and Blues is the third studio album by American jazz flutist Bobbi Humphrey. The album was recorded in 1973 and released on the Blue Note label.

== Reception ==
The AllMusic review by Steve Huey awarded the album 4½ stars stating "Bobbi Humphrey scored her biggest hit with her third album Blacks and Blues, an utterly delightful jazz-funk classic that helped make her a sensation at Montreux... Overall, the album's cumulative effect is like a soft summer breeze, perfect for beaches, barbecues, and cruising with the top down".

Professional ratings
Review scores
Source	Rating
AllMusic	4.5/5 stars

== Track listing ==
All compositions by Larry Mizell

1. "Chicago, Damn" – 6:31
2. "Harlem River Drive" – 7:50
3. "Just a Love Child" – 6:34
4. "Blacks and Blues" – 4:37
5. "Jasper Country Man" – 5:14
6. "Baby's Gone" – 8:48
  - Recorded at The Sound Factory, Los Angeles, California on June 6, 7 & 8, 1973

== Personnel ==
- Bobbi Humphrey – flute, vocals
- Larry Mizell – arranger, conductor, vocals
- Jerry Peters – piano, electric piano
- Fonce Mizell – clavinet, trumpet, vocals
- Freddie Perren – synthesizer, vocals
- David T. Walker – guitar
- Chuck Rainey – electric bass
- Harvey Mason – drums
- Stephanie Spruill – percussion
- Chuck Davis – vocals
