= Paul Winter (violinist) =

American violinist (1914–1992)

Paul Winter (March 9, 1914 – August 22, 1992) was an American virtuoso violinist.

== Career ==
Born in New York City, Winter became a member of the NBC Symphony Orchestra under Arturo Toscanini at its inception in 1937 and was its youngest member. He was concertmaster of the NBC staff orchestra from 1954 to 1958. Beginning 1958, Winter devoted his career to recording sessions and television.

He died in Forest Hills, Queens in 1992.

== Education ==
Winter was a graduate of the Juilliard School of Music. He studied violin with Paul Kochanski, Edouard Dethier, and Demetrius Constantine Dounis.

== Selected ensembles ==
- American String Quartet, founding member in 1939 as violinist, with Max Hollander (1910–1986) (violin), Carlton Cooley (viola), and Carl Stern (1902–1971) (cello)
