= Bianco (harpist) =

Eugene Bianco (March 29, 1927 – May 7, 2007), known professionally as Bianco, was a harpist who recorded for RCA Victor Records.

== Discography ==
With Ruth Brown

- Ruth Brown '65 (Mainstream, 1965)
- Softly (Mainstream, 1972)

With Henry Gross

- Henry Gross (A&M, 1972)

With Eddie Kendricks

- Vintage '78 (Arista, 1978)

With Chaka Khan

- Chaka (Warner Bros., 1978)

With Melanie

- As I See It Now (Neighborhood Records, 1975)

With Stevie Nicks

- The Wild Heart (Modern, 1983)

With Lou Rawls

- Now Is the Time (Epic, 1982)

With Marlena Shaw

- From the Depths of My Soul (Blue Note, 1973)
- Acting Up (Columbia, 1978)

With Emily Yancy

- Yancy (Mainstream, 1965)
