= George Butler (record producer) =

American jazz record producer (1931–2008)

George Butler (September 2, 1931 – April 9, 2008) was a prominent American jazz record producer, executive and A&R man. He worked for a number of well-known jazz record labels from the 1960s to the 1990s including Blue Note Records, Columbia Records and United Artists Records. He signed and launched the careers of a number of now famous artists including Wynton Marsalis, Harry Connick Jr. and Nnenna Freelon.

== Biography ==
Butler was born in Charlotte, North Carolina, and studied at Howard University before earning a master's degree in music education from Teachers College, Columbia University. In the early 1960s, he began working as an A&R executive for United Artists Records, where a few years later he was instrumental in establishing its Solid State Records jazz subsidiary.

He took over the running of subsidiary label, Blue Note, in 1972, helping to increase interest in the jazz format with numerous jazz-soul crossover projects aimed at a more mainstream audience, including albums by Donald Byrd, Earl Klugh, Ronnie Laws, and Bobbi Humphrey, as well as working with prominent jazz musicians from the 1960s, including Horace Silver and Bobby Hutcherson.

In the late 1970s, he became vice president for jazz and progressive artists and repertory at Columbia Records, staying into the mid-1990s. He helped to persuade Miles Davis to return to recording in 1980 and signed or was executive producer for fusion and soul-jazz acts, such as Bob James, Billy Cobham, and Grover Washington Jr.

Butler died of complications from Alzheimer's disease in Castro Valley, California, at the age of 76.
