= Where Are We Going =

Single by Remy Shand
- Released: 17 May 2013
- Genre: R&B, Neo Soul
- Length: 3:14
- Label: Remy Records
- Songwriters: Mizell, Larry / Gordon, Edward Larry
- Producer: Remy Shand

Remy Shand singles chronology
"Rocksteady" (2002)	"Where Are We Going" (2013)	"The Best In Me" (2014)

"Where Are We Going" is a song by Remy Shand, released on 17 May 2013 on Remy Records. It is the first single released by the musician since 2002's single "Rocksteady".

== Background ==
"Where Are We Going?" was composed by Edward Larry Gordon and Larry Mizell.

According to an article by The Globe and Mail dated June 3, 2013. Shand had covered Marvin Gaye's "Where Are We Going". The song was actually recorded in the past by Donald Byrd. Shand played all the instruments on the song and did all of the vocal backing. Shand did the mixing as well at Hollywood Dan's Sound Lair.

== Other versions ==
Donald Byrd recorded the song and it appeared on his Black Byrd album that was released on Blue Note BN-LA047-F in 1973.

Funk, Inc. recorded a version of the song which was included on their 1974 Priced to Sell album.

Marvin Gaye recorded his version of the song which appears on the Let's Get It On (Deluxe Edition) on Motown in 2001.

Aqua Stone Throne recorded a version which appeared on their 2017 Original Soul album.

Josh Rouse recorded a version which appears on the Radio Sessions Collection, Volume 1 album.

=== Sampled ===
Engelwood sampled Marvin Gaye's version of "Where Are We Going" for his "Puerto Rico" track which was released in 2016.
