= Urban Renewal (disambiguation) =

Urban renewal is a program of land redevelopment in areas of moderate to high density urban land use.

Urban Renewal may also refer to:

- Urban Renewal (tribute album), a tribute album to Phil Collins
- Urban Renewal (Funk, Inc. album)
- Urban Renewal (Tower of Power album)
