= Superfunk =

Superfunk may refer to:

- Superfunk (band), French electronica and dance group founded in 1998
- Superfunk (album), 1973 studio album by American band Funk, Inc
