= Hangin' Out =

Hangin' Out may refer to:

- Hangin' Out (Funk, Inc. album)
- Hangin' Out (Joe Newman and Joe Wilder album)
