= Take a Message =

Single by Remy Shand

from the album The Way I Feel
- B-side: "I Met Your Mercy"; "Mai"
- Released: 2001
- Genre: Soul music, rhythm and blues
- Length: 4:03
- Label: Universal (Canada); Motown (United States)
- Songwriter: Remy Shand
- Producer: Remy Shand

Remy Shand singles chronology
"Take a Message" (2001)	"The Way I Feel" (2001)

"Take a Message" is a song written, produced and performed by Canadian R&B singer Remy Shand, issued as the lead single from his only studio album The Way I Feel. Released in 2001, the song is Shand's only entry on the US Billboard Hot 100, peaking at number 89 in 2002. "Take a Message" was one of the top 25 most played songs on radio in Canada in 2002. In 2003, the song was nominated for Best Male R&B Vocal Performance and Best R&B Song at the Grammy Awards.

== Music video ==
The official music video for "Take a Message" was directed by Kedar Massenburg.

== Charts ==
=== Weekly charts ===
Weekly chart performance for "Take a Message"
Chart (2002)	Peak position
Canada (BDS)	9
US Billboard Hot 100	89
US Hot R&B/Hip-Hop Singles & Tracks (Billboard)	47

=== Year-end charts ===
Year-end chart performance for "Take a Message"
Chart (2002)	Position
Canada Radio (Nielsen Soundscan)	21
