= Funk, Inc. (album) =

Album by Funk, Inc.

Studio album by Funk, Inc.
- Released: 1971
- Recorded: 1971
- Studios: Van Gelder Studio, Englewood Cliffs, NJ
- Genre: Funk
- Length: 35:25
- Label: Prestige Records
- Producer: Bob Porter

Funk, Inc. chronology
Funk, Inc. (1971)	Chicken Lickin' (1972)

Professional ratings
Review scores
Source	Rating
Allmusic	link

Funk, Inc. is the first studio album by Funk, Inc., released in 1971.

== Track listing ==
No.	Title	Length
1.	"Kool Is Back (Gene Redd, Jr.)"	8:20
2.	"Bowlegs (Steve Weakley)"	7:55
3.	"Sister Janie (Bobby Watley)"	6:25
4.	"The Thrill Is Gone (Roy Hawkins, B.B. King)"	6:30
5.	"The Whipper (Watley)"	6:15

== Personnel ==
- Gene Barr – Tenor saxophone
- Cecil Hunt – Conga
- Jimmy Munford – Drums, Vocals
- Bobby Watley – Organ, Vocals
- Steve Weakley – Guitar

== Charts ==
=== Album ===
Chart (1972)	Peak position
Billboard Top Soul Albums	45

== Use in sampling ==
The track Kool is Back has been sampled 650 times in songs by other artists, most notably in the song Owner of a Lonely Heart by Yes.
