= Grammy Award for Best R&B Song =

Award

- "Folded" by Kehlani (pictured), Darius Dixson, Andre Harris, Donovan Knight, Don Mills, Khris Riddick-Tynes & Dawit Kamal Wilson is the most recent recipient
- Awarded for: Quality R&B songs
- Country: United States
- Presented by: National Academy of Recording Arts and Sciences
- First award: 1969
- Currently held by: Darius Dixson, Andre Harris, Kehlani Parrish, Donovan Knight, Don Mills, Khris Riddick-Tynes and Dawit Kamal Wilson, "Folded" (Kehlani) (2026)
- Website: grammy.com

The Grammy Award for Best R&B Song (sometimes known as the R&B Songwriter's Award) has been awarded since 1969. From 1969 to 2000, it was known as the Grammy Award for Best Rhythm and Blues Song. Beyoncé has won it a record five times, while Babyface, Stevie Wonder, Bill Withers and Alicia Keys have three wins each.

The award goes to the songwriter. If the winning song contains samples or interpolations of songs, the original songwriter and publisher can apply for a Winner's Certificate. Only three people have won in consecutive years Stevie Wonder in ('74 & '75); Johnta Austin in ('06 & 07) also SZA in (' 24 & '25). The performing artist does not receive an award unless they are also credited as a songwriter.

Years reflect the year in which the Grammy Awards were presented, for music released in the previous year.

== Recipients ==
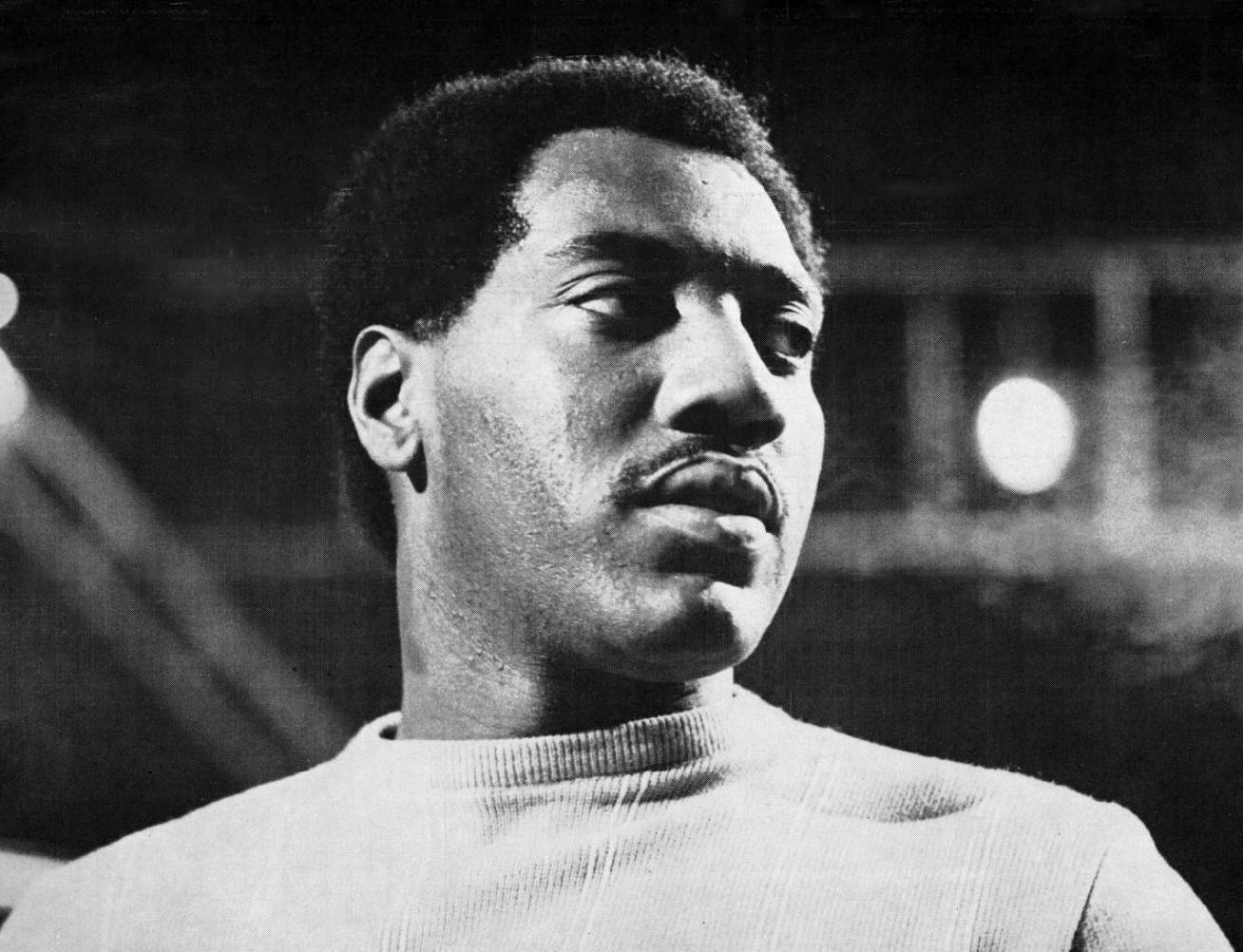
Otis Redding, one of the inaugural winners of the award.

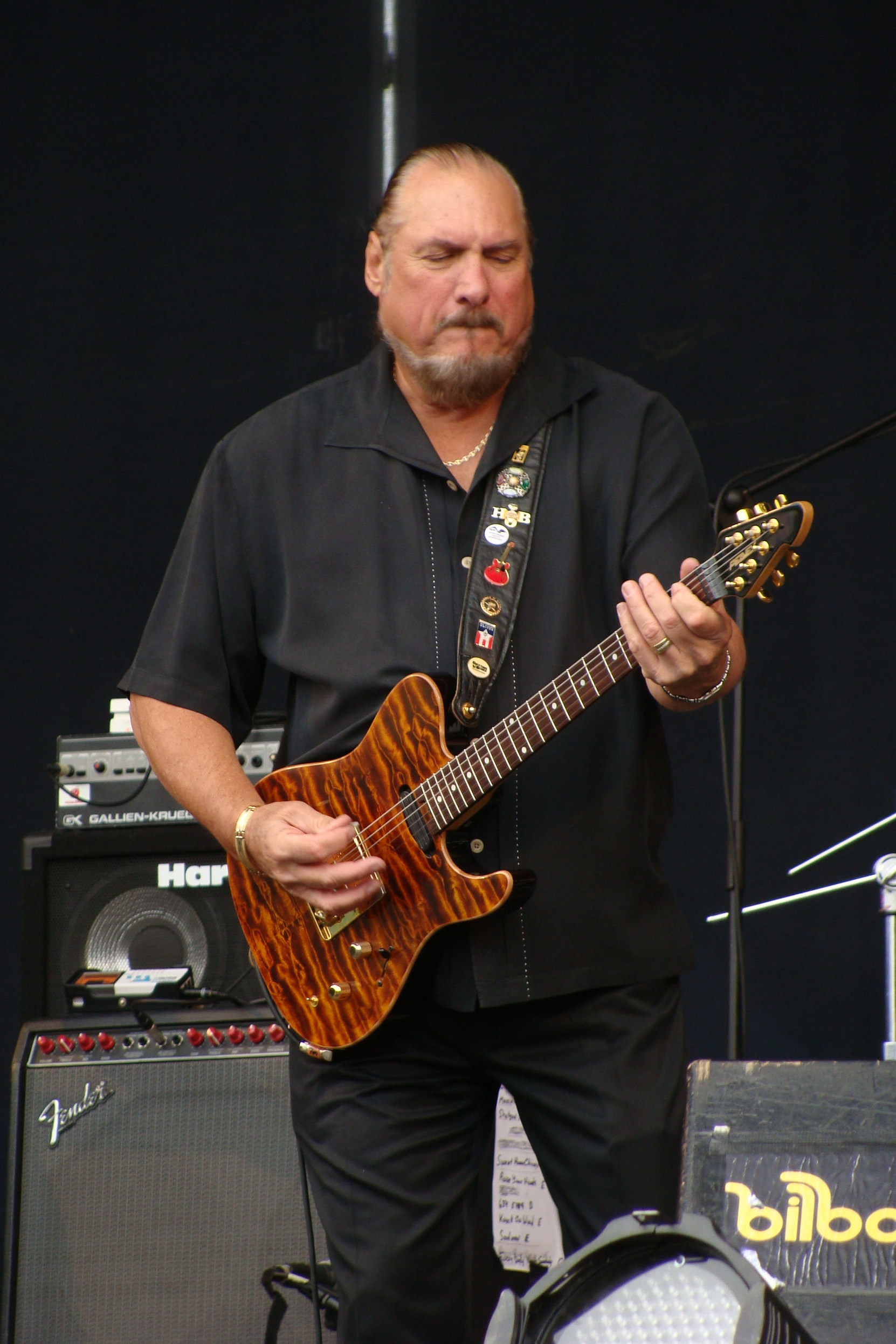
Steve Cropper, one of the inaugural winners of the award.

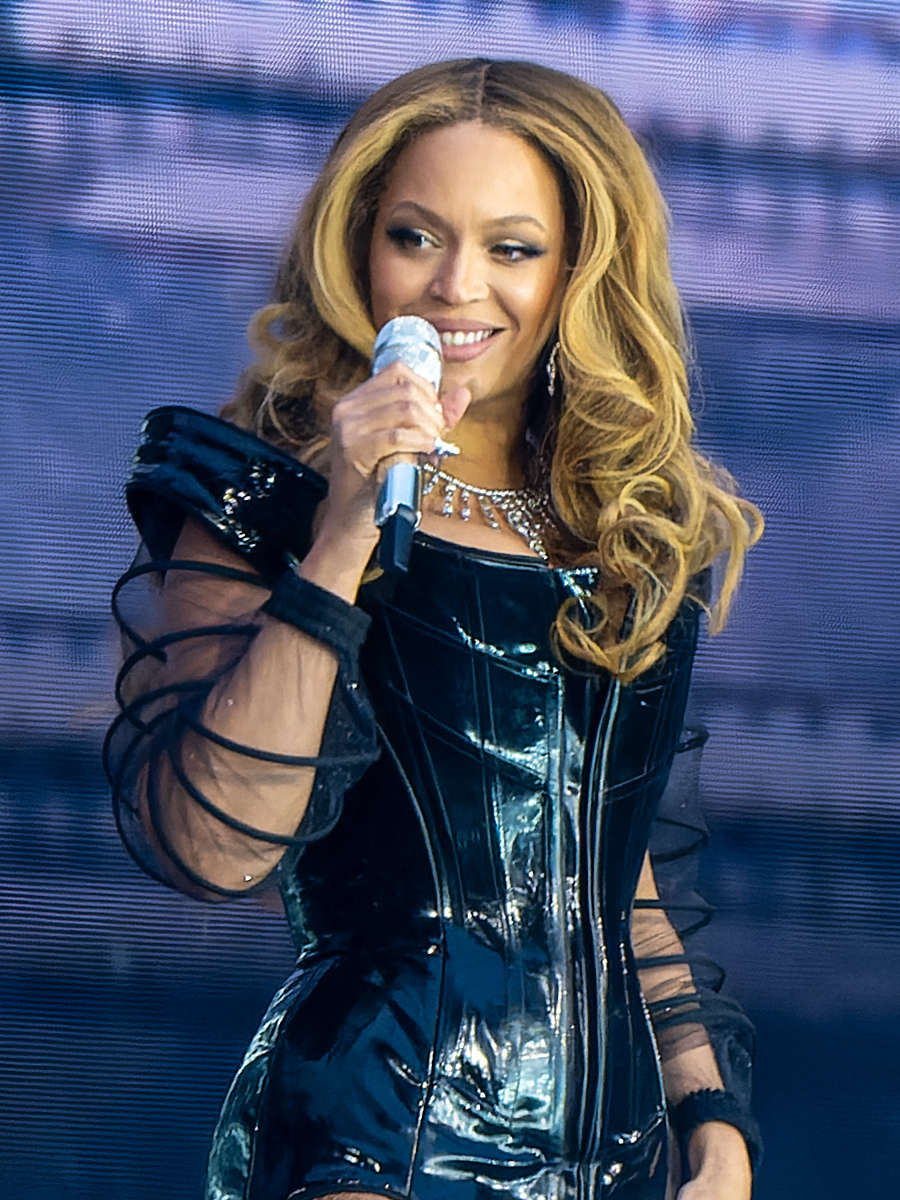
Five-time award-winning artist Beyoncé, she is the most awarded artist in the category.

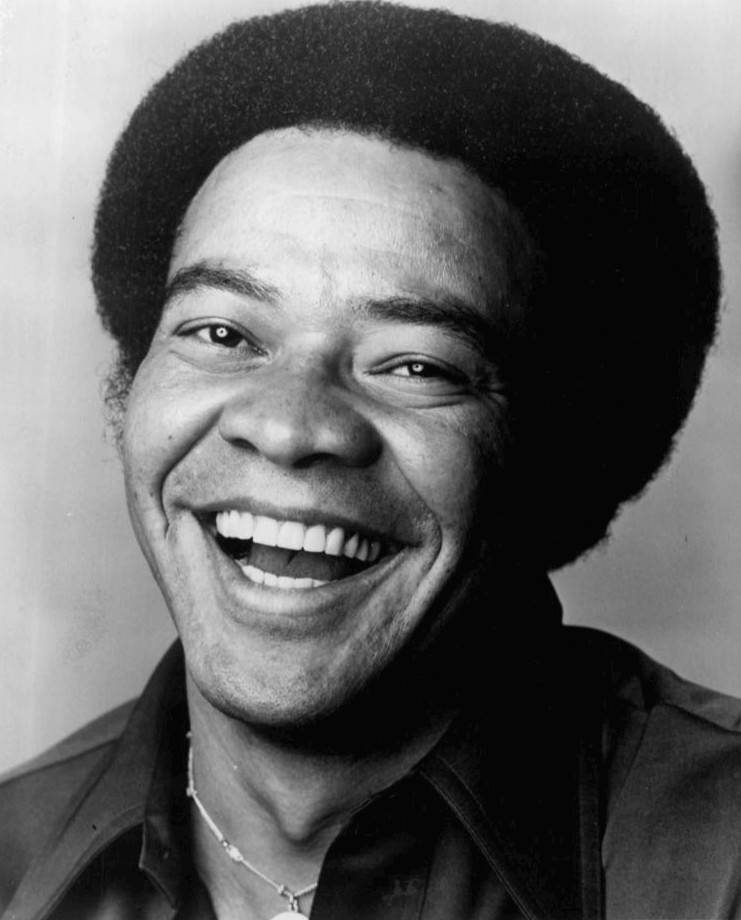
Three-time award winner, Bill Withers.

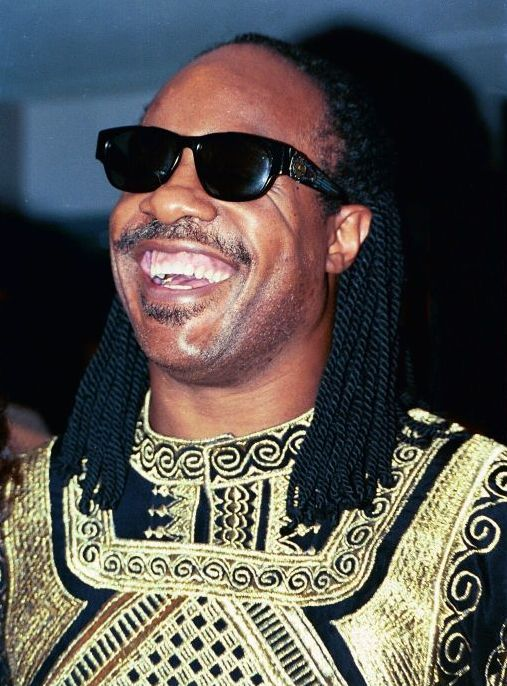
Three-time award winner, Stevie Wonder.

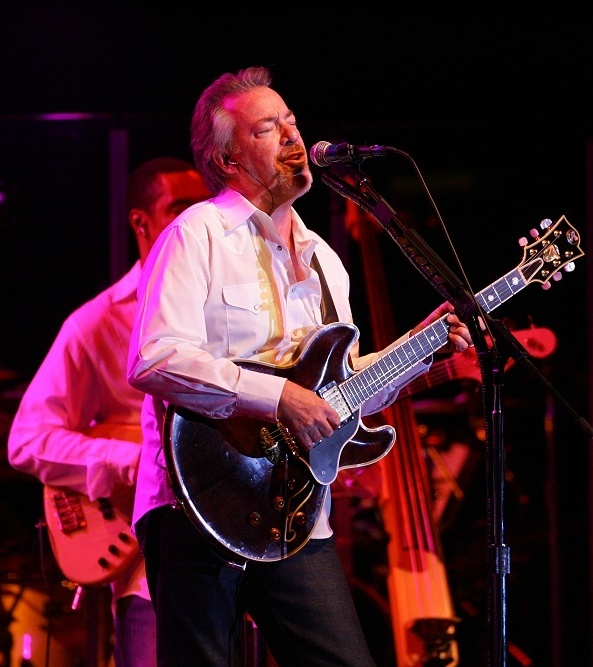
1977 co-winner Boz Scaggs.

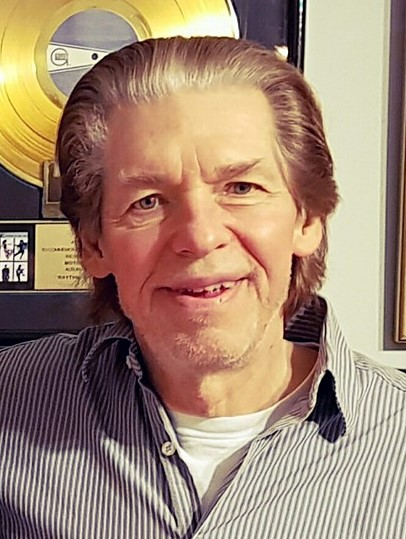
Two-time winner Jay Graydon.

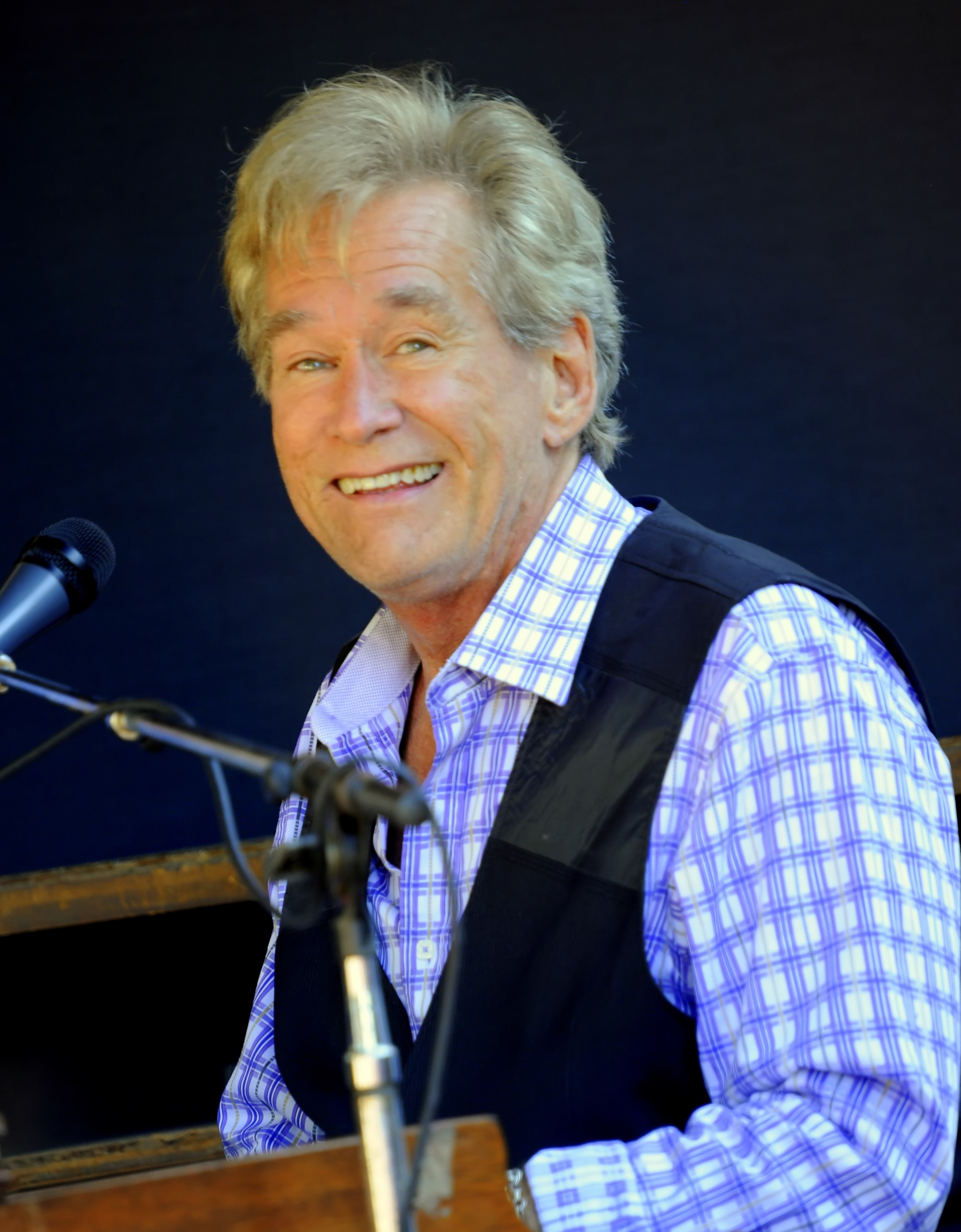
Two-time winner Bill Champlin.

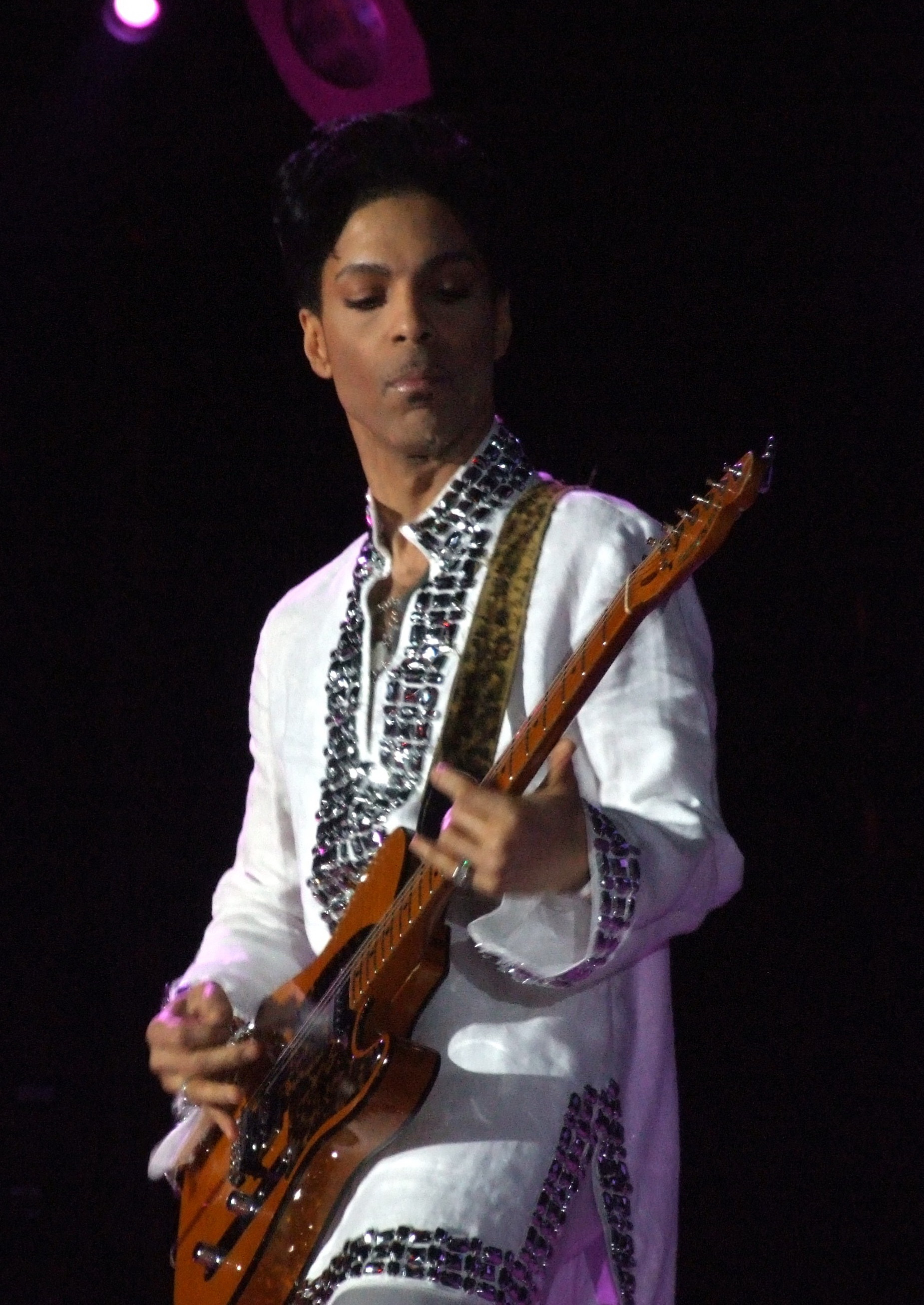
1985 winner, Prince.

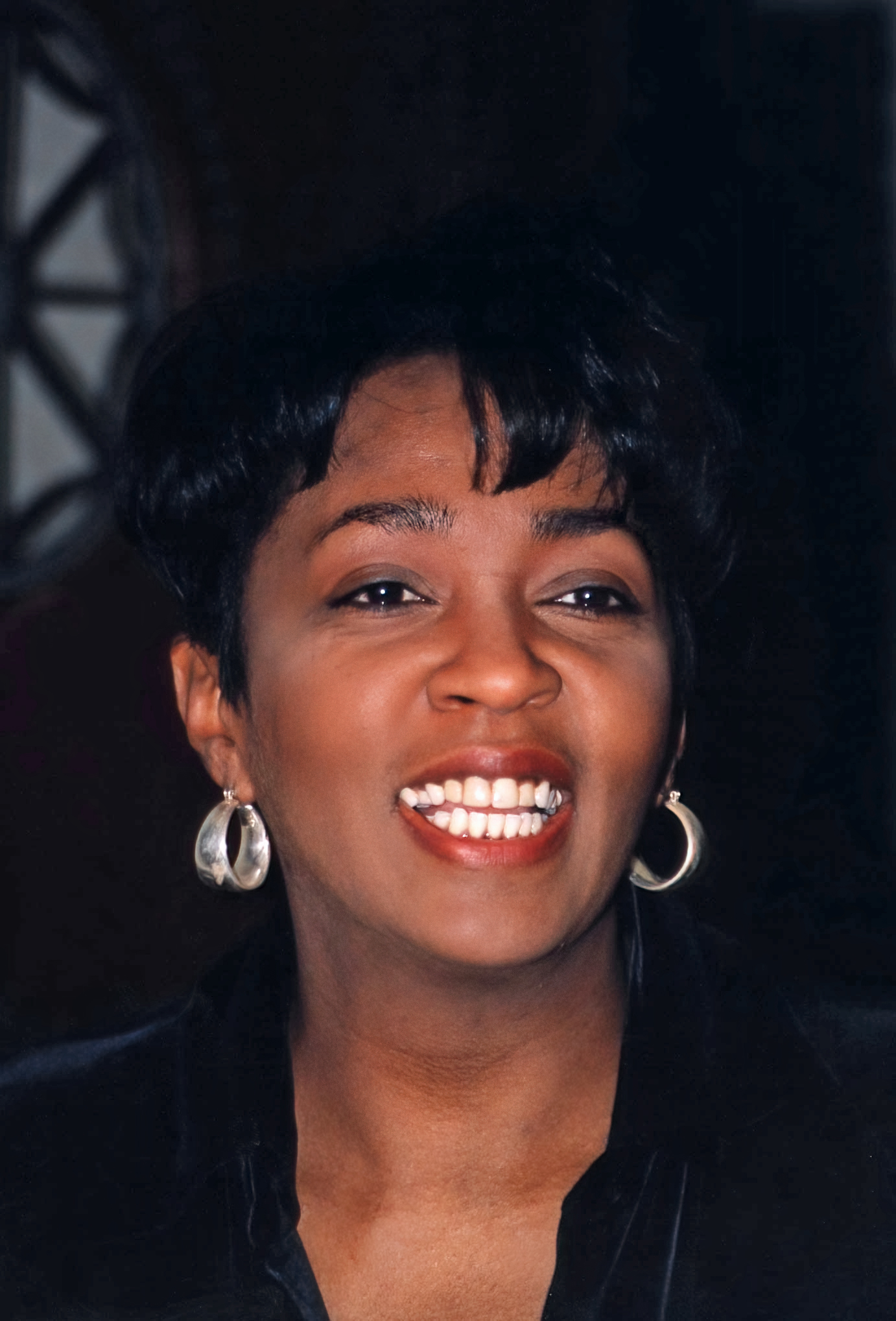
Two-time winner, Anita Baker.

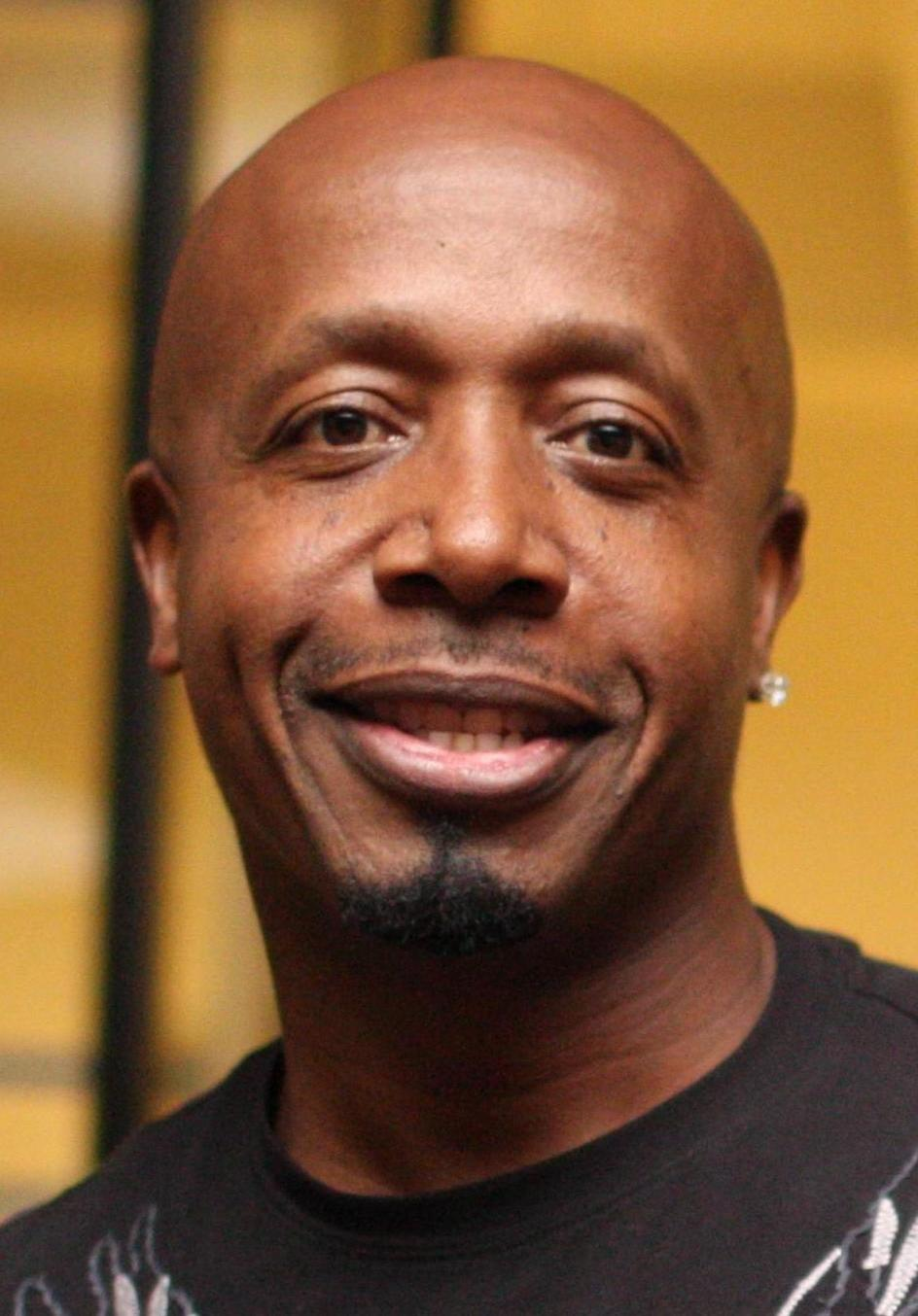
1991 co-winner, MC Hammer.

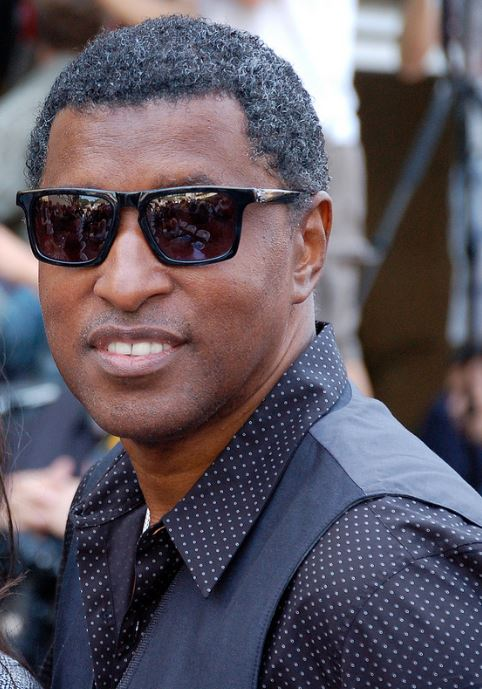
Four-time winner Babyface holds the record of most nominations in the category, with fourteen.

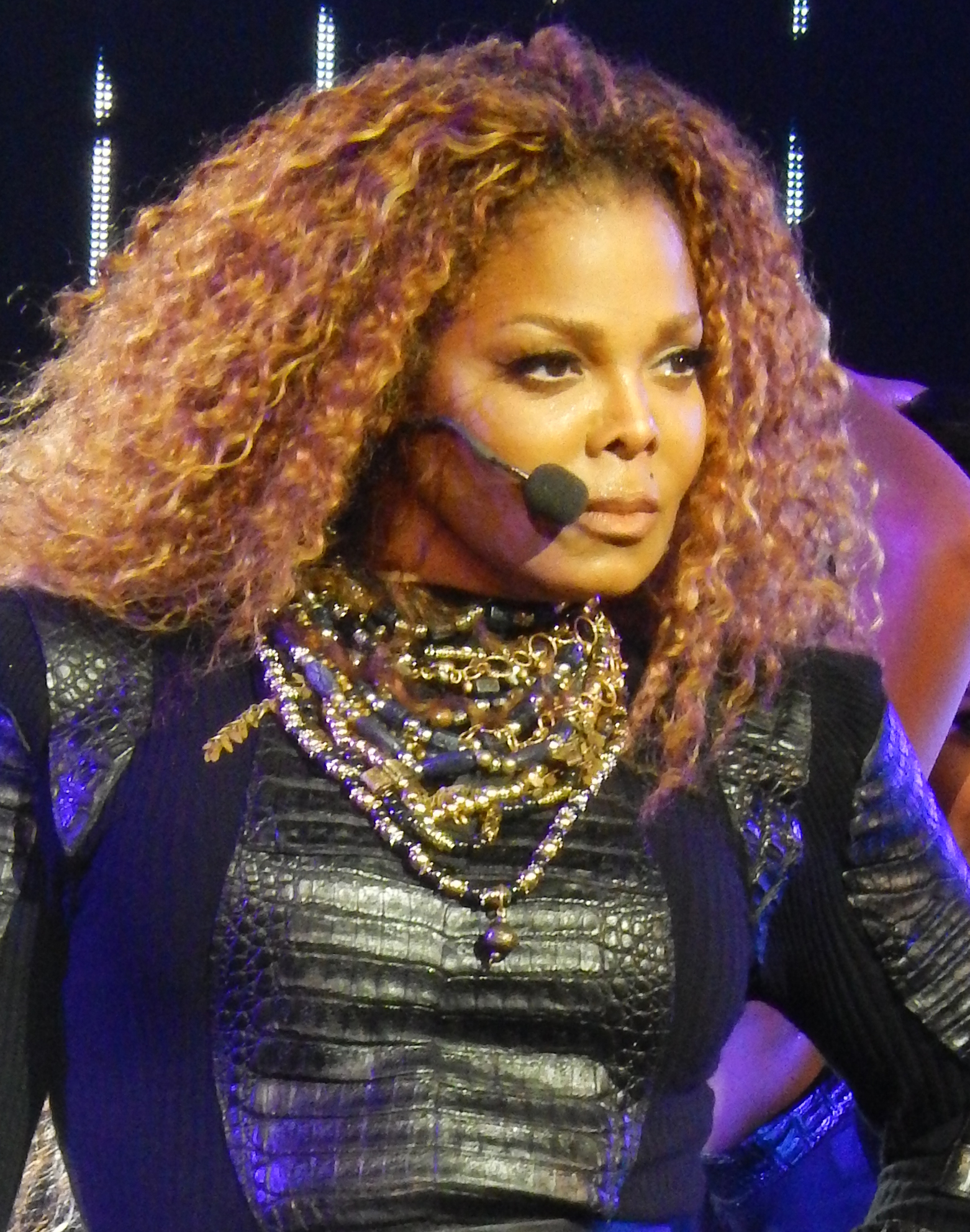
1994 winner, Janet Jackson.

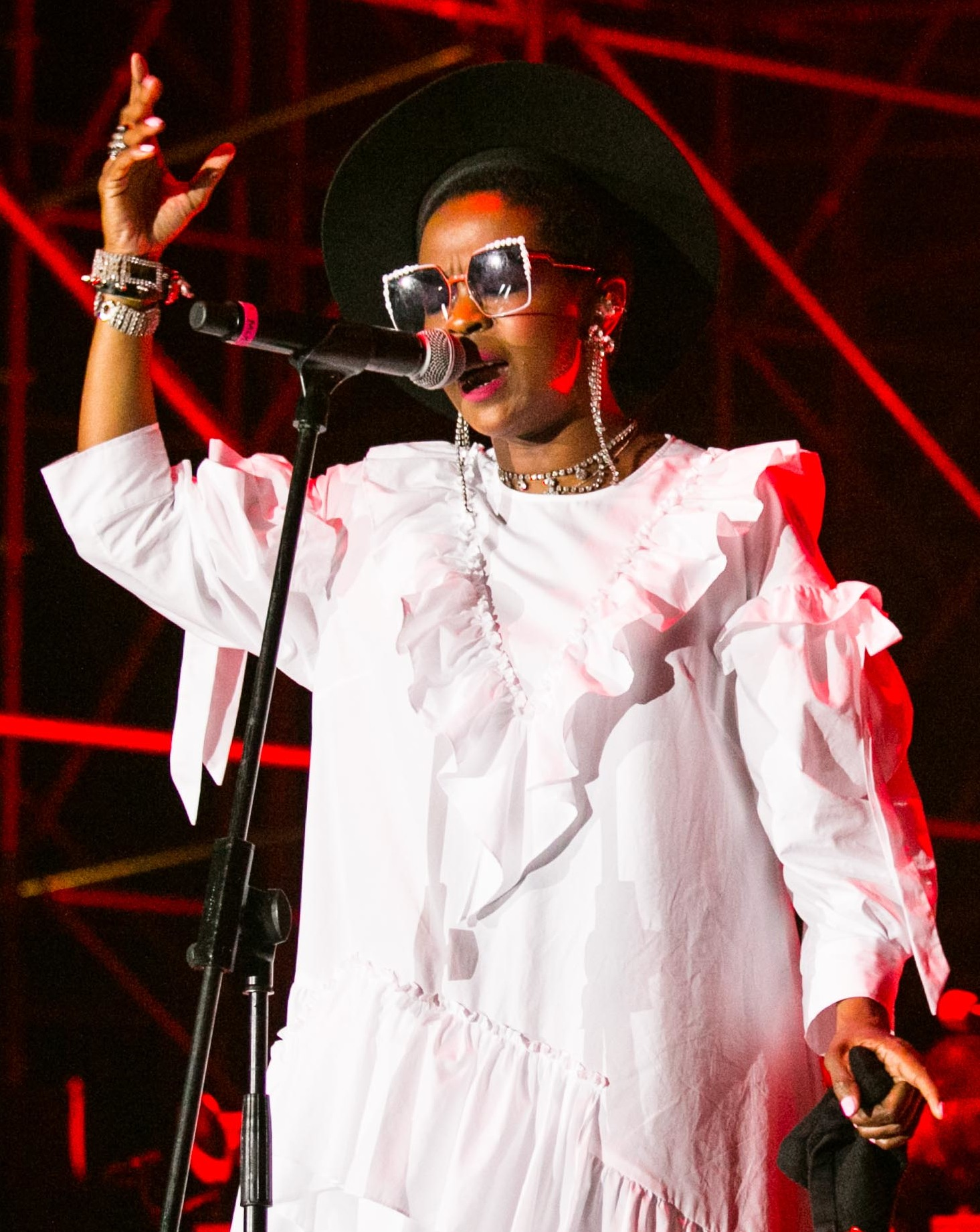
1999 winner, Lauryn Hill.

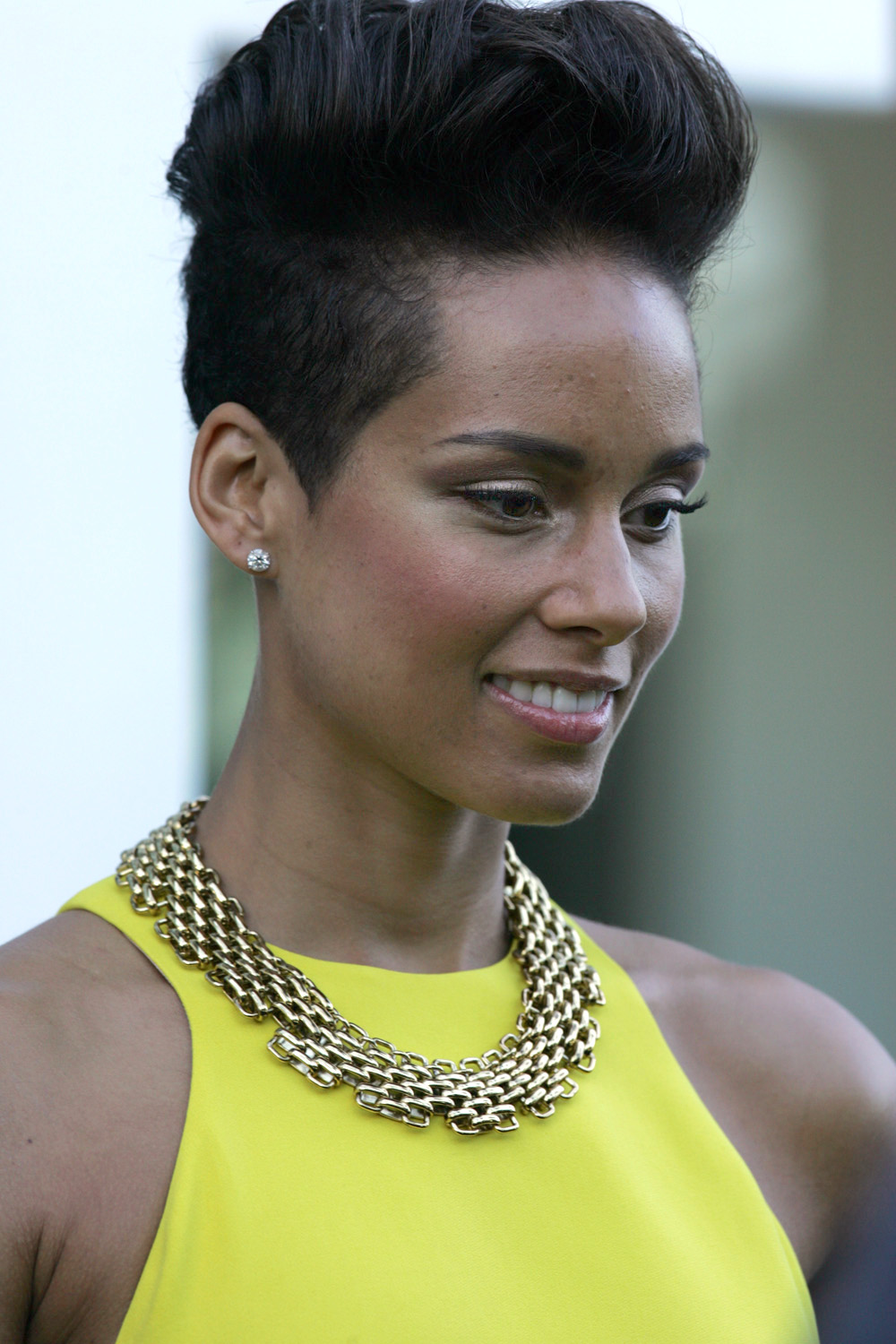
Three-time winner Alicia Keys.

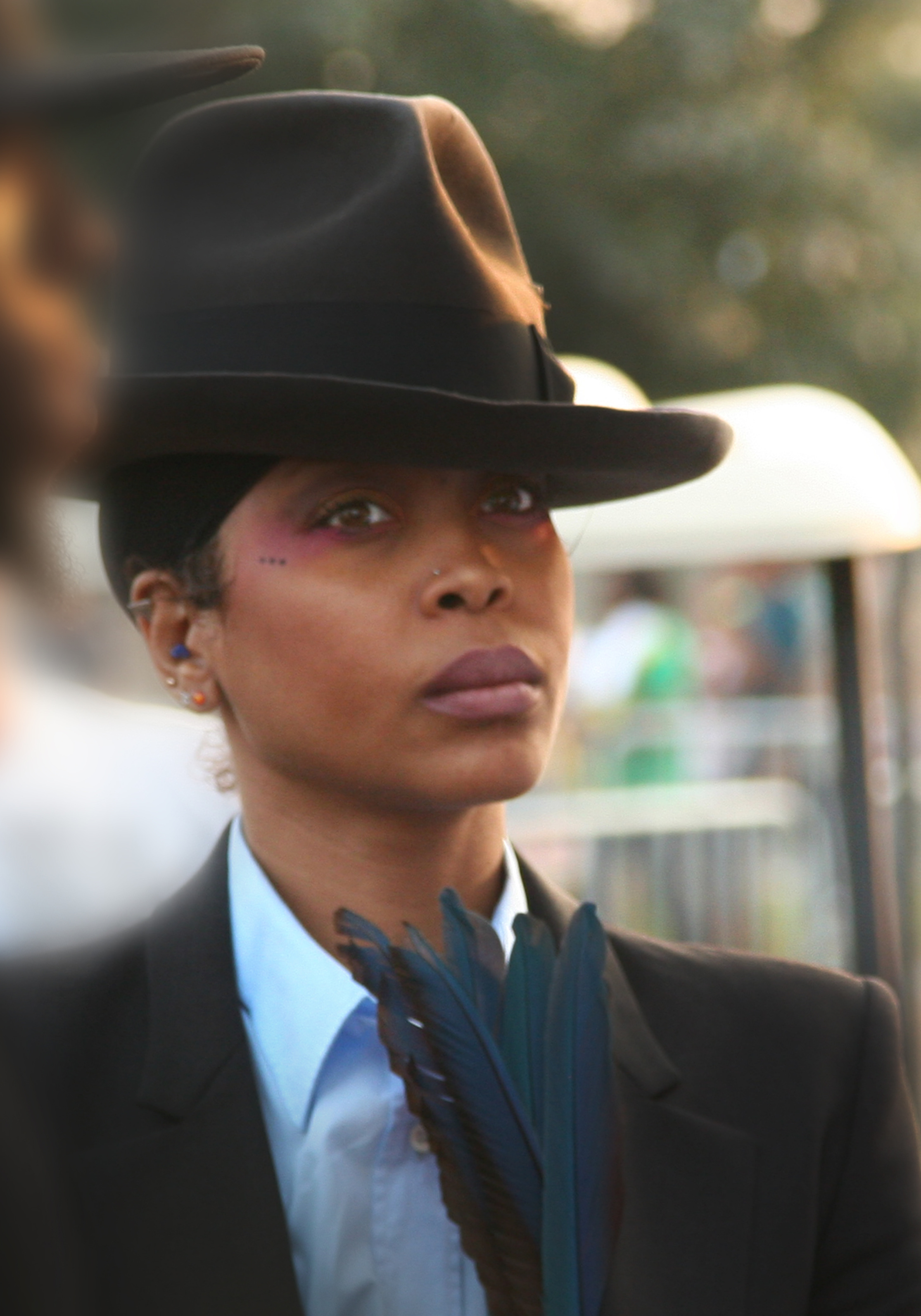
2003 winner, Erykah Badu.

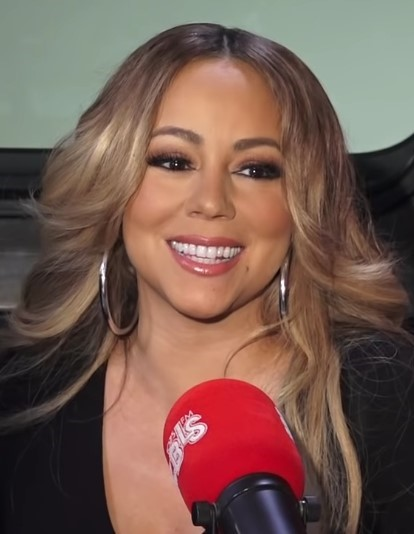
2006 winner, Mariah Carey.

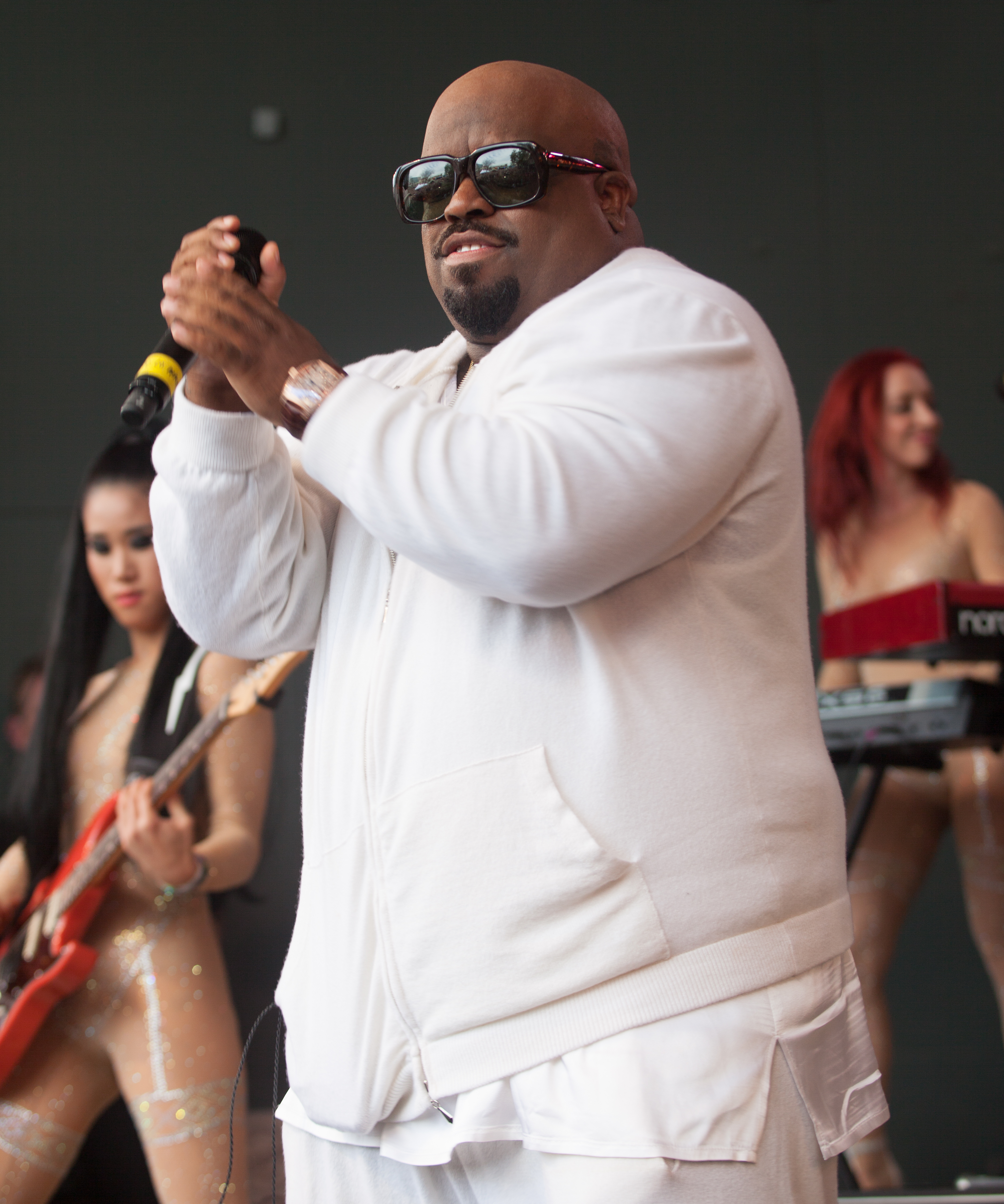
2012 co-winner, CeeLo Green.

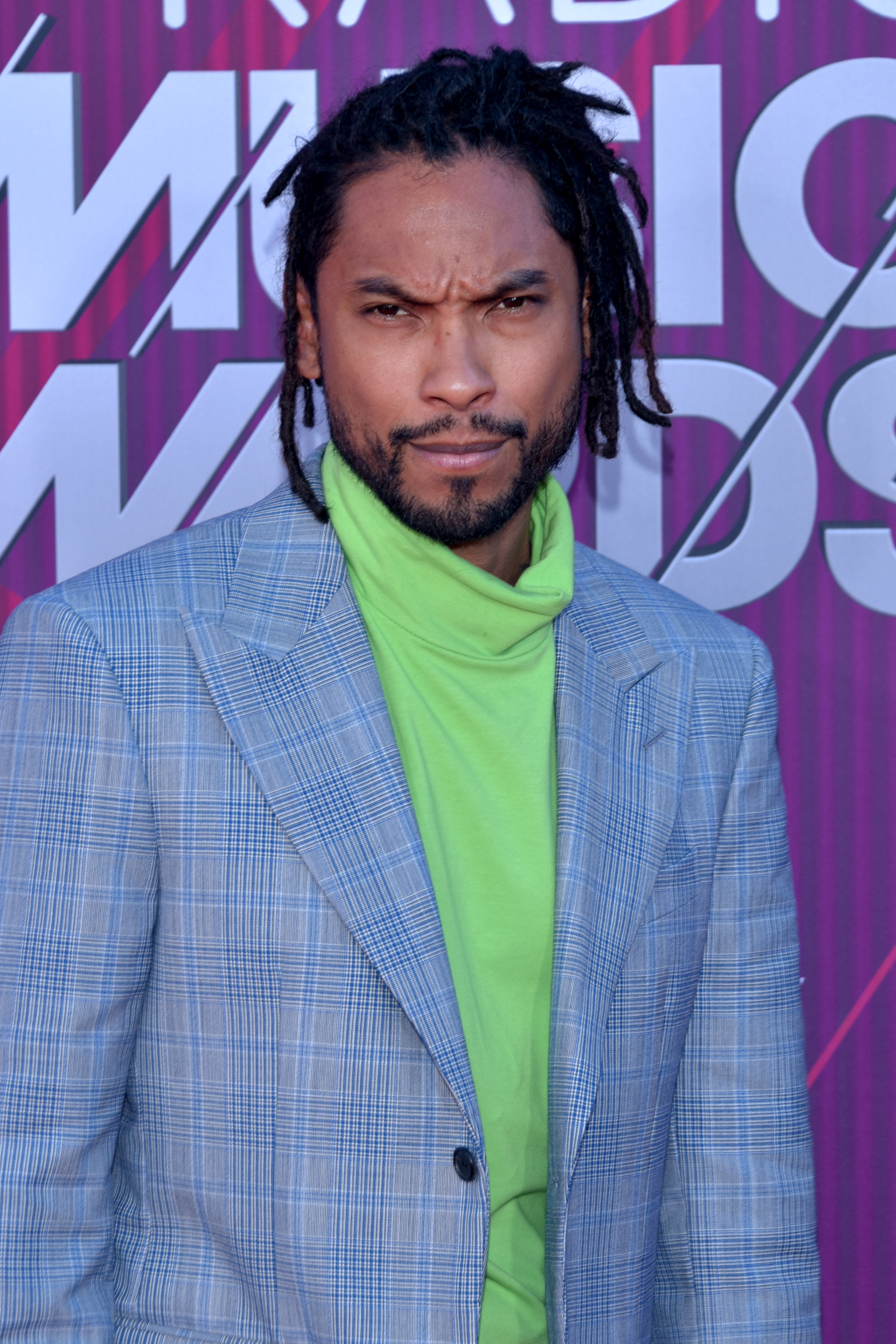
2013 winner, Miguel.

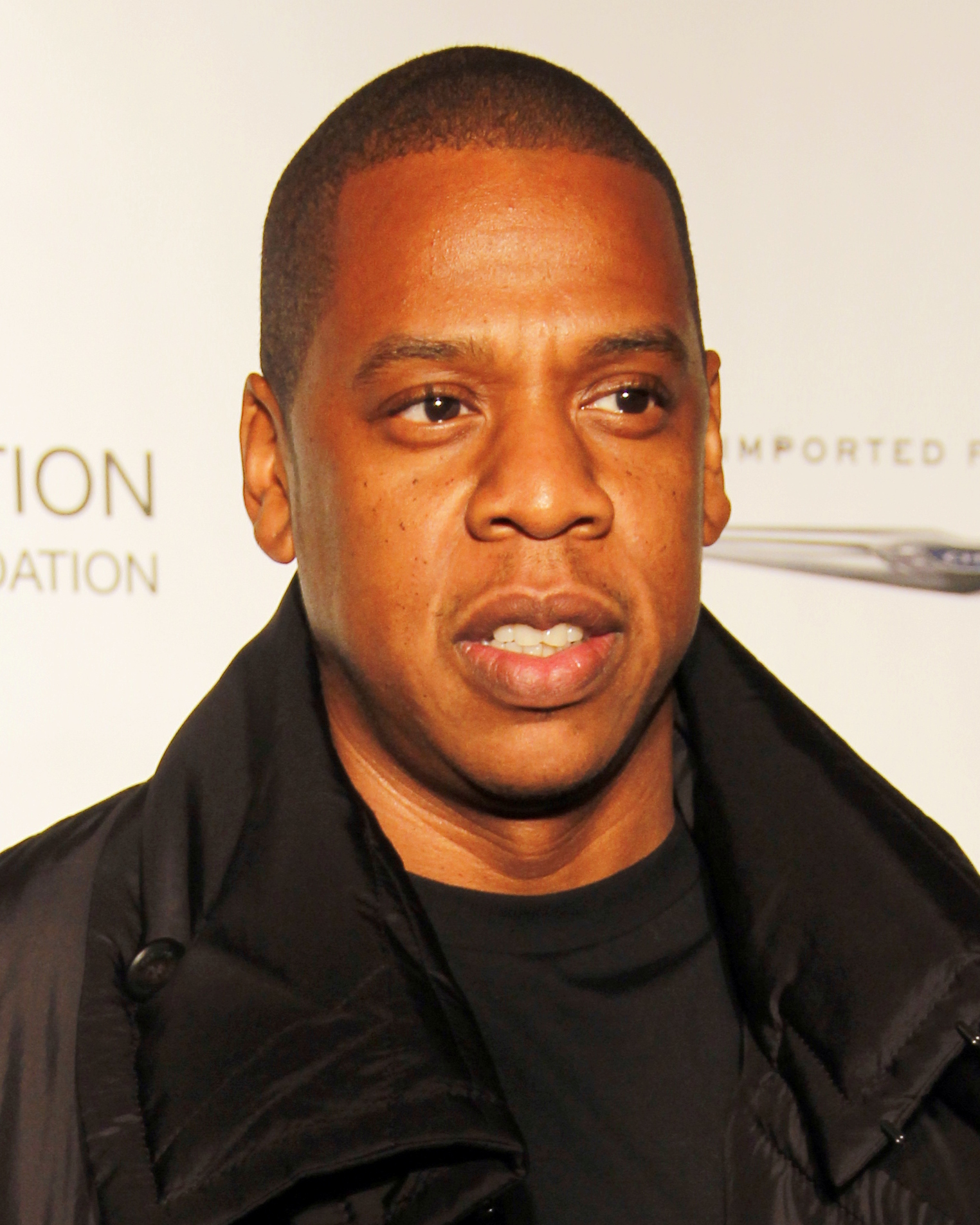
Two-time winner Jay Z.

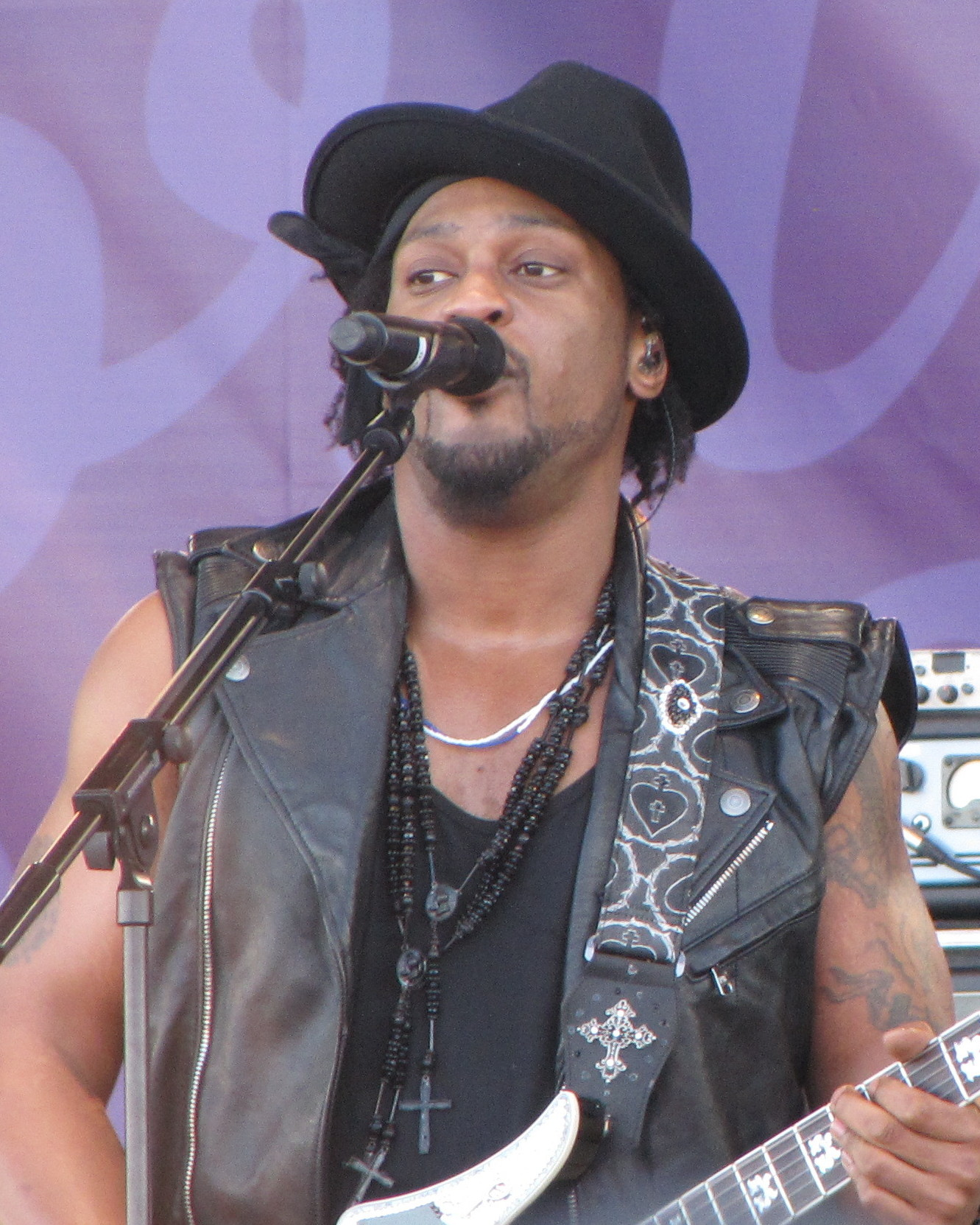
2016 winner, D'Angelo.

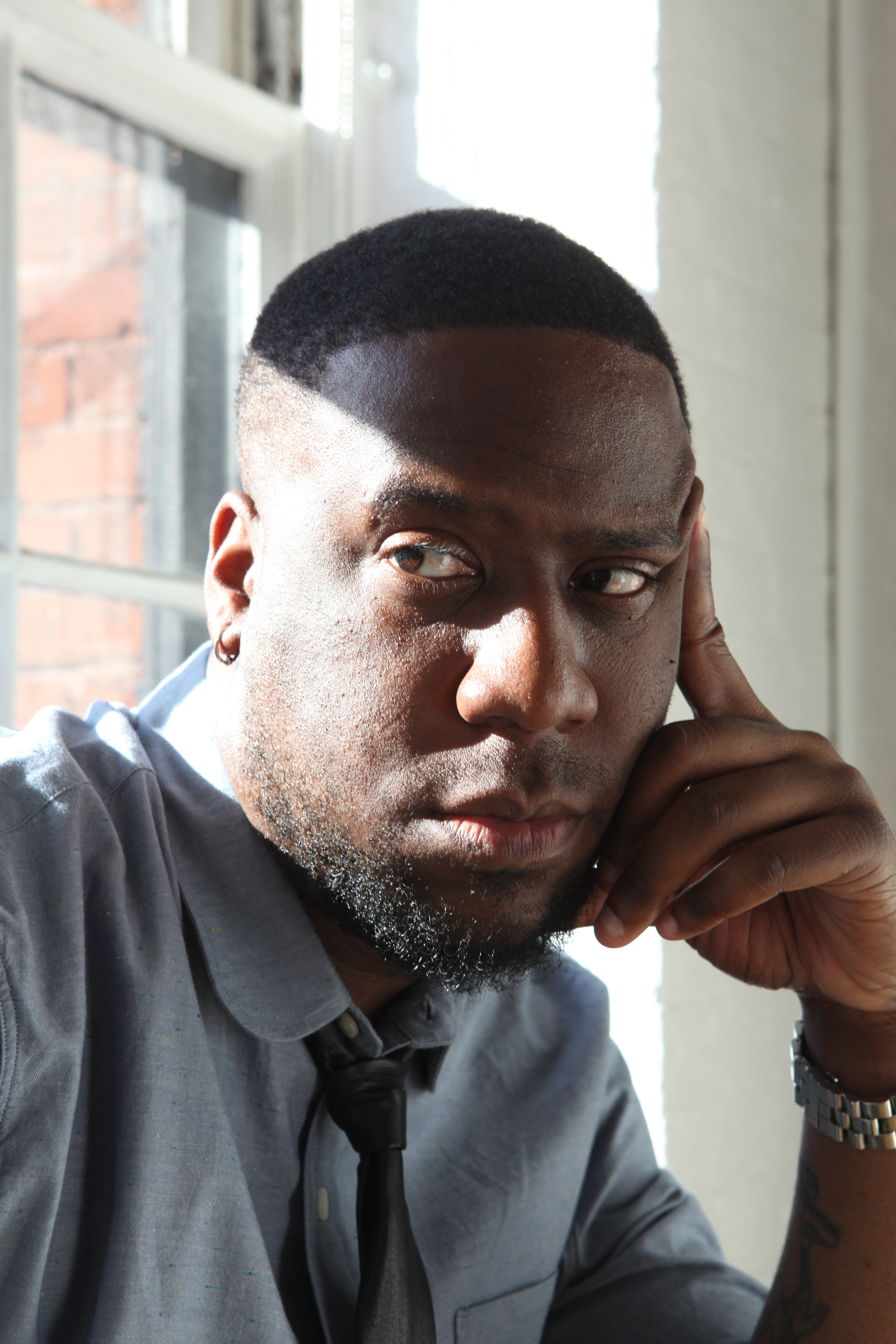
2021 co-winner, Robert Glasper.

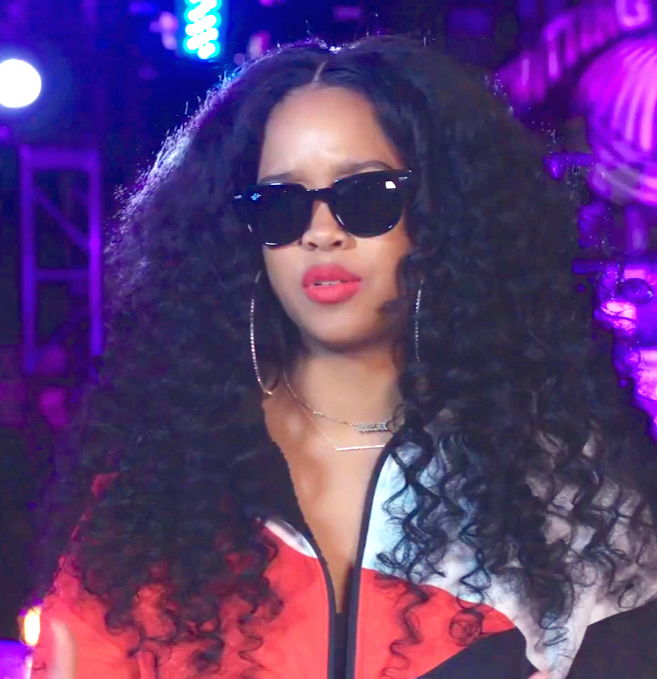
2021 co-winner, H.E.R.

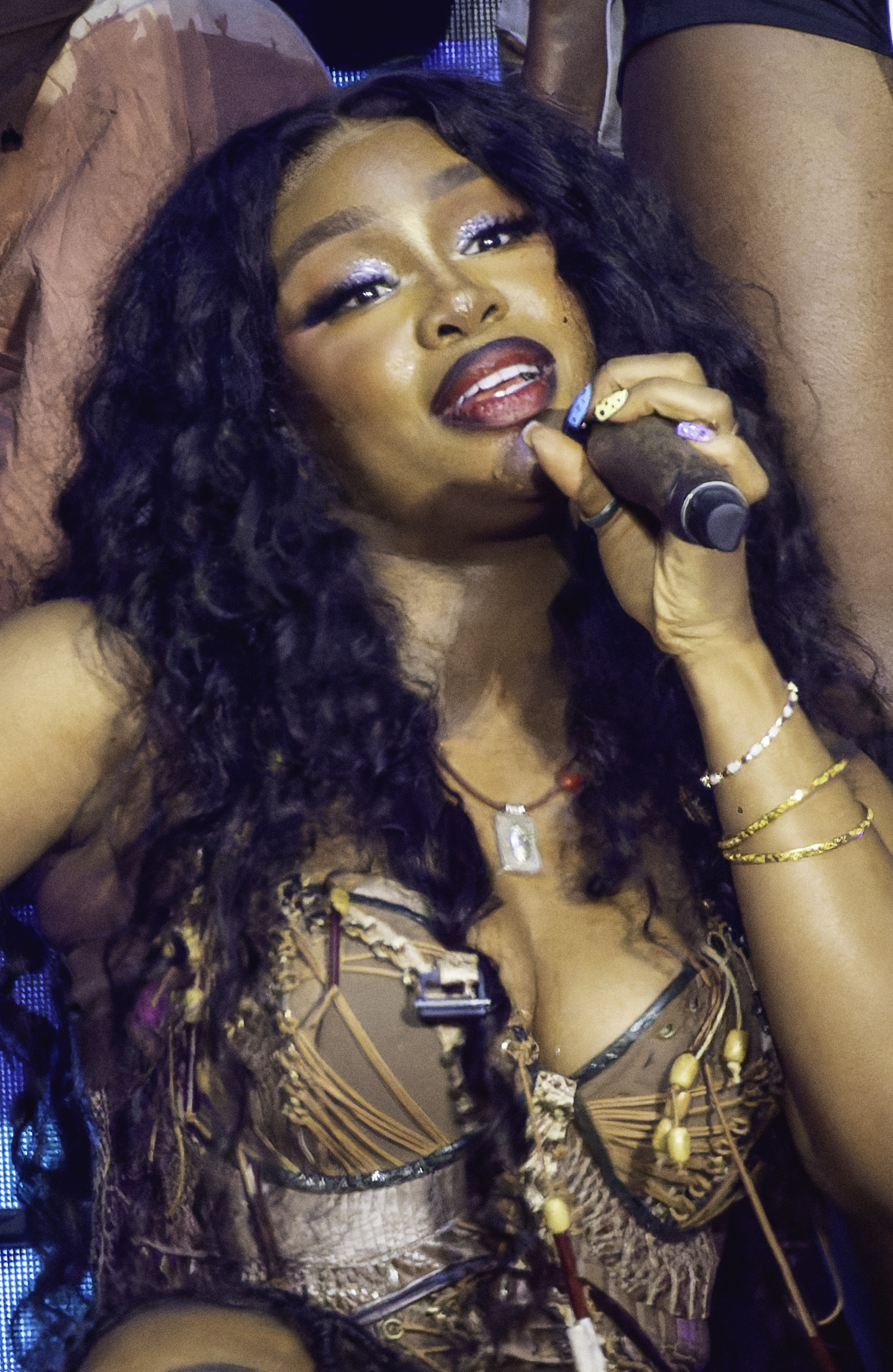
SZA has won this award twice consecutively in 2024 and 2025.

=== 1960s ===
Year^{[I]}	Song	Songwriter(s)	Artist(s)
1969
1969	"(Sittin' On) The Dock of the Bay"	Steve Cropper and Otis Redding	Otis Redding
1969	"Chain of Fools"	Don Covay	Aretha Franklin
1969	"I Wish It Would Rain"	Roger Penzabene, Barrett Strong and Norman Whitfield	The Temptations
1969	"Pickin' Wild Mountain Berries"	Bob McRee, Clifton Thomas and Edward Thomas	Peggy Scott and Jo Jo Benson
1969	"Who's Making Love"	Homer Banks, Bettye Crutcher, Donald Davis and Raymond Jackson	Johnnie Taylor

=== 1970s ===
Year^{[I]}	Song	Songwriter(s)	Artist(s)
1970
1970	"Color Him Father"	Richard Spencer	The Winstons
1970	"Backfield in Motion"	Melvin Harden and Herbert McPherson	Mel & Tim
1970	"I'd Rather Be an Old Man's Sweetheart"	Clarence Carter, George Jackson and Raymond Moore	Candi Staton
1970	"It's Your Thing"	Ronald Isley, Rudolph Isley and O'Kelly Isley Jr.	The Isley Brothers
1970	"Only the Strong Survive"	Jerry Butler, Kenny Gamble and Leon Huff	Jerry Butler
1971
1971	"Patches"	Ronald Dunbar and General Johnson	Clarence Carter
1971	"Didn't I (Blow Your Mind This Time)"	Thom Bell and William Hart	The Delfonics
1971	"Groovy Situation"	Herman Davis and Russell Lewis	Gene Chandler
1971	"Signed, Sealed, Delivered"	Lee Garrett, Lula Hardaway, Stevie Wonder and Syreeta Wright	Stevie Wonder
1971	"Somebody's Been Sleeping"	Angelo Bond, General Johnson and Greg Perry	100 Proof
1972
1972	"Ain't No Sunshine"	Bill Withers	Bill Withers
1972	"If I Were Your Woman"	Clay McMurray, Pamela Sawyer and Laverne Ware	Gladys Knight and the Pips
1972	"Mr. Big Stuff"	Joseph Broussard, Carrol Washington and Ralph Williams	Jean Knight
1972	"Never Can Say Goodbye"	Clifton Davis	Isaac Hayes / The Jackson 5
1972	"Smiling Faces Sometimes"	Barrett Strong and Norman Whitfield	The Undisputed Truth
1973
1973	"Papa Was a Rollin' Stone"	Barrett Strong and Norman Whitfield	The Temptations
1973	"Back Stabbers"	Leon Huff, Gene McFadden and John Whitehead	The O'Jays
1973	"Everybody Plays the Fool"	J.R. Bailey, Rudy Clark and Kenny Williams	The Main Ingredient
1973	"Freddie's Dead"	Curtis Mayfield	Curtis Mayfield
1973	"Me and Mrs. Jones"	Kenneth Gamble, Cary Gilbert and Leon Huff	Billy Paul
1974
1974	"Superstition"	Stevie Wonder	Stevie Wonder
1974	"The Cisco Kid"	War	War
1974	"Family Affair"	Sylvester Stewart	Sly and the Family Stone
1974	"Love Train"	Kenneth Gamble and Leon Huff	The O'Jays
1974	"Midnight Train to Georgia"	Jim Weatherly	Gladys Knight and the Pips
1975
1975	"Living for the City"	Stevie Wonder	Stevie Wonder
1975	"Dancing Machine"	Hal Davis, Don Fletcher and Dean Parks	The Jackson 5
1975	"For the Love of Money"	Kenneth Gamble, Leon Huff and Anthony Jackson	The O'Jays
1975	"Rock Your Baby"	Harry Wayne Casey	George McCrae
1975	"Tell Me Something Good"	Stevie Wonder	Rufus
1976
1976	"Where Is the Love"	Harry Wayne Casey, Willie Clarke, Richard Finch and Betty Wright	Betty Wright
1976	"Ease On down the Road"	Charlie Smalls	Diana Ross and Michael Jackson
1976	"Get Down Tonight"	Harry Wayne Casey and Richard Finch	KC and the Sunshine Band
1976	"That's the Way (I Like It)"	Harry Wayne Casey and Richard Finch	KC and the Sunshine Band
1976	"Walking in Rhythm"	Barney Perry	The Blackbyrds
1977
1977	"Lowdown"	David Paich and Boz Scaggs	Boz Scaggs
1977	"Disco Lady"	Donald Davis, Harvey Scales and Al Vance	Johnnie Taylor
1977	"Love Hangover"	Marilyn McLeod and Pam Sawyer	Diana Ross
1977	"Misty Blue"	Bob Montgomery	Dorothy Moore
1977	"(Shake, Shake, Shake) Shake Your Booty"	Harry Wayne Casey and Richard Finch	KC and the Sunshine Band
1978
1978	"You Make Me Feel Like Dancing"	Vini Poncia and Leo Sayer	Leo Sayer
1978	"Best of My Love"	Al McKay and Maurice White	The Emotions
1978	"Brick House"	William King, Ronald LaPread, Thomas McClary, Walter Orange, Lionel Richie and Milan Williams	Commodores
1978	"Don't Leave Me This Way"	Kenneth Gamble, Cary Gilbert and Leon Huff	Thelma Houston
1978	"Easy"	Lionel Richie	Commodores
1979
1979	"Last Dance"	Paul Jabara	Donna Summer
1979	"Boogie Oogie Oogie"	Janice M. Johnson and Perry Kibble	A Taste of Honey
1979	"Dance, Dance, Dance"	Bernard Edwards, Kenny Lehman and Nile Rodgers	Chic
1979	"Fantasy"	Eddie del Barrio, Maurice White and Verdine White	Earth, Wind & Fire
1979	"Use Ta Be My Girl"	Kenneth Gamble and Leon Huff	The O'Jays

=== 1980s ===
Year^{[I]}	Song	Songwriter(s)	Artist(s)
1980
1980	"After the Love Has Gone"	Bill Champlin, David Foster and Jay Graydon	Earth, Wind & Fire
1980	"Ain't No Stoppin' Us Now"	Jerry Cohen and Gene McFadden	McFadden & Whitehead
1980	"Deja Vu"	Adrienne Anderson and Isaac Hayes	Dionne Warwick
1980	"Reunited"	Dino Fekaris and Freddie Perren	Peaches & Herb
1980	"We Are Family"	Bernard Edwards and Nile Rodgers	Sister Sledge
1981
1981	"Never Knew Love Like This Before"	Reggie Lucas and James Mtume	Stephanie Mills
1981	"Give Me the Night"	Rod Temperton	George Benson
1981	"Let's Get Serious"	Lee Garrett and Stevie Wonder	Jermaine Jackson
1981	"Shining Star"	Leo Graham and Paul Richmond	The Manhattans
1981	"Upside Down"	Bernard Edwards and Nile Rodgers	Diana Ross
1982
1982	"Just the Two of Us"	Ralph MacDonald, William Salter and Bill Withers	Grover Washington Jr. and Bill Withers
1982	"Ai No Corrida"	Chas Jankel and Kenny Young	Quincy Jones and Dune
1982	"Lady (You Bring Me Up)"	Harold Hudson, Shirley King and William King	Commodores
1982	"She's a Bad Mama Jama (She's Built, She's Stacked)"	Leon Haywood	Carl Carlton
1982	"When She Was My Girl"	Marc Blatte and Larry Gottlieb	Four Tops
1983
1983	"Turn Your Love Around"	Bill Champlin, Jay Graydon and Steve Lukather	George Benson
1983	"Do I Do"	Stevie Wonder	Stevie Wonder
1983	"It's Gonna Take a Miracle"	Teddy Randazzo, Lou Stallman and Bobby Weinstein	Deniece Williams
1983	"Let It Whip"	Reggie Andrews and Leon "Ndugu" Chancler	Dazz Band
1983	"Sexual Healing"	Odell Brown and Marvin Gaye	Marvin Gaye
1983	"That Girl"	Stevie Wonder	Stevie Wonder
1984
1984	"Billie Jean"	Michael Jackson	Michael Jackson
1984	"Ain't Nobody"	Hawk Wolinski	Rufus and Chaka Khan
1984	"Electric Avenue"	Eddy Grant	Eddy Grant
1984	"PYT (Pretty Young Thing)"	James Ingram and Quincy Jones	Michael Jackson
1984	"Wanna Be Startin' Somethin'"	Michael Jackson	Michael Jackson
1985
1985	"I Feel for You"	Prince	Chaka Khan
1985	"Caribbean Queen (No More Love on the Run)"	Keith Diamond and Billy Ocean	Billy Ocean
1985	"Dancing in the Sheets"	Dean Pitchford and Bill Wolfer	Shalamar
1985	"The Glamorous Life"	Sheila E.	Sheila E.
1985	"Yah Mo B There"	James Ingram, Quincy Jones, Michael McDonald and Rod Temperton	James Ingram and Michael McDonald
1986
1986	"Freeway of Love"	Jeffrey Cohen and Narada Michael Walden	Aretha Franklin
1986	"New Attitude"	Jon Gilutin, Bunny Hull and Sharon Robinson	Patti LaBelle
1986	"Nightshift"	Franne Golde, Dennis Lambert and Walter Orange	Commodores
1986	"Through the Fire"	David Foster, Tom Keane and Cynthia Weil	Chaka Khan
1986	"You Give Good Love"	LaLa	Whitney Houston
1987
1987	"Sweet Love"	Anita Baker, Gary Bias and Louis A. Johnson	Anita Baker
1987	"Give Me the Reason"	Nat Adderley Jr. and Luther Vandross	Luther Vandross
1987	"Kiss"	Prince	Prince & The Revolution
1987	"Living in America"	Dan Hartman and Charlie Midnight	James Brown
1987	"What Have You Done For Me Lately"	Janet Jackson, Jimmy Jam and Terry Lewis	Janet Jackson
1988
1988	"Lean on Me"	Bill Withers	Club Nouveau
1988	"Casanova"	Reggie Calloway	LeVert
1988	"Just to See Her"	Jimmy George and Lou Pardini	Smokey Robinson
1988	"Skeletons"	Stevie Wonder	Stevie Wonder
1988	"U Got the Look"	Prince	Prince and Sheena Easton
1989
1989	"Giving You the Best That I Got"	Anita Baker, Randy Holland and Skip Scarborough	Anita Baker
1989	"Any Love"	Marcus Miller and Luther Vandross	Luther Vandross
1989	"Don't Be Cruel"	Babyface, L.A. Reid and Daryl Simmons	Bobby Brown
1989	"I'll Always Love You"	Jimmy George	Taylor Dayne
1989	"Just Got Paid"	Gene Griffin and Johnny Kemp	Johnny Kemp

=== 1990s ===
Year^{[I]}	Song	Songwriter(s)	Artist(s)
1990
1990	"If You Don't Know Me by Now"	Kenny Gamble and Leon Huff	Simply Red
1990	"Every Little Step"	Babyface and L.A. Reid	Bobby Brown
1990	"Miss You Much"	Jimmy Jam and Terry Lewis	Janet Jackson
1990	"Superwoman"	Babyface, L.A. Reid and Daryl Simmons	Karyn White
1990	"When a Man Loves a Woman"	Calvin Lewis and Andrew Wright	Joe Cocker
1991
1991	"U Can't Touch This"	MC Hammer, Rick James and Alonzo Miller	MC Hammer
1991	"Alright"	Janet Jackson, Jimmy Jam and Terry Lewis	Janet Jackson
1991	"Here and Now"	David L. Elliott and Terry Steele	Luther Vandross
1991	"I'll Be Good to You"	George Johnson, Louis A. Johnson and Sonora Sam	Ray Charles and Chaka Khan
1991	"My, My, My"	Babyface, L.A. Reid and Daryl Simmons	Johnny Gill
1992
1992	"Power of Love/Love Power"	Marcus Miller, Luther Vandross and Teddy Vann	Luther Vandross
1992	"Can You Stop the Rain"	Walter Afanasieff and John Bettis	Peabo Bryson
1992	"How Can I Ease the Pain"	Lisa Fischer and Narada Michael Walden	Lisa Fischer
1992	"I Wanna Sex You Up"	Dr. Freeze	Color Me Badd
1992	"I'll Take You There"	Alvertis Isbell	BeBe & CeCe Winans featuring Mavis Staples
1993
1993	"End of the Road"	Babyface, L.A. Reid and Daryl Simmons	Boyz II Men
1993	"Ain't 2 Proud 2 Beg"	Dallas Austin and Lisa "Left Eye" Lopes	TLC
1993	"I'll Be There"	Hal Davis, Berry Gordy, Willie Hutch and Bob West	Mariah Carey and Trey Lorenz
1993	"Jam"	Michael Jackson, René Moore, Teddy Riley and Bruce Swedien	Michael Jackson
1993	"My Lovin' (You're Never Gonna Get It)"	Denzil Foster and Thomas McElroy	En Vogue
1994
1994	"That's the Way Love Goes"	Janet Jackson, Jimmy Jam and Terry Lewis	Janet Jackson
1994	"Anniversary"	Raphael Saadiq and Carl Wheeler	Tony! Toni! Toné!
1994	"Can We Talk"	Babyface and Daryl Simmons	Tevin Campbell
1994	"Heaven Knows"	Luther Vandross and Reed Vertelney	Luther Vandross
1994	"Little Miracles (Happen Every Day)"	Marcus Miller and Luther Vandross	Luther Vandross
1995
1995	"I'll Make Love to You"	Babyface	Boyz II Men
1995	"Body and Soul"	Rick Nowels and Ellen Shipley	Anita Baker
1995	"If That's Your Boyfriend (He Wasn't Last Night)"	Me'Shell Ndegéocello	Me'Shell Ndegéocello
1995	"When Can I See You"	Babyface	Babyface
1995	"You Mean the World to Me"	Babyface, L.A. Reid and Daryl Simmons	Toni Braxton
1996
1996	"For Your Love"	Stevie Wonder	Stevie Wonder
1996	"Brown Sugar"	D'Angelo and Ali Shaheed Muhammad	D'Angelo
1996	"Creep"	Dallas Austin	TLC
1996	"Red Light Special"	Babyface	TLC
1996	"You Can't Run"	Babyface	Vanessa Williams
1997
1997	"Exhale (Shoop Shoop)"	Babyface	Whitney Houston
1997	"Sittin' Up in My Room"	Babyface	Brandy
1997	"You Put a Move on My Heart"	Rod Temperton	Tamia
1997	"You're Makin' Me High"	Babyface, Toni Braxton and Bryce Wilson	Toni Braxton
1997	"Your Secret Love"	Luther Vandross and Reed Vertelney	Luther Vandross
1998
1998	"I Believe I Can Fly"	R. Kelly	R. Kelly
1998	"Honey"	Mariah Carey, Sean Combs, Kamaal Fareed, Stephen Hague, Steven Jordan, Ronald Larkins, Malcolm McLaren, Larry Price and Bobby Robinson	Mariah Carey
1998	"No Diggity"	Dr. Dre, Chauncey Hannibal, Teddy Riley, William Stewart and Lynise Walters	Blackstreet featuring Dr. Dre and Queen Pen
1998	"On & On"	Erykah Badu and JahBorn Jahmal Cantero	Erykah Badu
1998	"Stomp"	George Clinton Jr., Kirk Franklin, Walter Morrison and Garry M. Shider	God's Property featuring Kirk Franklin and Cheryl James
1999
1999	"Doo Wop (That Thing)"	Lauryn Hill	Lauryn Hill
1999	"All My Life"	Rory Bennett and JoJo Hailey	K-Ci & JoJo
1999	"The Boy Is Mine"	Brandy, LaShawn Daniels, Fred Jerkins III, Rodney Jerkins and Japhe Tejeda	Brandy and Monica
1999	"Lean on Me"	Kirk Franklin	Kirk Franklin with Mary J. Blige, R. Kelly, Bono, Crystal Lewis and The Family
1999	"A Rose Is Still a Rose"	Lauryn Hill	Aretha Franklin

=== 2000s ===
Year^{[I]}	Song	Songwriter(s)	Artist(s)
2000
2000	"No Scrubs"	Kevin Briggs, Kandi Burruss and Tameka Cottle	TLC
2000	"All That I Can Say"	Lauryn Hill	Mary J. Blige
2000	"Bills, Bills, Bills"	Kevin Briggs, Kandi Burruss, Beyoncé Knowles, LeToya Luckett and Kelly Rowland	Destiny's Child
2000	"Heartbreak Hotel"	Kenneth Karlin, Tamara Savage and Carsten Schack	Whitney Houston featuring Faith Evans and Kelly Price
2000	"It's Not Right but It's Okay"	LaShawn Daniels, Toni Estes, Fred Jerkins III, Rodney Jerkins and Isaac Phillips	Whitney Houston
2001
2001	"Say My Name"	LaShawn Daniels, Fred Jerkins III, Rodney Jerkins, Beyoncé Knowles, LeToya Luckett, LaTavia Roberson and Kelly Rowland	Destiny's Child
2001	"Bag Lady"	Erykah Badu	Erykah Badu
2001	"He Wasn't Man Enough"	LaShawn Daniels, Fred Jerkins III, Rodney Jerkins and Harvey Mason Jr.	Toni Braxton
2001	"Thong Song"	Desmond Child, Tim Kelley, Bob Robinson, Robi Rosa and Sisqó	Sisqó
2001	"Untitled (How Does It Feel)"	D'Angelo and Raphael Saadiq	D'Angelo
2002
2002	"Fallin'"	Alicia Keys	Alicia Keys
2002	"Didn't Cha Know?"	Erykah Badu, Phil Clendeninn and James Yancy	Erykah Badu
2002	"Get Ur Freak On"	Missy Elliott and Timothy Mosley	Missy Elliott
2002	"Hit 'Em Up Style (Oops!)"	Dallas Austin	Blu Cantrell
2002	"Love of My Life"	Brian McKnight	Brian McKnight
2002	"Video"	Carlos "Six July" Broady, Reginald Harris, India.Arie and Shannon Sanders	India.Arie
2003
2003	"Love of My Life (An Ode to Hip-Hop)"	Erykah Badu, Madukwu Chinwah, Rashid Lonnie Lynn, Robert Ozuna, James Poyser, Raphael Saadiq and Glenn Standridge	Erykah Badu featuring Common
2003	"Be Here"	Michael Archer, Robert Ozuna, Raphael Saadiq and Glenn Standridge	Raphael Saadiq featuring D'Angelo
2003	"Floetic"	Marsha Ambrosius, Darren "Limitless" Henson, Keith Pelzer and Natalie Stewart	Floetry
2003	"Good Man"	Will Baker, India.Arie, Andrew Ramsey, Shannon Sanders and Pete Woodruff	India.Arie
2003	"Take a Message"	Remy Shand	Remy Shand
2004
2004	"Crazy in Love"	Rich Harrison, Shawn Carter and Beyoncé Knowles	Beyoncé featuring Jay-Z
2004	"Comin' from Where I'm From"	Mark Batson and Anthony Hamilton	Anthony Hamilton
2004	"Dance with My Father"	Richard Marx and Luther Vandross	Luther Vandross
2004	"Danger"	Erykah Badu, James Poyser, B.R. Smith and R.C. Williams	Erykah Badu
2004	"Rock wit U (Awww Baby)"	Ashanti Douglas, Irv Gotti and Andre Parker	Ashanti
2005
2005	"You Don't Know My Name"	Alicia Keys, Harold Lilly and Kanye West	Alicia Keys
2005	"Burn"	Bryan Michael Cox, Jermaine Dupri and Usher	Usher
2005	"Call My Name"	Prince	Prince
2005	"My Boo"	Jermaine Dupri, Alicia Keys, Manuel Seal, Adonis Shropshire and Usher	Usher and Alicia Keys
2005	"Yeah!"	Sean Garrett, LaMarquis Jefferson, Lil Jon, Ludacris, Robert McDowell, James Phillips and Patrick J. Que Smith	Usher featuring Lil Jon and Ludacris
2006
2006	"We Belong Together"	Johntá Austin, Mariah Carey, Jermaine Dupri and Manuel Seal Jr.	Mariah Carey
2006	"Cater 2 U"	Rodney Jerkins, Beyoncé Knowles, Ricky Lewis, Kelly Rowland, Robert Waller and Michelle Williams	Destiny's Child
2006	"Free Yourself"	Craig Brockman, Missy Elliott and Nisan Stewart	Fantasia
2006	"Ordinary People"	Will Adams and John Legend	John Legend
2006	"Unbreakable"	Alicia Keys, Harold Lilly and Kanye West	Alicia Keys
2007
2007	"Be Without You"	Johntá Austin, Mary J. Blige, Bryan-Michael Cox and Jason Perry	Mary J. Blige
2007	"Black Sweat"	Prince	Prince
2007	"Déjà Vu"	Shawn Carter, Rodney Jerkins, Beyoncé Knowles, Keli Nicole Price, Makeba Riddick, Delisha Thomas and John Webb	Beyoncé featuring Jay-Z
2007	"Don't Forget About Us"	Johnta Austin, Mariah Carey, Bryan-Michael Cox and Jermaine Dupri	Mariah Carey
2007	"I Am Not My Hair"	India.Arie, Andrew Ramsey and Shannon Sanders	India.Arie
2008
2008	"No One"	Kerry "Krucial" Brothers, Dirty Harry and Alicia Keys	Alicia Keys
2008	"Beautiful Flower"	India.Arie and Joyce Simpson	India.Arie
2008	"Hate That I Love You"	Mikkel Eriksen, Tor Hermansen and Shaffer Smith	Rihanna featuring Ne-Yo
2008	"Teachme"	Ivan Barias, Adam W. Blackstone, Randy Bowland, Carvin Haggins, Johnnie Smith II and Corey Williams	Musiq Soulchild
2008	"When I See U"	Louis Biancaniello, Waynne Nugent, Erika Nuri, Kevin Risto, Janet Sewel and Sam Watters	Fantasia
2009
2009	"Miss Independent"	Mikkel Eriksen, Tor Hermansen and Ne-Yo	Ne-Yo
2009	"Bust Your Windows"	Salaam Remi and Jazmine Sullivan	Jazmine Sullivan
2009	"Customer"	Ivan Barias, Raheem DeVaughn, Carvin Haggins, Kristal Oliver and Johnnie Smith	Raheem DeVaughn
2009	"Heaven Sent"	Keyshia Cole, Jason Farmer and Alex Francis	Keyshia Cole
2009	"Spotlight"	Mikkel Eriksen, Tor Hermansen and Ne-Yo	Jennifer Hudson

=== 2010s ===
Year^{[I]}	Song	Songwriter(s)	Artist(s)
2010
2010	"Single Ladies (Put a Ring on It)"	Kuk Harrell, Beyoncé Knowles, Terius Nash and Christopher Stewart	Beyoncé
2010	"Blame It"	James T. Brown, John Conte, Jamie Foxx, Christopher Henderson, Brandon Melancon, Faheem Najm, Terius Nash, Breyon Prescott, Christopher Stewart and Nathan Walker	Jamie Foxx featuring T-Pain
2010	"Lions, Tigers & Bears"	Salaam Remi and Jazmine Sullivan	Jazmine Sullivan
2010	"Pretty Wings"	Hod David and Musze	Maxwell
2010	"Under"	Durrell Babbs, Lonny Bereal, Marcus Cooper, Antonio Dixon, Jerry Franklin, Thai Jones, Robert Newt and Kristina Stephens	Pleasure P
2011
2011	"Shine"	John Legend	John Legend and The Roots
2011	"Bittersweet"	Charles Harmon and Claude Kelly	Fantasia
2011	"Finding My Way Back"	Ivan Barias, Curt Chambers, Carvin Haggins, Jaheim Hoagland and Miguel Jontel	Jaheim
2011	"Second Chance"	El DeBarge and Mischke	El DeBarge
2011	"Why Would You Stay"	Kem Owens	Kem
2012
2012	"Fool for You"	Melanie Fiona, CeeLo Green and Jack Splash	CeeLo Green featuring Melanie Fiona
2012	"Far Away"	Marsha Ambrosius, Larrance Dopson, Lamar Edwards, Sterling Simms and Justin Smith	Marsha Ambrosius
2012	"Not My Daddy"	Kelly Price	Kelly Price featuring Stokley
2012	"Pieces of Me"	Charles Harmon, Claude Kelly and Ledisi Young	Ledisi
2012	"You Are"	Dennis Bettis, Carl M. Days Jr., Wirlie Morris, Charlie Wilson and Mahin Wilson	Charlie Wilson
2013
2013	"Adorn"	Miguel Jontel Pimentel	Miguel
2013	"Beautiful Surprise"	Tamia Hill, Claude Kelly and Salaam Remi	Tamia
2013	"Heart Attack"	Richard Butler, Benjamin Levin and Tremaine Neverson	Trey Songz
2013	"Pray for Me"	Antonio Dixon, Kenny Edmonds, Anthony Hamilton and Patrick M. Smith	Anthony Hamilton
2013	"Refill"	Darhyl "DJ" Camper, Elle Varner and Andrew "Pop" Wansel	Elle Varner
2014
2014	"Pusher Love Girl"	James Fauntleroy, Jerome Harmon, Timothy Mosley and Justin Timberlake	Justin Timberlake
2014	"Best of Me"	Anthony Hamilton and Jairus Mozee	Anthony Hamilton
2014	"Love and War"	Tamar Braxton, Darhyl Camper Jr., LaShawn Daniels and Makeba Riddick	Tamar Braxton
2014	"Only One"	PJ Morton	PJ Morton featuring Stevie Wonder
2014	"Without Me"	Fantasia Barrino, Missy Elliott, Al Sherrod Lambert, Harmony Samuels and Kyle Stewart	Fantasia featuring Kelly Rowland and Missy Elliott
2015
2015	"Drunk in Love"	Shawn Carter, Rasool Diaz, Noel Fisher, Jerome Harmon, Beyoncé Knowles, Timothy Mosley, Andre Eric Proctor and Brian Soko	Beyoncé
2015	"Good Kisser"	Ronald "Flip" Colson, Warren "Oak" Felder, Usher Raymond IV, Jameel Roberts, Terry "Tru" Sneed and Andrew "Pop" Wansel	Usher
2015	"New Flame"	Eric Belinger, Chris Brown, James Chambers, Malissa Hunter, Justin Booth Johnson, Mark Pitts, Usher Raymond IV, William Roberts, Maurice "Verse" Simmonds and Keith Thomas	Chris Brown featuring Usher and Rick Ross
2015	"Options" (Wolfjames Version)	Dominic Gordon, Brandon Hesson and Jamaica "Kahn-Cept" Smith	Luke James featuring Rick Ross
2015	"The Worst"	Jhené Aiko Chilombo, Mac Robinson and Brian Warfield	Jhené Aiko
2016
2016	"Really Love"	D'Angelo, Gina Figueroa and Kendra Foster	D'Angelo & The Vanguard
2016	"Coffee"	Brook Davis and Miguel Pimentel	Miguel
2016	"Earned It (Fifty Shades of Grey)"	Ahmad Balshe, Stephan Moccio, Jason Quenneville and Abel Tesfaye	The Weeknd
2016	"Let It Burn"	Kenny B. Edmonds, Jazmine Sullivan and Dwyane M. Weir II	Jazmine Sullivan
2016	"Shame"	Warryn Campbell, Tyrese Gibson and DJ Rogers Jr.	Tyrese
2017
2017	"Lake by the Ocean"	Hod David and Musze	Maxwell
2017	"Come and See Me"	Jahron Brathwaite, Aubrey Graham and Noah Shebib	PartyNextDoor featuring Drake
2017	"Exchange"	Michael Hernandez and Bryson Tiller	Bryson Tiller
2017	"Kiss It Better"	Jeff Bhasker, Robyn Fenty, John-Nathan Glass and Teddy Sinclair	Rihanna
2017	"Luv"	Magnus August Høiberg, Benjamin Levin and Daystar Peterson	Tory Lanez
2018
2018	"That's What I Like"	Christopher Brody Brown, James Fauntleroy, Ray Charles McCullough II, Philip Lawrence, Bruno Mars, Jeremy Reeves, Ray Romulus and Jonathan Yip	Bruno Mars
2018	"First Began"	PJ Morton	PJ Morton
2018	"Location"	Alfredo Gonzalez, Olatunji Ige, Samuel David Jiminez, Christopher McClenney, Khalid Robinson and Joshua Scruggs	Khalid
2018	"Redbone"	Donald Glover and Ludwig Göransson	Childish Gambino
2018	"Supermodel"	Tyran Donaldson, Terrence Henderson, Greg Landfair Jr. and Solána Rowe	SZA
2019
2019	"Boo'd Up"	Roderick Pusharod Bullock, Larrance Dopson, Joelle James, Ella Mai and Dijon McFarlane	Ella Mai
2019	"Come Through and Chill"	Jermaine Cole, Miguel Pimentel and Salaam Remi	Miguel featuring J. Cole and Salaam Remi
2019	"Feels Like Summer"	Donald Glover and Ludwig Göransson	Childish Gambino
2019	"Focus"	Darhyl Camper Jr., H.E.R. and Justin Love	H.E.R.
2019	"Long as I Live"	Paul Boutin, Toni Braxton and Antonio Dixon	Toni Braxton

=== 2020s ===
Year^{[I]}	Song	Songwriter(s)	Artist(s)
2020
2020	"Say So"	PJ Morton	PJ Morton featuring JoJo
2020	"Could've Been"	Dernst Emile II, David "Swagg R’Celious" Harris, H.E.R. and Hue "Soundzfire" Strother	H.E.R. featuring Bryson Tiller
2020	"Look at Me Now"	Emily King and Jeremy Most	Emily King
2020	"No Guidance"	Chris Brown, Tyler James Bryant, Nija Charles, Aubrey Graham, Anderson Hernandez, Joshua Huizar, Michee Patrick Lebrun, Noah Shebib and Teddy Walton	Chris Brown featuring Drake
2020	"Roll Some Mo"	David Brown, Dernst Emile II and Peter Lee Johnson	Lucky Daye
2021
2021	"Better Than I Imagined"	Robert Glasper, Meshell Ndegeocello and Gabriella Wilson	Robert Glasper featuring H.E.R. and Meshell Ndegeocello
2021	"Black Parade"	Denisia Andrews, Beyoncé, Stephen Bray, Shawn Carter, Brittany Coney, Derek James Dixie, Akil King, Kim "Kaydence" Krysiuk and Rickie "Caso" Tice	Beyoncé
2021	"Collide"	Sam Barsh, Stacy Barthe, Sonyae Elise, Olu Fann, Akil King, Josh Lopez, Kaveh Rastegar and Benedetto Rotondi	Tiana Major9 and EarthGang
2021	"Do It"	Chloe Bailey, Halle Bailey, Anton Kuhl, Victoria Monét, Scott Storch and Vincent van den Ende	Chloe x Halle
2021	"Slow Down"	Nasri Atweh, Badriia Bourelly, Skip Marley, Ryan Williamson and Gabriella Wilson	Skip Marley and H.E.R.
2022
2022	"Leave the Door Open"	Brandon Anderson, Christopher Brody Brown, Dernst Emile II and Bruno Mars	Silk Sonic
2022	"Damage"	Anthony Clemons Jr., Jeff Gitelman, Gabriella Wilson, Carl McCormick and Tiara Thomas	H.E.R.
2022	"Good Days"	Jacob Collier, Carter Lang, Carlos Munoz, Solána Rowe and Christopher Ruelas	SZA
2022	"Heartbreak Anniversary"	Giveon Evans, Maneesh, Sevn Thomas and Varren Wade	Giveon
2022	"Pick Up Your Feelings"	Denisia "Blue June" Andrews, Audra Mae Butts, Kyle Coleman, Brittany "Chi" Coney, Michael Holmes and Jazmine Sullivan	Jazmine Sullivan
2023
2023	"Cuff It"	Beyoncé, Denisia "Blu June" Andrews, Brittany "Chi" Coney, Terius "The-Dream" Gesteelde-Diamant, Morten Ristorp, Nile Rodgers and Raphael Saadiq	Beyoncé
2023	"Good Morning Gorgeous"	Mary J. Blige, David Brown, Dernst Emile II, Gabriella Wilson and Tiara Thomas	Mary J. Blige
2023	"Hrs and Hrs"	Hamadi Zaabi, Dylan Graham, Priscilla Renea, Thaddis "Kuk" Harrell, Brandon John-Baptiste, Isaac Wriston and Justin Nathaniel Zim	Muni Long
2023	"Hurt Me So Good"	Akeel Henry, Michael Holmes, Luca Mauti, Jazmine Sullivan and Elliott Trent	Jazmine Sullivan
2023	"Please Don't Walk Away"	PJ Morton	PJ Morton
2024
2024	"Snooze"	Kenny B. Edmonds, Blair Ferguson, Khris Riddick-Tynes, Solána Rowe and Leon Thomas	SZA
2024	"Angel"	Halle Bailey, Theron Feemster and Coleridge Tillman	Halle Bailey
2024	"Back to Love"	Darryl Andrew Farris, Robert Glasper and Alex Isley	Robert Glasper featuring Sir and Alex Isley
2024	"ICU"	Darhyl Camper Jr., Courtney Jones, Raymond Komba and Roy Keisha Rockette	Coco Jones
2024	"On My Mama"	Dernst Emile II, Jeff Gitelman, Victoria Monét, Kyla Moscovich, Jamil Pierre and Charles Williams	Victoria Monét
2025
2025	"Saturn"	Rob Bisel, Carter Lang, Solána Rowe, Jared Solomon, Scott Zhang and Cian Ducrot	SZA
2025	"After Hours"	Diovanna Frazier, Alex Goldblatt, Kehlani Parrish, Khris Riddick-Tynes and Daniel Upchurch	Kehlani Parrish
2025	"Burning"	Ronald Banful and Temilade Openiyi	Tems
2025	"Here We Go (Uh Oh)"	Sara Diamond, Sydney Floyd, Marisela Jackson, Courtney Jones, Carl McCormick and Kelvin Wooten	Coco Jones
2025	"Ruined Me"	Jeff Gitelman, Priscilla Renea and Kevin Theodore	Muni Long
2026
2026	"Folded"	Darius Dixson, Andre Harris, Kehlani Parrish, Donovan Knight, Don Mills, Khris Riddick-Tynes and Dawit Kamal Wilson	Kehlani
2026	"Heart of a Woman"	David Bishop and Summer Walker	Summer Walker
2026	"It Depends"	Nico Baran, Chris Brown, Ant Clemons, Ephrem Lopez Jr., Ryan Press, Bryson Tiller, Elliott Trent and Dewain Whitmore Jr.	Chris Brown featuring Bryson Tiller
2026	"Overqualified"	James John Abrahart Jr, John Derisme, Egbert "Budda" Foster, Amaire Johnson, Frank Moka, Cary Singer, Chase Worrell and Durand Bernarr	Durand Bernarr
2026	"Yes It Is"	Jariuce Banks, Lazaro Andres Camejo, Mike Hector, Peter Lee Johnson, Rodney Jones Jr., Ali Prawl and Leon Thomas	Leon Thomas
2027	"Let Me"	Jahshua Brown, Darhyl Camper, Jr., Jeff Gitelman, Tiyon Mack, Victoria Monét and Branden Rowell	Victoria Monét
2027	"My Muse”	Lazaro Camejo, Rob Gueringer, Nile Eugene Hargrove, Peter Lee Johnson, Marcus Clayton Paul, David Kenneth Phelps and Leon Thomas	Leon Thomas
2027	"Out the Window"	Antonio Lamar Dixon, Ashton Norful, Kehlani Parrish, Khris Riddick-Tynes and Talay Riley	Kehlani
2027	"Pressha"	Adam Blackstone, Jill Scott and Vincent Tolan	Jill Scott
2027	"What You Need"	Temilade Openiyi	Tems

- ^{^[I]} Each year is linked to the article about the Grammy Awards held that year.
- ^{^[II]} The performing artist is only listed but does not receive the award.

== Multiple wins ==
5 wins

- Beyoncé

4 wins

- Babyface

3 wins

- Alicia Keys
- Bill Withers
- Stevie Wonder

2 wins

- Johnta Austin
- Anita Baker
- Brody Brown
- Bill Champlin
- James Fauntleroy
- Jay Graydon
- Jay-Z
- J-Roc
- Bruno Mars
- Raphael Saadiq
- SZA

== Multiple nominations ==
17 nominations

- Babyface

9 nominations

- Beyoncé
- Stevie Wonder

8 nominations

- Leon Huff

7 nominations

- Luther Vandross

6 nominations

- H.E.R.
- Rodney Jerkins
- L.A. Reid
- Daryl Simmons

5 nominations

- Erykah Badu
- Darhyl Camper
- Harry Wayne Casey
- D'Mile
- LaShawn Daniels
- Alicia Keys
- Prince
- Raphael Saadiq
- Jazmine Sullivan

4 nominations

- India Arie
- Richard Finch
- Jay-Z
- Fred Jerkins III
- Jeff Gitelman
- Miguel
- PJ Morton
- Salaam Remi
- Khris Riddick-Tynes
- Nile Rodgers
- SZA
- Usher

3 nominations

- Dallas Austin
- Johntá Austin
- Ivan Barias
- Chris Brown
- Darhyl Camper
- Mariah Carey
- D'Angelo
- Antonio Dixon
- Bernard Edwards
- Missy Elliott
- Carvin Haggins
- Anthony Hamilton
- Lauryn Hill
- Nova Wav
- Janet Jackson
- Michael Jackson
- Claude Kelly
- Marcus Miller
- Khris Riddick-Tynes
- Kelly Rowland
- Shannon Sanders
- Stargate
- Barrett Strong
- Rod Temperton
- Timbaland
- Norman Whitfield
- Bill Withers
- Leon Thomas
- Kehlani
- Victoria Monét

2 nominations

- Marsha Ambrosius
- Halle Bailey
- Anita Baker
- Benny Blanco
- Mary J. Blige
- Toni Braxton
- Kevin Briggs
- Brody Brown
- Kandi Burruss
- Cardiak
- Bill Champlin
- Ant Clemons
- Bryan-Michael Cox
- Hod David
- Donald Davis
- Hal Davis
- Larrance Dopson
- Drake
- James Fauntleroy
- 40
- David Foster
- Kenny Gamble
- Lee Garrett
- Jimmy George
- Cary Gilbert
- Robert Glasper
- Donald Glover
- Ludwig Göransson
- Jay Graydon
- Chuck Harmony
- Michael Holmes
- James Ingram
- Jimmy Jam
- General Johnson
- J-Roc
- Louis A. Johnson
- Peter Lee Johnson
- Coco Jones
- Quincy Jones
- R. Kelly
- Akil King
- William King
- Kirk Franklin
- John Legend
- Terry Lewis
- Carter Lang
- Harold Lilly
- LeToya Luckett
- Lucky Daye
- Bruno Mars
- Maxwell
- Gene McFadden
- Meshell Ndegeocello
- Ne-Yo
- Temilade Openiyi
- Walter Orange
- Robert Ozuna
- James Poyser
- Andrew Ramsey
- Makeba Riddick
- Khris Riddick-Tynes
- Lionel Richie
- Teddy Riley
- Manuel Seal
- Johnnie Smith
- Glenn Standridge
- Tricky Stewart
- The-Dream
- Tiara Thomas
- Bryson Tiller
- Elliott Trent
- Reed Vertelney
- Narada Michael Walden
- Pop Wansel
- Kanye West
- Maurice White

== See also ==
- List of Grammy Award categories
- List of R&B musicians
- Grammy Award for Best R&B Performance
