= The Way I Feel (Remy Shand album) =

Studio album by Remy Shand
- Released: March 12, 2002
- Recorded: 2001
- Genre: R&B; blue-eyed soul
- Length: 47:14
- Label: Universal Records (Canada); Motown (United States)
- Producer: Remy Shand

Singles from The Way I Feel
- 1. "Take a Message" Released: 2001; 2. "The Way I Feel" Released: 2001; 3. "Rocksteady" Released: November 19, 2002

Professional ratings
Review scores
Source	Rating
Allmusic	4.5/5 stars

The Way I Feel is the only studio album by Canadian R&B musician Remy Shand. The album was released in 2001 in Shand's native Canada, UK & Europe via Universal Records and on March 12, 2002 in the United States via Motown Records. Three singles were released from the album: "Take a Message", "The Way I Feel", and "Rocksteady". "Take a Message" was the only song from the album to chart on the Billboard Hot 100, peaking at #89. Shand wrote and produced all of the album's tracks.

The album peaked at #1 on the Canadian Albums Chart and at #39 on the Billboard 200. In 2003, the album was nominated for a Grammy for Best R&B Album. "Take a Message" was nominated for Grammys for both Best Male R&B Vocal Performance and Best R&B Song, while "Rocksteady" was nominated for a Grammy for Best Traditional R&B Vocal Performance.

A 20th anniversary deluxe edition of the album was released in 2022.

== Track listing ==
All tracks are written by Remy Shand.

No.	Title	Length
1.	"The Way I Feel"	5:01
2.	"Burning Bridges"	4:35
3.	"Everlasting"	4:21
4.	"The Second One"	4:10
5.	"The Colour of Day"	3:35
6.	"Take a Message"	4:03
7.	"I Met Your Mercy"	2:43
8.	"Rocksteady"	3:38
9.	"Liberate"	3:56
10.	"Looking Back on Vanity"	5:00
11.	"The Mind's Eye"	6:12
Total length:		47:14

== Charts ==
=== Weekly charts ===
Weekly chart performance for The Way I Feel by Remy Shand
Chart (2002)	Peak position
US Billboard 200	39
US Top R&B/Hip-Hop Albums (Billboard)	15

=== Year-end charts ===
Year-end chart performance for The Way I Feel by Remy Shand
Chart (2002)	Position
Canadian Albums (Nielsen SoundScan)	39
Canadian R&B Albums (Nielsen SoundScan)	7
US Top R&B/Hip-Hop Albums (Billboard)	88

== Certifications ==
Country	Certification	Sales
Canada	Platinum	100,000
USA		500,000
