= Black Byrd =

Studio album by Donald Byrd
- Released: 1973
- Recorded: April 3–4, 1972, November 24, 1972
- Studio: The Sound Factory, Hollywood
- Genre: Jazz-funk
- Length: 44:21
- Label: Blue Note; BN-LA047-F
- Producer: Larry Mizell

Donald Byrd chronology
Ethiopian Knights (1971)	Black Byrd (1973)	Street Lady (1973)

Professional ratings
Review scores
Source	Rating
AllMusic	5/5 stars
The Rolling Stone Jazz Record Guide	3/5 stars
The Penguin Guide to Jazz Recordings	3/4 stars

Black Byrd is a 1973 album by Donald Byrd and the first of his Blue Note albums to be produced by Larry Mizell, assisted by his brother, former Motown producer Fonce. In the jazz funk idiom, it is among Blue Note Records' best selling album releases. The title of the album inspired the name of Byrd's apprentice group, The Blackbyrds.

== Track listing ==
No.	Title	Writer(s)	Length
1.	"Flight Time"	Larry Mizell	8:27
2.	"Black Byrd"	Larry Mizell	8:00
3.	"Love's So Far Away"	Larry Mizell	6:00
4.	"Mr. Thomas"	Larry Mizell, Warren Jordan	5:15
5.	"Sky High"	Larry Mizell	5:59
6.	"Slop Jar Blues"	Larry Mizell	6:00
7.	"Where Are We Going?"	Larry Mizell, Larry Gordon	4:40

== Personnel ==
- Donald Byrd - trumpet, flugelhorn, electric trumpet, vocals
- Allan Curtis Barnes - flute, oboe, saxophone
- Roger Glenn - saxophone, flute
- Fonce Mizell - trumpet, vocals
- Larry Mizell - vocals
- Kevin Toney - piano
- Freddie Perren - piano, synthesizer, vocals
- Dean Parks, David T. Walker, Barney Perry - guitar
- Joe Sample - piano, electric piano
- Chuck Rainey, Wilton Felder, Joe Hill - bass
- Harvey Mason, Sr, Keith Killgo - drums
- Bobbye Hall Porter, Perk Jacobs, Stephanie Spruill - percussion
- King Errisson - congas and bongos
