= Remy Shand =

Canadian R&B/soul singer (born 1978)

- Born: October 14, 1977 (age 48); Winnipeg, Manitoba, Canada
- Genres: R&B, soul, neo soul, blue-eyed soul
- Occupations: Singer-songwriter, record producer, multi-instrumentalist
- Years active: 2001–2002; 2013–2016
- Labels: Remy Records, Motown, Universal Music
- Spouse: Maiko Watson (m. 2001; div. 2009)

Remy Shand (born October 14, 1977) is a Canadian R&B/soul singer. His lone studio album The Way I Feel (2002) reached number one on the Canadian Albums chart. The album and its single "Take a Message", earned him four Grammy Award nominations.

== Career ==
Shand became a fan of artists such as Stevie Wonder, The Isley Brothers, Marvin Gaye, Steely Dan and Earth, Wind & Fire. During 1998 he began to write and record songs independently. Three years later, he was signed to Motown Records, and these songs became the basis for his first and only album, The Way I Feel which was released on March 12, 2002. The album won a Juno Award for Best R&B/Soul Recording in the 2003 Juno Awards. In 2002, Shand also released the hit singles "Rocksteady" and "Take A Message".

Shand now leads a quiet life out of the public eye and has transitioned into electrical engineering, stating: "Motown was one of the few studios that built their own gear. I think that inspired me to become more than just an entertainer. Modern music has always been dictated by technological advancements intertwined with cultural movements. Song and dance have been around for ages and I would like to encourage more artists to evolve beyond that cycle, separate themselves from the pageantry, and get heavy with the recording arts and sciences. It’s time to step into the future and innovate."

== Accolades ==
Shand also received four Grammy nominations for his work.

== Discography ==
=== Studio albums ===
Title	Details	Peak chart positions			Certifications (sales thresholds)
Title	Details	CAN	U.S.	U.S. R&B	Certifications (sales thresholds)
The Way I Feel	Release date: March 12, 2002 (US); Label: Motown Records; Formats: CD	1	39	15	CAN: Platinum

=== EPs ===
Title	Details
Archives, Vol. 1	Release date: September 3, 2016; Label: Remy Records; Formats: Digital Download
Archives, Vol. 2: The California Instrumentals	Release date: December 8, 2016; Label: Remy Records; Formats: Digital Download

=== Singles ===
- "Take a Message" (2001), Universal
- "The Way I Feel" (2001), Universal
- "Rocksteady" (2001), Universal
- "Lust" (2013), Remy Records
- "Song for Mark Gonzales" (2013), Remy Records
- "Where Are We Going" (2013), Remy Records
- "Springtime (Live)" (2013), Remy Records
- "Worms (Instrumental)" (2013), Remy Records
- "Mainline" (2013), Remy Records
- "The Best In Me" (2014), Remy Records
- "Son Of Night" (2014), Remy Records
- "Politicians" (2014), Remy Records
- "The Price I Pay" (2015), Remy Records
- "Electronic Flesh" (2015), Remy Records
- "Lament of Nine" (2015), Remy Records
- "Man of Time" (2015), Remy Records
- "Washington Square" (2015), Remy Records
- "Serafin" (2015), Remy Records
- "Peer Pressure" (2015), Remy Records
- "Event Horizon" (2015), Remy Records
- "My Hollywood" (2016), Remy Records

== Awards and nominations ==
Juno Awards

Year	Nominated work	Award	Result
2003	The Way I Feel	R&B/Soul Recording of the Year	Won

Grammy Awards

Year	Nominated work	Award	Result
2003	The Way I Feel	Best R&B Album	Nominated
2003	"Take a Message"	Best R&B Vocal Performance - Male	Nominated
2003	"Take a Message"	Best R&B Song	Nominated
2003	"Rocksteady"	Best Traditional R&B Vocal Performance	Nominated
