= Funk, Inc. =

Jazz funk group

- Origin: Indianapolis, Indiana, United States
- Genres: Funk, soul, jazz funk, soul jazz
- Years active: 1969–1976, 1995
- Labels: Prestige Records, Milestone Records
- Past members: Bobby Watley; Eugene Barr; Steve Weakley; Jimmy Munford; Cecil Hunt

Funk, Inc. was an American jazz funk/soul jazz group, founded in Indianapolis, Indiana, United States, in 1969 by Bobby Watley, Eugene Barr, Steve Weakley, Jimmy Munford and Cecil Hunt. During the 1970s they were signed to the Prestige Records label for whom they recorded five albums, though they later disbanded in 1976.

Former member Cecil Hunt, who was born on July 27, 1940, died on April 12, 2015, in his birthplace of Indianapolis, Indiana.

== Discography ==
=== Studio albums ===
Year	Album	Peak chart positions	
Year	Album	US Jazz	US R&B
1971	Funk, Inc.	—	45
1972	Chicken Lickin'	27	—
1973	Hangin' Out	9	—
1973	Superfunk	14	31
1974	Priced to Sell	—	30
1995	Urban Renewal	—	—
"—" denotes releases that did not chart.

=== Compilation albums ===
- 1988: Acid Inc: The Best of Funk Inc.
