= Superfunk (album) =

Studio album by Funk, Inc.
- Released: 1973
- Recorded: July 1973 at Fantasy Studios, Berkeley, California
- Genre: Funk
- Length: 36:34
- Label: Prestige Records
- Producer: David Axelrod

Funk, Inc. chronology
Hangin' Out (1973)	Superfunk (1973)	Priced to Sell (1974)

Superfunk is the fourth studio album by Funk, Inc., released in 1973.

== Track listing ==
No.	Title	Length
1.	"Message from the Meters"	6:09
2.	"Goodbye, So Long"	4:26
3.	"The Hill Where the Lord Hides"	8:00
4.	"Honey, I Love You"	3:23
5.	"Just Don't Mean a Thing"	5:02
6.	"I'm Going to Love You"	9:34

== Personnel ==
Funk, Inc.

- Gene Barr — tenor saxophone; voice on "I'm Going to Love You"
- Steve Weakley — guitar
- Bobby Watley — organ; vocals on "Goodbye, So Long"
- Jimmy Munford — drums; vocals on "Message From the Meters", "Honey, I Love You" and "Just Don't Mean a Thing"
- Cecil Hunt — congas

Additional personnel

- Jackie Kelso — tenor saxophone, baritone saxophone
- Allen DeRienzo — trumpet
- Ollie Mitchell — trumpet
- George Bohanon — trombone
- Don Peak — guitar
- Johnny "Guitar" Watson — bass

== Charts ==
Chart (1974)	Peak position
Billboard Top Soul Albums	31
Billboard Top Jazz Albums	14
