= Hangin' Out (Funk, Inc. album) =

Studio album by Funk, Inc.
- Released: 1973
- Recorded: December 1, 1972
- Studio: Van Gelder Studio, Englewood Cliffs, New Jersey
- Genre: Funk
- Length: 33:20
- Label: Prestige Records
- Producer: Ozzie Cadena

Funk, Inc. chronology
Chicken Lickin' (1972)	Hangin' Out (1973)	Superfunk (1973)

Hangin' Out is the third studio album by Funk, Inc., released in 1973.

== Track listing ==
No.	Title	Length
1.	"Smokin' at Tiffany's"	5:30
2.	"Give Me Your Love"	5:35
3.	"We Can Be Friends"	5:15
4.	"Dirty Red"	6:05
5.	"I Can See Clearly Now"	6:00
6.	"I'll Be Around"	4:55

== Personnel ==
- Gene Barr — tenor saxophone
- Steve Weakley — guitar
- Bobby Watley — organ; vocals on "We Can Be Friends"
- Jimmy Munford — drums; vocals on "We Can Be Friends"
- Cecil Hunt — congas
- Gordon Edwards — bass on "Smoking at Tiffany's", "Dirty Red" and "I'll Be Around"

== Charts ==
Chart (1973)	Peak position
Billboard Top Jazz Albums	9
