= Priced to Sell =

Studio album by Funk, Inc.
- Released: 1974
- Recorded: July to September 1974 at Fantasy Studios, Berkeley, California
- Genre: Funk
- Length: 29:10
- Label: Prestige Records
- Producer: David Axelrod

Funk, Inc. chronology
Superfunk (1973)	Priced to Sell (1974)	Urban Renewal (1995)

Professional ratings
Review scores
Source	Rating
Allmusic	2.5/5 stars

Priced to Sell is the fifth studio album by Funk, Inc., released in 1974.

== Track listing ==
No.	Title	Length
1.	"It Ain't the Spotlight"	4:47
2.	"Priced to Sell"	5:21
3.	"God Only Knows"	4:10
4.	"Where Are We Going"	4:20
5.	"Gimme Some Lovin'"	3:06
6.	"Somewhere in My Mind"	3:11
7.	"The Girl of My Dreams"	4:15

== Personnel ==
- Gene Barr – Tenor saxophone
- Michael Hughes – Drums
- Cecil Hunt – Conga
- Jackie Kelso, Jay Migliori, Bill Green – Reeds
- Ruby Turner, Billy Fender – Guitar
- Bobby Watley, Terry Fairfax – Keyboards
- Snooky Young, Allen DeRienzo – Trumpet
- Edna Wright, Gregory Matta, Augie Johnson, Billie Barnum, Jim Gilstrap - Background vocals

== Charts ==
Chart (1975)	Peak position
Billboard Top Soul Albums	30
