= Urban Renewal (Funk, Inc. album) =

Studio album by Funk, Inc.
- Released: 1995
- Recorded: October 23–24 and November 9, 1995
- Studio: Van Gelder Studio, Englewood Cliffs, NJ
- Genre: Funk
- Length: 57:04
- Label: Prestige
- Producer: Bob Porter

Funk, Inc. chronology
Priced to Sell (1974)	Urban Renewal (1995)

Urban Renewal is an album by the American band Funk, Inc., released in 1995. Two of Funk Inc.'s original bandmembers played on the album.

== Critical reception ==
Professional ratings
Review scores
Source	Rating
AllMusic	4/5 stars

The Omaha World-Herald thought that the band "finds a strong groove but not much more on this James Brown-tinged jazz."

AllMusic wrote that the album "effectively combines the immediacy of soul and funk with the spontaneity of jazz."

== Track listing ==
No.	Title	Length
1.	"Ants in Yo Pants"	4:12
2.	"Urban Renewal"	4:53
3.	"Spasms"	6:16
4.	"Sneaky"	4:36
5.	"The Thang"	6:57
6.	"Days and Nights in St. Ignace"	5:14
7.	"Still Called the Blues"	3:58
8.	"Get Some More"	5:58
9.	"6th Street Stroll"	5:44
10.	"Memphis Underground"	8:16
