= Flying Start (album) =

Studio album by the Blackbyrds
- Released: November 1974
- Recorded: August to October 1974
- Studio: Sound Factory (Hollywood)
- Genres: Jazz funk, jazz fusion
- Length: 38:30
- Label: Fantasy
- Producer: Donald Byrd

The Blackbyrds chronology
The Blackbyrds (1974)	Flying Start (1974)	City Life (1975)

Professional ratings
Review scores
Source	Rating
AllMusic	4/5 stars
DownBeat	1/5 stars
Buffalo Evening News	favorable
The Guardian	mixed
Sunday Gazette-Mail	B
Omaha World-Herald	favorable
North County Times	favorable
The Ann Arbor News	favorable
Huddersfield Daily Examiner	favorable
Dorset Echo	favorable
Evening Post (Bristol)	favorable
Evening Post (Nottingham)	favorable
Grimsby Evening Telegraph	favorable
The Commercial Appeal	favorable

Flying Start is the second album by the American band the Blackbyrds. Produced by Donald Byrd, the album includes the top ten hit single "Walking in Rhythm".

== Track listing ==
Credits taken from original LP liner notes.

Side one
No.	Title	Writer(s)	Length
1.	"I Need You"	Donald Byrd, Cheryl Toney	5:30
2.	"The Baby"	Byrd	5:17
3.	"Love Is Love"	Keith Killgo	4:46
4.	"Blackbyrds' Theme"	Joe Hall, Allan Barnes, Kevin Toney	4:03

Side two
No.	Title	Writer(s)	Length
1.	"Walking in Rhythm"	Barney Perry	4:13
2.	"Furture Children, Future Hopes"	K. Toney	4:41
3.	"April Showers"	Barnes	3:49
4.	"Spaced Out"	K. Toney	6:11

== Personnel ==
The Blackbyrds

- Allan Barnes – flute, tenor saxophone, soprano saxophone, vocals on tracks 4 and 5
- Kevin Toney – acoustic and electric piano, clavinet, ARP synthesizer, vocals on tracks 4 and 5
- Barney Perry – guitar, vocals on tracks 4 and 5
- Joe Hall – bass, vocals on tracks 4 and 5
- Keith Killgo – drums, lead vocals on track 1, vocals on tracks 4 and 5
- Perk Jacobs – percussion, vocals on tracks 4 and 5

Additional Personnel

- Bobby Bryant – trumpet
- Oscar Brashear – trumpet
- Alexander Thomas – trombone
- George Bohanon – trombone
- Jackie Kelso – baritone saxophone
- Ernie Watts – tenor saxophone on track 1
- Sigidi – vocals on tracks 4 and 5
- Bruce Fisher – vocals on track 4
- Keith Barbour – lead vocals on track 7

== Charts ==
=== Album ===
Chart (1975)	Peak position
US Top LPs & Tape	30
US Top R&B Albums (Billboard)	5
US Top Jazz Albums (Billboard)	2

=== Single ===
Year	Single	Chart	Position
1975	"Walking in Rhythm"	US Billboard Hot 100	6
1975	"Walking in Rhythm"	US Hot Soul Singles	4
1975	"Walking in Rhythm"	US Easy Listening	5
