= Better Days (The Blackbyrds album) =

Studio album by the Blackbyrds
- Released: 1980
- Genres: Disco, soul
- Label: Fantasy
- Producer: George Duke

The Blackbyrds chronology
Night Grooves (1978)	Better Days (1980)	Greatest Hits (1989)

Better Days is the final studio album by the American band the Blackbyrds, released in 1980. "What We Have Is Right" was the first single. The band supported the album with a North American tour. It peaked at No. 133 on the Billboard 200 and No. 40 on the Soul LP's chart. It was reissued in 1994, along with Action.

== Production ==
The album was produced by George Duke. The band appreciated his ideas and his desire to defer to their musical identity. Cofounder Donald Byrd left the band prior to the recording sessions, due to legal disagreements; the band added the percussionist Dan Stewart and the singer James Garrett. Orville Saunders, one of the band's guitarists, considered their sound to be dance music, with disco, funk, and soul to be simply synonymous industry labels.

== Critical reception ==
Professional ratings
Review scores
Source	Rating
All Music Guide to Soul	2/5 stars
The Encyclopedia of Popular Music	2/5 stars
Funk	4/10
Oakland Tribune	2/4 stars
The New Rolling Stone Record Guide	2/5 stars

The Journal dismissed the album as "generally routine disco fodder". The Blade-Tribune called the band a "super soul group" that "creates an impeccable variety of mainstream black dance music, performed with rare excellence." The Tucson Citizen opined that Better Days "has much more punch and depth than previous albums".

The Evening Post called the "disco funk" "convincing but utterly predictable". The Buffalo News considered the title track and "Lonelies for Your Love" to be the album's best tracks. The Oakland Tribune concluded that the Blackbyrds' "better days are behind it."

== Track listing ==
Side 1

1. "Dancin' Dancin'"
2. "Lonelies for Your Love"
3. "Better Days"
4. "Do It Girl"
5. "Without Your Love"

Side 2

1. "Do You Wanna Dance"
2. "Love Don't Strike Twice"
3. "What's on Your Mind"
4. "Don't Know What to Say"
5. "What We Have Is Right"
