= The Blackbyrds (album) =

Studio album by the Blackbyrds
- Released: 1974
- Recorded: October 1973 to March 1974
- Studio: Fantasy Studios (Berkeley, California)
- Genres: Jazz funk, jazz fusion
- Label: Fantasy
- Producers: Larry Mizell, Donald Byrd

The Blackbyrds chronology
The Blackbyrds (1974)	Flying Start (1974)

The Blackbyrds is the debut album by the American rhythm and blues and jazz-funk fusion group the Blackbyrds. It was produced by Larry Mizell and Donald Byrd with production supervision by Orrin Keepnews.

The album artwork is a section of the Vincent Van Gogh painting Wheatfield with Crows.

== Critical reception ==
Professional ratings
Review scores
Source	Rating
AllMusic	4.5/5 stars
The Rolling Stone Record Guide	4/5 stars

Robert Gabriel of AllMusic declared, "This amazing album is the product of six full-time Howard University students taking the direction of department head and jazz great Donald Byrd into the Fantasy Studios along with the aid of production wizard Larry Mizell. The result is some of the finest groove-oriented jazz music ever recorded."

== Track listing ==
1. "Do It, Fluid" (Donald Byrd) 5:27
2. "Gut Level" (Lincoln Ross) 4:08
3. "Reggins" (Larry Mizell) 4:05
4. "The Runaway" (Donald Byrd, Kevin Toney) 4:13
5. "Funky Junkie" (Donald Byrd) 7:01
6. "Summer Love" (Allan Barnes) 5:08
7. "Life Styles" (Larry Mizell) 3:13
8. "A Hot Day Today" (Donald Byrd, Barney Perry) 3:16

== Personnel ==
- Donald Byrd - Trumpet, Flugelhorn, Vocals
- The Blackbyrds - Vocals
- Kevin Toney - Keyboards, Melodica, Synthesizer
- Joe Hall - Electric Bass
- Keith Killgo - Drums
- Allan Barnes - Soprano & Tenor Saxophone
- David Williams - Bass
- Oscar Brashear - Trumpet, Flugelhorn
- Perk Jacobs - Percussion
- Ray Armando - Percussion

== Charts ==
=== Album ===
Chart (1974)	Peak position
US Billboard Top LPs	96
US Billboard Top Soul LPs	14
US Billboard Top Jazz LPs	6

=== Singles ===
Year	Single	Chart	Position
1974	"Do It, Fluid"	US Billboard Hot 100	69
1974	"Do It, Fluid"	US Hot Soul Singles	23
1974	"Gut Level"	US Disco Action	9
