= Daily Times-Advocate =

Newspaper in Escondido, California

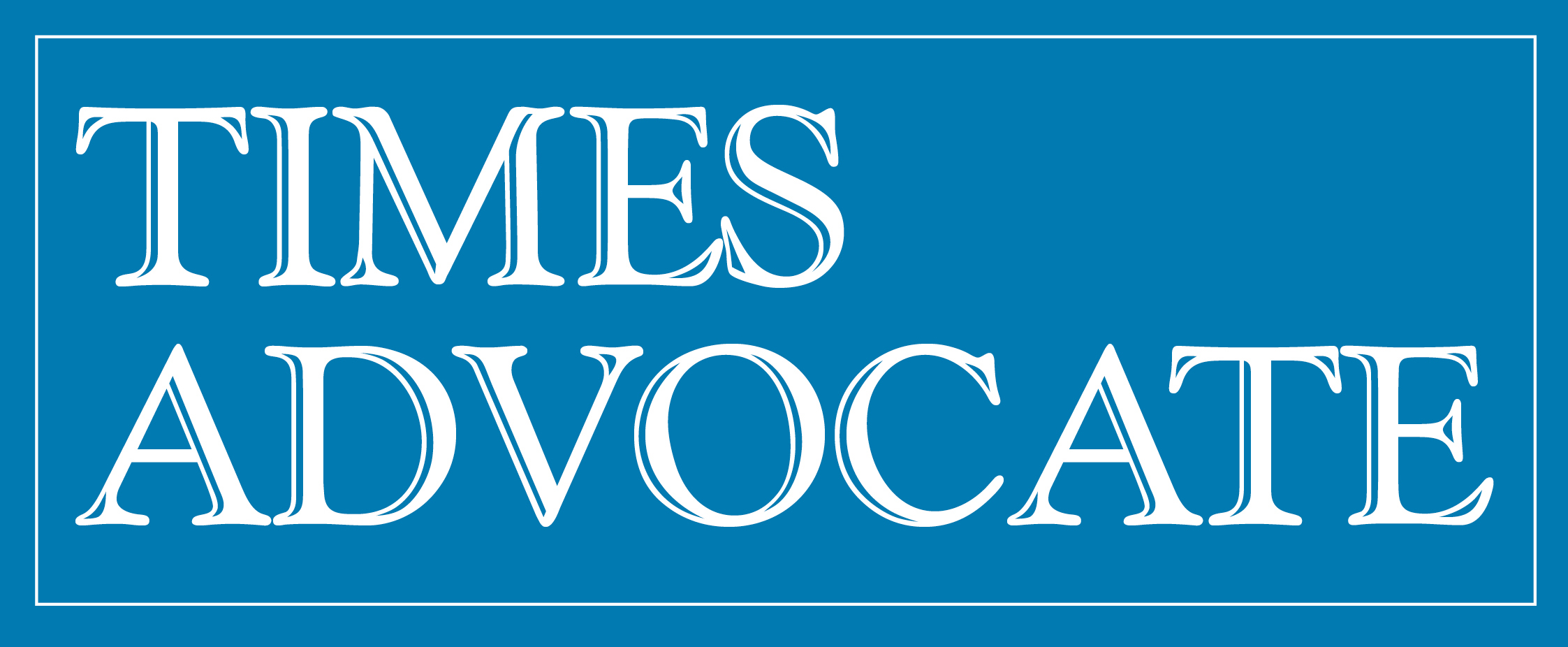

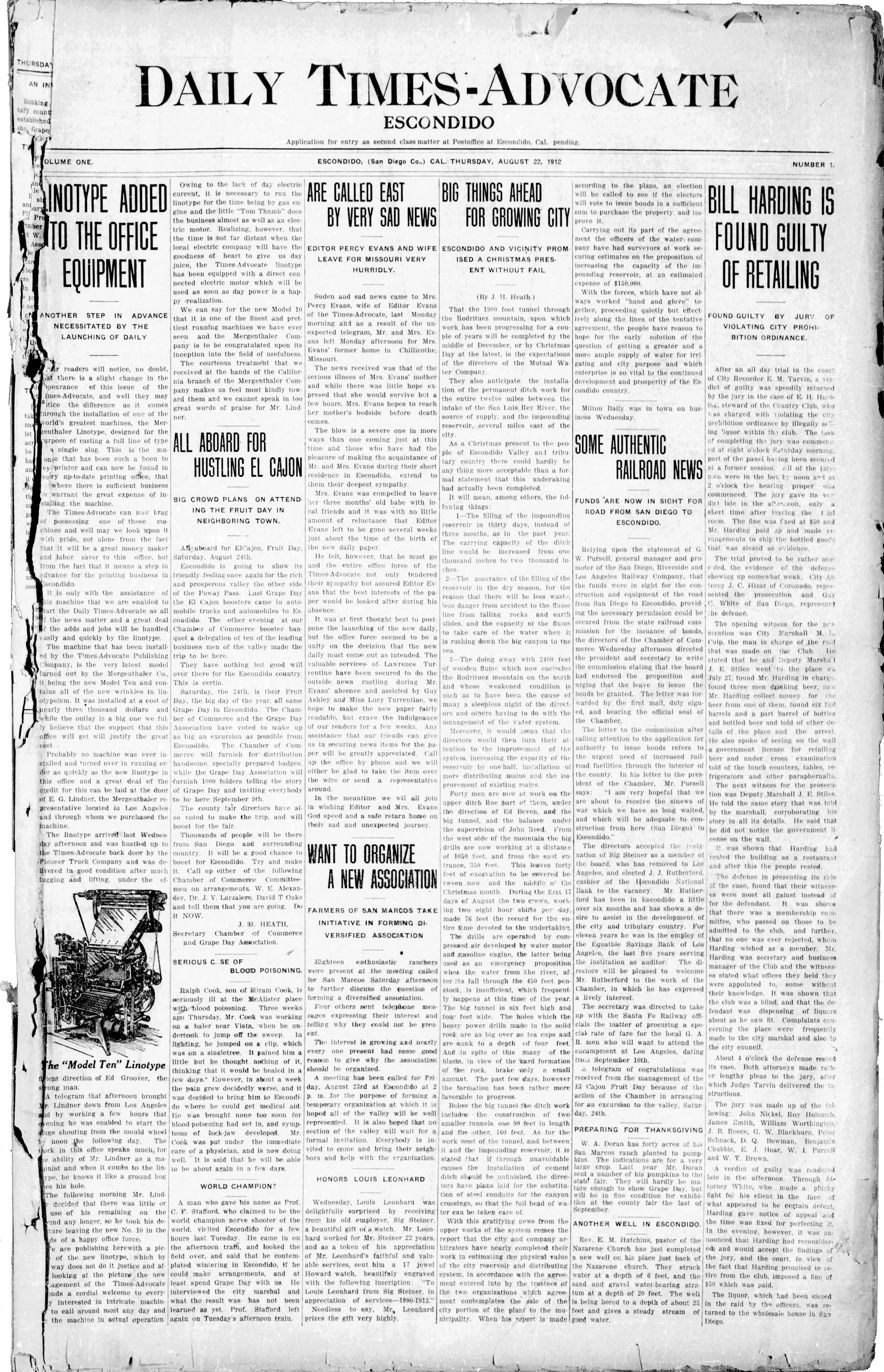
- Front page of the Aug. 22, 1912 edition.
- Type: Daily newspaper
- Format: Broadsheet
- Owner: The San Diego Union-Tribune
- Founder: Major Amasa S. Lindsa
- Founded: 1886 (as The Escondido Times)
- Ceased publication: 2013 (as North County Times)
- Language: English
- Headquarters: Escondido, California
- Sister newspapers: The Temecula Californian; Fallbrook Enterprise
- OCLC number: 33503793

The Daily Times-Advocate, also called the Escondido Times-Advocate, was a daily newspaper published in Escondido, California. It formed after The Escondido Times (1886) and The Escondido Advocate (1891) merged in 1909. After the paper was acquired by Howard Publications in 1995, the Times-Advocate merged with the Oceanside Blade-Citizen to form the North County Times. U-T San Diego acquired the Times in 2012 and fully absorbed it after a year.

== History ==
=== Origins (1886-1909) ===
On November 4, 1886, Major Amasa S. Lindsay and R.R. Beavers founded The Escondido Times. At some point Beavers left. In 1887, Captain James Trownsell became a co-owner. In 1889, Lindsay retired from active management of the Times. In 1891, Alvin D. Dunn founded The Escondido Advocate. It was affiliated with the Farmers' Alliance.

In 1892, Lindsay fully cut ties from the Times and sold out to Trownsell. A month later Charles K. Holmburg assumed control of the paper. In 1902, Holmburg leased the Times to Payton W. Estes after moving to Chicago. He planned to resume control of the paper after two years. Instead, in 1905, Holmburg sold the Times to Lindsay and Lynn W. Miller. A year later Lindsay assumed full control.

In 1908, Lindsay died. His widow Josephine then assumed control, until the Times was sold at public auction to G.C. Wharton for $1,795.

=== Post-merger (1909-1995) ===
On January 1, 1909, the two papers merged to form the Weekly Times-Advocate. This happened after Dunn sold the Advocate to a syndicate.

In 1911, the paper installed an automated typesetting Linotype machine. In 1912, J.N. Turrentine sold the Weekly Times-Advocate to Ernest W. White and Percy Evans. The two then expanded the paper from a weekly into a daily called the Daily Times-Advocate. In 1914, White sold out and acquired an interest in the Madera Mercury.

Evans continued to publish the paper for decades until 1946, when he sold the paper to Herbert R. McClintock and Frederick W. Speers. McClintock was the paper's advertising manager and Speers previously published the North Platt Daily Bulletin in Nebraska.

In 1965, The Daily Report Company, former publishers of The Daily Report, purchased the shares of Frederick W. Speers and Mrs. Hattie Smithers. The company bought out McClintock a few years earlier. Andrew B. Appleby then became publisher. A year later his brother Carlton R. Appleby was named publisher.

In 1977, the Appleby family sold the paper to Tribune Publishing, publishers of the Chicago Tribune. At time the Times-Advocate's circulation was 28,612. In 1988, Tribune purchased four nearby papers from Marmack Publishing Co., which was owned by Mrs. Marian F. Mack. The sale included The Californian in Temecula and Fallbrook Enterprise.

In 1990, the Times-Advocate was a Pulitzer Prize Finalist in Explanatory Journalism for its coverage of a shooting spree by an Escondido mail carrier and an examination of the challenges faced by Postal Service workers.

=== North County Times (1995-2013) ===
In 1995, Tribune Publishing sold its Southern California holdings, including its largest one, the Times-Advocate, to Howard Publications. At the time of the sale, the Times-Advocate had a circulation of 40,000. Following the sale, the Times-Advocate, The Californian, and the Fallbrook Enterprise were merged with North County Blade-Citizen of Oceanside to form the North County Times. The Times originally published nine local zoned editions, while another edition serving Southwest Riverside County retained The Californian masthead.

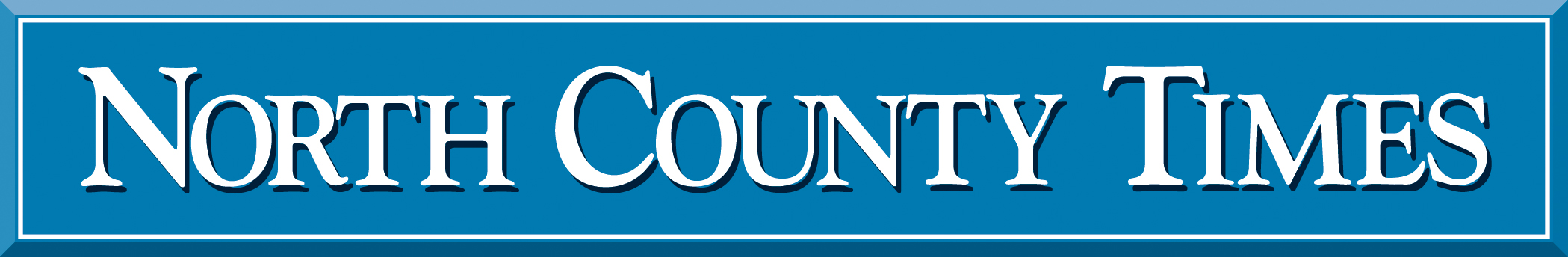
The nameplate of the North County Times, used from 1995 to 2009

In 2002, Howard was acquired by Lee Enterprises. In 2008, amid the Great Recession, 10% of staff were laid off, including 25 reporters and editors. In 2012, Doug Manchester, owner of U-T San Diego, bought the North County Times for $11.95 million. A third of staff was then laid off. Subsequently, the print edition of the Times and The California became local editions of U-T called U-T North County Times and U-T Californian.

In January 2013, the Times' website, including its digital archive, was taken offline. The URL was redirected to U-T. In March 2013, the separate U-T North County Times name was dropped and a U-T North County edition produced, which further integrated the U-T with North County-specific pages, while eliminating differences between the two. Previously, both the U-T North County Times and the regular U-T were sold side by side at newsstands.

In May 2013, U-T Californian was terminated, and it was also reported that the distinct content of the North County edition was being de-emphasized, marking an end to the Times. In September 2013, the Times' 4-acre warehouse and office facility in Escondido was sold for $7 million to the Classical Academy charter school.

=== Revival attempts ===
In May 2014, two locals launched a monthly bilingual tabloid called the Escondido Alliance, the town's first paper since the Times closed. In August 2014, real estate broker Kelly Crews started another monthly paper in Escondido called The Times-Advocate, which the name had fallen into public domain. In 2016, Crews sold The Times-Advocate to Justin Salter, owner of the revived Valley Roadrunner. Crews also sold his paper's Valley Center edition, which was absorbed into Salter's paper.

== Former staff and contributors ==
In 1979 photographer Len Lahman quit his job at the Los Angeles Times to begin a one-year personal project documenting the lives of California's migrant workers and the toll their living and working conditions had taken on them. His photo essay, pioneering for its time, was rejected by numerous publications, including National Geographic. He finally found a publisher in the Times-Advocate who ran it in 1980 as a 16-page supplement entitled Faces Beyond the Border. The following year, Lehman won the Robert F. Kennedy Journalism Award for the piece. A 1987–1988 series of stories by Catherine Spearnak for the Times-Advocate and San Diego Magazine on the unsolved murders of San Diego women involved in prostitution led to the establishment of San Diego's multi-agency Metropolitan Homicide Task Force.

Other staff or contributors who worked for the newspaper in their early careers include:

- James W. Huston (1953–2016), lawyer and author known for his military and legal thrillers who wrote op-eds for the Times-Advocate in the early 1990s
- Mary Jacobus (1957–2009), newspaper executive and former manager of the Boston Globe who was director of sales and marketing at the Times-Advocate in the 1980s
- Armen Keteyian (1953–), journalist and author who worked as a sports and feature writer for the paper from 1978 to 1980
- Jim Toomey (1960–), whose comic strip Sherman's Lagoon was first published in the Times-Advocate in 1991 and went on to national syndication
