= City Life (The Blackbyrds album) =

Studio album by the Blackbyrds
- Released: November 1975
- Recorded: 1975
- Studio: Sound Factory (Hollywood)
- Genre: Jazz-funk • Disco • Soul
- Label: Fantasy
- Producer: Donald Byrd

The Blackbyrds chronology
Flying Start (1974)	City Life (1975)	Unfinished Business (1976)

Professional ratings
Review scores
Source	Rating
AllMusic	4/5 stars

City Life is the third studio album by the American R&B/jazz-funk fusion group the Blackbyrds, released in 1975 on Fantasy Records. This album peaked at No. 1 on the US Billboard Top Jazz LPs, No. 3 on the Top R&B Albums and No. 16 on the Top Pop LPs charts. City Life has also been certified Gold in the US by the RIAA.

== Background ==
City Life was produced by Donald Byrd and includes singles "Happy Music" and "Rock Creek Park." "Happy Music" peaked at No. 19 on the US Billboard Hot 100 and No. 3 on the Hot R&B Songs charts. The tune also got to No. 11 on the US Billboard Dance Club Songs chart. "Rock Creek Park" peaked at No. 37 on the US Billboard Hot R&B Songs chart.

== Critical reception ==
Stewart Mason of AllMusic proclaimed, "The Blackbyrds -- a jazz-funk outfit formed in a university class taught by jazz trumpeter Donald Byrd, who produced the albums and wrote most of the tunes -- were more of an Earth, Wind & Fire-style horn band than a purist jazz crew, but few groups were better in their chosen style, and 1975's City Life is probably their best album...This is often-sublime stuff ripe for rediscovery by fans of '70s funk, soul, and fusion."

== Track listing ==
Song credits and timings taken from original LP.

Side One
No.	Title	Writer(s)	Length
1.	"Rock Creek Park"	Joe Hall, Keith Killgo, Kevin Toney, Orville Saunders, Stephen Johnson	4:35
2.	"Thankful 'Bout Yourself"	Saunders	5:11
3.	"City Life"	Toney	5:22
4.	"All I Ask"	Toney	3:50

Side Two
No.	Title	Writer(s)	Length
5.	"Happy Music"	Donald Byrd	4:32
6.	"Love So Fine"	Hall	5:00
7.	"Flying High"	Killgo	3:29
8.	"Hash and Eggs"	Fonce Mizell, Larry Mizell	5:06

== Personnel ==
The Blackbyrds

- Kevin Toney – keyboards
- Stephen Johnson – saxophone
- Orville Saunders – guitar
- Joe Hall – bass
- Keith Killgo – drums

Additional musicians

The original LP doesn't credit any musicians individually and instead gives a general "very special thanks" to them. Vocals for the album are also uncredited.

- Merry Clayton – vocals on "Rock Creek Park" and "Happy Music"
- George Bohanon
- Ernie Watts
- Patrice Rushen
- Gary Bartz
- Larry Mizell
- Fonce Mizell
- Tommy Morgan

== Charts ==
=== Album ===
Chart (1976)	Peak position
US Billboard Top LPs	16
US Billboard Top Soul LPs	3
US Billboard Top Jazz LPs	1

=== Singles ===
Year	Single	Chart	Position
1975	"City Life"	Disco Singles	4
1975	"Flying High"	Billboard Hot 100	70
1975	"Flying High"	Hot Soul Singles	22
1976	"Happy Music"	Billboard Hot 100	19
1976	"Happy Music"	Hot Soul Singles	3
1976	"Happy Music"	Disco Singles	6
1976	"Rock Creek Park"	Billboard Hot 100	93
1976	"Rock Creek Park"	Hot Soul Singles	37
