= Unfinished Business (The Blackbyrds album) =

Studio album by the Blackbyrds
- Released: November 1976
- Genres: R&B, jazz-funk
- Length: 36:30
- Label: Fantasy
- Producer: Donald Byrd

The Blackbyrds chronology
City Life (1975)	Unfinished Business (1976)	Action (1977)

Professional ratings
Review scores
Source	Rating
AllMusic	3/5 stars

Unfinished Business is the fourth studio album by the American R&B/jazz-funk fusion group the Blackbyrds, released in 1976 on Fantasy Records. The album peaked at No. 6 on the US Billboard Top R&B Albums chart and No. 34 on the Top Pop LPs chart. Unfinished Business has been certified Gold in the US by the RIAA.

== Background ==
The album was produced by musician Donald Byrd. Singles included "Time Is Movin'" and "Party Land", the former of which peaked at No. 15 on the US Billboard Hot Soul Singles chart, while the latter reached No. 30 on the same chart.

Saxophonist Stephen Johnson, who had played on the band's previous studio album City Life, was absent from this album, and the position was consequently filled by Wesley Jackson. Johnson returned to the band for their following record Action.

== Track listing ==
Song credits and timings taken from original LP.

Side One
No.	Title	Writer(s)	Length
1.	"Time Is Movin'"	Keith Killgo	4:42
2.	"In Life"	Kevin Toney, Orville Saunders, Killgo, Joe Hall	5:12
3.	"Enter In"	Hall	4:38
4.	"You've Got That Something"	Donald Byrd, Toney	4:18

Side Two
No.	Title	Writer(s)	Length
5.	"Party Land"	Byrd, Saunders	5:16
6.	"Lady"	Hall	6:30
7.	"Unfinished Business"	Toney	5:54

== Personnel ==
Credits taken from LP liner notes.

The Blackbyrds

- Kevin Toney – keyboards
- Orville Saunders – guitar
- Wesley Jackson – saxophone, flute
- Joe Hall – bass
- Keith Killgo – drums

with:

- Lew McCreary – bass trombone
- George Bohanon, Charles Loper – trombones
- Chuck Findley, Steve Madaio, Gary Grant, Nolan Smith – trumpets, flugelhorns
- Alan Robinson, Marilyn Robinson, Vince DeRosa – french horn
- William Green, Jackie Kelso (The Block Boy Orchestra) – tenor saxophone, baritone saxophone, flute
- The Blackbyrds, Mildred Lane (soloist), Jerry Spikes, Charles Barnett, Kenny Moore, Marti McCall, John Lehman, Alex Brown, Myrna Matthews Bill Medford, Jim Gilstrap – vocals

Soloists

- Ernie Watts – flute
- Tommy Morgan – harmonica
- Ray Parker – guitar

Technical

- George Bohanon – contractor
- Wade Marcus – arrangement and conducting
- Jim Nipar – recording engineers, mixing
- Serge Reyes – recording engineers, mixing assistant
- Phil Carroll – art direction, cover
- Phil Bray – cover, liner photos
- Lance Anderson – lettering
