= Pharos-Tribune =

American newspaper in Indiana, founded 1844

- Type: Daily newspaper
- Format: Broadsheet
- Owner(s): Community Newspaper Holdings Inc.
- Publisher: Robyn McCloskey
- Editor: Matt Weinstein
- Founded: 1844; 181 years ago
- Headquarters: 517 East Broadway; Logansport, Indiana 46947 USA
- Circulation: 10,259 daily
- Website: pharostribune.com

The Pharos-Tribune is a Monday through Saturday (Weekend Edition) morning newspaper based in Logansport, Indiana, covering Cass County, Indiana. The newspaper and its commercial printing facility in Logansport's Industrial Park are owned by Community Newspaper Holdings Inc.

== History ==
=== Early Pharos ===
The forerunner of the newspaper presently serving the six-county area was a four-page publication printed on a crude hand press brought to Logansport on a riverboat from Ohio by Samuel A. Hall in 1844. The journeyman printer christened his paper the Democratic Pharos and the first issue of the six-column paper appeared July 24 of that year.

The competition among newspapers in Cass County was exceptionally fierce. Some publications lasted only a few months; some lived for a few years. The list of discontinued newspapers undoubtedly offered 20-year-old Hall little encouragement that his publication would continue through the years, but it has.

Hall's staunch Democratic Party beliefs were reflected in the first edition of his paper. The editorial declared the publication to be “uncompromisingly Democratic,” and a biography of the Democratic candidate for president, James K. Polk, was included in the issue. The front page of the first edition contained only two headlines which were poetry and miscellany.

=== Daily newspaper ===
When the Democratic Pharos was launched, Logansport was a town of 1,800 people. On August 10, 1874, the weekly Democrat Pharos was changed to the Daily Pharos, and Logansport had grown to a city of nearly 9,000 people. The Daily Pharos was established under the management of Rufus Magee, who purchased the paper in 1869, a year prior to Hall's death.

Magee's interest in the paper was purchased July 1, 1875, by the Pharos Company composed of S.P. Sheerin, C.P. Knowlton, William Dolan and Mrs. S.A. Hall. The Pharos Company remained in control of the newspaper for two years when the publication was sold on November 18, 1877, to Benjamin F. Louthain and Milton Y. Todisman. Todisman retired a year later and was succeeded by Jerry Collins, who remained with the paper for a year.

Louthain, who held an active position in the paper's management, entered into partnership in 1881 with John W. Barnes. Remaining in the newspaper partnership for 32 years, these men mutually agreed to dissolve partnership in 1913, when the Daily Pharos and the Logansport Reporter consolidated on May 13, to form the Pharos-Reporter. The first issue of that paper appeared May 15. The consolidated Pharos-Reporter was owned and operated by the Pharos-Reporter Publishing Company with B.F. Louthain serving as president, treasurer and editor.

=== Merger with Reporter ===
The Logansport Daily Reporter was established by J.E. Sutton October 1, 1889, at 218 Sixth Street. Later the publication was moved to 525-27 East Broadway. Upon her husband's death, Mrs. Inez Sutton managed the Reporter until her son, Lindley R. Sutton, assumed the management when he became of age. They sported the distinction of being the first local paper to use a typesetting machine, perfection printing press and folder to print from a continuous roll of paper.

The merger of the Daily Pharos and the Logansport Reporter, both afternoon papers, left Logansport with the two daily papers instead of the four which had existed prior to the consolidation of the Logansport Journal and the Logansport Tribune. The Logansport Daily Tribune made its debut December 1, 1907, published by a stock company with E.F. and Harry Metzger and O.A. Cummins, as principal stockholders. B.F. Louthain, publisher of the Pharos-Reporter, died October 15, 1915, and his widow, Mrs. Matilda Louthain, became president of the Pharos-Reporter Publishing Company. A partial interest in the paper was purchased two years later by Samuel O. Berman.

On March 1, 1920, the Pharos-Reporter purchased the Journal-Tribune, a morning newspaper and the publications merged under the name of Pharos-Tribune. Mrs. Louthain continued as president with her son, W.R. Emslie, as secretary and manager and Berman as treasurer and assistant manager. The first edition of the Pharos-Tribune appeared March 15, 1920, published at 517 East Broadway, the present site of the newspaper.

In 1923, Berman, who operated a wholesale and retail sporting goods business in Logansport, was named publisher of the Pharos-Tribune. Berman became controlling stockholder in 1926. He was succeeded as general manager and publisher upon his death in 1938 by J.M. Druck, who remained as publisher until 1990. Mr. Druck's 53-year career as a publisher is believed to be the longest by any daily publisher in Indiana.

=== Purchase of Press ===
The Logansport Press, which had started publication June 14, 1921, was purchased by the Pharos-Tribune on March 1, 1949, and moved that fall from 309-11 East Broadway to the Pharos-Tribune Building. The papers were combined only in the mechanical and business aspect, as the editorial, news and circulation departments of both papers remained completely separate.

In January 1966, Howard Publications, headed by Robert S. Howard, purchased the majority interest in both local papers, and shortly thereafter 100 percent acquisition of the ownership. The final step in Logansport's consolidation of newspapers took place October 3, 1966, when the Pharos-Tribune and Logansport Press combined to publish the first edition of the Pharos-Tribune and Press.

=== Outside owners ===
The Pharos-Tribune moved into its present building in 1983. In 1995, Howard Publications traded the Pharos-Tribune to Canadian-owned Thomson Corporation in exchange for the Valparaiso Vidette-Messenger.

In 1990, William C. Blake replaced J.M. Druck, who retired as publisher of the Pharos-Tribune. He was replaced in 1996 by interim publisher Arden Draeger who filled the position for a short time. In April 1997, Dollie Turpin-Cromwell became publisher of the Pharos-Tribune after a year of having the position vacant. She was replaced in November 1998 by Wayne Lowman.

In 2000, Thompson Newspapers sold the Pharos-Tribune, along with 48 other daily U.S. newspapers. Thompson retained the (Toronto) The Globe and Mail, and have put their focus on doing business electronically. On September 1, 2000, Community Newspaper Holdings, Inc (cnhiMedia) acquired 17 daily newspapers from Thompson Newspapers Inc. that included the Pharos-Tribune. The Birmingham-based cnhi was founded in 1997 and is a privately held communications company. The Pharos-Tribune is the third largest property of cnhiMedia's 14 Indiana publications. On January 3, 2001, Robyn McCloskey was named the new publisher of the Pharos-Tribune.

The Pharos-Tribune went from printing seven days a week, to five days a week in June 2020. The paper switched from carrier to postal delivery in January 2025.
