= The Glasgow Courier =

Weekly newspaper published in Glasgow, Montana

- The Voice of Valley County
- Type: Weekly newspaper
- Owner(s): Gary Stevenson, Robb Hicks
- Founder: Charles E. Hall
- Founded: April 1892 (as Valley County News)
- Language: English
- Headquarters: 341 3rd Avenue South; Glasgow, Montana 59230
- City: Glasgow, Montana
- Country: United States
- Circulation: 2,653 (as of January 2015)
- Sister newspapers: Hi‑Line Farm & Ranch
- ISSN: 2378-8305
- OCLC number: 12317058
- Website: glasgowcourier.com

The Glasgow Courier is a weekly newspaper in Glasgow, Montana, USA, published on Wednesdays.

== History ==
In April 1892, Charles E. Hall established the Valley County News in Glasgow, Montana. In June 1893, R.X. Lewis assumed control of the News and renamed it to the Valley County Gazette. J.J. Amiott succeeded R.X. Lewis at the Gazette and in May 1899, renamed the paper to the North Montana Review.

After several years Amiott was succeeded by R.H. Copeland, who resigned from the Review and turned it over to new management in February 1909. Col. C.E. Hinton, of Minneapolis, was named managing editor and the paper was renamed to the Glasgow Democrat.

In July 1910, Rev. Leonard J. Christler bought the Democrat and renamed it to The Montana Citizen. In January 1911, the Citizen was sold to Harry W. Franklyn, owner of the Saco Observer in Saco. In September 1911, J.T. Farris, owner of The Montana Homestead in Hinsdale, purchased the Citizen and renamed it to the Valley County Independent.

In May 1913, T.J. Hocking bought out G.H. Coulter's interest in the Culbertson Republican in Culbertson, thus becoming its sole owner. He sold the paper that July to Frank S. Reed, owner of the Culbertson Searchlight, who combined the two. Hocking then bought the Independent from Farris. Starting with the August 8, 1913, issue, the paper's name was changed to the Glasgow Courier.

In August 1958, the newly formed Glasgow Publishing Company acquired the paper from Hocking. It was made up of investors affiliated with Scripps League Newspapers and Howard Publications. In March 1964, Harold H. Smith, of Pocatello, Idaho bought the paper. In December 1972, Clifford W. Cox, who previously worked at the Camarillo Daily News in California, bought the paper from Smith. The paper eventually fell into the hands of his decedent, Bruce Wright, who sold it in September 2003 to Robb Hicks, Tom Mullen and Gary Stevenson.
