= Sherman's Lagoon =

American comic strip

- "Sherman's Lagoon" title bar. From left to right: Hawthorne the crab, Sherman the shark, and Fillmore the turtle
- Author: Jim Toomey
- Current status/schedule: Running
- Launch date: May 13, 1991; 35 years ago (in Escondido Times-Advocate)
- Syndicate(s): Pacific Press Features (1991); Creators Syndicate (1991–1997); King Features Syndicate (1997–2022); Andrews McMeel Syndication (2022-present)
- Publisher: Andrews McMeel Publishing
- Genre: Humor

Sherman's Lagoon is a daily comic strip by Jim Toomey that is widely syndicated in newspapers worldwide after its first appearance in the Escondido Times-Advocate of Escondido, California, on May 13, 1991.

The story of Sherman's Lagoon takes place in the fictional Kapupu Lagoon by the island of Kapupu in the South Pacific Ocean, west of the similarly fictional Elabaob Islands in the Palauan archipelago of Micronesia. It is centered on the misadventures of a lazy, overweight great white shark named Sherman, along with his controlling, hot-tempered wife Megan and the friends and foes who share their tropical home.

== Style ==
The strip's humor is aimed at late teens and adults, with frequent lampoons of famous pop culture icons, and occasional jabs at political figures.

For the most part, the strip's characters respond to killing prey to eat with indifference or coldness, as much of the plot revolves around what Sherman and Megan are going to eat for dinner. For instance, one comic had Megan declaring she was in the mood for Italian and the two sharks immediately sought to find an Italian swimming in the water. Also, a large group of tourists swimming in the lagoon is referred to as 'the buffet'. Poodles are regarded as a delicacy, and Sherman regularly eats smaller fish that swim by. One strip saw a fish committing suicide by swimming into Sherman's mouth while he yawned. Characters have also been seen going to shark-themed restaurants. ('Leg of Pam', 'Bloody Mary's, and 'Beans and Frank' have been named from the menu.) However, on one occasion Megan pulled a tourist under, then let him go unscathed, thus practicing her method of catch and release.

The strip occasionally breaks the fourth wall, with characters acknowledging that they are living in a comic strip. One such strip had Sherman asking Hawthorne when their new video series (called 'Barnacle the Purple Arthropod', a parody of Barney the Dinosaur) would be produced, and Hawthorne replying 'It's only been one panel.' 'Felt like two.' Another strip parodied Peanuts, with Hawthorne holding a football and Fillmore running to kick it. The ball rebounded off the side of the panel and hit Fillmore in the head (this incident followed a conversation they had in which Hawthorne told Fillmore that he wouldn't pull the ball away like Lucy Van Pelt because 'We aren't living in a comic strip').

== Characters ==
=== The Sharks ===
==== Sherman ====
The main character of the strip. Sherman is overweight, lazy and an eating machine. His immaturity and childlike personality frustrates his wife, Megan, to no end, and provides ample opportunities for some of his friends to blindly rip him off. Although not the most intelligent of all the characters, Sherman is a good-hearted great white shark and often tries to please his friends and family, but most of the time falls short because of his low IQ. On rare occasions, he has been shown bringing Megan gifts for no special reason and acting romantic; however, these instances are few and far between and most of the time he's obnoxious, lazy and hopelessly out of touch with his wife. Some strips imply he cross-dresses. He often baits "hairless beach apes" with a variety of items attached to the end of a fishing rod, including beer bottles, wallets, and other props. In addition, Sherman likes to fight giant squid, sometimes for dinner, sometimes just for fun, and at least once over a loan. Dolphins and giant squids are his two seaborne enemies. One recurring storyline is the 'roadtrips' he takes with his best friend Ernest to places like the Ganges River, the Nile, the Amazon, and various other places. In a serial published in 2004, he and his wife Megan had a baby shark whom they named Herman. Since then, some of the strip's serials have focused on Sherman and Megan's amusing attempts to care for their newborn child. A series of strips brought in the concept of shark finning and Sherman was actually 'finned' and died. In 'Shark Heaven' the angel said there were already too many sharks there, so he would give him a second chance.

==== Megan ====
Sherman's controlling wife. She always wears a string of pearls around her neck (this also distinguishes her from Sherman in the black-and-white strips during the week). She quite possibly possesses the most fiery temper and personality of the comic strip, and easily intimidates other characters to get her own way. Hawthorne considers her a bossy control freak. Fillmore is downright terrified of her and also considers her a control freak. She is a perfectionist and a control freak; however, she can be just as lazy as her husband. She seldom if ever listens to her husband (which is implied in a strip to be part of the reason Sherman married her since he says a lot of stupid things). Her activities include cooking, shopping, caring for Herman, fishing for humans with Sherman, and often threatening Hawthorne for a number of practical jokes played on her. She almost always ends up coming to her husband's rescue, whether saving him from a swarm of tiger prawns or preventing Hawthorne from stealing all his money. Although she often expresses her frustration with Sherman (and has threatened him more than once) she does love him deep down. She is an avid follower of Martha Stewart and has thrown parties in her honor in several strips. A semi-recurring storyline is Megan's attempts to be accepted into rich clubs, one of them being SnobCrest. However she is always turned away, either because of Sherman or her own rough personality. On occasion, Megan has also fought giant squids. She can also be a bit mean spirited. Megan decides to run for school president because she wants to have unlimited power and immediate approval for her every whim.

==== Herman ====
Son of Megan and Sherman. His birth appeared in the April 26, 2004 daily strip after a serialization on Megan's pregnancy that first appeared in the January 25, 2004 Sunday strip. He was named after one of Sherman's brothers. Shortly after his birth, he suffered from an eye disease that placed both eyeballs on the side of his head. Sherman confessed to Megan that it was the result of a recessive flounder gene in his side of the family (incidentally, Sherman also used this opportunity to tell Megan that he never thought Seinfeld was funny). He appears to be a good, well-behaved child, only going out of control when Fillmore volunteered to babysit him (although when he was given a bucket in which to put his toys, the only thing he managed to do was pee in it). He appears to take after his father, once coming in first place in a baby drooling contest. Now, though, he talks and grows up like a normal kid.

==== Herman #2 ====
Sherman's annoying and obnoxious twin brother who takes up residence in Lake Erie. He is hated by Megan and not regarded fondly by his brother (who was given 'good-morning' swirlies by him as a child). He's also shown ignorance, as when introduced to Thornton he thought the bear was Polish because he was from the North Pole. Herman met his death twice in the series: once when Megan 'accidentally' harpooned him at the breakfast table, and again when he willingly donated his brain in lieu of Sherman's, who went brain dead from watching too much of the O.J. trial. When the other characters found Sherman's brain (which had been taken by a fish during surgery) they decided to freeze Herman's in tin foil rather than try to return it. He has not been seen in the strip since.

==== Rupert ====
Sherman's nephew. He was a minor character in earlier strips, showing up now and then to be educated by Sherman, as Herman hadn't been born yet. His character wasn't developed much and his appearances were few and far between. He soaked up everything Sherman told him, even adopting his now retired catchphrase, "Can I eat this?"

=== The Turtles ===
==== Fillmore ====
The lonely bachelor sea turtle of the comic strip. Fillmore's hobbies include reading, caring for his adopted son, and having as many conversations with the other sea creatures as possible. Most of the time he is seen simply leaning against a rock reading a novel, and acts as sort of a straight man for the other more outgoing characters. Once a year, Fillmore makes the long trip to Ascension Island in hopes of finding a permanent mate. However, he strikes out every year, due to his hopeless nerdiness, his complete lack of ability to even engage in a simple conversation with a girl, his overpowering cologne, and his pompous, arrogant attitude. However, he once won the Ascension Island challenge and had an entire island of she-turtles to himself. He promptly fainted from shock and missed out again. He has come close on a few occasions, but the only female to ever fall completely in love with him was an enormous sea elephant, thanks to Ernest's 'pheromone cologne'. One serial even saw the turtle transform into a woman for nearly two months of the comic's duration because he hadn't had a mate for so long. During one trip to Ascension Island, he found a baby sea turtle and adopted him, naming him Clayton. He wishes his lagoon neighbors would act more sophisticated and has been shown watching Masterpiece Theater and operas. He possesses a kind heart, and most of the time simply wants someone to talk to. He is also somewhat controlling as he is often quick to criticize. He has stated in one strip that he is a Virgo. He is also completely unaware of his own faults despite his friends pointing them out. This suggests he has a narcissistic personality.

==== Clayton ====
Fillmore's adopted son. He was found hatching on the beach after Fillmore arrived on Ascension Island for nesting season (only to find that the entire event had been canceled). The moment he was born, Clayton was nearly devoured by a seagull, but was saved by Fillmore. Clayton's first words are thought to be "300 megahertz microprocessor," but he is seen speaking earlier in the strip's history. Clayton attends boarding school, though he occasionally comes home to visit his father and figurative "Uncle Sherman". His computer skills possibly match those of Ernest, as he once stated that he could make eBay crash. Clayton is usually seen wearing a baseball cap.

=== The Fish ===
==== Ernest ====
The brainy fish of the strip. He is Sherman's best friend, as they share the same maturity level (due to Ernest's young age). He wears thick, oversized glasses on his nose. Ernest can gain access to virtually any computer in the world and has hacked into almost every file on the internet (he once ordered Vermont to declare war on Canada). He is also known for his crazy inventions, such as a chip that takes control of peoples' brains. He also built a probe and sent it to Mars. Unfortunately, it was destroyed by Sherman. He has gone on many adventures with Sherman to exotic places in the world, such as the sunken RMS Titanic, the Amazon River, the Ganges, and a Russian lake in Abkhazia. On one of their adventures they found themselves in a fountain in Las Vegas and ended up gambling away all their money in a casino (as well as several of Sherman's teeth). Like Hawthorne, he hates Bill Gates. He is seldom the central character in the strip's serials; his role is usually solving the lagoon's problems. He once used his computer skills to crash a tanker filled with Prozac in the lagoon to stop a pod of suicidal whales from beaching themselves. On occasion, he is the cause of the lagoon's problems (in one strip he tapped into an undersea cable and caused a worldwide telecommunications failure). He was also almost arrested once for illegally downloading every movie on the planet, but wired them all into Fillmore's computer, causing him to be sent to prison instead. Little is known about his family, though earlier strips showed him being one of several dozen brothers and sisters.

==== Bob ====
Bob the Bottom Dweller is a bottom-feeding sea creature whose species is unspecified, though he might be a type of flounder. He's most often referred to as "One of those really ugly fish." He doesn't speak too often, aside from belching, and has a habit of eating stuff found on the bottom of the sea. Before Fillmore and Sherman discovered this, they thought he was singing opera, but they later discovered that he had swallowed a radio. In earlier strips he was less ugly and could talk, once being shown doing a Groucho Marx impression. In another strip he pulled a gun on the other characters for making fun of him. One of his few speaking lines was a shrill, "AAGH! I'm hideous!" after he wore a cursed necklace that made him look like Ted Koppel. Bob has returned to the strip in his original largely mute form: a spotted, big-lipped fish with bulging, misshapen eyes and a belching habit. Fillmore once called him 'an angry and sociopathic belcher'.

=== Other ===
==== Hawthorne ====
The scheming hermit crab of the strip. He is rude, abrasive, insulting, stingy, and a criminal. Hawthorne, unlike other hermit crabs, prefers a beer can rather than a seashell. His interests include scamming the other members of the strip out of money or resources, cracking jokes and insults, and pinching hairless beach apes (and Sherman). A recurring storyline is Hawthorne's many get-rich-quick schemes and business ventures, usually tailored to rip his friends off. Some of his businesses have included a general store, a photo lab, an airline, a bank, a nuclear power plant, and a casino. His businesses usually flop, either due to bankruptcy, his own incompetence, or his losing interest in his own scheme. His ownership of the local newspaper, the Lagoon Tribune, appears to be the only business he has been able to manage through the course of the strip. He is also the Lagoon's mayor from time to time. Later strips imply that he's been in jail. Other ventures of his included using steroids on an oyster to get him to produce a pearl a day (eventually, Megan, not knowing that the oyster was Hawthorne's, took it to make a Martha Stewart-style oyster provencalê for dinner). In earlier strips, Hawthorne would shed his shell once a year and simply strut around naked (nothing but his rear-end is seen). He also enjoyed mooning scuba divers and his friends and running around singing "I feel pretty! Oh, so pretty!" However, it later seems that he has removed his can for good and walks around in the buff, and his friends don't show the disgust they did in earlier comics. His crab hole has been portrayed several different ways. Early on in the strip it was shown as a posh cave mansion with chandeliers, rugs, china cabinets, and luxurious furniture. It has been portrayed as the typical bachelor pad, housing a beat-up couch and socks and pizza crusts that move on their own. Although little is known about his past, he once revealed to Thornton that he was born in Las Vegas. He hates Windows computers, and therefore Bill Gates as well, once taking great pleasure in pinching his toes.

==== Thornton ====
The sleepy, hibernating polar bear of the strip. His first appearance was early on in the strip, when he apparently fell asleep on an iceberg and drifted into the lagoon. He has made it a point to show up every year to hibernate on the beach, sometimes not returning to the North Pole at all. He was much more active in early strips, as he was depicted waterskiing and attending windsurfing classes. He struggled with homesickness when first introduced, saying that piña coladas reminded him of the snowdrifts of home. When asked why he kept returning to the lagoon, he replied that the snowdrifts reminded him of piña coladas. He was shown once at the North Pole, accompanied by Hawthorne. There, his polar bear friends simultaneously guzzle Coca-Colas and the 'pole' has been replaced by a Starbucks. Among other things, he sometimes serves as a guinea pig for Ernest's experiments, once testing a mousse that made his hair fall out (he apparently has a tattoo on his butt that he got in the army). His relationship with Sherman has been portrayed as both a friendship and a rivalry. He loves to eat frozen tundra-lemmings, and has bragged of devouring an entire team of Russian scientists and their sled dogs. He grew more inactive as the strip progressed, being too lazy to even attend the birthday party Fillmore threw for him. He is mostly shown napping on the beach and drinking a smoothie out of a martini glass.

==== Captain Quigley ====
The ever-persistent fisherman trying to hunt down Sherman. Their rivalry apparently goes back years. Sherman once stated, "My mother ate his mother." Quigley has used a number of different tools in his quest to catch Sherman, ranging from an ordinary fishing pole to a killer robot dolphin. One of his more elaborate traps was an exquisite chicken dinner laid on good china on a table with linen cloth (Sherman didn't buy it because he didn't believe red wine should be served with that dish). He caught Sherman once; however, Hawthorne rescued him 'commando style' by rigging the fishing trawler to blow up; unfortunately, he forgot to get Sherman off first and almost killed him in the process. He also may have captured Fillmore. He seems to be constantly outwitted by the shark and his friends.

==== Kahuna ====
An undersea statue. He is possibly a deity, as stated in one strip, and is reminiscent of the moai on Easter Island. The other characters come to Kahuna for wisdom, though Kahuna's logic cannot always be trusted as he was unable to help Ernest solve a simple word problem. He's also known to have magic tiki powers. A recurring story element involves him transforming various characters (usually Sherman, Fillmore, and Hawthorn) into humans so they can attend activities such as a Rolling Stones concert, a Super Bowl, and others. On one occasion, it was said that he transformed Sherman into a Q-Tip for his own personal use. His arch-rival, a Polynesian fish deity, is Apo-Ko-Hai. A war was nearly started between the two because of Sherman's gluttony, but Fillmore ended the conflict peacefully (except for Sherman, whom he made dress up like Dolly Parton). Kahuna has little tolerance for beer, and has stated that he is 800 years old. Revealed in a series of 2020 strips, Kahuna will lose his powers and turn into a normal statue unless he stands under a magic waterfall on a certain island in the lagoon every 500 years.

==== Broderick ====
A past character who is not remembered. He is a seahorse who wears thick glasses similar to Ernest's and a striped tie. His character wasn't developed much, as he often appeared in crowd scenes or strips where another straight man was needed. His character was retired in the early 1990s.

=== Enemies ===
==== The Giant Squid ====
Sherman's arch-rival. He is fat and has short tentacles and two bulging eyes. He has only spoken once in the strip. Otherwise, he makes noises that sound a lot like flatulence. His role is to fight Sherman and he is usually the victor (he was shown getting eaten in one strip, but this could have been another giant squid). In one strip, Sherman found that he could not beat the squid at his own game of (Twister), and challenged him to a Monopoly match. They have also been seen playing chess, but once again resorted to violence to solve their differences. He had not been seen in the strip for several years, leading many fans to speculate that his character had been retired. However, he showed up in a later strip at a fancy restaurant where he fought Sherman, leaving him in the end twisted into a pretzel.

==== The Dolphin ====
Another of Sherman's enemies. Like the giant squid, the dolphin usually gets the best of Sherman, though he does so by outsmarting the shark rather than fighting him (a reference to the high intelligence of real dolphins). The dolphin regularly takes advantage of Sherman's stupidity, such as asking to borrow his credit card or asking him for two ten-dollar bills as change for a five-dollar bill. Sherman once attempted to have him and the dolphin sign a peace treaty, only to have the dolphin trick Sherman into signing a contract leaving all of his possessions to him in the event of his demise, followed by a contract donating all of Sherman's organs for immediate research.

==== Gary ====
Gary is a large blue fish who is the most prominent member of Northside Lagoon, the rival to Kapupu Lagoon. He frequently appears when causing mischief in Kapupu Lagoon or when both Lagoons are competing in the Annual Lagoon Challenge, with Northside Lagoon always winning due to in part the incompetence of the Kapupu Lagoon challengers. In June 2021, Kapupu Lagoon finally did win the annual challenge, partly due to unsportsmanlike conduct on their part.

== Books ==
=== Collections ===
A collection is 128 pages, and covers a one- or two-year span of material previously published in daily newspapers.

#	Title	Publication Date	Year(s) Covered	ISBN
1	Sherman's Lagoon: Ate That, What's Next?	September 1997	1996	ISBN 978-0836236606
2	Poodle: The Other White Meat	April 1999	1998	ISBN 978-0836282870
3	An Illustrated Guide to Shark Etiquette	September 2000	1999	ISBN 978-0740712470
4	Another Day in Paradise	September 2001	1997	ISBN 978-0740720123
5	Greetings From Sherman's Lagoon	April 2002	1992–1993	ISBN 978-0740721922
6	Surf's Up!	April 2003	1994–1995	ISBN 978-0740733093
7	Shark Diaries	September 2003	2002	ISBN 978-0740738159
8	Catch of the Day	September 2004	2003	ISBN 978-0740746703
9	A Day at the Beach	April 2005	2000–2001	ISBN 978-0740751301
10	Surfer Safari	September 2005	2004	ISBN 978-0740754524
11	Planet of the Hairless Beach Apes	September 2006	2005	ISBN 978-0740760563
12	Yarns and Shanties and Other Nautical Baloney	September 2007	2006	ISBN 978-0740765575
13	Sharks Just Wanna Have Fun	September 2008	2007	ISBN 978-0740773877
14	Confessions of a Swinging Single Sea Turtle	September 2009	2008	ISBN 978-0740785511
15	Discover Your Inner Hermit Crab	August 2010	2009	ISBN 978-0740791109
16	Never Bite Anything That Bites Back	October 2011	2010	ISBN 978-1449407995
17	Think Like a Shark: Avoiding a Porpoise-Driven Life	October 2012	2011	ISBN 978-1449424046
18	Here We Go Again	October 2013	2012	ISBN 978-1449441623
19	Lunch Wore a Speedo	October 7, 2014	2013	ISBN 978-1449457990
20	Tales from the Deep: That Are Completely Fabricated	September 22, 2015	2014	ISBN 978-1449462994
21	Happy as a Clam	September 20, 2016	2015	ISBN 978-1449477837
22	Onward and Downward	2017	2016	ISBN 978-1449485092
23	The Adventures of Superfish and His Superfishal Friends	October 2018	2017	ISBN 978-1449485108
24	If You Can’t Beat ‘Em, Eat ‘Em	October 2019	2018	ISBN 978-1524851798
25	Evolution Is Hard Work!	October 2020	2019	ISBN 978-1524860745
26	Adventures in Aquaculture	October 2021	2020	ISBN 978-1524869199
27	You Need This Book Like a Fish Needs a Bicycle	October 2022	2021	ISBN 978-1524875619
28	Things Are Looking Up	October 2023	2022	ISBN 978-1524880958
29	Crabbily Ever After	November 2024	2024	ISBN 978-1524887810
30	A Giant Squid Walks Into a Bar...	October 2025	2025	ISBN 979-8881601607
31	Attack of the Jumbo Shrimp	November 2026	2026	ISBN 979-8881601614

=== Treasuries ===
A treasury is 256 pages, features the "best of" a five- or ten-year span, and contains comics, most of which have been previously published in the collections.

Title	Publication Date	Years Included	ISBN
Greatest Hits & Near Misses	September 2002	1991–2001	ISBN 978-0740726767
In Shark Years I'm Dead	March 2006	2001–2005	ISBN 978-0740757020
