= Action (The Blackbyrds album) =

Studio album by the Blackbyrds
- Released: September 1, 1977
- Recorded: 1977
- Studio: The Sound Factory
- Genres: R&B; jazz-funk
- Length: 33:45
- Label: Fantasy
- Producer: Donald Byrd

The Blackbyrds chronology
Unfinished Business (1976)	Action (1977)	Night Grooves (1978)

Singles from Action
- 1. "Street Games" / "Soft and Easy" Released: 1977; 2. "Soft and Easy" / "Something Special" Released: 1977; 3. "Supernatural Feeling" / "Soft and Easy" Released: 1978

Action is the fifth studio album by American R&B/jazz-fusion band the Blackbyrds, released in 1977 on Fantasy Records. The album peaked at No. 43 on the US Billboard Top Pop LPs chart and No. 8 on the US Billboard Top Soul LPs chart. It has also been certified Gold in the US by the RIAA.

== Critical reception ==
Professional ratings
Review scores
Source	Rating
AllMusic	3/5 stars

Ed Hogan reviewed the album for AllMusic in a somewhat positive light. He said, "If you had to own only one album by the Blackbyrds then Action should be it." He reasoned that "all the elements came together for the Donald Byrd protégés" and he singled out "Supernatural Feeling" for its wise lyrics as well as "Something Special" and "Dreaming About You" for their smooth jazz feel.

== Band members' thoughts ==
Drummer Keith Killgo briefly referenced the album during a 2022 interview with East of the River News when recounting the band's history.

"I would have to say that 'Soft and Easy' is my favorite song out of all the Blackbyrds compositions. It is a ballad but then it is really not. I love 'Mysterious Vibes' too."

== Track listing ==
Side one
No.	Title	Writer(s)	Length
1.	"Supernatural Feeling"	Orville Saunders, Kevin Toney	3:47
2.	"Lookin' Ahead"	Toney	5:30
3.	"Mysterious Vibes"	Keith Killgo	4:46
4.	"Something Special"	Killgo	4:43

Side two
No.	Title	Writer(s)	Length
1.	"Street Games"	Toney	4:45
2.	"Soft and Easy"	Saunders	4:25
3.	"Dreaming About You"	Toney	5:49

== Personnel ==
The Blackbyrds

- Kevin Toney – acoustic piano and ARP synthesizers
- Keith Killgo – drums
- Joe Hall – bass
- Orville Saunders – guitar
- Stephen Johnson – saxophone

with:

- Ernie Watts – tenor saxophone, soprano saxophone
- Ray Parker, Jr. – guitar
- Ollie Brown – vocals (with the Block Boys Orchestra), drums, percussion
- Eddie "Bongo" Brown – congas
- David Shields – bass
- Donald Byrd – trumpet
- The Block Boys Orchestra singers (Jim Gilstrap, John Lehman, Roy Galloway, Bill Threadford, Ollie Brown, Ronnie Mayez) – vocals

Production

- Phil Carroll – art direction
- Gerald Panopolous – photography
- Lance Anderson – design
- Wade Marcus – arranging and conducting
- George Bohanon – horn contractor
- Charles Veal, Jr. – concertmaster and string contractor
- Jim Nipar – recording and remix engineer
- Serge Reyes – assistant engineer
- Mike Reese – engineer

== Charts ==
=== Album ===
Chart (1977)	Peak position
US Billboard Top LPs	43
US Top Soul LPs	8

=== Singles ===
Year	Single	Chart	Position
1977	"Soft and Easy"	Hot Soul Singles	20
1978	"Supernatural Feeling"	Hot Soul Singles	19
