= Howard Publications =

American newspaper publisher

- Type: Private
- Industry: Newspapers
- Founded: 1955
- Founder: Robert "Bob" Staples Howard
- Defunct: 2002
- Headquarters: Oceanside, California
- Owner: Lee Enterprises

Howard Publications was a family-owned company of newspapers in the United States. It was based in Oceanside, California and owned 16 daily newspapers when it sold to Lee Enterprises for $694 million in 2002.

== History ==
=== Origins ===
Robert "Bob" Staples Howard was born on October 23, 1924. His parents operated a small weekly newspaper in Wheaton, Minnesota called the Wheaton Gazette. Bob Howard left the University of Minnesota to serve as a Second lieutenant in the United States Army Air Corps flying bombers in the South Pacific during World War II. He earned a Purple Heart after being shot down in the Battle of Leyte. After the war, he returned to University and then helped his widowed mother operate the Gazette.

Howard then worked for a number of papers across the country until he purchased the Dalles Chronicle in December 1948. Scripps League Newspapers became a co-owner with Howard in June 1949, with the joint-venture called Western Publishing Company. In October 1949, Western Publishing purchased a stake in the Tribune Journal Company, which published the Idaho State Journal. Howard then moved from The Dalles, Oregon to Pocatello, Idaho to help manage the business. After moving, Howard helped manage the Daily Inter Lake in Montana, which Scripps owned.

In October 1955, Howard purchased the Chester Times, which was later renamed to the Delaware County Daily Times. This acquisition marked the start of the Howard Publications newspaper chain. At this time Howard left Scripps and disposed of any interests he had with the company.

=== Expansion ===
In August 1958, Howard became co-owner of The Glasgow Courier. He sold the Daily Times in June 1961. He then purchased the Casper Tribune-Herald and Casper Morning Star in October 1961, The Times of Northwest Indiana in May 1962, sold The Glasgow Courier in March 1964, and bought the Logansport Pharos-Tribune in January 1966. Howard became co-owner of Coastline Publishers in September 1966. The company published The Coastline Dispatch, San Clemente Sun-Post and Dana Point Lamplighter. The subsidiary purchased the San Clemente Independent in January 1967.

Howard Publications acquired the Oceanside Blade-Tribune in March 1967, Twin Falls Times-News in April 1968, Carlisle Sentinel in May 1968, The Post-Star and The Glens Falls Times in December 1970. Howard became of co-owner of the Sioux City Journal with Hagadone Corporation, an affiliate of Scripps League Newspapers, in December 1971. The company then acquired the Corning Leader in May 1972, Times-Courier in December 1972, Journal Gazette in March 1973, The Auburn Citizen in July 1975, Freeport Journal Standard in September 1976, San Dieguito Citizen in May 1979, The Ledger Independent in October 1980, The Times and Democrat in May 1981, Waterloo Courier and Cedar Falls Record in January 1983. The Oceanside Blade-Tribune, San Dieguito Citizen and two other papers were merged to form the North County Blade-Citizen in June 1989. Howard purchased The Longview Daily News in June 1999.

=== Sell-off ===
In March 1993, Howard sold the San Clemente Sun-Post to Freedom Communications. In July 1995, Howard agreed to acquire the Times Advocate Company, a subsidiary of Tribune Company. The sale included the Escondido Times-Advocate, The Californian of Temecula, and The Enterprise of Fallbrook. Howard operated a subsidiary called South Coast Newspapers, which published the North County Blade-Citizen of Oceanside. The Times-Advocate and Blade-Citizen were merged to form the North County Times.

In August 1995, Howard traded the Logansport Pharos-Tribune to Thomson Corporation in exchange for The Valparaiso Vidette-Messenger, later renamed to the Vidette Times. On February 12, 2002, Lee Enterprises announced that it would acquire Howard Publications for $694 million, with a closing later that year. At the time of the sale, Howard employed 2,400 people, and its papers had a total daily circulation of 479,000. Company founder R.S. Howard died in February 2022.

== List of previously owned newspapers ==
Name	Location	Year acquired	Fate
Casper Star-Tribune	Casper, Wyoming	1961	Sold to Lee Enterprises in 2002
The Citizen	Auburn, New York	1975	Sold to Lee Enterprises in 2002
The Daily News	Longview, Washington	1999	Sold to Lee Enterprises in 2002
Delaware County Daily Times.	Chester, Pennsylvania	1955	Sold to private investors in 1961
Escondido Times-Advocate	Escondido, California	1995	Merged with Blade-Citizen in 1995
The Glasgow Courier (co-owned)	Glasgow, Montana	1957	Sold to private investors in 1964
Journal Gazette	Mattoon, Illinois	1973	Sold to Lee Enterprises in 2002
The Journal Standard	Freeport, Illinois	1976	Sold to Lee Enterprises in 2002
The Leader	Corning, New York	1972	Sold to Lee Enterprises in 2002
The Ledger Independent	Maysville, Kentucky	1980	Sold to Lee Enterprises in 2002
North County Times	Escondido, California	1995	Sold to Lee Enterprises in 2002
North County Blade-Citizen	Oceanside, California	1989	Merged with Times-Advocate in 1995
Oceanside Blade-Tribune	Oceanside, California	1967	Merged with San Dieguito Citizen in 1989
Pharos-Tribune	Logansport, Indiana	1966	Sold to Thomson Corporation in 1995
The Post-Star	Glens Falls, New York	1970	Sold to Lee Enterprises in 2002
San Clemente Sun-Post	San Clemente, California	1966	Sold to Freedom Communications in 1993
San Dieguito Citizen	Solana Beach, California	1979	Merged with Blade-Tribune in 1989
The Sentinel	Carlisle, Pennsylvania	1968	Sold to Lee Enterprises in 2002
Sioux City Journal (half-owned)	Sioux City, Iowa	1971	Sold to Lee Enterprises in 2002
Times-Courier	Charleston, Illinois	1972	Sold to Lee Enterprises in 2002
Times-News	Twin Falls, Idaho	1968	Sold to Lee Enterprises in 2002
The Times and Democrat	Orangeburg, South Carolina	1981	Sold to Lee Enterprises in 2002
The Times of Northwest Indiana	Munster, Indiana	1962	Sold to Lee Enterprises in 2002
The Vidette Messenger	Valparaiso, Indiana	1995	Renamed to Vidette Times, later merged into Munster Times
Waterloo Courier	Waterloo, Iowa	1983	Sold to Lee Enterprises in 2002
