= Mary Jacobus =

American journalist

- Born: February 11, 1957
- Died: February 20, 2009 (aged 52); Tampa, Florida
- Education: Le Moyne College, 1979
- Occupation: Newspaper Executive
- Title: President and COO (2006), The New York Times, Regional Media Group
- Spouse: Dean Jacobus
- Children: 3

Mary Jacobus (February 11, 1957 – February 20, 2009) was an American journalist. She was an executive with The New York Times Company, serving as president and general manager of The Boston Globe from January through September 2006, and then, until her death in February 2009, heading the company's Regional Media Group, overseeing 15 daily newspapers and several other publications. She also served on the board of The Associated Press.

== Early life and education ==
Jacobus was raised in Buffalo, New York. She obtained her degree in 1979, from Le Moyne College, in Syracuse, New York.

== Career ==
In the 70s, Jacobus worked for The Buffalo Courier-Express, The Buffalo News, and The Long Beach Press-Telegram where she was responsible for advertising.

She also worked as vice president of sales and marketing at The Gazette and director of sales and marketing for the Escondido Times-Advocate.

In January 2006, Jacobus began working for the Times; a mere eight months later, she became president and chief operating officer of the Times Regional Media Group. She was also on the executive committee. Since 2007, she served on the Audit Bureau of Circulations. Prior to working for the Times Company, Jacobus spent seven years in the Knight Ridder chain where she began as president and publisher of The Duluth News Tribune. She was later a publisher of The News-Sentinel and president and chief executive of Fort Wayne Newspapers.

== Death ==
Jacobus died February 20, 2009, in Tampa, Florida, at the age of 52, from a cerebral hemorrhage. At the time of her death, she lived in Tampa with her husband, Dean Jacobus and her three children, triplets, Kelly, Kimberly, and Bill.

In October 2009, Jacobus was honored posthumously, with the Frank W. Mayborn Award, by the Southern Newspaper Publishers Association. The award is presented to outstanding publishers and editors, in recognition of their leadership and contributions to the newspaper industry. It was the first time that the award had been given posthumously. The family, Dean, and her three children were each given a Frabel sculpture inscribed with the words: "This sculpture, called 'Ascendency,' was chosen by the Southern Newspaper Publishers Association to honor Mary Jacobus for her vision, leadership and contributions to the newspaper industry."
