= The Journal Standard =

American daily newspaper

- Type: Daily newspaper
- Owner: USA Today Co.
- Publisher: Paul Gaier
- Editor: Wally Haas
- Founded: 1848, as Freeport Journal
- Headquarters: 27 South State Avenue, Freeport, Illinois 61032, United States
- Circulation: 4,140 daily 4,893 Sunday (as of 2018)
- OCLC number: 11087856
- Website: journalstandard.com

The Journal Standard is an American daily newspaper published Tuesday thru Sunday in Freeport, Illinois, by USA Today Co. for readers in Carroll, Jo Daviess, Ogle and Stephenson counties.

In 2002, Lee Enterprises acquired Howard Publications, and then sold the paper two years later to Liberty Group Publishing.
