= The Times and Democrat =

Newspaper in Orangeburg, South Carolina

- Type: Daily newspaper
- Format: Broadsheet
- Owner: Lee Enterprises
- Editor: Gene Crider
- Founded: 1881
- Headquarters: 1010 Broughton St. Orangeburg, SC 29115; United States
- Circulation: 8,551 Daily (as of 2023)
- Website: thetandd.com

The Times and Democrat is a daily newspaper in Orangeburg, South Carolina. The Times and Democrat is owned by Lee Enterprises, a company based in Davenport, Iowa.

== History and origins ==
The Times and Democrat traces its history to the October 1881 merger of The Orangeburg Democrat and The Orangeburg Times. It also has ties to four other newspapers born in the aftermath of the American Civil War: The Southron, The Tax-Payer, The Edisto Clarion and The Orangeburg News and Times. Like most newspapers of the South during Reconstruction, the Orangeburg publications were embroiled in political doctrines. The Orangeburg News, for instance, was organized as a newspaper of the Democrats but later became a newspaper of the Republicans.

Into this milieu came James L. Sims. The Charleston, South Carolina, native learned the printing trade at The Charleston Courier and subsequently purchased an interest in The Spartanburg Herald. When his wife died, Sims sold his interest and moved to Orangeburg. In 1878, he purchased The Edisto Clarion, successor to The Tax-Payer, and changed its name again, to The Orangeburg Democrat. Sims' editor at the Democrat was Stiles R. Mellichamp, who after a short period left to start his own newspaper, The Orangeburg Times. In 1881, Sims and Mellichamp came together again to merge their newspapers into The Times and Democrat.

A close Orangeburg newspaper colleague of Sims in those early days was Hugo S. Sheridan. Some years later, Sims married Sheridan's daughter. From this marriage came four sons, three of whom were involved in the paper. James Izlar Sims, the oldest, dropped out of school at age 14 to work at The Times and Democrat.

The news content was a little different then. One of the biggest events of the year was the ginning of the first bale of cotton. Automobiles running into mules and cows usually received big coverage. Sports received little attention. Typesetting was done by hand, one letter at a time, until 1906, when The Times and Democrat purchased a new Ottmar Mergenthaler Linotype machine at a cost of $3,600. J. Izlar Sims, then 16 years old, was sent to New York City to learn how to operate the new machine that was destined to revolutionize the newspaper industry. Five years later, at the age of 21, he succeeded his father as publisher. J. Izlar Sims also founded a radio station and brought the first talking picture (movie theater) to Orangeburg, in the late 1920s. He was a volunteer firefighter and often drove the city's first fire truck. He died in 1957.

J.L. Sims' twin boys, Hugo and Henry Sims, shared the editorship of the newspaper until Henry was elected to the South Carolina State Senate in the 1930s and later became president of Winthrop College. Hugo Sims continued as editor until his death in 1951.

The youngest son, Gelzer Sims, graduated from the U.S. Naval Academy and achieved the rank of admiral during World War II.

Mellichamp and Sheridan became full-time educators. Today, Orangeburg elementary schools bear each of their names.

A weekly publication since its founding, The Times and Democrat began publishing twice a week in 1908, three times a week in 1909 and five times a week in September 1919. It returned to tri-weekly publication in May 1921 but later resumed daily publication. A Monday edition was added in the 1940s and the Sunday edition in 1953.

J.L. Sims succeeded his father as publisher in 1943. In 1951 Hugo Sims Sr. died and his son, Edward, succeeded him as editor. In the 1960s, Hugo Sims' other two sons, Hugo Jr. and Henry, served as co-editors. After J.L. Sims died in 1962 at age 47, surviving family members named Dean Livingston, 29, as publisher, a position he held until his retirement in 1999.

A century ago, The Times and Democrat was the first newspaper in town to buy a cylinder press. In 1965 The Times and Democrat became South Carolina's first daily newspaper to convert to offset printing. In 1989 The Times and Democrat became South Carolina's first daily newspaper to design its pages entirely with computers.

The Times and Democrat has continued to publish daily despite hurricanes, snowstorms and a 1972 fire that destroyed The Times and Democrat's entire physical plant. Within five days of that fire, new typesetting machines and other production equipment were flown in. Within 10 days, a new press had arrived, and within 30 days, the pressroom building had been rebuilt around it.

Howard Publications acquired total ownership of The Times and Democrat in 1981. Lee Enterprises acquired Howard Publications and subsequently The Times and Democrat in 2002.

Cathy Hughes became The Times and Democrat's fifth publisher in 1999. She retired in 2024. Lee Harter retired as editor also in 2014. The new editor is Gene Crider.

Starting June 6, 2023, the print edition of the newspaper was reduced to three days a week: Tuesday, Thursday and Saturday. Also, the newspaper transitioned from being delivered by a newspaper delivery carrier to mail delivery by the U.S. Postal Service.
