= 4 Children for Sale =

1948 photograph

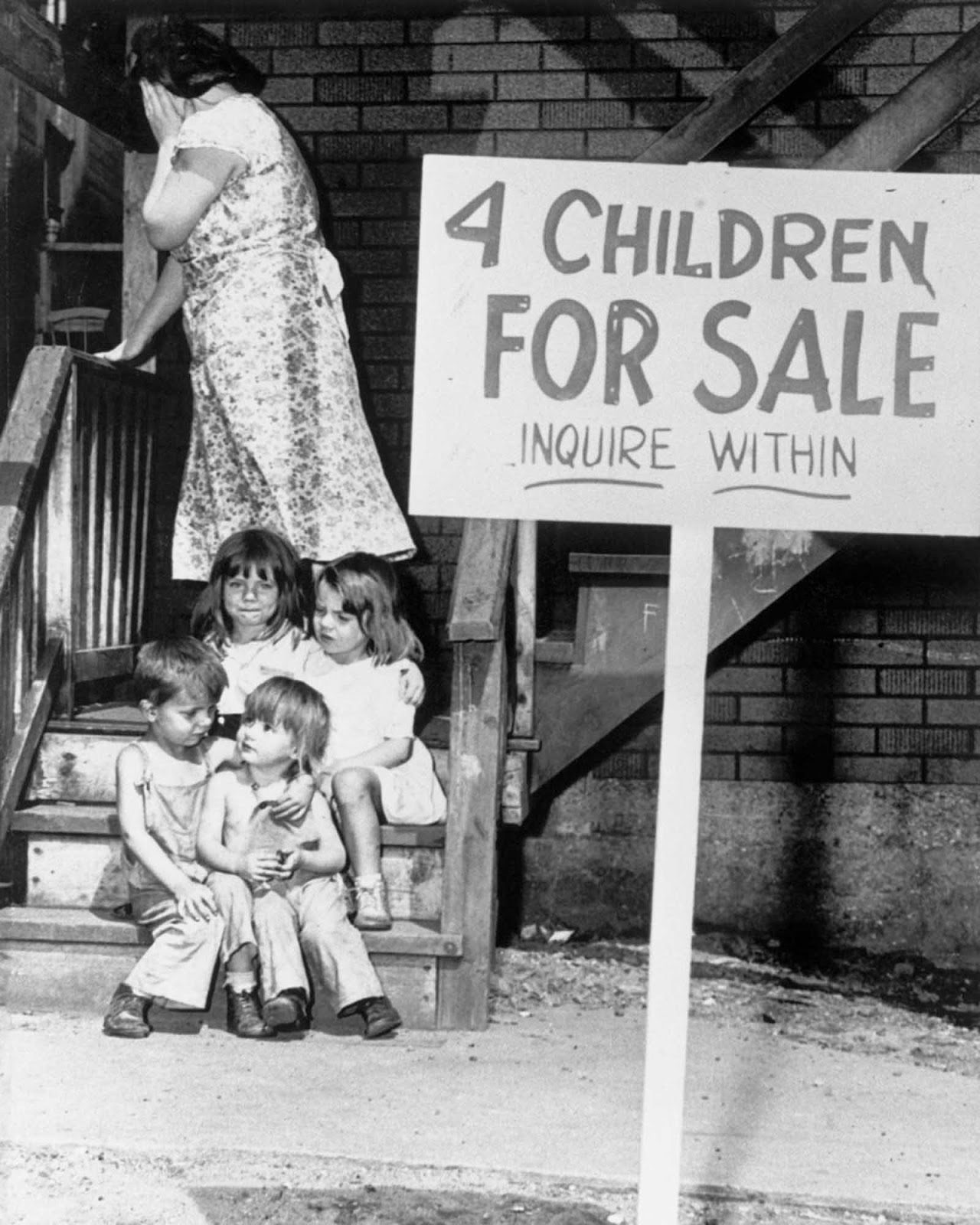
'4 Children for Sale' - original caption: "August 5, 1948 - Chicago, Illinois: A big 'For Sale' sign in a Chicago yard mutely tells the tragic story of Mr. and Mrs. Ray Chalifoux, who face eviction from their apartment. With no place to turn, the jobless coal truck driver and his wife decide to sell their four children. Mrs. Lucille Chalifoux turns her head from camera above while her children stare wonderingly. On the top step are Lana, 6, and Rae, 5. Below are Milton, 4, and Sue Ellen, 2."

4 Children for Sale is a photograph that depicts a mother, Lucille Chalifoux, hiding her head as her four children sit unwittingly beneath a sign that offers all of them for sale. The photo was first published by the Vidette-Messenger of Valparaiso, Indiana, on August 5, 1948, and was circulated widely during the following week.

== After the photo ==
While it has been speculated that the photo may have been staged, the story behind it was true. All of the children, including the child that Chalifoux was pregnant with at the time the photo was taken, were sold. One of the girls in the photo claimed that she was sold for $2 for bingo money, and others claimed to have been sold and chained to a barn to work as slave laborers on a farm.

Descendants of the children have sought to find their relatives.
