= James W. Huston (author) =

American author and lawyer

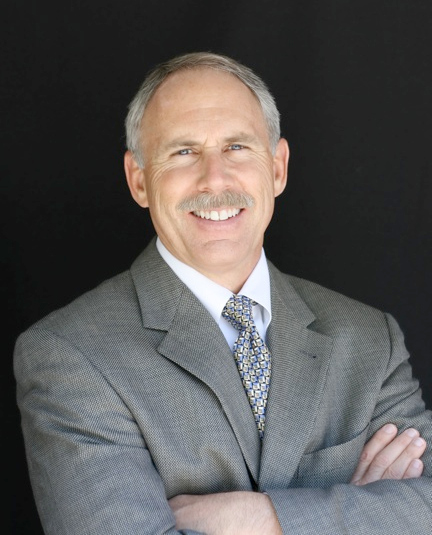
- Photo by Kristen Bons
- Born: James Webb Huston; October 26, 1953; West Lafayette, Indiana, U.S.
- Died: April 14, 2016 (aged 62); San Diego, California, U.S.
- Education: University of South Carolina (BA); University of Virginia
- Occupations: Novelist; lawyer
- Writing career
- Period: Modern
- Genres: Military fiction; techno-thriller; legal thriller
- Website: www.jameswhuston.com

James Webb Huston (October 26, 1953 – April 14, 2016) was an American author and lawyer, best known for his popular military and legal thrillers. A graduate of TOPGUN, he served as a naval flight officer and worked in naval intelligence before going on to become a New York Times best-selling author.

== Early life ==
Huston was born and grew up in West Lafayette, Indiana. His father, James A. Huston, was a Purdue University history professor and highly decorated World War II veteran who published several books on military and diplomatic history. In 2009, James A. Huston was awarded the French Legion of Honor, the highest civilian decoration in France. James W. graduated from high school in 1971, and attended the University of South Carolina on a Navy ROTC scholarship. Attending the program during the last years of the Vietnam War was tumultuous; anti-war protests on campus were frequent, and many were directed at the ROTC. During his senior year he completed an exchange cruise on a French Navy destroyer out of Brest, the EE Kersaint. He then studied English Reformation history and English literature at the University of Warwick in Coventry, England. He graduated from the University of South Carolina in 1975 with a BA in history and a minor in English. He was commissioned into the U.S. Navy as an Ensign on the day of his graduation.

== Naval career ==
After a year of flight training in Pensacola, Florida, and a year of F-14 Tomcat training at Naval Air Station Miramar, California, he became an F-14 Naval Flight Officer and was assigned to fighter squadron VF-84—nicknamed the Jolly Rogers—based in Virginia Beach, Virginia. The unit flew off of the USS Nimitz, one of the largest warships in the world and the first of the Nimitz class of nuclear-powered aircraft carriers. VF-84 participated in the making of The Final Countdown, a 1980 movie starring Kirk Douglas and Katharine Ross. Huston flew in many of the film's flight scenes, and directed others. He was selected to attend the elite Navy Fighter Weapons School, popularly known as TOPGUN, and graduated in 1978. After his tour with VF-84, Huston taught Seapower and Maritime Affairs at The Citadel, The Military College of South Carolina, from 1980 to 1981.

== Legal career ==
In 1981, Huston resigned from active duty in order to attend law school at the University of Virginia. After graduating in 1984, he moved to California to join San Diego–based law firm Gray Cary Ames & Frye, and began flying in the Navy Reserves out of NAS Miramar. After a few years, he transferred into the Naval Intelligence Reserves, where he remained—monitoring intelligence reports and briefing personnel when called upon—until retiring as a Commander in 1997. He was elevated to partner at Gray Cary Ames & Frye in 1990, and led the firm's tort and product liability practice group. Huston joined the international law firm Morrison & Foerster as a partner in May 2004. He was the chairman of the firm's trial practice group, and has been involved in numerous high-profile cases. On September 2, 2010, Huston was named one of the top ten product liability litigators in the country by the legal newswire Law 360.

== Inspiration for first novel ==
Writing op-eds for a local newspaper kick-started Huston's literary interests in the early 1990s. After two years of writing editorial pieces for the Escondido Times-Advocate and the San Diego Union-Tribune, he decided to try fiction. His first and second novels met with "hundreds" of rejection letters, and were never published. His third, Balance Of Power, combined Huston's military and legal expertise with political intrigue and was an instant success, with film rights sold to Jerry Bruckheimer and the Walt Disney Company. The book was based on an obscure clause in the U.S. Constitution that had captured Huston's imagination—Congress's power to issue Letters of Marque and Reprisal—and he had found his voice. Balance of Power set the tone for his subsequent novels, which feature politics, law and military action.

== Influences and writing habits ==
Huston's favorite author was Patrick O'Brian, who wrote the Aubrey–Maturin series of novels about the Royal Navy during the Napoleonic Wars. He also admired the works of Ernest Hemingway and Marilynne Robinson—Hemingway for his crisp prose and captivating stories, and Robinson for her use of language and depth. Huston started out writing for an hour or so each night after his children went to sleep. He completed his first two novels on a computer but has dictated the drafts of each novel since, using voice-recognition software to convert his words into text.

== Personal life ==
Huston was the father of five grown children and lived near San Diego with his wife of 36 years, Dianna. He had three grandchildren. Huston died on April 14, 2016, in San Diego after a long battle with multiple myeloma.

== Books ==
=== Fiction ===
- Balance of Power (1998).
- The Price of Power (1999)
- Flash Point (2000)
- Fallout (2001)
- Shadows of Power (2002)
- Secret Justice (2003)
- Marine One (2009)
- Falcon Seven (2010)
- Blood Flag (2015)

== Non-fiction ==
- 100 Questions & Answers About Myeloma (2005) (with Asad Bashey MD)

== Recurring characters ==
Jim Dillon, attorney and top congressional aide. He appears in Balance of Power and The Price of Power.

Lt. Kent "Rat" Rathman, versatile and legendary Navy SEAL. He was introduced in The Shadows of Power and reappears in Secret Justice.
