= The Blackbyrds =

American band

- Origin: Washington, D.C., United States
- Genres: Jazz fusion, jazz-funk, jazz, smooth jazz
- Years active: 1973–1981, 2012–present
- Label: Fantasy
- Members: Joe Hall; Keith Killgo; Orville Saunders
- Past members: Allan Barnes; Donald Byrd; Barney Perry; Kevin Toney; Jay Jones; Ray Armando; Oscar Brashear; Perk Jacobs; David Williams; Wesley Jackson; Stephen Johnson; Gary Hart

The Blackbyrds are an American rhythm and blues and jazz-funk fusion group, formed in Washington, D.C., in 1973 and reformed in 2012 by Keith Killgo.

== History ==
The group was inspired by trumpeter Donald Byrd and featured some of his Howard University students: Kevin Toney (keyboards), Keith Killgo (vocals, drums), Joe Hall (bass guitar), Allan Barnes (saxophone, clarinet), and Barney Perry (guitar). Orville Saunders (guitar), and Jay Jones (flute, saxophone) joined later. Merry Clayton joined them to sing on "Rock Creek Park" and "Happy Music".

The band signed with Fantasy Records in 1973. Their 1975 hit "Walking in Rhythm" received a Grammy nomination and sold over one million copies by May 1975. It was later awarded a gold disc. Subsequent albums City Life, Unfinished Business, and Action also reached Gold sales status.

Founding member Allan Barnes died on July 25, 2016, at the age of 66. Pianist Kevin Toney died from cancer on March 18, 2024, at the age of 70.

== Sampling of Blackbyrds music ==
The Blackbyrds' work has been sampled by hip-hop artists including Tupac Shakur, Gang Starr, Da Lench Mob, and Full Force. Their song "Happy Music" was issued on 45 rpm 12-inch single as the first club mix release by Fantasy Records, in November 1975, to enable club deejays to drop sequences into a mix. In particular, their 1975 song "Rock Creek Park" from the City Life album has been sampled by groups and artists such as MF Doom, De La Soul, Da Lench Mob, Eric B. & Rakim, Massive Attack, Heavy D, Nas, Grandmaster Flash & the Furious Five, Tone Lōc, Mac Dre, and Wiz Khalifa.

== Discography ==
=== Studio albums ===
Year	Album	Chart positions			Label	Certifications
Year	Album	US	US R&B	US Jazz	Label	Certifications
1974	The Blackbyrds	96	14	6	Fantasy	
1974	Flying Start	30	5	2	Fantasy	
1975	Cornbread, Earl and Me (soundtrack)	150	19	39	Fantasy	
1975	City Life	16	3	1	Fantasy	US: Gold (RIAA)
1976	Unfinished Business	34	6	5	Fantasy	US: Gold (RIAA)
1977	Action	43	8		Fantasy	US: Gold (RIAA)
1980	Better Days	133	40		Fantasy	—
2012	Gotta Fly	—	—	—		K-Wes Indi Records
"—" denotes releases that did not chart.

=== Compilations ===
- 1978: Night Grooves (Fantasy)
- 1989: Greatest Hits (Fantasy)
- 2007: Happy Music: The Best of The Blackbyrds (Fantasy FCD-30194-2)

=== Singles ===
Year	Title	Peak chart positions				
Year	Title	US	US R&B	US Disco	US A/C	UK
1974	"Do It, Fluid"	69	23	―	―	―
1974	"Gut Level"	―	―	9	―	―
1975	"Walking in Rhythm"	6	4	9	5	23
1975	"Future Children, Future Hopes"	―	―	3	―	―
1975	"Flyin' High"	70	22	―	―	―
1975	"City Life"	―	―	4	―	―
1976	"Happy Music"	19	3	6	―	―
1976	"Rock Creek Park"	93	37	―	―	―
1976	"Unfinished Business"	―	―	14	―	―
1976	"Time Is Movin'"	95	15	―	―	―
1976	"Party Land"	―	30	―	―	―
1977	"Soft and Easy"	―	20	―	―	―
1977	"Supernatural Feeling"	―	19	―	―	―
1977	"Street Games"	―	―	―	―	―
1980	"Don't Know What You Say"	―	―	―	―	―
1980	"What We Have Is Right"	―	38	―	―	―
1980	"Love Don't Strike Twice"	―	52	―	―	―
1980	"Dancin' Dancin'"	―	―	59	―	―
2002	"Mysterious Vibes" (remix, originally released in 1977)	―	—	―	―	97
"—" denotes releases that did not chart or were not released in that territory.
