= Walking in Rhythm =

Single by the Blackbyrds

from the album Flying Start
- B-side: "The Baby"; "Future Children, Future Hopes" (optional)
- Released: March 1975
- Recorded: September 1974
- Genre: Progressive soul
- Length: 4:11
- Label: Fantasy
- Songwriter: Barney Perry
- Producer: Donald Byrd

The Blackbyrds singles chronology
"Gut Level" (1974)	"Walking in Rhythm" (1975)	"Future Children, Future Hopes" (1975)

"Walking in Rhythm" is a song by American group the Blackbyrds. It tells the tale of a man who is passionate about getting back home to his female companion.

The song charted in March 1975 and reached number six on the US Billboard Hot 100 and number twenty three on the UK Singles Chart in June. The tune was similarly well accepted by soft rock stations, reaching the top ten on the Billboard Easy Listening chart as well as on the Canadian Adult Contemporary chart.

"Walking in Rhythm" was the greatest hit of the Blackbyrds' four-year chart career. It was recorded in September 1974 at The Sound Factory in Los Angeles, California, and appeared on the group's second album Flying Start.

== Perry v. Estates of Byrd ==
Songwriter Barney Perry sued producer Donald Byrd's estate in 2014 over royalties earned by the song, as well as those from his song "A Hot Day Today" on the previous album. He alleged that Byrd had breached his contract, and subsequently "entered into a 'criminal partnership' to fraudulently deprive him of his copyright ownership of and royalty payments for the musical compositions.' Perry also asserted that the Byrd Defendants had "committed unspecified torts against him, including stealing his van and obstructing his career, and...violated his civil rights to "rescind or cancel the settlement agreement in the event of fraud breach, injury or loss."

The case was dismissed and, because he had twice previously attempted to pursue cases relating to copyright infringement of his songs, was disallowed from initiating similar cases in the future.

== Chart performance ==
=== Weekly charts ===
Chart (1975)	Peak position
Australia	75
Canada RPM Adult Contemporary	4
Canada RPM Top Singles	14
New Zealand (RIANZ)	34
UK	23
US Billboard Hot 100	6
US Cash Box Top 100	7
US Adult Contemporary	5
US R&B	4

=== Year-end charts ===
Chart (1975)	Rank
Canada	125
US Billboard Hot 100	53
