= Edward H. Sims =

American author and World War II pilot (1923–2014)

Edward Howell Sims (May 29, 1923 – November 12, 2014) was an American author, wartime fighter pilot and newspaper figure. He is best known for his extensive chronicling of fighter missions and fighter tactics covering the period 1914 to 1970.

== Life and career ==
Sims was born and spent his early years in Orangeburg, South Carolina. When World War II began, he enlisted in the Army Air Force, and received his officer's commission and pilot wings. He flew 33 missions over Germany-occupied territories.

After the war Sims received a Bachelor of Arts degree from Wofford College in Spartanburg SC. He also studied journalism at Emory University in Atlanta (Georgia), while also working at the The Times and Democrat as the sports editor. He later served as associate editor, and then editor of the newspaper.

In 1947 Sims founded a Washington, D.C. bureau to represent several regional newspapers. He also became the DC correspondent for Editor's Copy Syndicate, a national news and feature service. In 1952 he became the editor and publisher of that service. During those years he contributed a weekly news column (beginning in 1948), and was regularly featured on a DC radio news broadcast (beginning in 1951).

Sims was married. They had one child, a daughter. After retiring from Washington, the family returned to Orangeburg. Sims died on November 12, 2014, at the age of 91.

== Published works ==
- American Aces in Great Fighter Battles of World War II (1958), Harper & Brothers, New York, Library of Congress Catalog No. 58-5752 (Descriptions of 12 USAAF fighter pilots and their most memorable missions)
- Greatest Fighter Missions of the Top Navy and Marine Aces of World War II (1962), Harper & Row, New York, Library of Congress Catalog No. 62-7921 (Descriptions of 11 USN or USMC pilots and their most memorable missions)
- The Greatest Aces (1967) (Descriptions of World War II fighter aces from the US, England, and Germany)
- Fighter Exploits - A Study of Air Combat from World War I to Vietnam (1973)
- The Aces Talk (January 1974)
- Aces Over the Oceans - the Great Pilots of World War II (April 1987)
