= Jim Toomey =

American comic strip cartoonist

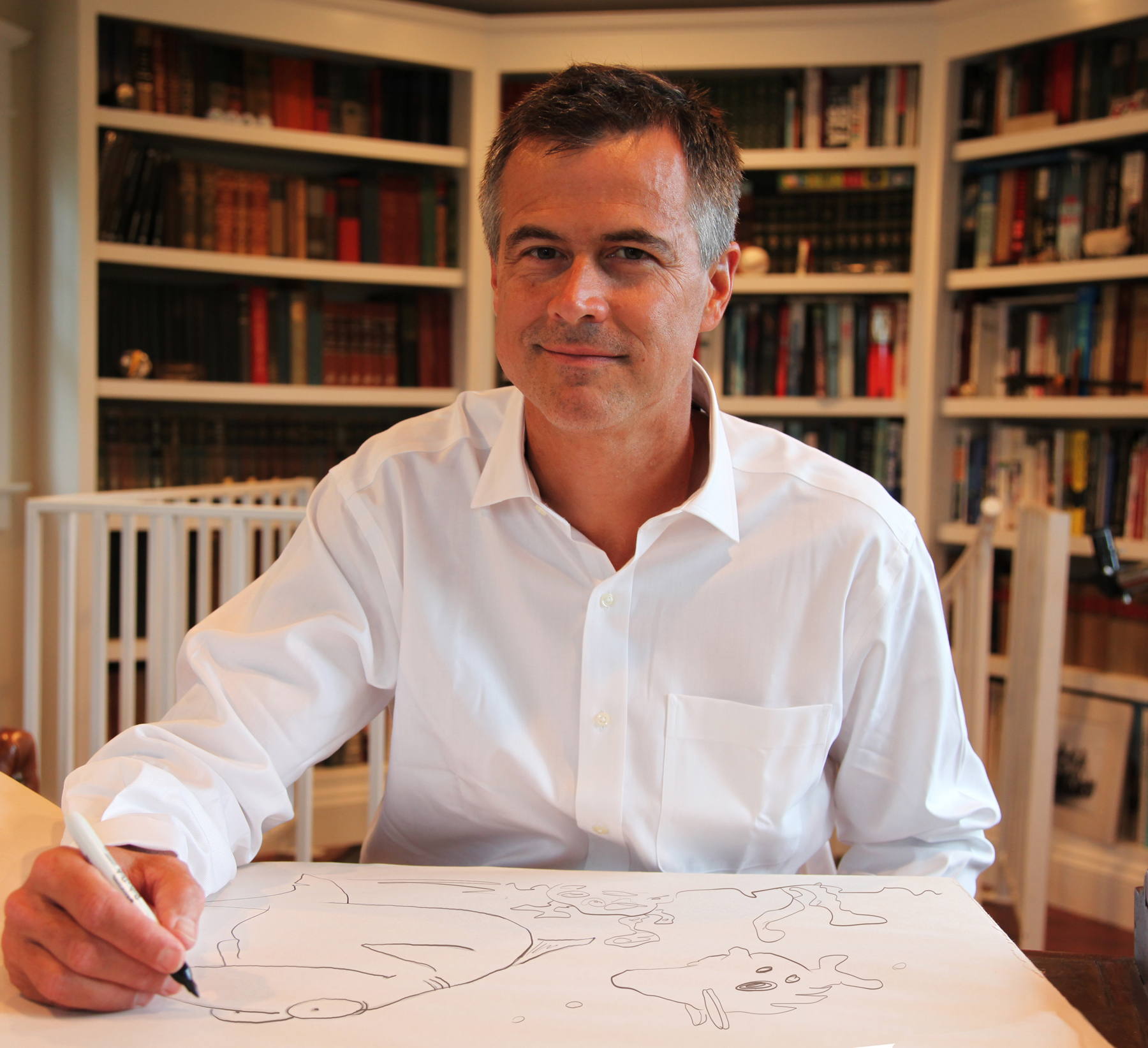
- Jim Toomey in his studio
- Born: James Patrick Toomey; December 26, 1960 (age 65)
- Occupation: Cartoonist
- Years active: 1991– present
- Notable work: Sherman's Lagoon
- Spouse: Valerie Toomey
- Children: Madeleine Kelly Toomey; John William Toomey

Toomey and National Oceanic and Atmospheric Administration (NOAA) Administrator Jane Lubchenco unveil the poster he designed for NOAA's Marine Protected Areas Center in 2009.

James Patrick Toomey is an American cartoonist, creator of Sherman's Lagoon. The comic strip appears in over 150 newspapers in North America, including the Washington Post, the Seattle Times, and the Denver Post. The comic strip also appears in over 20 foreign countries and six languages. Toomey has produced 30 Sherman’s Lagoon books, published by Andrews McMeel, and most recently a travel memoir, entitled Family Afloat, about his two years sailing the world’s oceans with his wife and family.

In addition to drawing his comic strip, Toomey is active in ocean conservation and serves on several nonprofit boards, including the Smithsonian Environmental Research Center. The conservation message in his comic strip earned him the Environmental Hero Award in 2000, presented by the National Oceanic and Atmospheric Administration “for using art and humor to conserve and protect our marine heritage.” Toomey won the award again in 2010. In 2016, Toomey partnered with NOAA to create special award called the Silver Sherman, inspired by a similar award at NASA, the Silver Snoopy, based on Charles Schulz's comic strip Peanuts. Over the years, the Silver Sherman has been awarded by NOAA to individuals who have performed work above the normal requirements, achieved a milestone that contributed significantly toward the attainment of a particular program goal, or demonstrated immense leadership toward process improvement. In 2024, the Loggerhead Marinelife Center, in Juno Beach, FL, presented Toomey with the Eleanor Fletcher Lifetime Achievement Award for his work in communicating sea turtle conservation through media. His comic characters appear in educational materials and videos published by NOAA, the United Nations Environment Programme, Pew Charitable Trusts, and a variety of nonprofit organizations for the purpose of raising awareness of the oceans.

Toomey has done two TED Talks, the first in April, 2010 at an ocean-themed TED event in the Galapagos Islands, and the second in 2016 in Cannes, France. He has given similar talks at a variety of venues, from the Royal Society in London to Harvard University to the Monterey Bay Aquarium to his children’s kindergarten class. In 2008, Sherman’s Lagoon was made into a high school musical, which premiered at the Bentley School in Lafayette, CA.

Toomey earned a bachelor of science in mechanical engineering from Duke University in 1983. In 1995, he earned a Master of Arts from Stanford University, and in 2005 he returned to Duke to earn a Masters of Environmental Management.

== Creative works ==
- Attack of the Jumbo Shrimp - Oct. 2026
- A Giant Squid Walks Into a Bar... - Oct. 2025
- You Got In! Now What? - 2025 (illustrator; written by James Hamilton)
- Crabbily Ever After - Oct. 2024
- Things Are Looking Up - Oct. 2023
- You Need This Book Like a Fish Needs a Bicycle - Oct. 2022
- Family Afloat: Sailing the World with Two Kids and Two Captains - Jun. 2022
- Adventures in Aquaculture - Oct. 2021
- Evolution Is Hard Work! - Oct. 2020
- If You Can't Beat 'Em, Eat 'Em - Oct. 2019
- The Adventures of Superfish & His Superfishal Friends - Oct. 2018
- Onward and Downward - Oct. 2017
- Happy as a Clam - Oct. 2016
- Tales from the Deep - Oct. 2015
- Lunch Wore a Speedo - Oct. 2014
- Here We Go Again - Oct. 2013
- Think Like a Shark - Sep. 2012
- Never Bite Anything That Bites Back - Sep. 2011
- Discover Your Inner Hermit Crab - Sep. 2010
- Confessions of a Swinging Single Sea Turtle - Sep. 2009
- Sharks Just Wanna Have Fun - Sep. 2008
- Yarns and Shanties - Sep. 2007
- Planet of the Hairless Beach Apes - Sep. 2006
- In Shark Years I'm Dead - March 2006
- 50 Ways to Save the Ocean - 2006 (illustrator; written by David Helvarg)
- A Day at the Beach - March 2005
- Surfer Safari - Sep. 2005
- Catch of the Day - Sep. 2004
- Shark Diaries - Sep. 2003
- A Lagoa de Sherman - Sep. 2003 (Spanish)
- Le Lagon de Sherman - Sep. 2003 (French)
- Greatest Hits & Near Misses - Sep. 2002
- Surf's Up - March 2003
- Greetings From Sherman's Lagoon - Sep 2002
- Another Day in Paradise - Sep 2001
- An Illustrated Guide to Shark Etiquette - Sep 2000
- Poodle: The Other White Meat - Sep 1999
- Ate That, What's Next? - Sep. 1997
- Lagunen - Sep. 1996 (Norwegian)
- Sigges Lagun - Sep. 1994 (Swedish)
