= Valley Roadrunner =

- Type: Weekly newspaper
- Format: Broadsheet
- Owner(s): Roadrunner Publications, Inc.
- Founder(s): Derek Van Quackenbush
- Publisher: Justin Salter
- Editor: David Ross
- Founded: 1974
- Headquarters: 29115 Valley Center Rd., Ste. L Valley Center, California
- Circulation: 3,000 (as of 2021)
- OCLC number: 43080311
- Website: valleycenter.com

The Valley Roadrunner is a weekly print newspaper published in Valley Center, California serving Valley Center, Palomar Mountain, Pauma Valley, Pala, and North Escondido, California. It was founded in 1974.

== History ==
The newspaper was founded in 1974 by Derek "Van" Quackenbush (1921–2015), a journalism graduate of the University of Missouri who had founded and owned several local newspapers in Minnesota and Illinois prior to settling in San Diego County. According to one of its long-time editors, David Ross, the Roadrunner name was suggested by Quackenbush's father who had seen "something running around" and the floor of his canning factory. Van Quakenbush sold the paper to Dale and Shirley Good in 1992 who ran it for the next 20 years.

In 2012, the Valley Roadrunner was bought by Eric Buskirk whose company Verican produced software for newspapers and also owned The Henderson Press in Nevada and The Valley Chronicle in Hemet, California. According to Buskirk, the paper was near folding at the time he purchased it with a 50% fall in its revenues from its heyday. Buskirk began cutting the workforce and outsourcing some of the paper's production to China. These developments led to the resignation in 2013 of Ross, the paper's principle editor, who had written most of the paper's articles for the previous 25 years.

In September 2015, the paper was purchased by Justin Salter, and Ross returned to its editorship. Ross celebrated 40 years of working at the Valley Roadrunner in May 2024.

== Awards ==
In 2008, the paper's journalists won 7 San Diego Press Club awards in the "Humour", "Breaking news", "Best news website", and "Commentary" categories for non-daily papers. The paper's other local journalism awards include:

- 2008 San Diego Society of Professional Journalists James Julian Memorial Prize for Patsy Fritz's fire coverage.
- 2007 San Diego Society of Professional Journalists Awards in the "Investigative/Enterprise story" and "Opinion/Editorial" categories
- 2006 San Diego Society of Professional Journalists Herbert Lockwood "Woody" Award for humorous writing.
