= Oceanside Blade-Tribune =

Newspaper published in Oceanside, California

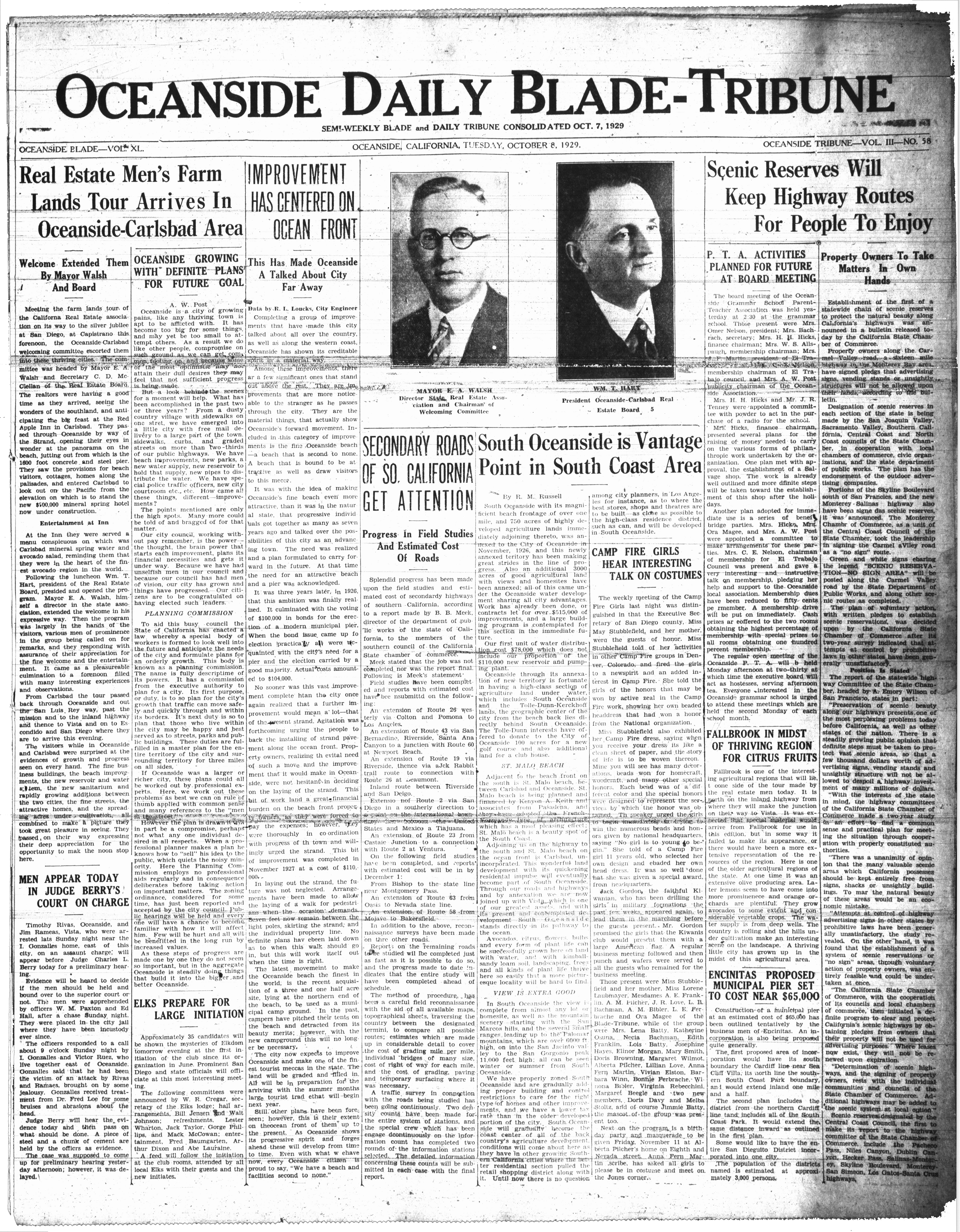
- Front page of the Oct. 8, 1929, edition.
- Type: Daily newspaper
- Founder: Henry Talbot Martin
- Founded: 1887 (as the San Marcos Herald)
- Ceased publication: 2013 (as North County Times)
- Language: English
- Headquarters: Oceanside, California

The Oceanside Blade-Tribune was a daily newspaper published in Oceanside, California. The paper originated in 1887 and charged ownership and names over decades until finally ceasing in 2013.

== History ==
In December 1887, Henry Talbot Martin founded the weekly San Marcos Herald in San Marcos, California. The press was ordered a few months earlier from Chicago. In April 1888, J. Chauncey Hayes founded the South Oceanside Diamond in Oceanside, California. In January 1889, Martin moved his press to Oceanside and relaunched his paper as the Oceanside Herald. In December 1888, Martin died. In September 1888, Hayes sold the Diamond to Horace Greeley McPhee, who moved it to Perris, California.

In November 1891, the Herald, now managed by the founder's son, James Merritt Martin, acquired and absorbed the Diamond. In August 1892, A. Bert Bynon founded the Oceanside Blade. Later that month, Bynon acquired and absorbed the Herald. In January 1893, George A. Reynolds retired from the Blade, leaving Bynon as sole manager. In March 1893, Bynon left to go start another paper in Santa Clara County, leaving the paper to E.D. McGaw.

In March 1897, McGaw was arrested for criminal libel, but the case was dismissed. In September 1897, Melvin S. Remsburgh bought the Blade from McGaw. He was soon joined by Wilbur S. Spencer, who, in January 1899, became the paper's sole owner. In October 1923, C.G. Campbell sold the Oceanside News, a local weekly, to James P. Welch.

In May 1927, brothers Mark and Joe Bryan founded the Oceanside Daily Tribune, a daily newspaper publishing six days a week. In August 1927, George K. Stafford acquired a half-interest in the Tribune, and the Bryan brothers left town that December. In January 1929, the Tribune fell into the hands of his father-in-law, F.B. Van Fleet, who named J.H. Howell as editor. That April, Stafford left town. In August 1929, Van Fleet sold the paper to Fred W. Mitchell.

In October 1929, J.M. Beck, of Centerville, Iowa, bought the daily Tribune from Mitchell and the semi-weekly Blade from Spencer and merged the two to form the Oceanside Blade-Tribune. His brother-in-law J.R. Needham was a business partner and his two sons, Harold N. Beck and Paul R Beck, were also involved in the business. In May 1933, former Blade publisher Spencer died at age 60. He dropped dead while judging a bicycle race on the beach during a Memorial Day celebration. Heart disease was the cause of death.

In July 1934, News publisher Welch died at age 60. In May 1935, his widow Mary Welch sold the News to Ralph Molm. She reacquired the paper a month later. In February 1936, brothers D.L. and H.L. Willis purchased the News. In August 1936, the Beck brothers acquired News from the Willis brothers. That November, a new printing plant was constructed for the Blade-Tribune and News.

In June 1937, Charles N. Burger founded the San Clemente Sun in San Clemente, California, after selling his half-interest in the Fallbrook Enterprise. In January 1938, the Beck brothers acquired the Sun. In July 1939, Jack Brerton founded the San Dieguito Citizen in Rancho Santa Fe. In September 1940, Merton W. Hackett acquired the Sun.

In 1946, Noel P. Lapham bought the Citizen. In August 1954, Thomas W. Braden bought the Blade-Tribune from Paul and Harold Beck. In October 1961, Grace Allison Lapham, wife of Citizen publisher Noel P. Lapham, died at age 60. In March 1967, Howard Publications acquired the Blade-Tribune.

In August 1974, Citizen publisher Noel P. Lapham died at age 77. In May 1979, Howard purchased the Citizen from Don C. Lapham. At that time the Blade-Tribune had a circulation of 28,000. In June 1989, the Blade-Tribune, San Dieguito Citizen, Del Mar Citizen and La Costan were merged to form the North County Blade-Citizen. In July 1995, Howard acquired the Escondido Times-Advocate from the Tribune Company. That December, the Times-Advocate and Blade-Citizen were merged to form the North County Times. In October 2012, Doug Manchester bought the Times for $11.95 million. In May 2013, the Times fully ceased after fully merging into the U-T San Diego.
