= Vidette Times =

Newspaper

The Vidette Times is a local newspaper in Porter County, Indiana. It began in 1842 as an occasional, the Republican. In 1866 it came under new ownership as The Porter County Vidette. In 1871, a rival, The Valparaiso Democratic Messenger emerged. In the 1920s, The Vidette and The Messenger merged to form The Vidette-Messenger. In 1994, Howard Publications purchased The Vidette-Messenger, renamed it The Vidette Times in 1995, and attempted unsuccessfully to give it more regional content, but eventually returned it to a local focus.

== See also ==
- 4 Children for Sale
