= Allan Barnes =

American musician

Allan C. Barnes
- Born: September 27, 1949; Detroit, Michigan, U.S.
- Died: July 25, 2016 (aged 66) Detroit, Michigan, U.S.
- Genres: Jazz, rhythm and blues, funk
- Instruments: Saxophone, flute, clarinet
- Formerly of: The Blackbyrds

Allan Curtis Barnes (September 27, 1949 – July 25, 2016) was an American jazz musician, based in Detroit for the majority of his career.

== Early life ==
Barnes was born in Detroit, Michigan, on September 27, 1949. He received his first musical training from his musician uncles, Joe and Robert Barnes. In 1967, Barnes enlisted in the United States Army and trained at the Army Element of the U.S. Naval School of Music. After a year in the 437th, he was deployed to South Vietnam and the 4th Division Army Band.

== Musical career ==
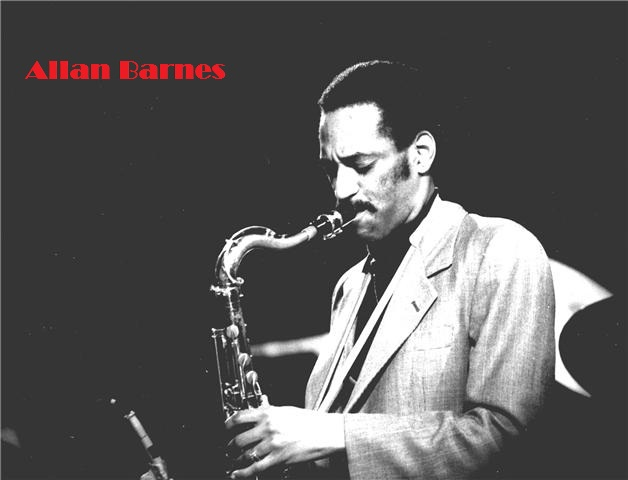
Allan C. Barnes, circa 1981. Photo by Leni Sinclair

After being discharged, Barnes played his way back to Detroit. He was discovered by trumpeter Donald Byrd who insisted that Barnes come to Howard University and play with a new band he was putting together, the Blackbyrds. Barnes traveled the world with Donald Byrd and the Blackbyrds. The band's first album went gold with Barnes writing two of the songs: "Summer Love" and "The Blackbyrds Theme". The band's second album, Flying Start, contained the hit single "Walking in Rhythm", with Barnes being featured on flute.

Barnes formed his own band, Allan Barnes and Primetime. He played and recorded with numerous artists, including Gil Scott-Heron, Lyman Woodard David II, Fred Wesley, Nina Simone, Lee Oscar, Pini Cohen, Bennie Maupin, Siggy Dillard, Delbert Taylor, Robert Guillaume, Wilson Pickett, Christian DiMaggio, Lakeside, Ceri Lucas, Prince, the Mizell Brothers, Marcus Belgrave, Harold McKinney, Bootsy Collins, the Detroit Experiment, Regina Carter, Geri Allen, the Dramatics, the Interzone Orchestra, Reggie Braxton, Sandy Patton, Dwight Adams, Sunny Wilkinson, Sunny Girl, Martha Reeves, Mary Wilson, Teddy Harris, Roy Brooks, Big John Patton, Milt Hinton, Grant Green, Pharoah Sanders, Sonny Rollins and Billy Taylor.

During his career Barnes wrote music with John Malone and had a single, "Disco Dancin'", on the first Taste of Honey album and with R. Kelly co-wrote the single "Money Makes the World Go Round". He has written music for commercials with Larry King, Brenda Sykes, Sugar Ray Leonard, Leslie Nielsen, and Muhammad Ali. He penned the music for the PBS movie One Night's Run and the PBS series Small Business Magazine. In addition he wrote station identification theme for the University of Michigan public television station. Barnes created and hosted the PBS show Jazzland. He also had a cameo in the Clint Eastwood film Bird (1988).

== Later projects ==
Barnes wrote "Until We Meet Again", a classic jazz piece. He was seen in the feature role in the PBS special American Jazz Greats: Evolution of the Jazz Saxophone. Barnes led the band Giant Steps, which consists of six band leaders: Cliff Monear, Marion Hayden, Rayse Biggs, Sunny Wilkinson, and Gayelynn McKinney. His sound was described as "calling out to the audience and inviting them in with his masterful improvisation, supreme musicianship and his significant contributions to the preservation of the history of jazz".

Barnes was employed by several modern Detroit artists in the Detroit hip-hop scene including Finale, Big Tone, and Stryfe, for all of whom he performed in the studio. Barnes was a frequent collaborator of the Detroit hip-hop/funk fusion band Gorilla Funk Mob, from 2007. Barnes is featured on Rebirth of Detroit (2012), along with a wide array of Detroit hip-hop artists, all performing over beats from legendary producer J Dilla.

== Death ==
Barnes died on July 25, 2016, in Detroit after suffering a heart attack.

== Discography ==
Album	Song	Label	Year
Do It Fluid/Summer Love	"Summer Love"	Fantasy	1974
Flying Start	"Blackbyrds' Theme/April Showers"	Fantasy	1974
The Blackbyrds	"Summer Love"	BGP Records	1974
A Taste of Honey	"Disco Dancin'"	Capitol Records	1978
Boogie Oogie Oogie/Disco Dancin'	"Disco Dancin'"	Capitol Records	1978
Night Grooves	"Gut Level/Walkin' in Rhythm"	Fantasy Records	1978
It's Cold Out Here		Jungle Records	1989
Jazz Dance Classics, Vol. 2	"The Runaway"	Luv N' Haight	1993
Hip City	"Moonstruck"	Luv N' Haight	1994
The Blackbyrds/Flying Start		BGP Records	1994
The Blackbyrds		Fantasy	1996
Beauty in the Boogie	"Disco Dancin'"	EMI Records	1997
Fresh Outta "P" University		WEA	1997
As Time Goes By		Virgin Records America	1999
Programmed	"People Make the World Go Round"	Talkin' Loud	1999
The Detroit Experiment	"Think Twice, Revelation"	Ropeadope Records	2002
Movement - Detroit's Electronic Music Festival 04		Transmat	2004
Funky Grooves	"Disco Dancin'"	Disky	2006
Happy Music: The Best of the Blackbyrds	"Blackbyrd's Theme"	Fantasy	2007
Lovebyrds: Soft and Easy	"April Showers, Summer Lovin'"	Fantasy	2007
A Pipe Dream and a Promise (CD)	"A Pipe Dream and a Promise"	Interdependent Media	2009
Time Has Come/Blackbyrds' Theme (7")	"Blackbyrds' Theme"	BackFire Records	2009
