= Kevin Toney =

American jazz pianist and composer (1953–2024)

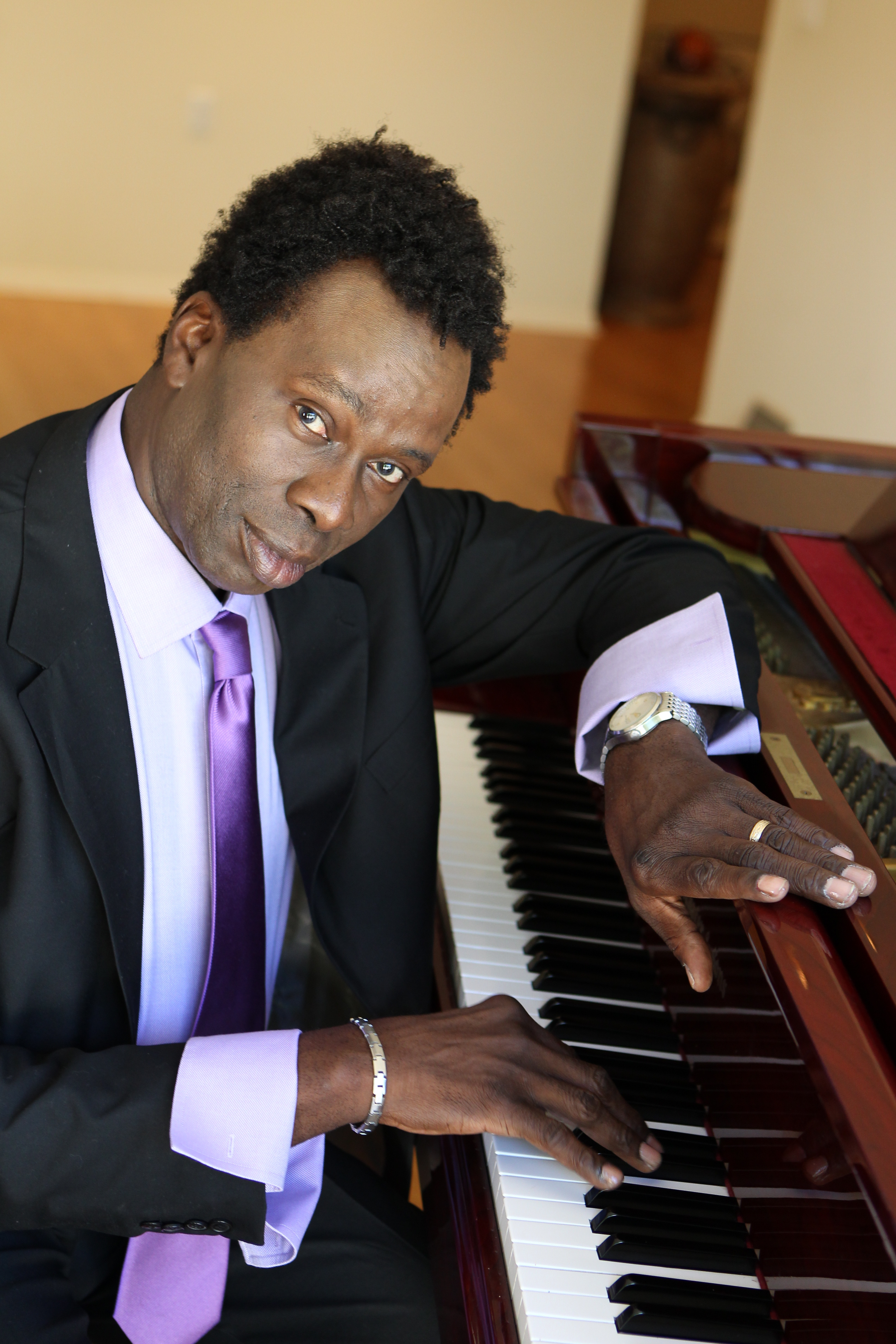
Image of Kevin Toney

Kevin Kraig Toney (April 23, 1953 – March 18, 2024) was an American jazz pianist and composer who was a member of The Blackbyrds.

== Biography ==
A native of Detroit, he graduated from Cass Technical High School. In his teens he listened to the music of John Coltrane and Art Tatum. He attended Howard University where Donald Byrd, head of the jazz studies department, assembled a group of students which became the fusion band the Blackbyrds, led by Toney. The band played with Chick Corea, The Crusaders, Herbie Hancock, and Grover Washington Jr. Seven albums by the band were released. Three were certified gold. The band's hits included "Rock Creek Park" and "Unfinished Business", both written by Toney. The latter received a Grammy Award nomination.

Toney recorded several albums as a solo musician. His album Strut was selected as "official music" by the Winter Olympic Committee of 2002. He performed at the Playboy Jazz Festival and at festivals in Denver, Long Beach, and Pasadena. He has worked as an arranger and conductor with, Patti Austin, Babyface, Gloria Gaynor, Edwin Hawkins, James Ingram, Enrique Iglesias, Michael McDonald, Brian McKnight, Freda Payne, Bill Withers, Stevie Wonder, Marilyn McCoo, and Billy Davis Jr. In the same roles he worked in theater for Ain't Misbehavin' , Five Guys Named Moe, Harlem Suite, The Magic of Motown, Sophisticated Ladies, and Wild Women Blues. He wrote the music for the film Kings of the Evening.

His first solo piano album, A Grateful Heart, was released in 2012. In 2014, he produced the first album by his daughter, Dominique Toney. Other musicians he has worked with include Kenny Burrell, Shirley Caesar, Ray Charles, Aretha Franklin, Isaac Hayes, Whitney Houston, Nolan Shaheed, Hubert Laws, David "Fathead" Newman, James Newton, Ray Parker Jr., Sonny Rollins, Frank Sinatra, Sonny Stitt, Shania Twain, Gerald Wilson, Nancy Wilson, and Bobby Womack.

Toney died from cancer on March 18, 2024, at the age of 70.

== Discography ==
=== As leader ===
- Special K (Fantasy, 1982)
- Lovescape (Ichiban, 1993)
- Pastel Mood (Ichiban, 1995)
- Extra Sensual Perception (Shanachie, 1999)
- Strut (Shanachie, 2001)
- Smooth Jazz Love Songs (Ichiban, 2001)
- Sweet Spot (Shanachie, 2003)
- 110 Degrees and Rising (Shanachie, 2005)
- A Heart of Gratitude a.k.a. A Grateful Heart (K-tone, 2008)
- New American Suite (K-tone, 2012)
- Kings of the Evening (K-tone, 2012)

With the Blackbyrds

- Blackbyrds (Fantasy, 1973)
- Flying Start (Fantasy, 1974)
- Cornbread, Earl and Me (Fantasy, 1975)
- City Life (Fantasy, 1976)
- Unfinished Business (Fantasy, 1977)
- Action (Fantasy, 1978)
- Better Days (Fantasy, 1981)
- Happy Music (Concord, 2007)
- Lovebyrds (Concord, 2007)

=== As sideman or guest ===
- Bobbi Humphrey Live: Cookin' with Blue Note at Montreux, Bobbi Humphrey (Blue Note, 1973)
- Live at Montreux, Alphonse Mouzon (Blue Note, 1973)
- Live at Montreux, Marlena Shaw (Blue Note, 1973)
- Collage, Andrew White (Andrew's Music, 1975)
- Places and Spaces, Donald Byrd (Blue Note, 1976)
- Caricatures, Donald Byrd (Blue Note, 1977)
- "You Make Me Feel (Mighty Real)", Sylvester (Honey/Fantasy, 1979)
- Scratch My Back, David "Fathead" Newman (Prestige, 1979)
- Sharon Redd, Sharon Redd (1980)
- You Can Call It What You Want, Bill Summers and Summers Heat (MCA, 1981)
- We Call It the Box, Bill Summers and Summers Heat (MCA, 1983)
- Soul Jazz, Michael Davis (1986)
- After Midnight, Ray Parker Jr. (Arista, 1987)
- Piano in the Dark, Brenda Russell (A & M, 1987)
- Midnite Blue, Phil Upchurch (KICJ [import],1991)
- Joyful Noise, Chester Thompson (Rhino, 1992)
- Get the Feeling, Two Tons: Martha Wash/Izora Rhodes Armstead (Fantasy, 1993)
- Life Changes, Doc Powell (Sampson, 2001)
- I'm Free, Ray Parker Jr. (Raydio, 2006)

== Awards and honors ==
- Grammy Award nomination, Best R&B Song, "Walking in Rhythm", with The Blackbyrds, 1976
- Grammy Award nomination, Best Instrumental Song, "Unfinished Business", with The Blackbyrds, 1978
- Billboard magazine Award No. 1 Pop Instrumental Group, with The Blackbyrds, 1976
- NAACP Image Award, Best Jazz Group, with The Blackbyrds, 1977
- Keys to the City Award – Detroit, New Orleans, Los Angeles
