= The Dells discography =

This is the discography documenting albums and singles released by American R&B/soul vocal group The Dells.

== Albums ==
=== Studio albums ===
Year	Album	Peak chart positions			Record label
Year	Album	US	US R&B	CAN	Record label
1959	Oh, What a Nite	—	—	—	Vee Jay
1965	It's Not Unusual	—	—	—	Vee Jay
1968	There Is	29	4	—	Cadet
1969	Musical Menu	146	9	—	Cadet
1969	Love Is Blue	54	3	45	Cadet
1970	Like It Is Like It Was	126	7	—	Cadet
1971	Freedom Means....	81	4	—	Cadet
1972	The Dells Sing Dionne Warwicke's Greatest Hits	162	32	—	Cadet
1972	Sweet as Funk Can Be	—	33	—	Cadet
1973	Give Your Baby a Standing Ovation	99	10	—	Cadet
1974	The Dells	—	15	—	Cadet
1974	The Dells vs. The Dramatics	156	15	—	Cadet
1974	The Mighty Mighty Dells	114	13	—	Cadet
1975	We Got to Get Our Thing Together	—	31	—	Cadet
1976	No Way Back	—	47	—	Mercury
1977	They Said It Couldn't Be Done, But We Did It!	—	40	—	Mercury
1978	Love Connection	—	45	—	Mercury
1978	New Beginnings	169	55	—	ABC
1979	Face to Face	—	71	—	ABC
1980	I Touched a Dream	137	23	—	20th Century Fox
1981	Whatever Turns You On	—	—	—	20th Century Fox
1984	One Step Closer	—	49	—	Private I
1988	The Second Time ^{[A]}	—	92	—	Veteran
1992	I Salute You	—	80	—	Philadelphia Int'l
2000	Reminiscing	—	—	—	Volt
"—" denotes a recording that did not chart or was not released in that territory.

- ^{A} The Second Time was re-released by Urgent! Records on June 13, 1991.

=== Compilation albums ===
Year	Album	Peak chart positions		Record label
Year	Album	US	US R&B	Record label
1969	Greatest Hits	102	9	Cadet
1975	Greatest Hits, Vol. 2	—	47	Cadet
1982	The Dells	—	—	Chess
1984	Breezy Ballads & Tender Tunes	—	—	Solid Smoke
1992	On Their Corner: The Best of the Dells	—	—	Chess
1993	Dreams of Contentment	—	—	Vee-Jay
1994	Oh, What a Night	—	—	MCA
1995	Passionate Breezes: The Best of the Dells 1975-1991	—	—	Mercury
1996	Bring Back the Love: Classic Dells Soul	—	—	Chess
1998	Oh What a Night! The Great Ballads	—	—	MCA
1999	Anthology	—	—	Hip-O
2000	The Millennium Collection: The Best of the Dells	—	—	Chess
2001	The Best of the Dells	—	—	PolyGram
2004	Ultimate Collection	—	—	Hip-O
2007	Standing Ovation: The Very Best of the Dells	—	—	Chess
2007	The Best of the Vee-Jay Years	—	—	Shout! Factory
"—" denotes a recording that did not chart or was not released in that territory.

== Singles ==
Year	Single (A-side, B-side) Both sides from same album except where indicated	Peak chart positions					Album
Year	Single (A-side, B-side) Both sides from same album except where indicated	US	US R&B	CAN	NLD	UK	Album
1955	"Tell the World"; B-side by Count Morris: "Blues at Three"	—	—	—	—	—	Non-album tracks
1955	"Zing, Zing, Zing" b/w "Dreams of Contentment"	—	—	—	—	—	Oh, What a Nite
1956	"Oh What a Nite" (Original version) b/w "Jo-Jo"	—	4	—	—	—	Oh, What a Nite
1956	"Movin' On" b/w "I Wanna Go Home"	—	—	—	—	—	Oh, What a Nite
1957	"Why Do You Have To Go" b/w "Dance Dance Dance"	—	—	—	—	—	Oh, What a Nite
1957	"A Distant Love" b/w "Q-Bop She-Bop"	—	—	—	—	—	Non-album tracks
1957	"Pain in My Heart" b/w "Time Makes You Change"	—	—	—	—	—	Oh, What A Nite
1958	"What You Say Baby" b/w "The Springer"	—	—	—	—	—	Non-album tracks
1958	"My Best Girl" b/w "Wedding Day"	—	—	—	—	—	Non-album tracks
1959	"Baby, Open Up Your Heart" b/w "Dry Your Eyes"	—	—	—	—	—	Oh, What a Nite
1960	"Oh What a Nite" b/w "I Wanna Go Home"; Reissue of original version with different B-side	—	—	—	—	—	Oh, What a Nite
1961	"Swingin' Teens" b/w "Hold On to What You've Got"	—	—	—	—	—	Non-album tracks
1962	"God Bless the Child" b/w "I'm Going Home"	—	—	—	—	—	Non-album tracks
1962	"(Bossa Nova) Bird" b/w "Eternally"	97	—	—	—	—	Non-album tracks
1963	"If It Ain't One Thing, It's Another" b/w "Hi Diddley Dee Dum Dum"	—	—	—	—	—	Greatest Hits Volume 2
1963	"Goodbye Mary Anne" b/w "After You" (Non-album track)	—	—	—	—	—	The Dells Musical Menu/Always Together
1964	"Shy Girl" b/w "What Do We Prove" (from It's Not Unusual)	—	—	—	—	—	Non-album tracks
1964	"Oh, What a Good Nite" b/w "Wait Till Tomorrow"	—	—	—	—	—	Non-album tracks
1965	"Stay in My Corner" (Original version) b/w "It's Not Unusual"	122	23	—	—	—	It's Not Unusual
1965	"Hey Sugar (Don't Get Serious)" b/w "Poor Little Boy"	—	—	—	—	—	Non-album tracks
1966	"Thinkin' About You" b/w "The Change We Go Thru (For Love)" (from There Is)	—	—	—	—	—	Non-album tracks
1966	"Run for Cover" b/w "Over Again" (Non-album track)	—	—	—	—	—	There Is
1967	"Inspiration" b/w "You Belong to Someone Else"	—	—	—	—	—	Non-album tracks
1967	"O-O, I Love You"; Original B-side: "There Is"; Later B-side: "The Change We Go Thru (For Love)"	61	22	56	—	—	There Is
1968	"There Is" b/w "Show Me"	20	11	30	—	—	There Is
1968	"Wear It on Our Face" b/w "Please Don't Change Me Now"	44	27	28	—	—	There Is
1968	"Stay in My Corner" (First re-recorded version) b/w "Love Is So Simple"	10	1	13	—	—	There Is
1968	"Always Together" b/w "I Want My Momma"	18	3	36	—	—	The Dells Musical Menu/Always Together
1968	"Does Anybody Know I'm Here" b/w "Make Sure (You Have Someone Who Loves You)"	38	15	38	—	—	The Dells Musical Menu/Always Together
1969	"Hallways of My Mind" /	92	44	84	—	—	The Dells Musical Menu/Always Together
1969	"I Can't Do Enough"	98	20	—	—	—	The Dells Musical Menu/Always Together
1969	"I Can Sing a Rainbow" / "Love Is Blue" b/w "Hallelujah Baby" (from The Dells Musical Menu/Always Together)	22	5	9	10	15	Love Is Blue
1969	"Oh, What a Night" (Re-recorded version) b/w "Believe Me" (from The Dells Musical Menu/Always Together)	10	1	11	—	—	Love Is Blue
1969	"Sittin' On the Dock of the Bay" />b/w "When I'm in Your Arms"	42	13	—	—	—	Love Is Blue
1969	"When I'm in Your Arms"	108	—	—	—	—	There Is
1970	"Oh What a Day" b/w "The Change We Go Thru (For Love)" (from There Is)	43	10	37	—	—	Like It Is Like It Was
1970	"Open Up My Heart" /	51	5	45	—	—	Like It Is Like It Was
1970	"Nadine"	51	5	—	—	—	Like It Is Like It Was
1970	"Long Lonely Nights" b/w "A Little Understanding" (from Love Is Blue)	74	27	—	—	—	Like It Is Like It Was
1971	"The Glory of Love" b/w "A Whiter Shade of Pale"	92	30	—	—	—	Love Is Blue
1971	"The Love We Had (Stays on My Mind)" b/w "Freedom Means"	30	8	—	—	—	Freedom Means...
1972	"Oh, My Dear" /	—	36	—	—	—	Sweet as Funk Can Be
1972	"It's All Up to You"	94	23	—	—	—	Freedom Means...
1972	"Walk On By" b/w "This Guy's in Love with You"	—	—	—	—	—	The Dells Sing Dionne Warwicke's Greatest Hits
1972	"Just as Long as We're in Love" b/w "I'd Rather Be with You" (from Freedom Means...)	—	35	—	—	—	Sweet as Funk Can Be
1973	"Give Your Baby a Standing Ovation" b/w "Closer"	34	3	—	—	—	Give Your Baby a Standing Ovation
1973	"My Pretending Days Are Over" b/w "Let's Make It Last"	51	10	—	—	—	The Dells
1973	"I Miss You" b/w "Don't Make Me a Story Teller"	60	8	—	—	—	The Dells
1974	"I Wish It Was Me You Loved" b/w "Two Together Is Better Than One" (Non-album track)	94	11	—	—	—	The Dells VS. The Dramatics
1974	"Learning to Love You Was Easy (It's So Hard Trying to Get Over You)" /	—	18	—	—	—	The Mighty Mighty Dells
1974	"Bring Back the Love of Yesterday"	87	—	—	—	—	The Mighty Mighty Dells
1975	"The Glory of Love" b/w "You're the Greatest" (from No Way Back); A-side chart reentry	—	59	—	—	—	Give Your Baby a Standing Ovation
1975	"Love Is Missing from Our Lives" b/w "I'm in Love"; Both sides with The Dramatics	—	46	—	—	—	The Dells VS. The Dramatics
1975	"We Got to Get Our Thing Together" b/w "Reminiscing"	104	17	—	—	—	We Got to Get Our Thing Together
1976	"The Power of Love" b/w "Gotta Get Home to My Baby"	106	58	—	—	—	We Got to Get Our Thing Together
1976	"Slow Motion" b/w "Ain't No Black and White in Music"	102	49	—	—	—	No Way Back
1976	"No Way Back" b/w "Too Late for Love"	—	68	—	—	—	No Way Back
1977	"Our Love" b/w "Could It Be"	—	20	—	—	—	They Said I Couldn't Be Done, But We Did It!
1977	"Betcha Never Been Loved (Like This Before)" b/w "Get On Down"	—	29	—	—	—	They Said I Couldn't Be Done, But We Did It!
1978	"Private Property" b/w "Teaser" (from They Said It Couldn't Be Done...)	—	57	—	—	—	Love Connection
1978	"Super Woman" b/w "My Life Is So Wonderful (When You're Around)"	108	24	—	—	—	New Beginnings
1978	"I Wanna Testify"; Original B-side: "Drowning for Your Love"; Later B-side: "Don't Save Me" (Non-album track)	—	—	—	—	—	New Beginnings
1979	"(You Bring Out) The Best in Me" b/w "Wrapped Up Tight"	—	34	—	—	—	Face to Face
1979	"Thought I Could" b/w "Plastic People"	—	—	—	—	—	Face to Face
1980	"I Touched a Dream" b/w "All About the Paper"	—	17	—	—	—	I Touched a Dream
1980	"Passionate Breezes" b/w "Your Song"	—	76	—	—	—	I Touched a Dream
1981	"Happy Song" b/w "Look at Us Now" (from I Touched a Dream)	—	64	—	—	—	Whatever Turns You On
1981	"Stay in My Corner" (Second re-recorded version) b/w "Ain't It a Shame"	—	80	—	—	—	Whatever Turns You On
1984	"You Just Can't Walk Away" b/w "Don't Want Nobody"	107	23	—	—	—	One Step Closer
1984	"One Step Closer" b/w "Come On Back to Me"	—	46	—	—	—	One Step Closer
1984	"Love On" b/w "Don't Want Nobody"	—	60	—	—	—	One Step Closer
1988	"My Lady, So Perfect for Me" b/w "Sweetness"	—	—	—	—	—	The Second Time
1988	"Thought of You a Little Too Much" b/w "That's How Heartaches Are Made"	—	66	—	—	—	The Second Time
1988	"That's How Heartaches Are Made" b/w "Can We Skip That Part"	—	—	—	—	—	The Second Time
1991	"A Heart Is a House For Love" b/w "Stay in My Corner"	—	13	—	—	—	"The Five Heartbeats" various artists soundtrack
1992	"Come and Get It" (Radio edit); CD single...also includes unedited album version	—	62	—	—	—	I Salute You
1992	"Oh My Love"	—	81	—	—	—	I Salute You
"—" denotes a recording that did not chart or was not released in that territory.

== Appearances ==
With Bunky Green

- The Latinization of Bunky Green (Cadet, 1966)
