= List of Rock and Roll Hall of Fame inductees =

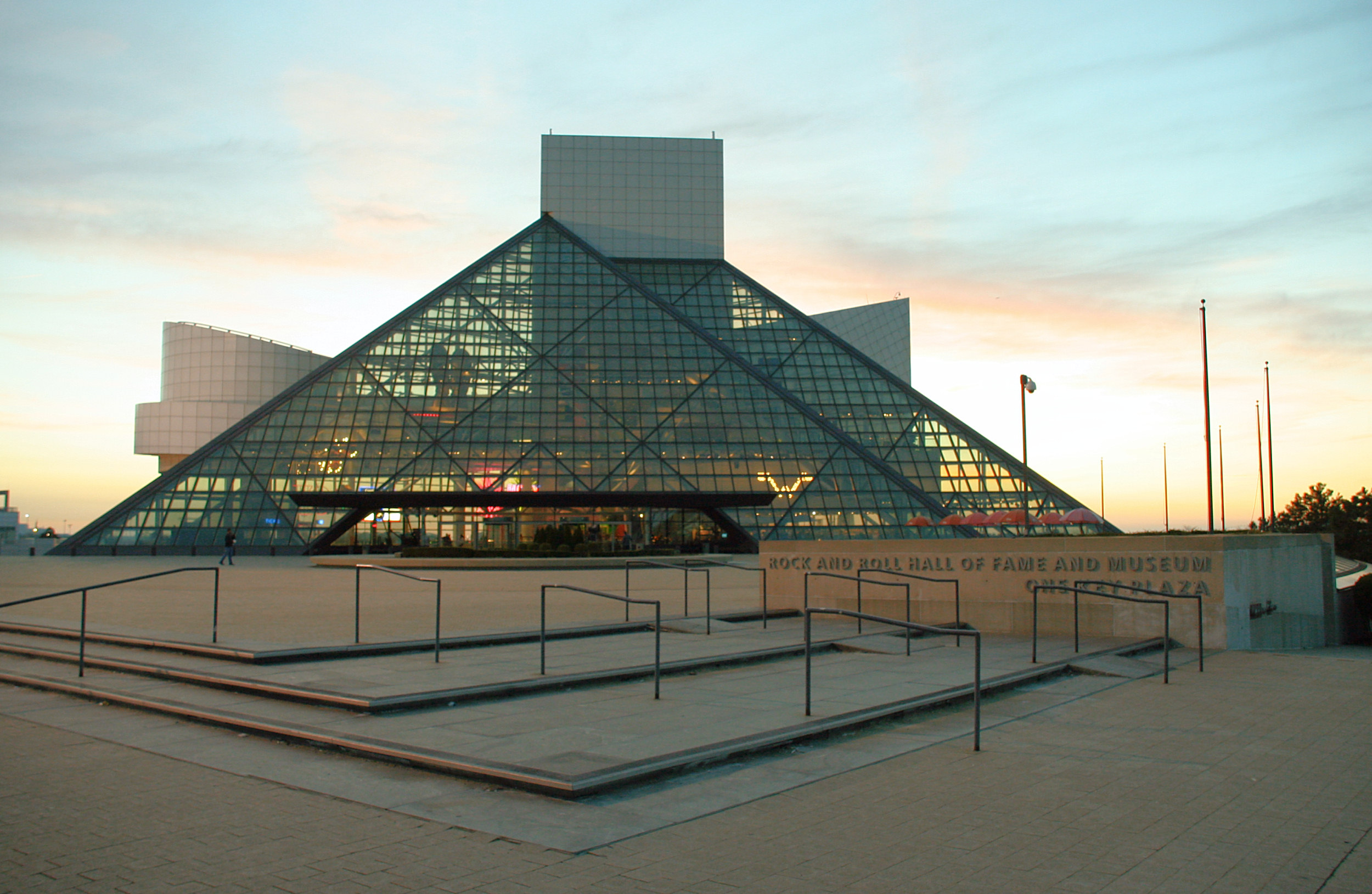
The Rock and Roll Hall of Fame

The Rock and Roll Hall of Fame, established in 1983 and located in Cleveland, Ohio, United States, is dedicated to recording the history of some of the best-known and most influential musicians, bands, producers, and others that have in some major way influenced the music industry, particularly in the area of rock and roll. Originally, there were four categories of induction: performers, non-performers, early influences, and lifetime achievement. In 2000, sidemen was introduced as a category, which has since been altered to musical excellence.

The only category that has seen new inductees every single year is the performers category. Artists become eligible for induction in that category 25 years after the release of their first record. In order to be inducted, an artist must be nominated by a committee that selects a number of candidates. Ballots are then sent to more than 1,000 "rock experts" who evaluate the candidates and vote on who should be inducted. The performers that receive the highest number of votes are inducted. This number varies; for example, seven were inducted in 2019. Starting in 2012, fans could vote on a fan ballot with an equal weight to the other ballots. New inductees are honored at an annual ceremony held at the Hall of Fame in Cleveland every even-numbered year and either New York City or Los Angeles every odd-numbered year.

The three other categories are selected by committees instead of the annual ballot. In 2025, Rock Hall chairman John Sykes said, "No matter what category you're in, Performer or those other three, it's the same size plaque on the wall right next to Bob Dylan, Aretha Franklin, and the Beatles. It's not a secondary award. It's equal to getting in as a performer."

== Inductees ==
=== Performers ===
The performers category is meant for recording artists and bands that have "influence and significance to the development and perpetuation of rock and roll".

Year	Image	Name	Inducted members	Prior nominations	Induction presenter
1986	Publicity photo of Chuck Berry.	Chuck Berry		Inaugural class	Keith Richards^{[N2]}
1986	James Brown performing in Hamburg, Germany, February 1973	James Brown		Inaugural class	Steve Winwood^{[N2]}
1986	Photo of Ray Charles in one of his classic poses at the piano.	Ray Charles		Inaugural class	Quincy Jones^{[N2]}
1986		Sam Cooke		Inaugural class	Herb Alpert^{[N2]}
1986	Fats Domino in Amsterdam 1962	Fats Domino		Inaugural class	Billy Joel^{[N2]}
1986	Phil (left) and Don (right) Everly in 1958	The Everly Brothers	Don Everly and Phil Everly.	Inaugural class	Neil Young^{[N2]}
1986	Buddy Holly in 1957	Buddy Holly		Inaugural class	John Fogerty^{[N2]}
1986	Lewis performing in the 1950s	Jerry Lee Lewis		Inaugural class	Hank Williams Jr.
1986	Little Richard in 1967	Little Richard		Inaugural class	Roberta Flack
1986	Presley in a publicity photograph for the 1957 film Jailhouse Rock	Elvis Presley		Inaugural class	Julian and Sean Lennon
1987		The Coasters	Carl Gardner, Cornell Gunter, Billy Guy, and Will "Dub" Jones.	1 (1986)	Lester Sill
1987		Eddie Cochran		1 (1986)	Mick Jones^{[N2]}
1987	Publicity portrait of American blues musician Bo Diddley, 1957, sitting with his "Twang Machine", a unique square electric guitar built for him by Gretsch.	Bo Diddley		1 (1986)	ZZ Top^{[N2]}
1987	Publicity photo of Aretha Franklin from Billboard, 17 February 1968	Aretha Franklin		First nomination	Keith Richards^{[N2]}
1987	Gaye in 1973	Marvin Gaye		1 (1986)	Nick Ashford and Valerie Simpson
1987	Haley in 1974	Bill Haley		1 (1986)	Chuck Berry^{[N3]}
1987		B. B. King		1 (1986)	Sting^{[N2]}
1987		Clyde McPhatter		1 (1986)	Ben E. King^{[N2]}
1987		Ricky Nelson		1 (1986)	John Fogerty^{[N2]}
1987	Orbison in 1965	Roy Orbison		1 (1986)	Bruce Springsteen^{[N2]}
1987	Perkins in 1977	Carl Perkins		First nomination	Sam Phillips^{[N3]}
1987		Smokey Robinson		1 (1986)	Daryl Hall^{[N2]} and John Oates^{[N2]}
1987		Big Joe Turner		1 (1986)	Doc Pomus^{[N2]}
1987		Muddy Waters		1 (1986)	Paul Butterfield^{[N2]}
1987		Jackie Wilson		1 (1986)	Peter Wolf
1988		The Beach Boys	Al Jardine, Mike Love, Brian Wilson, Carl Wilson, and Dennis Wilson.	First nomination; First year of eligibility	Elton John^{[N2]}
1988	The Beatles in 1967	The Beatles	George Harrison, John Lennon, Paul McCartney, and Ringo Starr.	First nomination; First year of eligibility	Mick Jagger^{[N2]}
1988		The Drifters	Ben E. King, Rudy Lewis, Clyde McPhatter, Johnny Moore, Bill Pinkney, Charlie Thomas, and Gerhart Thrasher.	1 (1986)	Billy Joel^{[N2]}
1988	Dylan performing live onstage at Mini Estadi in Barcelona in 1984	Bob Dylan		First nomination; First year of eligibility	Bruce Springsteen^{[N2]}
1988		The Supremes	Florence Ballard, Diana Ross, and Mary Wilson.	1 (1987)	Little Richard^{[N3]}
1989	Dion performing in New York	Dion		3 (1986, 1987, 1988)	Lou Reed^{[N2]}
1989	Otis Redding in January 1967	Otis Redding		First nomination	Little Richard^{[N3]}
1989	The Rolling Stones in 1965. From left: Brian Jones, Mick Jagger, Keith Richards, Bill Wyman and Charlie Watts.	The Rolling Stones	Mick Jagger, Brian Jones, Keith Richards, Ian Stewart, Mick Taylor, Charlie Watts, Ronnie Wood, and Bill Wyman.	First nomination; First year of eligibility	Pete Townshend^{[N2]}
1989		The Temptations	Melvin Franklin, Eddie Kendricks, David Ruffin, Otis Williams, Paul Williams, and Dennis Edwards.	First nomination	Daryl Hall^{[N2]} and John Oates^{[N2]}
1989	Wonder in a recording studio, 1973	Stevie Wonder		First nomination	Paul Simon^{[N2]}
1990	Hank Ballard	Hank Ballard		4 (1986, 1987, 1988, 1989)	Boz Scaggs
1990		Bobby Darin		4 (1986, 1987, 1988, 1989)	Paul Anka
1990		The Four Seasons	Tom DeVito, Bob Gaudio, Nick Massi, and Frankie Valli.	2 (1988, 1989)	Bob Crewe
1990		The Four Tops	Renaldo "Obie" Benson, Abdul "Duke" Fakir, Lawrence Payton, and Levi Stubbs.	1 (1989)	Stevie Wonder^{[N3]}
1990	left to right: Pete Quaife, Dave Davies, Ray Davies, Mick Avory.	The Kinks	Mick Avory, Dave Davies, Ray Davies, and Pete Quaife.	First nomination; First year of eligibility	Graham Nash^{[N2]}
1990		The Platters	David Lynch, Herb Reed, Paul Robi, Zola Taylor, and Tony Williams.	2 (1988, 1989)	Phil Spector^{[N3]}
1990	Paul Simon (right) and Art Garfunkel performing in Dublin, 1982	Simon & Garfunkel	Paul Simon and Art Garfunkel.	First nomination; First year of eligibility	James Taylor^{[N2]}
1990	The Who in 1965	The Who	Roger Daltrey, John Entwistle, Keith Moon, and Pete Townshend.	First nomination; First year of eligibility	U2^{[N2]}
1991	Baker in 1956	LaVern Baker		5 (1986, 1987, 1988, 1989, 1990)	Chaka Khan^{[N2]}
1991	The Byrds in 1965	The Byrds	Gene Clark, Michael Clarke, David Crosby, Chris Hillman, and Roger McGuinn.	First nomination; First year of eligibility	Don Henley^{[N2]}
1991		John Lee Hooker		First nomination	Bonnie Raitt^{[N2]}
1991	The Impressions in 1964	The Impressions	Curtis Mayfield, Sam Gooden, Fred Cash, Arthur Brooks, Richard Brooks, and Jerry Butler.	2 (1989, 1990)	Tracy Chapman
1991		Wilson Pickett		2 (1989, 1990)	Bobby Brown
1991		Jimmy Reed		5 (1986, 1987, 1988, 1989, 1990)	ZZ Top^{[N2]}
1991		Ike & Tina Turner	Ike Turner and Tina Turner.	2 (1989, 1990)	Phil Spector^{[N3]}
1992	Bobby Bland at the Long Beach Blues Festival, 1996	Bobby "Blue" Bland		5 (1986, 1987, 1988, 1989, 1991)	B.B. King^{[N3]}
1992		Booker T. & the M.G.'s	Booker T. Jones, Steve Cropper, Donald "Duck" Dunn, Al Jackson Jr., and Lewie Steinberg.	2 (1988, 1989)	Jim Stewart^{[N2]}
1992	Cash in 1969	Johnny Cash		2 (1990, 1991)	Lyle Lovett
1992		The Isley Brothers	Ernie Isley, Marvin Isley, O'Kelly Isley Jr., Ronald Isley, Rudolph Isley, and Chris Jasper.	First nomination	Little Richard^{[N3]}
1992		The Jimi Hendrix Experience	Jimi Hendrix, Mitch Mitchell, and Noel Redding.	First nomination; First year of eligibility	Neil Young^{[N2]}
1992		Sam & Dave	Sam Moore and Dave Prater.	First nomination; First year of eligibility	Billy Joel^{[N2]}
1992		The Yardbirds	Jeff Beck, Eric Clapton, Chris Dreja, Jim McCarty, Jimmy Page, Keith Relf, and Paul Samwell-Smith.	2 (1990, 1991)	The Edge^{[N2]}
1993	Ruth Brown in 1955	Ruth Brown		5 (1986, 1987, 1988, 1989, 1990)	Bonnie Raitt^{[N2]}
1993	Cream in 1967. From left to right: Ginger Baker, Jack Bruce, and Eric Clapton.	Cream	Ginger Baker, Jack Bruce, and Eric Clapton.	1 (1992)	ZZ Top^{[N2]}
1993	Creedence Clearwater Revival in 1968. From left to right: Tom Fogerty, Doug Clifford, Stu Cook, and John Fogerty.	Creedence Clearwater Revival	Doug Clifford, Stu Cook, John Fogerty, and Tom Fogerty.	First nomination; First year of eligibility	Bruce Springsteen^{[N2]}
1993	Promotional photo of the Doors in late 1966 (l–r: John Densmore, Robby Krieger, Ray Manzarek, and Jim Morrison)	The Doors	John Densmore, Robby Krieger, Ray Manzarek, and Jim Morrison.	First nomination; First year of eligibility	Eddie Vedder^{[N2]}
1993		Frankie Lymon & The Teenagers	Herman Santiago, Jimmy Merchant, Sherman Garnes, Frankie Lymon, and Joe Negroni.	7 (1986, 1987, 1988, 1989, 1990, 1991, 1992)	Boyz II Men
1993	Etta James in Deauville, France, July 1990	Etta James		1 (1992)	k.d. lang
1993		Van Morrison		First nomination; First year of eligibility	Robbie Robertson^{[N2]}
1993		Sly and the Family Stone	Gregg Errico, Larry Graham, Jerry Martini, Cynthia Robinson, Freddie Stone, Rosie Stone, and Sly Stone.	First nomination; First year of eligibility	George Clinton^{[N2]}
1994		The Animals	Eric Burdon, Chas Chandler, Alan Price, John Steel, and Hilton Valentine.	2 (1990, 1993)	Dave Pirner
1994	The Band in 1969. Left to right: Manuel, Hudson, Helm, Robertson, and Danko.	The Band	Rick Danko, Levon Helm, Garth Hudson, Richard Manuel, and Robbie Robertson.	First nomination; First year of eligibility	Eric Clapton^{[N3]}
1994		Duane Eddy		7 (1986, 1987, 1988, 1989, 1990, 1991, 1992)	Mick Jones^{[N2]}
1994	The Grateful Dead in 1970, from a promotional photo shoot. Left to right: Bill Kreutzmann, Ron "Pigpen" McKernan, Jerry Garcia, Bob Weir, Mickey Hart, Phil Lesh.	The Grateful Dead	Tom Constanten, Jerry Garcia, Donna Jean Godchaux, Keith Godchaux, Mickey Hart, Robert Hunter, Bill Kreutzmann, Phil Lesh, Ron McKernan, Brent Mydland, Bob Weir, and Vince Welnick.	1 (1993)	Bruce Hornsby
1994		Elton John		First nomination; First year of eligibility	Axl Rose^{[N2]}
1994		John Lennon		First nomination; First year of eligibility	Paul McCartney^{[N3]}
1994	Marley performing in 1980	Bob Marley		1 (1990)	Bono^{[N2]}
1994		Rod Stewart		1 (1993)	Jeff Beck^{[N3]}
1995		The Allman Brothers Band	Duane Allman, Gregg Allman, Dickey Betts, Jai Johanny Johanson, Berry Oakley, and Butch Trucks.	First nomination; First year of eligibility	Willie Nelson^{[N2]}
1995		Al Green		First nomination; First year of eligibility	Natalie Cole
1995		Janis Joplin		First nomination; First year of eligibility	Melissa Etheridge
1995	From left to right: John Paul Jones, Jimmy Page, John Bonham, Robert Plant	Led Zeppelin	John Bonham, John Paul Jones, Jimmy Page, and Robert Plant.	First nomination; First year of eligibility	Steven Tyler^{[N2]} and Joe Perry^{[N2]}
1995		Martha and the Vandellas	Rosalind Ashford, Annette Beard, Betty Kelly, Lois Reeves, and Martha Reeves.	2 (1989, 1994)	Fred Schneider and Kate Pierson
1995		Neil Young		First nomination; First year of eligibility	Eddie Vedder^{[N2]}
1995	Frank Zappa performing in 1977	Frank Zappa		2 (1993, 1994)	Lou Reed^{[N2]}
1996	Bowie at Tweeter Center in Tinley Park during the Heathen Tour in 2002	David Bowie		1 (1992)	Madonna^{[N2]} and David Byrne^{[N2]}
1996	Left to right: William "Red" Guest, Edward Patten, Merald "Bubba" Knight, and Gladys Knight	Gladys Knight & the Pips	William Guest, Gladys Knight, Merald "Bubba" Knight, and Edward Patten.	3 (1987, 1989, 1990)	Mariah Carey
1996	Jefferson Airplane photographed by Herb Greene at The Matrix club, San Francisco, in 1966. Top row from left: Jack Casady Grace Slick, Marty Balin; bottom row from left: Jorma Kaukonen, Paul Kantner, Spencer Dryden. A cropped version was used for the front cover of Surrealistic Pillow.	Jefferson Airplane	Marty Balin, Jack Casady, Spencer Dryden, Paul Kantner, Jorma Kaukonen, and Grace Slick.	1 (1995)	Mickey Hart^{[N3]} and Phil Lesh^{[N3]}
1996		Little Willie John		7 (1986, 1987, 1988, 1989, 1990, 1993, 1995)	Stevie Wonder^{[N3]}
1996		Pink Floyd	Syd Barrett, David Gilmour, Nick Mason, Roger Waters, and Rick Wright.	1 (1994)	Billy Corgan
1996		The Shirelles	Shirley Alston Reeves, Addie Harris, Doris Kenner-Jackson, and Beverly Lee.	2 (1990, 1995)	Merry Clayton, Marianne Faithfull, and Darlene Love^{[N2]}
1996		The Velvet Underground	John Cale, Sterling Morrison, Lou Reed, and Maureen Tucker.	4 (1992, 1993, 1994, 1995)	Patti Smith^{[N2]}
1997	Bee Gees in 1978 (top to bottom) Barry, Robin, and Maurice Gibb	Bee Gees	Barry Gibb, Maurice Gibb, and Robin Gibb.	1 (1996)	Brian Wilson^{[N3]}
1997		Buffalo Springfield	Richie Furay, Dewey Martin, Bruce Palmer, Stephen Stills, and Neil Young.	4 (1992, 1993, 1994, 1995)	Tom Petty^{[N2]}
1997		Crosby, Stills & Nash	David Crosby, Graham Nash, and Stephen Stills.	First nomination	James Taylor^{[N2]}
1997		The Jackson 5	Jackie Jackson, Jermaine Jackson, Marlon Jackson, Michael Jackson, and Tito Jackson.	3 (1994, 1995, 1996)	Diana Ross^{[N3]}
1997		Joni Mitchell		2 (1994, 1995)	Shawn Colvin
1997		Parliament-Funkadelic	Jerome Brailey, George Clinton, Bootsy Collins, Raymond Davis, Tiki Fulwood, Glenn Goins, Michael Hampton, Fuzzy Haskins, Eddie Hazel, Walter Morrison, Cordell Mosson, William "Billy Bass" Nelson, Garry Shider, Calvin Simon, Grady Thomas, and Bernie Worrell.	2 (1995, 1996)	Prince^{[N2]}
1997		The (Young) Rascals	Eddie Brigati, Felix Cavaliere, Gene Cornish, and Dino Danelli.	3 (1993, 1994, 1996)	Steven Van Zandt^{[N2]}
1998		Eagles	Don Felder, Glenn Frey, Don Henley, Bernie Leadon, Randy Meisner, Timothy B. Schmit, and Joe Walsh.	First nomination; First year of eligibility	Jimmy Buffett^{[N2]}
1998	Fleetwood Mac in 1977. From left to right: Mick Fleetwood, Christine McVie, John McVie, Stevie Nicks, and Lindsey Buckingham.	Fleetwood Mac	Lindsey Buckingham, Mick Fleetwood, Peter Green, Danny Kirwan, Christine McVie, John McVie, Stevie Nicks, and Jeremy Spencer.	First nomination	Sheryl Crow^{[N2]}
1998		The Mamas & the Papas	Denny Doherty, Cass Elliot, John Phillips, and Michelle Phillips.	1 (1997)	Shania Twain
1998		Lloyd Price		6 (1986, 1987, 1988, 1989, 1996, 1997)	Tony Rich
1998		Santana	Jose Chepito Areas, David Brown, Michael Carabello, Gregg Rolie, Carlos Santana, and Michael Shrieve.	First nomination	John Popper
1998		Gene Vincent		6 (1986, 1987, 1988, 1989, 1990, 1991)	John Fogerty^{[N3]}
1999		Billy Joel		1 (1998)	Ray Charles^{[N3]}
1999		Curtis Mayfield		First nomination	Sean Combs
1999		Paul McCartney		First nomination	Neil Young^{[N3]}
1999		Del Shannon		5 (1987, 1988, 1989, 1990, 1998)	Art Alexakis
1999		Dusty Springfield		1 (1998)	Elton John^{[N3]}
1999	Springsteen performing at the Roskilde Festival, Denmark, 2012	Bruce Springsteen		First nomination; First year of eligibility	Bono^{[N2]}
1999		The Staple Singers	Cleotha Staples, Mavis Staples, Pervis Staples, Pops Staples, and Yvonne Staples.	First nomination	Lauryn Hill
2000		Eric Clapton		First nomination	Robbie Robertson^{[N3]}
2000		Earth, Wind & Fire	Philip Bailey, Larry Dunn, Johnny Graham, Ralph Johnson, Al McKay, Fred White, Maurice White, Verdine White, and Andrew Woolfolk.	1 (1998)	Lil Kim
2000		The Lovin' Spoonful	Steve Boone, Joe Butler, John Sebastian, and Zal Yanovsky.	First nomination	John Mellencamp^{[N2]}
2000		The Moonglows	Prentiss Barnes, Harvey Fuqua, Peter Graves, Billy Johnson, and Bobby Lester.	6 (1991, 1994, 1996, 1997, 1998, 1999)	Paul Simon^{[N3]}
2000	Bonnie Raitt at the Rock and Roll Hall of Fame in 2000	Bonnie Raitt		First nomination	Melissa Etheridge
2000		James Taylor		First nomination	Paul McCartney^{[N3]}
2001		Aerosmith	Tom Hamilton, Joey Kramer, Joe Perry, Steven Tyler, and Brad Whitford.	1 (2000)	Kid Rock
2001	Solomon Burke performing on April 19, 2008	Solomon Burke		8 (1987, 1989, 1990, 1996, 1997, 1998, 1999, 2000)	Mary J. Blige^{[N2]}
2001		The Flamingos	Jake Carey, Zeke Carey, Johnny Carter, Tommy Hunt, Terry "Buzzy" Johnson, Sollie McElroy, Nate Nelson, and Paul Wilson.	4 (1987, 1996, 1999, 2000)	Frankie Valli^{[N3]}
2001		Michael Jackson		First nomination	NSYNC
2001	Top: Brian May, Freddie Mercury Bottom: John Deacon, Roger Taylor	Queen	John Deacon, Brian May, Freddie Mercury, and Roger Taylor.	1 (2000)	Dave Grohl^{[N2]} and Taylor Hawkins^{[N2]}
2001	Paul Simon performing at the Feijenoord Stadion, Rotterdam, The Netherlands in 1982.	Paul Simon		First nomination	Marc Anthony
2001		Steely Dan	Walter Becker and Donald Fagen.	2 (1999, 2000)	Moby
2001		Ritchie Valens		2 (1999, 2000)	Ricky Martin
2002		Isaac Hayes		First nomination	Alicia Keys
2002	Lee in 1977	Brenda Lee		2 (1990, 2001)	Jewel
2002	Tom Petty	Tom Petty and the Heartbreakers	Tom Petty, Ron Blair, Mike Campbell, Howie Epstein, Stan Lynch, and Benmont Tench.	First nomination; First year of eligibility	Jakob Dylan
2002		Gene Pitney		6 (1989, 1990, 1992, 1997, 1998, 1999)	Darlene Love^{[N2]}
2002	The Ramones in 1977	Ramones	Dee Dee Ramone, Joey Ramone, Johnny Ramone, Marky Ramone, and Tommy Ramone.	First nomination; First year of eligibility	Eddie Vedder^{[N2]}
2002		Talking Heads	David Byrne, Chris Frantz, Jerry Harrison, and Tina Weymouth.	First nomination; First year of eligibility	Anthony Kiedis^{[N2]}
2003	AC/DC, from left to right: Brian Johnson, Malcolm Young, Phil Rudd, Angus Young, Cliff Williams, performing at the Tacoma Dome in Tacoma, Washington on August 31, 2009.	AC/DC	Brian Johnson, Phil Rudd, Bon Scott, Cliff Williams, Angus Young, and Malcolm Young.	2 (2001, 2002)	Steven Tyler^{[N3]}
2003	The Clash in 1980	The Clash	Terry Chimes, Topper Headon, Mick Jones, Paul Simonon, and Joe Strummer.	First nomination; First year of eligibility	The Edge^{[N2]} and Tom Morello^{[N2]}
2003	Elvis Costello	Elvis Costello & the Attractions	Elvis Costello, Steve Nieve, Bruce Thomas, and Pete Thomas.	First nomination; First year of eligibility	Elton John^{[N3]}
2003	The Police in 1979, left to right: Stewart Copeland, Sting, Andy Summers	The Police	Stewart Copeland, Sting, and Andy Summers.	First nomination; First year of eligibility	Gwen Stefani
2003		The Righteous Brothers	Bobby Hatfield and Bill Medley.	First nomination	Billy Joel^{[N3]}
2004		Jackson Browne		1 (2002)	Bruce Springsteen^{[N3]}
2004		The Dells	Verne Allison, Chuck Barksdale, Johnny Carter, Johnny Funches, Marvin Junior, and Michael McGill.	2 (2002, 2003)	Robert Townsend
2004		George Harrison		First nomination	Tom Petty^{[N3]} and Jeff Lynne^{[N2]}
2004		Prince		First nomination; First year of eligibility	Outkast^{[N2]} and Alicia Keys
2004		Bob Seger		1 (2001)	Kid Rock
2004		Traffic	Jim Capaldi, Dave Mason, Steve Winwood, and Chris Wood.	First nomination	Dave Matthews^{[N2]}
2004	ZZ Top performing at St. Augustine Amphitheatre in Florida on May 22, 2008, from left to right: Dusty Hill, Frank Beard (drumming), and Billy Gibbons	ZZ Top	Frank Beard, Billy Gibbons, and Dusty Hill.	First nomination	Keith Richards^{[N3]}
2005		Buddy Guy		First nomination	Eric Clapton^{[N3]} and B.B. King^{[N3]}
2005		The O'Jays	Eddie Levert, Bobby Massey, William Powell, Sammy Strain, and Walter Williams.	1 (2000)	Justin Timberlake
2005		The Pretenders	Martin Chambers, Pete Farndon, James Honeyman-Scott, and Chrissie Hynde.	First nomination; First year of eligibility	Neil Young^{[N3]}
2005	Sledge at the 2010 Alabama Music Hall of Fame Concert	Percy Sledge		First nomination	Rod Stewart^{[N3]}
2005		U2	Bono, Adam Clayton, The Edge, and Larry Mullen, Jr.	First nomination; First year of eligibility	Bruce Springsteen^{[N3]}
2006	Left to right: Geezer Butler, Tony Iommi, Bill Ward, Ozzy Osbourne	Black Sabbath	Geezer Butler, Tony Iommi, Ozzy Osbourne, and Bill Ward.	7 (1997, 1999, 2000, 2001, 2002, 2003, 2004)	James Hetfield^{[N2]} and Lars Ulrich^{[N2]}
2006	Blondie in 1977. L-R: Gary Valentine, Clem Burke, Debbie Harry, Chris Stein, and Jimmy Destri	Blondie	Clem Burke, Jimmy Destri, Nigel Harrison, Debbie Harry, Frank Infante, Chris Stein, and Gary Valentine.	First nomination	Shirley Manson
2006		Miles Davis		First nomination	Herbie Hancock
2006		Lynyrd Skynyrd	Bob Burns, Allen Collins, Steve Gaines, Ed King, Billy Powell, Artimus Pyle, Gary Rossington, Ronnie Van Zant, and Leon Wilkeson.	6 (1997, 2001, 2002, 2003, 2004, 2005)	Kid Rock
2006	The Sex Pistols in Amsterdam in 1977 (L–R: Paul Cook, Glen Matlock, Johnny Rotten and Steve Jones)	Sex Pistols	Paul Cook, Steve Jones, Glen Matlock, John Lydon, and Sid Vicious.	4 (2002, 2003, 2004, 2005)	Jann Wenner^{[N3]}
2007		Grandmaster Flash and the Furious Five	Melvin "Melle Mel" Glover, Nathaniel "The Kidd Creole" Glover, Eddie "Scorpio" Morris, Joseph "Grandmaster Flash" Sadler, Robert Keith "Keef Cowboy" Wiggins, and Guy Todd "Rahiem" Williams.	2 (2005, 2006)	Jay-Z^{[N2]}
2007	Left to right: Mike Mills, Michael Stipe, touring drummer Bill Rieflin (not inducted with the band), and Peter Buck.	R.E.M.	Bill Berry, Peter Buck, Mike Mills, and Michael Stipe.	First nomination; First year of eligibility	Eddie Vedder^{[N2]}
2007		The Ronettes	Estelle Bennett, Ronnie Spector, and Nedra Talley.	First nomination	Keith Richards^{[N3]}
2007	Patti Smith in 1978	Patti Smith		6 (2001, 2002, 2003, 2004, 2005, 2006)	Zack de la Rocha^{[N2]}
2007		Van Halen	Michael Anthony, Sammy Hagar, David Lee Roth, Alex Van Halen, and Eddie Van Halen.	First nomination	Velvet Revolver
2008	Get Yourself a College Girl appearance, 1964 – From left: Mike Smith, Lenny Davidson, Denis Payton, Rick Huxley, and Dave Clark.	The Dave Clark Five	Dave Clark, Lenny Davidson, Rick Huxley, Denis Payton, and Mike Smith.	2 (2006, 2007)	Tom Hanks
2008	Cohen in 1988	Leonard Cohen		First nomination	Lou Reed^{[N3]}
2008	Madonna on her Rebel Heart Tour	Madonna		First nomination; First year of eligibility	Justin Timberlake
2008	Mellencamp in 2007	John Mellencamp		2 (2004, 2006)	Billy Joel^{[N3]}
2008	Classic lineup of the Ventures in 1967	The Ventures	Bob Bogle, Nokie Edwards, Gerry McGee, Mel Taylor, and Don Wilson.	First nomination	John Fogerty^{[N3]}
2009	Beck playing in 1973	Jeff Beck		First nomination	Jimmy Page^{[N3]}
2009		Little Anthony and the Imperials	Clarence Collins, Anthony Gourdine, Tracy Lord, Glouster "Nat" Rogers, Sammy Strain, and Ernest Wright Jr.	First nomination	Smokey Robinson^{[N3]}
2009		Metallica	Cliff Burton, Kirk Hammett, James Hetfield, Jason Newsted, Robert Trujillo, and Lars Ulrich.	First nomination	Flea^{[N2]}
2009		Run-DMC	Darryl "D.M.C." McDaniels, Jason "Jam-Master Jay" Mizell, and Joseph "DJ Run" Simmons.	First nomination; First year of eligibility	Eminem^{[N2]}
2009	Womack performing at Roskilde Festival, Denmark, 2010	Bobby Womack		First nomination	Ron Wood^{[N3]}
2010	ABBA in 1974, from left to right: Benny Andersson, Anni-Frid Lyngstad (Frida), Agnetha Fältskog, and Björn Ulvaeus	ABBA	Benny Andersson, Agnetha Fältskog, Anni-Frid Lyngstad, and Björn Ulvaeus.	1 (2003)	Barry^{[N3]} and Robin Gibb^{[N3]}
2010	Cliff performing live	Jimmy Cliff		First nomination	Wyclef Jean
2010	L-R: Rutherford, Gabriel (in Slipperman costume) and Collins in 1974 during The Lamb... tour	Genesis	Tony Banks, Phil Collins, Peter Gabriel, Steve Hackett, and Mike Rutherford.	First nomination	Trey Anastasio
2010		The Hollies	Bernie Calvert, Allan Clarke, Bobby Elliott, Eric Haydock, Tony Hicks, Graham Nash, and Terry Sylvester.	First nomination	Steven Van Zandt^{[N2]}
2010	Iggy Pop and the Stooges performing at Katowice Off Festval, Poland, on August 4, 2012	The Stooges	Dave Alexander, Ron Asheton, Scott Asheton, Iggy Pop, and James Williamson.	7 (1997, 1998, 2004, 2005, 2006, 2007, 2009)	Billie Joe Armstrong^{[N2]}
2011	Lead singer Alice Cooper performing live during Halloween Night of Horror at London Wembley Arena on October 28, 2012	Alice Cooper	Alice Cooper, Michael Owen Bruce, Glen Buxton, Dennis Dunaway, and Neal Smith.	First nomination	Rob Zombie
2011	Diamond performing in 2015	Neil Diamond		First nomination	Paul Simon^{[N3]}
2011		Dr. John		First nomination	John Legend
2011	Love in 2013	Darlene Love		2 (1999, 2010)	Bette Midler
2011	Publicity photo of American musician Tom Waits circa 1974–75, around the time Asylum Records was promoting his second album, The Heart of Saturday Night.	Tom Waits		First nomination	Neil Young^{[N3]}
2012		Beastie Boys	Michael "Mike D" Diamond, Adam "Ad-Rock" Horovitz, and Adam "MCA" Yauch.	2 (2008, 2011)	Chuck D^{[N2]} and LL Cool J^{[N2]}
2012	Gene Vincent in 1957	The Blue Caps^{[N1]}	Backing band for Gene Vincent. Inducted: Tommy Facenda, Cliff Gallup, Dickie Harrell, Bobby Jones, Johnny Meeks, Jack Neal, Paul Peek, and Willie Williams.	N/A	Smokey Robinson^{[N3]}
2012		The Comets^{[N1]}	Backing band for Bill Haley. Inducted: Joey Ambrose, Franny Beecher, Danny Cedrone, Johnny Grande, Ralph Jones, Marshall Lytle, Rudy Pompilli, Al Rex, Dick Richards, and Billy Williamson.	N/A	Smokey Robinson^{[N3]}
2012		The Crickets^{[N1]}	Backing band for Buddy Holly. Inducted: Jerry Allison, Sonny Curtis, Joe B. Mauldin, and Niki Sullivan.	N/A	Smokey Robinson^{[N3]}
2012	Photo of Donovan performing on The Smother Brothers television program.	Donovan		1 (2011)	John Mellencamp^{[N3]}
2012		The Famous Flames^{[N1]}	Backing vocal group for James Brown. Inducted: Bobby Bennett, Bobby Byrd, Lloyd Stallworth, and Johnny Terry.	N/A	Smokey Robinson^{[N3]}
2012		Guns N' Roses	Steven Adler, Duff McKagan, Dizzy Reed, Axl Rose, Slash, Matt Sorum, and Izzy Stradlin.	First nomination; First year of eligibility	Green Day^{[N2]}
2012		The Midnighters^{[N1]}	Backing vocal group for Hank Ballard. Inducted: Henry Booth, Billy Davis, Cal Green, Arthur Porter, Lawson Smith, Charles Sutton, Norman Thrasher, and Sonny Woods.	N/A	Smokey Robinson^{[N3]}
2012		The Miracles^{[N1]}	Backing vocal group for Smokey Robinson. Inducted: Claudette Rogers, Bobby Rogers, Ronald White, Marv Tarplin, and Pete Moore.	N/A	Smokey Robinson^{[N3]}
2012		Laura Nyro		2 (2010, 2011)	Bette Midler
2012		Red Hot Chili Peppers	Flea, John Frusciante, Jack Irons, Anthony Kiedis, Josh Klinghoffer, Cliff Martinez, Hillel Slovak, and Chad Smith.	1 (2010)	Chris Rock
2012		The Small Faces / Faces	Kenney Jones, Ronnie Lane, Ian McLagan, Steve Marriott, Rod Stewart, and Ronnie Wood.	First nomination	Steven Van Zandt^{[N2]}
2013	Heart performs for service members during the 2010 VH1 Divas Salute the Troops concert at Marine Corps Air Station Miramar, Dec. 3.	Heart	Michael DeRosier, Roger Fisher, Steve Fossen, Howard Leese, Ann Wilson, and Nancy Wilson.	1 (2012)	Chris Cornell^{[N2]}
2013	King performing in 1978	Albert King		First nomination	John Mayer
2013	Newman in a recording studio, 1972	Randy Newman		1 (2005)	Don Henley^{[N3]}
2013		Public Enemy	Flavor Flav, Professor Griff, Terminator X, and Chuck D.	First nomination; First year of eligibility	Harry Belafonte^{[N2]} and Spike Lee
2013		Rush	Geddy Lee, Alex Lifeson, and Neil Peart.	First nomination	Dave Grohl^{[N2]} and Taylor Hawkins^{[N2]}
2013	Summer in 1977	Donna Summer		4 (2008, 2010, 2011, 2012)	Kelly Rowland
2014		Peter Gabriel		First nomination	Chris Martin
2014	Daryl Hall (left) and John Oates (right), 1980	Hall & Oates	Daryl Hall and John Oates.	First nomination	Questlove
2014	Kiss in 1977, clockwise from the top: Gene Simmons, Peter Criss, Paul Stanley, and Ace Frehley	Kiss	Peter Criss, Ace Frehley, Gene Simmons, and Paul Stanley.	1 (2010)	Tom Morello^{[N2]}
2014		Nirvana	Kurt Cobain, Dave Grohl, and Krist Novoselic.	First nomination; First year of eligibility	Michael Stipe^{[N3]}
2014	Ronstadt in 1976	Linda Ronstadt		First nomination	Glenn Frey^{[N3]}
2014	Cat Stevens aka Yusuf Islam in a commercial in 1972	Cat Stevens		1 (2006)	Art Garfunkel^{[N3]}
2015		The Paul Butterfield Blues Band	Paul Butterfield, Mike Bloomfield, Elvin Bishop, Mark Naftalin, Jerome Arnold, Billy Davenport, and Sam Lay.	3 (2006, 2013, 2014)	Peter Wolf
2015	Lead Singer Joan Jett performing with The Blackhearts in Norway, 1980s	Joan Jett & the Blackhearts	Joan Jett, Kenny Laguna, Gary Ryan, Lee Crystal, and Ricky Byrd.^{[N4]}	2 (2012, 2013)	Miley Cyrus
2015		Green Day	Billie Joe Armstrong, Tré Cool, and Mike Dirnt.	First nomination; First year of eligibility	Fall Out Boy
2015		Lou Reed		2 (2000, 2001)	Patti Smith^{[N3]}
2015		Stevie Ray Vaughan and Double Trouble	Stevie Ray Vaughan, Chris Layton, Tommy Shannon, and Reese Wynans.	First nomination	John Mayer
2015	Withers in 1976	Bill Withers		First nomination	Stevie Wonder^{[N3]}
2016	Rick Nielsen and Tom Petersson of Cheap Trick performing in New Haven, Connecticut (1977)	Cheap Trick	Bun E. Carlos, Rick Nielsen, Tom Petersson, and Robin Zander.	First nomination	Kid Rock
2016		Chicago	Peter Cetera, Terry Kath, Robert Lamm, Lee Loughnane, James Pankow, Walter Parazaider, and Danny Seraphine.	First nomination	Rob Thomas
2016	Deep Purple in 1971	Deep Purple	Ritchie Blackmore, David Coverdale, Rod Evans, Ian Gillan, Roger Glover, Glenn Hughes, Jon Lord, and Ian Paice.	2 (2013, 2014)	Lars Ulrich^{[N3]}
2016		N.W.A	DJ Yella, Ice Cube, Dr. Dre, Eazy-E, and MC Ren.	3 (2013, 2014, 2015)	Kendrick Lamar
2016	Steve Miller performs in 1977	Steve Miller		First nomination	The Black Keys
2017	Joan Baez in 1963.	Joan Baez		First nomination	Jackson Browne^{[N3]}
2017	ELO in 1972.	Electric Light Orchestra	Bev Bevan, Jeff Lynne, Richard Tandy, and Roy Wood.	First nomination	Dhani Harrison
2017	Journey in 2002.	Journey	Jonathan Cain, Aynsley Dunbar, Steve Perry, Gregg Rolie, Neal Schon, Steve Smith, and Ross Valory.	First nomination	Pat Monahan
2017	Pearl Jam in 2016.	Pearl Jam	Jeff Ament, Matt Cameron, Stone Gossard, Dave Krusen, Mike McCready, and Eddie Vedder.	First nomination; First year of eligibility	David Letterman
2017		Tupac Shakur		First nomination; First year of eligibility	Snoop Dogg
2017	Yes in 1977.	Yes	Jon Anderson, Bill Bruford, Steve Howe, Tony Kaye, Trevor Rabin, Chris Squire, Rick Wakeman, and Alan White.	2 (2014, 2016)	Geddy Lee^{[N3]} and Alex Lifeson^{[N3]}
2018	Bon Jovi in Montreal in 2007 during the Lost Highway Tour.	Bon Jovi	Jon Bon Jovi, David Bryan, Hugh McDonald, Richie Sambora, Alec John Such, and Tico Torres.	1 (2011)	Howard Stern
2018		The Cars	Elliot Easton, Greg Hawkes, David Robinson, Ric Ocasek, and Benjamin Orr.	2 (2016, 2017)	Brandon Flowers
2018	Dire Straits in Drammenshallen, Norway, 1985	Dire Straits	Alan Clark, Guy Fletcher, John Illsley, David Knopfler, Mark Knopfler, and Pick Withers.	First nomination	John Illsley^{[N5]}
2018	The Moody Blues in 1970 at Amsterdam Airport Schiphol.	The Moody Blues	Graeme Edge, Justin Hayward, Denny Laine, John Lodge, Mike Pinder, and Ray Thomas.	First nomination	Ann Wilson^{[N3]}
2018	Simone in 1975	Nina Simone		First nomination	Mary J. Blige^{[N2]}
2019	The Cure live in Singapore	The Cure	Perry Bamonte, Jason Cooper, Michael Dempsey, Reeves Gabrels, Simon Gallup, Roger O'Donnell, Robert Smith, Porl Thompson, Lol Tolhurst, and Boris Williams.	1 (2012)	Trent Reznor^{[N2]}
2019	Def Leppard in 2018	Def Leppard	Rick Allen, Vivian Campbell, Phil Collen, Steve Clark, Joe Elliott, Rick Savage, and Pete Willis.	First nomination	Brian May^{[N3]}
2019	Janet Jackson performing on her Unbreakable World Tour in San Francisco, California, October 14, 2015	Janet Jackson		2 (2016, 2017)	Janelle Monáe
2019	Stevie Nicks in 2017	Stevie Nicks		First nomination	Harry Styles
2019	Radiohead in 2018	Radiohead	Colin Greenwood, Jonny Greenwood, Ed O'Brien, Philip Selway, and Thom Yorke.	1 (2018)	David Byrne^{[N3]}
2019	Roxy Music on TopPop in 1973	Roxy Music	Brian Eno, Bryan Ferry, Eddie Jobson, Andy Mackay, Phil Manzanera, Graham Simpson, and Paul Thompson.^{[N6]}	First nomination	Simon Le Bon^{[N2]} and John Taylor^{[N2]}
2019		The Zombies	Rod Argent, Paul Atkinson, Colin Blunstone, Hugh Grundy, and Chris White.	3 (2014, 2017, 2018)	Susanna Hoffs
2020	Depeche Mode, 2006	Depeche Mode	Vince Clarke, Andy Fletcher, Dave Gahan, Martin Gore, and Alan Wilder.	2 (2017, 2018)	Charlize Theron
2020	The Doobie Brothers in 1974	The Doobie Brothers	Jeff "Skunk" Baxter, John Hartman, Michael Hossack, Tom Johnston, Keith Knudsen, Michael McDonald, John McFee, Tiran Porter, and Patrick Simmons.	First nomination	Luke Bryan
2020	Whitney Houston in 1991	Whitney Houston		First nomination	Alicia Keys
2020	NIN at Lollapalooza in 1991	Nine Inch Nails	Alessandro Cortini, Robin Finck, Danny Lohner, Trent Reznor, Atticus Ross, Ilan Rubin, and Chris Vrenna.	2 (2015, 2016)	Iggy Pop^{[N3]}
2020		The Notorious B.I.G.		First nomination; First year of eligibility	Sean Combs
2020	Photo of Marc Bolan (T Rex) from a 1973 ABC Television In Concert performance.	T. Rex	Marc Bolan, Steve Currie, Mickey Finn, and Bill Legend.	First nomination	Ringo Starr^{[N3]}
2021	Foo Fighters after performing in June 2018. From left to right: Chris Shiflett, Taylor Hawkins, Dave Grohl, Nate Mendel, Rami Jaffee, and Pat Smear.	Foo Fighters	Dave Grohl, Taylor Hawkins, Rami Jaffee, Nate Mendel, Chris Shiflett, and Pat Smear.	First nomination; First year of eligibility	Paul McCartney^{[N3]}
2021	Go-Go's in 1981	The Go-Go's	Charlotte Caffey, Belinda Carlisle, Gina Schock, Kathy Valentine, and Jane Wiedlin.	First nomination	Drew Barrymore
2021	Jay-Z 2011	Jay-Z		First nomination; First year of eligibility	Dave Chappelle
2021	Carole King 2002	Carole King		1 (1989)	Taylor Swift
2021	Todd Rundgren 1978	Todd Rundgren		2 (2019, 2020)	Patti Smith^{[N3]}
2021	Tina Turner	Tina Turner		1 (1987)	Angela Bassett
2022		Pat Benatar and Neil Giraldo	Pat Benatar and Neil Giraldo.^{[N7]}	1 (2020)	Sheryl Crow^{[N2]}
2022		Duran Duran	Warren Cuccurullo, Simon Le Bon, Nick Rhodes, Andy Taylor, John Taylor, and Roger Taylor.	First nomination	Robert Downey Jr.
2022		Eminem		First nomination; First year of eligibility	Dr. Dre^{[N3]}
2022		Eurythmics	Annie Lennox and Dave Stewart.	1 (2018)	The Edge^{[N3]}
2022		Dolly Parton		First nomination	Pink
2022		Lionel Richie		First nomination	Lenny Kravitz
2022		Carly Simon		First nomination	Sara Bareilles
2023		Kate Bush		3 (2018, 2021, 2022)	Big Boi^{[N2]}
2023		Sheryl Crow		First nomination	Laura Dern
2023		Missy Elliott		First nomination; First year of eligibility	Queen Latifah
2023		George Michael		First nomination	Andrew Ridgeley
2023		Willie Nelson		First nomination	Dave Matthews^{[N2]}
2023		Rage Against the Machine	Tim Commerford, Zack de la Rocha, Tom Morello, and Brad Wilk.	4 (2018, 2019, 2021, 2022)	Ice-T
2023		The Spinners	John Edwards, Henry Fambrough, Billy Henderson, Pervis Jackson, Bobby Smith, and Philippé Wynne.	3 (2012, 2015, 2016)	None^{[N8]}
2024		Mary J. Blige		1 (2021)	Dr. Dre^{[N3]} and Method Man
2024		Cher		First nomination	Zendaya
2024		Dave Matthews Band	Carter Beauford, Jeff Coffin, Stefan Lessard, Dave Matthews, LeRoi Moore, Tim Reynolds, Rashawn Ross, Buddy Strong, and Boyd Tinsley.	1 (2020)	Julia Roberts
2024		Foreigner	Dennis Elliott, Ed Gagliardi, Lou Gramm, Al Greenwood, Mick Jones, Ian McDonald, and Rick Wills.	First nomination	Sammy Hagar^{[N3]}
2024		Peter Frampton		First nomination	Roger Daltrey^{[N3]}
2024		Kool & the Gang	Robert "Kool" Bell, Ronald Bell, George Brown, Robert "Spike" Mickens, Claydes Charles Smith, James "J.T." Taylor, Dennis "Dee Tee" Thomas, and Ricky Westfield.	First nomination	Chuck D^{[N3]}
2024		Ozzy Osbourne		First nomination	Jack Black
2024		A Tribe Called Quest	Ali Shaheed Muhammad, Phife Dawg, Q-Tip, and Jarobi White.	2 (2022, 2023)	Dave Chappelle
2025		Bad Company	Boz Burrell, Simon Kirke, Mick Ralphs, and Paul Rodgers.	First nomination	Mick Fleetwood^{[N3]}
2025		Chubby Checker		First nomination	None^{[N9]}
2025		Joe Cocker		First nomination	Bryan Adams
2025		Cyndi Lauper		1 (2023)	Chappell Roan
2025		Outkast	André 3000 and Big Boi.	First nomination	Donald Glover
2025		Soundgarden	Matt Cameron, Chris Cornell, Ben Shepherd, Kim Thayil, and Hiro Yamamoto.	2 (2020, 2023)	Jim Carrey
2025		The White Stripes	Jack White and Meg White.	1 (2023)	Iggy Pop^{[N3]}
2026		Phil Collins		First nomination	Travis Barker
2026		Billy Idol	Billy Idol and Steve Stevens.^{[N10]}	1 (2025)	Gwen Stefani and Tony Kanal
2026		Iron Maiden	Blaze Bayley, Clive Burr, Paul Di'Anno, Bruce Dickinson, Janick Gers, Steve Harris, Nicko McBrain, Dave Murray, Adrian Smith, and Dennis Stratton.	2 (2021, 2023)	Jack Black
2026		Joy Division / New Order	Ian Curtis, Gillian Gilbert, Peter Hook, Stephen Morris, and Bernard Sumner.	2 (2023, 2025)	Trent Reznor^{[N3]}
2026		Oasis	Gem Archer, Paul Arthurs, Andy Bell, Liam Gallagher, Noel Gallagher, Tony McCarroll, Paul McGuigan, and Alan White.	2 (2024, 2025)	Bob Odenkirk
2026		Sade	Sade Adu, Paul Denman, Andrew Hale, and Stuart Matthewman.	1 (2024)	Andra Day
2026		Luther Vandross		First nomination	Oprah Winfrey
2026		Wu-Tang Clan	Cappadonna, Ghostface Killah, Inspectah Deck, GZA, Masta Killa, Method Man, Ol' Dirty Bastard, Raekwon, RZA, and U-God.	First nomination	Chris Rock

Note 1. These backing bands were inducted by a separate committee, and not by the ballot voting used for all other performer inductees.

Note 2. This artist was later inducted into the Rock and Roll Hall of Fame after inducting someone else.

Note 3. This artist was already a member of the Rock and Roll Hall of Fame when they inducted someone else.

Note 4. Kenny Laguna was not initially listed among the members of Joan Jett & the Blackhearts who were inducted in 2015, but he spoke during their acceptance speech, and his name was later added to the band's plaque at the museum.

Note 5. Dire Straits were the first artist in the hall's history to not have an official induction speaker. Band member John Illsley did the induction speech himself.

Note 6. John Gustafson was originally included among the list of inducted members for Roxy Music; however, his name was dropped in the final list.

Note 7. Although Pat Benatar is a solo artist, her husband, guitarist and primary musical partner Neil Giraldo was also included as part of her induction.

Note 8. There was no induction speaker for the Spinners. Instead, New Edition performed a medley of three of their songs.

Note 9. There was no induction speaker for Chubby Checker. Instead, Checker accepted his induction on June 27, 2025 at his concert in Des Plaines, Illinois. A video of his acceptance speech from the concert was shown at the 2025 induction ceremony.

Note 10. Although Billy Idol is a solo artist, his guitarist Steve Stevens was also included as part of his induction.

=== Early influence ===
This category recognizes artists whose music and performance style influenced the evolution of rock and roll. Originally honoring "Early" artists who predated the birth of rock & roll, the category celebrates those with a profound impact on music who inspired rock's leading artists. Inductees are selected by a committee. In 2023, the "Early Influence" category was renamed "Musical Influence". The category reverted to the "Early Influence" name in 2026.

Year	Image	Name	Inducted members	Inducted by
1986		Jimmie Rodgers		Jerry Wexler
1986		Jimmy Yancey		Ahmet Ertegun
1986		Robert Johnson		Robert Palmer
1987		Louis Jordan		Seymour Stein
1987		T-Bone Walker		Seymour Stein
1987		Hank Williams		Seymour Stein
1988		Woody Guthrie		Neil Young
1988		Lead Belly		Pete Seeger
1988		Les Paul		Jeff Beck
1989		The Ink Spots	Bill Kenny, Charlie Fuqua, Deek Watson, Jerry Daniels, and Orville "Hoppy" Jones.	Bobby McFerrin
1989		Bessie Smith		Anita Baker
1989		The Soul Stirrers	Roy Crain Sr., R. H. Harris, Jesse Farley, and E. A. Rundless.	Al Green
1990		Louis Armstrong		Rickie Lee Jones
1990		Charlie Christian		Vernon Reid
1990		Ma Rainey		Bonnie Raitt
1991		Howlin' Wolf		Robert Cray
1992		Elmore James		Robbie Robertson
1992		Professor Longhair		Aaron Neville
1993		Dinah Washington		Natalie Cole
1994		Willie Dixon		Chuck Berry
1995		The Orioles	Sonny Til, Tommy Gaither, George Nelson, Johnny Reed, and Alexander Sharp.	Deborah Chessler and Seymour Stein
1996		Pete Seeger		Arlo Guthrie and Harry Belafonte
1997		Mahalia Jackson		Mavis Staples
1997		Bill Monroe		Ricky Skaggs and Emmylou Harris
1998		Jelly Roll Morton		Ahmet Ertegun
1999		Bob Wills & His Texas Playboys	Bob Wills, Tommy Duncan, Leon McAuliffe, Johnny Gimble, Joe "Jody" Holley, Tiny Moore, Herb Remington, Eldon Shamblin, and Al Stricklin.	Chris Isaak
1999		Charles Brown		Bonnie Raitt
2000		Nat King Cole		Ray Charles
2000		Billie Holiday		Diana Ross
2009		Wanda Jackson^{[A]}		Rosanne Cash
2012		Freddie King^{[A]}		Billy Gibbons and Dusty Hill
2015		The "5" Royales^{[A]}	John L. Tanner, Eugene Tanner, James E. Moore, Obadiah H. Carter, and Lowman Pauling, Jr.	Steve Cropper
2018		Sister Rosetta Tharpe^{[A]}		Brittany Howard
2021		Kraftwerk^{[A]}	Ralf Hütter, Florian Schneider, Karl Bartos, and Wolfgang Flür.	Pharrell Williams
2021		Charley Patton		Gary Clark Jr.
2021		Gil Scott-Heron		Common
2022		Harry Belafonte		
2022		Elizabeth Cotten		
2023		DJ Kool Herc		LL Cool J
2023		Link Wray^{[A]}		Jimmy Page
2024		Alexis Korner		
2024		John Mayall		
2024		Big Mama Thornton		
2025		Salt-N-Pepa	Pepa, Salt, and DJ Spinderella.	Missy Elliott
2025		Warren Zevon^{[A]}		David Letterman
2026		Celia Cruz		
2026		Fela Kuti^{[A]}		
2026		Queen Latifah		Megan Thee Stallion
2026		MC Lyte		Remy Ma
2026		Gram Parsons^{[A]}		

A. Previously nominated as a performer: Wanda Jackson in 2005 and 2009; Freddie King in 2012; The "5" Royales in 2002 and 2004; Sister Rosetta Tharpe in 2018; Kraftwerk in 2003, 2013, 2015, 2017, 2019, and 2020; Link Wray in 2014 and 2018; Warren Zevon in 2023; Fela Kuti in 2021 and 2022; and Gram Parsons in 2002, 2004, and 2005.

=== Non-performers (Ahmet Ertegun Award) ===
The non-performer category honors "songwriters, producers, disc jockeys, record executives, journalists and other industry professionals who have had a major influence on the development of rock and roll". Several of the inductees in this category were in fact prominent performers as well. The inductees in this category are selected by the same committee that chooses the early influences. In 2008, this category was renamed the "Ahmet Ertegun Award".

Year	Image	Name	Inducted by
1986		Alan Freed	Norm N. Nite and Scott Muni
1986		John Hammond	Ahmet Ertegun
1986		Sam Phillips	Jerry Lee Lewis
1987		Leonard Chess	Ewart Abner
1987		Ahmet Ertegun	Jann Wenner and Walter Yetnikoff
1987		Jerry Leiber and Mike Stoller	Brian Wilson
1987		Jerry Wexler	Jann Wenner
1988		Berry Gordy, Jr.	Ahmet Ertegun
1989		Phil Spector	Tina Turner
1990		Gerry Goffin and Carole King	Ben E. King
1990		Holland–Dozier–Holland	Diana Ross
1991		Dave Bartholomew	The Neville Brothers
1991		Ralph Bass	Hank Ballard
1991		Nesuhi Ertegun	Quincy Jones
1992		Leo Fender	Keith Richards
1992		Bill Graham	Carlos Santana
1992		Doc Pomus	Phil Spector
1993		Dick Clark	Dion DiMucci
1993		Milt Gabler	Billy Crystal
1994		Johnny Otis	Etta James
1995		Paul Ackerman	Ahmet Ertegun
1996		Tom Donahue	Bob Krasnow
1997		Syd Nathan	Seymour Stein
1998		Allen Toussaint	Robbie Robertson
1999		George Martin	Jimmy Iovine
2000		Clive Davis	Patti Smith
2001		Chris Blackwell	Bono
2002		Jim Stewart	Sam Moore and Steve Cropper
2003		Mo Ostin	Lorne Michaels, Paul Simon, and Neil Young
2004		Jann Wenner	Mick Jagger
2005		Frank Barsalona	Steven Van Zandt
2005		Seymour Stein	Ice-T
2006		Herb Alpert and Jerry Moss	Sting
2008		Kenny Gamble and Leon Huff	Jerry Butler
2010		David Geffen	Jackson Browne
2010		Otis Blackwell	Carole King
2010		Jeff Barry and Ellie Greenwich	Carole King
2010		Mort Shuman	Carole King
2010		Jesse Stone	Carole King
2010		Barry Mann and Cynthia Weil	Carole King
2011		Jac Holzman	John Densmore
2011		Art Rupe	Lloyd Price
2012		Don Kirshner	Carole King
2013		Lou Adler	Cheech & Chong
2013		Quincy Jones	Oprah Winfrey
2014		Brian Epstein	Peter Asher
2014		Andrew Loog Oldham	Peter Asher
2016		Bert Berns	Steven Van Zandt
2020		Irving Azoff	Don Henley
2020		Jon Landau	Bruce Springsteen
2021		Clarence Avant	Lionel Richie
2022		Allen Grubman	John Mellencamp
2022		Jimmy Iovine	Bruce Springsteen
2022		Sylvia Robinson	
2023		Don Cornelius	
2024		Suzanne de Passe	
2025		Lenny Waronker	
2026		Ed Sullivan	

=== Award for Musical Excellence ===
Established in 2000 as "Sidemen", the category "honors those musicians, producers and others who have spent their careers out of the spotlight working with major artists on various parts of their recording and live careers". A separate committee, composed mainly of producers, chooses the inductees. In 2010, the category was renamed to the "Award for Musical Excellence". According to Joel Peresman, the president of the Rock and Roll Hall of Fame Foundation, "This award gives us flexibility to dive into some things and recognize some people who might not ordinarily get recognized."

Year	Image	Name	Inducted Members	Inducted by
2000		Hal Blaine		Jerry Leiber and Mike Stoller
2000		King Curtis^{[A]}		Jerry Leiber and Mike Stoller
2000		James Jamerson		Jerry Leiber and Mike Stoller
2000		Scotty Moore		Jerry Leiber and Mike Stoller
2000		Earl Palmer		Jerry Leiber and Mike Stoller
2001		James Burton		Keith Richards
2001		Johnnie Johnson		Keith Richards
2002		Chet Atkins		Marty Stuart and Brian Setzer
2003		Benny Benjamin		Paul Shaffer
2003		Floyd Cramer		Paul Shaffer
2003		Steve Douglas		Paul Shaffer
2008		Little Walter		Ben Harper
2009		Bill Black		Garry Tallent
2009		D. J. Fontana		Max Weinberg
2009		Spooner Oldham		Paul Shaffer
2011		Leon Russell		Elton John
2012		Cosimo Matassa		Robbie Robertson
2012		Tom Dowd		Robbie Robertson
2012		Glyn Johns		Robbie Robertson
2014		E Street Band	Garry Tallent, Roy Bittan, Max Weinberg, Steven Van Zandt, Nils Lofgren, Patti Scialfa, Clarence Clemons, Danny Federici, Vini Lopez, and David Sancious.	Bruce Springsteen
2015		Ringo Starr		Paul McCartney
2017		Nile Rodgers^{[A]}		Pharrell Williams
2021		LL Cool J^{[A]}		Dr. Dre
2021		Billy Preston		Ringo Starr
2021		Randy Rhoads		Tom Morello
2022		Jimmy Jam and Terry Lewis		Janet Jackson
2022		Judas Priest^{[A]}	Les Binks, K. K. Downing, Rob Halford, Ian Hill, Dave Holland, Glenn Tipton, and Scott Travis.	Alice Cooper
2023		Chaka Khan^{[A]}		Jazmine Sullivan
2023		Al Kooper		
2023		Bernie Taupin		Elton John
2024		Jimmy Buffett		James Taylor
2024		MC5^{[A]}	Michael Davis, Wayne Kramer, Fred "Sonic" Smith, Dennis Thompson, and Rob Tyner.	Tom Morello
2024		Dionne Warwick^{[A]}		Teyana Taylor
2024		Norman Whitfield		
2025		Thom Bell		
2025		Nicky Hopkins		
2025		Carol Kaye		
2026		Linda Creed		
2026		Arif Mardin		
2026		Jimmy Miller		
2026		Rick Rubin		Neil Young^{[N3]}

A. Previously nominated in the performers category: King Curtis in 1986, 1987, 1988, 1989, 1990, and 1996; LL Cool J in 2010, 2011, 2014, 2018, 2019, and 2021; Judas Priest in 2018, 2020, and 2022; Chaka Khan in 2016, 2017, and 2021; MC5 in 2003, 2017, 2018, 2019, 2020, and 2022; and Dionne Warwick in 2021 and 2022.

=== Singles ===
At the 2018 ceremony, a new induction category for singles was announced by Steven Van Zandt. According to Van Zandt, the category is "a recognition of the excellence of the singles that shaped rock 'n' roll, kind of a rock 'n' roll jukebox, records by artists not in the Rock Hall – which is not to say these artists will never be in the Rock Hall. They just are not in the Rock Hall at the moment." However, The Isley Brothers, whose song "Twist and Shout" was inducted in 2019, were inducted into the Rock and Roll Hall of Fame as performers in 1992. Link Wray and Chubby Checker, whose songs were honored in this category, were later inducted into the Hall: Wray in 2023 through the Musical Influence category, and Checker in 2025 in the main Performers category.

Year	Artist	Song (Year)	Record label
2018	Jackie Brenston and his Delta Cats	"Rocket 88" (1951)	Chess Records
2018	Link Wray	"Rumble" (1958)	Cadence Records
2018	Chubby Checker	"The Twist" (1960)	Parkway Records
2018	The Kingsmen	"Louie Louie" (1963)	Jerden Records
2018	Procol Harum	"A Whiter Shade of Pale" (1967)	Deram Records
2018	Steppenwolf	"Born to Be Wild" (1968)	Dunhill Records
2019	The Chantels	"Maybe" (1957)	End Records
2019	The Champs	"Tequila" (1958)	Challenge Records
2019	Barrett Strong	"Money (That's What I Want)" (1959)	Tamla Records
2019	The Isley Brothers	"Twist and Shout" (1962)	Wand Records
2019	The Shangri-Las	"Leader of the Pack" (1964)	Red Bird Records
2019	The Shadows of Knight	"Gloria" (1965)	Dunwich Records
2020	Irma Thomas	"Time Is on My Side" (1964)	Imperial Records
2020	Junior Walker & the All-Stars	"Shotgun" (1965)	Motown Records
2020	Sam the Sham & the Pharaohs	"Wooly Bully" (1965)	MGM Records
2020	The Troggs	"Wild Thing" (1966)	Fontana Records
2020	The Box Tops	"The Letter" (1967)	Mala Records

== Individuals inducted twice or more ==
As of 2026, twenty-nine performers have been inducted twice or more; sixteen have been recognized as a solo artist and with a duo or group, and eleven have been inducted with two separate groups. Eric Clapton is the only person to be inducted three times: as a solo artist, with Cream, and with the Yardbirds. Clyde McPhatter was the first to ever be inducted twice and is one of three artists to be inducted first as a solo artist and then as a member of a group, the other artists being Neil Young and Rod Stewart. Stephen Stills is the only artist to be inducted twice in the same year.

Crosby, Stills & Nash and the Beatles are the only two bands whose members were also each inducted separately, with other acts or as solo artists. In addition to their 1997 induction with CSN, David Crosby was inducted with the Byrds in 1991, Stephen Stills with Buffalo Springfield in 1997, and Graham Nash with the Hollies in 2010. After their 1988 induction with the Beatles, John Lennon, Paul McCartney, and George Harrison were inducted as solo artists in the main performer category in 1994, 1999, and 2004, respectively, while Ringo Starr was inducted in the Award for Musical Excellence category in 2015.

There are several performers who were inducted with one (or more) of the bands they played for, but were not inducted as members of one (or more) other bands. For example, Neil Young was inducted with Buffalo Springfield and as a solo artist, but was left out when Crosby, Stills & Nash were inducted.

In 2019, Stevie Nicks became the first woman to be inducted twice, after having been inducted with Fleetwood Mac in 1998. She was later joined by Carole King and Tina Turner. In 2021, Carole King was the first person to be inducted as both a performer and a non-performer.

John Lennon and Dave Grohl are the only two multiple inductees who were inducted in their first year of eligibility on both inductions.

	Name	First	Year	Second	Year	Third	Year
	Jeff Beck	The Yardbirds	1992	Solo career	2009	—	—
	Matt Cameron	Pearl Jam	2017	Soundgarden	2025	—	—
	Johnny Carter	The Flamingos	2001	The Dells	2004	—	—
	Eric Clapton	The Yardbirds	1992	Cream	1993	Solo career	2000
	Phil Collins	Genesis	2010	Solo career	2026	—	—
	David Crosby	The Byrds	1991	Crosby, Stills & Nash	1997	—	—
	Peter Gabriel	Genesis	2010	Solo career	2014	—	—
	Dave Grohl	Nirvana	2014	Foo Fighters	2021	—	—
	George Harrison	The Beatles	1988	Solo career	2004	—	—
	Michael Jackson	The Jackson Five	1997	Solo career	2001	—	—
	Carole King	Non-performer (with Gerry Goffin)	1990	Solo career	2021	—	—
	John Lennon	The Beatles	1988	Solo career	1994	—	—
	Curtis Mayfield	The Impressions	1991	Solo career	1999	—	—
	Paul McCartney	The Beatles	1988	Solo career	1999	—	—
	Clyde McPhatter	Solo career	1987	The Drifters	1988	—	—
	Graham Nash	Crosby, Stills & Nash	1997	The Hollies	2010	—	—
	Stevie Nicks	Fleetwood Mac	1998	Solo career	2019	—	—
	Ozzy Osbourne	Black Sabbath	2006	Solo career	2024	—	—
	Jimmy Page	The Yardbirds	1992	Led Zeppelin	1995	—	—
	Lou Reed	The Velvet Underground	1996	Solo career	2015	—	—
	Gregg Rolie	Santana	1998	Journey	2017	—	—
	Paul Simon	Simon & Garfunkel	1990	Solo career	2001	—	—
	Ringo Starr	The Beatles	1988	Award for Musical Excellence	2015	—	—
	Rod Stewart	Solo career	1994	Faces	2012	—	—
	Stephen Stills	Buffalo Springfield	1997	Crosby, Stills & Nash	1997	—	—
	Sammy Strain	The O'Jays	2005	Little Anthony & The Imperials	2009	—	—
Tina Turner	Tina Turner	Ike & Tina Turner	1991	Solo career	2021	—	—
	Ronnie Wood	The Rolling Stones	1989	Faces	2012	—	—
	Neil Young	Solo career	1995	Buffalo Springfield	1997	—	—

== Previously nominated artists ==
The following is a complete list of artists that have been nominated at least once for the Rock and Roll Hall of Fame, but have yet to be selected as an inductee.

Name	Image	Year(s) nominated	NN	Reference
Johnny Ace		1986, 1987	2	
Bad Brains		2017	1	
Afrika Bambaataa		2008	1	
Beck		2022	1	
The Black Crowes		2025, 2026	2	
Jeff Buckley		2026	1	
Mariah Carey		2024, 2025, 2026	3	
The Chantels		2002, 2010	2	
Chic (Note: Band member Nile Rodgers was inducted in the Award for Musical Excellence category in 2017.)		2003, 2006, 2007, 2008, 2009, 2011, 2013, 2014, 2015, 2016, 2017	11	
Devo		2019, 2021, 2022	3	
The Dominoes (Note: Band members Clyde McPhatter and Jackie Wilson were both inducted as solo artists in 1987, and McPhatter was inducted a second time as a member of the Drifters in 1988.)		1997	1	
Eric B. & Rakim		2012, 2024	2	
Melissa Etheridge		2026	1	
Lauryn Hill		2026	1	
INXS		2026	1	
The J.B.'s (Note: Band member Bootsy Collins was inducted as a member of Parliament-Funkadelic in 1997.)		2016	1	
The J. Geils Band		2005, 2006, 2011, 2017, 2018	5	
Jane's Addiction		2017, 2024	2	
Ben E. King (Note: In addition to this nomination for his solo career, Ben E. King was inducted as a member of The Drifters in 1988.)		1986, 1987, 1988	3	
Lenny Kravitz		2024	1	
Los Lobos		2016	1	
Maná		2025	1	
The Marvelettes		2013, 2015	2	
The Meters		1997, 2013, 2014, 2018	4	
Motörhead		2020	1	
New Edition		2026	1	
New York Dolls		2001, 2021, 2022	3	
Sinéad O'Connor		2024	1	
Esther Phillips		1986, 1987	2	
Phish		2025	1	
Pink		2026	1	
John Prine		2019	1	
Procol Harum		2013	1	
The Replacements		2014	1	
Rufus (Note: Band member Chaka Khan was inducted in the Award for Musical Excellence category for her solo career in 2023.)		2012, 2018, 2019, 2020	4	
Shakira		2026	1	
Sir Douglas Quintet		2006	1	
The Smiths		2015, 2016	2	
Steppenwolf		2017	1	
Sting (Note: In addition to this nomination for his solo career, Sting was inducted as a member of The Police in 2003.)		2015	1	
Joe Tex		1998, 2006, 2007, 2017	4	
Thin Lizzy		2020	1	
Conway Twitty		2005	1	
War (Note: Band member Eric Burdon was inducted as a member of The Animals in 1994.)		2009, 2012, 2015	3	
Mary Wells		1987	1	
Chuck Willis		1986, 1987, 1988, 1989, 1990, 2011	6	
Steve Winwood (Note: In addition to this nomination for his solo career, Steve Winwood was inducted as a member of Traffic in 2004)		2003	1	

== Inductees in other halls of fame ==
=== DownBeat Jazz Hall of Fame ===
As of 2024, there are 15 members of the Rock and Roll Hall of Fame who also have been inducted into the DownBeat Jazz Hall of Fame.

Inductee	Year inducted into Rock and Roll Hall of Fame	Year inducted into DownBeat Jazz Hall of Fame	Notes
Ray Charles	1986	2018	Only individual in the Jazz, Rock and Roll, and Country halls of fame.
Robert Johnson	1986	2013	Early influences category.
Bessie Smith	1986	1967	First woman inducted into both halls. Early influences category.
B.B. King	1987	2014	
Muddy Waters	1987	2015	
Louis Armstrong	1990	1952	Along with Charlie Christian, first jazz artist inducted into the Rock and Roll Hall of Fame. Early influences category.
Charlie Christian	1990	1966	Along with Louis Armstrong, first jazz artist inducted into the Rock and Roll Hall of Fame. Early influences category.
Jimi Hendrix	1992	1970	First rock artist inducted into the DownBeat Jazz Hall of Fame.
Dinah Washington	1993	2014	Early influences category.
Frank Zappa	1995	1994	
Jelly Roll Morton	1998	1963	Early influences category.
Nat King Cole	2000	1997	Early influences category.
Billie Holiday	2000	1961	Early influences category.
Miles Davis	2006	1962	
Nina Simone	2018	2019	

=== Country Music Hall of Fame ===
As of 2024, there are 18 members of the Rock and Roll Hall of Fame also inducted into the Country Music Hall of Fame and Museum.

Inductee	Year inducted into Rock and Roll Hall of Fame	Year inducted into Country Music Hall of Fame	Notes
Ray Charles	1986	2021	Only African-American inducted into both Halls of Fame; only individual in the Jazz, Rock and Roll, and Country halls of fame.
The Everly Brothers	1986	2001	Only vocal duo or group in both Halls of Fame
Jerry Lee Lewis	1986	2022	
Elvis Presley	1986	1998	
Sam Phillips	1986 – non-performer	2001 – contributor	Only non-performer in both Halls of Fame
Jimmie Rodgers	1986 – early influence	1961	Only person inducted into both Halls of Fame inaugural classes
Hank Williams	1987 – early influence	1961	
Johnny Cash	1992	1980	First person inducted as performer for both Halls of Fame
Bill Monroe	1997 – early influence	1970	
Johnny Gimble	1999 – early influence	2018	Inducted into the Rock Hall as a member of Bob Wills and His Texas Playboys.
Bob Wills	1999 – early influence	1968	
James Burton	2001 – sideman	2024	
Brenda Lee	2002	1997	First woman inducted into both Halls of Fame
Chet Atkins	2002 – sideman	1973	
Floyd Cramer	2003 – sideman	2003 – musician	Only person inducted into both Halls of Fame in the same year.
Dolly Parton	2022	1999	
Willie Nelson	2023	1993	

=== National Rhythm & Blues Hall of Fame ===
As of 2026, there are 75 members of the Rock and Roll Hall of Fame also inducted into the National Rhythm & Blues Hall of Fame.

Inductee	Year inducted into Rock and Roll Hall of Fame	Year inducted into National Rhythm and Blues Hall of Fame	Notes
Ray Charles	1986	2015	Only person inducted into the Rock, Jazz, Country and R&B Halls of Fame
James Brown	1986	2013	Only one of two people inducted into both Halls of Fame in their inaugural years
Fats Domino	1986	2016	
Sam Cooke	1986	2013/2015	Only one of two people inducted into both Halls of Fame in their inaugural years
Elvis Presley	1986	2015	First white artist inducted into the National R&B Hall of Fame
Little Richard	1986	2015	
Robert Johnson	1986	2017	
Alan Freed	1986	2017	
Aretha Franklin	1987	2015/2019	
Marvin Gaye	1987	2014	
Bo Diddley	1987	2017	
Clyde McPhatter	1987	2023	
Bill Haley	1987	2017	
Smokey Robinson	1987	2016	
Muddy Waters	1987	2015	
Big Joe Turner	1987	2021	
B.B. King	1987	2014	
Jackie Wilson	1987	2013	
Louis Jordan	1987	2017	
The Drifters	1988	2018	
The Supremes	1988	2013	First girl group to be inducted in both Rock and R&B Halls of Fame
Otis Redding	1989	2013	
The Temptations	1989	2013	
Stevie Wonder	1989	2019	
Hank Ballard & The Midnighters	1990/2012	2015	Ballard was inducted solo in 1990; the Midnighters were inducted in 2012
Four Tops	1990	2013	
Louis Armstrong	1990	2017	
LaVern Baker	1991	2020	
John Lee Hooker	1991	2020/2021	
The Impressions	1991	2017	
Wilson Pickett	1991	2016	
Bobby "Blue" Bland	1992	2020	
Jimi Hendrix	1992	2016	First rock artist to be inducted into the Rock, Jazz and R&B Halls of Fame
Sam & Dave	1992	2018	
Ruth Brown	1993	2017	
Etta James	1993	2020	
Sly Stone	1993	2025	Inducted into the Rock Hall as a member of Sly & the Family Stone, and into the R&B Hall as a solo artist.
Dinah Washington	1993	2020	
Johnny Otis	1994	2017	
Martha and the Vandellas	1995	2013	
Gladys Knight & the Pips	1996	2017	
Little Willie John	1996	2013/2016	
Mahalia Jackson	1997	2020	
Bootsy Collins	1997	2016	Inducted into the Rock Hall as a member of Parliament-Funkadelic, and into the R&B Hall as a solo artist.
Lloyd Price	1998	2019	
Dusty Springfield	1999	2023	First white woman inducted into the R&B Hall of Fame
Nat "King" Cole	2000	2020	
Harvey Fuqua	2000	2020	Inducted into the Rock Hall with The Moonglows into the Rock Hall, and into the R&B Hall as a solo artist.
Billie Holiday	2000	2017	
Michael Jackson	2001	2014	
Isaac Hayes	2002	2017	
The Righteous Brothers	2003	2019	
The Dells	2004	2022	
Prince	2004	2016	
The O'Jays	2005	2013	
Percy Sledge	2005	2021	
Little Walter	2008	2021	
Little Anthony & the Imperials	2009	2018	
Bobby Womack	2009	2025	
The Famous Flames	2012	2020	James Brown's backing vocal group was inducted separately in both Halls
The Miracles	2012	2015	
Donna Summer	2013	2021	
Quincy Jones	2013	2025	
Hall & Oates	2014	2023	First white group inducted into both halls of fame
Bill Withers	2015	2025	
Nina Simone	2018	2021	
Sister Rosetta Tharpe	2018	2025	
Whitney Houston	2020	2014	
Tina Turner	2021	2025	
The Spinners	2023	2015	
Dionne Warwick	2024	2016	
Norman Whitfield	2024	2021	
Chubby Checker	2025	2014	
Luther Vandross	2026	2021	
Ed Sullivan	2026	2020	
