= The Dells Sing Dionne Warwicke's Greatest Hits =

Studio album by The Dells
- Released: 1972
- Recorded: 1972
- Genres: Soul, funk
- Length: 52:50
- Labels: Cadet Records; Dusty Groove (reissue)
- Producer: Charles Stepney

The Dells Sing Dionne Warwicke's Greatest Hits [sic] is an album by the vocal group The Dells consisting of music written by Burt Bacharach & Hal David and originally performed by Dionne Warwick.

== Chart performance ==
The album debuted on Billboard magazine's Top LP's & Tape chart in the issue dated June 24, 1972, peaking at No. 162 during a five-week run on the chart.

== Reissue summary ==
From Dusty Groove:

Chess Records takes on the music of Burt Bacharach, with amazing results – thanks to deep soul vocals from The Dells and impeccable production from the legendary Charles Stepney! The album's a tremendous meeting of the minds, as The Dells really transform Bacharach's brilliant compositions – giving them depth and feeling in ways that are quite different from any other renditions of the songs. The arrangements by Stepney are incredible too – on a par with his famous work for Minnie Riperton, Rotary Connection, and Ramsey Lewis – as majestic as Burt Bacharach might have wanted, but with a very different approach, and a slight undercurrent of funk. Instrumentation is by Stepney, Phil Upchurch, and members of The Pharaohs – plus a full string section as well. Another baroque soul classic from the glory days of the Chicago soul scene!

== Track listing ==
- All songs written by Burt Bacharach and Hal David.

No.	Title	Length
1.	"I'll Never Fall in Love Again"	6:00
2.	"Walk On By"	4:57
3.	"This Guy's in Love with You"	5:39
4.	"Raindrops Keep Fallin' on My Head"	4:08
5.	"I Just Don't Know What to Do with Myself"	6:52
6.	"Close to You"	5:10
7.	"Trains and Boats and Planes"	3:38
8.	"A House Is Not a Home"	4:20
9.	"I Say a Little Prayer"	4:06
10.	"Alfie"	4:30
11.	"Wives and Lovers"	3:17

== Personnel ==
The Dells

- Marvin Junior (baritone)
- Johnny Carter (tenor)
- Verne Allison (tenor)
- Mickey McGill (baritone)
- Chuck Barksdale (bass)

Additional musicians

- Charles Stepney – Fender Rhodes, piano, harpsichord, congas, percussion
- Phil Upchurch & Roland Faulkner – guitar
- Cash McCall – guitar (on I Just Don't Know)
- Art Hoyle & Robert Lewis – trumpets
- Ed Druzinsky – harp
- Ether Merker & Paul Ondracek – horns
- Morris Jennings & Donny Simmons – drums
- Bobby Christian – percussion
- Derf Reklaw, Ealee Satterfield, & Oye Bisi Nalls – bongos & congas

Technical personnel

- Arrangements, supervision, & production – Charles Stepney
- Engineers – Gary Starr, Roger Anfinsen, Brian Christian
- Album Coordination – Mia Krinsky
- Production Supervision – Bob Scerbo

== Charts ==
Chart (1972)	Peak position
US Billboard Top LPs & Tape	162
