= The Five Heartbeats =

1991 film by Robert Townsend

- Theatrical release poster
- Directed by: Robert Townsend
- Written by: Robert Townsend; Keenen Ivory Wayans
- Produced by: Loretha C. Jones
- Starring: Robert Townsend; Michael Wright; Leon; Harry J. Lennix; Tico Wells; John Canada Terrell; Harold Nicholas; Diahann Carroll
- Cinematography: Bill Dill
- Edited by: John Carter
- Music by: Stanley Clarke
- Production company: 20th Century Fox
- Distributed by: 20th Century Fox
- Release date: March 29, 1991 (U.S.)
- Running time: 122 minutes
- Country: United States
- Language: English
- Budget: $9-10 million
- Box office: $8,750,400

The Five Heartbeats is a 1991 American musical drama film directed by Robert Townsend, who co-wrote the script with Keenen Ivory Wayans. Produced and distributed by 20th Century Fox, the film's main cast includes Townsend, Michael Wright, Leon Robinson, Harry J. Lennix, Tico Wells, John Canada Terrell, Harold Nicholas, and Diahann Carroll. The plot of the film (which is loosely based on the lives of several artists: The Dells, The Temptations, Four Tops, Wilson Pickett, James Brown, Frankie Lymon, Sam Cooke and others) follows the three decade career of the rhythm and blues vocal group The Five Heartbeats. The film depicts the rise and fall of a Motown-inspired soul act through the eyes of one of the Heartbeats, Donald "Duck" Matthews.

The film was released to most North American audiences on March 29, 1991; however, it was not made available to audiences in other continents until 2002, when a DVD was released. Another DVD was released in 2006 for the film's 15th anniversary. Even though the movie received mixed reviews from critics at the time of its release, it became a cult classic through VHS rentals, with many calling it Townsend's masterpiece.

== Plot ==
Five boys – Donald "Duck" Matthews, Anthony "Choirboy" Stone, J.T. Matthews, Terrence "Dresser" Williams, and Eddie King, Jr. – perform at a Battle of the Bands contest as The Heartbeats. The group loses to Flash and the Ebony Sparks, but pleases the crowd and is noticed by Jimmy Potter. Jimmy offers to manage the group, promising them $100 if they do not win the next month's Battle. After they lose again, Jimmy pays them. When the owner of the club asks to hire them, they agree to let Jimmy manage them.

Bird and The Midnight Falcons, witnessing the Heartbeats rehearsing for a competition, become concerned they could lose; Bird asks his girlfriend to invite her friends and boo The Heartbeats while cheering The Falcons. The announcer, a cousin of one of the Falcons, forces The Heartbeats to use the house piano player. Duck grows frustrated with the pianist's playing and takes over his stool. Eddie leads the group in a number that results in Bird's girlfriend fainting in his arms. The Heartbeats win the contest and the interest of Big Red Davis, who owns Big Red Records. Big Red offers them a deal, but Jimmy and his wife Eleanor Potter, aware of Big Red's corruption, decline. The group instead releases their first single on Jimmy's own independent label and searches for a record company they can trust, but no one else is interested aside from a label that wants to buy Duck's songs for an all-white group they have already signed, The Five Horsemen. As a result, the Heartbeats are forced to sign with Big Red.

The group goes on the road for a music tour. However, the travel is marred by racism and poor living conditions. Dresser's girlfriend visits and reveals she is pregnant. The group's first album cover features white people, despite the label having earlier approved a photo of the Heartbeats as the cover.

Throughout the mid-to-late 1960s, The Five Heartbeats receive awards, chart hits, and are featured on magazine covers. However, Eddie abuses alcohol and cocaine, affecting his performance and prompting his girlfriend, Baby Doll, to break up with him. Convinced that Jimmy intends to replace him due to his deteriorating condition, he cuts a deal with Big Red to have Jimmy cut out of his contract. Jimmy threatens to go to authorities with information about bootlegged LPs, cooked books, and payola that could have Big Red arrested, leading the latter to have him killed. Following Jimmy's funeral, the group learns that Eddie's deceit caused the fallout between Jimmy and Big Red. Big Red is convicted of Jimmy's murder, forcing the group to sign with a new record label. Guilt-ridden over his indirect role in Jimmy's death, Eddie leaves the Heartbeats and falls further into substance abuse and poverty.

The Heartbeats add Flash as their lead singer in Eddie's place. Duck comes to suspect his fiancée, Tanya Sawyer, is having an affair with Choirboy. He follows her to a hotel but discovers that Tanya is meeting with J.T., not Choirboy. Tanya's relationship with J.T. predates her relationship with Duck, but she says she is now in love with Duck. J.T. urges Tanya to disclose the affair, but she refuses. At an awards ceremony celebrating their success, Flash announces he is going solo. Duck reveals that he knows about the affair between Tanya and J.T. and also leaves the group, resulting in the Heartbeats' disbandment.

In the early 1990s, Choirboy has returned to singing in his father's church. Eddie has become sober after converting to Christianity: he is now married to Baby Doll, sings in Choirboy's choir, and manages his own group. He asks Duck to write songs for them, who agrees. J.T. is now married to a wife and two children, including a son named "Duck"; the brothers reconcile. The only one to have maintained a singing career is Flash, who transitioned from doo-wop to pop music, and is part of the group Flash and The Five Horsemen.

At a family gathering, the former Heartbeats reunite with their families and friends and try to remember and show their old moves. At first, Eddie declines, but Eleanor, coming to terms with her husband's death, forgives him.

== Cast ==
- Robert Townsend as Donald "Duck" Matthews, The Five Heartbeats' co-founder and brother of fellow Heartbeat's member J.T. Matthews, and originally was only the composer and musician for the group.
- Michael Wright as Eddie King Jr., the lead vocalist of the band and falls into a life of drugs and alcohol.
- Leon as J.T. Matthews: J.T., the older brother to Duck. A womanizer; he and his brother Duck share a close and sometimes turbulent relationship.
- Harry J. Lennix as Terrence "Dresser" Williams, the group's bass singer. He is replaced by Ernest "Sarge" Johnson as the choreographer after Sarge out-dances Dresser.
- Tico Wells as Anthony "Choirboy" Stone, a choir boy in his father's church, Stone's father does not support his decision to become a secular music artist.
- Tressa Thomas as Clara
- Diahann Carroll as Eleanor Potter, Jimmy Potter's wife.
- John Canada Terrell as Michael "Flash" Turner, previously lead singer of Flash and the Ebony Sparks, Flash is brought in as The Five Heartbeats' lead singer when Eddie goes into a downward spiral.
- Chuck Patterson as Jimmy Potter, The Heartbeats' manager.
- Harold Nicholas as Ernest "Sarge" Johnson, The Five Heartbeats’ choreographer.
- Hawthorne James as Big Red Davis, corrupt owner of Big Red Records.
- Roy Fegan as Victor "Bird" Thomas, the lead singer of Bird and The Midnight Falcons.
- John Witherspoon as Wild Rudy
- Troy Beyer as Baby Doll, Eddie's girlfriend.
- Ann-Marie Johnson as Sydney Todd
- Lisa Mende as Marcia Sayles
- Theresa Randle as Brenda Williams, Dresser's girlfriend.
- Carla Brothers as Tanya Sawyer
- Deborah Lacey as Rose

== Production ==
After writing (along with Keenen Ivory Wayans), producing, directing, and starring in his first film Hollywood Shuffle, Robert Townsend had attained near-cult status among independent filmmakers due to his dedication to that film—a project which caused him to max out all his credit cards and spend nearly $100,000 of his own money raised through savings and various acting jobs in order to produce the film. When writing Townsend's first studio film The Five Heartbeats, Townsend and Wayans kept comedy an important aspect of the film, but also explored complex characters in a more dramatic way.

The Five Heartbeats was originally set up as a development deal at Warner Bros. in 1988, with Keenan Ivory Wayans, his brother Damon, and others tapped to star. Warner passed on the project, and the Wayans moved on to develop and star in the Fox sketch comedy show In Living Color instead.

Townsend resurrected Heartbeats at 20th Century Fox in 1990. Years before, Townsend had had a small role as a member of the fictional Motown-style group "The Sorels" in the 1984 film Streets of Fire. His original screenplay was inspired by the lives and careers of Motown group The Temptations, and Townsend had met with former lead singers David Ruffin and Eddie Kendrick with the intention of hiring them as technical advisors. Fox vetoed bringing Ruffin and Kendrick onto the production, for fear that Motown founder Berry Gordy, Jr. might sue the studio. Rhythm and blues-singing group The Dells, who were renowned for their four-decade career, became the technical advisors instead.

Townsend used his film to depict a similar story to the careers of the Temptations and the Dells, following the lives of three friends who aspire to musical stardom. Given the setting of the film, he was able to tie in other elements, such as race relations, as well.

Due to the production's budgetary constraints, Townsend used little-known actors of the time, with the exceptions of Leon Robinson, Diahann Carroll and Harold Nicholas of The Nicholas Brothers. Townsend had considered Denzel Washington as Eddie King, Jr. and Whitney Houston as Baby Doll. The former was not cast due to budget concerns and the latter passed on the role as it was felt to be too small.

=== Promotion ===
To promote the film prior to its release, Townsend, along with the other actors who portrayed the fictional musical quintet The Five Heartbeats (Leon Robinson, Michael Wright, Harry J. Lennix, and Tico Wells) performed in a concert with real-life Soul/R&B vocal group The Dells, one of many groups that inspired the film. The Dells sang and recorded the vocals as the actors lip synced.

== Music ==
The Five Heartbeats (Music from the Motion Picture)

Soundtrack album by Various Artists
- Released: April 2, 1991
- Genres: R&B, soul
- Label: Virgin

Professional ratings
Review scores
Source	Rating
AllMusic	3/5 stars

Orchestral music for the film was composed by jazz bassist Stanley Clarke.

A soundtrack for the film was released by Virgin Records, featuring original music by various artists. Both "Nights Like This" and "A Heart Is a House for Love" became top 20 hits on the U.S. Billboard Hot R&B Singles chart. Many of the tracks are credited to fictional characters in the film as opposed to the actual vocalists. After 7's "Nights Like This" won the film an ASCAP Award.

1. "A Heart Is a House for Love" - Billy Valentine/ The Dells
2. "We Haven't Finished Yet" - Patti LaBelle, Tressa Thomas, Billy Valentine
3. "Nights Like This" - After 7
4. "Bring Back the Days" - U.S. Male
5. "Baby Stop Running Around" - Bird & The Midnight Falcons
6. "In the Middle" - Dee Harvey
7. "Nothing but Love" - The Dells with Billy Valentine
8. "Are You Ready for Me" - Dee Harvey
9. "Stay in My Corner" - The Dells
10. "I Feel Like Going On" - Andraé Crouch (Eddie, Baby Doll and the L.A. Mass Choir)

=== Certifications ===
Region	Certification	Certified units/sales
United States (RIAA)	Gold	500,000^{^}
^{^} Shipments figures based on certification alone.

== Reception ==
The film grossed approximately $8.5 million after being released in 862 theaters throughout North America. The film was not well received by a majority of critics. On Rotten Tomatoes The Five Heartbeats has an approval rating of 39%, based on reviews from 18 critics.

Roger Ebert of the Chicago Sun-Times commented that:

...at feature length, Townsend shows a real talent, and, not surprisingly, an ability to avoid most cliches, to go for the human truth in his characters...by the end we really care about these guys...There is one obligatory scene showing racial prejudice against the group, and it seems a little tacked on, as if the only purpose of the Southern trip was to justify the scene.

Due to the nature of the film, music montages were often used to progress the plot; critics considered this a major flaw.

The numerous musical performances in the film were highly acclaimed. AllMusic complimented the Dells' lead singer Marvin Junior (who provided the singing voice for fictional character Eddie King Jr.), stating that he was "one of the most underrated voices in pop music". Tressa Thomas's performance of "We Haven't Finished Yet", in particular, was given favorable attention by critics.

The film received an ASCAP award for Most Performed Songs in a Motion Picture for the song "Nights Like This".

== Home media ==
A DVD was released for the film in 2002, and a special edition was also released in 2007 for the film's 15th anniversary, including additional content.
