= Love Is Blue (disambiguation) =

"Love Is Blue" or "L'amour est bleu" is a song whose music was composed by André Popp and whose lyrics were written by Pierre Cour.

Love Is Blue may also refer to:

- Love Is Blue (The Dells album), 1969
- Love Is Blue (Johnny Mathis album), 1968
- "Love Is Blue", a 1997 song by Edward Ball
- Love Is Blue, a 1986 book by Joan Wyndham
- Love Is Blue, a set of four handguns used by Bayonetta in the video game Bayonetta 2
