= Marvin Junior =

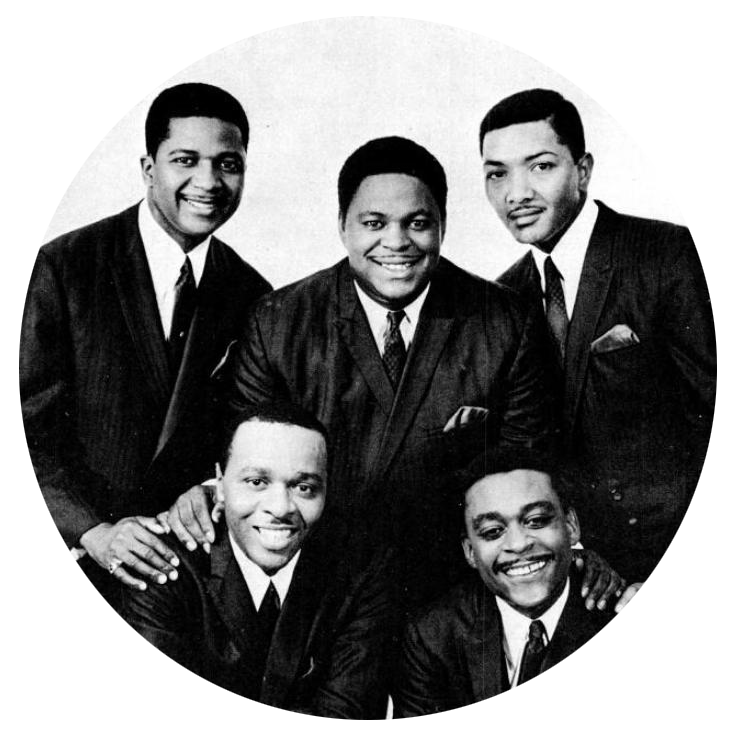
- Junior (stood in center) with The Dells in 1967

Background information
- Born: January 31, 1936; Harrell, Arkansas, US
- Origin: Harvey, Illinois, US
- Died: May 29, 2013 (aged 77) Harvey, Illinois, US
- Genres: Doo-wop, soul
- Years active: 1953–2012
- Formerly of: The Dells

Marvin Junior (January 31, 1936 – May 29, 2013) was an American singer. He was best known as a baritone singer for The Dells.

== Early life ==
Junior was born in Harrell, Arkansas, the only child of Richard Junior and Jessie Allison. He had three half-siblings. When he was six months old, he moved to Harvey, Illinois, where he was raised by his mother, and his aunt and uncle. Junior started singing as a child in Church, and was inspired by his parents, as his mother sang in a spiritual group and his father played guitar. He was also inspired by the Moonglows, the Five Keys and Ray Charles.

Junior attended McKinley Grammar School and Thornton Township High School. After leaving school, he served in the US Army Reserve.

== Career ==
In 1953, while Junior was attending Thornton Township High School, he formed doo-wop group The El-Rays with five other classmates, Michael and Lucius McGill, Johnny Funches, Verne Allison, and Chuck Barksdale. In 1955, they changed their name to The Dells, and a year later recorded their first hit, "Oh, What a Night", written by Junior and member Johnny Funches. The group disbanded in 1958 following a car accident involving the members, but they soon regrouped in 1960 with Johnny Carter replacing Funches as tenor a year later. By the late 1960s, the group had reinvented themselves as a soul act, and had two hits in the US with re-recorded versions of "Stay in My Corner" in 1968 (originally recorded in 1965), and a 1969 soul composition of their first doo-wop hit, "Oh, What a Night", both of which became US top tens.

Junior shared lead vocals with Carter. Junior was once described by David Ruffin of The Temptations as "iron throat" for his huge and versatile vocals. He was remembered holding a long note on "Stay in My Corner", he holds the note for seventeen seconds on the recording, but in live performances would hold it for longer, and on a 1982 re-recording held it for thirty seconds.

The Dells were inducted into both the Vocal Group Hall of Fame and the Rock and Roll Hall of Fame in 2004.

The 1961 lineup consisting of Junior, Michael McGill, Funches, Allison, Barksdale, and Carter, lasted for another forty-eight years, when Carter died in 2009. They toured for three more years, when ill health led forced Junior and Barksdale to retire, with the announcement of the groups retirement coming shortly after their 60th anniversary tour.

== Personal life ==
Junior married his wife, Ruby Caldwell, in 1960. They remained married until his death, and had six children and twelve grandchildren.

== Death ==
Junior died in his sleep at his home in Harvey, Illinois on May 29, 2013, aged 77. He died from kidney failure, and also suffered from a weakened heart.
