= A Heart Is a House for Love =

"A Heart is a House for Love"

Single by The Dells

from the album The Five Heartbeats Original Motion Picture Soundtrack
- Released: 1991
- Recorded: 1991
- Genre: R&B, soul
- Length: 6:12 (album version); 4:12 (single version)
- Label: Virgin Records
- Songwriter(s): Tristin Sigerson, Davitt Sigerson, and Bob Thiele

The Dells singles chronology
"Thought of You Just a Little Too Much" (1988)	"A Heart is a House for Love" (1991)	"Come and Get It" (1992)

"A Heart Is a House for Love" (title often confused with "A Heart Is A House Of Love") is a 1991 single composed by Tristin Sigerson, Davitt Sigerson, and Bob Thiele and recorded by American vocal group The Dells for the film, The Five Heartbeats. The same song was featured on the film's soundtrack.

== History ==
The song was originally featured in the 1991 feature film The Five Heartbeats, which follows the lives of the fictional singing group of the same name. In the scene the song is featured in, the group is about to perform in a Battle of the Bands when the announcer, a cousin of another musician in the competition, tells them backstage that a new house rule demands they use a piano player hired by the owners of the building. The members of the group have not practiced with the piano player, and quickly realize this will harm their performance. The announcer then goads the audience into booing and throwing objects at the Heartbeats as they perform. Duck, tired of his music being altered, throws the piano player off the stage and plays in his own style. The crowd soon applauds as The Heartbeats perform together and the group wins the contest.

The movie version and the single version are different. In the film only the first verse and some of the chorus are sung before Duck interrupts the house piano player; the characters then continue to perform a cappella followed by improvised vocals accompanied by a beat created by the audience. The single features no a cappella vocals and follows a more traditional and contemporary style. There are three verses in the single leading to the outro (which includes the chorus sung with instrumentals). The instruments of the single version include heavy percussion and a light guitar melody.

== Chart performance ==
After an initial peak of number 94 on the Hot R&B Singles chart, following the release of the film, the mid-tempo contemporary R&B song rose to number 13 on the chart, making the group one of the few recording acts to land a top 20 single on a Billboard chart in five decades, first appearing on the charts in 1956 with their doo-wop single "Oh, What a Nite". It was the group's first top 20 R&B single since "I Touched a Dream" (1980) and their first top 40 R&B entry single "You Just Can't Walk Away" (1984).

== Music video ==
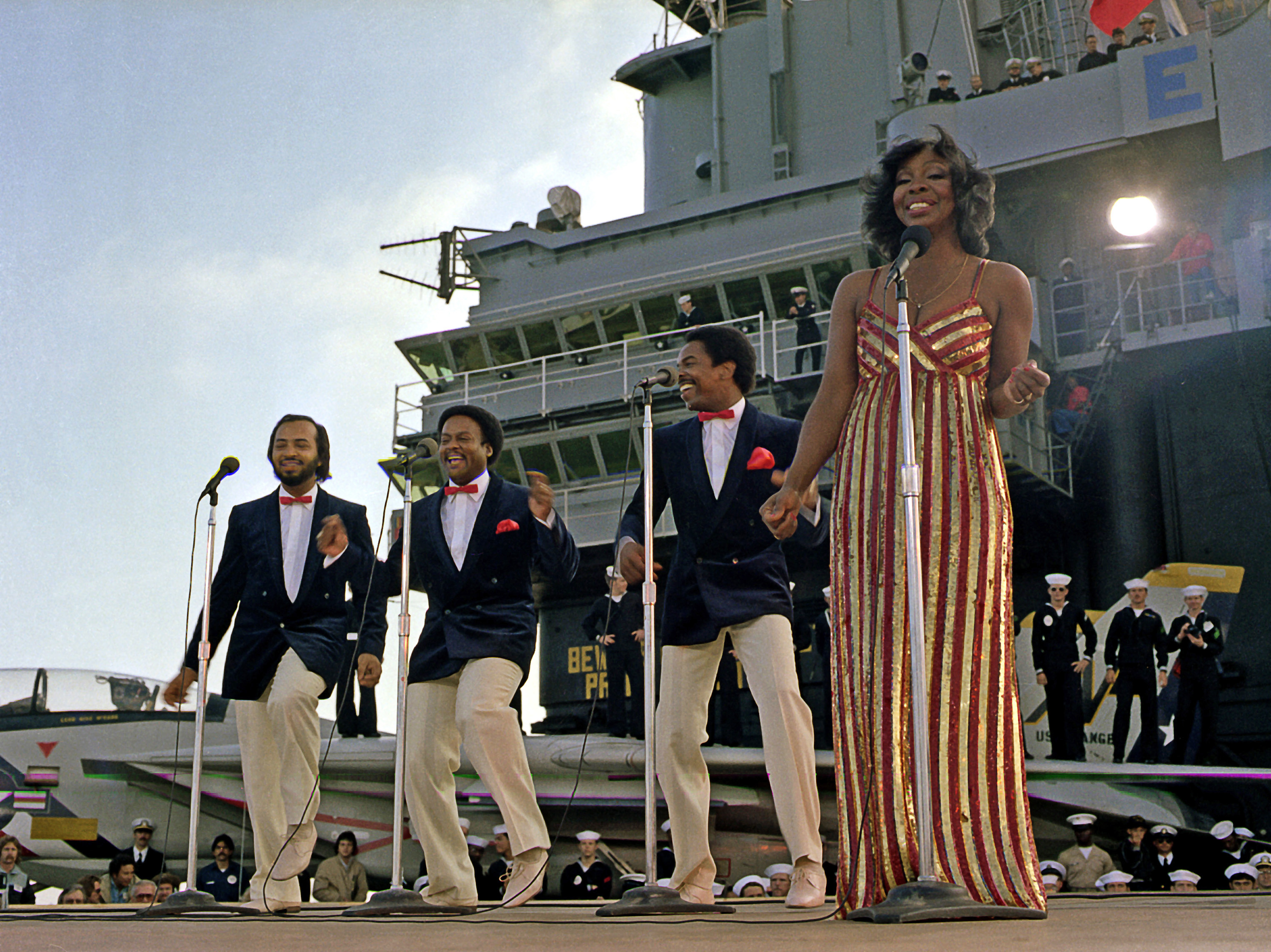
The dance steps performed by the Pips influenced the choreography of the film and the music video for "A Heart Is a House For Love.

The music video features the members of The Dells, who recorded both the single featured in the music video and the version featured in the movie. In the music video the group is seen in a music video recording their song, interrupted by flashbacks including clips from the movie and album covers from both the Dells and the fictional group The Five Heartbeats. One of the flashbacks shows the lead singer singing and cleaning with a woman and then spontaneously stripping off his clothes as she does the same. Although black and white clips are shown of the fictional Five Heartbeats, none of the choreography is featured. Instead the audience witnesses an aged appearance of the Dells who stand still while singing the song and attempt to imitate the clapping and snapping portrayed in the movie.

== Credits ==
- Composed by Tristin and Davitt Sigerson, and Bob Thiele
- Lead Vocals by Marvin Junior
- Background Vocals by Chuck Barksdale, Verne Allison, Michael McGill, and Johnny Carter
- Produced by George Duke

== Charts ==
Chart (1991)	Peak position
U.S. Billboard Hot R&B Singles	13

== See also ==
- The Dells
- The Five Heartbeats
