= The Flamingos =

American doo-wop group

- The Flamingos in 1957. From left to right: Tommy Hunt, Paul Wilson, Jake Carey, Nate Nelson, Terry Johnson

Background information
- Origin: Chicago, Illinois, U.S.
- Genres: Doo-wop; rhythm and blues; pop
- Years active: 1953–present
- Labels: Chance; Parrot; Checker London; Decca; End; Ronze
- Members: The Flamingos: Starling Newsome; Stan Prinston; Theresa Trigg
- Past members: Terry "Buzzy" Johnson; Ezekiel Carey; Jacob Carey; Johnny Carter; Tommy Hunt; Earl Lewis; Sollie McElroy; Nate Nelson; Paul Wilson; Willie Johnson Jr.; Julien Vaught; Eddie Williams; Billy Clarke; Al Fontaine; Doug McClure; Sidney Hall; Eddie Thomas; Bill Hawks; Carl Chambers; Kent Peeler; Troy Anthony; Tony Drake; Duke Johnson; Warren Sherrill; Sonny Ross; Eddie Edgehill; Jerry Abel
- Website: Official website

The Flamingos are an American doo-wop group formed in Chicago in 1953. The band became popular in mid-to-late 1950s and are best known for their 1959 cover version of "I Only Have Eyes for You". They have since been hailed as being one of the finest and most influential vocal groups in pop and doo wop music history. In 2001, the band was inducted into the Rock and Roll Hall of Fame.

The band's cover version of "I Only Have Eyes for You" was ranked number 158 on Rolling Stone magazine's list of the "500 Greatest Songs of All Time".

== History ==
=== Early quintet ===
Jacob "Jake" Carey (bass) and Ezekiel "Zeke" Carey (second tenor) formed the group in Chicago after meeting cousins baritone Paul Wilson and first tenor Johnny Carter at a Hebrew Israelite congregation. Earl Lewis (not the Channels lead) soon joined, and after a series of name changes ("The Swallows", "El Flamingos", "The Five Flamingos"), wound up being known as the Flamingos. Sollie McElroy soon replaced Lewis (who joined the Five Echoes). The Flamingos' first single (for Chance Records), "If I Can't Have You", was a moderate local success, as was the follow-up "That's My Desire", but it was Johnny Carter's composition of "Golden Teardrops", with its complex vocal harmonies and Carter's soaring falsetto, that cemented their reputation as a top regional act of the day.

The Flamingos left Chance Records sometime after their December 1953 session, and signed with DJ Al Benson's Parrot Records. Sollie McElroy was on their first Parrot session, but left the group in December 1954, to be replaced by tenor Nate Nelson (who was on their second Parrot session; he's lead on "I'm Yours", released in January 1955). In early 1955, the Flamingos signed with Chess Records, to record for their Checker Records subsidiary. At Chess/Checker, the Flamingos achieved their first national chart hit with "I'll Be Home", which went to number 5 on Billboard's R&B chart. Pat Boone's cover version of the song, complete with revised lyrics ("My mind's made up" replacing "My time's about up"), was a hit on the pop charts. The group also had moderate success for the label with other chestnuts like "A Kiss from Your Lips", "The Vow" and "Would I Be Crying". The Flamingos also appeared in the 1956 Alan Freed movie Rock, Rock, Rock. Both Zeke Carey and Carter were drafted that year (Carter was drafted in September).

The Flamingos performing "Would I Be Crying" in 1956.

Nate Nelson, Jake Carey and Paul Wilson continued the group with new member Tommy Hunt (added in October 1956). Another new member, tenor/lead, guitarist and arranger, Terry "Buzzy" Johnson, joined in late December 1958. The group (Nate Nelson, Tommy Hunt, Paul Wilson, and Jake Carey) began recording for Decca Records in April 1957. Their most notable single was Johnson's arrangement of "The Ladder of Love", but legal entanglements between Checker and Nate Nelson ruined any chance of commercial success. Zeke Carey returned to the Flamingos in 1958, making the group a sextet. (When Johnny Carter was discharged from the service, he joined the Dells, performing with them for almost 50 years until his death in 2009.)

Zeke and Jake Carey were not blood-related, but were considered cousins, because Zeke was adopted by Jake's aunt and uncle.

=== End Records ===
In 1958 the Flamingos began recording for George Goldner's End Records in New York City, where they had several national hits. Almost immediately, the group had their first pop chart hit with "Lovers Never Say Goodbye", written by Terry Johnson, who shared lead chores on the song with Paul Wilson. The formula was a winner as Johnson and Wilson also led three of the 12 songs selected for their first album Flamingo Serenade – George Gershwin's "Love Walked In", "But Not for Me" and "Time Was". The Flamingos had their biggest seller in 1959 with another old standard from that LP, on which Nate Nelson handled lead vocals. "I Only Have Eyes for You" (written in 1934 by composer Harry Warren and lyricist Al Dubin for the film Dames) became their biggest seller, and has been featured in dozens of movies and TV shows. A long series of hits followed, including the Johnson-penned "Mio Amore", Doc Pomus' composition "Your Other Love", "Nobody Loves Me Like You" (written for the group by Sam Cooke), and "I Was Such a Fool (To Fall in Love with You)". LP cuts "Love Walked In" and "Time Was" were also issued as singles. In the same year, they appeared in the Alan Freed movie, Go, Johnny, Go, singing a frenetic version of "Jump Children" (originally recorded for Chance Records in the early days). The group became known almost as much for their stage show and choreography as for their harmonies. Groups including the Temptations and the Tavares later credited the group as major influences.

=== Splintering of the group ===
The group began to come apart at the turn of the decade. Tommy Hunt left for a solo career in 1960. Nate Nelson and Terry Johnson split to form the "Modern Flamingos" in 1961, and went on to record as the Starglows on Atco Records in 1963. (The Modern Flamingos name was used later; the group would include members of the defunct Del-Knights in the late 1960s). New members were brought in, making the group Zeke Carey (tenor), Jake Carey (bass), Paul Wilson (baritone), Billy Clarke (tenor), Eddie Williams (tenor), Alan Fontaine (guitar), and Julien Vaught (saxophone). Also Johnny Carter left in 1960 to join the Dells. Clarke and Williams took duties performing on most new lead vocals.

A sixth vocalist, Doug McClure, was added in 1962. Shortly afterwards, Clarke and Williams left the group. Founding member Paul Wilson left in 1964, new member Sidney Hall joined in 1966, and Jacob Carey's son J.C. Carey joined in 1969. They recorded several uptempo songs through the 1960s, peaking at number 26 in the UK Singles Chart with "The Boogaloo Party". Around that time, the Flamingos formed their own label, Ronze, and produced many of their own recordings.

The group continued recording into the 1970s. A new album was released in 1972 on Ronze, entitled The Flamingos Today. By this time, the group was the Careys, McClure, Fontaine, the returning Billy Clarke, and former Limelite Clarence Bassett, Jr. New member Frank "Mingo" Ayers joined soon after. More mildly successful recordings came in this decade, including the uptempo "Heavy Hips", and "Buffalo Soldier".

By 1980, the group was Jake Carey, Zeke Carey, Frank Ayers and Jerome Wilson. Ayers left around this time, joining the Del Vikings. In 1984, two new members joined: Bennie Cherry and Archie Satterfield. In 1988, the group was featured at the 1988 Grammy Awards. Paul Wilson died on May 6, 1988. By the early 1990s, the group was the Careys, Satterfield, Ron Reace and Kenny Davis. Later, it was the Careys, Reace, and King Raymond Green. Jake Carey died in 1997. The group recorded a new album, Unspoken Emotions, under the Ronze label in 1999. It featuring re-recordings of "Ain't Nothing But A Party" and "I'll Be Home", led by Zeke Carey. The group appeared on the PBS television special Doo Wop 50 that same year. The lineup was Zeke Carey, J.C. Carey, Ron Reace, King Raymond Green, and Larry Jordan. Zeke Carey died on December 24, 1999. King Raymond Green and Ron Reace left around that time and were replaced by Earnest "Just Mike" Gilbert and former Dynamic Superior George Spann. James Faison entered shortly thereafter. Tommy Hunt had flown in from England (where he had lived since 1970) to perform with this group twice since 2001.

The group split up in late 2005 due to money disputes. Spann, Jordan, Gilbert, and Faison grouped together to reform Spann's old group, The Dynamic Superiors. J.C. Carey brought in new members, and toured with Tommy Hunt starting in April 2007.

Terry Johnson was the most recent owner of the "Flamingos" federal trademark and led the most recent incarnation of the group until his death. The current lineup is Johnson, Starling Newsome, Stan Prinston and musical director Theresa Trigg. The Flamingos featuring Terry Johnson appeared on two PBS specials: Rock and Roll at Fifty (in which they were the only group to have more than two songs featured) and Doo Wop Cavalcade: The Definitive Anthology. In 2013, the Flamingos released the Diamond Anniversary Tour CD. They continue to perform in concerts across the country.

=== Deaths ===
Nate Nelson died from a heart attack on June 1, 1984, at the age of 52.

Paul Wilson died on May 6, 1988, at the age of 53.

Sollie McElroy died on January 15, 1995, at the age of 61.

Jake Carey died on December 10, 1997, at the age of 71.

Zeke Carey died from cancer on December 24, 1999, at the age of 66.

Billy Clarke died prior to 2002.

Johnny Carter died on August 21, 2009, at the age of 75.

Eddie Edgehill died from a heart attack on January 13, 2010, at the age of 74.

Al Fontaine died on October 26, 2013, at the age of 71.

Tony Drake died on August 9, 2017.

Doug McClure died on July 6, 2018, at the age of 78.

Julien Vaught died on May 5, 2019, at the age of 79.

Tommy Hunt died on February 12, 2025, at the age of 91.

Terry "Buzzy" Johnson died on October 8, 2025, at the age of 86.

=== Pepsi lawsuit ===
J. C. Carey, Jr., Terry Johnson, Tommy Hunt and descendants of Nate Nelson and Paul Wilson sued PepsiCo for having used "I Only Have Eyes For You" in a 1998 television commercial, allegedly without having consulted the group. The group was awarded $250,000.

== Awards ==
The Flamingos received the Rhythm & Blues Foundation Pioneer Award in 1996 (where Terry Johnson, Jake Carey, Zeke Carey, Tommy Hunt, and Johnny Carter performed) and were inducted into the Vocal Group Hall of Fame in 2000, the Rock and Roll Hall of Fame in 2001, and the Doo-Wop Hall of Fame in 2004. The group which performed at the Rock Hall ceremony included Terry Johnson on lead, Hunt, and Carter. In 2003, the Flamingos' recording of "I Only Have Eyes For You" was inducted into the Grammy Hall of Fame. In 2013 Terry Johnson & The Flamingos received the Heroes and Legends Award (HAL) in the Pioneer category.

== Discography ==
=== Albums ===
==== Studio albums ====
- Flamingos (1959)
- Flamingo Serenade (1959)
- Flamingo Favorites (1960)
- Requestfully Yours (1960)
- The Sound Of The Flamingos (1962)
- Color Them Beautiful (1971)
- Today (1972)
- In Touch With You (1983)
- Unspoken Emotions (1999)

==== Compilations ====
- Rock, Rock, Rock! (1956)
- The Flamingos Meet The Moonglows On The Dusty Road Of Hits (1962)
- Their Hits Then And Now (1966)
- The Flamingos Greatest Hits (1973)
- Greatest Hits (1974)

=== Singles ===
Year	Titles (A-side, B-side) Both sides from same album except where indicated	Chart positions				Album
Year	Titles (A-side, B-side) Both sides from same album except where indicated	US	US R&B	CAN (CHUM RPM)	UK	Album
1953	"Someday, Someway" b/w "If I Can't Have You"	—	—	—	—	The Flamingos Meet the Moonglows (On the Dusty Road of Hits)
1953	"That's My Desire" b/w "Hurry Home Baby" (Non-album track)	—	—	—	—	The Flamingos Meet the Moonglows (On the Dusty Road of Hits)
1953	"Golden Teardrops" b/w "Carried Away"	—	—	—	—	The Flamingos Meet the Moonglows (On the Dusty Road of Hits)
1953	"Plan for Love" b/w "You Ain't Ready"	—	—	—	—	Non-album tracks
1954	"Cross Over the Bridge" b/w "Listen to My Plea" (Non-album track)	—	—	—	—	The Flamingos Meet the Moonglows (On the Dusty Road of Hits)
1954	"Dream of a Lifetime" b/w "On My Merry Way"	—	—	—	—	Flamingos
1954	"Jump Children" b/w "Blues in a Letter"	—	—	—	—	Non-album tracks
1954	"I Really Don't Want to Know" b/w "Get with It" (Non-album track)	—	—	—	—	Flamingos (1976 reissue only)
1955	"I'm Yours" b/w "Ko Ko Mo" (from Flamingos)	—	—	—	—	Non-album tracks
1955	"When" b/w "That's My Baby" (from Flamingos)	—	—	—	—	Non-album tracks
1955	"I Want to Love You" b/w "Please Come Back Home"	—	—	—	—	Non-album tracks
1956	"A Kiss from Your Lips" b/w "Get with It" (Non-album track)	—	12	—	—	Rock Rock Rock (soundtrack)
1956	"I'll Be Home" b/w "Need Your Love" (Non-album track)	—	5	—	—	Rock Rock Rock (soundtrack)
1956	"The Vow" b/w "Shilly Dilly" (from Flamingos)	—	—	—	—	Rock Rock Rock (soundtrack)
1956	"Would I Be Crying" b/w "Just for a Kick" (Non-album track)	—	—	—	—	Rock Rock Rock (soundtrack)
1957	"The Ladder of Love" b/w "Let's Make Up"	—	—	29/24	—	Non-album tracks
1957	"Helpless" b/w "My Faith in You"	—	—	—	—	Non-album tracks
1958	"Where Mary Go" b/w "The Rock and Roll March"	—	—	—	—	Non-album tracks
1959	"Dream of a Lifetime" b/w "Whispering Stars"	—	—	—	—	Flamingos
1959	"(They're Writing Songs of Love) But Not for Me" b/w "I Shed a Tear at Your Wedding" (Non-album track)	—	—	—	—	Flamingo Serenade
1959	"Ever Since I Met Lucy" b/w "Kiss-A-Me"	—	—	—	—	Non-album tracks
1959	"I Only Have Eyes for You"; Original B-side: "Goodnight Sweetheart"; Later B-side: "At the Prom" (Non-album track)	11	3	7	—	Flamingo Serenade
1959	"Love Walked In"; Original B-side: "At the Prom" (Non-album track); Later B-side: "Yours"	88	—	—	—	Flamingo Serenade
1959	"Lovers Never Say Goodbye" b/w "That Love Is You"	52	25	—	—	Non-album tracks
1960	"I Was Such a Fool (To Fall in Love with You)" b/w "Heavenly Angel" (from Flamingo Favorites)	71	—	—	—	Requestfully Yours
1960	"Mio Amore"; Original B-side: "You, Me and the Sea" (from Requestfully Yours); Later B-side: "At Night" (from Requestfully Yours)	74	27	23	—	Flamingo Favorites
1960	"Nobody Loves Me Like You"; Original B-side: "You, Me and the Sea"; Later B-side: "Besame Mucho" (from Flamingo Favorites)	30	23	—	—	Requestfully Yours
1960	"Besame Mucho" b/w "You, Me and The Sea" (from Requestfully Yours)	—	—	—	—	Flamingo Favorites
1960	"Beside You" b/w "When I Fall In Love"	—	—	—	—	Requestfully Yours
1960	"Your Other Love" b/w "Lovers Gotta Cry"	54	—	16	—	Non-album tracks
1961	"Kokomo" b/w "That's Why I Love You" (from Flamingo Favorites)	92	—	—	—	Non-album tracks
1961	"Time Was" b/w "Dream Girl" (from Flamingo Favorites)	45	—	—	—	Flamingo Serenade
1961	"Golden Teardrops" b/w "Carried Away"; Vee-Jay reissue	108	—	—	—	The Flamingos Meet the Moonglows (On the Dusty Road of Hits)
1961	"My Memories Of You" b/w "I Want to Love You"	—	—	—	—	Non-album tracks
1962	"It Must Be Love" b/w "I'm No Fool Anymore"	—	—	—	—	Non-album tracks
1962	"Near You" b/w "For All We Know"	—	—	—	—	Non-album tracks
1963	"I Know Better" b/w "Flame of Love"	107	—	—	—	The Sound of the Flamingos
1963	"(Talk About) True Love" b/w "Come On to My Party"	—	—	—	—	Non-album tracks
1963	"Ol' Man River"—Part I b/w Part II	—	—	—	—	The Sound Of The Flamingos
1964	"Lover, Come Back to Me" b/w "Your Little Guy"	—	—	—	—	Non-album tracks
1964	"Goodnight Sweetheart" b/w "Does It Really Matter" (Non-album track)	—	—	—	—	Flamingo Serenade
1965	"Call Her on the Phone" b/w "Temptation"	—	—	—	—	Non-album tracks
1966	"The Boogaloo Party" b/w "The Nearness of You"	93	22	94	26	Their Hits Then and Now
1966	"Brooklyn Boogaloo" b/w "Since My Baby Put Me Down"	—	—	—	—	Their Hits Then and Now
1966	"She Shook My World" b/w "Itty Bitty Baby"	—	—	—	—	Non-album tracks
1967	"Koo Koo" b/w "It Keeps the Doctor Away"	—	—	—	—	Non-album tracks
1967	"Oh Mary Don't You Worry" b/w "Do It, to It"	—	—	—	—	Non-album tracks
1969	"Dealin' (Groovin' with a Feelin')" b/w "Dealin' All the Way"	—	48	—	—	Color Them Beautiful
1970	"Buffalo Soldier" (Short version) b/w "Buffalo Soldier" (Long version)	86	28	54	—	Non-album tracks
1971	"Welcome Home" b/w "Gotta Have All Your Lovin'"	—	—	—	—	Color Them Beautiful
1974	"Think About Me" Part 1 b/w Part 2	—	—	—	—	Non-album tracks
1975	"Someone to Watch Over Me" b/w "Heavy Hips"	—	—	—	—	Non-album tracks
1976	"Love Keeps the Doctor Away" (Long version) b/w Short version of A-side	—	—	—	—	Non-album tracks
"—" denotes releases that did not chart or were not released in that territory.
