= Love Is Blue (The Dells album) =

Studio album by The Dells
- Released: 1969
- Recorded: June 1969
- Studios: Ter Mar, Chicago
- Genres: Soul, doo-wop
- Label: Cadet
- Producer: Bobby Miller

Professional ratings
Review scores
| Source | Rating |
|---|---|
| Rolling Stone | (favourable) |
| AllMusic | 4.5/5 stars |

Love Is Blue is the 1969 fifth studio album by The Dells on Cadet Records.

== Chart performance ==
The album debuted on Billboard magazine's Top LP's chart in the issue dated August 23, 1969, peaking at No. 54 during a twenty-four-week run on the chart. On the magazine's Best Selling Soul LP's chart, it peaked at No. 3 in the issue dated October 25, 1969. The album debuted on Cashbox magazine's Top 100 Albums chart in the issue dated August 30, 1969, peaking at No. 42 during a five-week run on the chart. It was also the group's first and final album to chart in Canada, reaching No. 45 there.

== Track listing ==
=== Side 1 ===
1. "I Can Sing a Rainbow / Love Is Blue"
2. "Oh, What a Night"
3. "Dock of the Bay"
4. "A Little Understanding"
5. "One Mint Julep"

=== Side 2 ===
1. "A Whiter Shade of Pale"
2. "A Summer Place"
3. "The Glory of Love"
4. "Honey"
5. "Wichita Lineman"/"By the Time I Get to Phoenix"

== Recording ==
The album was recorded at Ter Mar Studio, Chicago, in June 1969 in CONCEPT 12.

== Personnel ==
- Charles Stepney – Arranger
- Bobby Miller – Producer
- Stu Black – Engineer
- Lee Russo – cover photo
- Warren Linn – Liner illustration
- Randy Harter – Art Direction

== Charts ==
| Chart (1969) | Peak position |
|---|---|
| US Billboard Top LPs | 54 |
| US Best Selling Soul LP's | 3 |
| US Cashbox Top 100 Albums | 42 |
| CAN RPM Top 100 Albums | 45 |
