= Johnny Carter (singer) =

American singer (1934–2009)

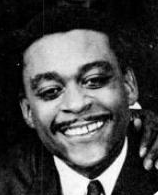
- Carter in 1967

Background information
- Born: John E. Carter; June 2, 1934; Chicago, Illinois, U.S.
- Died: August 21, 2009 (aged 75) Harvey, Illinois, U.S.
- Genres: Rhythm and blues, doo-wop
- Occupation: Singer
- Years active: 1960–2009

John E. Carter (June 2, 1934 – August 21, 2009) was an American doo-wop and R&B singer. He was a founding member of The Flamingos and a member of The Dells. Both groups have been inducted into the Rock and Roll Hall of Fame, making Carter one of the few multiple inductees.

He joined The Dells as a replacement for Johnny Funches in 1960 and remained an active member of the group until his death. He was a veteran of the United States Army where he served as a cook. Carter died of lung cancer in Harvey, Illinois at the age of 75.
