= Stay in My Corner =

Single by The Dells

from the album It's Not Unusual (original) There Is (re-recording)
- A-side: "Stay in My Corner"
- B-side: "It's Not Unusual" (original); "Love is So Simple" (re-recording)
- Released: 1965 (original); 1968 (re-recording)
- Recorded: 1965 (original); 1967 (re-recording)
- Genre: Soul
- Length: 6:10
- Label: Vee-Jay (original); Cadet (re-recording)
- Songwriters: Wade Flemons; Robert Eugene Miller; Barrett Strong
- Producer: Bobby Miller

The Dells singles chronology
"Oh, What a Good Nite" (1964)	"Stay in My Corner" (1965)	"Hey Sugar" (1965)

"Stay in My Corner" is a 1965 soul song by The Dells. It was released as a single on the Vee-Jay label and peaked in the top 30 on the R&B singles chart. Three years later, The Dells rerecorded "Stay in My Corner" on the Cadet label and took the new version of the song to number one for three weeks on the R&B charts. The single was the most successful of their career and crossed over to the pop charts as well..

The songwriters were Wade Flemons, Robert Eugene Miller, and Barrett Strong.

Patti LaBelle recorded a cover of the song for her 1994 album, Gems. Dru Hill covered song in 1998.

== Chart positions ==
Chart (1965)	Peak position
U.S. Billboard Hot Black Singles	23

== Chart positions ==
Chart (1968) (re-recording)	Peak position
U.S. Billboard Hot 100	10
U.S. Billboard Hot Black Singles	1
