= Oh, What a Night (The Dells song) =

Single by The Dells

from the album Oh, What a Nite (original version) / Love Is Blue (re-recorded version)
- B-side: "Believe Me"
- Released: August 1969
- Recorded: 1969
- Genre: Doo-wop; soul
- Length: 4:07
- Label: Cadet Records
- Songwriters: Marvin Junior, Johnny Funches
- Producer: Bobby Miller

The Dells singles chronology
"I Can Sing A Rainbow/Love Is Blue" (1969)	"Oh, What a Night" (1969)	"On the Dock of the Bay" (1969)

Official audio
- "Oh, What a Night" (Cadet label) on YouTube

"Oh, What a Night" is a song first recorded by the doo-wop group the Dells and released in 1956, originally under the title "Oh, What a Nite". It is said to have been inspired by a party, which had been held in the Dells' honor by some female friends of the group.

== Reception ==
The Dells' original 1956 recording on the Vee-Jay label peaked at #4 on the R&B singles chart. In 1969, they refashioned it as a soul song on the Cadet label. The August 2, 1969 edition of Record World gave it a "Four Star Pick" review, stating: "This old, old, old, oldie sounds newer than tomorrow, via the Dells chartbreaker express. All will dig." The new "Oh, What a Night" was notably different from its original counterpart with an altered arrangement and tempo, and included a spoken recitation, in the introduction, from bass singer Chuck Barksdale. This new version reached #10 on the Billboard Hot 100 singles chart and #1 on the Best Selling Soul singles chart.

The 1969 version was ranked #260 on Rolling Stone's list of The 500 Greatest Songs of All Time.

"Oh, What a Night" was subsequently recorded by Sly Stone & the Biscaynes (1978), Tracey Ullman (1983), Lester Bowie (1986), the Moonlighters (1988), Nick Kamen (1988), Barbara Jones (1995), Donnie & the Del Chords (1999), and Unisoghn (2001).

== Personnel ==
=== 1956 version ===
- Lead vocals: Johnny Funches, Marvin Junior
- Background vocals: Johnny Funches, Marvin Junior, Michael McGill, Chuck Barksdale, Verne Allison

=== 1969 version ===
- Lead vocals: Junior Marvin (Marvin Junior), Johnny Carter
- Background vocals: Johnny Carter, Michael McGill, Chuck Barksdale, Verne Allison
- Spoken intro: Chuck Barksdale
- Producer: Bobby Miller
