= The Dells =

American R&B vocal group

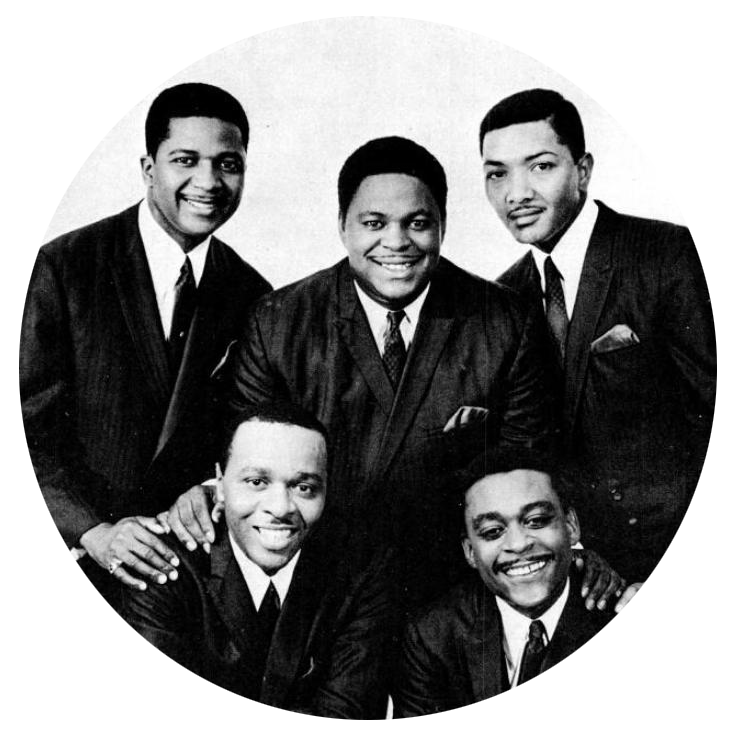
- The Dells in 1967: (Top row, L-R): Michael McGill, Marvin Junior, Verne Allison. (Bottom row, L-R): Chuck Barksdale, Johnny Carter.

Background information
- Also known as: The El-Rays, The Mighty Dells
- Origin: Harvey, Illinois, U.S.
- Genres: R&B, doo-wop, soul
- Years active: 1953–2012
- Labels: Cadet/Chess, Vee-Jay, Mercury, ABC, 20th Century Fox, Ichiban, Virgin, Philadelphia International, Volt
- Past members: Marvin Junior; Verne Allison; Michael McGill; Chuck Barksdale; Johnny Funches; Lucius McGill; Johnny Carter
- Website: Themightydells.com

The Dells were an American R&B vocal group. Formed in high school in 1953 by founding members Marvin Junior, Verne Allison, Johnny Funches, Chuck Barksdale, and Michael and Lucius McGill, under the name the El-Rays. They released their first recording in 1954 and two years later had their first R&B hit with "Oh What a Night". After disbanding due to a near-fatal car crash in 1958, the group re-formed in 1960 with Funches being replaced by Johnny Carter. This lineup remained together until Carter's death in 2009. In 2004 the Dells were inducted into both the Rock and Roll Hall of Fame and the Vocal Group Hall of Fame. The group performed until illness forced longtime lead singer Marvin Junior and bass vocalist Chuck Barksdale into retirement, ending the group's 60-year run.

== History ==
=== Early career ===
The Dells grew up in Harvey, Illinois, and began singing together while attending Thornton Township High School. Forming in 1952 under the name the El-Rays, the group initially consisted of Marvin Junior, Michael McGill, Lucius McGill, Verne Allison, Chuck Barksdale, and Johnny Funches. Lucius McGill soon left the group and the remaining quintet signed with Checker Records, releasing their first single, "Darling I Know", which flopped.

In 1955, the group renamed themselves the Dells and signed with Vee-Jay Records. In 1956, they recorded their first hit, "Oh, What a Night" (a song co-written by Johnny Funches, who also sang lead on the recording alongside Marvin Junior), which hit the top 5 of the R&B singles chart. It sold more than one million copies, and was awarded a gold disc. The song is ranked No. 260 on the Rolling Stone magazine's list of The 500 Greatest Songs of All Time. In November 1958, the Dells suffered a car accident that left McGill in a hospital for six months. The group temporarily disbanded and Barksdale sang as a member of Harvey Fuqua's spinoff Moonglows act, Harvey and the Moonglows, which included a young Marvin Gaye. In 1961, the Dells reunited and auditioned for Dinah Washington. After Washington agreed to hire them, Johnny Funches left the group to take care of his family. Funches was replaced by Flamingos founding member Johnny Carter and sang background for Washington for two years. In 1966, they were hired to open for Ray Charles, only to be fired after a performance resulted in several standing ovations. The group would also sing background for Barbara Lewis, mainly on Lewis' 1963 hit, "Hello Stranger", while also working with Quincy Jones, who helped to fine-tune their vocals for standards and jazz material.

=== Successful years ===
In 1966, the Dells returned to Chess under the label's Cadet subsidiary working with Bobby Miller and future Earth, Wind & Fire arranger Charles Stepney. In 1967, the Dells issued the album There Is which included their first R&B chart-topper in years with the title track, which showcased the sharp baritone of Marvin Junior and the harmonies with the four other Dells. The song was also their first top 20 pop hit.

Subsequent R&B hits included "Wear It on Our Face", "Always Together" (top 20 pop), "I Can Sing a Rainbow - Love is Blue (medley)" (UK No. 15), and their first No. 1 R&B hit and first top 10 pop hit, 1968's "Stay in My Corner", which reached No. 10 on the pop chart and showcased both Carter and Marvin in lead vocals. In the following year, 1969, The Dells' soulful remake of their debut hit, "Oh What a Night" gave the group their second chart-topping R&B single and also reached the top ten on the Billboard Hot 100. For a second time, the song sold over a million copies. Subsequent hits included "Open Up My Heart", "Oh What a Day", and "On the Dock of the Bay". In 1971, the Dells' "The Love We Had Stays on My Mind" became another top ten hit on the R&B chart, also reaching the pop top 30. By this time, Charles Stepney had taken over production duties from Bobby Miller. 1973's "Give Your Baby a Standing Ovation" was their third certified gold record. The song was written by L.V. Johnson and produced by Don Davis.

=== Later years ===
Leaving Cadet around the end of 1974 with the parent company in financial difficulties, the group would continue recording in order under the Mercury, ABC, and Virgin labels finding some hits, including 1980's "I Touched a Dream", which returned the group to the top 40 on the R&B chart. The Dells were confined mostly to the oldies market afterwards until they were asked to be creative consultants to Robert Townsend's acclaimed 1991 film, The Five Heartbeats, which was loosely based on the lives of The Dells and other groups of its era. The group recorded a composition titled "A Heart Is a House for Love", which reached number 13, making them the first group to chart a top 40 R&B hit in five consecutive decades. It was the group's 33rd and final top 40 R&B entry. The following year, signing with PIR, they released the album, I Salute You. The Dells continued performing and recording sporadically in the early years of the new millennium. In 2004, the group were inducted to both the Vocal Group Hall of Fame and the Rock and Roll Hall of Fame and in 2022 into National Rhythm & Blues Hall of Fame. The group continued performing until 2012, when they gave their farewell concert at the Rock and Roll Hall of Fame museum in Cleveland that June.

=== Deaths ===
Original Dells vocalist Johnny Funches died of pneumonia on January 23, 1998, at the age of 62.

Johnny Carter died of cancer on August 21, 2009, at the age of 75. Carter is one of the few artists to be a double Rock and Roll Hall of Fame inductee, having been inducted with The Flamingos in 2001, and the Dells in 2004.

On May 29, 2013, founding member Marvin Junior died in his sleep at his home in Harvey, Illinois, succumbing to complications of kidney failure and a weak heart at the age of 77.

Lucius McGill died on July 18, 2014, two days before his 79th birthday.

Chuck Barksdale died on May 15, 2019, at the age of 84.

Verne Allison died on October 7, 2026, at the age of 90, leaving Michael McGill as the last surviving member of the group.

== Personnel ==
Members

- Marvin Junior (Marvin Curtis Junior, January 31, 1936, Harrell, Arkansas – May 29, 2013) - lead baritone, lead vocals (1952–1958, 1960–2012)
- Verne Allison (June 22, 1936, Chicago – October 6, 2026) - second tenor, background vocals (1952–1958, 1960–2012)
- Michael McGill (born February 17, 1937, Chicago) - baritone, background vocals (1952–1958, 1960–2012)
- Chuck Barksdale (born Charles Barksdale, January 11, 1935 – May 15, 2019) - bass, background vocals (1952–1958, 1960–2012)
- Johnny Funches (July 18, 1935, Chicago – January 23, 1998) - first tenor, lead vocals (1952–58, 1960–1961)
- Lucius McGill (July 20, 1935, Chicago – July 18, 2014) - second tenor, background vocals (1952–54)
- Johnny Carter (June 2, 1934, Chicago – August 21, 2009) - first tenor/falsetto, lead vocals (1961–2009)

Group Lineup

1952–1958 1960–1961	1961–2009	2009–2012
Marvin Junior - lead/baritone; Verne Allison - second tenor; Michael “Mickey” McGill - baritone; Chuck Barksdale - bass; Johnny Funches - first tenor	Marvin Junior - lead/baritone; Verne Allison - second tenor; Michael “Mickey” McGill - baritone; Chuck Barksdale - bass; Johnny Carter - first tenor/falsetto	Marvin Junior - lead/baritone; Verne Allison - second tenor; Michael “Mickey” McGill - baritone; Chuck Barksdale - bass

== Awards ==
- Rock and Roll Hall of Fame (Inducted 2004)
- Vocal Group Hall of Fame (Inducted 2004)
- Rhythm & Blues Foundation "Pioneer Award" (Awarded 1992)
- NAACP Image Award - Hall of Fame Award (Awarded 1992)
- National Rhythm and Blues Hall of Fame (Inducted 2022)
