= The Very Best of The Blues Brothers =

Greatest hits album by The Blues Brothers
- Released: 1995
- Recorded: 1978–1980
- Genre: Blues, blues-rock, blue-eyed soul
- Length: 75:49
- Label: Atlantic

The Blues Brothers chronology
The Definitive Collection (1992)	The Very Best of The Blues Brothers (1995)	Blues Brothers & Friends: Live from House of Blues (1997)

The Very Best of The Blues Brothers is a 1995 greatest hits album by The Blues Brothers. It is one of several compilations of the band's recordings, following Best of The Blues Brothers (1981) and Dancin' wid da Blues Brothers (1983).

== Track listing ==
1. "Everybody Needs Somebody to Love" 1980
2. "Gimme Some Lovin'" 1980
3. "Think" (with Aretha Franklin) 1980
4. "Soul Man" 1978
5. "Soul Finger/Funky Broadway" 1980
6. "She Caught the Katy" 1980
7. "Theme from Rawhide" 1980
8. "Sweet Home Chicago" 1980
9. "Shake a Tail Feather" (with Ray Charles) 1980
10. "Hey Bartender" 1978
11. "Messin' with the Kid" 1978
12. "Opening: I Can't Turn You Loose" 1978
13. "(I Got Everything I Need) Almost" 1978
14. "The Old Landmark" (with James Brown) 1980
15. "Minnie the Moocher" (with Cab Calloway) 1980
16. "Green Onions" 1980
17. "Guilty" 1980
18. "Riot in Cell Block Number 9" 1980
19. "Shot Gun Blues" 1978
20. ""B" Movie Box Car Blues" 1978
21. "Peter Gunn Theme" 1980
22. "Closing: I Can't Turn You Loose" 1978

== Personnel ==
- Dan Aykroyd (as Elwood Blues) – vocals, harmonica
- John Belushi (as "Joliet" Jake Blues) – vocals
- Steve "The Colonel" Cropper – guitar
- Donald "Duck" Dunn – bass guitar
- Murphy "Murph" Dunne – keyboards, electric piano, Wurlitzer
- Steve "Getdwa" Jordan – drums, backing vocals
- Tom "Bones" Malone – tenor and baritone saxophone, trombone, trumpet, horn arrangements
- Lou "Blue Lou" Marini – tenor and alto saxophone
- Matt "Guitar" Murphy – lead guitar
- Alan "Mr. Fabulous" Rubin – trumpet, backing vocals
- Tom "Triple Scale" Scott – tenor and alto saxophone, horn arrangements
- Paul "The Shiv" Shaffer – keyboards, piano, Hammond organ, Wurlitzer, backing vocals, musical director
- Willie Hall – drums

== Certifications ==
Region	Certification	Certified units/sales
France (SNEP)	Gold	100,000^{*}
Spain (PROMUSICAE)	Gold	50,000^{^}
^{*} Sales figures based on certification alone.^{^} Shipments figures based on certification alone.
