= Dancin' wid da Blues Brothers =

Compilation album by The Blues Brothers
- Released: 1983
- Genre: Blues
- Label: Atlantic

Dancin' wid da Blues Brothers is the fifth album by The Blues Brothers. It is a rare official Atlantic mini LP compiling seven tracks from previous albums, including four tracks taken from The Blues Brothers: Music from the Soundtrack album, two tracks from the Briefcase Full of Blues album, and one track from the Made in America album.

== Track listing ==
1. "Intro: I Can't Turn You Loose/Time Is Tight"
2. "Peter Gunn Theme"
3. "Shake a Tail Feather"
4. "Soul Man"
5. "Rubber Biscuit"
6. "Do You Love Me/Mother Popcorn"
7. "Gimme Some Lovin'"
8. "Sweet Home Chicago"

== Personnel ==
- Elwood Blues – vocals, harmonica
- "Joliet" Jake Blues – vocals
- Ray Charles – keyboards, vocals on track 3
- Matt "Guitar" Murphy – lead guitar
- Steve "The Colonel" Cropper – guitar
- Donald "Duck" Dunn – bass guitar
- Paul "The Shiv" Shaffer – keyboards, background vocals
- Murphy Dunne – keyboards, background vocals
- Steve "Getdwa" Jordan – drums, background vocals
- Willie Hall – drums
- Lou "Blue Lou" Marini – tenor and alto saxophones
- Tom "Triple Scale" Scott – tenor and alto saxophones
- Tom "Bones" Malone – tenor and baritone saxophones, trombone, trumpet, background vocals
- Alan "Mr. Fabulous" Rubin – trumpet, background vocals
