= Blues Brothers and Friends: Live from Chicago's House of Blues =

Live From House of Blues

Live album by The Blues Brothers & Friends
- Released: May 20, 1997
- Recorded: House of Blues, Chicago, Illinois opening night, October 1, 1996
- Genre: Blues; soul
- Label: House Of Blues
- Producer: Ira Antelis, Steve Devick & Dan Aykroyd

The Blues Brothers & Friends chronology
The Very Best Of The Blues Brothers (1995)	Live From House of Blues (1997)	Blues Brothers 2000: Original Motion Picture Soundtrack (1998)

Professional ratings
Review scores
Source	Rating
Allmusic	2/5 stars

Blues Brothers and Friends: Live from Chicago's House of Blues is the eleventh album and fourth live album by The Blues Brothers in 1997. It was recorded at the opening of the House of Blues in Chicago and is the first recording to feature James Belushi, performing under the name "Zee Blues". It is also the first album to feature original keyboardist Paul Shaffer since their earlier live recording Made in America in 1980. A number of prominent guests joined the band on stage, including Joe Walsh, Billy Boy Arnold, Charley Musselwhite, Jeff Baxter and Sam Moore. This is also the first album to feature Tommy "Pipes" McDonnell, who had replaced Larry Thurston as lead vocalist.

== Track listing ==
1. "Intro"
2. "Green Onions"
3. "Chicken Shack"
4. "Sweet Home Chicago"
5. "I Wish You Would" (featuring Billy Boy Arnold)
6. "Messin' with the Kid" (featuring Sergei Varonov)
7. "All My Money Back" (featuring Lonnie Brooks)
8. "Born in Chicago" (featuring Charlie Musselwhite)
9. "Blues, Why You Worry Me?" (featuring Charlie Musselwhite)
10. "Groove With Me Tonight" (featuring Syl Johnson)
11. "634-5789" (featuring Eddie Floyd)
12. "All She Wants to Do Is Rock" (featuring Tommy "Pipes" McDonnell)
13. "Flip, Flop and Fly"
14. "Money (That's What I Want)" (featuring Sam Moore, Jeff Baxter and Tommy "Pipes" McDonnell)
15. "Viva Las Vegas" (featuring Sam Moore, Jeff Baxter and Tommy "Pipes" McDonnell)

== Personnel ==
- Elwood Blues – Vocals, Harmonica
- Brother Zee Blues – Vocals, Harmonica
- Matt "Guitar" Murphy – Lead Guitar
- Steve "The Colonel" Cropper – Guitar
- Donald "Duck" Dunn – Bass guitar
- Lou "Blue Lou" Marini – Tenor & Alto Saxophones
- Alan "Mr. Fabulous" Rubin – Trumpet
- Paul "The Shiv" Shaffer – keyboards, Background Vocals
- Danny "G-Force" Gottlieb - drums
- Birch "Crimson Slide" Johnson - Trombone
- Leon Pendarvis - Keyboards
- Tommy "Pipes" McDonnell - percussion, Lead & Background Vocals
- Joe Walsh - Guitar
- Billy Boy Arnold - guitar, vocals
- Charley Musselwhite - harmonica
- Jeff Baxter - guitar
- Sam Moore - vocals
- Eddie Floyd - vocals
- Syl Johnson - vocals
- Sergei Varonov - vocals
