= Best of The Blues Brothers =

Greatest hits album by The Blues Brothers
- Released: November 30, 1981
- Length: 35:22
- Label: Atlantic
- Producer: Bob Tischler, except track 7 by Bob Tischler & Paul Shaffer

The Blues Brothers chronology
Made in America (1980)	Best of The Blues Brothers (1981)	Everybody Needs the Blues Brothers (1988)

Professional ratings
Review scores
Source	Rating
AllMusic	4/5 stars

Best of the Blues Brothers is the fourth and final Blues Brothers album released before John Belushi's death in 1982. It is the first compilation album by the band and it was released by Atlantic Records on November 30, 1981. Along with tracks from the first three albums, Briefcase Full of Blues, The Blues Brothers: Music from the Soundtrack and Made in America, it includes unreleased live versions of "Everybody Needs Somebody to Love", "Rubber Biscuit", and a new song, "Expressway to Your Heart". The album was remixed by Steve Jordan and Donald “Duck” Dunn. Belushi’s wife, Judith Jacklin, designed the sleeve.

A special feature on The Best of John Belushi DVD shows Dan Aykroyd and John Belushi promoting the album on The Today Show. In that segment, they lament the fact that Tom Malone was accidentally left off the credits of the album.

== Track listing ==
All tracks recorded live, except tracks 4 & 8

1. "Expressway to Your Heart" (Gamble & Huff) – 3:23
  - A Top 10 hit by The Soul Survivors in 1967; recorded by Booker T. and the M.G.'s in 1968.
2. "Everybody Needs Somebody to Love" (Burke, Berns, Wexler) – 2:36
  - A different version than on The Blues Brothers: Music from the Soundtrack
3. "I Don't Know" (Mabon) – 4:16
4. "She Caught the Katy" (Taj Mahal, Rachell) – 4:12
  - Opening theme to The Blues Brothers, originally by Taj Mahal
5. "Soul Man" (Hayes, Porter) – 3:03
6. "Rubber Biscuit" (Charlie Johnson, Levy) – 3:25
  - A different version than on Briefcase Full of Blues
7. "Goin' Back to Miami" (Cochran) – 3:33
  - Edited
8. "Gimme Some Lovin'" (Davis, M. Winwood, S. Winwood) – 3:07
9. "'B' Movie Boxcar Blues" (McClinton) – 4:08
10. "Flip, Flop & Fly" (Calhoun, Turner) – 3:39

== Personnel ==
- Elwood Blues – backing vocals, harmonica; lead vocals on track 6, co-lead vocals on track 1
- "Joliet" Jake Blues – lead vocals; backing vocals on track 6
- Steve "The Colonel" Cropper – guitar
- Donald "Duck" Dunn – bass guitar
- Murphy "Murph" Dunne – keyboards, electric piano, Wurlitzer
- Willie "Too Big" Hall – drums on tracks 4, 8
- Steve "Getdwa" Jordan – drums, background vocals
- Lou "Blue Lou" Marini – tenor saxophone, alto saxophone
- Matt "Guitar" Murphy – lead guitar
- Alan "Mr. Fabulous" Rubin – trumpet
- Tom "Bones" Malone – trombone, horn arrangements
- Tom "Triple Scale" Scott – tenor and alto saxophones
- Paul "The Shiv" Shaffer – keyboards, piano, background vocals, music director

== Certifications ==
Region	Certification	Certified units/sales
Spain (PROMUSICAE)	Gold	50,000^{^}
^{^} Shipments figures based on certification alone.
