= The Blues Brothers =

American blues and soul band

- Elwood and Jake Blues and the Bluesmobile, 1980

Background information
- Origin: Calumet City, Illinois, U.S.
- Genres: Blues; Rhythm and blues; Soul; Rock and roll; Jump blues; Jazz; Country music
- Years active: 1978–1982; 1988–present
- Label: Atlantic
- Members: Elwood J. Blues; Zee Blues; Blues Brothers Band: Lou Marini; Alan Rubin; Jonny Rosch; Eddie Floyd; Jake Blues; Donald "Duck" Dunn; Steve "The Colonel" Cropper; Steve Jordan; Willie Hall; Tom Malone; Matt Murphy; Paul Shaffer; Murphy Dunne; Tom Scott; "Mighty Mack" McTeer; Larry Thurston; Tommy McDonnell; Robb McDonnell
- Website: bluesbrothersofficialsite.com

The Blues Brothers (known formally as "The Fabulous Blues Brothers Show Band and Revue") are an American blues and soul revue band founded in 1978 by comedians Dan Aykroyd and John Belushi, who met and began collaborating as original cast members of Saturday Night Live. The band was primarily a blues, rhythm and blues, and soul music band, but also played other related classic American genres such as jump blues, country music, jazz, and rock and roll.

The Blues Brothers Musical Revue consisted of lead vocalist "Joliet" Jake Blues (Belushi) and his brother, Elwood (Aykroyd), who played a harmonica that he carried onstage in a briefcase handcuffed to his wrist. The duo were usually dressed in matching black suits, black pencil ties, black trilby hats and sunglasses. The band itself was carefully constructed, and made up of experienced musicians of the time, including Steve "The Colonel" Cropper, Donald "Duck" Dunn, Matt "Guitar" Murphy, "Blue" Lou Marini, Tom "Bones" Malone, and Alan "Mr. Fabulous" Rubin.

The act debuted as musical guest on the April 22, 1978, episode of Saturday Night Live, hosted by comedian Steve Martin. After recruiting a full band, the group opened for Martin during a residency at the Universal Amphitheatre in September 1978. Recordings from that performance were released on November 28 as a live album, Briefcase Full of Blues. The album rose to the top of the charts and was a platinum seller. Several subsequent albums followed. The act opened for the Grateful Dead at the closing of Winterland Arena in San Francisco, and gained further fame after spawning the comedy film The Blues Brothers in 1980. They remain the most successful blues revue act ever.

Belushi died in 1982, but the Blues Brothers continued to perform with a rotation of guest singers and other band members. The band re-formed in 1988 for a world tour and again in 1998 for the sequel film Blues Brothers 2000.

== Band history ==
=== Origins ===
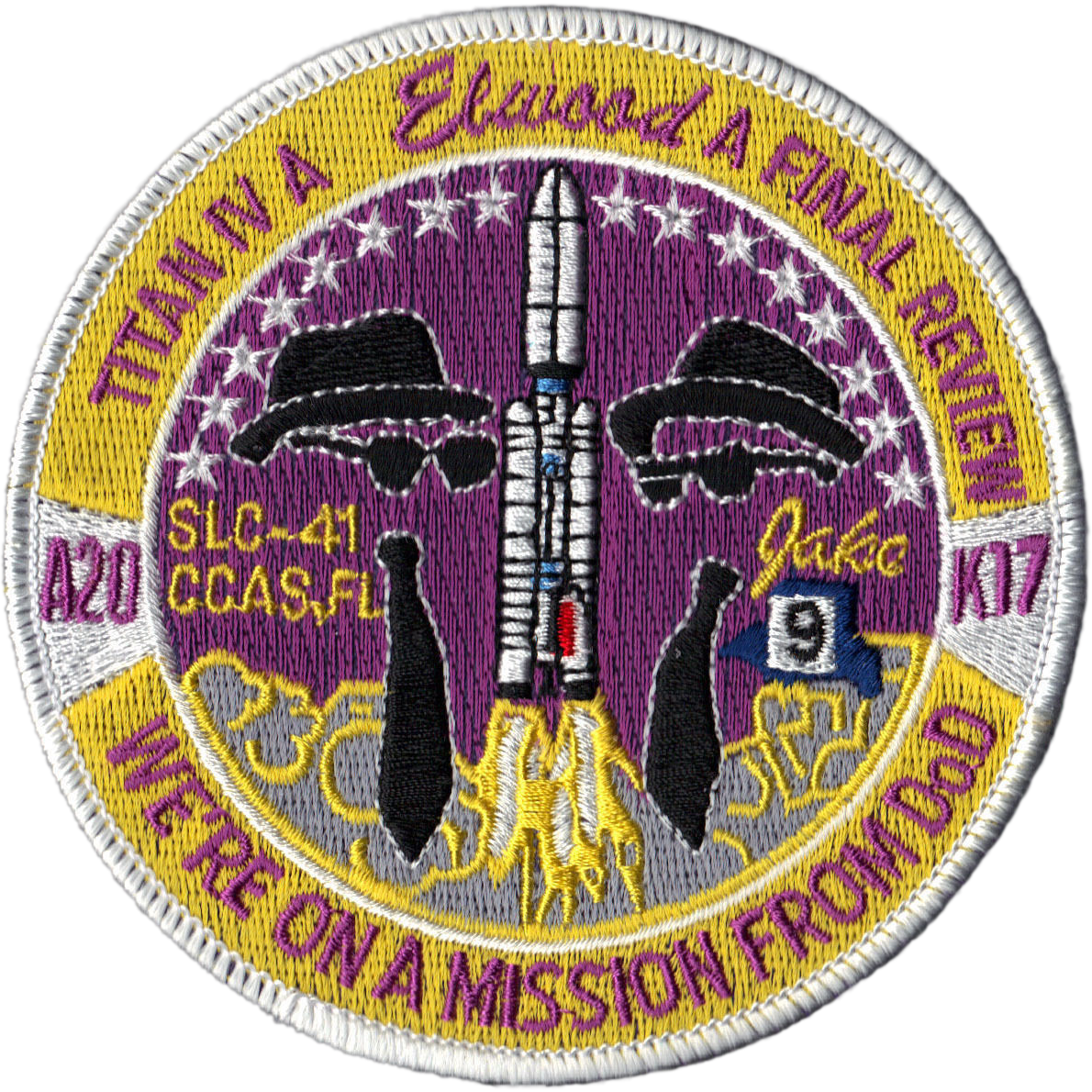
The Blues Brothers featured on the National Reconnaissance Office launch number 7 (NROL-7) mission patch

The genesis of the Blues Brothers was a January 17, 1976, Saturday Night Live sketch. In it, "Howard Shore and his All-Bee Band" play the Slim Harpo song "I'm a King Bee", with Belushi singing and Aykroyd playing harmonica, dressed in the bee costumes they wore for "The Killer Bees" sketches. In 1978, guitarist Arlen Roth was performing on SNL with Art Garfunkel, who was that week's host of the show. Before the actual live show, Belushi and Aykroyd asked Roth and others to join them onstage in the outfits that would later become the Blues Brothers' look. Roth taught Belushi the lyrics to "Rocket 88" so they could perform it that night. This was also discussed on Aykroyd's "Elwood's Bluesmobile" radio show, when Roth was interviewed about his Slide Guitar Summit album, and the song "Rocket 88".

Following tapings of SNL, it was popular among cast members and the weekly hosts to attend Aykroyd's Holland Tunnel Blues bar, which he had rented not long after joining the cast. Aykroyd and Belushi filled a jukebox with songs from Sam & Dave, punk band the Viletones and others. Belushi bought an amplifier and they kept some musical instruments there for anyone who wanted to jam. It was at the bar that Aykroyd and Ron Gwynne wrote and developed the story which Aykroyd turned into the draft screenplay for the Blues Brothers movie, better known as the "tome", because it contained so many pages.

It was also at the bar that Aykroyd introduced Belushi to the blues. An interest soon became a fascination, and it was not long before the two began singing with local blues bands. Jokingly, SNL band leader Howard Shore suggested they call themselves "The Blues Brothers". In an April 1988, interview he gave to the Chicago Sun-Times, Aykroyd said the Blues Brothers act borrowed from Sam and Dave and others; the Sun-Times quoted him as explaining: "Well, obviously, the duo thing and the dancing, but the hats came from John Lee Hooker. The suits came from the concept that when you were a jazz player in the '40s, '50s '60s, to look straight, you had to wear a suit."

The band was modeled in part on Aykroyd's experience with the Downchild Blues Band, one of the first professional blues bands in Canada, with whom Aykroyd played on occasion. (Note: Aykroyd played with Downchild in the fall of 2009, during the band's 40th anniversary tour: "...when one thinks of blues music in Canada, the first name that springs to mind is DOWNCHILD. It's been 40 years since Donnie 'Mr. Downchild' Walsh and his late brother Hock, formed the renowned group that would be the inspiration for the world famous Blues Brothers. DOWNCHILD plans to celebrate this anniversary in style, with some very special friends—including blues brother and movie icon DAN AYKROYD." When the Blues Brothers played the Casino Rama in 2005, Donnie "Mr. Downchild" Walsh appeared as their guest.) Aykroyd encountered the band in the early 1970s, around the time of his attendance at Carleton University in Ottawa, Ontario, Canada, and where his interest in the blues developed through attending and occasionally performing at Ottawa's Le Hibou Coffee House. As Aykroyd described it:

So I grew up (in Ottawa), in this capital city. My parents used to work for the government, and I went to elementary school, high school, and the university in the city. And there was a place on Sussex Drive (Sussex Drive is where the Prime Minister's house is, right below Parliament Hill), and there was a little club there called Le Hibou, which in French means 'the owl.' And it was run by a gentleman named Harvey Glatt, and he brought every, and I mean every blues star that you or I would ever have wanted to have seen through Ottawa in the late '50s, well I guess more late '60s sort of, in around the Newport jazz rediscovery. I was going to Le Hibou and hearing James Cotton, Otis Spann, Pinetop Perkins and Muddy Waters. I actually jammed behind Muddy Waters. S. P. Leary left the drum kit one night, and Muddy said 'anybody out there play drums? I don't have a drummer.' And I walked on stage and we started, I don't know, "Little Red Rooster", something. He said 'keep that beat going, you make Muddy feel good.' And I heard Howlin' Wolf (Chester Burnett). Many, many times I saw Howlin' Wolf. And of course Buddy Guy, Buddy Guy and Junior Wells, Sonny Terry and Brownie McGhee. So I was exposed to all of these players, playing there as part of this scene to service the academic community in Ottawa, a very well-educated community. Had I lived in a different town I don't think that this would have happened, because it was just the confluence of educated government workers, and then also all the colleges in the area, Ottawa University, Carleton, and all the schools—these people were interested in blues culture.

The Toronto-based Downchild Blues Band, co-founded in 1969 by two brothers, Donnie and Richard "Hock" Walsh, served as an inspiration for the two Blues Brothers characters. Aykroyd modeled Elwood Blues in part on Donnie Walsh, a harmonica player and guitarist, while Belushi's Jake Blues character was modeled after Hock Walsh, Downchild's lead singer, and Curtis Salgado. In their first album, Briefcase Full of Blues (1978), Aykroyd and Belushi featured three well-known Downchild songs closely associated with Hock Walsh's vocal style: "I've Got Everything I Need (Almost)", written by Donnie Walsh, "Shotgun Blues", co-written by Donnie and Hock Walsh, and "Flip, Flop and Fly", co-written and originally popularized by Big Joe Turner. All three songs were on Downchild's second album, Straight Up (1973), with "Flip, Flop and Fly" becoming the band's most successful single, in 1974.

Belushi's budding interest in the blues solidified in October 1977 when he was in Eugene, Oregon, filming National Lampoon's Animal House. He went to a local hotel to hear 25-year-old blues singer/harmonica player Curtis Salgado. After the show, Belushi and Salgado talked about the blues for hours. Belushi found Salgado's enthusiasm infectious. In an interview at the time with the Eugene Register-Guard, he said:

I was growing sick of rock and roll, it was starting to bore me ... and I hated disco, so I needed some place to go. I hadn't heard much blues before. It felt good.

In an interview with Crawdaddy he added:

I couldn't stop playing the stuff! I bought hundreds of records and singles ... I walked around playing that shit all the time. And then I knew Danny had played the harp in Canada, and I always could sing, so we created the Blues Brothers.

Salgado lent him some albums by Floyd Dixon, Charles Brown, Johnny "Guitar" Watson, and others. Belushi was hooked.

In July 2024, John Belushi's Facebook page revealed that Belushi's wife Judith had a prominent role in the development of the Blues Brothers, stating that "Her unwavering dedication and creative genius alongside Dan Aykroyd and John Belushi gave birth to ‘The Blues Brothers."

Belushi began to join Salgado on stage, singing the Floyd Dixon song "Hey Bartender" on a few occasions, and using Salgado's humorous alternate lyrics to "I Don't Know":

I said Woman, you going to walk a mile for a Camel
or are you going to make like Mr. Chesterfield and satisfy?
She said, that all depends on what you're packing,
regular or king-size.
Then she pulled out my Jim Beam and to her surprise
It was every bit as hard as my Canadian Club

These lyrics were used in the band's debut performance on SNL.

=== Band formation ===
With the help of pianist-arranger Paul Shaffer, Belushi and Aykroyd started assembling a collection of studio talents to form their own band. These included SNL band members saxophonist "Blue" Lou Marini and trombonist-saxophonist Tom Malone, who had previously played in Blood, Sweat & Tears. At Shaffer's suggestion, guitarist Steve Cropper and bassist Donald "Duck" Dunn, the powerhouse combo from Booker T. & the M.G.'s and subsequently almost every hit out of Memphis' Stax Records during the 1960s, were signed as well.

Belushi wanted a powerful trumpet player and a hot blues guitarist, so Juilliard-trained trumpeter Alan Rubin was brought in, as was guitarist Matt "Guitar" Murphy, who had performed with many blues legends.

For the brothers' look, Belushi borrowed John Lee Hooker's trademark Ray-Ban Wayfarer sunglasses and soul patch.

=== Sound ===
In Stories Behind the Making of The Blues Brothers, a 1998 documentary included on some DVD editions of the first Blues Brothers film, Cropper noted that some of his peers thought that he and the other musicians backing the Blues Brothers were selling out to Hollywood or using a gimmick to make some quick money. Cropper responded by stating that he thought Belushi was as good as (or even better than) many of the singers he had backed; he also noted that Belushi had, early in his career, briefly been a professional drummer, and had an especially keen sense of rhythm.

=== Albums, early gigs, character backgrounds ===
The Blues Brothers recorded their first album, Briefcase Full of Blues, in 1978 while opening for comedian Steve Martin at Los Angeles' Universal Amphitheatre. The album reached #1 on the Billboard 200, went double platinum, and featured Top 40 hit recordings of Sam & Dave's "Soul Man" and The Chips' "Rubber Biscuit".

The album liner notes fleshed out the fictional backstory of Jake and Elwood, having them growing up in a Roman Catholic orphanage in Rock Island, Illinois and learning the blues from a janitor named Curtis. Their blood brotherhood was sealed by cutting their middle fingers with a string said to come from the guitar of Elmore James.

The band, along with the New Riders of the Purple Sage, opened for the Grateful Dead for the final show at Winterland, New Year's Eve 1978.

With the film came the soundtrack album, which was the band's first studio album. "Gimme Some Lovin'" was a Top 40 hit and the band toured to promote the film. The tour began on June 27, 1980 at Poplar Creek Music Theater. The tour also led to a third album (and second live album), Made in America, recorded at the Universal Amphitheatre in 1980. The track "Who's Making Love" peaked at No 39. It was the last recording the band would make with Belushi's Jake Blues.

Belushi's wife, Judith Jacklin, and his friend, Tino Insana, wrote a book, Blues Brothers: Private, that further fleshed out the Blues Brothers' universe and gave a back story for the first movie.

In 1981, Best of the Blues Brothers was released, with a previously unreleased track, a version of The Soul Survivors' "Expressway to Your Heart", and alternate live recordings of "Everybody Needs Somebody to Love" and "Rubber Biscuit"; this album would be the first of several compilations and hits collections issued over the years. A 1998 British CD compilation, The Complete Blues Brothers, exclusively featured The Lamont Cranston Band's "Excuse Moi Mon Cheri", from the L.A. Briefcase recordings, originally available only as the b-side to the "Soul Man" 45 rpm single.

On March 5, 1982, Belushi died in Hollywood of an accidental overdose of heroin and cocaine.

After Belushi's death, updated versions of the Blues Brothers have performed on SNL and for charitable and political causes. Aykroyd has been accompanied by Jim Belushi and John Goodman in character as "Zee" Blues and "Mighty Mack" McTeer. The copyright owners have also authorized some copycat acts to perform under the Blues Brothers name; one such act performs regularly at the Universal Studios Florida theme park in Orlando, Florida and Universal Studios Hollywood.

In 1995, the Band collaborated with the Italian singer Zucchero Fornaciari, who had been invited to the event in memory of John Belushi's 46th birthday. After a concert together, they registered the videoclip of the Zucchero song "Per colpa di chi?" at the House of Blues. In 1997, an animated sitcom with Jake and Elwood was planned, but scrapped after only eight episodes were produced. Peter Aykroyd and Jim Belushi replaced their brothers as the voices of Elwood and Jake.

To promote Blues Brothers 2000 (1998), Dan Aykroyd, Jim Belushi and John Goodman performed at the Super Bowl XXXI halftime show, along with ZZ Top and James Brown. The performance was preceded with a faux news report stating the Blues Brothers had escaped custody and were on their way to the Louisiana Superdome.

Aykroyd has continued to be an active proponent of blues music and parlayed this avocation into foundation and partial ownership of the House of Blues franchise, a national chain of nightclubs. In Italy the franchise is now owned by Zucchero, who used the brand during the tour promoting his album Black Cat of 2016.

Jim Belushi toured with the band for a short time as "Zee Blues", and recorded the album Blues Brothers and Friends: Live from Chicago's House of Blues with Dan Aykroyd. Jim would later reunite with Aykroyd to record yet another album, not as the Blues Brothers but as themselves: Belushi/Aykroyd – Have Love Will Travel (Big Men-Big Music).

In 2004, the showband revue The Blues Brothers Revival premiered in Chicago. The story was about Elwood trying to rescue Jake from an eternity in limbo/purgatory. The revue was written and composed with approval and permission from both the John Belushi estate (including his widow, Judith Belushi-Pisano) and Dan Aykroyd.

The Blues Brothers featuring Elwood and Zee regularly perform at House of Blues venues and various casinos across North America. They are usually backed by Jim Belushi's Sacred Hearts Band. The Original Blues Brothers Band tours the world regularly. Lou Marini currently is the only original member still in the band with the death of Steve Cropper in 2025. The lead singers are Bobby "Sweet Soul" Harden, Rob "The Honeydripper" Papparozi and Tommy "Pipes" McDonnel. They are occasionally joined by Eddie Floyd.

Aykroyd most recently hosted a radio show as his character Elwood Blues on the weekly House of Blues Radio Hour, heard nationwide on the Dial Global Radio Network until 2017. It has now been succeeded by The Sam T. Blues Revue, which airs Wednesday nights on KHBT.

In 2025, a new Blues Brothers live album titled The Lost Recordings was released with Z2 Comics. The recording was found on a tape hidden in Belushi's old briefcase and was released alongside an official graphic novel, written by Stella Aykroyd and Luke Pisano.

== Films ==
=== The Blues Brothers ===
In 1980, The Blues Brothers, directed by John Landis, was released. It featured car chases involving the Bluesmobile and musical performances by Aretha Franklin, James Brown, Cab Calloway, Ray Charles and John Lee Hooker. The story is set in and around Chicago and Wauconda, Illinois. It is a tale of redemption for the paroled convict Jake Blues and his brother Elwood, who after a visit to Sister Mary Stigmata (Kathleen Freeman), otherwise known as "The Penguin" at the Catholic orphanage where they grew up, choose to take on a "mission from God" and re-form their old blues band in order to raise funds to save the orphanage. Along the way, the brothers are targeted by a "mystery woman" (Carrie Fisher) and chased by the Illinois law enforcement officers, a country and western band called the Good Ol' Boys, and "Illinois Nazis". The film grossed $57 million domestically in its theatrical release, making it the 10th highest-grossing movie of 1980, and grossed an additional $58 million in foreign release.

=== Blues Brothers 2000 ===
With Landis again directing, the sequel to The Blues Brothers was made in 1998. It fared considerably worse than its predecessor with fans and critics, though it is more ambitious in terms of musical performances by the band and has a more extensive roster of guest artists than the first film. The story picks up 18 years later with Elwood being released from prison, and learning that his brother has died. He is prevailed upon to mentor a 10-year-old boy named Buster Blues (J. Evan Bonifant). Elwood again sets about the task of reuniting his band. He recruits two new singers, "Mighty" Mack McTeer (John Goodman) and Curtis' son, Illinois State Police commander Cabel "Cab" Chamberlain (Joe Morton). All the original band members are found, as well as some performers from the first film, including Aretha Franklin and James Brown. There are dozens of other guest performers, including Eric Clapton, Steve Winwood, Junior Wells, Lonnie Brooks, Eddie Floyd, Wilson Pickett, Isaac Hayes, Sam Moore, Taj Mahal and Jonny Lang in an all-star supergroup led by B.B. King called the Louisiana Gator Boys. On the run from the state troopers, local police officers, county sheriffs' deputies, and FBI agents, Russian mafia and Neo-Confederates, the band eventually ends up in Louisiana, where they enter a Battle of the Bands against the Louisiana Gator Boys, overseen by a voodoo practitioner named Queen Moussette (Erykah Badu). During a song by the Blues Brothers (a Caribbean number called "Funky Nassau"), a character played by Paul Shaffer asks to cut in on keyboards, which Murph allows. This marks the first time in a film that the Blues Brothers play with their original keyboardist.

== Discography ==
=== Soundtrack albums ===
Year	Title	Peak chart positions	Label
Year	Title	US	Label
1980	The Blues Brothers	13	Atlantic
1998	Blues Brothers 2000	12	Uptown/Universal

=== Live albums ===
Year	Title	Peak chart positions	Label
Year	Title	US	Label
1978	Briefcase Full of Blues	1	Atlantic
1980	Made in America	49	Atlantic
1997	Blues Brothers and Friends: Live from Chicago's House of Blues	—	(House of Blues)
2025	The Lost Recordings	—	Z2

=== Compilation albums ===
Year	Title	Peak chart positions	Label
Year	Title	US	Label
1981	Best of the Blues Brothers	143	Atlantic
1983	Dancin' wid da Blues Brothers	—	Atlantic
1988	Everybody Needs Blues Brothers	—	Atlantic
1992	The Definitive Collection	—	Atlantic
1995	The Very Best of The Blues Brothers	—	Atlantic/EastWest
1998	The Blues Brothers Complete	—	Atlantic/EastWest
2003	The Essentials	—	Atlantic
2005	Gimme Some Lovin' & Other Hits	—	Flashback Records
2008	American Music Legends	—	Rhino Custom Products/Cracker Barrel Old Country Store
2017	The Blues Brothers: An Introduction	—	Atlantic Records/Rhino Records
2017	Drop the Needle on the Hits: The Best of the Blues Brothers	—	Rhino Records

=== Singles ===
Year	Single	Peak chart positions	Album
Year	Single	US	Album
1979	"Soul Man"	14	Briefcase Full of Blues (1978)
1979	"Rubber Biscuit"	37	Briefcase Full of Blues (1978)
1980	"Gimme Some Lovin'"	18	The Blues Brothers: Music from the Soundtrack (1980)
1981	"Who's Making Love"	39	Made in America (1980)
1981	"Going Back to Miami"	108	Made in America (1980)
1998	"Can't Turn You Loose"	—	Blues Brothers 2000 (1998)
1998	"Funky Nassau"	—	Blues Brothers 2000 (1998)

=== Bootlegs ===
Year	Title	Peak chart positions	Label
Year	Title	US	Label
1979	Live At The Radio And Records Convention In L.A.	—	—
1980	The Blues Brothers - Unofficial "Deluxe" Soundtrack	—	—
1980	Live at The Universal Amphitheater (John Belushi's last concert)	—	—
1996	Live on New Year's Eve (1978)	—	ITM Media
2017	The Closing of Winterland 31st December 1978	—	Roxvox (Soulfood)
2021	Real Tight! (Live San Francisco 1978 KSAN)	—	Wolftree

=== Elwood Blues ===
- 1995 – Blues Traveler: Blues Roll Me Baby (Live New Orleans '95) EP

=== The Elwood Blues Revue ===
Live albums

- 1988 – Atlantic Records 40th Anniversary (Atlantic) (as The Elwood Blues Revue)

Other appearances

- 1988 – The Great Outdoors soundtrack (Atlantic) (as The Elwood Blues Revue)
- 1992 – Nothing but Trouble (Music from the Motion Picture Soundtrack) (Warner Bros / WEA) (as The Elwood Blues Revue)

=== The Blues Brothers Band ===
Studio albums

- 1992 – Red, White & Blues (WEA)
- 2017 – The Last Shade of Blue Before Black (The Original Blues Brothers Band, Severn Records)

Singles & EPs

- 1990 – Sweet Home Chicago / Soul Man (WEA)
- 1992 – Never Found a Girl / Red, White & Blues (WEA)
- 1993 – Australian Tour Sampler - April 1993 – EP (WEA)

Live albums

- 1990 – The Blues Brothers Band Live in Montreux (WEA)

Bootlegs

- 1987 – Otis, Onions & the Blues (with Booker T. & the MGs) (Green Hell Records GmbH & CoKG)
- 1992 – Blues For You - Live In Montreux 1992
- 2004 – Jazz San Javier 2004

=== The Blues Brothers Horns ===
- 1995 – Jesse "Wild Bill" Austin: Baby's Back (Roesch Records) (Lou Marini, Alan Rubin & Birch Johnson)
- 1997 – Eddie King: Another Cow's Dead (Roesch Records) ( Lou Marini, Alan Rubin & Birch Johnson plus Ronnie Cuber)
- 2000 – Matt "Guitar" Murphy: Lucky Charm (Roesch Records) (Lou Marini, Alan Rubin & Birch Johnson)
- 2014 – Johnny Winter: Step Back (Megaforce) (Lou Marini & Tom Malone)

== Band members ==
=== Original lineup ===
While not all members appeared in the original film, the full band included:

- "Joliet" Jake E. Blues – lead vocals
- Elwood J. Blues – harmonica, vocals
- Steve "The Colonel" Cropper – lead and rhythm guitar (former Booker T & the M.G.'s)
- Matt "Guitar" Murphy – lead and rhythm guitar (Howlin' Wolf, other artists)
- Donald "Duck" Dunn – bass guitar (former Booker T & the M.G.'s)
- Paul "The Shiv" Shaffer – keyboards, arranger (Saturday Night Live Band, does not appear in the film)
- Murphy Dunne – keyboards, tambourine (appears in the film due to Paul Shaffer's commitment to perform with Gilda Radner in Gilda Live!, and toured with the band in the summer of 1980)
- Alan "Mr. Fabulous" Rubin – trumpet (Saturday Night Live Band)
- "Blue" Lou Marini – saxophone (Saturday Night Live Band)
- Tom "Triple Scale" Scott – saxophone (does not appear in the film, but played on the soundtrack)
- Tom "Bones" Malone – trombone, trumpet, saxophone (Saturday Night Live Band)
- Birch "Crimson Slide" Johnson – trombone (does not appear in the film)
- Willie "Too Big" Hall – drums, percussion (formerly of the Bar-Kays, Isaac Hayes' band, appears in the film)
- Steve "Getdwa" Jordan – drums, percussion (Saturday Night Live Band, appears only on the albums)

=== Other members ===
At times, other members have included:

- Jim Belushi (as "Brother" Zee Blues) – lead vocals
- John Goodman (as "Mighty Mack" McTeer) – co-lead vocals
- Buster Blues – harmonica, co-lead vocals (acted by J. Evan Bonifant in Blues Brothers 2000, actual harmonica recorded by John Popper)
- Joe Morton (as Cabel "Cab" Chamberlain) – vocals
- Cab Calloway – vocals (d. 1994)
- Larry "T" Thurston – vocals
- Eddie "Knock on Wood" Floyd – vocals
- Sam "Soul Man" Moore – vocals
- Bobby "Sweet Soul" Harden – vocals
- Tommy "Pipes" McDonnell – harmonica, vocals
- Rob "The Honeydripper" Paparozzi – harmonica, vocals
- Don Gregory Blues - vocals
- Andrea Mingardi - harmonica, vocals
- Leon "The Lion" Pendarvis – piano, vocals, arranger
- David "Spin" Spinozza – guitar
- Danny "G-Force" Gottlieb – drums
- Jimmy "Jimmy B" Biggins – saxophone
- "Dizzy" Daniel Moorehead – saxophone
- Anthony "Rusty" Cloud – clavinet, Wurlitzer, piano and organ
- Eric "The Red" Udel – bass
- John "Smokin" Tropea – guitar
- Jimmy "Mack" Hodge – guitar
- Lee "Funky Time" Finkelstein – drums
- Steve Potts – drums
- Anton Fig – drums
- Larry "Trombonius Maximus" Farrell – trombone
- Alto Reed – saxophone
- Steve "Catfish" Howard – trumpet
- Jonny "The Rock & Roll Doctor" Rosch – vocals, harmonica
- Francisco Simon – guitar
- Cale Hawkins – piano

== See also ==
- Recurring Saturday Night Live characters and sketches
