= Blues Brothers 2000 =

1998 film by John Landis

- Theatrical release poster
- Directed by: John Landis
- Written by: Dan Aykroyd; John Landis
- Produced by: Dan Aykroyd; Leslie Belzberg; John Landis
- Starring: Dan Aykroyd; John Goodman; Joe Morton; J. Evan Bonifant; Aretha Franklin; James Brown; B. B. King; The Blues Brothers Band
- Cinematography: David Herrington
- Edited by: Dale Beldin
- Music by: Paul Shaffer
- Distributed by: Universal Pictures
- Release date: February 6, 1998
- Running time: 123 minutes
- Country: United States
- Language: English
- Budget: $30 million
- Box office: $32.1 million

Blues Brothers 2000 is a 1998 American musical action comedy film directed by John Landis from a screenplay written by Landis and Dan Aykroyd, both of whom were also producers, and starring Aykroyd and John Goodman. The film serves as a sequel to the 1980 film The Blues Brothers. It also includes cameo appearances by various musicians.

The film was released by Universal Pictures on February 6, 1998, to mixed reviews from critics. It was a box office bomb, grossing $32 million on a budget of $30 million.

== Plot ==
Elwood Blues is released from prison after serving eighteen years for the events of the previous film and is informed that his brother, "Joliet" Jake Blues, has died. He is picked up by Matara, a friend who works for his former drummer Willie Hall, who wants to help him get back on his feet.

Before meeting up with Willie, Elwood asks to be dropped off to see Mother Mary Stigmata who is now working at a hospital after the orphanage was closed. She informs him that his old friend and father figure Curtis has also died but fathered an illegitimate son named Cabel Chamberlain, who is an Illinois State Police commander, and introduces him to an orphan named Buster to suggest mentoring him.

Against Stigmata's advice, Elwood tracks Cabel down at his police headquarters to inform him of his real father and asks him to join The Blues Brothers Band, which he plans on reforming. Cabel, upset by the news and offended by the suggestion to join him after seeing Elwood's and Jake's criminal histories, throws him out of the building, where Buster steals Cabel's wallet; it contains enough money for Elwood to purchase a new Bluesmobile.

Elwood and Buster begin tracking down members of the former band to recruit them from their current jobs. Willie runs a strip club and joins after it is burned down by the Russian mafia because Elwood enlisted the help of Willie's barman, "Mighty" Mack McTeer, to try to convince them to leave the club alone, by getting two of the mobsters drunk and leaving them bound and gagged in an alley. Mack also joins the band as well, along with former members Matt "Guitar" Murphy who joins again at the advice of his wife, with whom he now runs a Mercedes-Benz dealership, as well as saxophonist "Blue Lou" Marini. Three members work at a radio station and quickly agree to join and finally, Murphy Dunne joins after his boss Mr. Pickett at a call center gives him permission.

The newly reformed band uses their old agent to book them a show. On the way to it, they are followed by Cabel and the Indiana State Police, who are now looking for Elwood for stealing Cabel's wallet earlier and believing that he has kidnapped Buster. While avoiding the Kentucky State Police and FBI, Elwood interrupts a Neo-Confederates meeting, unintentionally destroying their boat full of explosives they planned to use.

The band arrives at the Cynthana fairgrounds show to find they have been mistakenly booked as a Bluegrass band, but perform anyway. Afterwards, they evade capture by the FBI and Mississippi Highway Patrol, but they catch up with them at a tent revival in Sharkey County where Reverend Cleophus James is preaching. Before Cabel can arrest them, he has an epiphany brought on by Reverend Cleophus that he should join the band instead of being a police officer. The band evades capture once more, now with Cabel joining them, who the police believe is brainwashed.

The band continues on to their next booking, an audition for a Battle of the Bands put on by Queen Mousette, who Mack informs is allegedly a 130-year-old voodoo witch. Queen Mousette requests the band play something Caribbean; when Elwood explains they don't play Caribbean music, she casts a spell on them to play anyway. She accepts the band into the battle, however, Elwood, Mack and Cabel are turned into statues.

At the show, Queen Mousette undoes the spell to allow the Blues Brothers to play against the Louisiana Gator Boys, a supergroup of blues musicians who win the battle. After the battle, the show is interrupted by the arrival of the Russian mafia and Neo-Confederates from earlier; they are turned into rats by Queen Mousette. The Louisiana State Police and Lt. Elizondo arrive, but stand down after Cabel informs them that he is okay. Elwood suggests that the two bands jam together on stage. When Mother Mary Stigmata and FBI agents arrives, Elwood uses the performance as cover to say goodbye to Cabel and Mack and escape with Buster, with the hundreds of state troopers, local police officers, county sheriffs' deputies, and FBI agents giving police chase Bluesmobile.

== Cast and characters ==
=== Bands and musical guests ===
==== The Blues Brothers Band ====
- Dan Aykroyd as Elwood J. Blues – harmonica and vocals
- John Goodman as Mack "Mighty Mack" McTeer – lead vocals
- Joe Morton as Commander Cabel Chamberlain / Cab Blues – vocals
- J. Evan Bonifant as Buster "Scribbles" Blues – vocals and harmonica (harmonica recorded by John Popper)
- Steve Cropper as Steve "The Colonel" Cropper – rhythm guitar and vocals
- Donald "Duck" Dunn as Donald "Duck" Dunn – bass guitar
- Murphy Dunne as Murphy "Murph" Dunne – keyboards
- Willie Hall as Willie "Too Big" Hall – drums and percussion
- Tom Malone as Tom "Bones" Malone – trombone, tenor saxophone and vocals
- Lou Marini as Lou "Blue Lou" Marini – alto saxophone and tenor saxophone and vocals
- Matt Murphy as Matt "Guitar" Murphy – lead guitar
- Alan Rubin as Alan "Mr. Fabulous" Rubin – trumpet, percussion and vocals

==== Musical guests ====
- Erykah Badu as Queen Moussette
- Blues Traveler as Themselves
- Lonnie Brooks as Himself
- Eddie Floyd as Ed
- Aretha Franklin as Mrs. Murphy
- James Brown as Reverend Cleophus James
- Jonny Lang as Janitor
- Sam Moore as Reverend Morris
- Wilson Pickett as Mr. Pickett
- Junior Wells as Himself

==== The Louisiana Gator Boys ====
The Louisiana Gator Boys is a blues supergroup created for the film. They face The Blues Brothers in a Battle of the Bands. The band is composed of:

- Jeff "Skunk" Baxter – guitar
- Gary U.S. Bonds – vocals
- Eric Clapton – vocals and guitar
- Clarence Clemons – vocals, tenor saxophone and tambourine
- Jack DeJohnette – drums
- Bo Diddley – vocals and guitar
- Jon Faddis – trumpet
- Isaac Hayes – vocals
- Dr. John – vocals and piano
- B. B. King as Malvern Gasperon – vocals and guitar
- Tommy "Pipes" McDonnell – vocals
- Charlie Musselwhite – vocals and harmonica
- Billy Preston – vocals and synthesizer
- Lou Rawls – vocals
- Joshua Redman – tenor saxophone
- Paul Shaffer as Marco– keyboards
- Koko Taylor – vocals
- Travis Tritt – vocals and guitar
- Jimmie Vaughan – vocals and guitar
- Grover Washington Jr. – baritone saxophone
- Willie Weeks – bass guitar
- Steve Winwood – vocals and organ

Kathleen Freeman, Frank Oz, Steve Lawrence and Jeff Morris appeared in cameos, all reprising their roles from the original film as Mother Mary Stigmata, Warden, Maury Sline and Bob, respectively. Nia Peeples portrays a state police officer Lt. Elizondo, Darrell Hammond plays militia member Robertson, John Lyons plays a Russian thug and Shann Johnson plays Matara.

== Production ==
Shortly before John Belushi's death, a sequel to The Blues Brothers had been considered. John Landis revealed in an interview:

"We'd always intended for a sequel with John, but of course when he passed away, it was obvious we weren't going to do it. But Danny had been performing with John Goodman and Jimmy Belushi and the band, and he said, "You know, this is great, because this music is recognized now—let's do a movie." I said, "Great, sure, okay," and we wrote what I thought was a terrific script. Then Universal Studios eviscerated it. That was a strange experience, because the first thing they said was that it had to be PG, which meant they couldn't use profanity, which is basically cutting the Blues Brothers' nuts off. The first movie is an R-rated film, but there's no nudity or violence in it. It's just the language. Then they said, "You have to have a child, you have to have..." The bottom line was, the only way that movie was going to get made was to agree with everything they said. You know the difference between a brown-nose and a shithead? Depth perception. That's the only time I never really fought with the studio, because they didn't really want to make it. So we did every single thing they said. By the time we'd done that, the script was kind of homogenized and uninteresting. Danny said, "It's about the music. It's just about the music, John, so don't worry about it. We'll get the best people, and we'll make a great album, and get these people on film. We have to document these people." It's interesting, because, as much as I make fun of Danny, three or four of those guys have passed away since we made that movie. People say, "Okay, you've got Aretha Franklin, Ray Charles, James Brown, Cab Calloway, and John Lee Hooker in The Blues Brothers—who's in Blues Brothers 2000?" The answer? Everyone else. The first movie has five musical numbers, and the second movie has 18."

The film made it into the Guinness Book of Records for the biggest car pile-up, a record previously held by the original film. 63 cars were used in the scene after Elwood J. Blues (Dan Aykroyd) says to the band, "Don't look back." Inevitably, everyone looks back and sees the massive pile-up. Portions of this scene were filmed in Niagara Falls, Ontario. The original title for the film in earlier drafts was The Blues Brothers Meet The Voodoo Queen.

=== Casting ===
The film was originally intended to include Brother Zee Blues (Jim Belushi). But due to an already existing television deal where Belushi had been cast in the ABC drama Total Security, he was unable to appear and the script was altered to include Cab Blues (Joe Morton). This character's full name was Cabel Chamberlain as an homage to Cab Calloway, who died four years prior to the film's release. His character Curtis was revealed to have died in the film along with John Belushi's character Joliet Jake Blues. Several cast members from the original film reprised their roles, including Frank Oz, Jeff Morris, Steve Lawrence, Kathleen Freeman, Aretha Franklin and James Brown.

The Blues Brothers' original keyboardist, Paul Shaffer, had been committed to Gilda Radner's one-woman show on Broadway Gilda Live and was therefore unable to appear in the original film. He was replaced by actor-musician Murphy Dunne. Shaffer does appear in this one, taking a week off from Late Show with David Letterman to film his role as Queen Moussette (Erykah Badu)'s majordomo Marco and emcee of the Battle of the Bands (Warren Zevon took his place that week on David Letterman's show). Shaffer shaved his head for the role, a change in appearance he chose to retain permanently. During the "Funky Nassau" number, Shaffer in his character of Marco, asks to cut in on keyboards, which Murphy Dunne allows. This marks the first time on-screen that the Blues Brothers Band played with their original keyboardist.

== Release ==
The film was screened out of competition at the 1998 Cannes Film Festival.

=== Box office ===
The film grossed a little over $14 million in box office sales in North America.

=== Critical reception ===
On the review aggregator website Rotten Tomatoes, 47% of 47 critics' reviews are positive, with an average rating of 5.0/10. The website's consensus reads: "Braving onward without the late John Belushi, Blues Brothers 2000 gets the band back together with a spirited soundtrack, but a mission that's far less divine." Metacritic, which uses a weighted average, assigned the film a score of 48 out of 100, based on 23 critics, indicating "mixed or average" reviews. Audiences polled by CinemaScore gave the film an average grade of "B-" on an A+ to F scale.

It earned a D score from Entertainment Weekly. Roger Ebert of the Chicago Sun-Times gave it two out of four stars, writing, "Blues Brothers 2000 has a lot of good music in it. It would have had more if they'd left out the story, which would have been an excellent idea. The film is lame comedy surrounded by high-energy blues (and some pop, rock and country music)."

Despite the poor reception, Aykroyd remained proud of the film, saying in a 2024 interview with Rolling Stone, "the second movie's a small-g good accompaniment to the first. Erykah Badu's song was worth the price of admission. I'm glad we did that story, and I wish Jimmy [Belushi] had been in it, but everybody was good in it, and it was fun."

== Video game ==
A Blues Brothers 2000 video game was released for the Nintendo 64 on November 17, 2000, two years after the film's release. The plot involves Elwood as the main character going through different chapters and levels while trying to save the kidnapped members of the band one by one. Like the film on which it was based and the video game based on the original film, it was poorly received.

== Future ==
In a 2023 interview, Jim Belushi stated that Aykroyd had kept pitching him several ideas for a third film, such as a female-centric film where Elwood mentors a group called the Blues Sisters and a film where Elwood finds Jake's long-lost biological brother in Albania.
