= Red, White & Blues =

Studio album by The Blues Brothers
- Released: 1992
- Genre: R&B
- Label: Turnstyle

The Blues Brothers chronology
The Blues Brothers Band Live in Montreux (1990)	Red, White & Blues (1992)	The Definitive Collection (1992)

Red, White & Blues is the eighth album by The Blues Brothers, released in 1992. It is their first studio album, other than the soundtracks from the movies The Blues Brothers (1980) and Blues Brothers 2000 (1999). It is also the only album that contains original material, such as "Red, White & Blues", "Take You and Show You" and "Can't Play the Blues (In an Air-Conditioned Room)". The album was recorded at the Power Station studio in New York. Original band member Tom Malone had left the band the year before to join the Gil Evans orchestra and was replaced by Birch Johnson.

Professional ratings
Review scores
Source	Rating
AllMusic	2/5 stars

== Track listing ==
1. "You Got the Bucks" (L. Marini-P. Marini)– 3:30
2. "Red, White & Blues" (M. Moreno-A. Rubin-L. Pendarvis) – 3:55
3. "Can't Play the Blues (In an Air-Conditioned Room)" (R. Fagan-J. Kennedy)– 3:15
4. "Early in the Morning" (L. Jordan-D. Hartley-L. Hickman) – 3:39
5. "One Track Train" (S. Cropper-G. Nicholson) – 4:16
6. "Boogie Thing" (J. Cotton-M. Murphy)– 3:37
7. "Never Found a Girl" (Booker T. Jones-E. Floyd) – 5:51
8. "Trick Bag" (E. King) – 4:25
9. "Take You and Show You" (L. Pendarvis-B. Johnson) – 4:08
10. "Big Bird" (Booker T. Jones-E. Floyd) – 4:58

== Credits ==
- Elwood Blues – harmonica, backing vocals, lead vocals on track 2
- Steve "The Colonel" Cropper – guitar
- Donald "Duck" Dunn – bass guitar
- Lou "Blue Lou" Marini – tenor saxophone, alto saxophone
- Matt "Guitar" Murphy – lead guitar
- Alan "Mr. Fabulous" Rubin – trumpet
- Eddie Floyd – lead vocals
- Larry Thurston – lead vocals
- Danny "G-Force" Gottlieb – drums
- Birch Johnson – trombone
- Leon Pendarvis – keyboards, piano, backing vocals, musical director
- Carla Thomas – Backing vocals
