= The Blues Brothers Band Live in Montreux =

Live album by The Blues Brothers
- Released: 1990
- Recorded: Montreux Casino, July 12, 1989
- Producer: Tom Malone

The Blues Brothers chronology
Everybody Needs the Blues Brothers (1988)	The Blues Brothers Band Live in Montreux (1990)	Red, White & Blues (1992)

Professional ratings
Review scores
Source	Rating
AllMusic	3/5 stars

The Blues Brothers Band Live in Montreux is an album by The Blues Brothers band. It was released in 1990 on the heels of the band's reunion tour and it was the first album recorded by the band after the death of founding member John Belushi and the only one that does not feature Dan Aykroyd. Drummer Steve Jordan and keyboardist Paul Shaffer were not available to play, and were replaced respectively by Danny Gottlieb and Leon Pendarvis. Vocals duties were assigned to Eddie Floyd and Larry Thurston, who had been previously recruited by Matt Murphy for his short-lived solo outfit Matt "Guitar" Murphy Band. As with most other records by the band, the album was recorded live. Along with regular numbers from the Blues Brothers repertoire, it features material never performed before by the band like "Hold On, I'm Comin'", (which, in its original rendition by Sam & Dave, was part of the Blues Brothers film, although excluded from the soundtrack), "In the Midnight Hour", "The Thrill Is Gone", and two Eddie Floyd signature tunes, "Knock on Wood" and "Raise Your Hand". The album was produced by Tom Malone.

== Track listing ==
1. "Hold On, I'm Comin'"
2. "In the Midnight Hour"
3. "She Caught the Katy"
4. "The Thrill Is Gone"
5. "Can't Turn You Loose"
6. "Sweet Home Chicago"
7. "Knock on Wood"
8. "Raise Your Hand"
9. "Peter Gunn Theme"
10. "Soul Finger"
11. "Hey Bartender"
12. "Soul Man"
13. "Everybody Needs Somebody to Love" (not on L.P and Cassette)
14. "Green Onions" (not on L.P.and Cassette)

== Credits ==
- Eddie Floyd – lead vocals
- Larry Thurston – lead vocals
- Steve "The Colonel" Cropper – guitar
- Donald "Duck" Dunn – bass guitar
- Lou "Blue Lou" Marini – tenor saxophone, alto saxophone
- Matt "Guitar" Murphy – lead guitar
- Alan "Mr. Fabulous" Rubin – trumpet
- Tom Malone – trombone
- Danny Gottlieb – drums
- Leon Pendarvis – keyboards, piano, background vocals, music director
