= Larry Thurston =

American soul, R&B, and blues singer

Larry "T" Thurston is an American soul, R&B, and blues singer, who sang as the lead vocalist for Matt Murphy's band and the Blues Brothers.

== Career ==
Thurston's musical career began in the early 1980s with St Louis's Soulard Blues Band. His next band was the Blues City Band, followed by The Sounds of The City, which also featured Johnnie Johnson, a collaborator of Chuck Berry, and the bassist Gus Thornton. Eventually Thurston began working outside St Louis, performing with James Cotton and Matt Murphy.

After John Belushi died from a heroin and cocaine overdose in 1982, Blues Brothers guitarist Matt "Guitar" Murphy started his own band, with Larry Thurston as lead singer. When the Blues Brothers reunited in 1988, Thurston was chosen to take Belushi's place as lead singer, alongside soul/R&B artists such as Sam Moore and Eddie Floyd. The band started going on world tours, creating the albums The Blues Brothers Band Live in Montreux and Red, White & Blues in the process. In 1994, Thurston left the Blues Brothers and was replaced by Tommy "Pipes" McDonnell. He finished college, began working a regular job, and became an associate minister at his church, later founding the New Covenant Christian Church, where he became a pastor.

Songwriter Jeff Alexander saw Thurston performing with Johnnie Johnson at Off Broadway in St Louis. In 2001 Alexander began recording School For Fools and asked Thurston to participate. Levon Helm joined on drums, and Johnnie Johnson played piano on two songs. School For Fools became Thurston's first and only solo album. In 2004 Alexander was producing Johnnie Be Eighty. And Still Bad!, a Johnnie Johnson project. Johnson was unable to sing his best, and Alexander asked Thurston to provide vocals on five of the tracks.
