= Groove Master =

Studio album by Hank Crawford
- Released: 1990
- Recorded: January and March, 1990
- Studio: Giant Studios, NYC
- Genre: Jazz
- Length: 44:00
- Label: Milestone; M-9182/MCD-9182-2
- Producer: Bob Porter

Hank Crawford chronology
On the Blue Side (1990)	Groove Master (1990)	Bossa International (1990)

Groove Master is an album by saxophonist Hank Crawford recorded in 1990 and released on the Milestone label.

== Reception ==
Professional ratings
Review scores
Source	Rating
Allmusic	2.5/5 stars
The Penguin Guide to Jazz Recordings	3/4 stars

Allmusic's Scott Yanow stated: "Hank Crawford always puts a lot of passion into each note he plays. On this set of blues and soulful ballads, Crawford caresses each melody as usual but the lack of tempo variations and the generally so-so material keep this from being one of his more essential recordings. ... Although a pleasant enough listen, Hank Crawford has recorded many more significant dates than Groove Master".

== Track listing ==
1. "Grown and Gone" (Hank Crawford) – 5:11
2. "There Is a Way" (Gloria Coleman) – 4:11
3. "Blues for the Red Boy" (Todd Rhodes) – 7:06
4. "Saving All My Love for You" (Michael Masser, Gerry Goffin) – 4:22
5. "Bluebird" (Charlie Parker) – 6:01
6. "A Toast to Lovers" (Danny Overbea) – 6:05
7. "Holy Moly" (Melvin Sparks) – 5:42
8. "Canadian Sunset" (Eddie Heywood, Norman Gimbel) – 5:32

== Personnel ==
- Hank Crawford – alto saxophone, electric piano, arranger, conductor
- Alan Rubin, Lew Soloff – trumpet
- Lou Marini – tenor saxophone
- Howard Johnson – baritone saxophone
- Gloria Coleman – organ
- Dr. John – piano
- Melvin Sparks – guitar
- Wilbur Bascomb - bass
- Bernard Purdie − drums, percussion
