= Made in America (The Blues Brothers album) =

Live album by The Blues Brothers
- Released: December 5, 1980
- Recorded: July 26 – August 1, 1980 at Universal Amphitheatre, Los Angeles
- Genre: Blues, rhythm and blues, soul
- Length: 33:45
- Label: Atlantic
- Producer: Bob Tischler

The Blues Brothers chronology
The Blues Brothers: Music from the Soundtrack (1980)	Made in America (1980)	Best of the Blues Brothers (1981)

Made in America is the third album by The Blues Brothers. The second live album by the band, it was released in December 1980 as a followup to their hit film released that year, The Blues Brothers. To support the film, the band embarked on a 22 dates tour in North America, culminating with seven dates at the Universal Amphitheater in Los Angeles. Keyboardist and musical director Paul Shaffer, sax player Tom Scott and drummer Steve Jordan, who were absent in the film and the soundtrack due to scheduling conflicts, reprised their roles as full-fledged band members. Drummer Willie Hall was let go but the band decided to retain Murphy Dunne, who had replaced Shaffer in the film, as additional keyboards player. Session man Jeff Mironov was brought in to provide additional guitar for the record.

Like the Blues Brothers previous albums, Made in America showcases a selection of blues and rhythm and blues standards. "Joliet" Jake Blues (John Belushi) was particularly keen on singing Randy Newman’s "Guilty", a song which had a deep biographical meaning to him. In the album "Guilty" leads into a rendition of the theme from the TV series Perry Mason and Jerry Leiber and Mike Stoller's "Riot in Cell Block No. 9", establishing a narrative of guilt, trial and sentence. "Green Onions" marked the first occasion two of the band members (Steve Cropper and Duck Dunn) performed their own material, the song being a standard by Booker T. & the M.G.'s.

Released in December 1980, Made in America was the Blues Brothers' third consecutive album to enter the Billboard top 50, peaking at No. 49. "Who's Making Love", released as a single, cracked the Top 40 at No. 39. A second single, "Going Back to Miami", would peak at No. 108.

Made in America was the band's last album in its original incarnation. Following Belushi's death in 1982, the group disbanded for a few years until reforming in 1988 with Leon Pendarvis replacing Shaffer and Danny Gottlieb replacing Jordan. (Scott had left the band at the end of the tour following a salary dispute.)

Professional ratings
Review scores
Source	Rating
AllMusic	2/5 stars

== Track listing ==
1. "Soul Finger"/"Funky Broadway" (James Alexander, Ronnie Caldwell, Ben Cauley, Carl Cunningham, Phalon Jones, Jimmy King; Arlester "Dyke" Christian) – 2:05
2. "Who's Making Love" (Homer Banks, Bettye Crutcher, Don Davis, Raymond Jackson) – 3:33
3. "Do You Love Me"/"Mother Popcorn (You Got to Have a Mother for Me)" (James Brown, Alfred Ellis, Berry Gordy, Jr.) – 2:55
4. "Guilty" (Randy Newman) – 3:41
5. "Perry Mason Theme" (Fred Steiner) – 2:04
6. "Riot in Cell Block No. 9" (Jerry Leiber, Mike Stoller) – 3:32
7. "Green Onions" (Steve Cropper, Al Jackson Jr., Booker T. Jones, Lewis Steinberg) – 5:45
8. "I Ain't Got You" (Calvin Carter) – 2:44
9. "From the Bottom" (Sonny Boy Williamson II) – 3:25
10. "Going Back to Miami" (Wayne Cochran) – 4:01

Produced by Bob Tischler & Paul Shaffer

== Personnel ==
- Elwood Blues – vocals, harmonica
- "Joliet" Jake Blues – vocals
- Steve "The Colonel" Cropper – guitar
- Donald "Duck" Dunn – bass guitar
- Murphy "Murph" Dunne – keyboards, electric piano, Wurlitzer
- Steve "Getdwa" Jordan – drums, backing vocals
- Tom "Bones" Malone – tenor and baritone saxophone, trombone, trumpet, horn arrangements
- Lou "Blue Lou" Marini – tenor and alto saxophone
- Matt "Guitar" Murphy – lead guitar
- Alan Rubin – trumpet, backing vocals (Rubin's previous nickname "Mr. Fabulous" has been dropped)
- Tom "Jazzman" Scott – tenor and alto saxophone, horn arrangements (Scott's nickname has been changed from "Triple Scale")
- Paul "The Shiv" Shaffer – keyboards, piano, Hammond organ, Wurlitzer, backing vocals, musical director, co-producer
- Jeff Mironov – additional guitar

== Tour personnel ==
- Morris Lyda – Production manager
- Bill Robbins – Assistant manager
- Leroy Kerr – Stage Manager
- Edd Kolakowski – Steinway piano and keyboards technician
- Rich Mayne – Drum tech and equipment manager
- Richard "Smokey" Wendell – Security
- Bill "Superfoot" Wallace – Physical stress therapist
- John Blasutta – House sound engineer
- Tom Littrell – Lighting designer
- Johnny Roberts – Monitor engineer

== Certifications ==
Region	Certification	Certified units/sales
United Kingdom (BPI)	Silver	60,000^{^}
^{^} Shipments figures based on certification alone.
