= The Blues Brothers (film) =

1980 film by John Landis

- Theatrical release poster
- Directed by: John Landis
- Written by: Dan Aykroyd; John Landis
- Produced by: Robert K. Weiss
- Starring: John Belushi; Dan Aykroyd; James Brown; Cab Calloway; Ray Charles; Carrie Fisher; Aretha Franklin; Henry Gibson
- Cinematography: Stephen M. Katz
- Edited by: George Folsey Jr.
- Distributed by: Universal Pictures
- Release date: June 20, 1980
- Running time: 133 minutes
- Country: United States
- Language: English
- Budget: $27.5 million
- Box office: $115.2 million

The Blues Brothers is a 1980 American musical action comedy film directed by John Landis. It stars John Belushi as "Joliet" Jake Blues and Dan Aykroyd as his brother Elwood, characters developed from the recurring musical sketch "The Blues Brothers" on NBC's variety series Saturday Night Live. The script is set in and around Chicago and Wauconda, Illinois, where it was filmed, and the screenplay is by Aykroyd and Landis. It features musical numbers by singers James Brown, Cab Calloway, Aretha Franklin, Ray Charles and John Lee Hooker. It features non-musical supporting performances by Carrie Fisher and Henry Gibson.

The story is a tale of redemption for paroled convict Jake and his brother Elwood, who set out on "a mission from God" to prevent the foreclosure of the Roman Catholic orphanage in which they were raised. To do so, they must reunite their rhythm and blues (R&B) band and organize a performance to earn the $5,000 needed to pay the orphanage's property tax bill. Along the way, they are targeted by a homicidal "mystery woman", neo-Nazis and a country and western band—all while being relentlessly pursued by the police.

Universal Pictures, which won the bidding war for the film, was hoping to take advantage of Belushi's popularity in the wake of Saturday Night Live, the film Animal House, and the Blues Brothers' musical success; it soon found itself unable to control production costs. The start of filming was delayed when Aykroyd, who was new to film screenwriting, took six months to deliver a long and unconventional script that Landis had to rewrite before production, which began without a final budget. On location in Chicago, Belushi's partying and drug use caused lengthy and costly delays that, along with the destructive car chases depicted onscreen, made the film one of the most expensive comedies ever produced.

Owing to concerns that the film would fail, its initial bookings were less than half of those similar films normally received. Released in the United States on June 20, 1980, it received mostly positive reviews from critics and grossed over $115 million in theaters worldwide before its release on home video, and has become a cult classic over the years. A sequel, Blues Brothers 2000, was released in 1998 and failed to match the critical and commercial success of the original film. In 2020, The Blues Brothers was selected for preservation in the United States National Film Registry by the Library of Congress as "culturally, historically, or aesthetically significant".

== Plot ==
Jake Blues, a blues vocalist and petty criminal, is paroled from Joliet Prison after serving three years of a five-year sentence for armed robbery and is picked up by his brother Elwood in a battered former police car. Jake complains that Elwood is driving a police car, and Elwood demonstrates its capabilities by jumping an open drawbridge. They visit the Catholic orphanage where they were raised, and learn from Sister Mary Stigmata that it will be closed unless it pays $5,000 in property taxes. At the suggestion of their friend Curtis, they attend a sermon by the Reverend Cleophus James at the Triple Rock Baptist Church, where Jake has an epiphany: they can reform their band, the Blues Brothers, which disbanded while Jake was in prison, and raise the money to save the orphanage.

That night, state troopers attempt to arrest Elwood for driving with a suspended license due to dozens of parking tickets and moving violations. The brothers escape after a car chase through the Dixie Square Mall. As they arrive at the flophouse where Elwood lives, a mysterious woman fires a rocket launcher at them but misses. The next morning, as the police arrive at the flophouse, the same woman detonates a bomb that demolishes the building but leaves Jake and Elwood unharmed, saving them from arrest.

Jake and Elwood begin tracking down members of the band. Five of them are performing as Murph and the Magic Tones at a deserted Holiday Inn lounge and quickly rejoin. Their trumpeter Mr. Fabulous turns them down as he is the maître d' at an expensive restaurant but relents when the brothers dine with poor manners and threaten to become regular patrons. On their way to meet the final two members, the brothers find the road through Jackson Park blocked by a neo-Nazi demonstration on a bridge; Elwood runs them off the bridge into the East Lagoon. The neo-Nazis swear revenge. The brothers find Matt "Guitar" Murphy, who now runs a soul food restaurant on Maxwell Street with his wife and "Blue Lou" Marini. Murphy's wife advises him against rejoining the band, to no avail. The group obtains instruments and equipment from Ray's Music Exchange, and Ray, "as usual", takes an IOU.

As Jake attempts to book a gig, the mystery woman blows up his phone booth; once again, he is miraculously unhurt. The band stumbles onto a gig at Bob's Country Bunker, a honky-tonk in Kokomo, Indiana, by impersonating the country and western band booked. They win over the rowdy crowd, but run up a bar tab higher than their pay, and infuriate the Good Ole Boys, the band they impersonated.

Realizing they need a big show to raise the necessary money, the brothers manage to book the Palace Hotel Ballroom in Wauconda. They drive around Wauconda promoting the concert, alerting the police, the neo-Nazis and the Good Ole Boys of their whereabouts. The ballroom is packed with fans, police officers and the Good Ole Boys. Jake and Elwood perform two songs, then sneak offstage, as the tax deadline rapidly approaches. A record company executive offers them a $10,000 cash advance on a recording contract - more than enough to pay off the orphanage's taxes and the IOU - and tells them how to slip out of the building unnoticed. As they escape through a service tunnel, they are confronted by the mystery woman: Jake's vengeful ex-fiancée. After her volley of M16 rifle bullets leaves them once again miraculously unharmed, Jake offers a series of ridiculous excuses that she rejects. When she looks into his eyes, though, she takes interest in him again and becomes distracted long enough for the brothers to escape in their car.

Jake and Elwood race back toward Chicago, with dozens of state and local police and the Good Ole Boys and the Neo-Nazis in pursuit. They elude them all with a series of improbable maneuvers, including a miraculous gravity-defying escape from the neo-Nazis. Finally arriving at the Chicago City Hall building, they rush inside, followed by hundreds of law enforcement officers, firefighters and the National Guard. The brothers find the Cook County Assessor's office and successfully pay the tax bill but are arrested by the mob of law officers immediately after. In prison, the band plays "Jailhouse Rock" for the inmates.

== Cast ==
- John Belushi as "Joliet" Jake Blues, a former blues singer, paroled from prison after three years
- Dan Aykroyd as Elwood J. Blues, Jake's blood brother, also a former blues singer
- James Brown as the Reverend Cleophus James, pastor of the Triple Rock Baptist Church. His musical sermon "The Old Landmark" causes Jake to have an epiphany
- Cab Calloway as Curtis, orphanage janitor and an old friend/father figure of the brothers, who suggests they visit the church, and helps them advertise the show and performs "Minnie the Moocher" for the audience
- Ray Charles as Ray, a blind music store owner, who performs "Shake a Tail Feather" to demonstrate the effectiveness of the instruments he sells
- Aretha Franklin as Mrs. Murphy, Matt Murphy's wife, who owns a soul food restaurant with him. She performs "Think" to persuade him not to join the band
- Steve "The Colonel" Cropper – lead guitar; a member of Murph and the Magic Tones
- Donald "Duck" Dunn – bass guitar; a member of Murph and the Magic Tones
- Murphy Dunne ("Murph") – keyboards; lead singer of Murph and the Magic Tones
- Willie "Too Big" Hall – drums; a member of Murph and the Magic Tones
- Tom "Bones" Malone – trombone, saxophone; a member of Murph and the Magic Tones
- "Blue Lou" Marini – saxophone; the dishwasher at the soul food restaurant
- Matt "Guitar" Murphy – lead guitar; the cook at the soul food restaurant
- "Mr. Fabulous" Alan Rubin – trumpet; the maitre d' at the Chez Paul restaurant
- Carrie Fisher as the Mystery Woman, Jake's former fiancée, who tries to kill him for leaving her at the altar
- John Candy as Burton Mercer, Jake's parole officer assisting the police in their hunt for the Blues Brothers
- Henry Gibson as the Head Nazi, the leader of a local American National Socialist White People's Party
- Twiggy as girl waiting at the gas station
- John Lee Hooker as Street Slim, a man singing "Boom Boom" together with a small band on Maxwell Street
- Kathleen Freeman as Sister Mary Stigmata, AKA "The Penguin", the nun who leads the orphanage where the brothers grew up
- Steve Lawrence as Maury Sline, the agent who organized and booked many of the Blues Brothers' performances before Jake was sent to jail
- Frank Oz as the corrections officer who returns Jake's possessions to him at the beginning of the film
- Jeff Morris as Bob, the owner of Bob's Country Bunker
- Charles Napier as Tucker McElroy, lead singer and Winnebago driver of the Good Ole Boys
- Steven Williams as Trooper Mount, one of the cops who follows Jake and Elwood from the start
- Armand Cerami as Trooper Daniel, one of the cops who follows Jake and Elwood from the start
- John Landis as Trooper La Fong, a cop who chases the Bluesmobile at the mall

== Production ==
=== Origins ===
John Belushi and Dan Aykroyd created the characters Jake and Elwood Blues in performances on Saturday Night Live. The name The Blues Brothers was Howard Shore's idea. Aykroyd developed the Blues Brothers' backstory and character sketches in collaboration with Ron Gwynne, who is credited as a story consultant for the film. As related in the liner notes of the band's debut album, Briefcase Full of Blues, the brothers grew up in an orphanage, learned the blues from a janitor named Curtis, and sealed their brotherhood by cutting their middle fingers with a steel string said to have come from Elmore James's guitar.

Belushi had become a star in 1978 as a result of both the Blues Brothers' musical success and his role in National Lampoon's Animal House. At one point, he managed the triple feat of being the star of the week's top-grossing film and top-rated television series and singing on the Billboard 200 #1 album within a year. When Aykroyd and Belushi decided they could make a Blues Brothers film, the bidding war was intense. Universal Studios narrowly beat Paramount Pictures for the project. John Landis, who had directed Belushi in Animal House, was aboard as director.

The project had neither a budget nor a script. Universal head Lew Wasserman thought the film could be made for $12 million; the filmmakers wanted $20 million. It was impossible to settle on an amount without a screenplay to review, and after Mitch Glazer declined to help him, Aykroyd wrote one on his own. Aykroyd had never written a screenplay before, as he admitted in the 1998 documentary Stories Behind the Making of The Blues Brothers, or even read one, and he was unable to find a writing partner. He put together a very detailed volume that explained the characters' origins and how the band members were recruited. His final draft was 324 pages, three times longer than a standard screenplay, written not in a standard screenplay format, but more like free verse. To soften the impact, Aykroyd made a joke of the thick script and had it bound with the cover of the Los Angeles Yellow Pages directory when he turned it in to producer Robert K. Weiss. He titled it The Return of the Blues Brothers, and credited it to "Scriptatron GL-9000". Landis was tasked with editing the script into a usable screenplay, which took him about two weeks.

=== Casting ===
At Aykroyd's demand, soul and R&B stars James Brown, Cab Calloway, Ray Charles and Aretha Franklin were cast in speaking parts to support musical numbers built around them. This later caused friction in the production between Landis and Universal, as its costs far exceeded the original budget. Since none of them except Charles had had any hits in recent years, the studio wanted Landis to replace them with—or add performances by—younger acts, such as Rose Royce, whose "Car Wash" had made them disco stars after its use in the 1976 film of that name. The character portrayed by Cab Calloway is named Curtis as an homage to Curtis Salgado, an Oregon blues musician who inspired Belushi while he was in that area filming Animal House.

Other musicians in the cast include Big Walter Horton, Pinetop Perkins and John Lee Hooker (who performs "Boom Boom" during the Maxwell Street scene). The members of the Blues Brothers Band were themselves notable. Steve Cropper and Donald Dunn are architects of the Stax Records sound (Cropper plays guitar at the start of the Sam & Dave song "Soul Man") and were half of Booker T. & the M.G.'s. Horn players Lou Marini, Tom Malone and Alan Rubin had all played in Blood, Sweat & Tears and the house band on Saturday Night Live. Drummer Willie Hall had played in the Bar-Kays and backed Isaac Hayes. Matt "Guitar" Murphy was a veteran blues guitarist who played with Memphis Slim and Howlin' Wolf. As the band developed at Saturday Night Live, pianist Paul Shaffer was part of the act and cast in the film, but owing to contractual obligations with SNL, he was unable to participate, so actor-musician Murphy Dunne (whose father, George Dunne, was the President of the Cook County Board of Commissioners) was hired to take his role.

Over 500 extras were used for the next-to-last scene, the blockade of the building at Richard J. Daley Center, including 200 National Guardsmen, 100 state and city police officers, with 15 horses for the mounted police (and three each Sherman tanks, helicopters, and fire engines).

==== Cameos and minor appearances ====
The film has a number of cameo appearances by established celebrities and entertainment industry figures, including Steve Lawrence as booking agent Maury Sline, Twiggy as a "chic lady" in a Jaguar convertible whom Elwood propositions at a gas station, Steven Spielberg as the Cook County Assessor's clerk, Landis as a state trooper in the mall chase, Joe Walsh as the first prisoner to jump up on a table in the final scene and Chaka Khan as the soloist in the Triple Rock choir. Muppet performer Frank Oz plays a corrections officer, and in the scene where the brothers crash into Toys "R" Us, the customer who asks for a Miss Piggy doll is played by stunt coordinator Gary McLarty. Singer/songwriter Stephen Bishop is an Illinois state trooper who complains that Jake and Elwood broke his watch (a result of the car chase in the mall). Makeup artist Layne "Shotgun" Britton is the old card player who asks Elwood, "Did you get me my Cheez Whiz, boy?" Prior to becoming well known for the character Pee-wee Herman, Paul Reubens had a role as a Chez Paul waiter with one spoken line ("We have a Dom Pérignon '71 at $120.")

=== Filming ===
Principal photography began in July 1979, with the film's budget still not settled. For the first month, things ran smoothly on and off the set. When Weiss saw the supposedly final $17.5 million budget, he reportedly joked, "I think we've spent that much already."

In the next month, the production began falling behind schedule. Much of the delay was due to Belushi's partying and carousing. When not on set, he went out to his familiar Chicago haunts such as Wrigley Field and the Old Town Ale House. People often recognized him and slipped him cocaine, a drug he was already using heavily on his own, hoping to use it with him. "Every blue-collar Joe wants his John Belushi story," said Smokey Wendell, who was eventually hired to keep it away from the star. As a result of his late nights and drug and alcohol use, Belushi often missed unit calls (the beginning of a production day) or went to his trailer after them to sleep, wasting hours of production time. One night, Aykroyd found him crashing on the sofa of a nearby house, where Belushi had already helped himself to food in the refrigerator.

Cocaine was already so prevalent on the set (like many other film productions of that era) that Aykroyd, who used far less than Belushi, claims a section of the budget was actually set aside for purchases of the drug during night shooting. The stars had a private bar, the Blues Club, built on the set, for themselves, crew, and friends. Carrie Fisher, Aykroyd's girlfriend at the time, said that most of the bar's staff doubled as dealers, procuring any drug patrons desired.

The movie's original budget was quickly surpassed, and Wasserman grew increasingly frustrated. He was regularly confronting Ned Tanen, the executive in charge of production for Universal, over the costs. Sean Daniel, another studio executive, was not reassured when he came to Chicago and saw the production had set up a special facility for the 70 cars used in the chase sequences. Filming there, which was supposed to have concluded in the middle of September, continued into late October.

On the set, Belushi's drug use worsened. Fisher, who herself later struggled with cocaine addiction, said Landis told her to keep Belushi away from the drug. Wendell was hired to clear any drugs from the places Belushi visited off-camera. Nevertheless, at one point, Landis found Belushi with what he described as a "mountain" of cocaine on a table in his trailer, which led to a tearful confrontation in which Belushi admitted his addiction and feared it could eventually kill him.

After Aykroyd and Belushi's wife Judy talked to Belushi, the production returned to Los Angeles. Filming there again ran smoothly until it came time to shoot the final sequence at the Hollywood Palladium. Just beforehand, Belushi fell off a borrowed skateboard and seriously injured his knee, making it unlikely he could shoot the scene, which required him to sing, dance and do cartwheels. Wasserman persuaded the city's top orthopedic surgeon to postpone his weekend plans long enough to anesthetize Belushi's knee, and the scene was filmed as intended.

==== Locations ====
Much of The Blues Brothers was shot on location in and around Chicago between July and October 1979, including Joliet Correctional Center in nearby Joliet, Illinois, and Wauconda, Illinois, where the car crashes into the side of Route 12. Made with the cooperation of Mayor Jane M. Byrne, it is credited for putting Chicago on the map as a venue for filmmaking. In an article written to mark the film's 25th anniversary DVD release, Aykroyd told the Chicago Sun-Times: "Chicago is one of the stars of the movie. We wrote it as a tribute."

The Bluesmobile races through the mall while being chased by state troopers in a scene of the film.

The first traffic stop was in Park Ridge, Illinois. The shopping mall car chase was filmed in the real, albeit shuttered, Dixie Square Mall, in Harvey, Illinois. The bridge jump was filmed on an actual drawbridge, the 95th Street bridge over the Calumet River, on Chicago's southeast side. The main entrance to Wrigley Field (and its sign reading "Save lives Drive safely Prevent fires") makes a brief appearance when the Illinois Nazis visit it after Elwood registers the ballpark's address, 1060 West Addison, as his home address on his driver's license. (Elwood's Illinois driver's license number is an almost-valid encoded number, with Aykroyd's own birth date embedded.) Jake's final confrontation with his girlfriend was filmed in a replica of a section of the abandoned Chicago freight tunnel system. The other chase scenes included lower Wacker Drive, Lake Street and Richard J. Daley Center.

In the final car chase scene, the production actually dropped a Ford Pinto, representing the one driven by the Illinois Nazis, from a helicopter at an altitude of about 1,200 feet—and had to gain a Special Airworthiness Certificate from the Federal Aviation Administration to do it. The FAA was concerned that the car could prove too aerodynamic in a high-altitude drop and pose a threat to nearby buildings. The shot leading up to the car drop, where the Illinois Nazis drive off a freeway ramp, was shot in Milwaukee, Wisconsin, near the Hoan Bridge on Interstate 794. The Lake Freeway (North) was a planned but not completed six-lane freeway and I-794 contained an unfinished ramp off which the Nazis drove. Several Milwaukee skyscrapers are visible in the background as the Bluesmobile flips over, notably the U.S. Bank Center.

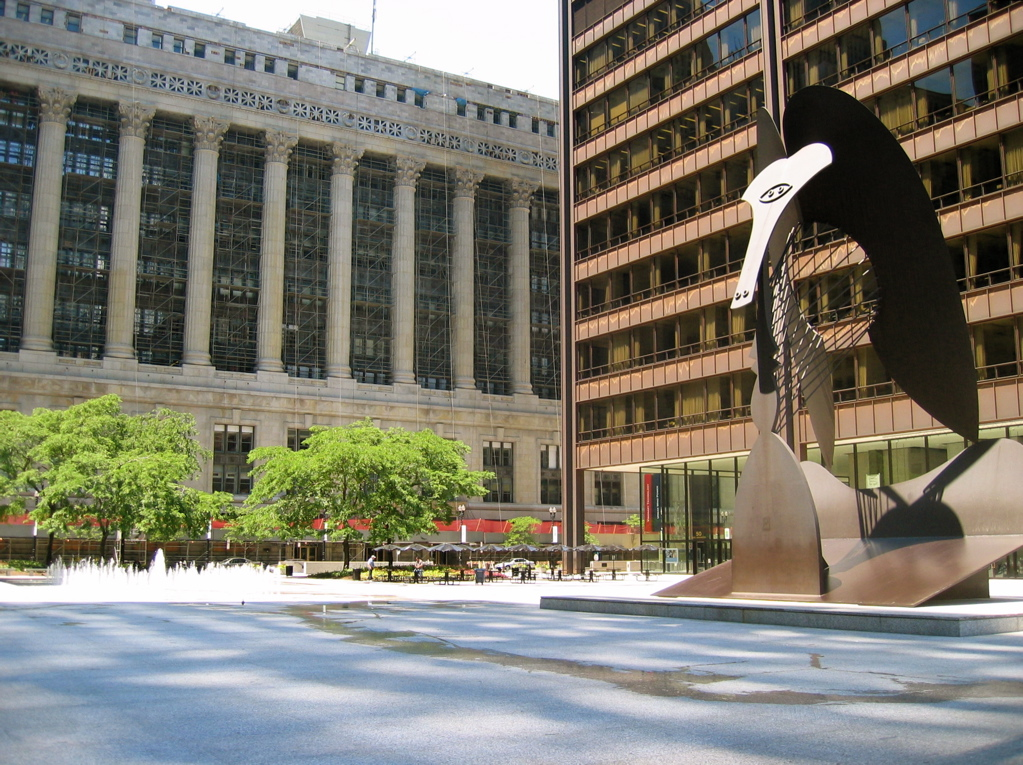
Richard J. Daley Center is Chicago's premier civic center and features a massive sculpture by Pablo Picasso.

The Palace Hotel Ballroom, where the band performs their climactic concert, was at the time of filming a country club, but later became the South Shore Cultural Center, named after the Chicago neighborhood where it is located. The interior concert scenes were filmed in the Hollywood Palladium.

The filming in downtown Chicago was conducted on Sundays during the summer of 1979, and much of downtown was cordoned off from the public. Costs for filming the largest scene in the city's history totaled $3.5 million. Permission was given after Belushi and Aykroyd offered to donate $50,000 to a charity after filming. Although the Bluesmobile was allowed to be driven through the Daley Center lobby, special breakaway panes were temporarily substituted for the normal glass in the building. The speeding car caused $7,650 in damage to 35 granite paver stones and a bronze air grille in the building. Interior shots of the elevator, staircase, and assessor's office were all recreated in a film set for filming.

=== Bluesmobile ===
The film used 13 different cars bought at auction from the California Highway Patrol to depict the retired 1974 Mount Prospect, Illinois, Dodge Monaco patrol car. The vehicles were outfitted by the studio to do particular driving chores: some were customized for speed and others for jumps, depending on the scene. For the large car chases, filmmakers purchased 60 police cars at $400 each, and most were destroyed at the completion of the filming. More than 40 stunt drivers were hired, and the crew kept a 24-hour body shop to repair cars.

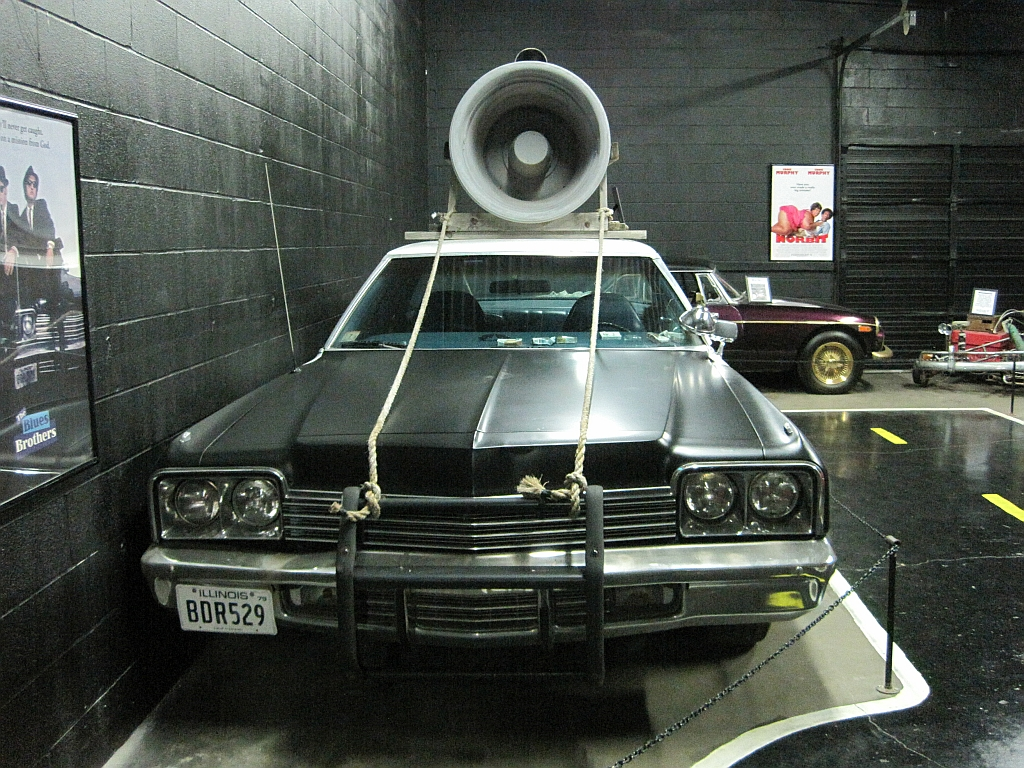
Reproduction of the "Bluesmobile" at Rusty's TV & Movie Car Museum, Jackson, Tennessee

For the scene when the brothers finally arrive at the Richard J. Daley Center, a mechanic took several months to rig the car to fall apart. At the time of its release, The Blues Brothers held the world record for the most cars destroyed in one film.

=== Post-production ===
Landis' difficulties continued even after principal photography ended. The first cut of The Blues Brothers lasted two and a half hours, with an intermission. After one early screening, Wasserman demanded it be shortened and 20 minutes were cut. The film's final budget was $27.5 million (equivalent to $107 million in 2025), $10 million over its original budget.

Prospects for a successful release did not look good. Aykroyd and Belushi had left SNL at the end of the fourth season, reducing their bankability. Belushi's fame had taken a further hit after the critical failure of Spielberg's film 1941 at the end of the year. One day after the editing was done, Wasserman invited Landis up to his office to speak with Ted Mann, head of the Mann Theatres chain, which dominated film exhibition in the Western United States. He told Landis that he would not book the film at any theaters in predominantly white neighborhoods, such as Westwood. Not only did Mann not want black patrons going there to see the film, but he also surmised that white viewers were unlikely to see a film featuring older black musical stars. Ultimately, the film got less than half the bookings nationwide for its initial release than a typical big-budget studio film of the era, which did not bode well for its box-office success.

== Reception ==
=== Box office ===
The Blues Brothers opened on June 20, 1980, in 594 theaters. It took in $4,858,152, ranking second for that week (after The Empire Strikes Back). The film in total grossed $57,229,890 domestically and $58,000,000 in foreign box office for a total of $115,229,890. It ranked 10th at the domestic box office for the year. By genre, it is the ninth-highest-grossing musical and the 10th-highest earner among comedy road movies. It ranks second, between Wayne's World and Wayne's World 2, among films adapted from Saturday Night Live sketches. Landis claimed The Blues Brothers was also the first American film to gross more money overseas than it did in the U.S. Over the years, the film has retained a cult following and earned additional revenue through television, home video, and cinema reruns.

=== Critical reception ===
The Blues Brothers received mostly positive reviews from critics. On Rotten Tomatoes, it has a 72% rating, based on 92 reviews, with an average rating of 7.50/10. The site's critical consensus reads: "Too over the top for its own good, but ultimately rescued by the cast's charm, director John Landis' grace, and several soul-stirring musical numbers." It won the Golden Reel Award for Outstanding Achievement in Sound Editing – Sound Effects and Foley for Feature Film, is 14th on Total Film magazine's "List of the 50 Greatest Comedy Films of All Time," 20th on Empire's list of "The 50 Greatest Comedies", and 69th on Bravo's "100 Funniest Movies" list. Metacritic gave the film a score of 60 based on 12 reviews. Roger Ebert of the Chicago Sun-Times gave The Blues Brothers three out of four, praising its energetic musical numbers and "incredible" car chases. Ebert wrote, "Belushi and Aykroyd come over as hard-boiled city guys, total cynics with a world-view of sublime simplicity, and that all fits perfectly with the movie's other parts. There's even room, in the midst of the carnage and mayhem, for a surprising amount of grace, humor, and whimsy." Gene Siskel of the Chicago Tribune gave the film a "rare four-star rating", calling it "one of the all-time great comedies" and "the best movie ever made in Chicago". He called the film "technically superb", praised it for "countering every explosion with a quiet moment", and said it "is at once a pure exercise in physical comedy as well as a marvelous tribute to the urban blues sound". He ranked it eighth on his list of the ten best films of 1980. Richard Corliss wrote in Time, "The Blues Brothers is a demolition symphony that works with the cold efficiency of a Moog synthesizer gone sadistic."

In his review for The Washington Post, Gary Arnold said Landis "has engorged the frail plot of The Blues Brothers with car chases and crack-ups, filmed with such avid, humorless starkness on the streets of Chicago that comic sensations are virtually obliterated". Janet Maslin of The New York Times criticized The Blues Brothers for shortchanging viewers on details about Jake and Elwood's affinity for African-American culture. She also took Landis to task for "distracting editing", mentioning the Soul Food diner scene in which saxophonist Marini's head is out of shot most of the time as he dances on the counter. In the documentary, Stories Behind the Making of The Blues Brothers, Landis acknowledges the criticism, and says, "Everybody has his opinion", and Marini recalls the dismay he felt at watching the scene.

Kim Newman, writing for Empire in 2013, called The Blues Brothers "an amalgam of urban sleaze, automobile crunch and blackheart rhythm and blues" with "better music than any film had had for many years". He noted that Belushi and Aykroyd pack in their heroes: "Aretha storming through 'Think', Cab Calloway cruising through 'Minnie the Moocher', John Lee Hooker boogying through 'Boom Boom' and Ray Charles on electric piano", and observed that "the picture had revived the careers of virtually all the musicians that appeared in it", concluding, "it still sounds great and looks as good as ever through Ray Bans".

On the 30th anniversary of the film's release, L'Osservatore Romano (the daily newspaper of Vatican City State) wrote that the film is filled with positive symbolism and moral references that can be related to Catholicism, adding that The Blues Brothers "is a memorable film, and, judging by the facts, a Catholic one". Robert Prevost, future Pope Leo XIV and Chicago native, was a fan of the movie when it released in the 1980s. Photos of Leo when he was in seminary dressed in the Blues Brothers' signature fedora and sunglasses with a clerical collar were included in a documentary released by the Vatican.

=== Cult-film status ===
The Blues Brothers has become a staple of late-night cinema, even slowly morphing into an audience-participation show in its regular screenings at the Valhalla Cinema, in Melbourne, Australia. Landis acknowledged the support of the cinema and the fans by a phone call he made to the cinema at the 10th-anniversary screening, and later invited regular attendees to make cameo appearances in Blues Brothers 2000. The fans act as the members of the crowd during the performance of "Ghost Riders in the Sky".

In August 2005, a 25th-anniversary celebration for The Blues Brothers was held at Grauman's Chinese Theatre in Los Angeles. Attendees included Landis, former Universal Studios executive Thom Mount, film editor George Folsey Jr., and cast members James Brown, Henry Gibson, Charles Napier, Steve Cropper and Stephen Bishop. It featured a press conference, a panel discussion Aykroyd joined by satellite, and a screening of the film's original theatrical version. The panel discussion was broadcast directly to many other cinemas around the country.

The cult-like popularity of The Blues Brothers has also spread to non-English-language markets such as Japan; it was an inspiration for Japanese companies Studio Hibari and Aniplex, which led to the creation of the manga and anime franchise Nerima Daikon Brothers, which contain heavy references to the film. In 2026, the Blues Brothers joined Cookie Monster and other titularly colored characters for Universal Studios Japan's musical Ultimate Blues Bash, a concert featuring characters owned by Universal Studios which includes songs from the Blues Brothers movie.

=== American Film Institute ===
- AFI's 100 Years...100 Laughs – nominated
- AFI's 100 Years...100 Songs:
  - "Think" – nominated
- AFI's 100 Years...100 Movie Quotes:
  - "We're on a mission from God." – nominated

== Home media ==
The film was first released on LaserDisc in 1980. In 1983, it was released on CED, VHS and Betamax by MCA Home Video. It was then re-released on VHS, Laserdisc and Betamax in 1985 from MCA Home Video and again in 1990 from MCA/Universal Home Video. It was also released in a two-pack VHS box set with Animal House.

When The Blues Brothers was first screened for a preview audience, a producer demanded that Landis cut 25 minutes. After trimming 15 minutes, it was released in theaters at 132 minutes. The original 148-minute length was restored for the collector's edition DVD and a special edition VHS and LaserDisc release in 1998. The DVD and Laserdisc versions included a 56-minute documentary, The Stories Behind the Making of The Blues Brothers. Produced and directed by JM Kenny (who also produced the collector's edition DVD of Animal House that year), it included interviews with Landis, Aykroyd, members of the Blues Brothers Band, producer Robert K. Weiss, editor George Folsey Jr. and others involved with the film. The DVD version also includes production photographs, the theatrical trailer, production notes, and cast and filmmaker bios. The 25th anniversary DVD release in 2005 included both the theatrical cut and the extended version.

The Blues Brothers was released on Blu-ray on July 26, 2011, with the same basic contents as the 25th anniversary DVD. In a March 2011 interview with Ain't it Cool News, Landis said he had approved the Blu-ray's remastered transfer. On May 19, 2020, the movie was given a 4K UHD release in both digital and 4K Blu-ray; it has a new 4K remaster from the original theatrical negative, and the extended footage was remastered from the same archived print as well.

== Soundtrack ==
The Blues Brothers: Original Soundtrack Recording

Soundtrack album by the Blues Brothers
- Released: June 20, 1980
- Recorded: 1980
- Studios: Universal (Chicago); Record Plant (Los Angeles)
- Genres: R&B; blues
- Length: 40:27
- Label: Atlantic
- Producer: Bob Tischler

The Blues Brothers chronology
Briefcase Full of Blues (1978)	The Blues Brothers: Original Soundtrack Recording (1980)	Made in America (1980)

Professional ratings
Review scores
Source	Rating
AllMusic	3/5 stars

The Blues Brothers: Original Soundtrack Recording (later rereleased as The Blues Brothers: Music from the Soundtrack) is the Blues Brothers Band's second album. Released on June 20, 1980, it was a followup to their debut live album, Briefcase Full of Blues. The band toured the same year to promote the film, later releasing a second live album, Made in America, which featured the Billboard Hot 100 top 40 track "Who's Making Love".

The soundtrack was recorded in Chicago at Universal Recording Corporation at the same time the movie was being filmed, with the exception of "Gimme Some Lovin'", which was recorded at the Record Plant in Los Angeles, and "The Old Landmark", which was recorded live on a Universal Studios sound stage on the West Coast, with overdubs later recorded at a studio in New York City.

The songs on the soundtrack album are a noticeably different audio mix than in the film, with a prominent baritone saxophone in the horn line (also heard in the film during "Shake a Tail Feather", though no baritone sax is present), and female backing vocals on "Everybody Needs Somebody to Love", though the band had no other backup singers, besides Jake and/or Elwood, in the film. A number of regular band members, including saxophonist Tom Scott and drummer Steve Jordan, perform on the album but are not in the film.

According to Landis in The Stories Behind the Making of 'The Blues Brothers', filmed musical performances by Aretha Franklin and James Brown took more effort, as neither artist was accustomed to lip-synching their performances. Franklin required several takes, and Brown simply rerecorded his performance live on a Universal Studios sound stage during filming of the holy roller church scene, with overdubs later recorded at a studio in New York City. Calloway had wanted to perform a disco variation on his signature tune, "Minnie the Moocher", having done the song in several styles in the past but Landis insisted that the song be done in an original big-band arrangement. Calloway was initially angry with Landis over this decision but was later pleased with the positive reception his performance received from audiences and fans of the film.

"Gimme Some Lovin'" was a top 20 Hot 100 hit for the Blues Brothers, peaking at number 18. The album sold more than a million copies.

No.	Title	Writer(s)	Artist	Length
1.	"She Caught the Katy"	Taj Mahal, Yank Rachell	The Blues Brothers with lead vocals by Jake Blues	4:10
2.	"Peter Gunn Theme"	Henry Mancini	The Blues Brothers Band	3:46
3.	"Gimme Some Lovin'"	Steve Winwood, Muff Winwood, Spencer Davis	The Blues Brothers with lead vocals by Jake Blues	3:06
4.	"Shake a Tail Feather"	Otha Hayes, Andre Williams, Verlie Rice	Ray Charles with the Blues Brothers (Jake and Elwood, backing vocals)	2:48
5.	"Everybody Needs Somebody to Love"	Jerry Wexler, Bert Berns, Solomon Burke	The Blues Brothers (Jake Blues, lead vocals; Elwood Blues, harmonica and vocals)	3:21
6.	"The Old Landmark"	Adeline M. Brunner	James Brown and the Rev. James Cleveland Choir (additional choir vocals by Chaka Khan credited in the film)	2:56
7.	"Think"	Teddy White, Aretha Franklin	Aretha Franklin and the Blues Brothers with backing vocals by Brenda Corbett, Margaret Branch, Carolyn Franklin, Jake and Elwood	3:13
8.	"Theme from Rawhide"	Dimitri Tiomkin, Ned Washington	Elwood, Jake and the Blues Brothers Band	2:37
9.	"Minnie the Moocher"	Cab Calloway, Irving Mills	Cab Calloway with the Blues Brothers Band	3:23
10.	"Sweet Home Chicago"	Robert Johnson	The Blues Brothers with lead vocals by Jake Blues	7:48
11.	"Jailhouse Rock"	Jerry Leiber, Mike Stoller	Jake Blues and the Blues Brothers (Over the closing credits in the film, verses are sung by James Brown, Cab Calloway, Ray Charles, Aretha Franklin and "crew")	3:19

=== Personnel ===
Partial credits from Richard Buskin and Bob Tischler. Additional credits from the album's liner notes. According to Buskin and producer/engineer Tischler, Murphy Dunne, who plays pianist Murph in the film, could play piano but not well enough to play on the soundtrack. It is unclear whether Dunne plays tambourine on the soundtrack version of "Shake a Tail Feather", as he is portrayed doing in the film.

The Blues Brothers

- "Joliet" Jake Blues (John Belushi) – lead vocals, backing vocals on "Shake a Tail Feather" and "Think"
- Elwood Blues (Dan Aykroyd) – backing vocals, harmonica, lead vocals on "Theme from Rawhide"
- Paul Shaffer - backing vocal arrangements ("Everybody Needs Somebody to Love")
- Steve "The Colonel" Cropper – guitar
- Matt "Guitar" Murphy – guitar
- Donald "Duck" Dunn – bass guitar
- Steve Jordan – drums
- Willie "Too Big" Hall – drums
- Lou "Blue Lou" Marini – tenor and alto saxophones, backing vocals
- Alan "Mr. Fabulous" Rubin – trumpet, backing vocals
- Tom "Triple Scale" Scott – tenor and alto saxophones, backing vocals
- Tom "Bones" Malone – tenor and baritone saxophones, trombone, trumpet, backing vocals, horn arrangements

Special guests

- Ray Charles – lead vocals on "Shake a Tail Feather" and "Jailhouse Rock," Fender Rhodes electric piano on "Shake a Tail Feather"
- James Brown – lead vocals on "The Old Landmark" and "Jailhouse Rock"
- Chaka Khan – additional vocals on "The Old Landmark"
- Aretha Franklin – lead vocals on "Think" and "Jailhouse Rock," piano on "Think"
- Cab Calloway – lead vocals on "Minnie the Moocher"
- John Lee Hooker - Guitar and lead vocals on "Boom Boom"

Additional musicians

- "The Crew" (of the film) – lead vocals on "Jailhouse Rock"
- Brenda Corbett, Margaret Branch, Carolyn Franklin – backing vocals on "Think"
- Rev. James Cleveland Choir – backing vocals on "The Old Landmark"
- Patty Austin, Vivian Cherry, Ullanda McCullough – backing vocals on "Everybody Needs Somebody to Love"
- Elliott Randall – guitar
- Keiv Ginsberg – guitar
- Hiram Bullock – guitar
- David Weston – bass
- Larry Willis – piano
- Bill Payne – piano
- John Springer – piano
- John Hason – piano
- Terry Fryer – piano
- Richard T. Bear – piano
- Arthur Dickson – drums
- Lewis Del Gatto – horn

Production and technical staff

- Bob Tischler – producer, engineer
- Jay Krugman – engineer
- Jim Scheffler – engineer
- Tom Miller – assistant engineer
- Steve Marcantonio – assistant engineer
- Eddie Garcia – assistant engineer
- Ira Newborn – conductor, musical supervision
- Peter Sorel – front cover photography
- Bob Defrin – art direction
- Judith Jacklin – design
- Joe Brescio – mastering

Recording studios

- "Original recording": Universal Recording, Chicago
- "Additional recording": Record Plant, Los Angeles; Record Plant, New York City; Soundmixers, New York City
- Record Plant, NYC – mix location
- The Master Cutting Room – mastering location

=== Charts ===
Chart (1980–2015)	Peak position
Australian Albums (Kent Music Report)	10
Austrian Albums (Ö3 Austria)	51
Canada Top Albums/CDs (RPM)	20
Dutch Albums (Album Top 100)	2
German Albums (Offizielle Top 100)	69
Italian Albums (FIMI)	75
New Zealand Albums (RMNZ)	12
Norwegian Albums (VG-lista)	21
Swedish Albums (Sverigetopplistan)	18
UK Albums (Official Charts)	59
US Billboard 200	13

Chart (2025–2026)	Peak position
Greek Albums (IFPI)	97
US Top Blues Albums (Billboard)	14

=== Certifications ===
Region	Certification	Certified units/sales
Australia (ARIA)	6× Platinum	420,000^{^}
France (SNEP)	2× Platinum	600,000^{*}
Germany (BVMI)	2× Platinum	1,000,000^{^}
Italy (FIMI)	Gold	25,000^{*}
Netherlands (NVPI)	Gold	50,000^{^}
New Zealand (RMNZ)	Platinum	15,000^{^}
Switzerland (IFPI Switzerland)	2× Platinum	100,000^{^}
United Kingdom (BPI)	2× Platinum	600,000^{^}
United States (RIAA)	Platinum	1,000,000^{^}
^{*} Sales figures based on certification alone.^{^} Shipments figures based on certification alone.

== Other songs in the film ==
The film's score includes "God Music" (instrumental with choir vocalise) by Elmer Bernstein, who had worked with Landis on National Lampoon's Animal House. Other songs in the film include:

No.	Title	Writer(s)	Artist	Length
1.	"Somebody Loan Me a Dime"	Fenton Robinson	Fenton Robinson (plays in the beginning of the film when Jake is escorted from his prison cell at Joliet)	2:59
2.	"Shake Your Moneymaker"	Elmore James	Elmore James (plays during the Brothers' visit with Curtis at the orphanage)	2:35
3.	"Soothe Me/Hold On! I'm Comin'"	Sam Cooke/Isaac Hayes and David Porter	Sam & Dave (both tracks playing on the Bluesmobile's 8-track player. The former when Jake and Elwood get pulled over by the police; latter when they are then chased after resisting arrest)	5:06
4.	"I Can't Turn You Loose"	Otis Redding	The Blues Brothers band (their theme song; plays during the smashing of the Mall and again when they are introduced at the Palace Hotel Ballroom, incorporating "Time Is Tight" by Booker T. and the M.G.'s)	1:18
5.	"Let the Good Times Roll"	Louis Jordan	Louis Jordan (plays on the record player in Elwood's corner of the flophouse)	2:49
6.	"Anema e core (Until)"	Salve d'Esposito	Ezio Pinza (plays when Jake and Elwood investigate Tom Malone and Lou Marini's old home)	2:15
7.	"Quando Quando Quando (When When When)"	Tony Renis, Alberto Testa	Five members of the Blues Brothers band (as "Murph & the Magic Tones", Murphy "Murph" Dunne, vocals and piano; Steve "The Colonel" Cropper, guitar; Willie "Too Big" Hall, drums; Donald "Duck" Dunn, bass; Tom "Bones" Malone, trombone) (plays in the Holiday Inn scene).
8.	"Just the Way You Are"	Billy Joel	Murph & the Magic Tones (instrumental plays while the Magic Tones discuss "putting the band back together" with Jake and Elwood)
9.	"Die Romantiker (The Romantics)"	Joseph Lanner	The waltz played during the restaurant scene at the Chez Paul
10.	"Boom Boom"	John Lee Hooker	John Lee Hooker (as "Street Slim"), vocals and guitar; Big Walter Horton (as "Tampa Pete"), harmonica; Pinetop Perkins (as "Luther Jackson"), electric piano; Willie "Big Eyes" Smith, drums; Luther "Guitar Junior" Johnson, guitar; Calvin "Fuzz" Jones, bass (plays in the Maxwell Street scene, short version in the theatrical cut, full-length in the extended cut). This was a live take.
11.	"Mama Lawdy"/"Boogie Chillen'"	John Lee Hooker	John Lee Hooker (plays in the film twice; first when Jake tries to phone Maury Sline, again when the band go to Bob's Country Bunker)	2:35
12.	"Horst-Wessel-Lied (a.k.a: "Die Fahne Hoch")"	Horst Wessel (lyrics by Wessel), melody of a song composed in 1865 by Peter Cornelius as the "Urmelodie" (source-melody).	Plays during the scene where the Head Illinois Nazi learns about "traffic menace" Elwood's address 1060 West Addison from a subordinate, before they drive to that address (Wrigley Field).	3:23
13.	"Your Cheatin' Heart"	Hank Williams	Kitty Wells (performed as the Blues Brothers enter Bob's Country Bunker)	2:38
14.	"Stand by Your Man"	Tammy Wynette and Billy Sherrill	The Blues Brothers (performed while at Bob's Country Bunker)
15.	"I'm Walkin'"	Fats Domino together with frequent collaborator Dave Bartholomew	Fats Domino (plays during the scenes where Jake, Elwood and the orphans promote the concert)	2:05
16.	"Ride of the Valkyries"	Richard Wagner	Pittsburgh Symphony Orchestra, conducted by William Steinberg (plays during the scene where the Illinois Nazis chase the Blues Brothers up an unfinished bridge near the end of the film)	4:40
17.	"The Girl From Ipanema"	Antônio Carlos Jobim	Played in the elevator as the Blues Brothers ride up to the 11th floor

== Sequel ==
The 1998 sequel, Blues Brothers 2000, had similar traits to the original, including large car-chase scenes and musical numbers. Landis returned to direct the film and Aykroyd reprised his role, joining John Goodman, Joe Morton and 10-year-old J. Evan Bonifant as the new Blues Brothers. Franklin and Brown were among the celebrities returning from the first film. John Belushi's memory was dedicated in the film as his character was killed off. There were also musical performances by Sam Moore, Wilson Pickett, Paul Shaffer, B.B. King and Eric Clapton, among others. Dozens of artists were packed into an all-star band called the Louisiana Gator Boys. Even with many returning cast members, the film was considered a box-office failure, generating a little over $14 million in ticket sales, and critics' reviews were mostly negative.

== Other works in the franchise ==
In 1980, the book Blues Brothers: Private was published, designed to help flesh out the universe in which the film takes place. Private was written and designed by Belushi's wife, Judith Jacklin, and Tino Insana, a friend of Belushi's from their days at The Second City.

The video game The Blues Brothers was released in 1991. It is a platform game in which the object is to evade police and other vigilantes to get to a blues concert.

In the 1990s, Film Roman was putting an animated series based on this film in the works, which was scheduled to be released in the fall of 1997. The brothers of Aykroyd and Belushi (Peter and Jim) were set to take their roles as the show's titular characters. The series was ultimately canceled because of casting complications.

== See also ==
- Minnie the Moocher
- List of cult films
