= Lou Marini =

American saxophonist, arranger, and composer (born 1945)

Lou Marini Jr.
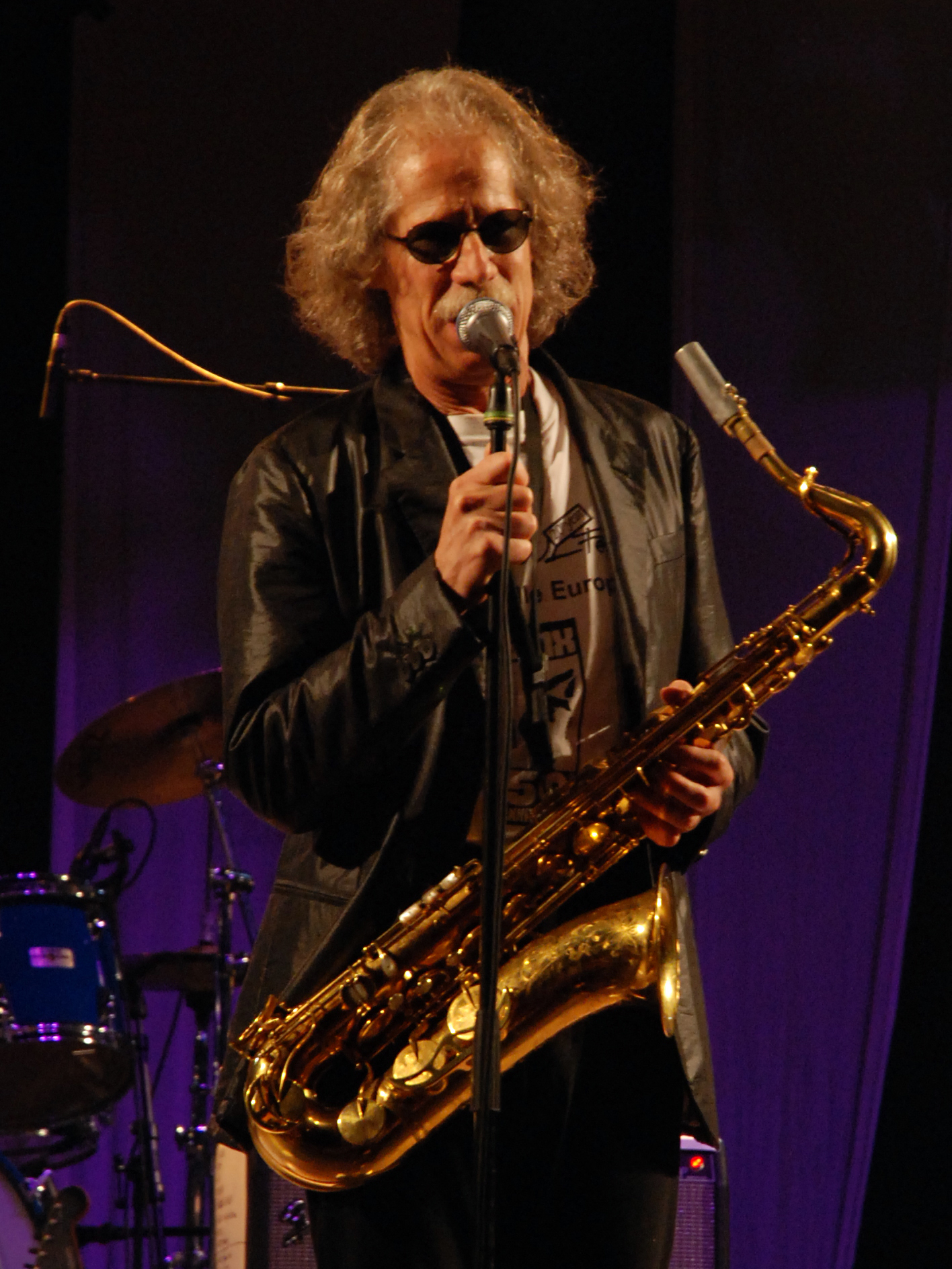
- Marini at the 2007 Hamar Music Festival in Hamar, Hedmark, Norway

Background information
- Also known as: Blue Lou
- Born: May 13, 1945 (age 81); Charleston, South Carolina, U.S.
- Genres: Blues, R&B, rock, pop, jazz, soul
- Occupation: Musician
- Instruments: Saxophone, clarinet, flute
- Years active: 1960–present
- Member of: The Blues Brothers
- Formerly of: Blood, Sweat & Tears; Saturday Night Live Band
- Website: blueloumarini.com

Louis Eugene Marini Jr. (born May 13, 1945), known as "Blue Lou" Marini, is an American saxophonist, arranger, and composer. He is best known for his work in jazz, rock, blues, and soul music, as well as his association with The Blues Brothers.

== Early life ==
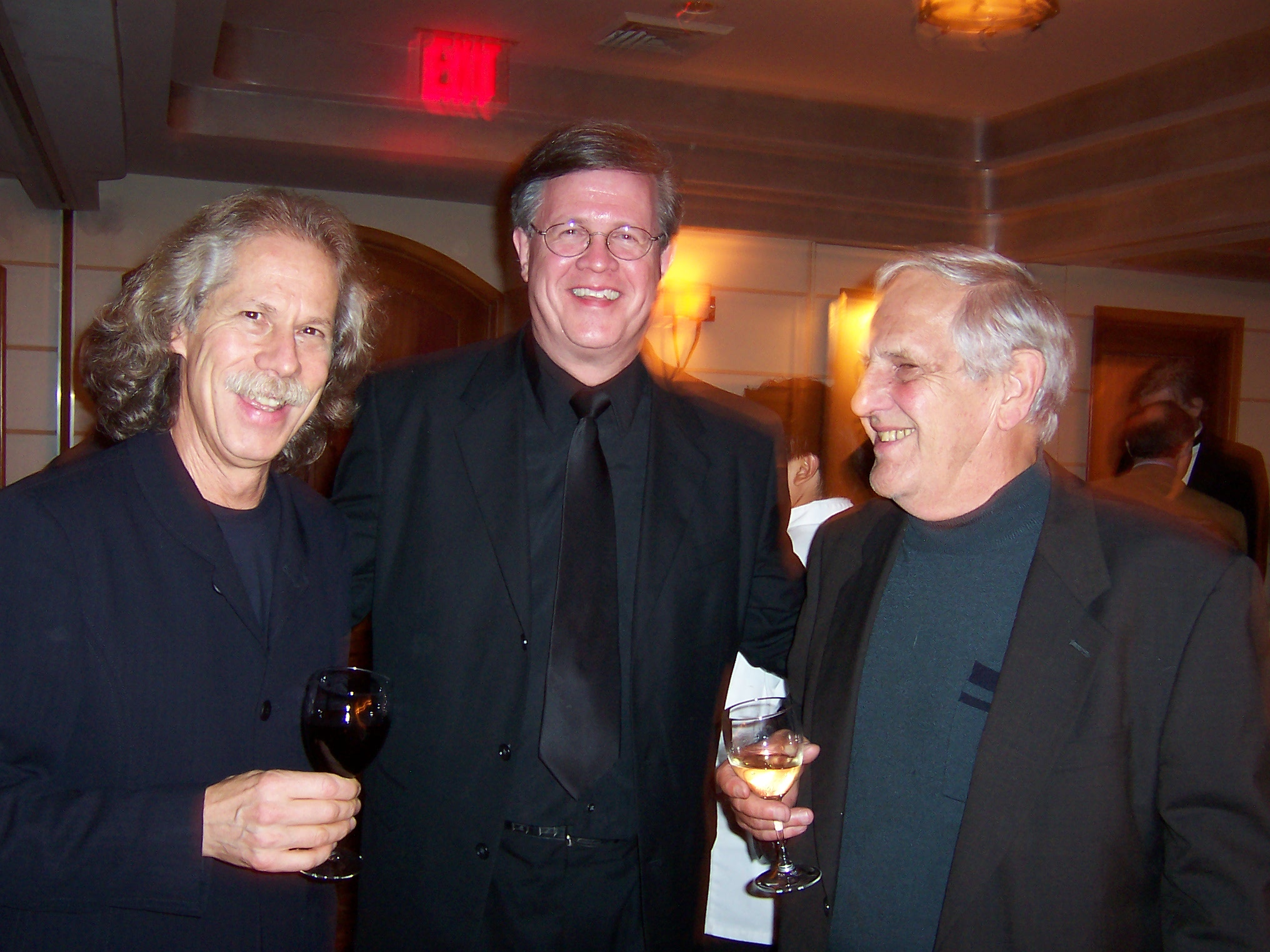
Left to right: Lou Marini, Ray Reach, and Ernie Stires at a reception following a Carnegie Hall concert, 2004

Marini was born in Charleston, South Carolina. His parents were Italian immigrants from the region of Trentino. He graduated from Fairless High School in Navarre, Ohio. His father, Lou Marini Sr., was the high school's band director and wrote the school song. Fairless bestows the annual Lou Marini Award in honor of Marini Sr. who died in May 2008. Both Lou Marini Sr. and Lou Marini Jr. were inducted into the Fairless Alumni Association Hall of Honor in May 2010. In June 2010, Marini Jr. was named artistic director at the first Brianza Blues Festival, in Villa Reale (Monza, Italy).

Marini attended North Texas State University College of Music (now known as the University of North Texas College of Music), where he played in the One O'Clock Lab Band. From 1972 to 1974 he played in Blood, Sweat & Tears. From 1975 to 1983, he was a member of the Saturday Night Live house band. He was a member of The Blues Brothers band, appearing in The Blues Brothers movie and its sequel, Blues Brothers 2000, playing the part of "Blue Lou", a moniker given by Dan Aykroyd.

He played on Frank Zappa's 1977 album Zappa in New York, on Cindy Bullens' 1978 album Desire Wire, and has worked with Aerosmith, Deodato, Maureen McGovern, Steely Dan, James Taylor, Dionne Warwick, the Buddy Rich Big Band, and the Woody Herman Orchestra.

== Solo work ==
Marini has spent most of his professional life working as a sideman and arranger. In 1986, he recorded a mournful, melancholy solo sax for the soundtrack of HBO's 1987 animated adaptation of Bernard Waber's children's book The House on East 88th St., which was released under the title Lyle, Lyle Crocodile. In 2004, he recorded his first recording as a bandleader, with Ray Reach and the Magic City Jazz Orchestra, titled Lou's Blues (2004). This album features his arrangements and compositions, many of which have become favorites for the Lab Bands at the University of North Texas. The liner notes of the album were written by Grammy Award-winning composer, arranger, and producer Bob Belden.

On March 23, 2010, he released Blue Lou and Misha Project - Highly Classified, a collaboration with Misha Segal, an Israeli pianist and composer.

== Compositions and arrangements ==
Marini's work as an arranger and composer has been influenced by Gil Evans, Bob Brookmeyer, Thad Jones, and Don Ellis, as well as rock, pop, and avant-garde music. For example, his song, "Hip Pickles," written for Blood, Sweat and Tears, is described by reviewer Jack Bowers of AllAboutJazz.com, as follows: "Marini's unorthodox notions surface on 'Hip Pickles,' whose free' intro gives way to a melody played by screaming trumpets and Clapton-like guitar, prefacing a stormy interchange between Marini (alto) and Tom Wolfe [on guitar]."

== Discography ==
=== Solo ===
- Lou's Blues 2001
- Highly Classified 2010
- Starmaker 2012

=== As guest ===
With The Blues Brothers

- Briefcase Full of Blues 1978
- The Blues Brothers: Music from the Soundtrack 1980
- Made in America 1980
- Best of The Blues Brothers 1981
- Dancin' wid da Blues Brothers 1983
- The Blues Brothers Band Live in Montreux 1990
- Red, White & Blues 1992
- The Very Best of The Blues Brothers 1995
- Blues Brothers & Friends: Live from Chicago's House of Blues 1997
- Blues Brothers 2000 1998

With Maureen McGovern

- Naughty Baby 1989
- Baby I'm Yours 1992
- Out of This World 1996
- Music Never Ends 1997

With John Tropea

- Short Trip to Space 1977
- To Touch You Again 1979
- NYC Cats Direct 1985
- The Chick Corea Songbook 2009

With Frank Zappa

- Zappa in New York 1978
- You Can't Do That on Stage Anymore, Vol. 6 1992
- Läther 1996
- Have I Offended Someone? 1997

With others

- Aerosmith – Night in the Ruts 1979
- Larry Applewhite – Larry Applewhite 1979
- Jesse Austin – Baby's Back 1995
- Patti Austin – Havana Candy 1977
- Carolyn Blackwell Sings Bernstein 1996
- Blood, Sweat & Tears – New Blood (1972)
- Blood, Sweat & Tears – No Sweat (1973)
- Boyzz – Too Wild to Tame 1978
- Brecker Brothers – Don't Stop the Music 1980
- Jimmy Buffett – Off to See the Lizard 1989
- Cindy Bullens – Desire Wire 1978
- Ann Hampton Callaway – Bring Back Romance 1994
- Cameo – Feel Me 1980
- Dina Carroll – So Close 1993
- Betty Carter - The Music Never Stops 2019
- Closer Than Ever – Closer Than Ever 1990
- Freddy Cole – It's Crazy, But I'm In Love1996
- Hank Crawford – Groove Master 1990
- Hank Crawford – South Central 1992
- Deodato – Night Cruiser 1980
- Manu Dibango – Gone Clear 1980
- Manu Dibango – Ambassador 1981
- Amy Drinkwater – With All My Heart – A Journey to the Soul 2005
- Cornell Dupree – Coast to Coast 1988
- Eric Essix – SuperBlue 2006
- Donald Fagen – Kamakiriad 1993
- Family Thing – Family Thing 1996
- Steven Feifke – Point of View 2025
- Robben Ford – The Inside Story 1979
- Aretha Franklin – Get It Right (1983)
- Michael Franks – Tiger in the Rain 1979
- The J. Geils Band – Freeze Frame 1981
- The J. Geils Band – Houseparty: Anthology 1992
- Michael Gibbs – Big Music 1988
- Levon Helm – Levon Helm & the RCO All-Stars 1977
- Levon Helm – Levon Helm 1978
- Lena Horne – Live On Broadway 1981
- Bobbi Humphrey – Good Life 1979
- Denise Jannah – I Was Born In Love With You 1995
- Garland Jeffreys – Guts for Love 1983
- Eddie King – Another Cow's Dead 1997
- D.C. LaRue – Laso 1977
- D. C. Larue – Ten Dance 1977
- Fred Lipsius - Better Believe It (mja Records, 1996)
- Love & Money – Strange Kind of Love 1988
- Melanie – Phonogenic – Not Just Another Pretty Face 1978
- Magnet – Worldwide Attraction 1979
- Mike Mandel – Sky Music 1978
- Meat Loaf – Dead Ringer 1981
- Elliott Murphy – Night Lights 1976
- Walter Murphy – A Fifth of Beethoven 1976
- Milton Nascimento – Angelus (flute) 1994
- Claude Nougaro – Nougayork 1987
- Laura Nyro – Walk the Dog and Light the Light 1993
- Linda Clifford – I'll Keep on Loving You 1982
- Jill O'Hara – Jill O'Hara 1993
- One O'clock Lab Band – Best of One O'clock 1992
- Eddie Palmieri – Unfinished Masterpiece 1990
- Tom Pierson – Planet of Tears 1996
- Andy Pratt – Shiver in the Night 1977
- Raw Stylus – Pushing Against the Flow 1995
- Lou Reed – Sally Can't Dance 1974
- Repercussions – Earth and Heaven 1995
- Jess Band Roden – Player Not the Game 1977
- Joe Roccisano – Shape I'm In 1993
- Joe Roccisano – Leave Your Mind Behind 1995
- Lalo Schifrin – Towering Toccata 1976
- Neil Sedaka – A Song 1977
- Carly Simon – Hello Big Man 1983
- Ray Simpson – Ray Simpson 1992
- Phoebe Snow – Something Real 1989
- Spyro Gyra – City Kids 1983
- Marvin Stamm – Stampede 1983
- Ringo Starr – Ringo's Rotogravure 1976
- Steely Dan – Two Against Nature 2000
- Sunshine – Sunshine (1972)
- T. Life – That's Life 1978
- Kate Taylor – Kate Taylor 1978
- B.J. Thomas – Songs 1973
- B.J. Thomas – Longhorn & London Bridges 1974
- Harvey Thomas Young – Highways of Gold 1995
- Peter Tosh – Mystic Man 1979
- Peter Tosh – Wanted Dread & Alive 1981
- Luther Vandross – Forever, For Always, For Love 1982
- Thijs Van leer – Nice to Have Met You 1978
- Dionne Warwick – Dionne Warwick Sings Cole Porter 1990*
