= J. Evan Bonifant =

American actor

- Born: James Evan Bonifant; August 19, 1985 (age 41)
- Other name: Evan Bonifant
- Occupation: Actor
- Years active: 1991–present

J. Evan Bonifant (born August 19, 1985) is an American actor. As a child actor, he played small parts on television shows such as One Life to Live and starred in several films, including the lead role in Todd Haynes's Dottie Gets Spanked in 1993. His most notable role was that of Tum Tum, for which he was nominated the Young Artist Award in 1994 in 3 Ninjas Kick Back. He portrayed ten-year-old Buster Blues in Blues Brothers 2000. In 2008, Bonifant portrayed the role of Jerko Phoenix in the Disney series Wizards of Waverly Place.
