= List of largest local police departments in the United States =

This is a list of the 25 largest municipal police departments in the United States as defined by the Bureau of Justice Statistics, by numbers of full-time sworn personnel.

Rank	Department	State/Territory	Number of full-time sworn officers	As of (with reference)
1	New York City Police Department (NYPD)	New York	33,975	July 2026
2	Chicago Police Department (CPD)	Illinois	11,478	August 2026
3	Los Angeles Police Department (LAPD)	California	8,621	May 2026
4	Houston Police Department (HPD)	Texas	5,420	June 2026
5	Philadelphia Police Department (PPD)	Pennsylvania	5,347	June 2025
6	Las Vegas Metropolitan Police Department (LVMPD)	Nevada	3,485	2024
7	Dallas Police Department (DPD)	Texas	3,383	January 2026
8	Metropolitan Police Department of the District of Columbia (MPDC)	District of Columbia	3,165	August 2026
9	Suffolk County Police Department (SCPD)	New York	2,654	April 2026
10	Detroit Police Department (DPD)	Michigan	2,602	March 2026
11	Nassau County Police Department (NCPD)	New York	2,497	September 2025
12	Phoenix Police Department (PPD)	Arizona	2,400 (approximate)	March 2026
13	San Antonio Police Department (SAPD)	Texas	2,383	September 2025
14	Baltimore Police Department (BPD)	Maryland	2,186	January 2026
15	Boston Police Department (BPD)	Massachusetts	2,127	April 2026
16	Columbus Division of Police (CPD)	Ohio	1,904	February 2026
17	Memphis Police Department (MPD)	Tennessee	1,902	November 2025
18	San Francisco Police Department (SFPD)	California	1,899	May 2026
19	Fort Worth Police Department (FWPD)	Texas	1,832	February 2026
20	San Diego Police Department (SDPD)	California	1,822	February 2026
21	Atlanta Police Department (APD)	Georgia	1,810 (approximate)	February 2026
22	Charlotte-Mecklenburg Police Department (CMPD)	North Carolina	1,656 (approximate)	April 2026
23	Baltimore County Police Department (BCoPD)	Maryland	1,643 (approximate)	April 2026
24	Milwaukee Police Department (MPD)	Wisconsin	1,587	September 2025
25	Metropolitan Nashville Police Department (MNPD)	Tennessee	1,586	June 2026
