= Murphy Dunne =

American actor and musician

- Born: George Dunne; June 22, 1942 (age 84); Chicago, Illinois
- Occupations: Actor, musician
- Years active: 1969–present

George "Murphy" Dunne (born June 22, 1942) is an American actor and musician. He played "Murph", the keyboardist for the Blues Brothers, in the 1980 film The Blues Brothers, a role he reprised in the sequel, Blues Brothers 2000.

== Biography ==
Dunne grew up in Chicago, the son of Agnes and George Dunne. He has two sisters, Mary and Eileen. In the late 1960s he became Precinct Captain of the 42nd ward, also known as Rush Street. Rush Street was home to many music venues and while visiting the clubs Dunne decided to pursue an active career in show business. He started playing piano in a back room of Lake Shore Park and joined one of the early 1970s comedy ensembles, The Conception Corporation.

In 1968 he joined the improvisational theatre company The Second City.

In 1969 Dunne co-produced Chicago's first Free Blues Festival at Grant Park Band Shell, where he met Willie Dixon, Albert King and his future Blues Brothers band-mate Steve Cropper.

In 1977 Dunne had a small role as a keyboard player in Joan Tewkesbury's Old Boyfriends, where he met John Belushi.

In 1979 Dunne played keyboards for Lenny and the Squigtones on the album Lenny & Squiggy Present Lenny and the Squigtones, under the pseudonym Lars Svenki.

In September 1992, he performed a solo piece entitled "Murphy Dunne Nevertheless" at the Globe Playhouse in West Hollywood, California. It was co-written with Lewis Arquette.

== The Blues Brothers ==
Dunne won the role in The Blues Brothers after their original pianist, Paul Shaffer, could not accept the part due to his contractual obligations with Saturday Night Live, as well as his choice to take part in Gilda Live. Dunne played himself in both of the two Blues Brothers films, with a fictional storyline: Murphy "Murph" Dunne was an original member of the Blues Brothers until "Joliet" Jake went to prison in the 1970s. He then started his own band called "Murph and the MagicTones" along with four other ex-Blues Brothers Band members; Donald "Duck" Dunn, Steve "The Colonel" Cropper, Willie "Too Big" Hall and Tom "Bones" Malone. While performing a regular set at the Armada Room in a Chicago area Holiday Inn, Jake and Elwood Blues again approached the band to reform the Blues Brothers band. After a brief tour, Murph was sent to prison with the rest of the Blues Brothers Band.

When the real-life Blues Brothers toured in 1980 to promote the film, Dunne performed live with the band along with Shaffer. His work can be heard on their 1980 live album, Made in America.

== Film career ==
Dunne also appeared in Chesty Anderson, USN (1976), the disaster spoof The Big Bus (1976), Mel Brooks's High Anxiety (1977) as a lounge-room piano player, three commercial parody films: Tunnel Vision (1976), Prime Time a.k.a. American Raspberry (1977) and Loose Shoes (1980); and the teen comedy Bad Manners (a.k.a. Growing Pains) (1984). He played a court stenographer in the movie Oh, God! (1977). Later films include The Main Event (1979), The Last Married Couple in America (1980), Honky Tonk Freeway (1981), Perfect (1985), Hero and the Terror (1988), Phoenix (1998) and The Mothman Prophecies (2002). He has also acted in numerous television shows including Night Court as well as working as a voice actor, and can be heard in Cowboy Bebop: The Movie, Ghost in the Shell: Stand Alone Complex and in the game, Star Trek: Klingon Academy.

== Discography ==
- 1977: The Love Theme Loose Shoes / Coming Attractions (Atlantic)
- 1992: Nevertheless (Angst Music)
- 2011: Pavlov Rang My Bell (self-produced)
