= Alan Rubin =

American musician (1943–2011)

- Also known as: Mr. Fabulous
- Born: February 11, 1943; Brooklyn, New York City
- Died: June 8, 2011 (aged 68) Manhattan, New York City
- Genres: Blues, jazz, R&B
- Occupation: Musician
- Instruments: Trumpet, flugelhorn, piccolo trumpet
- Years active: 1959–2011

Alan Rubin (February 11, 1943 – June 8, 2011) was an American musician. He played trumpet, flugelhorn, and piccolo trumpet.

== Early life and education ==
Rubin was born in Brooklyn. He began attending Juilliard School of Music in New York when he was 17 and studied with William Vacchiano, who was principal trumpet in the New York Philharmonic. Vacchiano described Rubin as his best student. While at Juilliard, Rubin was invited to play with Paul Hindemith on his last concert tour of the United States, but Rubin chose instead to play with Peggy Lee at the Village Vanguard. Rubin dropped out of Juilliard at 20 to tour with singer Robert Goulet as his lead trumpet player.

== Career ==
Rubin was a member of the Saturday Night Live Band, with whom he played at the Closing Ceremony of the 1996 Olympic Games. As a member of The Blues Brothers, he portrayed Mr. Fabulous in the 1980 film and the 1998 sequel, and was a member of the touring band. In the first film, Rubin's character is maitre d' at an expensive restaurant before Jake and Elwood persuade him to rejoin the band. The nickname "Mr. Fabulous" was given to Rubin by John Belushi.

Rubin played with an array of artists, such as Frank Sinatra, Frank Zappa, Duke Ellington, Blood, Sweat & Tears, Gil Evans, Eumir Deodato, Sting, Aerosmith, The Rolling Stones, Paul Simon, James Taylor, Frankie Valli, Eric Clapton, Billy Joel, B.B. King, Miles Davis, Yoko Ono, Peggy Lee, Aretha Franklin, James Brown, Ray Charles, Cab Calloway, and Dr. John. Rubin contributed to over 6000 recording sessions.

Rubin's last performance was with The Blues Brotherhood (Blues Brothers tribute show) at B.B. King's in New York City on October 12, 2010. The performance also featured Tom "Bones" Malone and "Blue Lou" Marini.

== Death ==
Rubin died from lung cancer on June 8, 2011, at Memorial Sloan Kettering Cancer Center in Manhattan.

== Discography ==
With Patti Austin

- Havana Candy (CTI, 1977)

With Gato Barbieri

- Chapter Three: Viva Emiliano Zapata (Impulse!, 1974)

With George Benson

- White Rabbit (CTI, 1972)
- Bad Benson (CTI, 1974)

With The Blues Brothers

- Briefcase Full of Blues (Atlantic, 1978)
- The Blues Brothers (Atlantic, 1980)
- Made in America (Atlantic, 1980)
- The Blues Brothers Band Live in Montreux (Atlantic, 1990)
- Red, White & Blues (Turnstyle, 1992)
- Blues Brothers 2000 (Universal, 1998)

With Hue and Cry

- Remote (Circa, 1988)

With Jimmy Buffett

- Off to See the Lizard (MCA, 1989)

With Ron Carter

- Anything Goes (Kudu, 1975)

With Stanley Clarke

- School Days (Nemperor, 1976)

With Linda Clifford

- I'll Keep On Loving You (Capitol, 1982)

With Hank Crawford

- Wildflower (Kudu, 1973)
- I Hear a Symphony (Kudu, 1975)
- Mr. Chips (Milestone Records, 1986)
- Night Beat (Milestone, 1989)
- Groove Master (Milestone, 1990)
- Tight (Milestone, 1996)

With Sheena Easton

- No Sound But a Heart (EMI, 1987)

With Donald Fagen

- Kamakiriad (Reprise, 1993)

With Aretha Franklin

- Get It Right (Arista, 1983)

With Gloria Gaynor

- Experience Gloria Gaynor (MGM, 1975)
- I've Got You (Polydor, 1976)
- Glorious (Polydor, 1977)

With Johnny Hammond

- Higher Ground (Kudu, 1973)

With Levon Helm

- Levon Helm & the RCO All-Stars (ABC, 1977)
- Levon Helm (ABC, 1978)

With Jennifer Holliday

- Say You Love Me (Geffen, 1985)

With Cissy Houston

- Think It Over (Private Stock, 1978)

With Jackie and Roy

- Time & Love (CTI, 1972)

With Garland Jeffreys

- One-Eyed Jack (A&M, 1978)
- Guts for Love (Epic, 1982)

With Billy Joel

- The Bridge (1986)

With Hubert Laws

- Morning Star (CTI, 1972)

With O'Donel Levy

- Simba (Groove Merchant, 1974)

With Fred Lipsius

- Better Believe It (mja Records, 1996)

With Herbie Mann

- Brazil: Once Again (Atlantic, 1977)

With Jimmy McGriff

- Red Beans (Groove Merchant, 1976)
- Tailgunner (LRC, 1977)

With Sinéad O'Connor

- Am I Not Your Girl? (Chrysalis, 1992)

With Yoko Ono

- A Story (Rykodisc, 1997)

With Lou Reed

- Sally Can't Dance (RCA, 1974)

With Don Sebesky

- Giant Box (CTI, 1973)

With Carly Simon

- Hello Big Man (Warner Bros., 1983)

With Paul Simon

- Graceland (Warner Bros., 1986)

With Lonnie Smith

- Keep on Lovin' (Groove Merchant, 1976)

With Phoebe Snow

- Never Letting Go (Columbia, 1977)

With Ringo Starr

- Ringo's Rotogravure (Polydor, 1976)

With James Taylor

- Walking Man (Warner Bros., 1974)

With Tina Turner

- Love Explosion (United Artists, 1979)

With Stanley Turrentine

- Nightwings (Fantasy, 1977)

With Frankie Valli

- Closeup (Private Stock, 1975)

With Randy Weston

- Blue Moses (CTI, 1972)

With Jim Steinman

- Bad for Good (Epic, 1981)

With Frank Sinatra

- L.A. Is My Lady (Qwest, 1984; rereleased, 2004, Frank Sinatra Enterprises)

== Filmography ==
Title	Year	Credit(s)	Role	Notes
Saturday Night Live	1976-1984	Musician	Trumpet	Music department
Saturday Night Live	1976-1982	The Blues Brothers Band	Trumpet	Uncredited
The Blues Brothers	1980	Actor	Mr. Fabulous	
Blues Brothers 2000	1998	Actor	Mr. Fabulous	
