= Matt "Guitar" Murphy =

American blues guitarist and singer-songwriter (1929–2018)

Matt Murphy
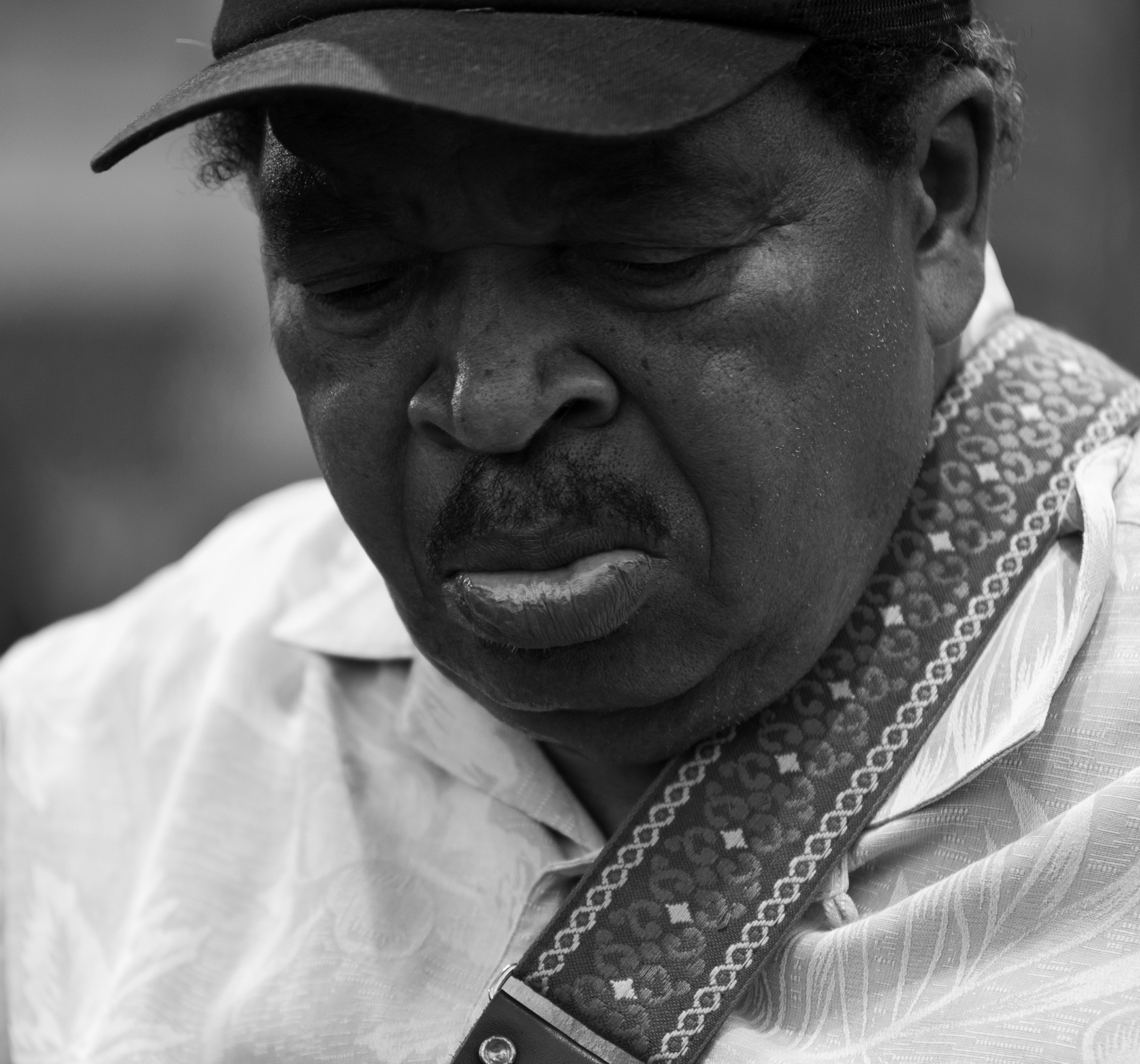
- Murphy in 2010

Background information
- Also known as: Matt "Guitar" Murphy
- Born: Matthew Tyler Murphy; December 29, 1929; Sunflower, Mississippi, U.S.
- Died: June 15, 2018 (aged 88) Miami, Florida, U.S.
- Genres: Blues
- Instruments: Guitar, vocals
- Years active: 1948–2018
- Labels: Antone's, Roesch, Bluzpik

Matthew Tyler Murphy (December 29, 1929 – June 15, 2018), known as Matt "Guitar" Murphy, was an American blues guitarist and singer-songwriter. He was associated with Memphis Slim, The Blues Brothers and Howlin' Wolf. In 2012, Murphy was elected to the Blues Hall of Fame.

== Early life ==
Murphy was born in Sunflower, Mississippi, and was educated in Memphis, Tennessee, where his father worked at the Peabody Hotel. Murphy learned to play guitar when he was a child.

== Career ==
In 1948, Murphy moved to Chicago, where he joined the Howlin' Wolf Band, which at the time featured Little Junior Parker. In 1952, Murphy recorded with Little Junior Parker and Ike Turner, resulting in the release, "You're My Angel" / "Bad Women, Bad Whiskey" (Modern 864), credited to Little Junior Parker and the Blue Flames.

Murphy worked often with Memphis Slim, including on his debut album At the Gate of Horn (1959). Murphy recorded two albums and many singles with Chuck Berry and was also featured in works by Koko Taylor, Sonny Boy Williamson II, Buddy Guy, Etta James, and Otis Rush. He also performed with Willie Dixon. Freddie King is said to have once admitted that he based his "Hide Away" (1960) on Murphy's playing.

He gave a memorable performance in 1963 on the American Folk Blues Festival tour of Europe with his "Matt's Guitar Boogie".

In the 1970s, Murphy associated with harmonica player James Cotton, recording over six albums. Dan Aykroyd and John Belushi attended one of their performances and subsequently asked Murphy to join the touring band of The Blues Brothers. Murphy appeared in the films The Blues Brothers (1980) and Blues Brothers 2000 (1998), playing the husband of Aretha Franklin. He performed with the Blues Brothers Band until the early 2000s.

Murphy was inducted into the Blues Hall of Fame in 2012.

== Equipment ==
Murphy's first signature guitar was manufactured by Cort Guitars. He visited the Cort factory in Korea in 1998, and later that year the MGM-1 was introduced. Most of these guitars have a sunburst or honey finish. They are made of agathis, with a mahogany neck, and have two humbuckers and single volume and tone controls. This model was produced until 2006; 78 were sold, according to factory numbers. In 2011, Matt started playing Delaney Guitars and had a signature model made by Mike Delaney which he played until he died in 2018.

== Personal life and death ==
Murphy suffered a stroke in the summer of 2002, but returned to perform a few years later. In 2011, at a private ceremony in South Miami, Florida, he married Kathy Hemrick. The couple later hosted a public reception at Fort Lauderdale, Florida, at which the CD Last Call was released.

Murphy resided in Miami until he died from a heart attack on June 15, 2018, at age 88. His death was first announced on Facebook by his nephew Floyd Murphy Jr., who performed alongside his uncle.

== Solo discography ==
=== Way Down South (1990) ===
Way Down South was Murphy's debut solo album, first released in 1990 with Discovery. It included contributions by his brother Floyd, and remained his most critically acclaimed solo project.

=== The Blues Don't Bother Me! (1996) ===
The Blues Don't Bother Me! was Murphy's second solo album, and the first released with Roesch Records. His nephew, Floyd Murphy Jr. played drums and co-composed two songs, and the label's namesake and executive producer, Joe Roesch, played drums on one song. Reception was more mixed. The title recording, "The Blues Don't Bother Me", was licensed by Universal Records as the second track on the Blues Brothers 2000 Original Motion Picture Soundtrack which earned the RIAA Certified Gold Award of 500,000 units sold on March 16, 1998.

=== Lucky Charm (2000) ===
Lucky Charm was Murphy's third solo album, first released in 2000 with Roesch. It included contributions by his fellow Blues Brothers musicians Lou Marini and Alan Rubin, credited as The Blues Brothers Horns.

==== Track listing ====
All tracks are written by Matt "Guitar" Murphy

No.	Title	Length
1.	"Boogie Overture"	7:18
2.	"What's Up With You, Baby?"	3:18
3.	"Who's Got the Puddy"	4:18
4.	"Good Luck Charm"	3:58
5.	"I Remember"	4:41
6.	"Got Me a Carrying Stick"	6:44
7.	"J.F.A."	6:07
8.	"Willie Mae"	6:02
9.	"On No, I'm Falling in Love Again"	4:50
10.	"Time to Move On"	4:45
11.	"Headin' Northwest"	2:33

==== Personnel ====
- Matt "Guitar" Murphy – composer, primary artist, bass, guitar (electric), vocals
- Sax Gordon – guest artist, tenor saxophone, vocals (background)
- The Blues Brothers Horns – horn section
- Birch Johnson – trombone
- Alan Rubin – trumpet
- Lou Marini – tenor saxophone
- Floyd Murphy Jr. – drums, guitar, vocals (background)
- Leon Pendarvis – keyboards, organ, vocals
- Tom Barney – bass
- Scott Spray – bass
- Howard Eldridge – vocals
- David Foster – vocals (background)
- Sable Roesch – vocals (background)
- Vic Steffens – vocals (background)
- Matt "Guitar" Murphy – producer
- Sable Roesch – executive producer, art direction, vocals (background)
- Joe Roesch – executive producer, art direction, mixing, photography, vocals (background)
- Robert Sauber – cover painting, design
- Vic Steffens – engineer, mixing

=== Last Call (2010) ===
Last Call was Murphy's last solo album, released in 2010 with Bluzpik. It was a live album featuring many popular blues songs and an instrumental guitar jam.

=== Appearances ===
With Sonny Boy Williamson

- The Real Folk Blues (Chess, 1947-64 [1966])

== See also ==
- List of Chicago blues musicians
- List of guitarists by genre
- Long Beach Blues Festival
- San Francisco Blues Festival
