= Little Anthony =

- Also known as: Little Anthony
- Born: Jerome Gourdine; January 8, 1941 (age 85)
- Genres: Soul
- Instrument: Vocals
- Years active: 1957–present
- Member of: Little Anthony and the Imperials

Jerome Gourdine (born January 8, 1941), known as Little Anthony, is an American singer, best known for leading Little Anthony and the Imperials, an American rhythm and blues, doo-wop, and soul vocal group from New York City founded by Clarence Collins in the 1950s. Gourdine was known for his high tenor voice. In addition to Collins and Gourdine, the original Imperials included Ernest Wright, Glouster "Nate" Rogers, and Tracy Lord, the last two of whom were later replaced by Sammy Strain.

== Career ==
He formed The Duponts before joining the Chesters, who were later renamed The Imperials and then Little Anthony and the Imperials.

Despite the fact he is 5'9", legendary rock and roll DJ Alan Freed gave Gourdine the nickname and stage name "Little Anthony" because of "the youthful quality in [Gourdine's] voice". Freed and another DJ/promoter, Murray Kaufman (more well-known as Murray the K) helped the group's career by playing their records and booking them for concerts.

Their first single with their new name was 1958's "Tears on My Pillow", one of the biggest hits of the year. It sold over one million copies, and the group was awarded a gold disc by the RIAA. Its B-side was "Two People in the World". Their next several singles flopped, despite the Rock and Roll Hall of Fame and Museum's view that they were "strong" choices for singles. Their 1960 single, the uptempo "Shimmy, Shimmy, Ko-Ko-Bop", was their next hit. When their success dwindled in 1961, Gourdine left to attempt a solo career and pursue acting.

He returned to the group in 1963, replacing Kenny Seymour. The group's classic line-up – Gourdine, Ernest Wright, Clarence Collins, and Sammy Strain – was now complete. With the help of record producer/songwriter Teddy Randazzo (a childhood friend of the group), the Imperials found success on the new DCP (Don Costa Productions) label and were able to compete with the British Invasion and Motown with several dramatic pop-soul records "I'm on the Outside (Looking In)" (1964), "Goin' Out of My Head" (1964), "Hurt So Bad" (1965), "I Miss You So" (1965), "Take Me Back" (1965), "Hurt" (1966), "Better Use Your Head" (1966), and "Out of Sight, Out of Mind" (1969). "Goin' Out of My Head" and "Hurt So Bad" were consecutive top 10 pop hits on the Billboard Hot 100, reaching #6 and #10, respectively.

Gourdine and the group performed on multiple television series, including Shindig! Hullabaloo, Kraft Music Hall, Soul Train, American Bandstand, The Midnight Special, and The Tonight Show. At the height of their career, the group made two appearances on The Ed Sullivan Show, at the time television's top talent entertainment showcase, on March 28, 1965, and again on January 25, 1970.

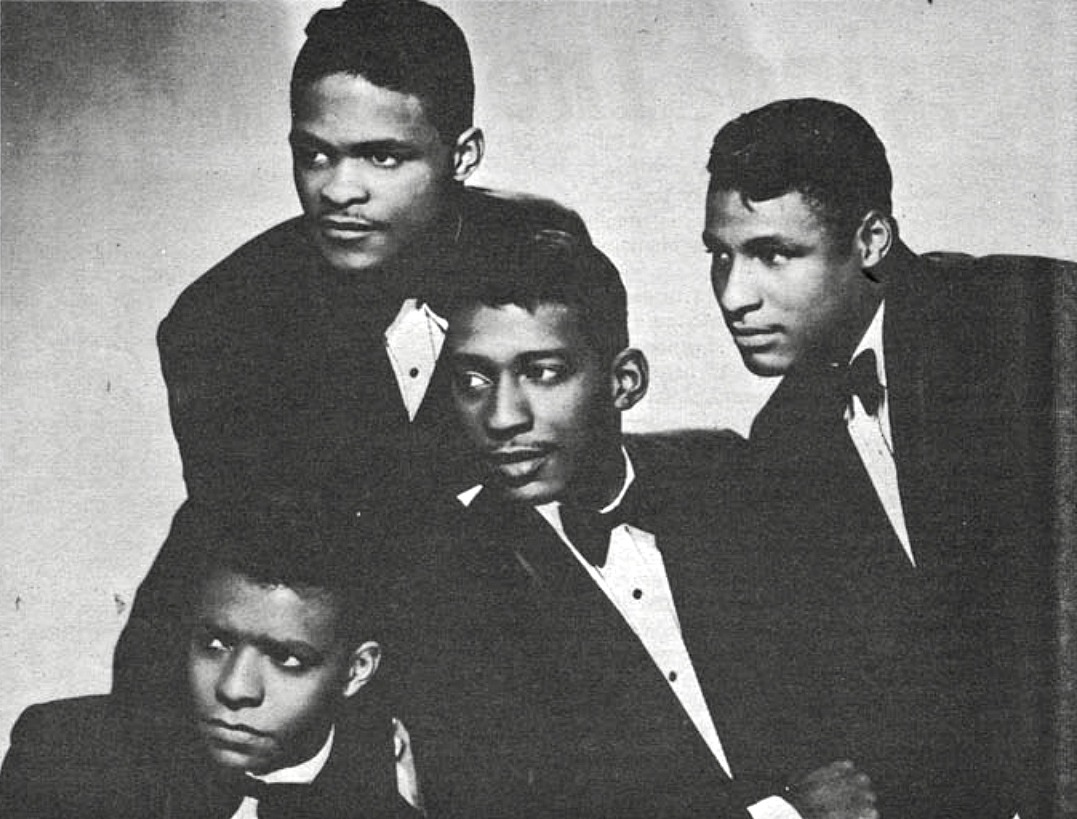
Little Anthony and the Imperials in 1967

Their final moderate hit on Billboard's R&B Singles chart was "I'm Falling in Love with You" (1974), which peaked at #25.

In 1975, Gourdine left for a second (and more successful) attempt at a solo career.

On January 10, 1992, Gourdine, Collins, Wright, and Strain reunited for a concert (called "Royalty of Rock: The Ultimate Reunion") at Madison Square Garden, alongside Dion & the Belmonts and Ronnie Spector, plus a one-off reunion of several former members of the Drifters (which included Ben E. King, Charlie Thomas, Johnny Moore, and Barry Hobbs). This reunion proved to be a success. When the decision was made for the foursome to tour together again, 1992, the year of the group's reformation, was also the 40th anniversary of Dick Clark's American Bandstand, and he invited the Imperials to appear as part of the televised special celebration.

In 1996, they recorded their first live album, Little Anthony & the Imperials – Live: Up Close & Personal. On August 30, 1997, the group was featured on NBC's Today show as part of that show's "Summer Concert Series". In the early 2000s, they appeared on three popular PBS television specials: Rock, Rhythm, and Doo-Wop and Red, White and Rock in 2002; and Soul Spectacular: 40 Years of R&B in 2003. Also, during this period, they recorded Pure Acapella, an all a cappella CD showcasing the group's vocal talents on several classic 1950s doo-wop songs, including their own hit, "Two People in the World", which was written by Imperials member Ernest Wright. These two recordings marked the first time that the classic line-up had recorded together in over 30 years.

In 2008, Little Anthony and the Imperials released their first new album in several years, entitled You'll Never Know, and they performed on the Late Show with David Letterman on August 26, 2008.

On January 14, 2009, it was announced that Little Anthony and the Imperials had been inducted into the Rock and Roll Hall of Fame. Gourdine, Wright, Collins, Strain, and Rogers were present to be honored. Deceased original Imperials member Tracy Lord was inducted posthumously; his sons accepted his Rock and Roll Hall of Fame induction on his behalf. The group was inducted by Smokey Robinson.

In October 2009, the group performed "Two People in the World" at the 25th Anniversary Rock & Roll Hall of Fame Concert.

In 2012, the Imperials were (along with the Dells), one of the few 1950s-era R&B groups still touring with a majority of their original members (Gourdine, Collins, and Wright).

In early 2014, Gourdine toured the UK with David Gest's Legends of Soul, when he performed "Tears on My Pillow" and "Goin' Out of My Head". The same year, he released his biography, Little Anthony: My Journey, My Destiny, recounting his life, his memories, and his years with The Imperials.

In 2018, Little Anthony and the Imperials were inducted into the Rhythm and Blues Music Hall of Fame in Detroit.

As of 2018, The Imperials were still performing. Imperials founder Collins, now retired, has been replaced by Johnny Britt. De Blanc and original members Wright and Gourdine round out the group. When the group is not touring, Gourdine does stage plays and currently also has a one-man show, which he is currently doing to support his recently released biography, and to celebrate his 55-plus years as a performer.

The group's most recent performance took place in May 2022. Since then, Gourdine (with Britt) has performed on the Happy Together Tour headlined by the Turtles in 2023 and 2025.

On April 24, 2023, Little Anthony & The Imperials were inducted into the newly established, Atlantic City Walk Of Fame presented by, The National R&B Music Society Inc. Little Anthony, Clarence Collins, Ernest Wright, Nate Rogers, and Sammy Strain were all in attendance to accept the honor. It was the first time all five were together since The Rock & Roll Hall of Fame induction in 2009. Norman Burnett of the vocal group The Tymes inducted the group. James Brown, The Delfonics and Grover Washington Jr., were also inducted in the inaugural class.

== Awards ==
Little Anthony and the Imperials received the Rhythm and Blues Foundation's Pioneer Award in 1993. They were inducted into the Vocal Group Hall of Fame in 1999 and the Long Island Music Hall of Fame on October 15, 2006. In 2007, the Imperials were inducted into the Hit Parade Hall of Fame On January 14, 2009, it was announced that Little Anthony and the Imperials had been inducted into the Rock and Roll Hall of Fame; they were inducted on April 4. Gourdine, Wright, Collins, Strain, and Rogers were present to be honored. Deceased original Imperials member Tracy Lord was inducted posthumously; his sons accepted his Rock and Roll Hall of Fame induction on his behalf. The group was inducted by Smokey Robinson.

In 2014, Goldmine magazine inducted the Imperials into The Goldmine Hall of Fame. Editor Phil Marder referred to them as one of the few 1950s doo-wop groups (though the group hated that label) to consistently chart hits during the British Invasion. Goldmine also named Little Anthony and the Imperials as one of The 20 Greatest Doo-Wop Groups of All Time.

In 2018, Little Anthony and the Imperials were inducted into the Rhythm and Blues Music Hall of Fame in Detroit.

On April 24, 2023, Little Anthony & The Imperials were inducted into the newly established, Atlantic City Walk Of Fame presented by, The National R&B Music Society Inc. Little Anthony, Clarence Collins, Ernest Wright, Nate Rogers, and Sammy Strain were all in attendance to accept the honor. It was the first time all five were together since The Rock & Roll Hall of Fame induction in 2009. Norman Burnett of the vocal group, The Tymes inducted the group. James Brown, The Delfonics and Grover Washington Jr., were also inducted in the inaugural class.

== Early and personal life ==
Gourdine was born to Victoria Stafford and Thomas Elliot Gourdine. His parents and his three brothers were also involved in music; his mother sang in The Nazareth Baptist with her three sisters, and his father played saxophone while being employed as an electrician during the second world war. He grew up in the Fort Greene area of Brooklyn in New York City, and attended Boys High School.

Anthony has been married twice. He was married to his first wife, Judy Fouseca, from 1961 to 1963 and had four children with her; they remarried in 1967, moved to Baldwin Hills and then Los Angeles, and divorced again in 1974.

Gourdine has been married to his second wife, Linda, for over forty years and has five children with her. (Gourdine's wife Linda is the twin sister of Brenda Collins, the ex-wife of Gourdine's fellow Imperial co-founder Clarence Collins.) They live in Las Vegas. He has nine children, thirteen grandchildren and twelve great-grandchildren.
