= I Miss You So =

Vocal jazz song released in 1940

Single by Cats and the Fiddle
- B-side: "Public Jitterbug No. 1"
- Released: May 1940
- Genre: Vocal jazz
- Label: Bluebird
- Songwriters: Jimmie Henderson; John Scott; Sid Robin

Cats and the Fiddle singles chronology
"We Cats Will Swing for You" (1939)	"I Miss You So" (1940)	"Left with the Thought of You" (1940)

"I Miss You So" is a song written by Jimmie Henderson, John Scott and Sid Robin. It was originally recorded by American group, the Cats and the Fiddle, whose version became an American standard and reached the US top 20 in 1940. It has since been notably covered by several artists who made international charts with their versions. Among them was Chris Connor in 1956, Paul Anka in 1959 and Little Anthony and the Imperials in 1965.

== Cats and the Fiddle original version ==
Vocal harmony group, the Cats and the Fiddle, recorded 42 sides during their career, among them being the song "I Miss You So." Composed by Jimmie Henderson, John Scott and Sid Robin, the tune was a ballad that describes longing for a romantic relationship. The group's version was recorded as a foxtrot shuffle featuring tipple instrumental section. "I Miss You So" was issued as a single by Bluebird Records in May 1940 and featured "Public Jitterbug No. 1" on the B-side. The song reached number 20 on the US Billboard Music Popularity Chart that year and would later be considered a standard in American popular music. In 1999, the group's original version was inducted into the Grammy Hall of Fame.

=== Track listings ===
78" RPM single

- "I Miss You So"
- "Public Jitterbug No. 1"

=== Charts ===
Weekly chart performance for "I Miss You So"
Chart (1940)	Peak position
US Music Popularity Chart (Billboard)	20

== Chris Connor version ==
"I Miss You So"

Single by Chris Connor

from the album I Miss You So
- B-side: "My Heart Is So Full of You"
- Released: August 1956
- Genre: Jazz; pop
- Label: Atlantic
- Songwriters: Jimmie Henderson; John Scott; Sid Robin

Chris Connor singles chronology
"Go Way from My Window" (1956)	"I Miss You So" (1956)	"Time Out for Tears" (1956)

Jazz singer, Chris Connor, recorded a series of singles and albums for Atlantic Records during the 1950s, among them being "I Miss You So". Although signed to the label as an "album artist", according to Billboard, the label pushed some of her singles towards pop radio, among them being "I Miss You So". The cover version was released in August 1956 by Atlantic and featured the B-side, "My Heart Is So Full of You". Cash Box called it an "emotional reading that should meet with the approval of dee jays in the pop and jazz fields." The song originally found little success, but was ultimately played heavily in the US cities of Detroit, Cleveland and Boston. It was one of only two songs in Connor's career to chart, rising to the number 34 position on the US Billboard Hot 100 in 1956. It was later released as the title tune to Connor's studio album of the same name.

=== Track listings ===
45 RPM single

- "I Miss You So"
- "My Heart Is So Full of You"

=== Charts ===
Weekly chart performance for "I Miss You So"
Chart (1956)	Peak position
US Hot 100 (Billboard)	34

== Paul Anka version ==
"I Miss You So"

Single by Paul Anka

from the album My Heart Sings
- B-side: "Late Last Night"
- Released: March 1959
- Genre: Pop
- Length: 2:26
- Label: ABC–Paramount
- Songwriters: Jimmie Henderson; John Scott; Sid Robin

Paul Anka singles chronology
"(All of a Sudden) My Heart Sings" (1958)	"I Miss You So" (1959)	"Lonely Boy" (1959)

"I Miss You So" was subsequently covered by American singer, Paul Anka, in 1959. A teen idol, Anka had a series of pop successes in the late 1950s, with songs like "Put Your Head on My Shoulder" and "Lonely Boy". Anka's version was released as a single by ABC–Paramount in March 1959 and was backed on the B-side by the tune, "Melodie D'Amour". Billboard drew comparisons with Anka's version to his song "My Heart Sings", finding it had a similar style to that recording. The single reached number 33 on the US Hot 100, number 91 on Australia's Kent Music Report chart and number 20 on Canada's CHUM Chart. That year, it was featured on his studio album titled My Heart Sings.

=== Track listings ===
45 RPM single

- "I Miss You So" – 2:26
- "Late Last Night" – 2:02

=== Charts ===
Weekly chart performance for "I Miss You So"
Chart (1959)	Peak position
Australian (Kent Music Report)	91
Canada (CHUM Chart)	20
US Hot 100 (Billboard)	33

== Little Anthony and the Imperials version ==
"I Miss You So"

Single by Little Anthony & the Imperials

from the album Goin' Out of My Head
- B-side: "Get Out of My Life"
- Released: August 1965
- Genre: R&B
- Length: 2:33
- Label: DCP International
- Songwriters: Jimmie Henderson; John Scott; Sid Robin
- Producer: Teddy Randazzo

Little Anthony & the Imperials singles chronology
"Take Me Back" (1965)	"I Miss You So" (1965)	"Hurt" (1965)

American R&B group, Little Anthony & the Imperials, covered "I Miss You So" in 1965. The group blended doo-wop with a soul sound that brought a string of US hits during the 1960s. The group had a reshuffling in 1962 and began working alongside producer Teddy Randazzo where they found success with "I'm on the Outside (Looking In)" and it was followed by "I Miss You So". The track was produced by Randazzo and was released as a single by DCP International in August 1965. Its B-side was the track "Get Out of My Life". The song was included on their album, Goin' Out of My Head, and Allmusic reviewer Andrew Hamilton named the track "an unsung goodie" in its track listing. The group's version of the track reached number 34 on the US Hot 100 and number 23 on the US R&B songs chart. It also climbed to number 10 on Canada's RPM Top Singles chart.

=== Track listings ===
45 RPM single

- "I Miss You So" – 2:33
- "Get Out of My Life" – 2:00

=== Charts ===
Weekly chart performance for "I Miss You So"
Chart (1965)	Peak position
Canada Top Singles (RPM)	10
US Hot 100 (Billboard)	34
US Hot R&B Songs (Billboard)	23
