= List of Minnesota State Fair grandstand shows =

This article lists events at the Minnesota State Fair's Grandstand Building. Each night of the yearly fair, the grandstand hosts an event (typically a concert) which is followed by a fireworks display. These events are ticketed separately from the fair's admission fee. Previous years have featured major national acts such as Duran Duran, Usher, and The Beach Boys. In combination with large concerts and comedy sets, the string of shows contains the final edition of the yearly Minnesota State Fair Amateur Talent Contest.

The grandstand itself was built in 1885 and underwent a major renovation starting in 2002 to modernize the aging structure.

List of events at the Minnesota State Fair's grandstand
Year	Date	Headline act
2017	August 24	Nickelback, Daughtry
2017	August 25	Stevie Nicks, Vanessa Carlton
2017	August 26	Jim Gaffigan
2017	August 27	Toby Keith, 3 Doors Down
2017	August 28	Frankie Valli & The Four Seasons
2017	August 29	John Mellencamp, Carlene Carter
2017	August 30	Pentatonix
2017	August 31	Usher, Black Coffee
2017	September 1	The Minnesota Show with Garrison Keillor
2017	September 2	Phantogram, Lucius, and Now, Now
2017	September 3	Minnesota State Fair Amateur Talent Contest finals
2017	September 4	Sam Hunt, LANCO, and Ryan Follese
2018	August 23	Niall Horan
2018	August 24	Sugarland
2018	August 25	Music On-A-Stick: Trampled By Turtles
2018	August 26	Earth, Wind & Fire
2018	August 27	The Beach Boys
2018	August 28	Jason Mraz
2018	August 29	Old Dominion
2018	August 30	Impractical Jokers
2018	August 31	311 and The Offspring
2018	September 1	Hairball: A Bombastic Celebration of Arena Rock
2018	September 2	Minnesota State Fair Amateur Talent Contest finals
2018	September 3	Boy George, Culture Club, The B-52s
2019	August 22	Barenaked Ladies
2019	August 23	Why Don't We
2019	August 24	Dierks Bentley
2019	August 25	Trace Adkins & Clint Black
2019	August 26	Tommy Games & the Shondells
2019	August 27	Weird Al
2019	August 28	Hall & Oates
2019	August 29	Logic
2019	August 30	Lionel Richie
2019	August 31	Music On-A-Stick: Brandi Carlile
2019	September 1	Minnesota State Fair Amateur Talent Contest finals
2019	September 2	ZZ Top
2020	Fair cancelled due to COVID-19 pandemic	
2021	August 26	Miranda Lambert
2021	August 27	Maren Morris
2021	August 28	Music On-A-Stick: Lake Street Dive
2021	August 29	TLC & Shaggy
2021	August 30	The Spinners
2021	August 31	The Doobie Brothers
2021	September 1	Tim McGraw
2021	September 2	The Chainsmokers
2021	September 3	Kevin Costner + Modern West
2021	September 4	George Thorogood & the Destroyers
2021	September 5	Minnesota State Fair Amateur Talent Contest finals
2021	September 6	Darci Lynne
2022	August 25	Alice in Chains, Breaking Benjamin, and Bush
2022	August 26	Counting Crows
2022	August 27	Portugal. The Man, Manchester Orchestra, and Bad Bad Hats
2022	August 28	Pitbull, Iggy Azalea
2022	August 29	The Beach Boys, The Temptations, and Tower of Power
2022	August 30	Jim Gaffigan
2022	August 31	Florida Georgia Line, Bailey Zimmerman
2022	September 1	REO Speedwagon, Styx, and Levon
2022	September 2	Zac Brown Band, Robert Randolph Band
2022	September 3	Diana Ross, Naturally 7
2022	September 4	Minnesota State Fair Amateur Talent Contest finals
2022	September 5	Free Kids Day Fun Fest (Disney Princess - The Concert cancelled)
2023	August 24	The Black Keys
2023	August 25	The Chicks
2023	August 26	Keith Urban
2023	August 27	Boyz II Men and Chaka Khan
2023	August 28	Happy Together Tour (The Turtles, Little Anthony, Gary Puckett & the Union Gap, The Vogues, The Classics IV, and The Cowsills)
2023	August 29	Brandi Carlile, Wynonna Judd
2023	August 30	Yung Gravy, bbno$
2023	August 31	Duran Duran
2023	September 1	Jonas Brothers
2023	September 2	The Current's Music On-A-Stick (The Hold Steady, Bob Mould, and Dillinger Four)
2023	September 3	Minnesota State Fair Amateur Talent Contest finals
2023	September 4	Blippi: The Wonderful World Tour
2024	August 22	Becky G
2024	August 23	Chance The Rapper
2024	August 24	Nate Bargatze
2024	August 25	Blake Shelton
2024	August 26	Happy Together Tour (The Turtles, Jay and the Americans, The Association, Badfinger, The Vogues, and The Cowsills) (concert cancelled due to stormy weather)
2024	August 27	Ludacris & T-Pain
2024	August 29	Mötley Crüe
2024	August 30	Matchbox Twenty
2024	August 31	Stephen Sanchez
2024	September 1	Minnesota State Fair Amateur Talent Contest finals
2024	September 2	Kidz Bop Live
2025	August 21	Old Dominion
2025	August 22	Meghan Trainor
2025	August 23	Atmosphere, Cypress Hill, Lupe Fiasco, The Pharcyde, and DJ Abilities
2025	August 24	Melissa Etheridge and Indigo Girls
2025	August 25	Happy Together Tour (The Turtles, Jay and the Americans, Little Anthony, Gary Puckett & the Union Gap, The Vogues, and The Cowsills)
2025	August 26	Def Leppard
2025	August 27	Hank Williams Jr. and Marty Stuart & The Fabulous Superlatives
2025	August 28	Darryl Hall and The Rascals
2025	August 29	The Avett Brothers and The Milk Carton Kids
2025	September 1	The Rock and Roll Playhouse and Bri & The Anti-Heroes
