= Rubber Biscuit =

Single by the Chips
- B-side: "Oh My Darlin'"
- Released: 1956
- Recorded: August 3, 1956
- Studio: Belltone Studios, New York City
- Genre: Novelty, doo-wop
- Length: 2:05
- Label: Josie
- Songwriter: Charles Johnson

The Chips singles chronology
"Rubber Biscuit" (1956)	"Darling (I Need Your Love)" (1961)

"Rubber Biscuit" is a novelty doo-wop song performed by the vocals-only team the Chips, who recorded it in 1956. It was covered by the Blues Brothers on their 1978 debut album, Briefcase Full of Blues, among many other artists, as well as being featured in the 1973 film Mean Streets.

== Songwriting ==
"Rubber Biscuit" started life as Charles Johnson's answer to the marching rhythms of the Warwick School for Delinquent Teenagers while he was an intern there. Label credit for writing and composing the song was given to Chips lead singer Charles Johnson. The songwriting credit was expanded in the 1970s to include all of the Chips.

== Lyrics ==
Few of the lyrics can actually be understood, as they are sung in the scat manner. The scat is interrupted every few bars for short one-liners, most of which are implicit references to the singer's poverty and meager diet resulting from same, mentioning such items as a "wish sandwich" (where one has two slices of bread and wishes for meat in between them), a "ricochet biscuit" (which is supposed to bounce off the wall and into one's mouth, and when it does not, "you go hungry"), a "cool-water sandwich," and a "Sunday go-to-meeting bun." In a live performance of the song by the Blues Brothers, Elwood Blues (Dan Aykroyd) explains that these last two items refer, respectively, to eating watermelon and taking an old lady to church. The song closes with the question "What do you want for nothing—a rubber biscuit?"

== Personnel ==
The Chips were teenage friends in New York: Charles Johnson (lead vocal), Nathaniel Epps (baritone), Paul Fulton (bass), Sammy Strain and Shedrick Lincoln (tenors).

Recorded August 3, 1956, at Belltone Studios, New York City.

- Ernie Hayes - piano
- Panama Francis - drums
- Mickey Baker - guitar
- King Curtis - saxophone
- other musicians unidentified

== Performance and aftermath ==
When Josie Records heard the tune they signed the group and the record was issued in September 1956. Although it did not chart, "Rubber Biscuit" became popular on the East Coast, allowing the Chips to tour alongside the Dells, the Cadillacs, and Bo Diddley, but the momentum gained by their debut single was waning and the group broke up at the end of 1957. Sammy Strain went on to success in the music industry, as a member of Little Anthony & the Imperials from about 1961 to 1972, when he left to join the O'Jays. Strain left the O'Jays in 1992 to return to the Imperials, where he remained until his retirement in 2004.

== Blues Brothers cover ==
In 1978, The Blues Brothers recorded a cover of "Rubber Biscuit" on the album Briefcase Full of Blues; this version (with lead vocal by actor-singer Dan Aykroyd) was also released as a single. The single peaked at #37 on the Billboard Hot 100 and #44 in Canada. This led to royalties for the original Chips, and they briefly re-united to record another single and play a few shows.

== In popular culture ==
- "Rubber Biscuit" was used in the Martin Scorsese 1973 film, Mean Streets.
