= Bobby Weinstein =

American singer and songwriter (1939–2022)

- Born: Robert Weinstein; July 16, 1939; Brooklyn, New York City, U.S.
- Died: March 16, 2022 (aged 82)
- Occupations: Songwriter, musician

Robert Weinstein (July 16, 1939 – March 16, 2022) was an American songwriter, singer, and music industry executive, whose hit songs, mostly co-written with Teddy Randazzo, include "Goin' Out of My Head", "It's Gonna Take a Miracle" and "I'm on the Outside (Looking In)".

== Life and career ==
Weinstein was born and grew up in New York City, and attended the School of Industrial Art in Manhattan. While there, he formed a vocal group, The Legends, with fellow students Marshall Samples, Ron Warwell, Richard "Chico" Brunson, Sampson Reese and Dominick Fleres. The group won a talent contest at the Apollo Theater in 1955, and recorded for the small Melba and Hull labels before splitting up. Weinstein's song, "The Legend of Love", was one of those recorded by the group. In 1957, he began writing songs with Teddy Randazzo, who had sung in another vocal group, The Three Chuckles. Their first major hit as co-writers was "Pretty Blue Eyes", recorded by Steve Lawrence and produced by Don Costa, which reached no. 9 on the pop charts at the start of 1960.

Working as part of Costa's production company, Weinstein and Randazzo had some of their biggest successes with comeback hits for Little Anthony and the Imperials in 1964 and 1965, "I'm on the Outside (Looking In)", "Goin' Out of My Head" and "Hurt So Bad", the last of which was also co-written with Bobby Hart. Weinstein and Randazzo also had a hit in 1965 with "It's Gonna Take a Miracle", by The Royalettes. Although he mostly wrote with Randazzo, Weinstein also both worked and performed with Hart and his regular collaborator, Tommy Boyce. During the 1960s, he sang, with Boyce, Hart, Kenny Rankin and others, in Randazzo's revue band, performing regular engagements in Las Vegas and elsewhere. His songs have been recorded by such musicians as The Box Tops, Dionne Warwick, Frankie Valli and The Four Seasons, Ella Fitzgerald, Linda Ronstadt and Frank Sinatra. He occasionally used the writing pseudonym Robert Wilding.

Weinstein later became an executive with the performing rights organization Broadcast Music Inc. (BMI). He also served for 24 years on the board of the National Academy of Popular Music (NAPM), responsible for the Songwriters Hall of Fame, becoming its president between 1993 and 1999. He was inducted to the Hall of Fame, with Randazzo, in 2007.

He died on March 16, 2022, at the age of 82.
