= The Royalettes discography =

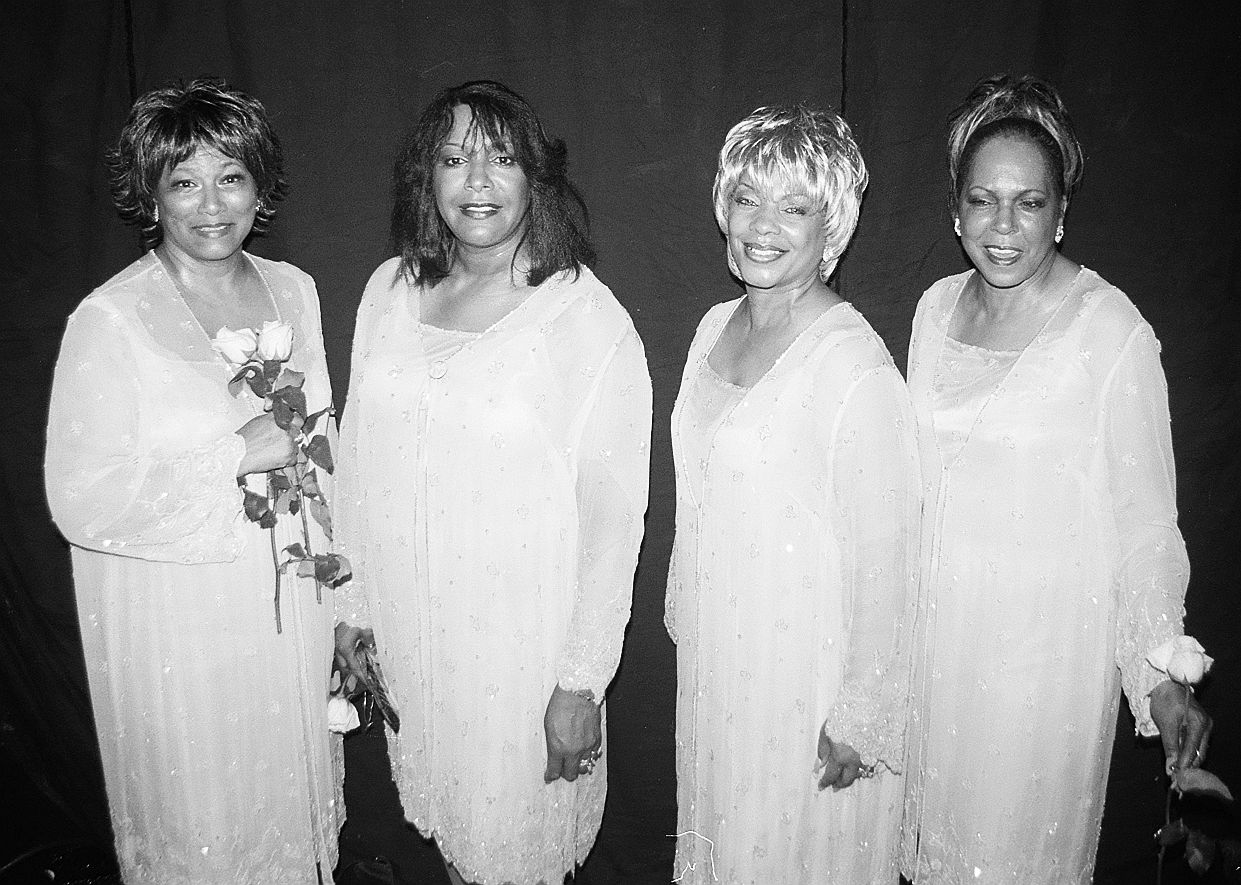
- The group in 2002
- Studio albums: 2
- Compilation albums: 2
- Singles: 13
- Promotional singles: 1
- Other charted songs: 1

This is the discography of American R&B girl group The Royalettes. It contains 2 studio albums, 2 compilation albums, 13 singles and other charted songs. Their debut single was 1963's "No Big Thing", released on Chancellor Records. It was followed by "Willie The Wolf", which didn't chart, but the flip "Blue Summer" reached the pop charts.

The group left the label and later moved to MGM Records, for whom they recorded a string of successful pop and R&B singles. "Poor Boy" was their second minor hit, stalling at No. 113 nationally. The following release produced by Teddy Randazzo became their biggest hit. "It's Gonna Take a Miracle" hit the top-40 on the Cashbox Top 100 Singles and the top-30 on the Billboard Hot Rhythm & Blues Singles charts. The next release produced by Raddazzo was a hit as well, reaching even higher positions on the R&B charts.

Subsequently, the album It's Gonna Take a Miracle was released by MGM. It consisted of four previous single releases and newly recorded songs. Their next release was "You Bring Me Down," which was their final pop hit, almost breaking into the main Pop 100 charts. In 1966, the album The Elegant Sound of The Royalettes was released by the label as well, featuring only two lower-profile singles. The group left MGM by 1967, switching to Roulette Records for "River of Tears", but the single missed the charts and was their final release.

== Albums ==
=== Studio albums ===
List of studio albums, showing all relevant details
Title	Album details
It's Gonna Take a Miracle	Released: 1965; Label: MGM; Formats: LP, vinyl
The Elegant Sound of The Royalettes	Released: 1966; Label: MGM; Formats: LP, vinyl

=== Compilation albums ===
List of compilation albums, showing all relevant details
Title	Album details
The MGM Sides	Released: 1996; Label: Ichiban; Formats: CD, compilation
It's Gonna Take A Miracle: The Complete MGM Recordings - The Royalettes	Released: September 17, 2010; Label: RPM; Formats: CD, compilation

== Singles ==
List of singles, with selected chart positions, showing other relevant details
Single	Year	Chart positions			Album
Single	Year	US BB	US CB	US R&B	Album
"No Big Thing" "Yesterday's Lovers"	1963	— —	— —	— —	Non-LP tracks
"Willie The Wolf" "Blue Summer"	1963	— 121	— —	— —	Non-LP tracks
"Come To Me" "There He Goes"	1964	— —	— —	— —	Non-LP tracks
"He's Gone" "Don't You Cry"	1964	— —	— —	— —	It's Gonna Take a Miracle
"Poor Boy" "Watch What Happens"	1965	113 —	— —	— —	It's Gonna Take a Miracle
"It's Gonna Take a Miracle" "Out Of Sight, Out Of Mind"	1965	41 —	37 —	28 —	It's Gonna Take a Miracle
"I Want to Meet Him" "Never Again"	1965	72 —	78 —	26 —	It's Gonna Take a Miracle
"You Bring Me Down" "Only When You're Lonely"	1966	116 —	101 —	— —	Non-LP tracks
"It's a Big Mistake" "It's Better Not To Know"	1966	— —	— —	— —	The Elegant Sound of The Royalettes
"An Affair to Remember (Our Love Affair)" "I Don't Want to Be the One"	1966	— —	— —	— —	The Elegant Sound of The Royalettes
"When Summer's Gone" "Love Without an End"	1966	— —	124 —	— —	Non-LP tracks
"Take My Love (And Hide It From My Heart)" "(He Is) My Man"	1966	— —	— —	— —	Non-LP tracks
"River of Tears" "Something Wonderful"	1967	— —	— —	— —	Non-LP tracks

== Promotional singles ==
List of promotional singles, showing all relevant details
Title	Year	Album	Ref.
"When Summer's Gone"	1966	Non-LP tracks	
