= Gourdine =

Gourdine is a surname. Notable people with the surname include:

- Jerome Gourdine (born 1941), known professionally as Little Anthony, American singer and member of Little Anthony and the Imperials
- Meredith Gourdine (1929–1998), American long jumper, engineer, and physicist
