= Cats and the Fiddle =

African-American singing group (1937–1951)

- Cats and the Fiddle, 1946

Background information
- Origin: Chicago, Illinois, U.S.
- Genre: Jazz
- Years active: 1937–1951
- Labels: Bluebird; Montgomery Ward; Regis; Manor; RCA Victor; Gotham; ARCO; Decca
- Past members: Jimmy Henderson; Ernie Price; Chuck Barksdale; Austin Powell; Herbie Mills; Lloyd "Tiny" Grimes; George Stienbeck; Mifflin "Pee Wee" Branford; Hank Haslett; Emmitt Slay; Johnny Davis; Stanley Gaines; Shirley Moore; Doris Knighton

The Cats and the Fiddle was an African-American singing group formed in 1937 in Chicago and active until 1951, releasing over 30 gramophone sides during the period. Their instrumentation included a bass (the "fiddle" of the title), tenor guitar, ukulele, and Martin-brand tiple, a 10-string ukulele-family instrument.

Their signature song, "I Miss You So", has been covered by many musicians.

== Members ==
Over the course of its activity, the Cats and the Fiddle experienced a large change in personnel. Below is a list of every person who was a member at some point.

- Jimmy Henderson – first tenor
- Ernie Price – second tenor
- Chuck Barksdale – bass
- Austin Powell – lead singer, tenor guitar
- Herbie Mills – lead singer
- Lloyd "Tiny" Grimes – first tenor, tenor (four-string) guitar
- George Stienbeck – bass
- Mifflin "Pee Wee" Branford – first tenor
- Hank Haslett – lead singer
- Emmitt Slay – first tenor
- Johnny Davis – first tenor
- Stanley Gaines – bass
- Shirley Moore – singer
- Doris Knighton – singer

== Musical career ==
The original members consisted of Jimmy Henderson (first tenor), Ernie Price (second tenor), Chuck Barksdale (bass), and Austin Powell (lead singer). They were first discovered in 1939, when they were spotted by Lester Melrose, a representative for Victor Records, while performing in Chicago. They were signed to Bluebird Records and released their first single, "Nuts to You" b/w "Killin' Jive", in August of that year. They had also been featured in the film Going Places the previous year, singing "Jeepers Creepers" with Louis Armstrong.

In 1940, their first real hit came with the song "I Miss You So", a mid-tempo ballad penned by Jimmy Henderson, John Scott, and Sid Robin, which was later redone by the Orioles at a slower tempo. Henderson soon died from meningitis and was replaced briefly by Herbie Mills (a former member of the Harlem Harmony Hounds along with Austin Powell) in July 1940, who was then replaced by Tiny Grimes in January 1941. Shortly after, tragedy struck again, and Chuck Barksdale died and was replaced by George Stienbeck.

"I Miss You So" eventually became their best known song; it has been covered by many, including Paul Anka (1959 single release), Little Anthony and the Imperials (1965 single release), Charles Brown, Barry Young, the Nat King Cole Trio, Tony Scotti, Earl Grant, Julie London (on Love Letters), Connie Francis, Diana Krall (on Love Scenes), Jermaine Jackson, Kay Starr (on Losers, Weepers), Mel Carter, Charlie Rich, Mickey Gilley, Chris Connor, Etta Jones (on Lonely and Blue), and the Mills Brothers.

In 1942, Grimes left the group and was replaced by Mifflin "Pee Wee" Branford as first tenor. They did not record in 1942 but continued to make appearance for the next two years, even after Austin Powell was drafted in 1943. While in the service, Powell was replaced by Hank Haslett briefly before Herbie Mills returned to the group. The lack of recordings may also be due to the 1942–1944 musicians' union strike.

In 1944, the Regis/Manor group of labels signed the Cats and the Fiddle, where they re-recorded "I Miss You So" led by Ernie Price. Powell then returned in 1946 to lead the group in "That's My Desire", which was later redone by the Channels in 1957. In 1947, Mifflin Branford was replaced by Emmitt Slay briefly, until Johnny Davis took over as first tenor permanently. In 1948, a fifth member, Shirley Moore, was added to the group. Moore recorded four tracks with the group before being replaced by Doris Knighton.

In 1950, the Cats and the Fiddle recorded "I'll Never, Never Let You Go" with Gotham Records and "Wine Drinker" with Decca Records. They disbanded in 1951 and Powell subsequently formed the Austin Powell Quintet, which consisted of former Cats and the Fiddle members Johnny Davis, Stanley Gaines (bass), and Doris Knighton, as well as Beryl Booker and Dottie Smith. They recorded two singles, "Some Other Spring" b/w "All This Can't Be True" and "Wishing Well" b/w "Please Consider Me", with Decca before disbanding around a year later.

== Discography ==
=== Bluebird Records ===
- 1939-08: "Nuts to You" / "Killin' Jive" (8216)
- 1939-09: "Gang Busters" / "Please Don't Leave Me Now" (8248)
- 1939-11: "Killer Diller Man from the South" / "Thursday Evening Swing" (10484)
- 1939-12: "We Cats Will Swing for You" / Till the Day I Die" (10547)
- 1940-04: "Chant of the Rain" / "I'd Rather Drink Muddy Water" (8402)
- 1940-05: "I Miss You So" / "Public Jitterbug No. 1" (8429)
- 1940-05: "When I Grow Too Old to Dream" / "Left with the Thought of You" (8443)
- 1940-06: "Mister Rhythm Man" / "Gone" (8465)
- 1940-08: "That's On, Jack, That's On" / "Just a Roamer" (8489)
- 1940-09: "Hep Cats Holiday" / "In the Midst of a Dream" (8519)
- 1940-10: "Nothing" / "That's All I Mean to You" (8535)
- 1940-11: "You're So Fine" / "Pig's Idea" (8560)
- 1940-12: "Hush-A-Bye Love" / "Swing the Scales" (8585)
- 1941-02: "I'll Always Love You Just the Same" / "One Is Never Too Old to Swing" (8639)
- 1941-04: "If I Dream of You" / "I'm Gonna Pull My Hair" (8665)
- 1941-05: "I'm Singing (So Help Me)" / "My Darling" (8685)
- 1941-05: "Crawlin' Blues" / "Until I Met You" (8705)
- 1941-11: "I Don't Want to Set the World on Fire" / "Blue Skies" (8847)
- 1941-12: "Lawdy-Clawdy" / "Sighing and Crying" (8870)
- 1941-01: "Another Day" / "Stomp Stomp" (8902)
- 1942-02: "Part of Me" / "Life's Too Short" (8932)

=== Montgomery Ward ===
(Bluebird masters, leased from Victor)

- 1940: "Killer Diller Man from the South" / "Thursday Evening Swing" (8519)
- 1940: "We Cats Will Swing for You" / "Till the Day I Die" (8520)
- 1940: "Chant of the Rain" / "I'd Rather Drink Muddy Water" (8521)
- 1940: "I Miss You So" / "Public Jitterbug No. 1" (8767)
- 1940: "When I Grow Too Old to Dream" / "Left with the Thought of You" (8768)
- 1940: "Mister Rhythm Man" / "Gone" (8769)
- 1940: "That's On, Jack, That's On" / "Just a Roamer" (8770)
- 1941: "You're So Fine" / "Pig's Idea" (8904)
- 1941: "Hush-A-Bye Love" / "Swing the Scales" (8905)

=== Regis ===
(Subsidiary of Manor Records)

- 1946-02: "I Miss You So" / "My Sugar's Sweet to Me" (6000)

=== Manor Records ===
- 1946-06: "Life's Too Short" / "Romance Without Finance" (1023)
- 1946-08: "Please Don't Leave Me Now" / "Shorty's Got to Go" (1037)
- 1946-08: "J. D. Blues" / "Gin Misery Blues" (1038) – backing June Davis
- 1946-12: "I'd Rather Drink Muddy Water" / "Walkie Talkie" (1045) – B-side by Rudy Richardson Trio
- 1947-03: "That's My Desire" / "When Elephants Roost in Bamboo Trees" (1064)
- 1947-03: "They Don't Understand" /" I'm Stuck with You" (1067)
- 1947-07: "Where Are You" / "I'm Gonna Pull My Hair" (1078)
- 1947-08: "You're So Fine" / "Darling Can't We Make a Date" (1086)
- c. mid-1947: "I Miss You So" / "My Sugar's Sweet to Me" (6000)
- 1948-02: "Honey Honey Honey" / "I'm Afraid of You" (1112)
- 1948-09: "That's What I Thought You Said" / "The New Look Blues" (1140)

=== RCA Victor ===
(Bluebird reissues)

- 1946-12: "I Miss You So" / "Dig These Blues" (20-2072) – B-side by the 4 Clefs
- 1948-01: "Gang Busters" / "Please Don't Leave Me Now" (20-2794)
- 1948-01: "Chant of the Rain" / "I'd Rather Drink Muddy Water" (20-2795)
- 1948-12: "If I Dream of You" / "I'm Gonna Pull My Hair" (20-3260)
- 1950: "I Miss You So" / "Dig These Blues" (50-0077) – B-side by the 4 Clefs
- 1950-11: "I Miss You So" / "Another Day" (47-4393)
- 1955: "I Miss You So" / "Dig These Blues" (447-0077) – B-side by the 4 Clefs

=== Gotham Records ===
- 1949-09: "I'll Never, Never Let You Go" / "Start Talking, Baby" (197)
- 1950-04: "Do You Love Me" / "Movin' Out Today" (239)

=== ARCO Records ===
(Manor reissues)

- 1265 I Miss You So/My Sugar's Sweet To Me - 1950

=== Decca Records ===
- 1950-05: "Wine Drinker" / "Lover Boy" (48151)
- 1951-04: "Some Other Spring" / "All This Can't Be True" (48206) – as the Austin Powell Quintet
- 1951-09: "Wishing Well" / "Please Consider Me" (48251) – as the Austin Powell Quintet
