= The Chips =

The Chips were a short-lived New York City doo-wop vocal group consisting of teenage friends Charles Johnson (lead vocal), Nathaniel Epps (baritone), Paul Fulton (bass), Sammy Strain and Shedrick Lincoln (tenors). The group's first recording is their most enduring; "Rubber Biscuit" started life as Johnson's answer to the marching rhythms of the Warwick School for Delinquent Teenagers while he was an intern there.

When Josie Records heard the tune they signed the group and the record was issued in September 1956. Although it did not chart, "Rubber Biscuit" became an instant east coast radio favourite, and saw its performers touring alongside The Dells, Cadillacs, and Bo Diddley, but the momentum gained by their debut single was waning and the group broke up at the end of 1957. Only Sammy Strain went on to success in the music industry, as a member of Little Anthony & The Imperials from about 1961 to 1972 when he left to join The O'Jays. Strain left the O'Jays in 1992 to return to The Imperials, where he remained until his retirement in 2004. Shedrick died in 1988.

"Rubber Biscuit" was resurrected in 1973 in Martin Scorsese's film Mean Streets, about small-time gangsters. In 1978, The Blues Brothers recorded a cover of "Rubber Biscuit" on the album Briefcase Full of Blues; this version was released as a single that peaked at #37 on the Billboard Hot 100 and #44 in Canada. "Rubber Biscuit" is also heard in the 1990 John Waters film Cry-Baby, the soundtrack to the film Super Size Me, and was the theme music to the 2009 BBC television show Jimmy's Food Factory.
