= It's Gonna Take a Miracle =

1965 single by the Royalettes

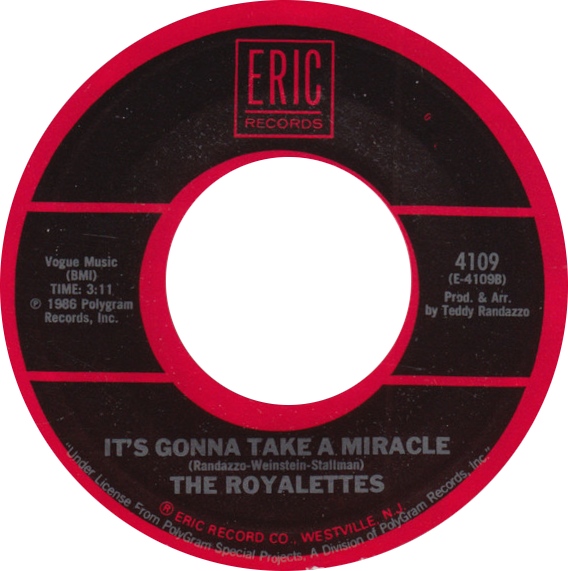
- 1986 US reissue single of the Royalettes recording

Single by The Royalettes
- B-side: "Out of Sight, Out of Mind"
- Released: July 1965
- Genre: R&B
- Label: MGM Records
- Songwriters: Teddy Randazzo; Bobby Weinstein; Lou Stallman
- Producer: Teddy Randazzo

The Royalettes singles chronology
"Poor Boy" (1965)	"It's Gonna Take a Miracle" (1965)	"I Want to Meet Him" (1965)

"It's Gonna Take a Miracle"
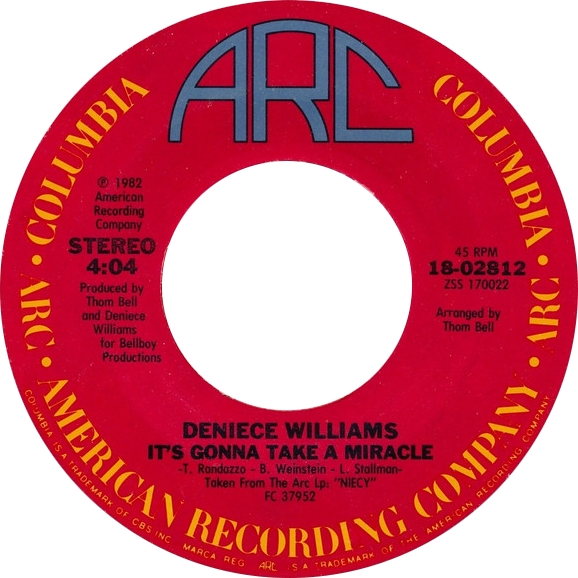
- US single of Deniece Williams recording

Single by Deniece Williams

from the album Niecy
- B-side: "A Part of Love"
- Released: March 1982
- Recorded: 1981
- Studio: Sigma Sound, Philadelphia, Pennsylvania
- Genre: R&B
- Length: 4:09
- Label: ARC/Columbia
- Songwriters: Teddy Randazzo; Bobby Weinstein; Lou Stallman
- Producers: Deniece Williams, Thom Bell

Deniece Williams singles chronology
"Silly" (1981)	"It's Gonna Take a Miracle" (1982)	"Love Won't Let Me Wait" (1984)

"It's Gonna Take a Miracle" is a song written by Teddy Randazzo, Bobby Weinstein, and Lou Stallman. It was first an R&B hit in 1965 for The Royalettes, which reached the Top 30 on the U.S. R&B chart and peaked at number 41 on the Billboard Hot 100 and number 37 on Cash Box.

The most successful version of "It's Gonna Take a Miracle" was the 1982 cover by R&B and gospel singer Deniece Williams. Her version went to number 1 on the R&B chart for two weeks and reached number 10 on the Billboard Hot 100.

The song was originally written and intended for Little Anthony and The Imperials, but they never recorded it due to a royalty dispute with the song's writers/label owners Teddy Randazzo and Don Costa at the group's record label, DCP (Don Costa Productions) Records. Imperials member (and Double Rock and Roll Hall of Fame Inductee) Sammy Strain recalls:

"We had a lot of hit records (with DCP) but we hadn’t received any royalties,” said Strain. “We protested and said we’re not going into the studio anymore until we get an accounting. We didn’t record for about eight or nine months. In the interim, Teddy Randazzo produced a girl group out of Baltimore called the Royalettes. He gave them a song called 'It’s Gonna Take a Miracle' which was written for Little Anthony & the Imperials. When it first came out, everybody thought it was us. He also produced Derek Martin who had a hit called 'You Better Go.' But we missed a million seller with 'Gonna Take a Miracle' when we went on strike with the record company."

== Charts ==
Original by The Royalettes
Chart (1965)	Peak position
US Billboard Hot 100	41
US Billboard R&B	28
US Cashbox Top 100 Singles	37

=== Weekly charts ===
Chart (1982)	Peak position
Canada RPM Top Singles	41
New Zealand (RIANZ)	9
US Billboard Hot 100	10
US Billboard Adult Contemporary	6
US Billboard R&B	1
US Cash Box Top 100	16

=== Year-end charts ===
Chart (1982)	Rank
US Billboard Hot 100	71

== Other cover versions ==
- In 1970, Alton Ellis for his album Sunday Coming.
- In 1971, Laura Nyro included it on her covers album with LaBelle, Gonna Take a Miracle. Nyro's recording featured in the film "A Home at the End of the World" (2004).
- Also in 1971, the Philadelphia-based female quartet Honey & The Bees attained R&B chart success with their cover of the hit song, recorded as part of a medley with portions of two Little Anthony hits, Hurts So Bad and Going Out Of My Head.
- In 1994, The Manhattan Transfer recorded it with Bette Midler on lead vocals. This was released in 1995 on Manhattan Transfer's Tonin'.
