= Better Use Your Head =

Single by Little Anthony & The Imperials
- B-side: "Gonna Fix You Good"
- Released: 1976
- Genre: Modern soul, funk
- Length: 2:49
- Label: Silver Spotlight Series UP 36141
- Songwriters: Teddy Randazzo, Victoria Pike
- Producer: Teddy Randazzo

"Better Use Your Head" is a song and single by American R&B group, Little Anthony & The Imperials written by Teddy Randazzo, who also produced it, and his wife Victoria Pike.

== Credits: The Imperials ==
- "Little Anthony" Gourdine (lead)
- Clarence "Wah-Hoo" Collins (baritone/bass)
- Ernest Wright (2nd tenor)
- Sammy Strain (1st tenor)

== Other credits ==
- Producer: Teddy Randazzo
- Orchestra: Don Costa

== Chart performance ==
"Better Use Your Head", was originally released in the US on the Veep label in 1966 with "The Wonder of It All" as the B-side, it reached No. 54 on the Billboard Hot 100. It was later re-released in 1976 following its gain in popularity after having been played in clubs on the Northern soul scene in the UK. It made No. 42 in the UK charts in July 1976 and was Little Anthony & The Imperials only UK chart success.
