= Take Me Back (Imperials song) =

Single by Little Anthony & The Imperials

from the album Goin’ Out of My Head
- B-side: "Our Song"
- Released: June 1, 1965
- Recorded: 1964
- Genre: Soul, pop
- Length: 3:07
- Label: DCP
- Songwriter: Teddy Randazzo
- Producer: Teddy Randazzo

Little Anthony & The Imperials singles chronology
"Hurt So Bad" (1964)	"Take Me Back" (1965)	"I Miss You So" (1965)

"Take Me Back" was a song composed by songwriter Teddy Randazzo, and was a 1965 hit song by Little Anthony and the Imperials.

== Background ==
"Take Me Back" is a ballad about a plea for forgiveness. The song was one of 5 hit singles taken from their 1964 hit album, Goin' Out of My Head, who also wrote several previous Imperials hit singles, including Goin' Out Of My Head and Hurt So Bad, and was produced by Randazzo and Don Costa for Randazzo's DCP Records label in 1964, released as a single in 1965, and later re-released in 1966 on United Artists' Veep Records subsidiary. Take Me Back was a Billboard Top 20 hit for The Imperials, reaching # 16 on the Billboard Hot 100, and a Top 20 R&B hit as well, peaking at # 15.

== Personnel ==
=== The Imperials ===
- "Little Anthony" Gourdine - Lead Vocals
- Sammy Strain - First Tenor
- Ernest Wright - Second Tenor
- Clarence Collins - Baritone/Bass

=== Producers ===
Teddy Randazzo & Don Costa

== Chart performance ==
It was a Billboard Top 20 Pop Hit, peaking at #16, and was a Top 20 R&B Hit as well, peaking at # 15.
