= The Royalettes =

Baltimore soul girl group

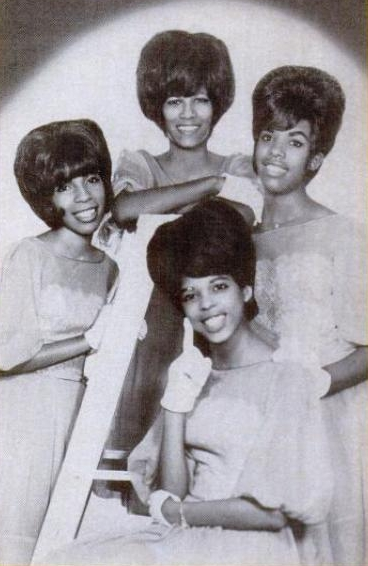
- The Royalettes, 1965.

Background information
- Origin: Baltimore, Maryland
- Genre: Soul
- Labels: Chancellor Records; Warner Bros. Records; MGM Records; Roulette Records
- Past members: Sheila Ross; Veronica Brown; Anita Ross; Terry Jones

The Royalettes (also credited as Sheila Ross and her Royalettes) were a four-girl group from Baltimore, Maryland, who exemplified the "sweet soul" style of the mid-60s.

They were originally signed with Philadelphia-based Chancellor Records and later with Warner Bros. Records, but their biggest success came at MGM Records. They were associated with producers Teddy Randazzo, writer-producer for Little Anthony & The Imperials in the 1960s, and Bill Medley of The Righteous Brothers.

== Origin of group ==
The two Ross sisters formed their musical group while attending high school in Baltimore. They practiced after class with their cousin, Veronica Brown, and friend, Terry Jones. When they began performing together in 1962, the group took its name from the Royal, a theater located in the 1300 block of Pennsylvania Avenue in Baltimore. Built in 1921, the theater was razed in 1970.

== Career ==
The Royalettes' biggest hit was "It's Gonna Take a Miracle" in 1965, charting at #41 on the Billboard Hot 100 and #28 on the Billboard R&B chart. The song has since had more success as a cover, first by Laura Nyro in 1971 and later by Deniece Williams in 1982 who charted in the Top 10 and reached the #1 spot in the R&B chart.

The Royalettes had another hit in 1965 with "I Want to Meet Him" (#72 Hot 100, #26 R&B). MGM released two albums by the group, produced by Teddy Randazzo who also arranged the records and co-wrote most of the songs. Randazzo gave the group a big production sound with a full orchestra, but despite the overall quality of the tracks and critical acclaim for their live performances, a major success eluded the group. A final single produced by Bill Medley also failed to chart and the group moved on to Roulette Records in 1967, where they made one single, before breaking up two years later. Afterward, Sheila worked briefly as a backup singer for The Three Degrees and had two solo single releases in the early 1970s.

A CD retrospective was released in late 2010 of all their MGM tracks including the 27 songs produced by Randazzo for the two albums plus another three originally released on a single.

== Reunion in Baltimore ==
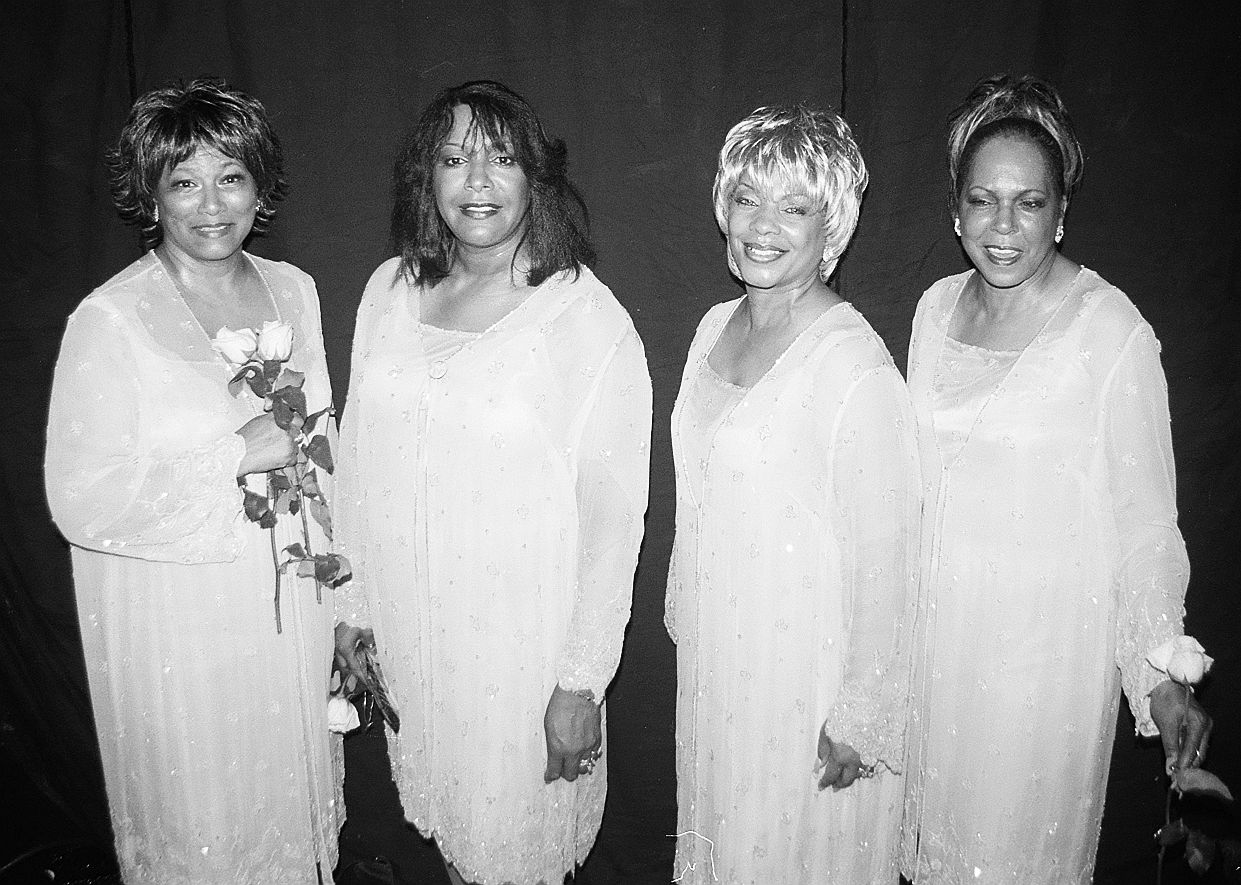
The Royalettes reunion

More than 30 years after the group disbanded, they came together again in 2003 for an All-Star Classic Reunion performance at the 5th Regiment Armory in Baltimore. This was their last performance as a group.

== Discography ==
The list below shows the group's studio albums and compilation albums only. Their full discography, singles, and other releases are described in a separate article.

- It's Gonna Take a Miracle (1965, MGM)
- The Elegant Sound of The Royalettes (1966, MGM)
- The MGM Sides (1996, Ichiban)
- It's Gonna Take A Miracle: The Complete MGM Recordings - The Royalettes (2010, RPM)
