= Briefcase Full of Blues =

Live album by the Blues Brothers
- Released: November 28, 1978
- Recorded: September 9, 1978
- Venues: Universal Amphitheatre, Los Angeles
- Genres: R&B; jump blues
- Length: 35:45
- Label: Atlantic
- Producer: Bob Tischler

The Blues Brothers chronology
Briefcase Full of Blues (1978)	The Blues Brothers: Music from the Soundtrack (1980)

Professional ratings
Review scores
Source	Rating
AllMusic	4/5 stars
Christgau's Record Guide	C+
Music Week	3/4 stars
Rolling Stone	(favorable)

Briefcase Full of Blues is the debut album by the Blues Brothers, released on 28 November 1978, by Atlantic Records. It was recorded live on 9 September 1978, at the Universal Amphitheatre in Los Angeles, when the band opened for comedian Steve Martin. The album consists of covers of blues and soul songs from the 1950s to 1970s.

The album hit number 1 on the Billboard album chart and sold over two million US copies, going double platinum; according to Blues Brothers member Dan Aykroyd, the album has sold 3.5 million copies in total. It is among the highest-selling blues albums of all time.

Three singles were released from the album: "Rubber Biscuit", which reached number 37 on the Billboard Hot 100, "Soul Man", which reached number 14, and "Hey Bartender", which did not chart.

The album is dedicated to Curtis Salgado, the inspiration behind John Belushi's creation of the Blues Brothers characters.

== Track listing ==
No.	Title	Writer(s)	Original Artist	Length
1.	"Opening: I Can't Turn You Loose"	Otis Redding	Otis Redding (1965)	1:50
2.	"Hey Bartender"	Dossie Terry	Floyd Dixon (1955)	3:01
3.	"Messin' With The Kid"	Mel London	Junior Wells (1960)	3:35
4.	"(I Got Everything I Need) Almost"	Don Walsh	Downchild Blues Band (1973)	2:50
5.	"Rubber Biscuit"	Charles Johnson	The Chips (1956)	2:57
6.	"Shot Gun Blues"	Don Walsh	Downchild Blues Band (1973)	5:23
7.	"Groove Me"	King Floyd	King Floyd (1970)	3:46
8.	"I Don't Know"	Willie Mabon	Willie Mabon and His Combo (1952)	4:14
9.	"Soul Man"	Isaac Hayes; David Porter	Sam & Dave (1967)	3:28
10.	"'B' Movie Box Car Blues"	Delbert McClinton	Delbert & Glen (1972)	4:08
11.	"Flip, Flop and Fly"	Jesse Stone; Big Joe Turner	Big Joe Turner (1955)	3:38
12.	"Closing: I Can't Turn You Loose"	Otis Redding	Otis Redding	0:51
Total length:				39:41

== Personnel ==
Partial credits from Richard Buskin and the album's liner notes.

- "Joliet" Jake Blues (John Belushi) – lead vocals
- Elwood Blues (Dan Aykroyd) – backing vocals, harmonica, lead vocals on "Rubber Biscuit"
- Paul "The Shiv" Shaffer – backing vocals, Hammond organ, Wurlitzer electric piano, acoustic piano, musical director
- Steve "The Colonel" Cropper – guitar
- Matt "Guitar" Murphy – guitar
- Donald "Duck" Dunn – bass guitar
- Steve "Getdwa" Jordan – backing vocals, drums
- Lou "Blue Lou" Marini – tenor and alto saxophones, backing vocals
- Alan "Mr. Fabulous" Rubin – trumpet, backing vocals
- Tom "Triple Scale" Scott – tenor and alto saxophones, backing vocals
- Tom "Bones" Malone – tenor and baritone saxophones, trombone, trumpet, backing vocals, horn arrangements

Production and technical staff

- Bob Tischler - producer, mix engineer
- Belinda Tischler - "assistant to the producer"
- Laila Nabulsi - production coordinator
- Warren Dewey - engineer
- Jay Krugman - assistant engineer
- Frank Sheiback, Bruce Spillman - crew
- David Alexander - album photography
- Judith Jacklin - "design and photo coloring"

Venues

- "Recorded live at the Universal Amphitheater, L.A."
- "Record Plant, L.A." - remote recording, mixing location

== Charts ==
=== Weekly charts ===
Chart (1979)	Peak position
Canada Top Albums/CDs (RPM)	4
New Zealand Albums (RMNZ)	24
Norwegian Albums (VG-lista)	16
US Billboard 200	1

=== Year-end charts ===
Chart (1979)	Position
Canada Top Albums/CDs (RPM)	19
US Billboard 200	43

=== Singles ===
Title	Date	Chart	Peak position
"Soul Man"	February 16, 1979	US Billboard Hot 100	14
"Rubber Biscuit"	April 6, 1979	US Billboard Hot 100	37

== Certifications ==
Region	Certification	Certified units/sales
Canada (Music Canada)	Platinum	100,000^{^}
United Kingdom (BPI)	Gold	100,000^{^}
United States (RIAA)	2× Platinum	2,000,000^{^}
^{^} Shipments figures based on certification alone.
