= I'm on the Outside (Looking In) =

Single by Little Anthony & the Imperials

from the album I'm on the Outside (Looking In)
- B-side: "Please Go"
- Released: 1964
- Recorded: 1964
- Genre: Soul, pop
- Length: 3:07
- Label: DCP
- Songwriters: Teddy Randazzo, Bobby Weinstein
- Producers: Teddy Randazzo, Don Costa

Little Anthony & the Imperials singles chronology
"That Lil' Ole Lovemaker Me" (1961)	"I'm on the Outside (Looking In)" (1964)	"Goin' Out of My Head" (1964)

"I'm on the Outside (Looking In)" is a 1964 hit song by Little Anthony and the Imperials, issued on DCP Records. It was a Billboard top 20 pop hit, peaking at number 15, and number 12 in Canada.

== Background ==
"I'm on the Outside (Looking In)" was written by Teddy Randazzo and Bobby Weinstein, and was the group's comeback single, ending a long period of inactivity. After the group's first hit-making period, with such hits as "Tears on My Pillow", "Two People In The World", and "Shimmy Shimmy Ko-Ko Bop", lead singer "Little Anthony" Gourdine left the group for a solo career. During this time, both Gourdine and the group released records separately, but none of them were hits. By 1963, both entities had faded from the charts. In the interim, The Imperials had gone through some membership changes as well. While original members Ernest Wright and group founder Clarence Collins had remained with the group, the other original members, Tracy Lord and Nathanial Rogers, left the group, while Sammy Strain joined the group.

In late 1963, writer and producer Teddy Randazzo—a childhood friend of some of the group members and now a songwriter for Don Costa Productions—contacted the group, saying that he had written a song that he wanted them to record, and from that point on, things began to change for The Imperials. Gourdine, Wright, Collins, and Strain went to the studio and recorded "I'm On The Outside (Looking In)". With the help of New York disk jockey Murray the K, the song became an immediate hit and re-established The Imperials as a hitmaking force. This song was the first of a long string of hits between Randazzo and the group, which helped them transcend their status as a teen doo-wop group and established them as successful in the adult contemporary radio format.

Gourdine, Wright, Collins, and Strain reunited in 2003 and performed the song 39 years after they originally recorded it on the PBS special: Soul Spectacular: 40 Years of R&B.

== Credits: The Imperials ==
- "Little Anthony" Gourdine
- Clarence "Wah-hoo" Collins
- Sammy Strain
- Ernest Wright
- Producers: Teddy Randazzo and Don Costa

== Cover versions ==
Among the cover versions that were recorded:

- The Miracles, on 1967's Make It Happen.
- Johnny Mathis, in 1972 during the Song Sung Blue sessions, unreleased until the album's 2017 reissue as a bonus track, and again on 1988's Once in a While.
- Baby Washington, on 1968's With You in Mind LP.
- The Moments
- Amy Winehouse sang this song during her five dates in Brazil in 2011.

== Sources ==
- When Rock Was Young, pp. 178–181
