= Murray The K – It's What's Happening, Baby =

- Country of origin: United States

Original release
- Network: CBS
- Release: June 28, 1965

Murray the K – It's What's Happening, Baby was a television special aired on CBS-TV on June 28, 1965 and hosted by Murray the K. The special featured performances by many of the popular artists of the day such as Jan and Dean, Mary Wells, the Dave Clark Five, Gary Lewis and the Playboys, the Supremes, Patti LaBelle and the Bluebelles, the Drifters, the Miracles, Ray Charles, Marvin Gaye, the Ronettes, Chuck Jackson, the Four Tops, the Temptations, the Righteous Brothers and Little Anthony and the Imperials. The music was occasionally interspersed with Murray the K's public announcements urging American youth to pursue education and summer employment (the show was coproduced by the U.S. Office of Economic Opportunity).

The show opened with a performance of "Nowhere to Run" by Martha and the Vandellas, filmed at a Mustang assembly line at the Ford River Rouge Plant in Detroit.

Fred Gwynne makes a guest appearance as Herman Munster, his character from CBS's The Munsters, as Cannibal & the Headhunters mime their hit "Land Of 1000 Dances".

An illegal bootleg version was released by Lady Goose Productions in 2007 as a DVD titled Murray the K & His 1965 Show of Shows. An official DVD release of the restored program, with more than an hour of new interviews with the performers, was issued by TJL Productions in March 2021; however, it lacks Murray the K's public-announcement segments.

== Performances ==
- Martha and the Vandellas: "Nowhere to Run"
- Dionne Warwick: "Walk On By"
- Herman’s Hermits: "Mrs. Brown, You've Got a Lovely Daughter"
- Marvin Gaye: "Pride and Joy"
- Cannibal & the Headhunters: "Land of 1000 Dances"
- Patti LaBelle and the Bluebelles: "You'll Never Walk Alone"
- Little Anthony and the Imperials: "I'm Alright"
- The Ronettes: "Be My Baby"
- Chuck Jackson: "I Don't Want to Cry"
- Mary Wells: "My Guy"
- Johnny Rivers: "The Seventh Son"
- The Temptations: "The Way You Do the Things You Do"
- Gary Lewis & the Playboys: "Count Me In"
- The Drifters: "Up on the Roof"
- The Supremes: "Stop! In the Name of Love"
- The Righteous Brothers: "You've Lost That Lovin' Feelin'"
- The Four Tops: "I Can't Help Myself (Sugar Pie, Honey Bunch)"
- The Miracles: "Ooo Baby Baby"
- Ray Charles: "What'd I Say"
