= Hurt So Bad =

1964 song by Little Anthony and the Imperials

Single by Little Anthony & The Imperials

from the album Goin' Out Of My Head
- B-side: "Reputation"
- Released: December 29, 1964
- Genre: Soul, pop
- Length: 2:15
- Label: DCP
- Songwriters: Teddy Randazzo, Bobby Weinstein, Bobby Hart
- Producers: Teddy Randazzo, Don Costa

Little Anthony & The Imperials singles chronology
"Goin' Out Of My Head" (1964)	"Hurt So Bad" (1964)	"Take Me Back" (1965)

"Hurt So Bad"

Single by The Lettermen

from the album Hurt So Bad
- B-side: "Catch the Wind"
- Released: 1969
- Recorded: 1969
- Genre: Pop, Easy listening
- Length: 2:18
- Label: Capitol
- Songwriters: Teddy Randazzo, Bobby Weinstein, Bobby Hart
- Producer: Al De Lory

The Lettermen singles chronology
"Blue on Blue" (1969)	"Hurt So Bad" (1969)	"Shangri-La" (1969)

"Hurt So Bad" is a song written by Teddy Randazzo, Bobby Weinstein, and Bobby Hart. It is a 1965 Top 10 hit ballad originally recorded by Little Anthony & The Imperials. Linda Ronstadt also had a Top 10 hit with her cover version in 1980. The song has been re-recorded by numerous artists including The Lettermen, who took the song to number twelve in September 1969.

== Little Anthony & The Imperials version ==
=== Background ===
Little Anthony & The Imperials' original version was taken from their album, Goin' out of My Head. It was the follow-up to that album's smash-hit title song, and like that song, also became a Billboard Top 10 hit as well as a Top Five R&B hit. This version reached number ten on the Billboard Hot 100, and number one in Canada. It was also performed by the group on their first appearance on The Ed Sullivan Show. It was written especially for The Imperials by Teddy Randazzo, a long-time friend of the group, along with Bobby Weinstein and Bobby Hart, and was produced by Don Costa for his DCP record label, later absorbed by United Artists Records and re-released on its Veep Records subsidiary. A powerful, dramatic ballad recording, it has become one of The Imperials' best-known songs, and has inspired numerous cover versions.

=== Personnel ===
- "Little Anthony" Gourdine - lead vocals
- Clarence "Wah-Hoo" Collins - baritone/bass
- Ernest Wright - second tenor
- Sammy Strain - first tenor
- Producer: Don Costa
- Backed by The 101 Strings Orchestra

== El Chicano version ==
=== Background ===
El Chicano released a cover of "Hurt So Bad" on their 1970 debut album Viva Tirado. It was one of 9 songs on the album, including their first hit single "Viva Tirado".

== Linda Ronstadt version ==
"Hurt So Bad"

Single by Linda Ronstadt

from the album Mad Love
- B-side: "Justine"
- Released: March 1980
- Genre: Rock, new wave
- Length: 3:17
- Label: Asylum
- Songwriters: Teddy Randazzo, Bobby Weinstein, Bobby Hart
- Producer: Peter Asher

Linda Ronstadt singles chronology
"How Do I Make You" (1980)	"Hurt So Bad" (1980)	"I Can't Let Go" (1980)

=== Background ===
Linda Ronstadt recorded a cover of "Hurt So Bad" for her Platinum-certified album, Mad Love, in 1980. Produced by Peter Asher on Asylum Records, it was released as the album's second single. Linda's version of the song featured a searing guitar solo by Danny Kortchmar. It stands as the most successful version ever recorded of the song, peaking at #8 on the Billboard Hot 100 and #9 on the Cash Box Top 100 chart for Ronstadt in the spring of 1980 . It was Ronstadt's final Top 10 hit on the Billboard Hot 100 as a solo artist.

=== Charts ===
Chart (1980)	Peak position
Canada Top Singles (RPM)	17
Canada Adult Contemporary (RPM)	37
Netherlands (Single Top 100)	43
US Billboard Hot 100	8
US Adult Contemporary (Billboard)	25

== Other versions ==
The song was covered by the following artists:

- The Lettermen, and Jackie DeShannon
- Ramsey Lewis, The Delfonics, David Cassidy, Richard "Groove" Holmes, Grant Green, Willie Bobo, Nancy Wilson, Anne Renée (fr) (rendered in French as "Ça Fait Mal"), Susan Rafey, Nancy Holloway, Alicia Keys, and others.
