= Fox Theatre (Brooklyn) =

Theater in Brooklyn, New York (1928–1970)

Coordinates: 40°41′17″N 73°58′51″W

Postcard of the Fox Theatre in Brooklyn.

Fox Theatre (FT) was a movie palace and theatre in Brooklyn, New York located at 10 - 20 Flatbush Avenue that operated from 1928 until 1970. It was demolished in 1971.

== History ==
The FT was built at the intersection of Flatbush Avenue and Nevins Street in Fort Greene, Brooklyn. It was established by William Fox, founder of the Fox Film Corporation, who had earlier begun his career in film in Brooklyn; opening his first nickelodeon there in 1904. A movie palace, the FT was designed by architects C. Howard Crane and Kenneth Franzheim. It was built at the cost of eight million dollars, and had an original seating capacity of 4,305 people; although later seating capacity was decreased to 4,062 people. The building also included a 12 story office building.

The Fox Theatre opened on August 31, 1928 with a combination of a live stage show, Carnival des Naples, and a screening of the film Street Angel. Included in the live show were excerpts from the opera Tannhäuser by Richard Wagner, and a jazz and dance version of "The Blue Danube" called "Dance of the Blue Danube Blues". The architectural design of the FT incorporated a large and ornate clocktower. The theatre's interior integrated ornate art deco designs with a Southeast Asian inspired style. Fountains and a lit staircase were features of its lobby. A Wurlitzer opus theatre organ was installed. At the time the organ was built it was one of the largest theatre pipe organs ever constructed; with some sources claiming it was the largest at the time it was built.

When the FT opened it employed an in-house orchestra of sixty musicians. The practice of pairing live performance with film screenings continued into the 1930s. This included the vaudeville style revues like Sunkist Beauties, which featured a group of 30 or more beautiful girls who could tap dance, sing, and roller skate. During the peak of its popularity the theatre could draw as many as 12,000 patrons on a single Saturday night. It continued to operate as a movie theatre until its final film screening on February 6, 1966 when it played a double feature of Where the Spies Are and Johnny Nobody. At this time the theatre was averaging only 100 patrons an evening; a drop in attendance partly attributed to the rise is crime in the theatre's neighborhood which had also become increasingly run-down.

After February 1966, Murray the K organized a series of rock concerts at the venue, and it was also used as the home of Alfredo Salmaggi's opera company during the late 1960s. The final performance at the theatre was by the organist Bill Gage on November 4, 1970 with a last performance on the theater's massive pipe organ in a concert titled "Farewell to the Fox: October 31, 1928, to November 4, 1970. Bill Gage at the Mighty Wurlitzer.". The New York Times noted that the dating of October 31, 1928 in the concert title was inaccurate when writing a retrospective on the theatre at the time of its demolition in January 1971.

== Images of the Fox Theatre ==
Partial view of the northeast end of the Fox Theatre along Flatbush Ave.

Entrance to the Fox Theatre on Flatbush Ave.

Northeast end of the lobby of the Fox Theatre.

Southwest end of the lobby of the Fox Theatre.

Ceiling and upper northeast wall details in the lobby of the Fox Theatre.

Decorative bas-relief panel in the lobby of the Fox Theatre

Fountain in the lobby of the Fox Theatre.

Northeast staircase in the Fox Theatre

Proscenium and part of auditorium northeast wall from balcony of the Fox Theatre.

Fountain along the northeast wall of the auditorium of the Fox Theatre

Lower balcony level passage looking west of the Fox Theatre

Balcony of the Fox Theatre

Northeast half of the mezzanine of the Fox Theatre

Gryphon detail at the northeast base of the proscenium at the Fox Theatre.

Organ console of the Fox Theatre
