= Murray the K =

American DJ (1922–1982)

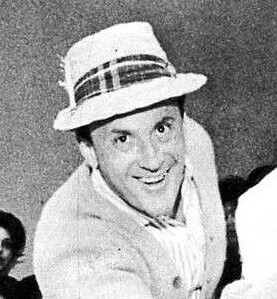
- Kaufman in 1966
- Born: Murray Kaufman; February 14, 1922; New York City, New York, U.S.
- Died: February 21, 1982 (aged 60); Los Angeles, California, U.S.
- Occupation: Disc jockey
- Years active: 1958–1981

Murray Kaufman (February 14, 1922 – February 21, 1982), professionally known as Murray the K, was a New York City rock and roll impresario and disc jockey of the 1950s, 1960s and 1970s. During the early days of Beatlemania, he frequently referred to himself as the fifth Beatle.

== Early life ==
Murray Kaufman came from a show business family: his mother, Jean, played piano in vaudeville and wrote music and his aunt was a character actress on the stage and in film. He was a child actor—an extra—in several 1930s Hollywood films. He attended Peekskill Military Academy, a military boarding school, and he was later inducted into the United States Army where he arranged entertainment for the troops. Following the war, he put together shows in the Catskills' "Borscht Belt", also doing warm-ups for the headline performers.

== Post-war ==
In the late 1940s and early 1950s, he worked in public relations and as a song plugger, helping to promote tunes like Bob Merrill's "(How Much Is) That Doggie in the Window?." From there, he worked as a radio producer and co-host at WMCA (and briefly thereafter at WAAT), working with personalities such as Laraine Day on the late night interview program Day at Night and with Eva Gabor. At the same time, he was doing promotion for several baseball players, including Mickey Mantle and Willie Mays, and his radio beginnings may be attributable to his connection with the New York Giants, whose manager, Leo Durocher, was the husband of Laraine Day. His work on those shows earned him his own late-night show that often featured his wife as co-host, as was popular at the time. For a while in the 1950s he was president of the National Conference of Disk Jockeys.

== Deejay: from AM to FM ==
=== "This meeting of the Swingin' Soiree is now in session!" ===
Kaufman's big break came in 1958 after he moved to WINS/1010 to do the all-night show, which he titled The Swingin' Soiree. Shortly after his arrival, WINS's high-energy star disc jockey, Alan Freed, was indicted for tax evasion and forced off the air. Though Freed's spot was briefly occupied by Bruce Morrow, who later became known as Cousin Brucie on WABC, Murray was soon moved into the 7–11 pm time period and remained there for the next seven years, always opening his show with Sinatra and making radio history with his innovative segues, jingles, sound effects, antics, and frenetic, creative programming. Jeff Rice, writing in M/C Journal, says that Tom Wolfe calls Murray "the original hysterical disk jockey".

=== "The Fifth Beatle" ===
Murray the K reached his peak of popularity in the mid-1960s when, as the top-rated radio host in New York City, he became an early and ardent supporter and friend of the Beatles. When the Beatles came to New York on February 7, 1964, Murray was the first DJ they welcomed into their circle, having heard about him and his Brooklyn Fox Theatre shows from American groups such as the Ronettes (sisters Ronnie and Estelle Bennett and their first cousin Nedra Talley). The Ronettes met the Beatles in mid-January 1964, just a few weeks before, when the Harlem-born trio first toured England (the Rolling Stones were the group's opening act). The Beatles and Decca Records (distributor of Philles Records, the Ronettes' American label) jointly threw the Ronettes a welcome party in London. When the band arrived in New York, Murray was invited by Brian Epstein to spend time with the group, and Murray persuaded his radio station (WINS) to let him broadcast his prime time show from the Beatles' Plaza Hotel suite. He subsequently accompanied the band to Washington, D.C. for their first American concert, was backstage at their The Ed Sullivan Show premiere, and roomed with Beatles guitarist George Harrison in Miami, broadcasting his nightly radio shows from his hotel room there.

Murray came to be referred to as the "Fifth Beatle", a moniker he said he was given by Harrison during the train ride to the Beatles' first concert in Washington, D.C. or by Ringo Starr at a press conference before that concert. (However, in The Beatles: The First U.S. Visit he is seen christening himself thus in a phone conversation with the Beatles on the morning of their arrival in New York.) His radio station WINS picked up on the name and billed him as the Fifth Beatle, a moniker he came to regret. He was invited to the set of A Hard Day's Night in England and made several treks to England during 1964, giving WINS listeners more Beatle exclusives.

=== The move to FM ===
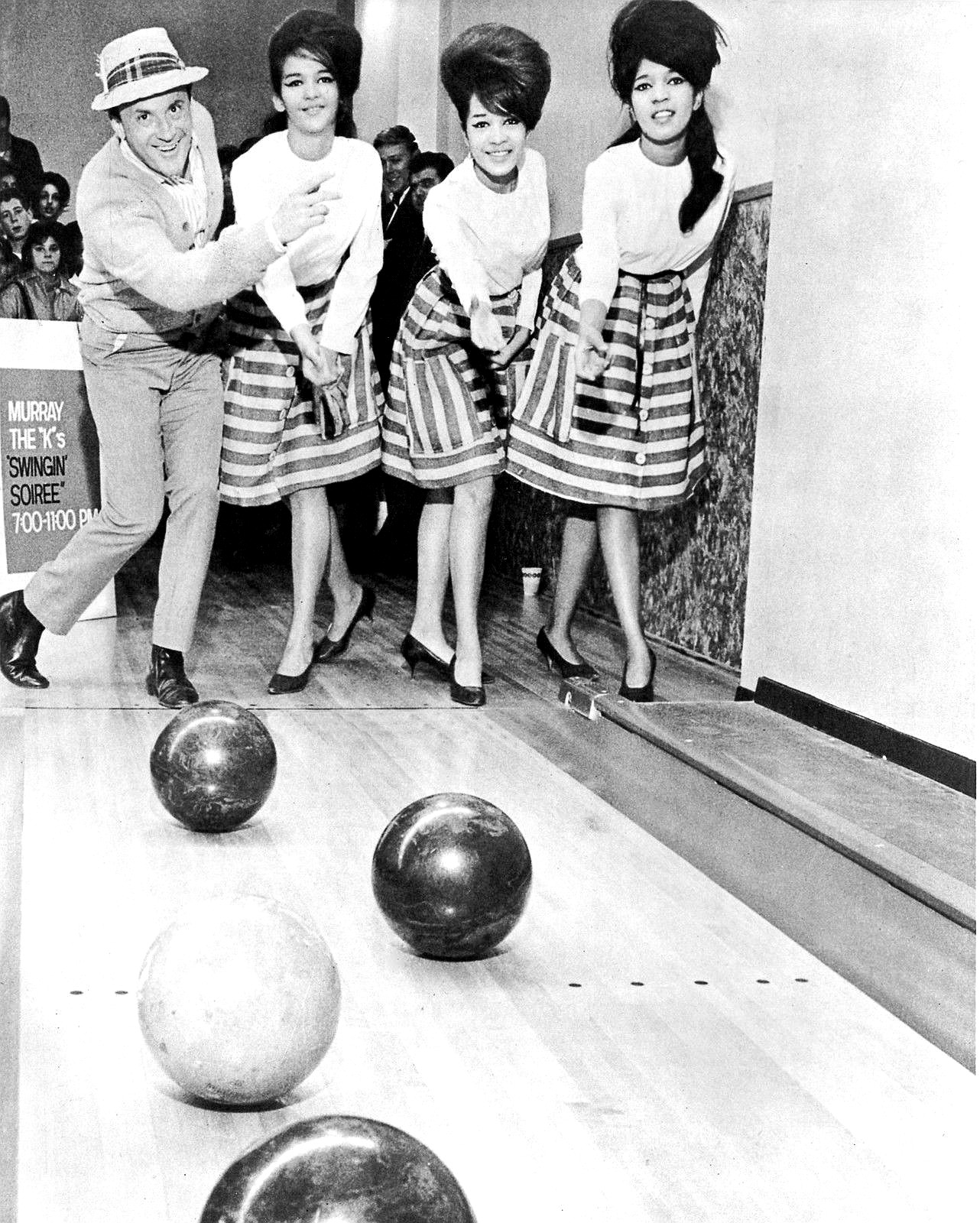
Murray the K and the Ronettes

In December 1964, Murray announced his intention to resign from WINS on the air, breaking the news that the station had been sold and would soon switch to an all-news format. He did his last show on February 27, 1965, before the format change in April 1965. A year later, in 1966, the Federal Communications Commission (FCC) ruled that AM and FM radio stations could no longer simultaneously broadcast the same content. This enabled Murray to become program director and primetime DJ on WOR-FM, 98.7—one of the first FM rock stations, soon airing such DJs as Rosko and Scott Muni in the new FM format. Murray played long album cuts rather than singles, often playing groups of songs by one artist, or thematically linked songs, uninterrupted by commercials. He combined live in-studio interviews with folk-rock—he called it "attitude music"—and all forms of popular music in a free-form format. He played artists such as Bob Dylan and Janis Ian and the long, album versions of their songs that came to be known as the "FM cuts". Al Aronowitz quotes Murray as saying about this formula, "You didn't have to hype the record any more. The music was speaking for itself."

=== Dylan ===
Murray championed Bob Dylan after his much-maligned decision to go electric. He introduced him to boos at a huge Forest Hills Tennis Stadium concert in August 1965, saying, "It's not rock, it's not folk, it's a new thing called Dylan."

He defended Dylan on a WABC-TV panel. Wrote the Saturday Evening Post: "Even in his months of seclusion after the motorcycle accident, WABC-TV dedicated a television show to a discussion of what Bob Dylan was really like. When one member of the panel accused Dylan of all but inventing juvenile delinquency, there was only Murray the K to defend him. 'Is Bob Dylan every kid's father?' Murray asked."

=== Last years in radio ===
WOR-FM switched to the tighter and hit-oriented Drake format, in which DJs weren't allowed to pick the music and talk as much, so Murray the K left New York radio in August 1967 to host programs in Toronto—on CHUM—and on WHFS 102.3 FM in Bethesda, Maryland, in 1972. He returned to New York after his short stint on WHFS on the weekend show NBC Monitor and as a fill-in morning DJ, and then in 1972 moved to a regular evening weekend program on WNBC radio where Don Imus was broadcasting; he was joined there by the legendary Wolfman Jack, a year later. Although it was low-key, Murray's WNBC show featured his innovative trademark programming style, including telling stories that were illustrated by selected songs, his unique segues, and his pairing cuts by theme or idiosyncratic associations. In early 1975, he was brought on for a brief stint at Long Island progressive rock station WLIR, and his final New York radio show ran later that year on WKTU after which—already in ill health—he moved to Los Angeles. The syndicated show Soundtrack of the '60s mentioned below was heard in New York City on WCBS-FM. Gary Owens succeeded Murray as its host.

== Brooklyn Fox shows ==
Throughout his New York radio career, Kaufman produced multi-racial rock 'n' roll shows three or four times a year, usually during the Easter school recess, the week before Labor Day, and between Christmas and New Year at the Brooklyn Fox Theatre on 20 Flatbush Avenue. Those shows featured the top performers of the era and introduced new acts, such as the Delicates, Dionne Warwick, the Shirelles, Chuck Jackson, the Zombies, Little Anthony and the Imperials, the Ronettes, the Shangri-Las, Gene Pitney, Ben E. King, the Tymes, Smokey Robinson & the Miracles and Bobby Vinton (who was the leader of the house band when he asked for a chance to perform as a singer). In 1967, the show moved to the RKO 58th St. theater in Manhattan for a 9-day stint and was called "Music in the Fifth Dimension". It featured both traditional rock acts and some of the new progressive rock acts, including Cream, the Who, Phil Ochs, Simon & Garfunkel, Mitch Ryder, the Young Rascals and the Blues Project, among others.

== Records, television, stage, and syndication ==
Throughout his radio career, from the 1950s through the 1970s, Murray also released numerous LP record albums, often compilations of hits by the acts that appeared in his famous Brooklyn Fox shows. These albums frequently had names such as Murray the K's Blasts from the Past or Murray the K's Sing Along with the Original Golden Gassers. He also released two albums of shows recorded live from the Brooklyn Fox Theatre: Murray the K's Holiday Revue (1964) and Greatest Holiday Revue (1966), combined on the two-record set Live as it Happened (1976).

"Meusurray" (named after a language game Murray invented and based on a technique used by carnival barkers to attract a crowd was a regular shtick on his 1010 WINS radio show) was a single by the girl group the Delicates, released on the United Artists label. The Delicates were Denise Ferri, Arleen Lanzotti and Peggy Santiglia ("Murray's Original Dancing Girls") They wrote the song which was arranged by Don Costa. The Delicates also wrote and recorded his "Submarine Race Watcher" theme, used to open and close his radio show. It was during the "twist craze" that Kaufman introduced a song sung by an unidentified artist named, "The Lone Twister", which in fact was Murray.

In the mid-1960s, Murray also produced and hosted television variety shows featuring rock performers. The best known was a national broadcast entitled It's What's Happening, Baby which was made under the auspices of the Equal Employment Opportunity Commission. The show aired on June 28, 1965 and featured performances by many of the popular artists of the day, including Jan & Dean, Mary Wells, the Dave Clark Five, the Supremes, the Drifters, Smokey Robinson & the Miracles, Ray Charles, Marvin Gaye, the Ronettes and the Righteous Brothers. He also ran shows with British Invasion bands that included the Zombies and the Yardbirds (who featured both Jeff Beck, and Jimmy Page of Led Zeppelin fame, on guitar). That show also introduced the first music video-style programming, pre-dating MTV by 15 years.

In 1966, Murray collaborated with media art collective USCO to design and produce the psychedelic multimedia event The World, which took place in the Roosevelt Field abandoned airplane hangar in Long Island and was dubbed the first discotheque. Live and recorded music played while slides and film were projected onto the crowd. Music acts that performed included the Young Rascals, the Hollies, Del Shannon, the Isley Brothers, and Mitch Ryder and the Detroit Wheels. The World was featured on the cover of Life magazine in May 1966.

In 1967, Murray produced and wrote "Murray the K in New York" which expanded on the music video-style approach he began in It's What's Happening, Baby and featured an eclectic line-up of stars, including the Doors, Otis Redding, Aretha Franklin, Spanky & Our Gang, and the Four Tops with guest appearances by Ed Sullivan and Joe Namath.

Other locally broadcast shows from the period included "Murray the K at Shea" with James Brown and the Four Seasons and "Music in the Year 2000."

In 1968, Murray produced and hosted a studio panel discussion program entitled "The Sound is Now"; it included appearances by Phil Ochs and Sonny and Cher who were grilled by Henry Morgan and Tex McCrary.

During the early 1970s, Murray acted as a special consultant to the stage show Beatlemania, and he toured the country giving interviews on behalf of the show.

In Los Angeles in the late 1970s he hosted Watermark's syndicated Soundtrack of the '60s until ill health forced him to resign and forced the cancellation of A Salute to Murray the K, a tribute concert slated for Madison Square Garden.

== Film ==
Kaufman was parodied in the film The Rutles – All You Need Is Cash as a radio host named Bill Murray the K, played by actor Bill Murray. Kaufman appeared as a guest star on the 1960s television series Coronet Blue and also appeared as himself in the film I Wanna Hold Your Hand. He also appeared in the 1975 film That's the Way of the World.

He will be portrayed by American actor Ben Schwartz in The Beatles – A Four-Film Cinematic Event (2028).

== Family and death ==
He was married six times and had three sons, Peter (Altschuler), Jeff and Keith. His first wife, Anna May, died in childbirth. He was married to his second, Toni, for three years; his third, Beverly, for three months; his fourth, Claire, for about nine years in the 1950s; his fifth, Jackie Hayes (called "Jackie the K"), from January 1960 until September 1978; and finally, his sixth, actress Jackie Zeman, for just one year, although they were together for seven years before marrying.

Kaufman died of cancer on February 21, 1982, a week after his 60th birthday.

== Legacy ==
He shares writing credit with his mother and Bobby Darin for Darin's breakout song, "Splish Splash".

Beginning in 1960, Kaufman's rock 'n' roll shows at the Brooklyn Paramount theater (as co-host with Clay Cole), Manhattan's Academy of Music theater on 14th Street and, predominantly, the Brooklyn Fox theater provided an inter-racial environment in which the performers and the audiences both thrived. The week-long, three-shows-a-day presentations continued throughout the most explosive periods of civil rights unrest in the mid-'60s, culminating in Kaufman's final show at the Brooklyn Fox Theater with a line-up that included The Who and Cream in their American debuts.

Murray was the author of a 1966 book, Murray the K Tells It Like It Is, Baby.

Kaufman was program director and primetime evening DJ on the nation's first FM rock station WOR-FM, changing the way in which radio listeners heard rock music. During the short run of progressive rock programming – the station switched to an oldies format within the first year – listeners would have been able to hear the full, album versions of songs including "Like A Rolling Stone" and "Society's Child" which were either played in shorter versions on AM radio or not played at all.

He is mentioned in the 1980 Ramones song "Do You Remember Rock 'n' Roll Radio?" as well as "Who Will Save Rock 'n' Roll" by the Dictators. He is also mentioned in "Life Is a Rock (But the Radio Rolled Me)" by Reunion.

A recording of Murray the K introducing the band Devo appears on their live compilation DEVO Live: The Mongoloid Years.

Murray the K introduced Bruce Springsteen and the E Street Band as the band took the stage on November 4, 1976 in New York City.

He was inducted into the National Radio Hall of Fame in 1997.

=== Recordings made by Murray Kaufman ===
- April 1955: Fraternity F-714 "The Crazy Otto Rag" as by Ludwig Von Kaufman/"Out Of The Bushes" as by Murray Kaufman (made while a DJ at WMCA)
- 1959: Murray Kaufman Part 1/Part 2 (Part 1 is a 1010WINS radio jingle item featuring Murray and the Delicates and his themes; Part 2 is his "Ah, Bey, ah bey, koowi zowa zowa" chant, along with an explanation of its meaning.) The chant was lifted intact from a Thomas J. Valentino music library recording (on the Major Records label) entitled "African Drums With Native Chants" on the A side and "Drums (African)", "Native Work Chant (African)", and "Native Choral Chant (African)" on the B side.
- 1961: Atlantic 2130 "The Lone Twister"/"Twistin' Up A Storm" as by The Lone Twister
- 1965: Red Bird 10-045 "It's What's Happenin, Baby"/"The Sins Of A Family" as by 'Murray the "K"'. (The B side was a P. F. Sloan song.)
