= Teddy Randazzo =

American pop singer-songwriter (1935–2003)

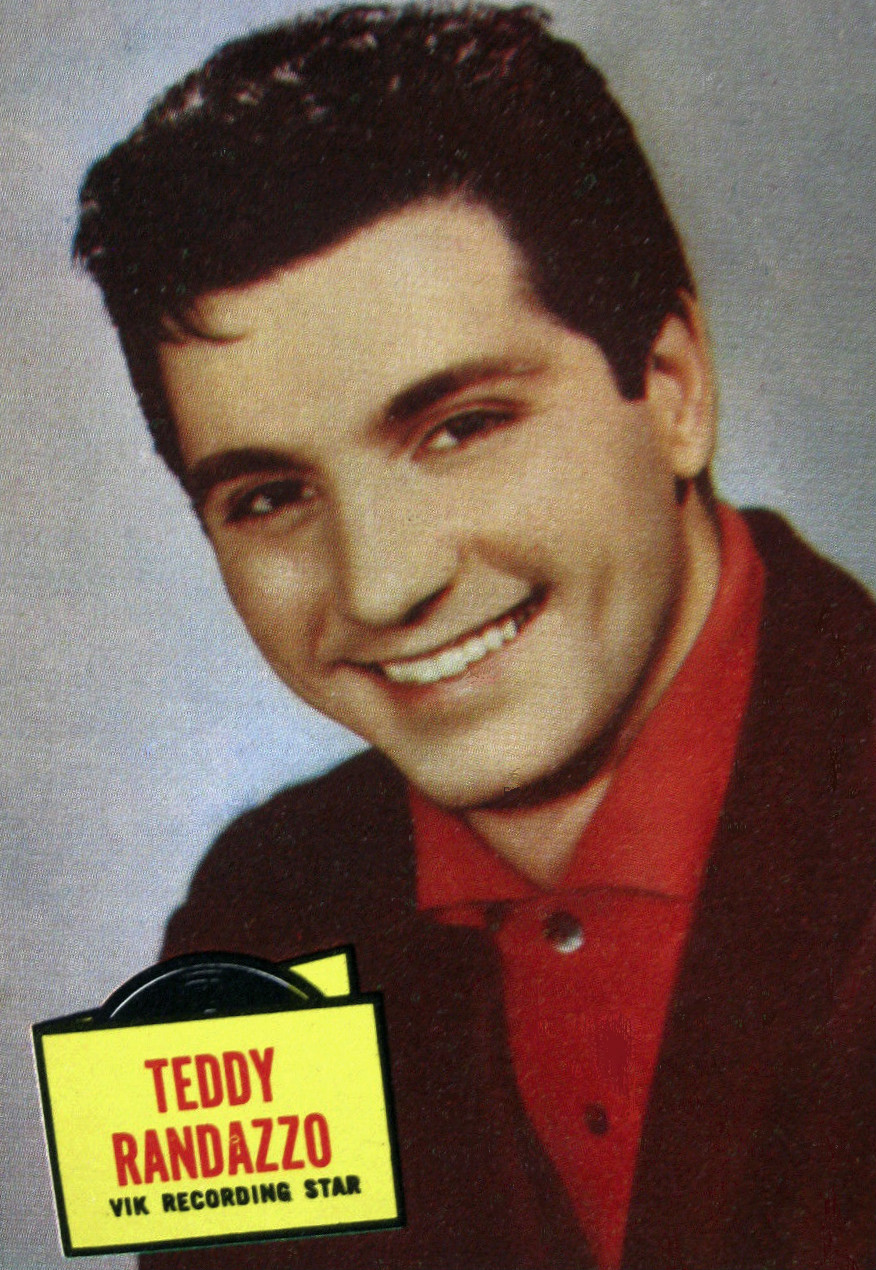
- Randazzo in 1957

Background information
- Born: Alessandro Carmelo Randazzo; May 13, 1935; Brooklyn, New York, U.S.
- Died: November 21, 2003 (aged 68) Orlando, Florida, U.S.
- Genres: Pop
- Occupations: Songwriter, singer, arranger, record producer
- Years active: 1954–1980s

Alessandro Carmelo "Teddy" Randazzo (May 13, 1935 – November 21, 2003) was an American pop songwriter, singer, arranger, and producer who composed hit songs such as "Goin' Out of My Head", "It's Gonna Take a Miracle", "Pretty Blue Eyes", and "Hurt So Bad" in the 1960s.

== Early years ==
He was born in Brooklyn. In the early years of rock and roll, Randazzo played accordion with a group called the Three Chuckles, and appeared on The Ed Sullivan Show numerous times. Their first hit, "Runaround", was a top 20 hit in 1954. The following year, he became the group's lead singer, and sang on their hits "Times Two, I Love You" and "And the Angels Sing". The records' success brought him to the attention of disc jockey Alan Freed, who featured him in the movie Rock, Rock, Rock.

As a solo artist, he had three singles that made the Billboard Hot 100: "Little Serenade" (number 66) in 1958, "The Way of a Clown" (number 44) in 1960, and "Big Wide World" (number 51) in 1963. He co-starred in rock revues staged by Freed, appearing with such artists as Chuck Berry and LaVern Baker. He also had roles in such rock films as Hey, Let's Twist!, The Girl Can't Help It, Rock, Rock, Rock and Mister Rock and Roll in the late 1950s and early 1960s.

== Hit-making years ==
Randazzo wrote a string of major hits for other artists with composing partner, Bobby Weinstein, including "Pretty Blue Eyes", a top ten hit for Steve Lawrence in the US and Craig Douglas in the UK in 1959. He wrote many songs for Little Anthony and the Imperials, producing and arranging several albums for the group in the mid-1960s. The hits included "Goin' Out of My Head" (1964, number 6 Pop, number 22 R&B), which was subsequently recorded by numerous artists including the Zombies; "Hurt So Bad" (1965, number 10 Pop, number 3 R&B), which was recorded four years later by the Lettermen (number 12 in 1969), and then by Linda Ronstadt who took it to number 8 in 1980; and the Imperials' Top 20 hits, "I'm On The Outside (Looking In)" and "Take Me Back". The Lettermen combined "Goin' Out of My Head" with Frankie Valli's hit "Can't Take My Eyes Off You" in a medley which reached number 7 in 1968. Randazzo also wrote Little Anthony and the Imperials' "Yesterday Has Gone", which was recorded by UK band Cupid's Inspiration in 1968, and climbed to number 4 in the UK Singles Chart; the song was also recorded in 1996 by Marc Almond and P. J. Proby.

He arranged and produced two albums on MGM Records with Baltimore girl group the Royalettes, including the Top 50 hit "It's Gonna Take a Miracle" in 1965. He gave the group a big production sound with a full orchestra (compared to sparser instrumentation for Little Anthony recordings), but the group failed to achieve a major commercial success. Laura Nyro, teaming up with Philadelphia soul producers Kenny Gamble and Leon Huff, recorded the song for her 1971 album, Gonna Take a Miracle, with background vocals for the album performed by Labelle. This Nyro recording was featured in A Home at the End of the World (2004). "Miracle" was revived in 1982 by Deniece Williams, who took it to the number 1 R&B spot and number 10 in the Hot 100.

"I Want to Meet Him", the Royalettes' follow-up in 1966, reached the Hot 100 and the Top 30 in the R&B chart. All of the 27 songs that Randazzo produced on the group's two albums, plus another issued on single, appeared on a CD retrospective of the Royalettes' complete MGM output released by UK label, RPM in late 2010.

Many of Randazzo's tunes became pop classics, recorded by a gamut of musicians from Ella Fitzgerald to Frank Sinatra. "Goin' Out of My Head" is now included in the Top 50 most recorded songs with sales of over 100 million by over 400 artists, according to the Songwriters' Hall Of Fame. Later, he provided several songs for albums by New York soul group, the Manhattans, during their 1970s heyday, including the 1977 hit, "It Feels So Good To Be Loved So Bad" (number 6 R&B, number 66 Pop), "There's No Good in Goodbye", and "A Million to One". He also wrote and produced for the Stylistics. Albums include Fashionably Yours and Love Spell. Also during this period, Randazzo co-wrote songs with Roger Joyce and Souren Mozian, as well as his then girlfriend Victoria Pike, who was his first wife with whom he also had a daughter, Elisa Randazzo.

During the early and mid-1960s, Randazzo toured extensively with his own band, appearing at the Copacabana in New York, the Hotel Americana in San Juan, and regularly at the Thunderbird Hotel in Las Vegas. Band members included Larry Taylor, Gerry McGee, Tommy Boyce, Bobby Hart, Vince Megna, Billy Lewis, Kenny Rankin, Bobby Vincent, Bobby Weinstein, and Billy Barberis. Randazzo was especially popular in Hawaii, where his early recordings had topped the local record charts.

== Later life and death ==
There is some confusion about Teddy's wives, who and how many there were. According to primary source research, Teddy's first wife was Caroline Van Loock, a Las Vegas show girl who came from Alaska. They met in Las Vegas where they both performed. They are survived by a son, Teddy Randazzo, Jr. who lives in California. Randazzo’s (second) wife was Victoria Pike, with whom he had a daughter, Elisa Randazzo. Randazzo and Pike wrote a lot of songs together, amongst which Rain in My Heart by Frank Sinatra. They divorced in 1977.

Randazzo later married R. Shelly Kunewa of Hawaii and divided his time between their home in the islands and their home in Florida for most of the latter half of his life. He continued writing and producing. Randazzo produced and arranged Keola & Kapono Beamer's Honolulu City Lights album for Tom Moffatt's Paradise Records Label. The title song was a hit and the album became a local classic in Hawaii. In 2004, the editors of Honolulu Magazine asked a panel of local recording industry veterans to rank their choices for the best Hawaii album "of all time." Honolulu City Lights was chosen as number 1.

Randazzo died at the age of 68 at his home in Orlando. He is survived by seven children, including his eldest son Teddy Randazzo Jr., and daughter Elisa Randazzo.

== Songwriters Hall of Fame ==
Randazzo and his writing partner, Bobby Weinstein, were inducted into the Songwriters Hall of Fame in 2007, fifty years after they first started writing songs together.

== See also ==
- List of Italian American entertainers
