= Little Anthony and the Imperials =

Rhythm and blues/soul vocal group from New York

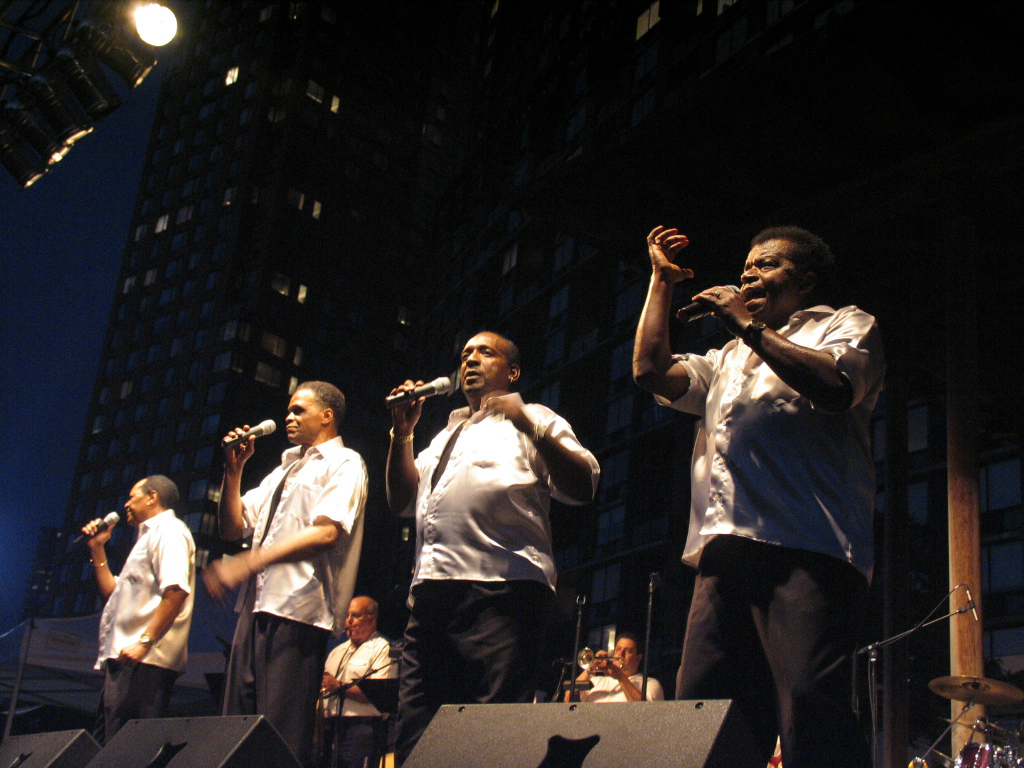
- Little Anthony and the Imperials in 2005, New York City. (L to R) Harold Jenkins, Ernest Wright, Clarence Collins, Jerome "Little Anthony" Gourdine

Background information
- Also known as: The Chesters (1957-1958); The Imperials (1958, 1975-1988); Anthony and The Imperials (1966-1969, 1975); Bobby Wade's Imperials (1988-1992)
- Origin: Brooklyn, New York City, United States
- Genres: Rhythm and blues; doo-wop; soul
- Years active: 1957–present
- Labels: End; Roulette; London; United Artists; Ridge Records; Avco; Janus; Veep Records; DCP Records
- Members: Jerome "Little Anthony" Gourdine; Ernest Wright; Robert Deblanc; Johnny Britt
- Past members: Clarence "Wa-hoo" Collins; Samuel "Sammy" Strain; Glouster "Nate" Rogers; Tracy Lord; Bobby Wade; Harold "Hawk" Jenkins; Kenny W. Seymour, Sr. George Kerr; Sherman James; Ron Stevenson; Ronald Ross
- Website: littleanthonyandtheimperials.org

Little Anthony and the Imperials is an American rhythm and blues, doo-wop, and soul vocal group from New York City founded by Clarence Collins in the 1950s and named in part for its lead singer, Jerome Anthony "Little Anthony" Gourdine, who was noted for his high-pitched voice. In addition to Collins and Gourdine, the original Imperials included Ernest Wright, Glouster "Nate" Rogers, and Tracy Lord, the last two of whom were subsequently replaced by Sammy Strain.

The group was one of the very few doo-wop groups to enjoy sustained success on the R&B and pop charts throughout the 1960s. They were inducted into the Rock and Roll Hall of Fame on April 4, 2009, 23 years after the group's first year of eligibility for induction.

== Career ==
=== Early years, "Tears on My Pillow", and "Shimmy, Shimmy, Ko-Ko-Bop" (1957–1961) ===
In 1957, a doo-wop group known as "The Chesters" was composed of Collins, Tracey Lord, Nathaniel Rodgers, and Ronald Ross. Anthony Gourdine, a former member of The DuPonts, whose falsetto had been inspired by Jimmy Scott, joined as lead vocalist. Ernest Wright took over from Ross, and the group recorded briefly for Apollo Records.

The Chesters were later signed by End Records, owned by George Goldner. According to a biography of the group published by the Rock and Roll Hall of Fame, End Records renamed the group "The Imperials", as the group "want[ed] a name more regal than the Chesters." Legendary rock and roll DJ Alan Freed gave Gourdine the nickname and stage name "Little Anthony" because of "the youthful quality in [Gourdine's] voice". Freed and another DJ/promoter, Murray Kaufman (more well-known as Murray the K) helped the group's career by playing their records and booking them for concerts.

Their first single with their new name was 1958's "Tears on My Pillow", one of the biggest hits of the year. It sold over one million copies, and the group was awarded a gold disc by the RIAA. Its B-side was "Two People in the World".

Their next several singles flopped, despite the Rock and Roll Hall of Fame and Museum's view that they were "strong" choices for singles. Their 1960 single, the uptempo "Shimmy, Shimmy, Ko-Ko-Bop", was their next hit.

=== Gourdine briefly departs and classic lineup forms (1961–1969) ===
When their success dwindled in 1961, Gourdine left to attempt a solo career and pursue acting. Original Imperials member Nate Rogers was drafted into the service, and fellow original member Tracey Lord left the group to get married. The lineup then became Collins, Wright, Sammy Strain (a childhood friend who had grown up together with the Imperials in Brooklyn), and George Kerr. Kerr was replaced by Kenny W. Seymour after a short time. This line-up had little success and primarily performed for two years at resorts in the "Borscht Belt" in the Catskills region of New York State.

Gourdine returned in 1963, replacing Seymour. The group's classic line-up – Gourdine, Wright, Collins, and Strain – was now complete. With the help of record producer/songwriter Teddy Randazzo (a childhood friend of the group), the Imperials found success on the new DCP (Don Costa Productions) label and were able to compete with the British Invasion and Motown with several dramatic pop-soul records "I'm on the Outside (Looking In)" (1964), "Goin' Out of My Head" (1964), "Hurt So Bad" (1965), "I Miss You So" (1965), "Take Me Back" (1965), "Hurt" (1966), "Better Use Your Head" (1966), and "Out of Sight, Out of Mind" (1969). "Goin' Out of My Head" and "Hurt So Bad" were consecutive top 10 pop hits on the Billboard Hot 100, reaching #6 and #10, respectively. Around this time, they were the first contemporary "pop" and R&B group to perform at the Copacabana nightclub in New York City.

In 1965, the Imperials appeared on the CBS-TV special Murray The K – It's What's Happening, Baby, where they performed "I'm Alright" before a live audience in New York at the Brooklyn Fox Theatre. At the height of their career, the group made two appearances on The Ed Sullivan Show, at the time television's top talent entertainment showcase, on March 28, 1965, and again on January 25, 1970. They also performed on Shindig!, Hullabaloo, Kraft Music Hall, Soul Train, American Bandstand, The Midnight Special, and The Tonight Show.

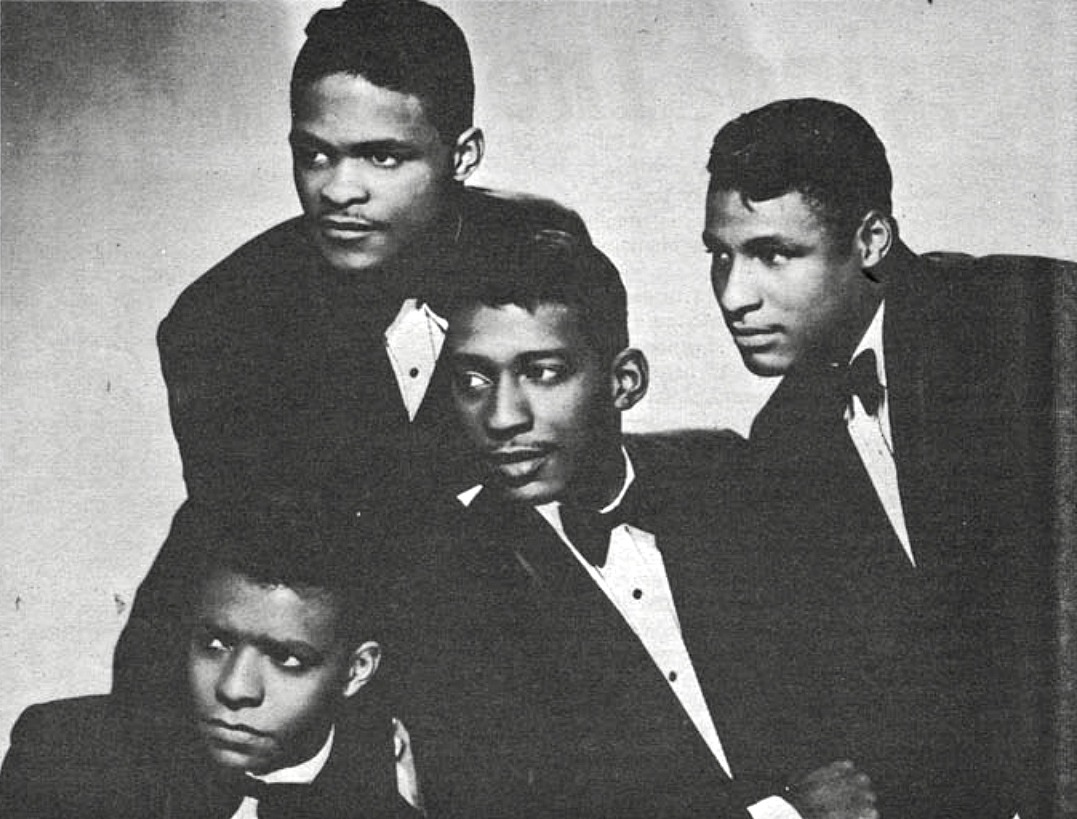
Little Anthony and the Imperials in 1967

The Imperials then joined United Artists Records and were assigned to its Veep Records subsidiary, and then to the parent label itself, where they recorded "World of Darkness", "It's Not the Same", "If I Remember to Forget", "Yesterday Has Gone", and the Thom Bell-produced "Help Me Find a Way (To Say I Love You)".

Albums from this era include: Reflections, Payin' Our Dues, Out of Sight, Out of Mind (named after their hit cover of The Five Keys' song), and Movie Grabbers, which included a rendition of "You Only Live Twice", the James Bond motion picture theme. This song was originally recorded by The Imperials – expressly for the film and its soundtrack – but was later given instead to Nancy Sinatra for the film, due to her father Frank's greater influence.

=== Numerous lineup changes, final hits, and frequent live performances (1969–1992) ===
In 1969, Wright left the group; he joined former The Platters lead singer Tony Williams' spinoff group. Wright was replaced briefly by a returning Kenny Seymour and then later by Bobby Wade. Wade had previously been based in Cleveland and had been a solo artist on local labels there.

In the early 1970s, they recorded three singles for Janus Records including "Father Father", which they later performed on the Merv Griffin Show.

Strain left in 1972; he was replaced the group's choreographer Harold Jenkins, who had previously worked with former member Kenny Seymour in a group called the Impacts. (Strain later joined the O'Jays as the replacement for original O'Jays member William Powell, who left the group due to illness.) Jenkins was also appointed the group's musical director.

The group later moved to Avco Records in the early-to-mid-1970s and recorded the album On A New Street, and charted with the songs "La La La (At the End)" and "I'm Falling in Love with You". This album was produced by both Bell and Randazzo. The latter was their last moderate hit on the Billboard R&B Singles chart, peaking at #25. A second LP for Avco Records, entitled Hold On, was withdrawn from sale in the US, after the sales failure of the title track and Avco's subsequent financial difficulties.

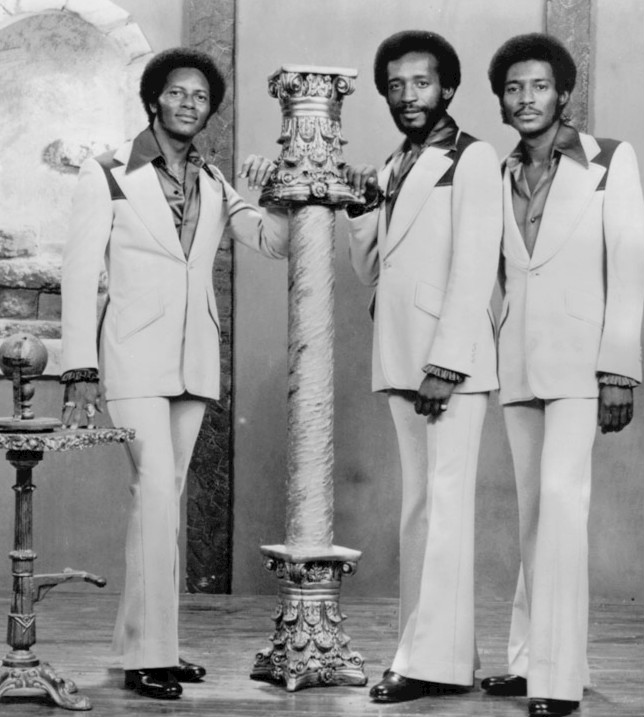
The Imperials in 1976. (L to R) Harold Jenkins, Clarence Collins and Bobby Wade

In 1975, Gourdine left for a second (and more successful) attempt at a solo career. The trio of Collins, Wade, and Jenkins continued as "the Imperials". They spent the mid-to-late 1970s "getting steady work in the [sic] Las Vegas lounges and on cruise ships". Collins left in 1988, and was replaced by Sherman James. They then toured as "Bobby Wade's Imperials". James left in 1992, and was replaced by Ron Stevenson.

=== Reunion, new albums, and various Hall of Fame inductions (1992–2023) ===
On January 10, 1992, Gourdine, Collins, Wright, and Strain reunited for a concert (called "Royalty of Rock: The Ultimate Reunion") at Madison Square Garden, alongside Dion & the Belmonts and Ronnie Spector, plus a one-off reunion of several former members of the Drifters (which included Ben E. King, Charlie Thomas, Johnny Moore, and Barry Hobbs). This reunion proved to be a success. When the decision was made for the foursome to tour together again, Wade relinquished the Imperials name, with his group becoming "Bobby Wade's Emperors" when they became the house band at Caesars Palace in Las Vegas. At this point, Strain left the O'Jays, and permanently returned to the Imperials. 1992, the year of the group's reformation, was also the 40th anniversary of Dick Clark's American Bandstand, and he invited the Imperials to appear as part of the televised special celebration.

In 1996, they recorded their first live album, Little Anthony & the Imperials – Live: Up Close & Personal. On August 30, 1997, the group was featured on NBC's Today show as part of that show's "Summer Concert Series".

In the early 2000s, they appeared on three popular PBS television specials: Rock, Rhythm, and Doo-Wop and Red, White and Rock in 2002; and Soul Spectacular: 40 Years of R&B in 2003. Also, during this period, they recorded Pure Acapella, an all a cappella CD showcasing the group's vocal talents on several classic 1950s doo-wop songs, including their own hit, "Two People in the World", which was written by Imperials member Ernest Wright. These two recordings marked the first time that the classic line-up had recorded together in over 30 years.

Gourdine, Collins, Wright, and Strain continued touring together until Strain retired in 2004, and Jenkins, for the second time, returned to take his place.

In 2008, Little Anthony and the Imperials released their first new album in several years, entitled You'll Never Know, and they performed on the Late Show with David Letterman on August 26, 2008.

The French electronic music duo Daft Punk sampled the group's 1977 recording of "Can You Imagine" for the track "Crescendolls".

On January 14, 2009, it was announced that Little Anthony and the Imperials had been inducted into the Rock and Roll Hall of Fame. Gourdine, Wright, Collins, Strain, and Rogers were present to be honored. Deceased original Imperials member Tracy Lord was inducted posthumously; his sons accepted his Rock and Roll Hall of Fame induction on his behalf. The group was inducted by Smokey Robinson. Sammy Strain is one of the few artists in popular music history to be a double Rock and Roll Hall of Fame inductee, having been inducted with the O'Jays in 2005 and the Imperials in 2009.

In October 2009, the group performed "Two People in the World" at the 25th Anniversary Rock & Roll Hall of Fame Concert.

In 2010, Jenkins also retired, and was replaced by Robert DeBlanc. In 2012, the Imperials were (along with the Dells), one of the few 1950s-era R&B groups still touring with a majority of their original members (Gourdine, Collins, and Wright). Imperials founder Collins retired from the group in late 2012 due to age and health reasons. He still owns the trademark on The Imperials' name. He and Anthony were once married to twin sisters, Brenda Collins and Linda Gourdine, but Brenda and Clarence have since divorced. The Contemporary Christian Gospel Group The Imperials uses the name with Collins' permission. Gourdine's first wife was Judy Fouseca, with whom he had four children, and four more by his second wife, Linda. Original member Wright is married and has a daughter, Nicole. He is also a songwriter and producer. Original Imperials bass singer Glouster "Nate" Rogers is a cancer survivor. He has been married many years to wife Loretta. Original Imperials member Tracey Lord is deceased.

In early 2014, Gourdine toured the UK with David Gest's Legends of Soul, when he performed "Tears on My Pillow" and "Goin' Out of My Head". The same year, he released his biography, Little Anthony: My Journey, My Destiny, recounting his life, his memories, and his years with The Imperials.

In 2014, Goldmine magazine inducted the Imperials into The Goldmine Hall of Fame. Editor Phil Marder referred to them as one of the few 1950s doo-wop groups (though the group hated that label) to consistently chart hits during the British Invasion. Goldmine also named Little Anthony and the Imperials as one of The 20 Greatest Doo-Wop Groups of All Time.

In 2018, Little Anthony and the Imperials were inducted into the Rhythm and Blues Music Hall of Fame in Detroit.

As of 2018, The Imperials were still performing. Imperials founder Collins, now retired, has been replaced by Johnny Britt. De Blanc and original members Wright and Gourdine round out the group. When the group is not touring, Gourdine does stage plays and currently also has a one-man show, which he is currently doing to support his recently released biography, and to celebrate his 55-plus years as a performer.

The group's most recent performance took place in May 2022. Since then, Gourdine (with Britt) has performed on the Happy Together Tour headlined by the Turtles in 2023 and 2025.

On April 24, 2023, Little Anthony & The Imperials were inducted into the newly established, Atlantic City Walk Of Fame presented by, The National R&B Music Society Inc. Little Anthony, Clarence Collins, Ernest Wright, Nate Rogers, and Sammy Strain were all in attendance to accept the honor. It was the first time all five were together since The Rock & Roll Hall of Fame induction in 2009. Norman Burnett of the vocal group The Tymes inducted the group. James Brown, The Delfonics and Grover Washington Jr., were also inducted in the inaugural class.

== Cover versions, influence, and legacy ==
Over the decades, in a measure of their profound influence, several of The Imperials' hit songs have been covered by numerous other artists of many different musical genres, including pop, jazz, MOR, rock, Latin, country, doo-wop, and R&B. Some examples:

- "Hurt So Bad" an Imperials' top ten song, was covered by Linda Ronstadt, as well as the Lettermen, Alicia Keys, Grant Green, the Delfonics, Nancy Wilson, Nancy Holloway, the Philly Devotions, Willie Hutch, Arthur Prysock, Tracy Huang, Cathy Carlson, Willie Bovain, Ramsey Lewis, Herb Alpert and The Tijuana Brass, and Nancy Holliday.
- "I'm on the Outside (Looking In)", a top 20 hit for the Imperials, has been covered by the Miracles, Johnny Mathis, Amy Winehouse, the Lettermen, and the Jaggerz.
- "Tears on My Pillow", the Imperials' first million-selling hit, has been covered by numerous artists, including the McGuire Sisters, Sha Na Na, New Edition, and S Club 8. Clem Snide recorded a cover for the Stubbs the Zombie soundtrack. "Tears on My Pillow" has also been covered by Timi Yuro, Chuck Jackson, Bobby Vee, Lou Christie, Martha and the Vandellas, Bobby Vinton, Johnny Tillotson, Neil Sedaka, Reba McEntire, Jodeci, Lorrie Morgan, Derrick Morgan with Lyn Tait & the Jets, Neils Children, Kylie Minogue, and the Fleetwoods.
- "Goin' Out of My Head", another top 10 hit, and Little Anthony and the Imperials' signature song, has had over 50 different cover versions by other artists, including the Delfonics, Vic Damone, Cilla Black, Petula Clark, Willie Bobo, Sergio Mendes and Brazil '66, Ella Fitzgerald, Lou Christie, Les McCann, the Lettermen, Ramsey Lewis, Luther Vandross, Ray Conniff, Frank Sinatra, Lawrence Welk, Florence Ballard, and the Miracles.
- "Better Use Your Head", the Imperials' 1966 transatlantic hit, has been covered by Barry Ryan, Robin Wilson, Dennis D'ell, and Marion Ryan.
- "Take Me Back", Little Anthony and the Imperials' 1965 top 20 hit, has been covered by Country Music artists Glen Campbell, Ronnie Dove and Sonny James.
- "If I Love You", a 1970 song by the Imperials, was later covered by The Stylistics on their first album for Avco Records two years later.
- "The Loneliest House on the Block", an early 1970s Imperials tune, from their album On A New Street, was covered by soul vocal group Blue Magic.
- The Imperials' 1968 single, "Yesterday Has Gone", was covered by UK band Cupid's Inspiration in 1968 and climbed to number 4 in the UK singles chart; the song was also recorded in 1996 by Marc Almond and P.J. Proby.
- "Two People In The World", the hit "B" side of The Imperials' first-million-selling hit, "Tears on My Pillow", has been covered by Paul and Paula, The Dovells, and The Marcels.

In addition, according to songwriter and producer Kenny Gamble, Little Anthony and the Imperials and their music were a major influence in the development of Philadelphia soul, and artists such as the Stylistics, the Delfonics, Blue Magic (who covered the Imperials' tune "The Loneliest House on the Block"), Chicago's Chi-Lites, and other groups. They were also the first contemporary music group to play New York's prestigious Copacabana nightclub, even predating the Temptations and Supremes.

== Awards ==
Little Anthony and the Imperials received the Rhythm and Blues Foundation's Pioneer Award in 1993. They were inducted into the Vocal Group Hall of Fame in 1999 and the Long Island Music Hall of Fame on October 15, 2006. In 2007, the Imperials were inducted into the Hit Parade Hall of Fame On January 14, 2009, it was announced that Little Anthony and the Imperials had been inducted into the Rock and Roll Hall of Fame. Gourdine, Wright, Collins, Strain, and Rogers were present to be honored. Deceased original Imperials member Tracy Lord was inducted posthumously; his sons accepted his Rock and Roll Hall of Fame induction on his behalf. The group was inducted by Smokey Robinson. In October 2009, the group performed "Two People in the World" at the 25th Anniversary Rock & Roll Hall of Fame Concert. In 2014, Goldmine magazine inducted the Imperials into The Goldmine Hall of Fame. Editor Phil Marder referred to them as one of the few 1950s doo-wop groups (though the group hated that label) to consistently chart hits during the British Invasion. Goldmine also named Little Anthony and the Imperials as one of The 20 Greatest Doo-Wop Groups of All Time.

Sammy Strain is one of the few artists in popular music history to be a double Rock and Roll Hall of Fame inductee, having been inducted with the O'Jays in 2005 and the Imperials in 2009.

In 2018, Little Anthony and the Imperials were inducted into the Rhythm and Blues Music Hall of Fame in Detroit.

On April 24, 2023, Little Anthony & The Imperials were inducted into the newly established, Atlantic City Walk Of Fame presented by, The National R&B Music Society Inc. Little Anthony, Clarence Collins, Ernest Wright, Nate Rogers, and Sammy Strain were all in attendance to accept the honor. It was the first time all five were together since The Rock & Roll Hall of Fame induction in 2009. Norman Burnett of the vocal group, The Tymes inducted the group. James Brown, The Delfonics and Grover Washington Jr., were also inducted in the inaugural class.

== Members ==
Current members

- Jerome "Little Anthony" Gourdine – lead vocals (1957–1961, 1963–1975, 1992–present)
- Ernest Wright – backing vocals (1957–1969, 1992–present)
- Robert Deblanc – backing vocals (2010–present)
- Johnny Britt – backing vocals, trumpet (2012–present)

Former members

- Ronald Ross – backing vocals (1957)
- Clarence "Wa-hoo" Collins – backing vocals (1957–1988, 1992–2012; one-off non-performing appearance in 2023)
- Glouster "Nate" Rogers – backing vocals (1957–c. 1961; one-off non-performing appearance in 2009 and 2023)
- Tracy Lord – backing vocals (1957–c. 1961; deceased)
- George Kerr – lead vocals (c. 1961)
- Samuel "Sammy" Strain – backing vocals (c. 1961–1972, 1992–2004; one-off non-performing appearance in 2009 and 2023)
- Kenny W. Seymour, Sr. – lead vocals (1961–1963); backing vocals (c. 1969)
- Bobby Wade – vocals (c. 1969–1992)
- Harold "Hawk" Jenkins – vocals, musical director (1972–1992, 2004–2010)
- Sherman James – vocals (1988–1992)
- Ron Stevenson – vocals (1992)

== Discography ==
=== Albums ===
Year	Title	Peak chart positions		Label
Year	Title	US	US R&B	Label
1959	We Are the Imperials, featuring Little Anthony	—	—	End
1961	Shades of the 40s	—	—	End
1964	I'm on the Outside Looking In	135	—	DCP
1965	Goin' Out of My Head	74	5	DCP
1965	The Best of Little Anthony & the Imperials	97	9	DCP
1966	Payin' Our Dues	—	—	Veep
1967	Reflections	—	—	Veep
1967	Movie Grabbers	—	—	Veep
1968	The Best of Anthony & the Imperials, Volume 2	—	—	Veep
1969	Out of Sight, Out of Mind	172	—	United Artists
1973	On A New Street	—	—	Avco
1975	Hold On (Note: Only demo copies existed until 2013, when this album was released in a 2-for-1 CD with The Imperials' On A New Street album by Soulmusic.Com Records.)	—	—	Avco
2008	You'll Never Know	—	—	
"—" denotes releases that did not chart.

=== Singles ===
Year	Song titles (A-side, B-side) Both sides from same album except where indicated	Label & number	Peak chart positions				Album
Year	Song titles (A-side, B-side) Both sides from same album except where indicated	Label & number	US	US R&B	Canada CHUM RPM	UK	Album
1958	"Tears on My Pillow" b/w "Two People in the World"; Original pressings shown as "The Imperials"	End 1027	4	2	3	—	We Are the Imperials featuring Little Anthony
1958	"So Much" b/w "Oh Yeah"	End 1036	87	24	—	—	We Are the Imperials featuring Little Anthony
1958	"The Diary" b/w "Cha Cha Henry"	End 1038	—	—	—	—	We Are the Imperials featuring Little Anthony
1959	"Wishful Thinking" b/w "When You Wish upon a Star"	End 1039	79	—	—	—	We Are the Imperials featuring Little Anthony
1959	"A Prayer and a Juke Box" b/w "River Path"	End 1047	81	—	—	—	The Greatest Hits of Little Anthony and the Imperials
1959	"I'm Alright" b/w "So Near Yet So Far"	End 1053	—	—	—	—	The Greatest Hits of Little Anthony and the Imperials
1959	"Shimmy, Shimmy, Ko-Ko-Bop" b/w "I'm Still in Love with You"	End 1060	24	14	20	—	The Greatest Hits of Little Anthony and the Imperials
1960	"My Empty Room" b/w "Bayou, Bayou Baby"	End 1067	86	—	—	—	Non-album tracks
1960	"I'm Taking a Vacation from Love" b/w "Only Sympathy"	End 1074	—	—	—	—	Non-album tracks
1960	"Limbo Part I" b/w "Limbo Part II"	End 1080	—	—	—		Non-album tracks
1961	"Formula of Love" b/w "Dream" (from Shades of the 40s)	End 1083	—	—	—	—	Non-album tracks
1961	"Please Say You Want Me" b/w "So Near Yet So Far" (from The Greatest Hits of Little Anthony and the Imperials)	End 1086	104	—	—	—	Non-album tracks
1961	"Traveling Stranger" b/w "Say Yeah"	End 1091	—	—	—	—	We Are the Imperials featuring Little Anthony
1961	"A Lovely Way to Spend an Evening" b/w "Dream"	End 1104	—	—	—	—	Shades of the 40s
1961	"That Lil' Ole Lovemaker Me" b/w "It Just Ain't Fair"	Roulette 4379	—	—	—	—	Non-album tracks
1964	"I'm on the Outside (Looking In)" b/w "Please Go"	DCP 1104	15	8	12	—	I'm on the Outside (Looking In)
1964	"Goin' Out of My Head" b/w "Make It Easy on Yourself" (from I'm on the Outside (Looking In))	DCP 1119	6	6	1	—	Goin' Out of My Head
1965	"Hurt So Bad" b/w "Reputation"	DCP 1128	10	3	6	—	Goin' Out of My Head
1965	"Take Me Back" b/w "Our Song" (from I'm on the Outside (Looking In))	DCP 1136	16	15	3	—	Goin' Out of My Head
1965	"I Miss You So" b/w "Get Out of My Life"	DCP 1149	34	23	10	—	Goin' Out of My Head
1965	"Hurt" b/w "Never Again"	DCP 1154	51	—	14	—	Goin' Out of My Head
1966	"Better Use Your Head" b/w "The Wonder of It All"	Veep 1228	54	—	—	42	Payin' Our Dues
1966	"You Better Take It Easy Baby" b/w "Gonna Fix You Good (Every Time You're Bad)"	Veep 1233	125	—	—	—	Payin' Our Dues
1966	"It's Not the Same" b/w "Down on Love" (Non-album track); As "Anthony & the Imperials"	Veep 1248	92	—	—	—	Payin' Our Dues
1967	"Don't Tie Me Down" b/w "Where There's a Will There's a Way to Forget You" (Non-album track); As "Anthony & the Imperials"	Veep 1255	123	—	—	—	Reflections
1967	"Hold on to Someone" b/w "Lost in Love"; As "Anthony & the Imperials"	Veep 1262	—	—	—	—	Reflections
1967	"You Only Live Twice" b/w "My Love Is a Rainbow" (from Reflections); As "Anthony & the Imperials"	Veep 1269	—	—	—	—	Movie Grabbers
1967	"If I Remember to Forget" b/w "Beautiful People" (from The Best of Anthony & the Imperials Volume 2); As "Anthony & the Imperials"	Veep 1275	—	—	—	—	Reflections
1968	"I'm Hypnotized" b/w "Hungry Heart" (from Payin' Our Dues); As "Anthony & the Imperials"	Veep 1278	98	—	—	—	The Best of Anthony & the Imperials Volume 2
1968	"What Greater Love" b/w "In the Back of My Heart"; As "Anthony & the Imperials"	Veep 1283	—	—	—	—	Non-album tracks
1968	"Yesterday Has Gone" b/w "My Love Is a Rainbow"; As "Anthony & the Imperials"	Veep 1285	—	—	—	—	Reflections
1968	"The Flesh Failures (Let the Sunshine In)" b/w "The Gentle Rain" (from Movie Grabbers); As "Anthony & the Imperials"	Veep 1293	—	—	—	—	Non-album tracks
1969	"Anthem (Grow, Grow, Grow)" b/w "Goodbye Goodtimes"; As "Anthony & the Imperials"	Veep 1303	—	—	—	—	Non-album tracks
1969	"Out of Sight, Out of Mind" b/w "Summer's Comin' In"	United Artists 50552	52	38	41	—	Out of Sight, Out of Mind
1969	"The Ten Commandments of Love" b/w "Let the Sunshine In"	United Artists 50598	82	—	—	—	Out of Sight, Out of Mind
1970	"Don't Get Close" b/w "It'll Never Be the Same Again"	United Artists 50625	116	—	95	—	Non-album tracks
1970	"World of Darkness" b/w "The Change"	United Artists 50677	121	—	—	—	Non-album tracks
1970	"Help Me Find a Way (To Say I Love You)" b/w "If I Love You"	United Artists 50720	92	32	—	—	Non-album tracks
1971	"Father, Father" b/w "Each One, Teach One"	Janus 160	—	—	—	—	Non-album tracks
1973	"La La La at the End" b/w "Lazy Susan"	Avco 4614	—	—	—	—	On a New Street
1974	"I'm Falling in Love with You" b/w "What Good Am I Without You"	Avco 4635	86	25	89	—	On a New Street
1974	"I Don't Have to Worry" b/w "Loneliest House on the Block"	Avco 4645	—	—	—	—	On a New Street
1975	"Hold On (Just a Little Bit Longer)" b/w "I've Got to Let You Go (Part 1)"; As "Anthony & the Imperials"	Avco 4651	106	79	—	—	Hold On!
1975	"I'll Be Loving You Sooner or Later" b/w "Young Girl" (from Hold On!); As "Anthony & the Imperials"	Avco 4655	—	—	—	—	Non-album tracks
1976	"Nothing from Nothing" b/w "Running with the Wrong Crowd"	Pure Gold 101	—	—	—	—	Non-album tracks
1977	"Who's Gonna Love Me" b/w "Can You Imagine"; As "The Imperials"	Power Exchange 266	—	—	—	—	Non-album tracks
1978	"Where You Gonna Find Somebody Like Me" b/w "Another Star"; As "The Imperials"	Power Exchange 271	—	—	—	—	Non-album tracks
1978	"Who's Gonna Love Me" b/w "You Better Take Time to Love"; As "The Imperials"	Omni 5501	—	73	—	17	Non-album tracks
1979	"Fast Freddie The Roller Disco King" b/w "I Just Wanna Be Your Lovin' Man"; As "The Imperials"	T.K. Disco 413	—	—	—	—	Non-album tracks
"—" denotes releases that did not chart or were not released in that territory.
