= Sammy Strain =

American R&B vocalist (born 1939)

- Also known as: Sam Strain
- Born: Samuel Strain Jr. December 9, 1939 (age 86); Brooklyn, New York City, U.S.
- Genres: R&B; soul; blues; Doo-wop
- Occupation: Singer
- Instrument: Vocals (tenor)
- Years active: 1956–2004

Samuel Strain Jr. (born December 9, 1939)^{note} is an American retired R&B vocalist, known for his time as a member of Little Anthony and the Imperials (1961–1972; 1992–2004) and The O'Jays (1976–1992).

He holds the unusual distinction of being twice inducted into the Rock and Roll Hall of Fame: in 2005 with the O'Jays and in 2009 with Little Anthony and the Imperials.

== Early life ==
Strain was born to Sammy Strain Sr. and Margaret Mosley in Brooklyn in 1939. He visited the Apollo Theater as a teenager, and dropped out of Alexander Hamilton High School, Brooklyn age 16.

== Career ==
Strain formed The Chips with several friends in 1956. He sang with a tenor voice.

In 1961, Strain joined The Imperials; they were later rejoined by their lead singer, Jerome "Little Anthony" Gourdine, and returned to the group's original name, Little Anthony and the Imperials.

Strain left the group in 1972 and was replaced by their choreographer Harold Jenkins. Strain then shifted to a career in food service, having a restaurant in Los Angeles and did not sing professionally for three years. At the end of that period, he was briefly a member of The Fandangos with Lonnie Cook and Alvin Walker. He also auditioned to be the lead singer for the group Arpeggio.

In 1976, Strain joined the O'Jays as the replacement for original O'Jays member William Powell, who left the group due to illness (colon cancer). Powell died shortly thereafter. In 1992, Strain left the O'Jays and rejoined the Imperials, singing with them until he retired from performing in 2004.

Strain was twice inducted into the Rock and Roll Hall of Fame: in 2005 with the O'Jays and in 2009 with Little Anthony and the Imperials.

== Personal life ==
Strain married the singer Yvonne Fair (now deceased). He is currently married to his second wife, DeBorah, and has two sons, Vincent and Shawn.

== Notes ==
1.Some sources give Strain's year of birth as 1940 or 1941. However, he celebrated his 80th birthday in 2019 and most sources give 1939 as the year of birth, including the detailed biography in Echoes Of The Past magazine.
