= List of big bands =

While the Big Band Era suggests that big bands flourished for a short period, they have been a part of jazz music since their emergence in the 1920s when white concert bands adopted the rhythms and musical forms of small African-American jazz combos. While their place in popular culture dimmed greatly since their heyday in WWII, modern big band has made a resurgence, with the Roy Hargrove Big Band nominated for a Grammy and the Christian McBride Big Band winning a Grammy in 2012.

== A ==
- Ray Anthony & His Orchestra
- Toshiko Akiyoshi – Lew Tabackin Big Band
- Antibalas Afrobeat Orchestra - afrobeat
- Darcy James Argue's Secret Society - jazz, steampunk
- Ariya Astrobeat Arkestra - afrobeat
- Louis Armstrong and His Orchestra

== B ==
- BBC Big Band - jazz
- BBC Northern Dance Orchestra - swing music
- Charlie Barnet Big Band - jazz, swing
- Count Basie Orchestra - jazz, swing
- Beantown Swing Orchestra - swing
- Louie Bellson
- Tex Beneke Orchestra
- Berlin Jazz Orchestra
- Berlin Contemporary Jazz Orchestra – free jazz
- Bill Berry
- Big Band Jazz de México
- The Birdland Big Band - jazz
- Carla Bley Big Band and The Very Big Carla Bley Band – jazz, post bop
- Bohuslän Big Band - jazz
- Rob McConnell's Boss Brass - jazz
- Anthony Braxton's Creative Music Orchestra
- Les Brown and His Band of Renown - swing
- Ray Brown's Great Big Band - jazz
- Brussels Jazz Orchestra - jazz

== C ==
- The Cab Calloway Orchestra
- The Capp-Pierce Juggernaut
- Ralph Carmichael Big Band
- Benny Carter
- Casa Loma Orchestra
- Cherry Poppin' Daddies (revival)
- Chopteeth - afrobeat
- Crescent Super Band - Jazz, Jump Swing, Modern Big Band, Swing Revival, Great American Songbook
- Kenny Clarke/Francy Boland Big Band
- Clayton-Hamilton Jazz Orchestra
- Ray Conniff
- Spade Cooley - jazz, swing
- Coon-Sanders Original Nighthawk Orchestra
- Del Courtney
- Bob Crosby

== D ==
- Dallas Jazz Orchestra
- John Dankworth Big Band - jazz, film music
- Sam Donahue and his orchestra
- Pierre Dørge's New Jungle Orchestra
- The Dorsey Brothers - jazz
- Jimmy Dorsey and His Orchestra
- Tommy Dorsey and His Orchestra
- DR Big Band - jazz
- Eddy Duchin and His Orchestra

== E ==
- Billy Eckstine Orchestra - jazz, swing, bebop
- Ray Eberle and His Orchestra
- Either/Orchestra
- Duke Ellington and His Orchestra - jazz, orchestral jazz, swing
- Les Elgart
- Larry Elgart
- The Don Ellis Orchestra
- Ziggy Elman and His Orchestra
- Gil Evans & His Monday Night Orchestra a.o. – jazz, third stream, fusion jazz

== F ==
- Maynard Ferguson
- Shep Fields and His Rippling Rhythm
- Ralph Flanagan Big Band - jazz
- Bob Florence's Limited Edition
- The Flying Horse Big Band (formerly the UCF Jazz Ensemble I) - jazz, swing, Afro-Cuban jazz, Latin jazz

== G ==
- Michael Gibbs Orchestra
- Jean Goldkette
- Dizzy Gillespie and His Orchestra - jazz, bebop, Afro-Cuban jazz
- Globe Unity Orchestra – free jazz
- Benny Goodman and His Orchestra - jazz, swing
- Gordon Goodwin's Big Phat Band - jazz, swing music rhythm and blues
- George Gruntz Concert Jazz Band
- GRP All-Star Big Band

== H ==
- Lionel Hampton and His Orchestra
- Hard Rubber Orchestra - modern jazz, new compositions, multimedia performances
- Erskine Hawkins
- Ted Heath and his Music - jazz
- Fletcher Henderson and His Orchestra - swing music, jazz
- Matthew Herbert Big Band
- Woody Herman
- Art Hickman
- Mark Hilburn and His Orchestra
- Tiny Hill and the Hilltoppers
- Earl Hines Orchestra - jazz, swing music, Dixieland
- Bill Holman
- Claude Hopkins and His Orchestra - jazz
- Pee Wee Hunt

== I ==
- ICP Orchestra – free jazz, avant-garde jazz
- International Sweethearts of Rhythm - jazz
- Irakere

== J ==
- Illinois Jacquet
- Harry James Big Band - jazz
- Jazz Composer's Orchestra (founded by Carla Bley & Michael Mantler) - avant-garde jazz
- Jazz Orchestra of the Delta
- Gordon Jenkins
- The Thad Jones/Mel Lewis Orchestra
- Buddy Johnson

== K ==
- Sammy Kaye Orchestra
- Hal Kemp Big Band
- Stan Kenton and His Orchestra
- Andy Kirk and His Twelve Clouds of Joy
- Gene Krupa
- Kay Kyser and His Orchestra

== L ==
- James Last Orchestra
- Syd Lawrence Orchestra
- Remy Le Boeuf's Assembly of Shadows
- Charlie Haden's Liberation Music Orchestra - avant-garde jazz, post-bop
- London Jazz Composers' Orchestra
- Loose Tubes – jazz, post-bop
- Joe Loss and His Orchestra
- Jimmie Lunceford and His Orchestra
- Humphrey Lyttelton Band

== M ==
- Machito
- Magic City Jazz Orchestra
- Henry Mancini Orchestra
- Wingy Manone and His Orchestra
- Matteson-Phillips Tubajazz Consort
- McKinney's Cotton Pickers
- Jay McShann
- Glenn Miller Orchestra
- Mills Blue Rhythm Band
- Mingus Big Band
- Bob Mintzer
- Monk'estra — John Beasley
- Buddy Morrow and his Orchestra
- Gerry Mulligan Concert Jazz Band
- David Murray Big Band
- Vaughn Monroe Big Band

== N ==
- Nighthawks Orchestra

== O ==
- King Oliver
- Will Osborne
- Oxford University Jazz Orchestra

== P ==
- Pacific Mambo Orchestra
- Ed Palermo Big Band
- Gloria Parker
- Duke Pearson Big Band - hard bop, soul jazz, smooth jazz, post-bop
- Art Pepper + 11
- Ben Pollack
- Lee Presson and the Nails - jazz, swing music (revival), jump blues, cabaret
- Tito Puente Orchestra

== R ==
- Boyd Raeburn
- The Ramblers
- Don Redman and His Orchestra - jazz
- Alvino Rey Orchestra - swing, jazz, exotica
- Buddy Rich Big Band - jazz
- Edmundo Ros and His Orchestra
- RTV Slovenia Big Band
- Tito Rodriguez Orchestra
- Luis Russell and His Orchestra

== S ==
- Bobby Sanabria Multiverse Big Band
- Sammy Kaye Orchestra
- Sauter-Finegan Orchestra - swing jazz
- Maria Schneider Orchestra
- The Brian Setzer Orchestra - swing music (revival), jump blues
- Artie Shaw and His Orchestra - swing music
- Charlie Spivak
- The Squadronaires

== T ==
- Jack Teagarden and His Orchestra
- Dan Terry Big Big Band - jazz
- Claude Thornhill
- Doc Severinsen and the Tonight Show Band
- The Top Hatters
- Orrin Tucker and His Orchestra
- Tommy Tucker and His Orchestra

== U ==
- Unforgettable Big Band
- Unifour
- University of North Texas One O'Clock Lab Band

== V ==
- The Vanguard Jazz Orchestra
- Charlie Ventura Band - jazz, bebop
- Billy Vaughn Orchestra
- Vienna Art Orchestra - jazz, third stream, folk music
- Tommy Vig Orchestra

== W ==
- Chris Walden Big Band
- Chick Webb and His Orchestra - jazz, swing
- Lawrence Welk
- Dick Willebrandts and His Dance Orchestra - jazz, swing
- Gerald Wilson Orchestra - jazz
- Paul Whiteman
- Widespread Depression Orchestra
- Jaco Pastorius's Word of Mouth Orchestra

== See also ==
- Big band remote
- List of American big band bandleaders
- List of British big band leaders
- List of experimental big bands
- Territory Bands
