= List of American big band bandleaders =

== A ==
- Irving Aaronson (1895–1963)
- Louis Armstrong (1901–1971) (Louis Armstrong and His Orchestra, 1928–1947)
- Toshiko Akiyoshi (born 1929) (Toshiko Akiyoshi – Lew Tabackin Big Band)
- Ray Anthony (born 1922)
- Lil Hardin Armstrong (1898-1971)
- Georgie Auld (1919-1990) (Georgie Auld and His Orchestra, Georgie Auld and His Hollywood All Stars)

== B ==
- Charlie Barnet (1913-1991)
- Count Basie (1904–1984) (Count Basie Orchestra, 1934–1984)
- Louie Bellson (1924-2009)
- Bunny Berigan (1908-1942)
- Carla Bley (1936-2023)
- Will Bradley (1912-1989)
- Les Brown (1912-2001) (Les Brown and His Band of Renown) (1938–2001)

== C ==
- Joe Cabot (1921-2016)
- Cab Calloway (1907–1994) (Cab Calloway Orchestra)
- Frankie Carle (1903-2001)
- Benny Carter (1907-2003)
- Larry Clinton (1909-1985)
- Harry Connick, Jr. (born 1967)
- Hank Crawford (1934-2009)
- Bob Crosby (1913-1993)
- Bob Curnow (born 1941)

== D ==
- Tommy Dorsey (1905–1956) (Dorsey Brothers Orchestra) (1928–1956), Tommy Dorsey Orchestra (1935–1956)
- Jimmy Dorsey (1904–1957) (Dorsey Brothers Orchestra (1928–1956), Jimmy Dorsey and His Orchestra)
- Eddy Duchin (1909–1951) (Eddy Duchin and His Orchestra)

== E ==
- Billy Eckstine (1914-1993)
- Les Elgart (1917-1995)
- Duke Ellington (1899–1974) (Duke Ellington Orchestra)
- Mercer Ellington (1919-1996)
- Don Ellis (1934-1978)
- Ziggy Elman (1914-1968) (Ziggy Elman and His Orchestra)
- Gil Evans (1912–1988)

== F ==
- Maynard Ferguson (1928–2006)
- Jerry Fielding (1922-1980)
- Shep Fields (1910–1981) (Shep Fields and His Rippling Rhythm)
- Brent Fischer (born 1964)
- Bob Florence (1932-2008) (the Limited Edition)

== G ==
- Jan Garber (1897–1977) (Jan Garber Orchestra)
- Terry Gibbs (born 1924)
- Dizzy Gillespie (1917-1993)
- Benny Goodman (1909–1986) (Benny Goodman and His Orchestra, 1932–1952)
- Gordon Goodwin (born 1954) (Big Phat Band)
- Glen Gray (1900-1963) (Casa Loma Orchestra) (1927-1963)
- George Gee (George Gee Swing Orchestra; formerly known as the Make-Believe Ballroom Orchestra)

== H ==
- Henry Halstead (1897–1984)
- Lionel Hampton (1908-2002)
- Slide Hampton (1932-2021) (Slide Hampton Ultra Big Band)
- Erskine Hawkins (1914–1993)
- Horace Heidt (1901-1986)
- Neal Hefti (1922-2008)
- Fletcher Henderson (1897–1952)
- Woody Herman (1913–1987)
- Teddy Hill (1909-1978)
- Tiny Hill (1906-1971)
- Earl Hines (1903-1983)
- Claude Hopkins (1903-1984)
- Pee Wee Hunt (1907-1979)
- Lloyd Hunter (1910-1961)
- Ina Ray Hutton (1916-1984) (Melodears)

== I ==
- Tommy Igoe (born 1964) (The Birdland Big Band)

H

- Harry James (1916–1983)
- Galen Jeter (Dallas Jazz Orchestra)
- Dick Johnson (clarinetist) (1925–2010)
- Isham Jones (1894–1956)
- Quincy Jones (1933–2024)
- Thad Jones (1923–1986) (The Thad Jones/Mel Lewis Orchestra) (c.1965-1977)
- Louis Jordan (1908–1975)

== K ==
- Sammy Kaye (1910–1987)
- Hal Kemp (1904-1940)
- Stan Kenton (1911–1979)
- Wayne King (1901–1985)
- Andy Kirk (1898-1992) (Twelve Clouds of Joy)
- Gene Krupa (1909-1973)
- Tom Kubis (born 1951)
- Kay Kyser (1905–1985)

== L ==
- Kevin Chad Layer (Born 1988)
- Mel Lewis (1929–1990) (The Thad Jones/Mel Lewis Orchestra) (c.1965-1977))
- Ted Lewis (1890–1971)
- Guy Lombardo (1902–1977)
- Johnny Long (1914-1972)
- Vincent Lopez (1896–1975)
- Jimmie Lunceford (1902–1947)

== M ==
- Rob McConnell (1935-2010) (the Boss Brass)
- Ray McKinley (1910-1995)
- Hal McIntyre (1914-1959)
- Richard Maltby (1914-1991)
- Gap Mangione (born 1938)
- Ralph Marterie (1914-1978)
- Freddy Martin (1906-1983)
- Frankie Masters (1904–1991)
- Billy May (1916–2004)
- Glenn Miller (1904–1944) (Glenn Miller Orchestra, 1937–1942)
- Lucky Millinder (1900–1966)
- Charles Mingus (1922-1979)
- Bob Mintzer (born 1953) (Bob Mintzer Big Band)
- Vaughn Monroe (1911–1973)
- Russ Morgan (1904–1969)
- Bennie Moten (1894-1935) (Kansas City Orchestra)
- Gerry Mulligan (1927-1996) (Concert Jazz Band)

== N ==
- Ray Nance (1913-1976)
- Ozzie Nelson (1906-1975)
- Red Nichols (1905–1965)
- Ray Noble (1903–1978)
- Red Norvo (1908-1999)

== O ==
- Joe "King" Oliver (1885–1938)
- Kid Ory (1886–1973)

== P ==
- Tony Pastor (1907–1969)
- George Paxton (1914-1989)
- Fats Pichon (1906–1967)
- Ben Pollack (1903–1971)
- Perez Prado (1916-1989)
- Louis Prima (1910-1978)
- Paul Whiteman (1880-1967)

== R ==
- Boyd Raeburn (1913-1966)
- Ray Reach (born 1948)
- Don Redman (1900–1964) (Don Redman Orchestra, 1931–1940)
- Alvino Rey (1908-2004)
- Buddy Rich (1917–1987) (Buddy Rich Big Band)
- Nelson Riddle (1921–1985)
- Shorty Rogers (1924-1994) (Shorty Rogers and His Giants)

== S ==
- Sauter-Finegan Orchestra led by Eddie Sauter (1914-1981) and Bill Finegan (1917-2008)
- Jan Savitt (1907-1948) (Jan Savitt & His Top Hatters, the Jan Savitt String Orchestra, Jan Savitt & His Orchestra)
- Maria Schneider (born 1960) (Maria Schneider Orchestra)
- Vic Schoen (1916-2000) (The Vic Schoen Orchestra)
- Raymond Scott (1908-1994)
- Ben Selvin (1898–1980)
- Brian Setzer (born 1959) (The Brian Setzer Orchestra)
- Artie Shaw (1910–2004)
- Tom Smith (born 1957) (Unifour Jazz Ensemble)
- John Philip Sousa (1858-1932)
- Charlie Spivak (1905/07- 1982)
- Sun Ra (1914–1993)

== T ==
- Lew Tabackin (born 1940)
- Jack Teagarden (1905–1964) (Jack Teagarden and His Orchestra, 1939–1946)
- Dan Terry (1924-2011)
- Claude Thornhill (1908-1965)
- Orrin Tucker (1911-2011) (Orrin Tucker and his Orchestra)
- Tommy Tucker (1903-1989) (Tommy Tucker and his Orchestra)

== V ==
- Rudy Vallee (1901-1986) (The Connecticut Yankees)
- Charlie Ventura (1916-1992)
- Tommy Vig (born 1938)

== W ==
- Fred Waring (1900–1984) (Waring's Pennsylvanians)
- Chick Webb (1905–1939)
- Ted Weems (1901–1963)
- Lawrence Welk (1903–1992)
- Paul Weston (1912–1996)
- Paul Whiteman (1890–1967)
- Gerald Wilson (1918-2014)
- Anna Mae Winburn (1913-1999)

== Z ==
- Si Zentner (1917-2000)

== See also ==
- Big band remote
- List of big bands
