= Alabama Jazz Hall of Fame All-Stars =

The Alabama Jazz Hall of Fame All-Stars (AJHoF All-Stars) is a working jazz ensemble, featuring some of the finest jazz musicians Alabama has to offer. This group is the faculty of the Jazz Education Department of the Alabama Jazz Hall of Fame and the faculty of the Fun With Jazz Educational Program, begun through the Alys Stephens Center (2006), and now administered by the Alabama Jazz Hall of Fame (2007). Through these educational programs, the AJHoF Allstars, directed by Ray Reach, seek to fulfill a mission "...to foster, encourage, educate, and cultivate a general appreciation of the medium of jazz music as a legitimate, original and distinctive art form indigenous to America. Its mission is also to preserve a continued and sustained program of illuminating the contribution of the State of Alabama through its citizens, environment, demographics and lore, and perpetuating the heritage of jazz music" (excerpt from the mission statement of the Alabama Jazz Hall of Fame).

The AJHoF All-Stars perform at schools, civic events and jazz festivals throughout the southeast. The members of the AJHoF All-Stars also participate in numerous other active performing groups, including the Magic City Jazz Orchestra, the Night Flight Big Band, Ray Reach and Friends and Cleveland Eaton and the Alabama All-Stars.
