= Steve Sample Sr. =

American bandleader (died 2020)

Steve Sample Sr. (19 December 1930 – 22 August 2020) was a bandleader, arranger, composer and jazz educator. For more than 30 years, Sample was a professor in the Music Department of the University of Alabama, where he directed the Jazz Ensembles and taught music theory, arranging and jazz related courses. Sample trained many notable jazz musicians during his long tenure at Alabama, including Gary Wheat, Birch Johnson, Kelley O'Neal, Chris Gordon, Mervyn Warren, Cedric Dent, Beth Gottlieb, Mart Avant, and Dick Aven. On September 26, 2008, Sample was inducted into the Alabama Jazz Hall of Fame for his contributions to jazz education.

== Early years ==
Sample began playing and arranging professionally with traveling road bands in 1948, after graduating from University High School, Normal, Illinois. He traveled with various road bands until he enlisted in the Air Force in January 1951. From 1951 until January 1955, he played in and wrote arrangements for the 542nd USAF Band at Craig Air Force Base in Selma, Alabama.

He enrolled at the University of Alabama in January 1955 and received his bachelor's degree in 1958. Sample joined the music faculty in September, 1958, and continued to work on his master's degree, receiving it in June, 1962.

== Years on faculty at the University of Alabama ==
While on the Theory/Composition faculty at Alabama, he taught Theory I, II and III, 16th and 18th Century Counterpoint, Form and Analysis and Orchestration. He served as staff arranger for University of Alabama concert and marching bands from 1955 to 1973. In 1967, he organized the University of Alabama Jazz Ensembles and later organized the Bachelor’s and master's degree programs in Arranging. In these programs, he designed the curriculum for and taught classes in Arranging, Advanced Arranging, Studio Orchestration, Jazz-Pop-Rock Composition and Music Calligraphy.

== Work as arranger ==
Professor Sample served nationally at jazz festivals and competitions as a judge, clinician and director. His arrangements have been, and still are, being performed by high school, college and professional jazz bands, marching bands, symphony orchestras, tuba/euphonium ensembles, choral groups, the Los Angeles Flute Orchestra, the SuperJazz Big Band, the Dallas Jazz Orchestra and various vocalists and soloists.

== Other professional activities ==
Other professional activities included teaching and directing at the Stan Kenton Summer Jazz Band Camps, serving on the U.S. College All-Star Jazz Band Advisory Board and two terms as Alabama State President of the National Association of Jazz Educators. While attending the Arranger’s Workshop at the Eastman School of Music in the summer of 1974, he was selected to write a feature arrangement for Stan Getz, tenor saxophonist. In 1982 and 1986 he took jazz combos on tour in Guatemala and Costa Rica. In May 1986, he took the University of Alabama Jazz Ensemble to Disney World for three days of performing.

During the course of his tenure at the University of Alabama, he and the UA Jazz Ensemble worked with such stars as Bob Hope, Dave Brubeck, Jim Nabors, Vic Damone and Joan Rivers plus jazz greats Maynard Ferguson, Dizzy Gillespie, Dee Barton, Bill Watrous, Urbie Green, Alan Vizutti, Gene Bertoncini and Rich Matteson. The Jazz Ensembles won and/or participated in local and regional jazz festivals including Tallahassee, Florida, Memphis, Tennessee, Atlanta, Georgia and Mobile, Alabama. The UA Jazz Ensemble also traveled to and performed at the Wichita and the Notre Dame Jazz festivals.

== Notable students ==
- Cedric Dent, member of the jazz vocal group Take 6; received master's degree in Arranging with Sample
- Birch Johnson, top New York City trombonist; played with the Woody Herman Band, the Tommy Dorsey Band and the Blues Brothers
- Ray Reach, pianist, singer, arranger and teacher at the University of Alabama at Birmingham (UAB) (1998-2005); currently Director of Student Jazz Programs at the Alabama Jazz Hall of Fame; was Sample's first graduate assistant at the University of Alabama; has produced and recorded with many notable jazz players, including Lou Marini, Lew Soloff, Ellis Marsalis and Eric Essix
- Chuck Tilley, drummer; has toured with Lee Greenwood, Engelbert Humperdinck, Dolly Parton and Alabama (band); now a member of the group Sixwire
- Mervyn Warren, member of the jazz vocal group Take 6; received master's degree in Arranging with Sample

== Publications ==
In 1982, Sample wrote the textbook An Approach to Mainstream Jazz and Pop Harmony. He has published both original compositions and arrangements with the Dallas Jazz Orchestra (now known as Dallas' Original Jazz Orchestra). In addition, he has published a string orchestra arrangement of "Silent Night" with Belwin Publishers. After retiring, he continued to send arrangements to the SuperJazz Big Band in Birmingham, Alabama. He has written for the Los Angeles Resonance Flute Consortium and the trombone section of the Los Angeles Philharmonic Orchestra.

Sample became acquainted with the FINALE music software program in 1988 and became adept with its writing and printing aspects, as an early adopter in using a Macintosh computer.

== Recordings featuring Steve Sample's arrangements ==
- UAB SuperJazz, Featuring Ellis Marsalis, produced by Ray Reach and Henry Panion (2001)
- Big 30, Galen Jeter and Dallas' Original Jazz Orchestra (2004)
- Messin' With Texas, Galen Jeter and Dallas' Original Jazz Orchestra (2006)
- Big Band Theory, Bethany Smith Staelens (2008)
