= UAB SuperJazz, Featuring Ellis Marsalis =

UAB SuperJazz, featuring Ellis Marsalis

Live album by SuperJazz Big Band with Ellis Marsalis
- Released: 2001
- Recorded: 2001 at the Alys Stephens Center
- Genre: Big band
- Length: 61:09
- Label: UAB Entertainment
- Producer: Henry Panion and Ray Reach

UAB SuperJazz, Featuring Ellis Marsalis is a CD, recorded in 2001 by the SuperJazz Big Band (formerly "UAB SuperJazz") of Birmingham, Alabama with guest piano soloist Ellis Marsalis. The recording, produced by University of Alabama at Birmingham (UAB) faculty members Ray Reach and Henry Panion, is a compilation of musical selections recorded in concert at the Alys Stephens Center on the campus of UAB. The album was mixed at the UAB Recording Studio. Recording engineers for the project were Blake English and James Bevelle. Remix engineers were James Bevelle and Ray Reach.

The CD was originally released on the UAB Entertainment label, a company which was founded by Henry Panion. The musical selections on the CD represent a variety of big band (jazz orchestra) arrangements, some done by well-known big band arrangers, and others done by members of the SuperJazz Big Band, including the band's founding director Dr. Everett Lawler, saxophonist Neil McLean, trombonist Charles Ard, pianist / vocalist Ray Reach, and noted jazz educator Steve Sample, Sr.

== History of SuperJazz ==
The SuperJazz Big Band was the first performing ensemble connected with the University of Alabama at Birmingham Music Department, but is no longer affiliated with UAB. SuperJazz was later affiliated with Samford University. The group now presents four concerts per year at John Carroll Catholic High School in Birmingham, Alabama. The SuperJazz Big Band has spawned spin-off groups, including the Magic City Jazz Orchestra and the Night Flight Big Band. (For more about the history of SuperJazz, see the Magic City Jazz Orchestra page.)

== Collector's item status ==
This CD, due to its rarity, has achieved collector's item status, selling for as much as $100.00 per copy on such websites as Amazon.com.

== Track listing ==
1. "I Remember You" - Composed by Johnny Mercer and Victor Schertzinger / Arr. by Bill Holman
2. "The Very Thought of You" - Comp. by Ray Noble / Arr. by Everett Lawler
3. "The Night Has a Thousand Eyes" - composed by Jerome (Jerry) Brainin and Buddy Bernier for the 1948 film Night Has a Thousand Eyes / Arr. by Charles Ard
4. "Makin' Whoopee" - Comp. by Gus Kahn / Arr. by Charles Ard
5. "The Thrill Is Gone" - Comp. by Brown and Henderson / Arr. by Steve Sample
6. "Sometimes I'm Happy" - Comp. by Vincent Youmans / Arr. by Steve Sample
7. "Hello, Young Lovers" - Comp. by Rodgers and Hammerstein / Arr. by Steve Sample
8. "I'm Beginning to See the Light" - Comp. by Duke Ellington / Arr. by Charles Ard
9. "How Do You Keep the Music Playing?" - Comp. by Michel Legrand and Marilyn and Alan Bergman / Arr. by Ray Reach
10. "The Song Is You" - Comp. by Jerome Kern and Oscar Hammerstein / Arr. by Everett Lawler

Selections featuring Ellis Marsalis:

1. "After Hours" - Comp. by Avery Parrish / Arr. transcribed by Neil McLean
2. "Tin Roof Blues" - Comp. by Paul Mares, Ben Pollack, Mel Stitzel, George Brunies and Leon Roppolo / Arr. by Everett Lawler
3. "How Insensitive" - Comp. by Antônio Carlos Jobim / Arr. by Ray Reach
4. "It Don't Mean a Thing (If It Ain't Got That Swing)" - Comp. by Duke Ellington / Arr. by Charles Ard
5. "One O'Clock Jump" - Comp. by Count Basie / Arr. transcribed by Neil McLean

== SuperJazz Big Band members ==
- Trumpets: Craig Konicek, John Taylor, Bo Berry, Darryl Jones, Harry McAfee, Mallory Pierce
- Trombones: Charles Ard, Bob Black, Mark Foster, Jim Henderson, Mike Lingo, Edson Worden
- Saxophones: Mike Lyle, Claude Hughes, Ken Carroll, Dave Amaral, Grady Chandler, Neil McLean, Sallie White
- Rhythm: Sonny Harris (drums), Chris Wendle (bass), Lester Alexander (guitar), Carlos Pino (guitar), Ray Reach (piano)
- Vocals: Ray Reach

== External links and references ==
- Ray Reach - Official Website
- SuperJazz Big Band at AllAboutJazz.com
- SuperJazz Big Band at MySpace.com
- Review of SuperJazz performance at 2009 City Stages festival
- UAB SuperJazz, Featuring Ellis Marsalis at Amazon.com
- Review of CD, "UAB SuperJazz, Featuring Ellis Marsalis," at AllAboutJazz.com
