= Sometimes I'm Happy (Sometimes I'm Blue) =

Song by Charles King & Louise Groody
- Published: 1927 by Harms Inc.
- Composer: Vincent Youmans
- Lyricist: Irving Caesar

"Sometimes I'm Happy" is a popular song. The music was written by Vincent Youmans, the lyrics by Irving Caesar. The song was originally published in 1923 under the title "Come On And Pet Me" with lyrics by Oscar Hammerstein II and William Cary Duncan.

== Background ==
It was originally intended for the Broadway musical Mary Jane McKane, but was cut before the show opened. The music was subsequently used, with new lyrics and title, in the short-lived 1925 musical A Night Out, and in the musical Hit the Deck, starring Stanley Holloway and opening in April 1927.

The song was performed in Hit the Deck by Charles King and Louise Groody, who also made a recording for Victor Records, catalog number 20609. The best-selling versions were by King and Groody and by Roger Wolfe Kahn (with vocal by Franklyn Baur), also issued by Victor (catalog number 20599). Two other versions, a duet by Baur and Gladys Rice on Columbia Records (catalog number 998-D) and a vocal by Vaughn De Leath on Brunswick Records (catalog number 3608) also had a significant degree of popularity.

A number of other recordings was made in 1927 (see below), and the tune has become a standard, recorded by many artists since that time. It appeared as the B-side of the landmark 1935 recording of "King Porter Stomp" by Benny Goodman and his orchestra (released July 31 as Victor 25090).

== Lyrics (Come On And Pet Me version) ==
There's a girl friend that I know
Has a boy friend who is slow
When they're alone he is shy,
And she has to keep complaining:
Come on and pet me, why don't you pet me?
Why don't you get me to let you pet me?
You never ask me out for a spoon
For all I know, there ain't any moon!
I'd like to bask in your fond caressin'
You do the askin' I'll do the yessin'
Within your arms I'd stay for a year
Come on and pet me, dear, do dear!

== Lyrics (Sometimes I'm Happy version) ==
Sometimes I'm happy, sometimes I'm blue
My disposition depends on you
I never mind the rain from the sky
If I can find the sun in your eyes
Sometimes I love you, sometimes I hate you
But when I hate you, it's 'cause I love you
That's how I am
So what can I do?
I'm happy when I'm with you
Sometimes I'm happy, sometimes I'm blue
My disposition depends on you
I never mind the rain from the sky
If I can find the sun in your eyes
Sometimes I love you, sometimes I hate you
But when I hate you, it's 'cause I love you
That's how I am
So what can I do?
I'm always happy
So very happy
I'm always happy when I'm with you

== Recorded versions ==
- Steve Allen
- Ray Anthony
- Victor Arden and the Phil Ohman Orchestra (recorded April 8, 1927; released by Brunswick Records as catalog number 3527B, with the flip side "Hallelujah"; also released by Vocalion Records under the name Jay's Chelsea Orchestra as catalog number 15591, with the flip side "Me and My Shadow")
- Mildred Bailey (recorded March 14, 1941; released by Decca Records as catalog number 3755B; re-released by Decca as catalog number 27918 in early 1952, both with the flip side "Rockin' Chair")
- Count Basie
- Tony Bennett
- Bunny Berigan
- Les Brown
- Pete Brown (recorded May 5, 1959 on Verve Records album From The Heart)
- Dave Brubeck/Paul Desmond
- Ray Bryant
- Betty Carter
- Al Casey's Sextet (recorded January 19, 1945, released by Capitol Records as catalog number 10034, with the flip side "How High the Moon")
- Arnett Cobb
- Nat King Cole
- Eddie Condon
- Ray Conniff
- Jill Corey
- Willie Creager's Rhythm Aces (vocal by the Locust Sisters; recorded April 30, 1927; released by Supertone Records as catalog number 9606; also released under the name Georgia Collegians by Champion Records as catalog numbers CH15325 and 15910, by Gennett Records as catalog numbers 6138 and 7090, and by Silvertone Records as catalog number 5051 all with the flip side "Hallelujah")
- Bing Crosby recorded the song in 1956 for use on his radio show and it was subsequently included in the box set The Bing Crosby CBS Radio Recordings (1954-56) issued by Mosaic Records (catalog MD7-245) in 2009.
- Vic Damone
- Doris Day with The Mellowmen (recorded May, 1949; released by Columbia Records as catalog number 38545, with the flip side "You Go to My Head")
- Vaughn De Leath (recorded July 1927; released by Brunswick Records as catalog number 3608, with the flip side "Baby Feet Go Pitter Patter ('Cross My Floor)"; also released by Vocalion Records as catalog number 15597B, both with the flip side "Me and My Shadow")
- Liz Diamond
- The Dinning Sisters
- Eddy Duchin (in a medley with Pretty Baby; recorded July 15, 1942, released by Columbia Records as catalog number 36746, with the flip side "Blue Room"/"Am I Blue?")
- Roy Eldridge
- Seger Ellis and his orchestra (recorded March 11, 1937, released by Decca Records as catalog number 1350, with the flip side "Bee's Knees")
- Gil Evans
- Robert Farnon
- Frances Faye (released by Capitol Records as catalog number 2472, with the flip side "I Was Wrong About You")
- The Four Freshmen - Four Freshmen and Five Saxes
- Erroll Garner (recorded December 5, 1945, released by Mercury Records as catalog number 1002, with the flip side "Always")
- Stan Getz
- Dizzy Gillespie
- Benny Goodman & his orchestra (Instrumental) (recorded July 1, 1935; released by Victor Records as catalog number 25090B, with the flip side "King Porter Stomp"). A recording can also be found on The Famous 1938 Carnegie Hall Jazz Concert.
- Stéphane Grappelli
- Glen Gray & The Casa Loma Orchestra (1939)
- Walter Gross (released by MGM Records as catalog number 30465, with the flip side "Time on My Hands (You in My Arms)" and by Musicraft Records as catalog number 387, with the flip side "More Than You Know")
- Scott Hamilton
- Johnny Hartman
- Ted Heath
- Bill Henderson
- Hildegarde
- Earl Hines
- Milt Hinton
- Nick Holder
- Billie Holiday
- Stanley Holloway - The first artist to sing the song for the play "Hit the Deck" in 1927
- Honeydreamers (released by Capitol Records as catalog number 2857, with the flip side "Perdido")
- Lena Horne with Luther Henderson (recorded 1947; released by MGM Records as catalog number 10246, with the flip side "It's Mad, Mad, Mad", and as catalog number 30398, with the flip side "I've Got the World on a String")
- Alberta Hunter
- Milt Jackson
- Hank Jones
- Louis Jordan
- The Jo-Vals (released by Laurie Records as catalog number 3229, with the flip side "You You My Love")
- Roger Wolfe Kahn & His Orchestra (vocal by Franklyn Baur; recorded April 14, 1927; released by Victor Records as catalog number 20599A, with the flip side "Hallelujah")
- Sammy Kaye & his orchestra (vocal: Tommy Ryan) (recorded September 3, 1937; released by Vocalion Records as catalog number 3909, with the flip side "Indiana"; re-released in 1949 by Harmony Records as catalog number Ha1041, with the flip side "Let Me Call You Sweetheart")
- Charles King and Louise Groody (Broadway Production; recorded April 12, 1927; released by Victor Records as catalog number 20609, with the flip side "Hallelujah")
- Kathy Kirby (for her 1965 album Make Someone Happy)
- Lee Konitz
- Andre Kostelanetz
- Gene Krupa
- Cleo Laine
- Frankie Laine
- Peggy Lee
- Jerry Lewis
- Susannah McCorkle
- The McGuire Sisters (1956)
- Carmen McRae (1955)
- Joni Mitchell
- National Music Lover Dance Orchestra (released by National Music Lovers Records as catalog number 1208, with the flip side "How Can a Girl Like You Like a Boy Like Me?")
- Phineas Newborn Jr.
- Jack Oakie & Polly Walker (featured in the film Hit the Deck) (1930)
- Anita O'Day, with the Alvy West Band (released by Signature Records as catalog number 15127B, with the flip side "Ace in the Hole"; also shown as Anita O'Day with the Little Band, released by Signature Records as catalog number 15222B, with the flip side "Bewitched")
- Oscar Peterson
- John Pizzarelli "The John Pizzarelli Trio", (After Hours) (1996)
- The Platters
- King Pleasure
- Bud Powell
- Jane Powell (featured in the film Hit the Deck) (1955; released by MGM Records as catalog number 30879, with the flip side "Hallelujah")
- Della Reese
- Django Reinhardt
- Gladys Rice (shown in as William Rice) and Franklyn Baur (released by Columbia Records as catalog number 998-D)
- Willard Robison and his orchestra (recorded June 1927, released by Pathé Records as catalog number 32274 and by Perfect Records as catalog number 12353, both with the flip side "Lazy Weather")
- Shirley Scott
- Don Shirley
- Six Hottentots (recorded March 23, 1927; released by Banner Records as catalog number 6008, with the flip side "Sugar")
- Dinah Shore
- Johnny Smith
- Southampton Society Orchestra (released by Pathé Records as catalog number 36643, with the flip side "I'm in Love Again")
- Jo Stafford (released by Capitol Records as catalog number 993, with the flip side "Why Can't You Behave?" and as catalog number 20051, with the flip side "Carry Me Back to Old Virginny"), Autumn in New York (1950)
- Sun Ra
- The SuperJazz Big Band of Birmingham, Alabama recorded the song on the CD, UAB SuperJazz, Featuring Ellis Marsalis
- Claude Thornhill
- The Three Sounds
- Trenier Twins (recorded December 1947, released by Mercury Records as catalog number 8089, with the flip side "Cadillac Convertible")
- Trotta (released by Discovery Records as catalog number 159, with the flip side "Night Must Fall")
- Sarah Vaughan (1955)
- Cy Walter (released by Columbia Records as catalog number 39629, with the flip side "Isn't It Romantic?")
- Dinah Washington for her album In the Land of Hi-Fi (1956).
- Ben Webster
- Margaret Whiting
- Jean Wiener & Clément Doucet (recorded 1928; released by Columbia Records as catalog number D13035, with the flip side "Hallelujah!")
- Lee Wiley (recorded 1951; released by Columbia Records as catalog number 39801, with the flip side "Keepin' Myself For You")
- Joe Williams
- Nancy Wilson (1959)
- Teddy Wilson
- Lester Young Quartet (recorded December 28, 1943, released by Mercury Records as catalog number 1093, with the flip side "Afternoon of a Basie-ite")
- UAB SuperJazz, Featuring Ellis Marsalis, arrangement by Steve Sample Sr.
- Sarah Vaughan on her live album Sassy Swings The Tivoli produced by Quincy Jones (1963)
