= The Pollyanna Syncopators =

The Pollyanna Syncopators was an all-girl jazz band active in the 1920s in the United States. The group was organized in 1923 by Ruth Randall in Lincoln, Nebraska, and traveled the US, playing in ballrooms and theaters from the east coast to California. Around 1925, they filmed and then released a Phonofilm. In 1926 white female trombonist Velzoe Brown joined the band. The economic pressures caused by the Great Depression forced the band to break-up.
