= Johnny O'Neal =

American jazz pianist and vocalist (born 1956)

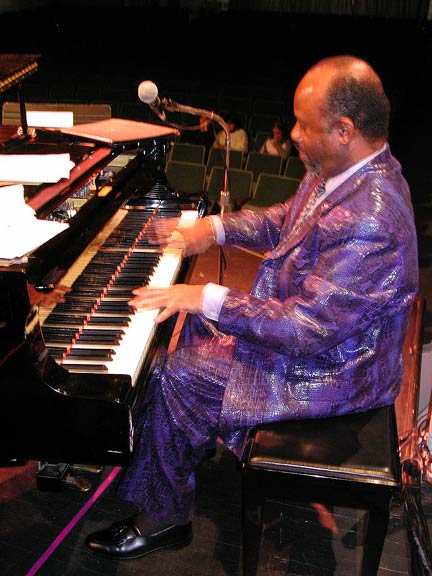
- O'Neal with the SuperJazz Big Band of Birmingham, Alabama. (Photo by Ray Reach)

Background information
- Born: Johnny O'Neal; October 10, 1956 (age 69)
- Origin: Detroit, Michigan, United States
- Genres: Jazz, R & B, gospel
- Occupation: Musician
- Instruments: Piano, Vibes, vocals
- Labels: Concord Jazz, Parkwood, Justin Time, Jazzabel

Johnny O'Neal (born October 10, 1956 in Detroit, Michigan) is an American neo-bop jazz pianist and vocalist. His playing ranges from the technically virtuosic to the tenderest of ballad interpretations. Though unique in style, he is influenced by many jazz elders, including Oscar Peterson and Art Tatum. He has led many recording dates with musicians such as Russell Malone and many others. He was a 1997 inductee of the Alabama Jazz Hall of Fame.

== Life and career ==
In 1974, O'Neal moved to Birmingham, Alabama, where he worked as a full-time musician. In Birmingham he worked with local jazz musicians, such as Jerry Grundhofer, Dave Amaral, Cleveland Eaton, and Ray Reach. He moved to New York City to perform with Clark Terry in 1981, and also landed a regular job at the Blue Note, accompanying such musicians as Dizzy Gillespie, Ray Brown, Nancy Wilson, Joe Pass and Kenny Burrell. He was a member of Art Blakey and the Jazz Messengers for two years from 1982 to 1983 and made his Carnegie Hall debut in 1985.

On the recommendation of Oscar Peterson, O'Neal portrayed Art Tatum in the 2004 movie Ray, recreating Tatum's sound on the song "Yesterdays".

A 2006 DVD Tight, captured O'Neal at the height of his powers. Included is an interview with pianist Mulgrew Miller, who stated,

In my generation of musicians there are two who are probably the most naturally talented. They both happen to be from Detroit. One is Kenny Garrett, the well-known saxophonist. The other is pianist Johnny O'Neal.

== Playing style ==
"There are so many outstanding things about Johnny's playing. Two or three of the most outstanding: number one, the touch. Johnny has a million dollar touch. Very few people touch the piano like that to get that kind of sound and feeling ... The other thing is his feeling of swing, which is so natural."

On June 10 and 11, 2016 O'Neal was featured in "Lush Life: Celebrating Billy Strayhorn," performing with the Jazz at Lincoln Center Orchestra. He received a standing ovation.

== Discography ==
As leader/co-leader

- 1983: Coming Out (Concord Jazz)
- 1985: Soulful Swinging (Parkwood)
- 1985: Live at Baker's Keyboard Lounge (Parkwood)
- 1995: On the Montreal Scene (Justin Time)
- 2002: In Good Hands (Jazzabel)
- 2013: Live at Smalls (Smalls Live, 2014)
- 2017: In The Moment with Roy Hargrove, Grant Stewart, Ben Rubens, Itay Morchi (Smoke Sessions, 2017)

As sideman

- Art Blakey, Oh-By the Way (Timeless, 1982)
