= Lou's Blues =

Studio album by Lou Marini and the Magic City Jazz Orchestra (MCJO)
- Released: 2001
- Recorded: 1999 & 2000, Bates Brothers Recording, Hueytown, Alabama
- Genre: Big Band
- Length: 46:08
- Label: Chase Music Group
- Producer: Lou Marini and Ray Reach

Lou Marini and the Magic City Jazz Orchestra (MCJO) chronology
Lou's Blues (2001)	Live at Workplay - Lew Soloff and the Magic City Jazz Orchestra (2009)

Professional ratings
Review scores
Source	Rating
AllAboutJazz.com	

Lou's Blues is a big band jazz album by saxophonist Lou Marini and the Magic City Jazz Orchestra (MCJO), his first recording as a bandleader. The album was recorded at Bates Brothers Recording in Hueytown, Alabama (near Birmingham, Alabama). Lou Marini is best known as a member of several noted bands, including Blood, Sweat and Tears, Steely Dan, the Woody Herman Orchestra, the Buddy Rich Band, The Maureen McGovern Band, the James Taylor Band, the Saturday Night Live Band, Aerosmith, Stevie Wonder and the Blues Brothers Band. Production duties for the album were shared by Lou Marini and Birmingham, Alabama based jazz musician Ray Reach.

All of the arrangements on this CD were written by Lou Marini, and all the compositions are his, except for "Mr. Clean," which was composed by Weldon Irvine. Some of the charts on this album have become enduring favorites of the Lab Bands at the University of North Texas. Liner notes for the CD were written by Bob Belden, an award-winning musician and composer.

== Track listing ==
1. "Lou's Blues"
2. "Looking With New Eyes"
3. "Hip Pickles"
4. "Odalisk"
5. "Mr. Clean"
6. "Song For John"
7. "Dangerous Cargo"
8. "Rena / Country"

== Magic City Jazz Orchestra (MCJO) Personnel ==
The MCJO personnel for Lou's Blues included:

- MCJO Founding Director: Ray Reach
- Woodwinds: Gary Hallquist, Gary Wheat, Neil McLean, Grady Chandler, Daniel Western and Kim Bain
- Trumpets: Mart Avant, Chris Gordon, John Taylor, Craig Konicek, Bo Berry and Darryl Jones
- Trombones: Steve Pryor, Edson Worden, Dr. Bob Black, Charles Ard, and Jim Moeller
