= Fun with Jazz Educational Program =

The "Fun With Jazz" Educational Program is a program of jazz educational concerts and demonstrations developed by Ray Reach and sponsored by the Alabama Jazz Hall of Fame.

== History ==
Starting in 2006, originally sponsored by the Alys Stephens Center at the University of Alabama at Birmingham, Reach and the Alabama Jazz Hall of Fame All-Stars have presented free one-hour lessons introducing jazz at schools, colleges and other institutions.

The program offers four basic presentations, any of which are customizable to fit a particular need. The Fun With Jazz program began at the Alys Stephens Center as part of the ASC Kid's Club series. The first show was presented on February 19, 2006. The show was a resounding success, prompting discussions about "...taking the show on the road..." out to schools and other organizations. Thus, the Fun With Jazz program was born.

== The four presentations ==
- Fun with Jazz I presents the basic history of jazz, an explanation of improvisation, a demonstration of the various jazz instruments, and a discussion of notable musicians and more.
- Fun with Jazz II, The Musicians presents a more detailed discussion of some of the most important musicians from the long history of jazz.
- Fun with Jazz III, Jazz Today covers the influence of jazz in contemporary culture music and discusses the lives and careers of modern musicians and vocalists who are influenced by jazz.
- Fun with Jazz IV, Workshops on Jazz Styles and Improvisational Techniques is presented in the form of a one- or two-day intensive workshop. The workshop covers jazz performance and improvisation techniques and is presented to jazz ensembles in middle school, high school and college and universities.

== Faculty ==
The Fun With Jazz program is taught by the faculty of the Alabama Jazz Hall of Fame known collectively as the Alabama Jazz Hall of Fame All-Stars. The roster of musicians includes:

- Founding director/pianist: Ray Reach
- Trumpets: Tommy Stewart, Omari Thomas, Bo Berry
- Trombone: Chad Fisher, Billy Bargetzi
- Woodwinds: Gary Wheat, Dave Amaral, Dave Miller
- Guitar: Carlos Pino
- Bass: Cleveland Eaton, Abe Becker, Chris Wendle, Robert Dickson
- Drums: Steve Ramos, John Nuckols, Sonny Harris
