= Neil McLean (saxophonist) =

American musician

Neil McLean is an American saxophonist now residing in Tyler, Texas. As a member of the Henry Kimbrell Group, Ray Reach and Friends, the SuperJazz Big Band and the Magic City Jazz Orchestra, he worked with numerous notable performers, including Dionne Warwick, Ella Fitzgerald, Ernie Watts, Lou Marini, Ellis Marsalis and many others. For many years, while residing in Birmingham, Alabama, Neil established himself as one of the premier saxophonists in the Southeast. His arrangements for the SuperJazz Big Band are among the finest performed by that venerable ensemble.

McLean was inducted into the Alabama Jazz Hall of Fame in 1983.

== Selected discography ==
- Ray Reach and Friends. "Especially For You" (1994). Jazz quartet. Available at CDBaby.com.
- Ellis Marsalis and the SuperJazz Big Band. "UAB SuperJazz, featuring Ellis Marsalis" (2001) (Co-produced by Ray Reach and Henry Panion), recorded at the Alys Stephens Center.
- Lou Marini and the Magic City Jazz Orchestra. "Lou's Blues" (2003) (Co-produced by Lou Marini and Ray Reach)
