= Velzoe Brown =

American jazz pianist and trombonist (1910–2011)

Velzoe Brown (March 1, 1910 – May 4, 2011) was an American jazz pianist and trombonist.

== Early life ==
Brown was raised in Nebraska to parents who were musicians; her mother a pianist and her father played trumpet. She was one of five children and learned to play piano without lessons. At the age of 13 she started to play trombone, using an instruction book to guide her. She was the first chair in Omaha Tech High School's marching band.

== Career ==
At age 16 she joined the all-women traveling jazz band The Pollyanna Syncopators, and they played from New York to San Francisco throughout the 1920s. After the group disbanded due to The Great Depression, Brown moved to California, playing with the Juanita Connors band.

She moved to Santa Cruz, California in 1960 and lived there for over 50 years. Until 2010 she performed with her quintet, Velzoe Brown and The Upbeats.

== Personal life and death ==
Brown never married or had children.

She died at the age of 101 in Santa Cruz, California.
