= The Night Has a Thousand Eyes (jazz standard) =

"The Night Has a Thousand Eyes" is a song composed by Jerry Brainin, with lyrics by Buddy Bernier. The song was written for and performed in the 1948 film Night Has a Thousand Eyes. The song has also been recorded by a number of artists since its introduction, including John Coltrane, Sonny Rollins, Horace Silver, UAB SuperJazz (featuring Ellis Marsalis), Harry Belafonte, Paul Desmond (with Jim Hall), Toshiko Akiyoshi, Pharoah Sanders, Freddie Hubbard, Irene Kral, Harry Beckett, Petula Clark, Gloria Lynne, and Carmen McRae.
