= Jazz band =

Musical ensemble that plays jazz music

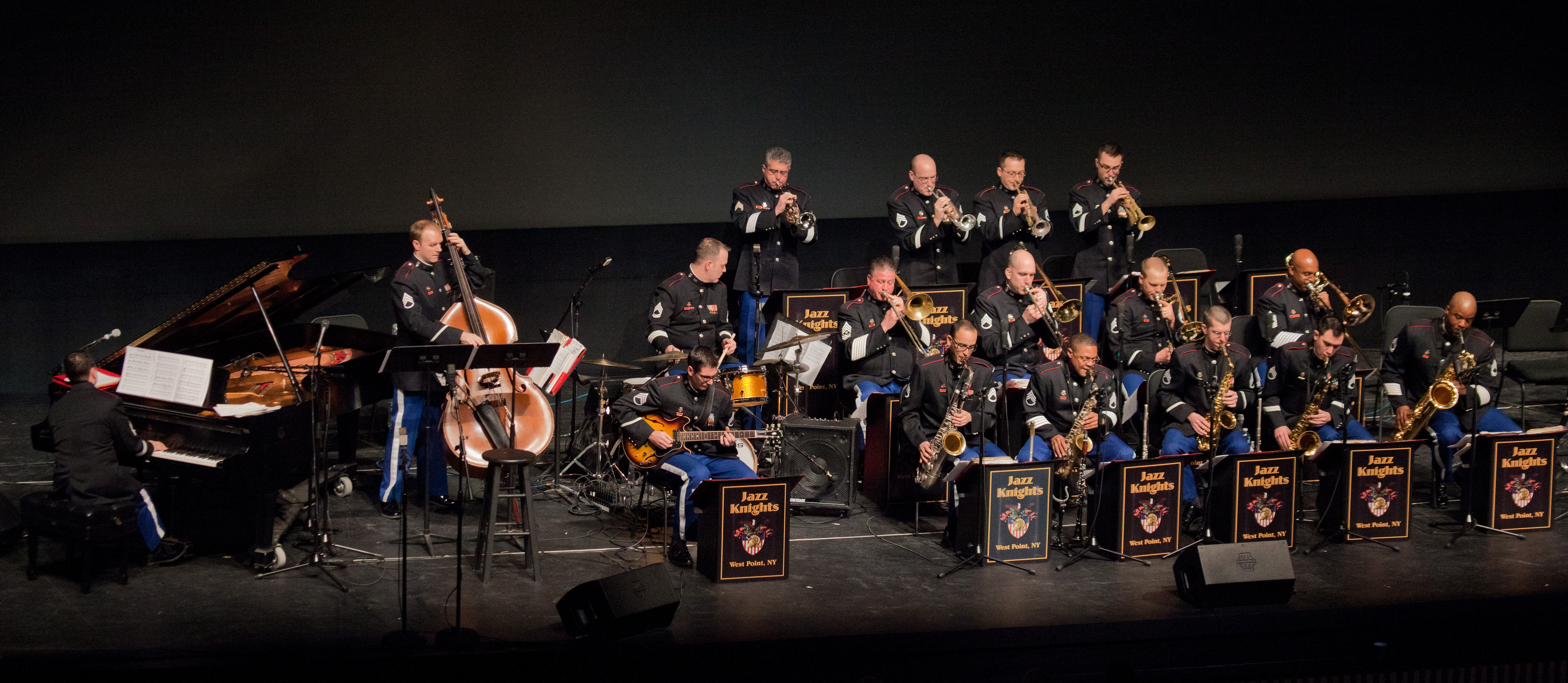
The West Point Band's Jazz Knights perform in West Point's Eisenhower Hall (2011)

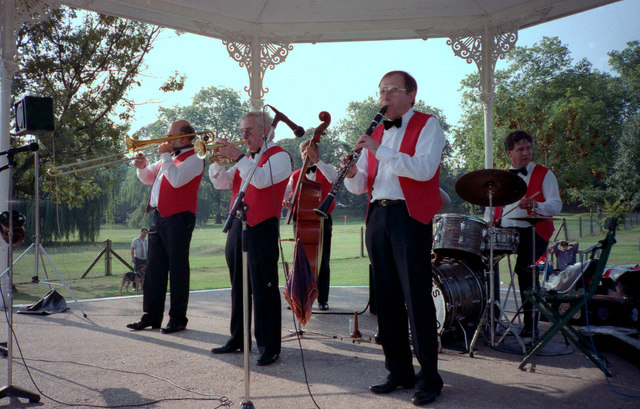
The Magna Jazz Band performs at The Queens Park (1988)

A jazz band (jazz ensemble or jazz combo) is a musical ensemble that plays jazz music. Jazz bands vary in the quantity of its members and the style of jazz that they play but it is common to find a jazz band made up of a rhythm section and a horn section.

The size of a jazz band is closely related to the style of jazz they play as well as the type of venues in which they play. Smaller jazz bands, also known as combos, are common in night clubs and other small venues and will be made up of three to seven musicians; whereas big bands are found in dance halls and other larger venues.

Jazz bands can vary in size from a big band, to a smaller trio or quartet. Some bands use vocalists, while others are purely instrumental groups.

Jazz bands and their composition have changed many times throughout the years, just as the music itself changes with personal interpretation and improvisation of its performers.

== Ensemble types ==
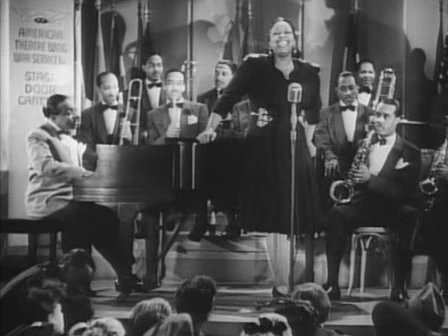
Count Basie and band, with vocalist Ethel Waters, from the film Stage Door Canteen (1943)

=== Combos ===
It is common for musicians in a combo to perform their music from memory. The improvisational nature of these performances make every show unique.

== Instrumentation ==
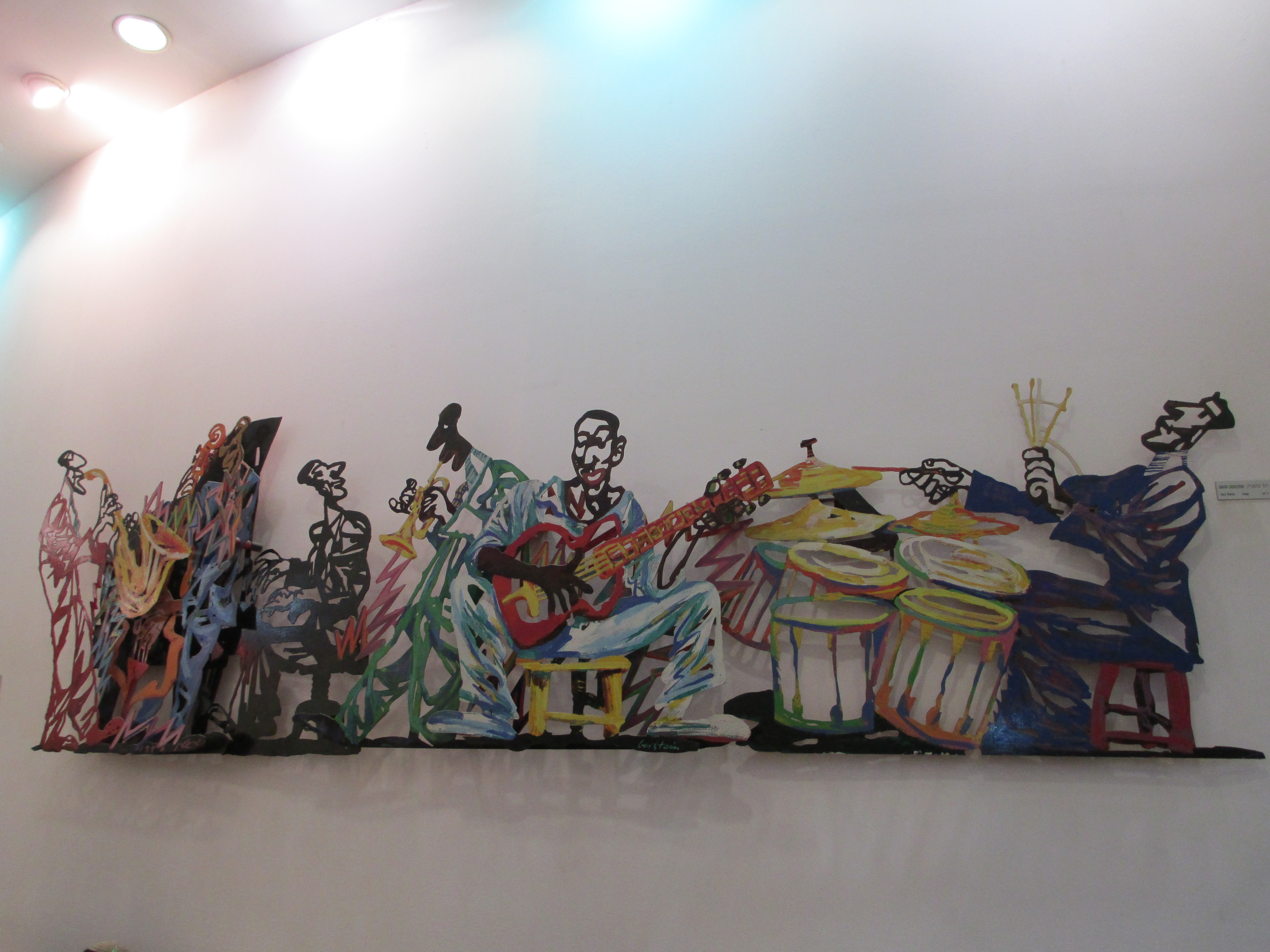
Jazz Band, by Israeli artist David Gerstein

The rhythm section consists of the percussion, double bass or bass guitar, and usually at least one instrument capable of playing chords, such as a piano, guitar, Hammond organ or vibraphone; most will usually have more than one of these. The standard rhythm section is piano, bass, and drums.

The horn section consists of a woodwind section and a brass section, which play the melody.

=== Rhythm section ===
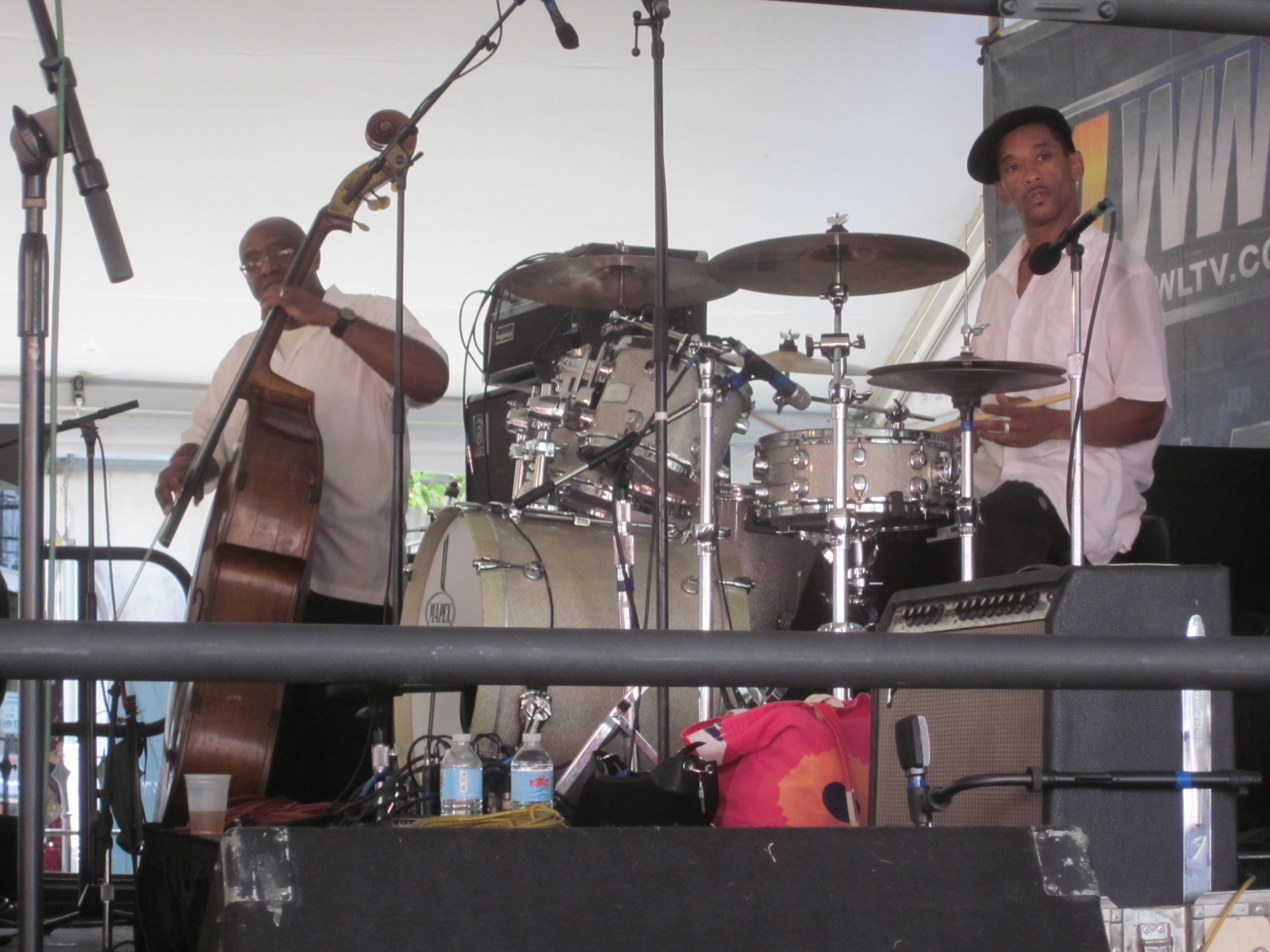
A rhythm section, with bass and drums

==== Banjo ====
The banjo has been used in jazz since the earliest jazz bands. The earliest use of the banjo in a jazz band was by Frank Duson in 1917, however Laurence Marrero claims it became popular in 1915.

There are three common types of banjo, the plectrum banjo, tenor banjo, and cello banjo. Over time, the four-stringed tenor banjo became the most common banjo used in jazz. The drum-like sound box on the banjo made it louder than the acoustic guitars that were common with early jazz bands, and banjos were popular for recording.

==== Bass ====
Jazz Bass

Beginning in the early 1950s, some jazz bass players began to use the electric bass guitar in place of the double bass.

==== Drums ====
Jazz drumming

Jazz drumming is the art of playing percussion, usually the drum set, in jazz styles ranging from 1910s-style Dixieland jazz to 1970s-era jazz-rock fusion and 1980s-era Latin jazz. Stylistically, this aspect of performance was shaped by its starting place, New Orleans, as well as numerous other regions of the world, including other parts of the United States, the Caribbean, and Africa.

Jazz required a method of playing percussion different from traditional European styles, one that was easily adaptable to the different rhythms of the new genre, fostering the creation of jazz drumming's hybrid technique.

=== Woodwind section ===
==== Clarinet ====
Jazz clarinet

The clarinet is a woodwind instrument with a single-reed mouthpiece. A clarinet player is known as a clarinetist. Originally, the clarinet was a central instrument in jazz, beginning with the New Orleans players in the 1910s. It remained a signature instrument of jazz through much of the big band era into the 1940s. Larry Shields was the clarinetist for the Original Dixieland Jazz Band, the first jazz band to record commercially in 1917. The American players Ted Lewis and Jimmie Noone were pioneers of the instrument in jazz bands. The B♭ soprano clarinet was the most common instrument, but a few early jazz musicians such as Alcide Nunez preferred the C soprano clarinet, and many New Orleans jazz brass bands have used an E♭ soprano clarinet. Swing clarinetists such as Benny Goodman, Artie Shaw, and Woody Herman led successful big bands and smaller groups from the 1930s onward.

With the decline of the big bands' popularity in the late 1940s, the clarinet faded from its prominent position in jazz and the saxophone rose in importance in many jazz bands, probably because it uses a less complicated fingering system. But the clarinet did not entirely disappear. In the late 50s, traditional jazz experienced a revival, with the notable example of clarinetist Acker Bilk's Bristol Paramount Jazz Band. Some of the works of Bilk's jazz band reached the pop charts.

==== Saxophone section ====
Jazz saxophone

In the saxophone section, all of the saxophones will play a similar melodic line, but the baritone sax doubles by occasionally joining in with the bass trombone and bass to play the bass line. A big band saxophone section typically consists of two alto saxophones, two tenor saxophones, and one baritone saxophone.

=== String section ===
==== Violin ====
Jazz violin

Jazz violin is the use of the violin or electric violin to improvise solo lines. Although the violin has been used in jazz recordings since the first decades of the 20th century, it is more commonly associated with folk music than jazz. Jazz musician Milt Hinton claimed that the decline in violin players coincided with the introduction of sound movies, as many violin players were used as accompaniment for silent films.

=== Vocalists ===
The definition of a jazz vocalist can be unclear because jazz has shared a great deal with blues and pop music since the 1920s. In their book Essential Jazz, Henry Martin and Keith Waters identify five main characteristics that identify jazz singing, three of which are: "Loose phrasing [...], use of blue notes [...], [and] free melodic embellishment." Often the human voice can act in place of a brass section in playing melodies, both written and improvised.

Scat singing is vocal improvisation with wordless vocables, nonsense syllables or without words at all. Though scat singing is improvised, the melodic lines are often variations on scale and arpeggio fragments, stock patterns and riffs, as is the case with instrumental improvisers. The deliberate choice of scat syllables is also a key element in vocal jazz improvisation. Syllable choice influences the pitch articulation, coloration, and resonance of the performance.

== Repertoire ==
Another important aspect of jazz is improvisation ("jams"). Bands playing in this fashion fall under the category of jam bands. A common way to incorporate improvisation is to feature solo performances from band members made up on the spot, allowing them to showcase their skill.

== Gallery ==
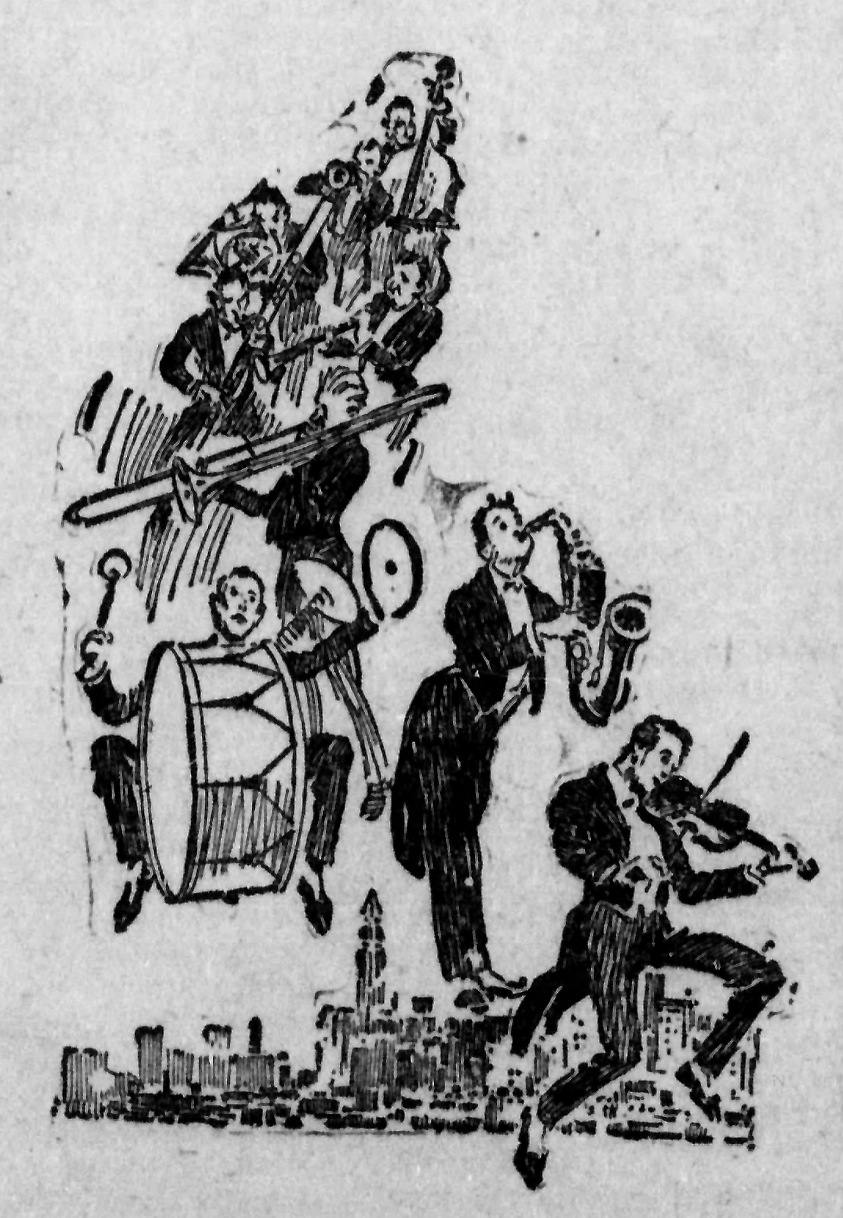
Jazz ensemble in art, 1924

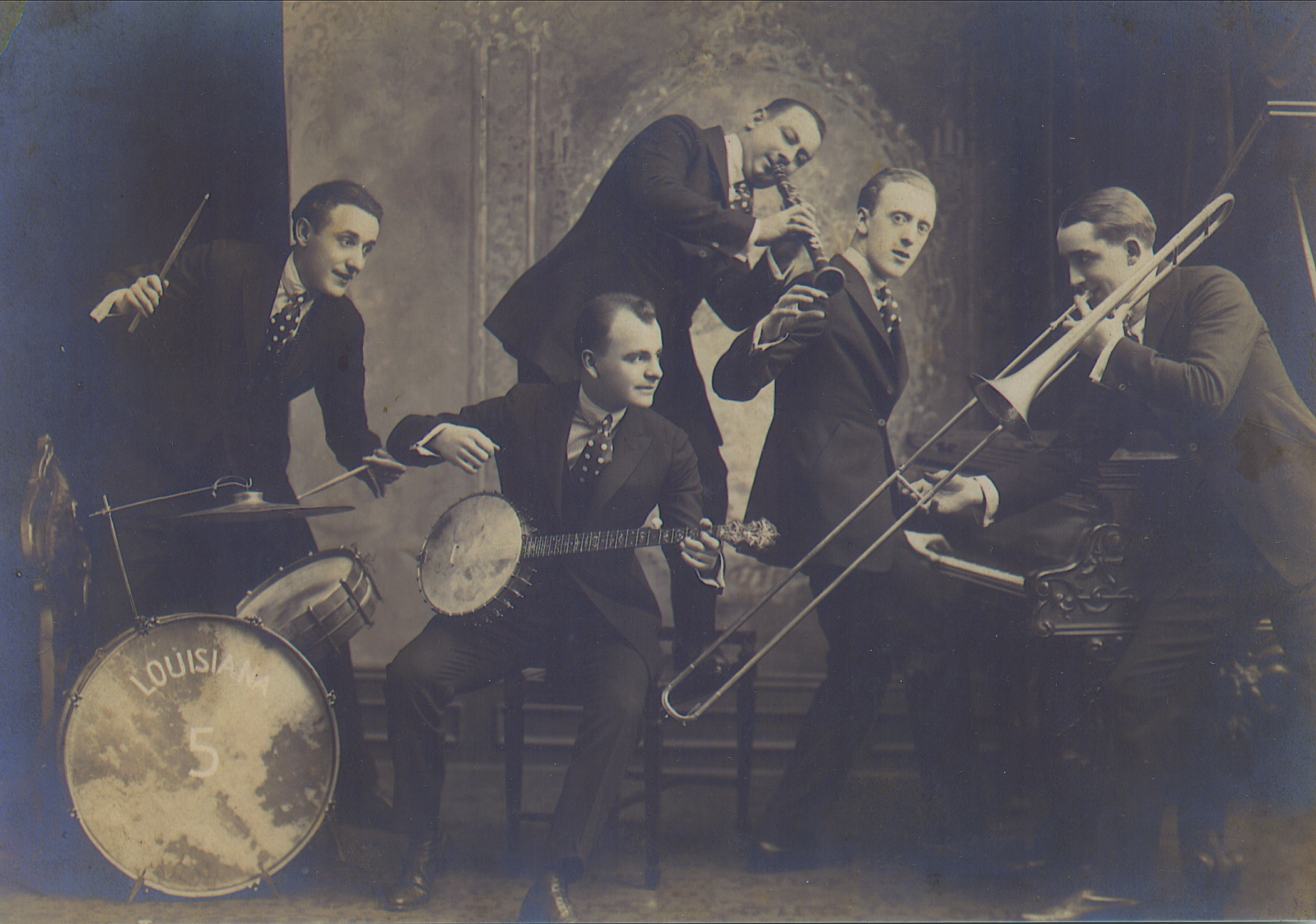
The Louisiana Five Jazz Band in a publicity photo (1919)

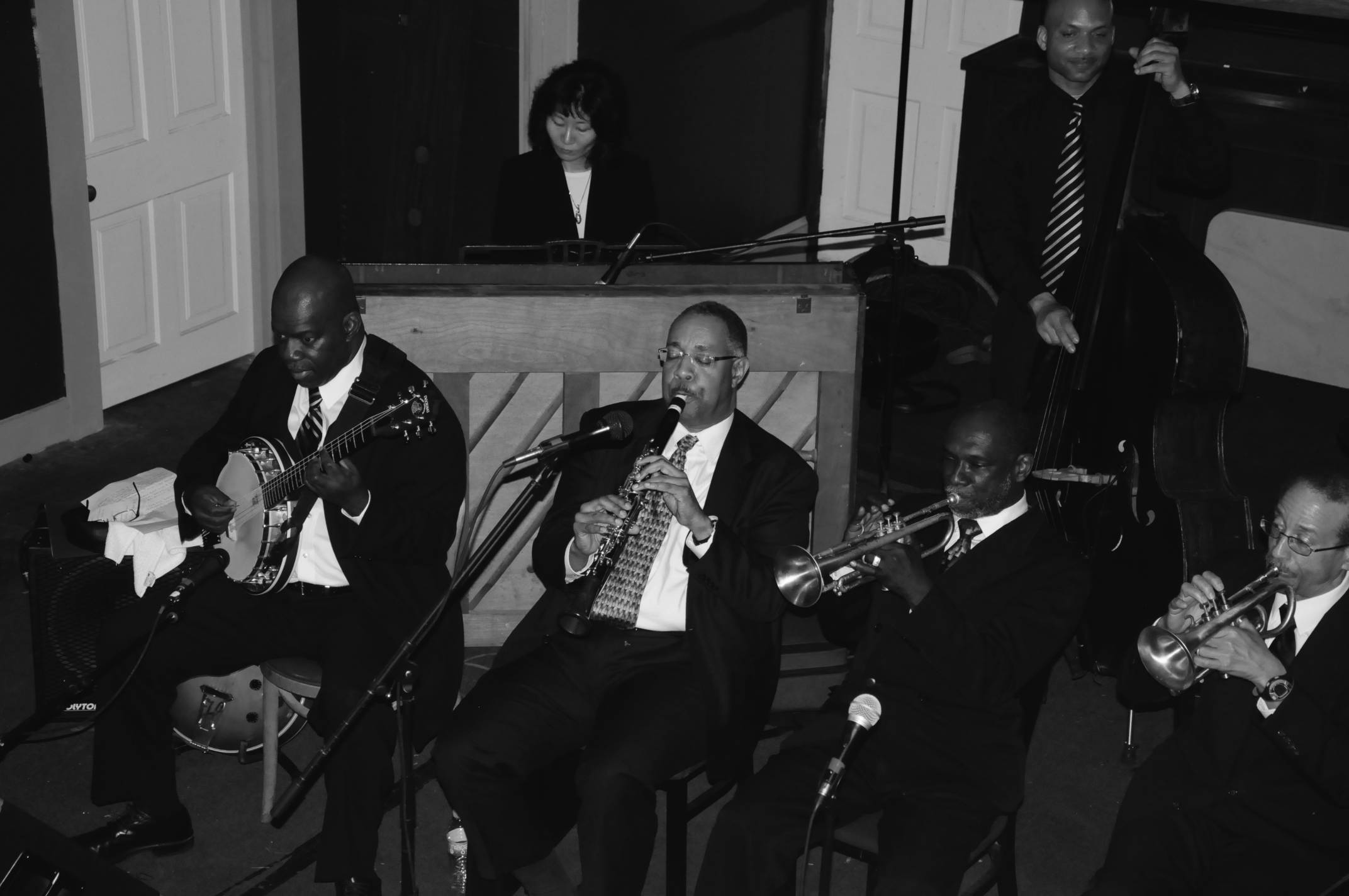
Jazz band performing at Maison, in New Orleans (2010)

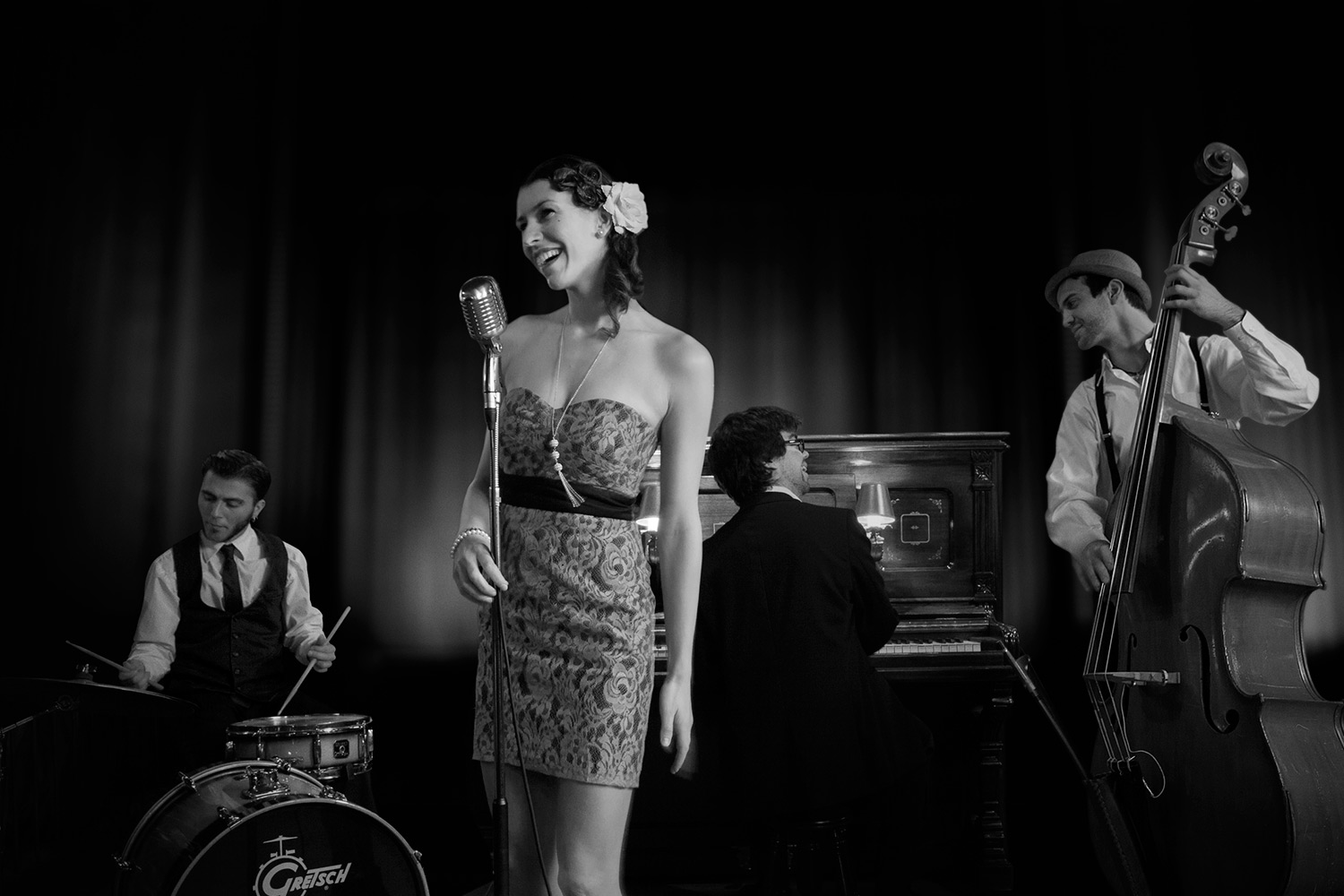
The Montreal Jazz Band (2013)

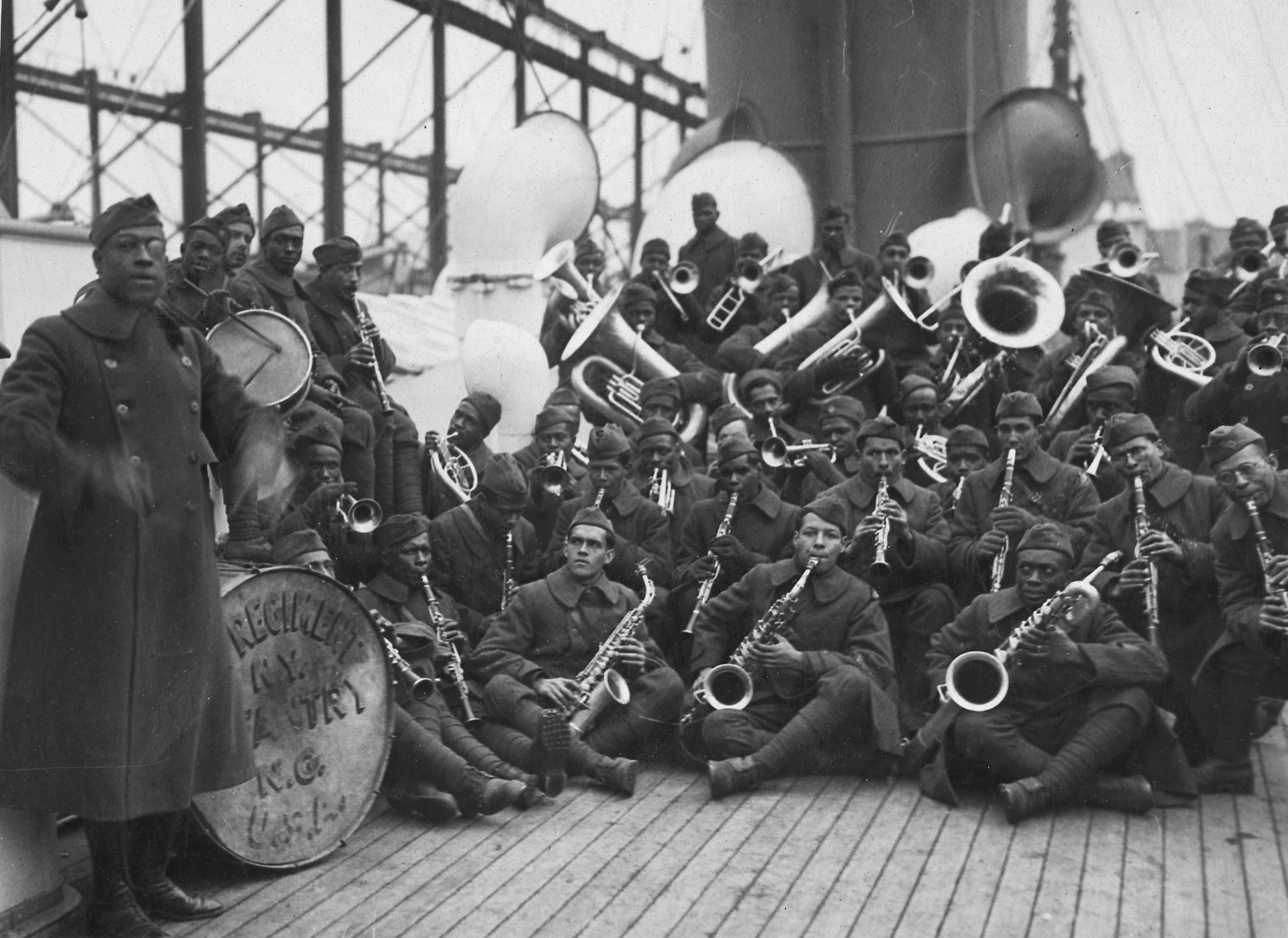
Jazz band leader Lieutenant James Reese with the 369th Infantry (1919)

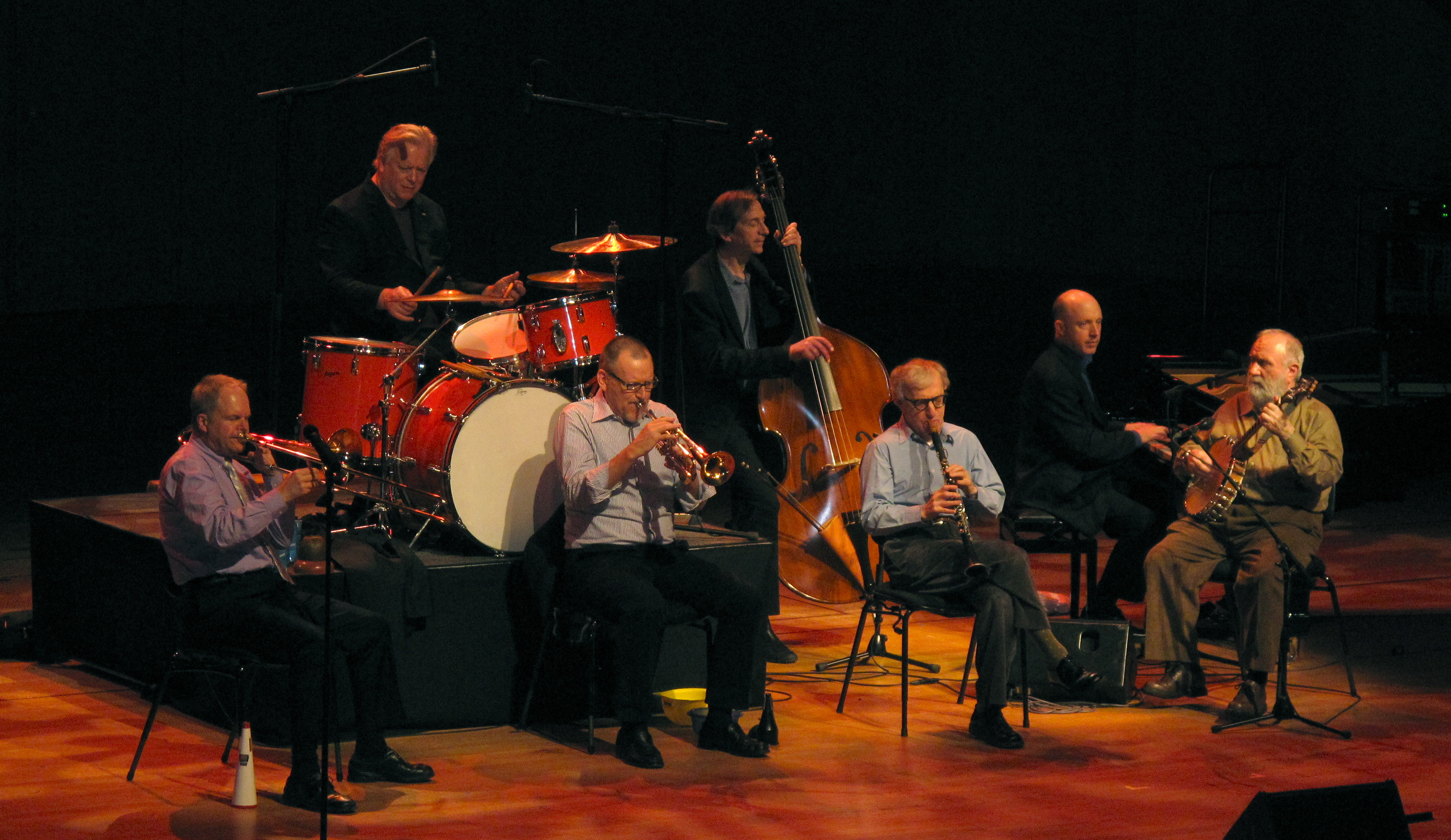
Woody Allen performing with the Eddy Davis New Orleans Jazz Band (2011)

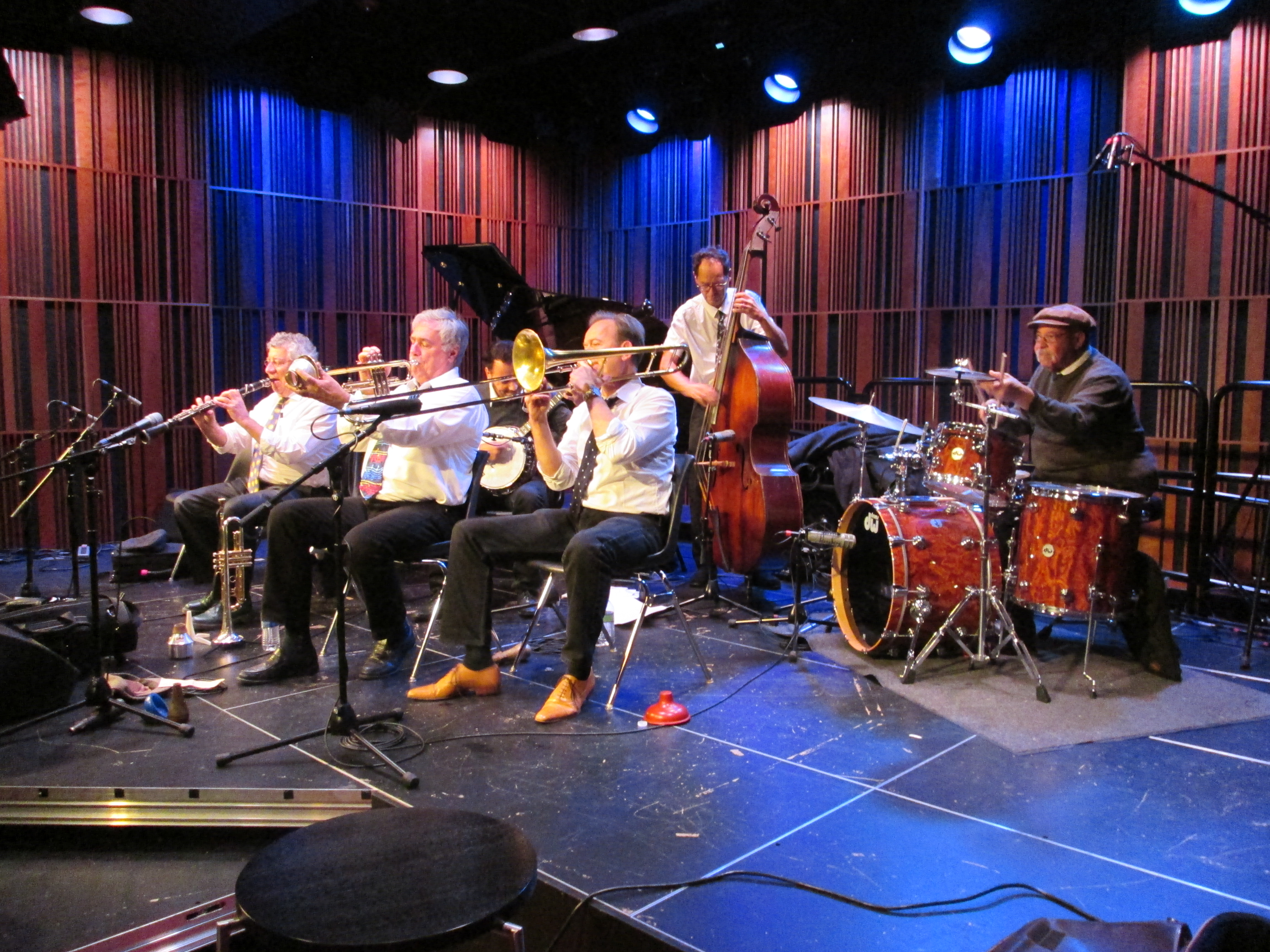
The New Orleans Fiesta Jazz Band, performing at the Old Mint Museum in New Orleans (2013)

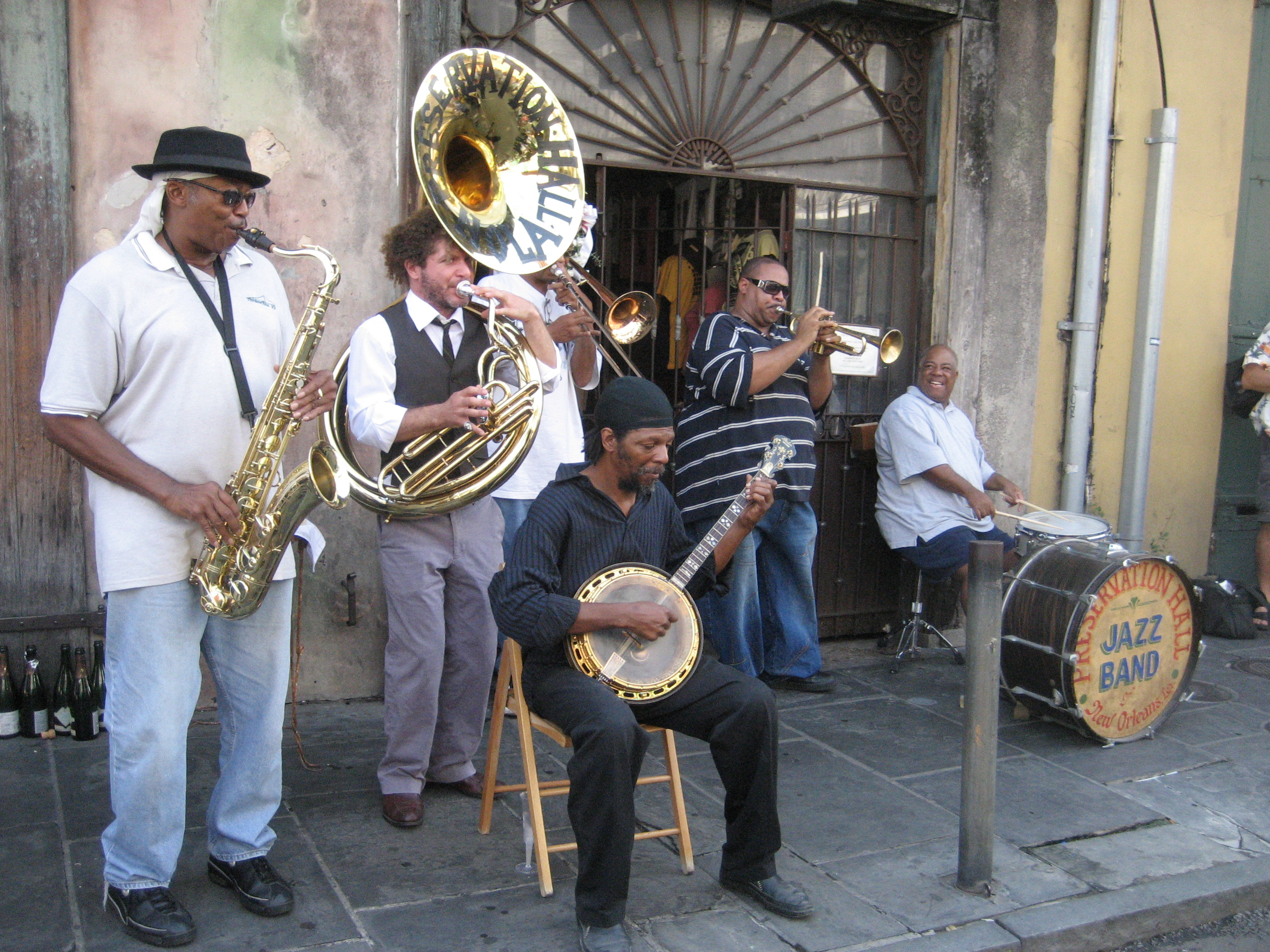
The Preservation Hall Jazz Band performs at the funeral of clarinetist Jacques Gauthé at Preservation Hall (2007)

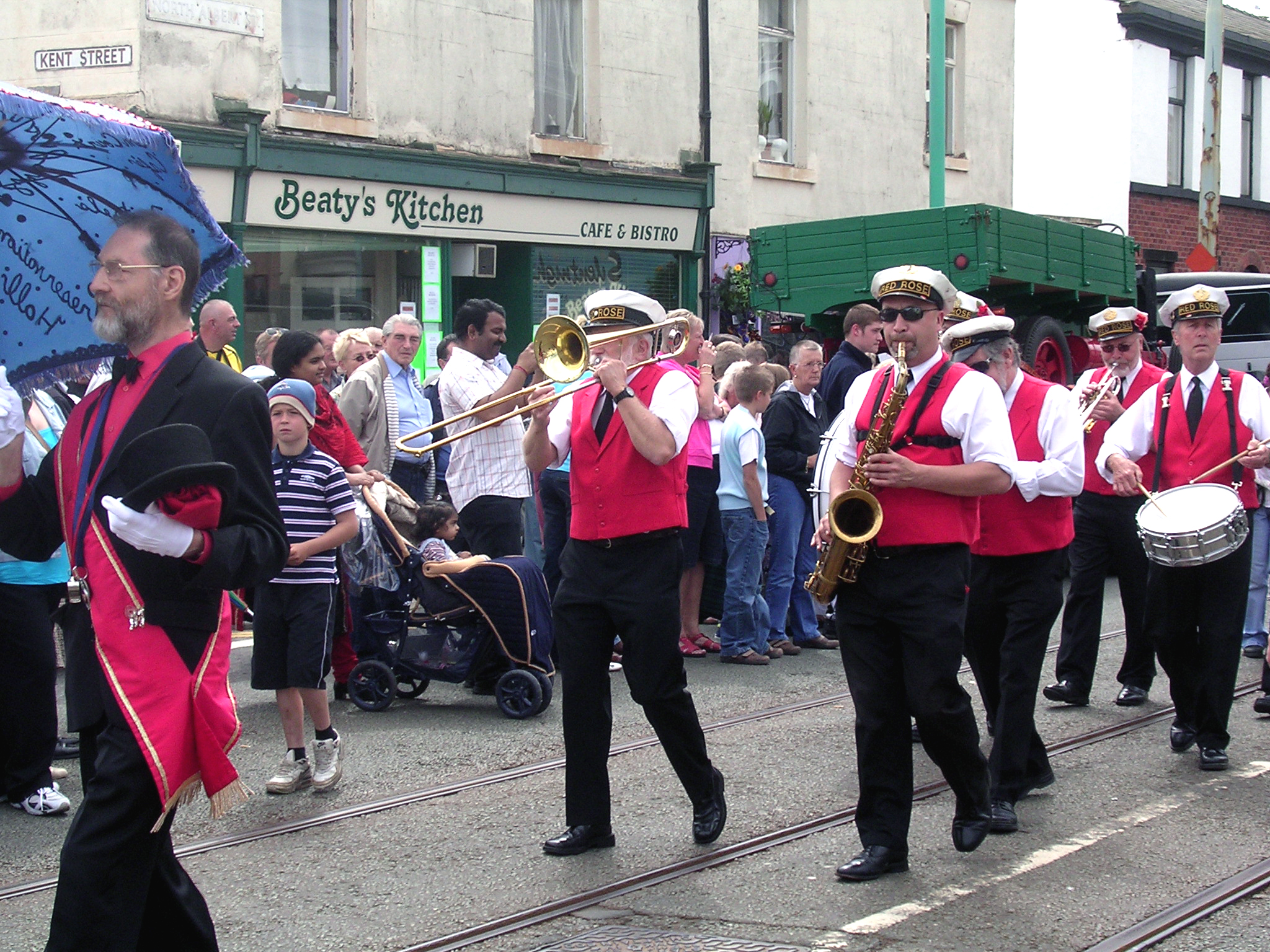
A marching jazz band in Lancashire, UK (2007)

== See also ==
- Juvenile jazz band
- List of big bands
- List of jazz musicians
