= Sonny Igoe =

American jazz drummer (1923–2012)

- Born: Owen Joseph Igoe; 8 October 1923; Jersey City, New Jersey, U.S.
- Died: March 28, 2012 (aged 88) Emerson, New Jersey
- Genres: Jazz, swing, big band
- Occupation: Musician
- Instrument: Drums
- Years active: 1939–2012
- Formerly of: Benny Goodman, Woody Herman

Owen Joseph "Sonny" Igoe (October 8, 1923 – March 28, 2012) was an American jazz drummer and music educator who, toured with the orchestras of Tommy Reed (1913–2012), Les Elgart, Ina Ray Hutton, Benny Goodman, and Woody Herman from the mid-1940s to the mid-1950s.

From the mid-1940s to 1988, he performed on over 79 recordings with bands and artists, including The Buddy Stewart (1922–1950) Quintet, Benny Goodman and His Orchestra, Woody Herman and His Orchestra, Frances Wayne with Neal Hefti and His Orchestra, Rita Moss with the George Williams Orchestra, Charlie Ventura, Tony Bennett, Billy Maxted and His Manhattan Jazz Band, The Chuck Wayne Quintet, The Don Elliott Quintet, Joe Wilder, Phil Napoleon and His Original Memphis Five, Sammy Spear (né Samuel Shapiro; 1909–1975), Pee Wee Erwin, Joe Williams, Marlene Ver Planck (born 1933), Savina (Savina J. Hartwell; 1926–1992), Dick Meldonian (né Richard Anthony Meldonian; born 1930), and Doctor Billy Dodd.

A longtime resident of Emerson, New Jersey, Igoe grew up in Ridgewood and was attending Ridgewood High School when he got his start after winning a Gene Krupa drumming contest.

In the 1960s, Igoe was a member of the NBC Television Orchestra and then the CBS Television Orchestra, where his credits included The Ed Sullivan Show and The Jackie Gleason Show.

Igoe's playing was initially influenced by Krupa, but he soon drew upon elements of Max Roach and others, which eventually developed into an exuberant and individual style.

Jazz drummer, leader of The Birdland Big Band, and music educator Tommy Igoe (Thomas Robert Igoe; born November 18, 1964) is his son.
