= Henry Panion =

American musician and scholar

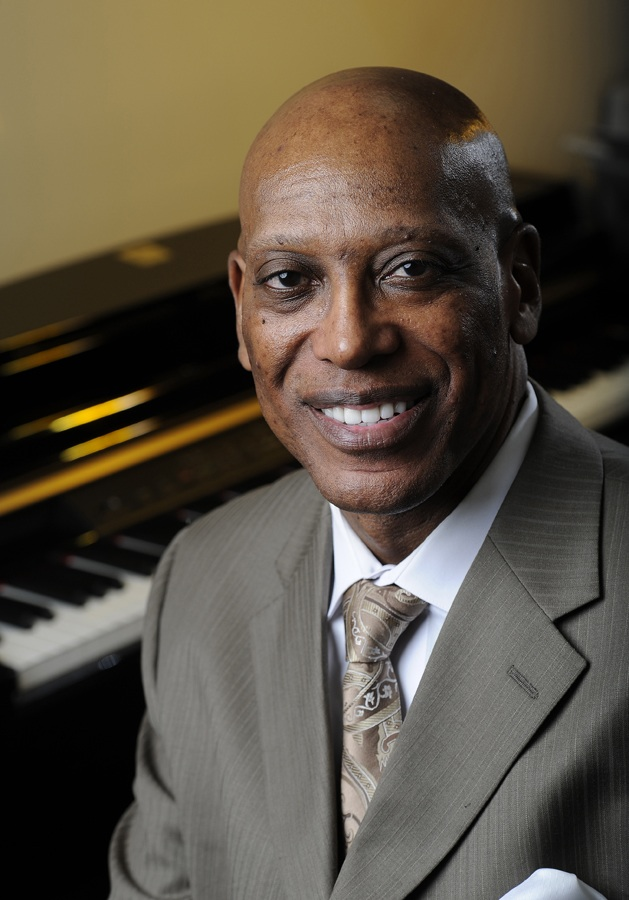
Henry Panion III, PhD

Henry Panion, III is an American composer, arranger, conductor, educator, and Professor in the Department of Music at the University of Alabama at Birmingham.

Panion has produced, arranged and conducted for a number of noted artists, such as Stevie Wonder, The Winans, Chet Atkins, Ellis Marsalis, Jr. with the SuperJazz Big Band, Eugenia Zukerman, Aretha Franklin, The Blind Boys of Alabama, Chaka Khan, the Lionel Hampton Orchestra, and American Idol winners Carrie Underwood and Ruben Studdard.

Panion founded the UAB Recording Studio, where award-winning recordings by such groups as the UAB Gospel Choir and the UAB Jazz Ensemble have been produced.

Panion received the Civic and Cultural Advancement Award from the Congressional Black Caucus Sept. 25, 2009 at the Ronald Reagan Building and International Trade Center in Washington, D.C.source

== Selected discography ==
- Stevie Wonder. "Natural Wonder" (1995) Arranged and conducted by Henry Panion.
- Ellis Marsalis and the SuperJazz Big Band. "UAB SuperJazz, Featuring Ellis Marsalis" (2001) Co-produced by Henry Panion and UAB Jazz Ensemble Director Ray Reach, recorded at the Alys Stephens Center.
- Ruben Studdard. "The Return" (2006) Produced, arranged, orchestrated and conducted by Henry Panion.
- Jonathan Butler and Juanita Bynum with the Gospel Goes Classical Orchestra. "Gospel Goes Classical" (2006). Produced by Henry Panion. Arrangements by Henry Panion, Michael Loveless and Ray Reach. #2 Gospel Album in the US. #3 in the Billboard Classical Crossover category.
- Annetta Nunn (Birmingham Police Chief) "Gospel In Blues" (2007). Produced by Henry Panion. Horn arrangements by Ray Reach.
