= Big Band Jazz de México =

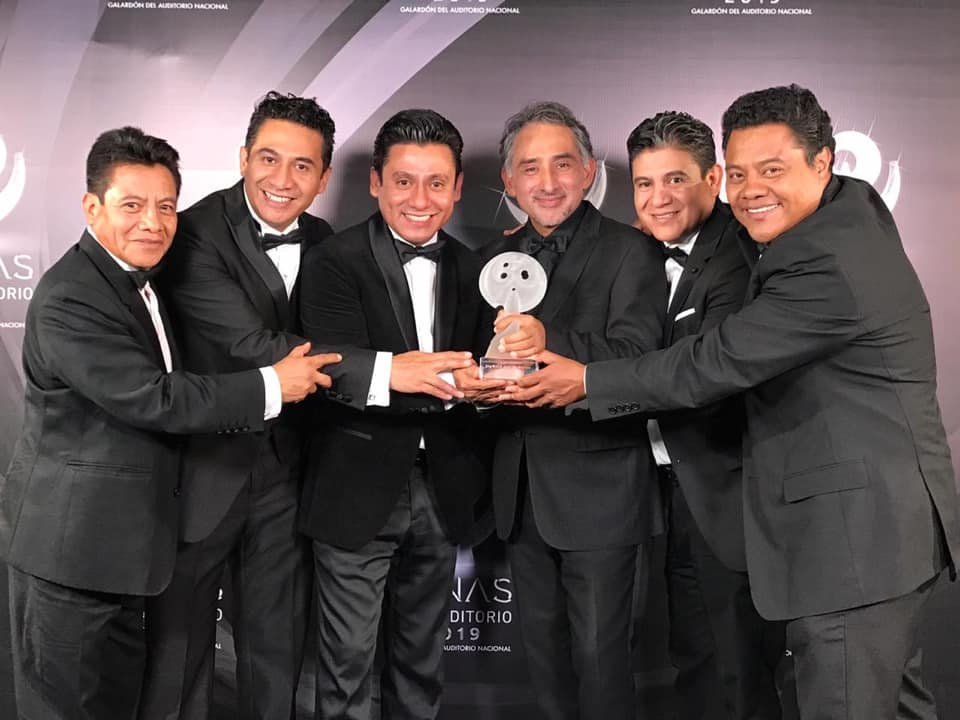
- Big Band Jazz de Mexico winners of Lunas del Auditorio 2019.

Background information
- Origin: Mexico City, Mexico
- Genres: Jazz; big band; blues; soul
- Years active: 1999–present
- Labels: TresCero Entertainment; TresCero Publishing
- Members: Ernesto Ramos; Martin Ramos; Angel Ramos; Gabriel Solares; Citlali Chavez; Mario Garcia Cruz; Juan Pedro Mendoza; Juan Jose Ruvalcaba; Saul Galicia; Oliver Portillo; Karely Esparza; Rodolfo Loeza; Mikey Guzman; Saúl Galicia; Mario Patrón; Juan José Ruvalcaba
- Website: www.bigbandjazzdemexico.com

Big Band Jazz de México is a big band orchestra founded in 1999 by musicians from Mexico City.

== History ==
Big Band Jazz de México was founded in 1999 by musicians from Mexico City to promote jazz in Mexico. Most of the members are from Xochimilco borough of the city and began theirmusical studies in the children's and youth bands here. Many of these members also have studied professionally at schools such as Escuela Nacional de Música, National Conservatory of Music of Mexico, Escuela Superior de Música, la Escuela Libre de Música and the Escuela de Música del Sindicato Único de Trabajadores de la Música. The band is conducted by Ernesto Ramos with general coordination by Martín Ramos.

== Genre ==
While mostly dedicated to jazz, it also plays other types of selections from tango, various Latin styles and even popular music. Mexican composers that it favors include Agustín Lara, Eugenio Toussaint, and especially Armando Manzanero, with such songs as Cuando estoy contigo, Voy apagar la luz, Somos Novios and Como yo te amé. Other notable songs played by the band include Mucho corazón by Emma Elena Valdelamar and Se te olvida by Oaxacan composer Álvaro Carrillo.

== Trajectory ==
The band has participated in various jazz festival and has headlined its own events. It has appeared at the Auditorio Nacional at the annual Las lunas del Auditorio event, which has resulted in their music appearing on two live albums. It has played at the Auditorio Nacional for eight seasons with a series of shows it has headlined. It has appeared on the television program Acústico on Mexico's Canal 22 as well as other programs on Canal 11 and Canal 13. One of its most recent performances includes a joint appearance with Armando Manzanero at the Festival Internacional Cervantino. Other artists with whom the band has collaborated include Gualberto Castro, Ana Cirré, Aida and Carlos Cuevas, Miguel Ríos and the Chico O'Farrill Big Band.

== Documentary ==
The band's history was made into a documentary called Resiliencia por una nota, directed by Luis Felipe Ferra.

== Awards ==
In 2018, the actresses Silvia Pinal y Amparo Garrido Arozamena, awarded Big Band Jazz de México in the ceremony of Premios Bravo, in honor of their artistic trajectory and 20 years active.

In October 2019, Big Band Jazz de México was awarded in Lunas del Auditorio, like best show in the year, in the Jazz and Blues category, been nominated with: Daniel Boaventura, Festival Internacional de Jazz de Polanco, Juan García Esquivel and Paté de Fuá.
