= Mark Hilburn =

American jazz musician

- Born: March 1913
- Died: October 15, 1975 (aged 62) Los Angeles, California
- Genre: Jazz
- Occupations: Musician; photographer
- Instruments: Saxophone; clarinet
- Formerly of: Mark Hilburn and His Orchestra
- Spouse: Millicent Gold (m. 1920)

Mark Hilburn (March 1913 – October 15, 1975) was a saxophone and clarinet player. He played with an orchestra that later came to be known as Mark Hilburn and His Orchestra.

== Mark Hilburn and His Orchestra ==
Mark Hilburn's group went by a variety of different names. Hilburn joined in the early 1930s, when the society orchestra was called The Nomads. In the mid-40s, the orchestra was simply known as Mark Hilburn's Orchestra featuring Millicent Gold, vocalist. In the 1950s, it was Mark Hilburn and his Orchestra, New Sounds for Dancing, featuring Millicent Gold, vocalist.

The Hilburn Orchestra played in the big band styles of Glenn Miller, Guy Lombardo, Freddy Martin, and Russ Morgan. The orchestra was featured at East Coast ballrooms such as Donohue's, the Asbury Park Casino, Frank Dailey's Ivanhoe, and the Nottingham Ballroom. The orchestra was also in demand at colleges and universities for balls and inter-fraternity events. They were featured at New York City's Waldorf-Astoria hotel, as well as the Hotel Pierre. Pocono mountain resorts were the orchestra's summer engagements. The orchestra played on French line cruises to Bermuda and France.

=== Notable songs ===
One of the orchestra's better-known songs was "You, Too, Can Be a Dreamer", later recorded by Patti Page.

== Personal life ==
Hilburn married Millicent Gold (1920–2006). They had one daughter, Gwenn Steins.

=== Photography ===
Hillburn was a noted professional photographer who introduced the Hilburn Development System for developing black and white photographs.

== Death ==
Hilburn died in 1975 at the age of 62 in Los Angeles, California.
