= The Birdland Big Band =

Jazz orchestra at Birdland in New York City

The Birdland Big Band is a 16-piece jazz orchestra that performs at the Birdland Jazz Club in New York City. The band is led by saxophonist David DeJesus.

DeJesus joined as saxophonist and leader in October 2017 and brought with him an emphasis on traditional swing and the blues. He hired drummer Chris Smith, bassist Doug Weiss, trumpeter Brandon Lee, and added a fourth trombonist in Ron Wilkins. These musicians joined Glenn Drewes, Tony Lustig, John Walsh, Mark Miller, Kenny Ascher, and Nathan Childers. In 2017 vocalist Veronica Swift was added.

== History ==
The band was created in 2006 by drummer Tommy Igoe, son of jazz drummer Sonny Igoe. Tommy Igoe founded The Friday Night Big Band with musicians from a big band that was in residence at Birdland. That band was founded and directed by Lew Anderson, who died in 2006. After Igoe took over, he changed the name to Birdland Big Band and built a repertoire of contemporary compositions, original arrangements, and select historical works, some forgotten or rare. Guest musicians included Will Lee, James Genus, Conrad Korsch, and Broadway pit musicians who use the early evening sessions as a warm-up for their performances later that night. After Igoe left the band, it was directed for several years by Rob Middleton and Glenn Drewes.

== Members ==
- David DeJesus – leader/tenor saxophone
- Nathan Childers – alto saxophone
- Alejandro Aviles – alto saxophone
- Mike Migliori – tenor saxophone
- Tony Lustig – baritone saxophone
- Glenn Drewes – trumpet
- John Walsh – trumpet
- Raul Agraz – trumpet
- Brandon Lee – trumpet
- Mark Miller – trombone
- Sara Jacovino – trombone
- Ron Wilkins – trombone
- James Borowski – bass trombone
- Chris Smith – drums
- Kenny Ascher – piano
- Doug Weiss – bass

== Discography ==
- The Lew Anderson Tribute Concert (2007)
- Eleven (2012)
