= Alys Robinson Stephens Performing Arts Center =

Performing arts facility in Birmingham, Alabama, United States

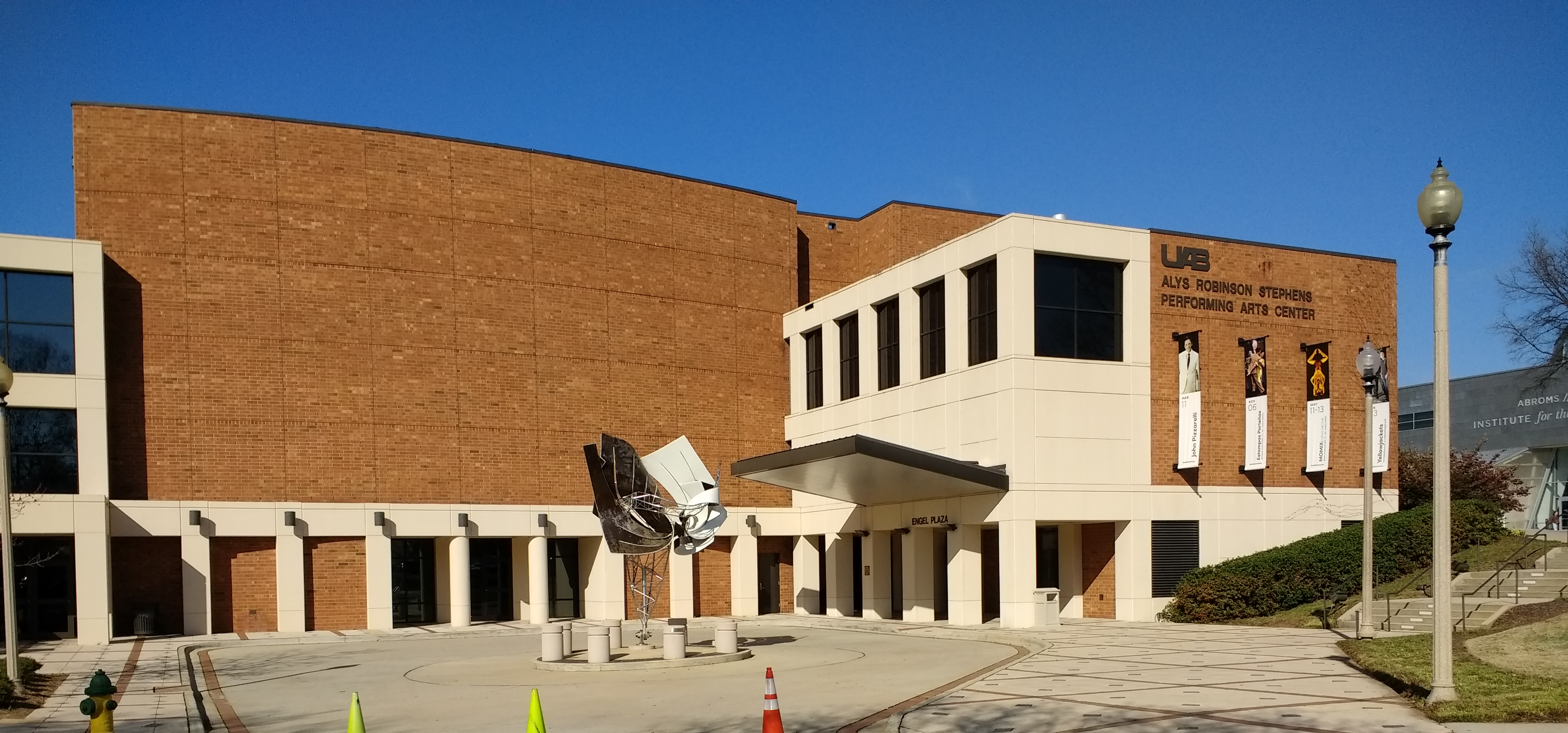
- Interactive map of Alys Robinson Stephens Performing Arts Center
- Address: 1200 10th Ave South
- Location: Birmingham, Alabama
- Coordinates: 33°29′50″N 86°48′28″W
- Owner: University of Alabama at Birmingham
- Operator: University of Alabama at Birmingham
- Capacity: Jemison Concert Hall: 1,330; Sirote Theatre: 350; Reynolds-Kirschbaum Recital Hall: 170; Odess Theatre: 150
- Type: Performing arts center

Construction
- Opened: 1996

Tenants
- Alabama Symphony Orchestra; UAB Department of Music; UAB Department of Theatre

Website
- www.alysstephens.org

The Alys Robinson Stephens Performing Arts Center (ASC) is a performing arts facility located on the campus of the University of Alabama at Birmingham (UAB). It hosts over 250,000 people for more than 300 diverse events annually. The ASC is the center for entertainment and arts education in Birmingham and Central Alabama. The facility houses four performance venues, including the 1,330-seat Jemison Concert Hall, the 350-seat Sirote Theatre, the intimate 170-seat Reynolds-Kirschbaum Recital Hall, and the black-box Odess Theatre.

The ASC hosts a wide variety of events each year, in every field of artistic endeavor, from classical music, to jazz, to theatre and visual arts. Jazz programming offered by the ASC has included Diane Schuur, Branford Marsalis, the Count Basie Orchestra, and the UAB SuperJazz Big Band. Classical concerts have included Itzhak Perlman and major European orchestras. The ASC is the official home of the Alabama Symphony Orchestra. The ASC often collaborates with other local arts organizations, such as the Birmingham Music Club and the Alabama Jazz Hall of Fame to present concerts and educational programs, such as the Fun With Jazz Educational Program.

The Alys Stephens Center is also a venue for live recordings, including "Gospel Goes Classical," produced by UAB music professor Henry Panion, and "UAB SuperJazz, Featuring Ellis Marsalis," co-produced by Henry Panion and former UAB Director of Jazz Ensembles, Ray Reach.

== See also ==
- List of concert halls
- Alys Beach, Florida
