= Dallas Jazz Orchestra =

American jazz big band, founded 1973

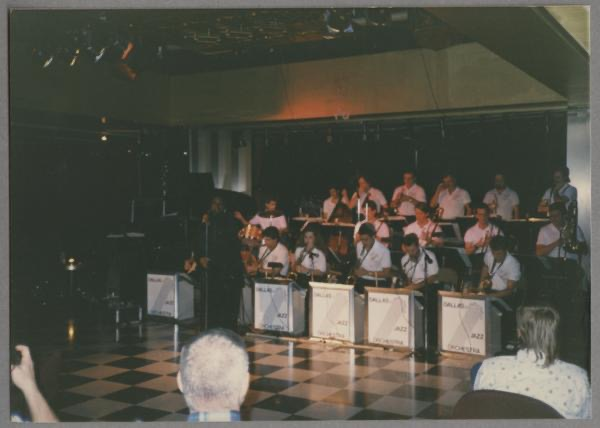
Dallas Jazz Orchestra on the SS Norway jazz cruise (October 1989)

The Dallas Jazz Orchestra (DJO) is an American jazz big band based in Dallas, Texas. Founded by Galen Jeter and Thom Mason in 1973, the DJO was once called "the only community-supported jazz orchestra in the world" by radio show host Dr. Cone Johnson. The DJO performed internationally, twice at the Montreux Jazz Festival, at the Seville Expo '92 in Spain, and on SS Norway Caribbean jazz cruises. The twenty-piece jazz orchestra also played for two United States presidents, including an impromptu performance of "Georgia on my Mind" for President Jimmy Carter, and a performance on the campaign trail for then-Vice President George H. W. Bush. The original band recorded eleven albums, and released Scrapbook: The Best of the First 25 Years, a retrospective, in 1998.

In the early 2000s, Jeter left the DJO to form the Dallas' Original Jazz Orchestra (DOJO), taking nearly the entire band with him. In 2004, Galen Jeter and Dallas' Original Jazz Orchestra recorded "The Big 3-0", commemorating their 30th anniversary.

== Origins ==
Co-founder Galen Jeter played trumpet in the University of North Texas One O'Clock Lab Band and in the Woody Herman Orchestra. In the late 1960s, Jeter moved to Dallas and worked as a high school biology teacher in Garland, Texas. In 1973, Jeter and Thom Mason, then a professor at Southern Methodist University, decided to look for local musicians to jam with and "help keep the big-band spirit alive". Forming the Dallas Jazz Orchestra, they held rehearsals at the SMU band hall, which they quickly outgrew, and performed live for the first time the following year.

Co-founder and saxophonist Thom Mason was musical director through 1977. As the band gained momentum, many accomplished musicians joined DJO, including instrumentalists who had performed with jazz greats such as Duke Ellington, Stan Kenton, Woody Herman, Maynard Ferguson, and Stan Getz. Leon Breeden, Director of Jazz Studies at the University of North Texas College of Music, who had taught Jeter as a student, served on the governing board of DJO. He helped the jazz orchestra find musicians, and was a guest clarinetist. Wayne Morgan, a long-time proprietor of several Dallas nightclubs, became chairman of the board. Over three decades, Galen Jeter also encouraged hundreds of talented young musicians from UNT and other schools to join the DJO or play alongside them.

== Performances and recordings ==
Dallas Jazz Orchestra held its first concert at Joe Miller's club in 1974. Later that year, the DJO started playing at jazz singer Maxine Kent's Club on Lemmon Avenue in Dallas once a month and attracted standing-room-only crowds. They eventually moved to performing there twice a month, with rehearsals during alternating weeks, for a period of four years.

The DJO recorded its first album, Hey Man!, live at Maxine Kent's in Dallas on February 9, 1975. Its second album, Tuesday the 15th, was also recorded at Maxine Kent's in 1976. In a review published in D Magazine, David Ritz characterized the band as "first-rate Dallas musicians who play together, not for profit, but sheer pleasure. The results are uneven, loose, spontaneous and whimsical."

From 1978 through most of the 1980s, the Dallas Jazz Orchestra played every Sunday night at Popsicle Toes, a club owned by Wayne Morgan, who became more involved with the group and served as chairman. In 1982, Popsicle Toes's listing in the Texas Monthly said that the DJO "rallies the fans of Kenton, Herman, and Ferguson, many of whose alumni staff the band."

The Dallas Jazz Orchestra was invited to perform at the Montreux Jazz Festival in Switzerland in 1985 and 1989. By January 1989, the DJO had moved to Poor David's Pub, before becoming regulars at the Village Country Club for many years.

In October 1989, the Dallas Jazz Orchestra was featured on the SS Norway jazz cruise, described by Norwegian Cruise Line as its "seventh annual floating jazz festival". In 1992, the DJO was invited to perform at the World's Fair in Seville, Spain. On tour and at jazz festivals, the Dallas Jazz Orchestra accompanied a long list of celebrity artists, including Diahann Carroll, Billy Eckstine, Doc Severinsen, Bob Hope, Steve Allen, Mel Tormé, Joe Williams and the Four Freshmen.

In 1998, the Dallas Jazz Orchestra released its twelfth album, Scrapbook: The First 25 Years. Its 1990 album, Thank You, Leon, was a tribute to Leon Breeden, with a title track commissioned by Abilene, Texas, radio personality Cone Johnson, also known as "Dr. Jazz", a major supporter of the DJO who attended nearly all of their performances.

== Organization ==
As a nonprofit organization, the band struggled at times to stay afloat. Band members would typically take home $10 each after a weekly performance, and then put any remainder of earnings from the $5-per-person door charge toward a travel fund. Otherwise, the DJO relied on donor contributions and sales of CDs and t-shirts. To finance the group's trip to Switzerland in 1989, Galen Jeter took out a loan for $23,000; for the trip to Spain, he helped to raise $50,000.

In the early 2000s, Galen Jeter left the DJO to form the Dallas' Original Jazz Orchestra, taking most band members with him. The Dallas Jazz Orchestra continues to perform concerts as a separate entity.

== Discography ==
Dallas Jazz Orchestra:

- Hey Man! (1975)
- Tuesday the 15th (1976)
- North Garland Jazz Live (1980)
- Super Chicken (1980)
- Morning Glory (1982)
- Fat Mamma's Revenge (1984)
- Live at Montreaux (1985)
- Romeo and Juliet (1988)
- Thank You, Leon (1990)
- Turning Twenty (1992)
- Dallas Jazz Orchestra Plays Dee Barton (1994), featuring Don Menza (Note: Although it is often stated that the Dallas Jazz Orchestra Plays Dee Barton was "Grammy-nominated", there is no record of such a nomination on the Grammy Awards web site.)
- Scrapbook (1996)

Galen Jeter and Dallas' Original Jazz Orchestra:

- The Big 3-0 (2004)
- Messin' with Texas (2006)
- Where There's Smoke (2009), featuring Drenda Barnett

Dallas Jazz Orchestra directed by Curtis Bradshaw:

- The Dallas Jazz Orchestra Presents Victor Cager (2006)
