= Magic City Jazz Orchestra =

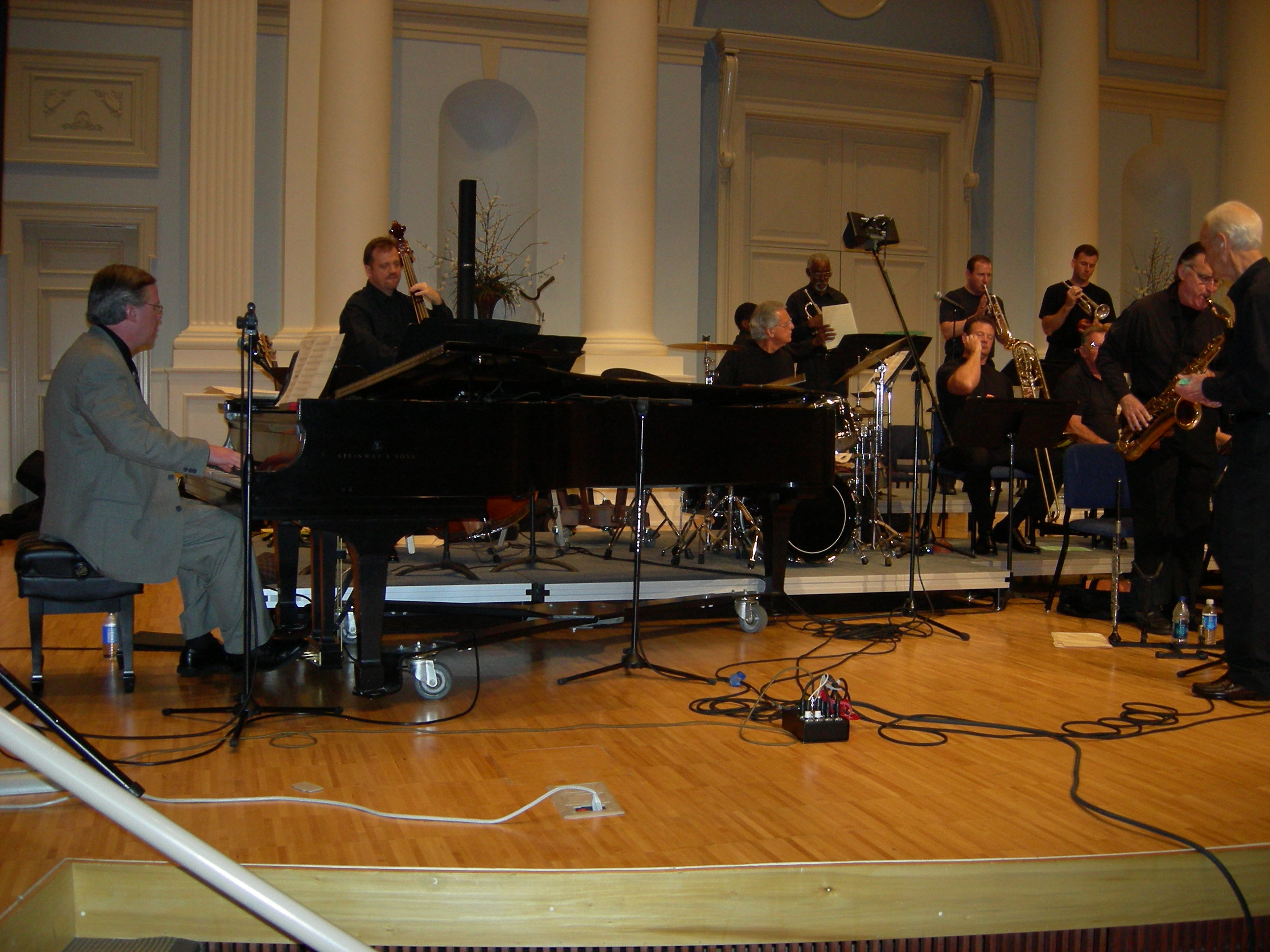
Magic City Jazz Orchestra Founding Director Ray Reach (at the piano), performing at Samford University with the SuperJazz Big Band, 2007.

The Magic City Jazz Orchestra (MCJO) is an American jazz ensemble which was founded in 1999 as a spin-off of the SuperJazz Big Band (formerly UAB SuperJazz) by Birmingham, Alabama jazz pianist and vocalist Ray Reach. The mission of the group is to "...perform and record big band jazz music written by well known but under-recorded jazz artists." (From the Mission Statement of the MCJO bylaws.)

== History ==
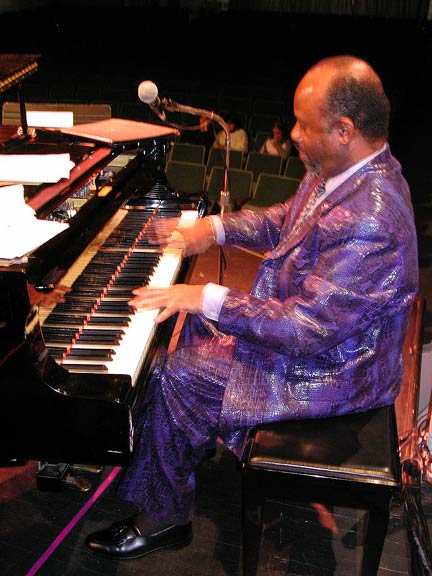
Pianist Johnny O'Neal performing in concert with SuperJazz. Photo by Ray Reach.

The SuperJazz Big Band (formerly UAB SuperJazz) was founded in the 1970s by several Birmingham, Alabama musicians who were interested in big band jazz, including Charles Ard, Mallory Pierce, Sonny Harris, Bernie Bell, and Dr. Everett Lawler. Initially, the band met and rehearsed at Boutwell Recording Studio in Birmingham. Later, the founding members of SuperJazz decided to affiliate with the newly formed Music Department at the University of Alabama at Birmingham (UAB), and subsequently became the first performing musical ensemble connected with UAB. After a 20-plus year association with the UAB Music Department, ties were severed and the band adopted John Carroll Catholic High School as its rehearsal and concert home for several years. As of September 2007, the group now presents concerts four times a year at the new Brock Recital Hall at Samford University in Birmingham, Alabama. SuperJazz has remained a very popular jazz orchestra in the Birmingham metro area for more than 30 years.

SuperJazz has performed and/or recorded with many notable jazz artists, including Ernie Watts, Lou Marini, Lew Soloff, Chuck Redd, Andy Martin. Johnny O'Neal and Ellis Marsalis. In 2001, a recording titled "UAB SuperJazz, Featuring Ellis Marsalis" was released by UAB Entertainment Records. The CD, produced by UAB Music Department faculty members Ray Reach and Henry Panion and recorded at UAB's Alys Stephens Center for the Performing Arts, features arrangements by Founding Director Everett Lawler, trombonist Charlie Ard, saxophonist Neil McLean, arranger Steve Sample Sr and pianist Ray Reach. SuperJazz has spawned a number of spin-off groups, such as the Night Flight Big Band and the Magic City Jazz Orchestra.

In 1998, Ray Reach, then director of the UAB Jazz Ensemble and founding director of the Magic City Jazz Orchestra, contacted New York saxophonist Lou Marini in order to hire him to be guest artist and clinician for the annual Weekend of Jazz festival at the University of Alabama at Birmingham (UAB). Mr. Marini subsequently came to Birmingham, where he conducted jazz workshops and appeared in concert with the SuperJazz Big Band.

Mr. Reach suggested to Marini that a recording of his numerous big band compositions and arrangements was long overdue. Further, Reach suggested, Marini could make an exceptionally high quality recording using the musicians from SuperJazz and the recording facilities available in the Birmingham area. Mr. Marini agreed to do just that. This recording was, in fact, Marini's debut as a leader.

So, in 1999, Marini and Reach began work on co-producing a recording titled "Lou's Blues" at Bates Brothers Recording in Hueytown, a suburb of Birmingham. Both Marini and Reach agreed that for this new recording they would assemble a new band composed of some of the regular members of SuperJazz, supplemented by other players from the area. This new band needed a new name, Thus, the Magic City Jazz Orchestra was born.

Following the successful recording of "Lou's Blues," Reach decided to make the MCJO an ongoing official organization, dedicated to the continuance of the great tradition of the American jazz orchestra. He planned a series of jazz orchestra recordings, featuring well-known but under-recorded artists, such as Lou Marini, Lew Soloff, Tom Malone and others.

== Recordings ==
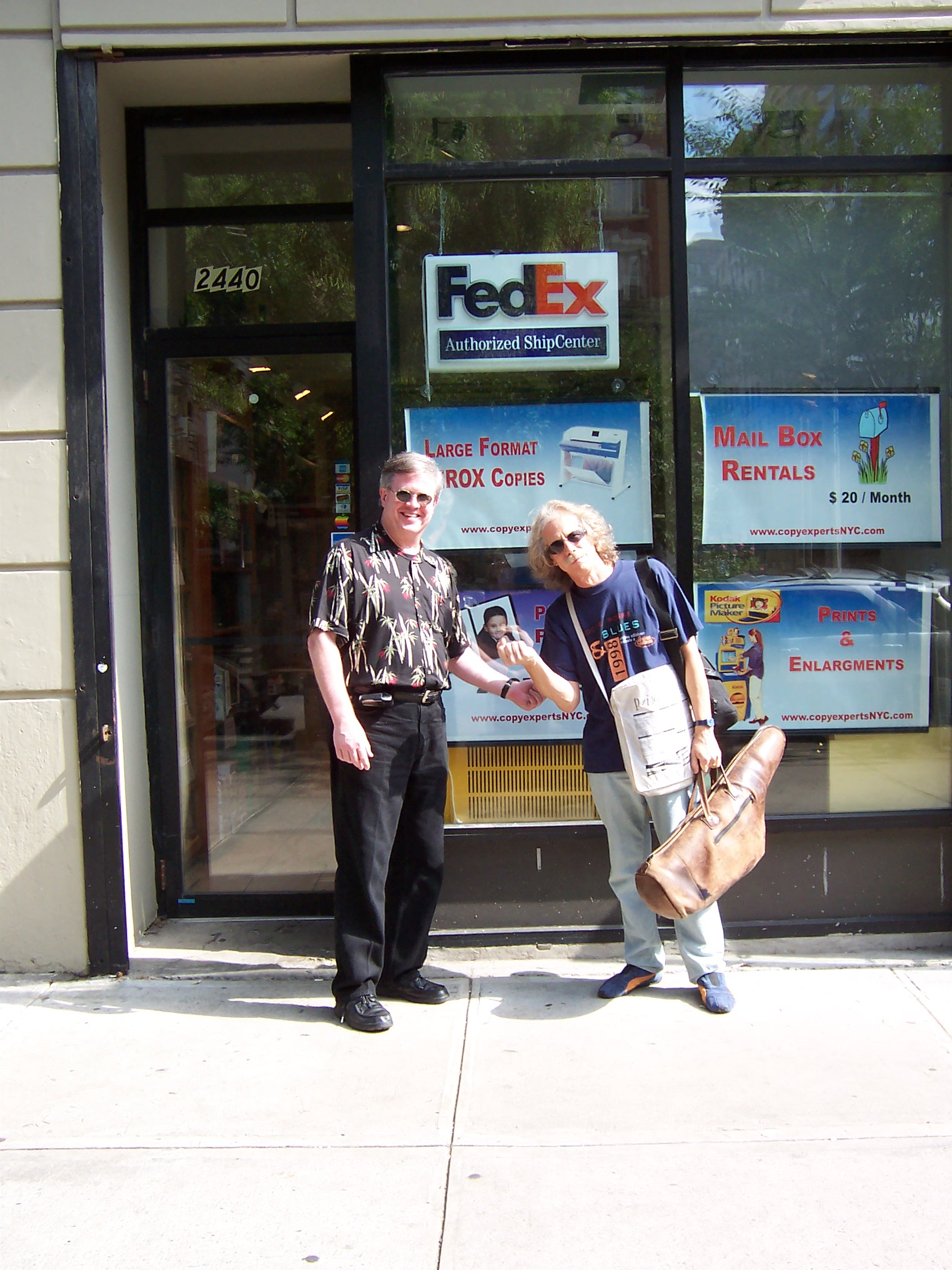
MCJO's founding director Ray Reach (left) with Lou Marini in New York, 2004.

To date, the MCJO has made recordings with saxophonist Lou Marini Jr. and trumpeter Lew Soloff. In 2001, the MCJO released a CD with "Blue Lou" Marini, titled Lou's Blues, which elicited favorable reviews. The group's personnel for Lou's Blues included:

- Founding Director: Ray Reach
- Woodwinds: Gary Hallquist, Gary Wheat, Neil McLean, Grady Chandler, Daniel Western and Kim Bain
- Trumpets: Mart Avant, Chris Gordon, John Taylor, Craig Konicek, Bo Berry and Darryl Jones
- Trombones: Steve Pryor, Edson Worden, Dr. Bob Black, Charles Ard, and Jim Moeller

The liner notes for this CD were written by Grammy Award-winning arranger and composer Bob Belden, who was formerly head of A & R (Artists and Repertoire) for Blue Note Records.

In addition, bass player Cleveland Eaton (formerly with the Ramsey Lewis Trio and the Count Basie Orchestra) performs with the band, as does Mike Williams (lead trumpeter with the Count Basie Orchestra) and "Blue" Lou Marini (of Saturday Night Live Band, Blues Brothers and Blood, Sweat and Tears fame).

Ray Reach, founding director of the MCJO recently (January, 2010) began work on a new recording to be released in the first quarter of 2011. The title of this recording is "Spinning Wheel - The Magic City Jazz Orchestra plays the music of Blood, Sweat and Tears." The CD will feature several former members of Blood, Sweat and Tears as soloists, including Lou Marini, Lew Soloff, Tom Malone and others.

== Discography ==
- UAB SuperJazz, Featuring Ellis Marsalis
- Lou's Blues, Lou Marini and the Magic City Jazz Orchestra.
- Live at WorkPlay, Lew Soloff and the Magic City Jazz Orchestra.
