= Ray Reach =

American musician (1948–2026)

- Born: Raymond Everett Reach, Jr. August 3, 1948; Birmingham, Alabama, U.S.
- Died: February 17, 2026 (aged 77) Montgomery, Alabama, U.S.
- Genres: Jazz; classical; pop; R&B; gospel; contemporary Christian; country
- Occupation: Musician
- Instruments: Keyboards; guitar; vocals
- Years active: 1964–2026
- Website: rayreach.com

Raymond Everett Reach Jr. (August 3, 1948 – February 17, 2026) was an American pianist, vocalist, guitarist, composer, arranger, music producer and educator, who was convicted in the State of Alabama on child pornography charges. Reach has performed and recorded in various genres, including pop, R&B, Motown/soul, gospel, rock, classic rock, country (contemporary and traditional), contemporary Christian, classical, and jazz music, but is perhaps best known for his work in jazz, combining jazz piano stylings with Sinatra-style vocals. He resided in Birmingham, Alabama.

== Career ==
Reach was a member of several active performing and recording groups, including the Magic City Jazz Orchestra (of which he was the founding director), the Ray Reach Orchestra, and the Night Flight Big Band.

As a composer, he wrote and arranged five Broadway-style musicals for Birmingham Children's Theatre: Rumplestiltskin, The Perfect Prince, The Bravo Bus, Backstage Baby, and Tuxedo Junction.

== Child pornography conviction and imprisonment ==
On April 23, 2018, Reach was arrested by U.S. Marshals in Alabama for the possession of child pornography. Reach was convicted May 15, 2025. Reach was sentenced on July 9, 2025, to 10 years split with two years to serve in prison followed by three years of unsupervised probation. He was also required to register as a sex offender.

== Death ==
Reach died at a hospital in Montgomery, Alabama on February 17, 2026, at the age of 77.

== Selected discography ==
As leader

- Especially for You (1994) - with Robert Dickson on bass, Alabama Jazz Hall of Fame inductee Sonny Harris on drums, and Gary Neil McLean on saxophone and flute.
- Have Yourself a Jazzy Little Christmas (2005) - with Sonny Harris on drums, Chris Wendle on bass and Gary Wheat on saxophone.

As vocalist, pianist, arranger and co-producer

- UAB SuperJazz, Featuring Ellis Marsalis (2001)

As producer

- Uncle Bud's Lectro Wood Experience
- Lou Marini and the Magic City Jazz Orchestra. Lou's Blues (2001)
