= Ray Charles in Concert =

In Concert

Compilation album by Ray Charles
- Released: 2003
- Recorded: Newport Jazz Festival (1958 July 5), Herndon Stadium Atlanta (1959 May 19), Sportpalast Berlin (1962 March 6), Shrine Auditorium Los Angeles (1964 September 20), Tokyo (1975 November 27) and Yokohama (1975 November 30)
- Genres: R&B, soul
- Length: 2 hours
- Label: Rhino Handmade
- Producers: Nesuhi Ertegun (Newport), Zenas Sears (Atlanta), Norman Granz (Berlin), Sid Feller (Los Angeles) and Ray Charles (Tokyo / Yokohama)

Ray Charles In Concert is a limited edition compilation album of live performances by Ray Charles released in 2003 by Rhino Handmade. The tracks were all previously released on 5 different Ray Charles live concert albums released between 1958 and 1975.

== Track listing ==
Disc one:

1. "Night Time Is the Right Time" (Ozzie Cadena, Lew Herman) – 3:58
2. "Talkin' 'Bout You" (Ray Charles) – 4:30
3. "A Fool for You" (Charles) – 7:05
4. "Swanee River Rock" (Charles) – 2:07
5. "The Spirit-Feel" (Milt Jackson) – 4:23
6. "Yes Indeed!" (Sy Oliver) – 2:39
7. "What'd I Say" (Charles) – 4:22
8. "Come Rain or Come Shine" (Johnny Mercer, Harold Arlen) – 7:40
9. "Hit the Road Jack" (Percy Mayfield) – 2:20
10. "The Danger Zone" (Mayfield) – 3:45
11. "Bye Bye Love" (Felice Bryant, Boudleaux Bryant) – 2:00
12. "Georgia On My Mind" (Hoagy Carmichael, Stuart Gorrell) – 6:16
13. "One Mint Julep" (Rudolph Toombs) – 3:01
14. "I Believe to my Soul" (Charles) – 3:50
15. "Unchain My Heart"(Teddy Powell, Robert Sharp Jr.) – 3:07
16. "Baby, Don't You Cry" (Johnson, Washington) – 2:42

Disc two:

1. "Hallelujah, I Love Her So" (Charles) – 3:00
2. "You Don't Know Me" (Eddy Arnold, Cindy Walker) – 3:10
3. "I Got a Woman" (Charles, Richard) – 6:11
4. "Hide nor Hair" (Mayfield) – 2:55
5. "Margie" (Con Conrad, Benny Davis, Russel Robinson) – 2:51
6. "Don't Set Me Free" (Powell) – 3:36
7. "Let the Good Times Roll" (Sam Theard, Fleecie Moore) – 3:09
8. "Busted" (Harlan Howard) – 2:10
9. "Don't Let Her Know" (Buck Owens, Don Rich, Bonnie Owens) – 4:23
10. "Then We'll Be Home" (Sadye Shepard) – 4:02
11. "I Can't Stop Loving You" (Don Gibson) – 3:15
12. "Feel So Bad" (Leslie Temple, James Johnsonl) – 9:57
13. "Living for the City" (Stevie Wonder) – 8:06

(Disc 1, tracks 1, 2, 3 originally released on Ray Charles at Newport)
(Disc 1, track 4 originally released on Ray Charles Live)
(Disc 1, tracks 5, 6, 7 originally released on Ray Charles in Person)
(Disc 1, tracks 8 ~ 15 originally released on Berlin, 1962)
(Disc 1, track 16 and disk 2, tracks 1 ~ 6 originally released on Ray Charles: Live in Concert)
(Disc 2, tracks 7 ~ 13 originally released on Ray Charles: Live in Japan)

== Personnel ==
=== 1958 Newport Jazz Festival performance ===
(Disk 1, tracks 1~4)

- Ray Charles – piano, vocals
- Marcus Belgrave – trumpet
- Lee Harper – trumpet
- David "Fathead" Newman – alto saxophone, tenor saxophone
- Bennie "Hank" Crawford – baritone saxophone
- Edgar Willis – bass
- Richie Goldberg – drums
- The Raeletts – backing vocals
  - Margie Hendrix
  - Pat Lyle
  - Darlene MacRea
- Nesuhi Ertegun – producer

=== 1959 Atlanta concert ===
(Disk 1, tracks 5~7)

- Ray Charles – piano, vocals, alto saxophone (on "The Spirit Feel")
- Margie Hendrix – vocals
- Marcus Belgrave – trumpet
- John Hunt – trumpet
- David "Fathead" Newman – alto saxophone, tenor saxophone
- Bennie "Hank" Crawford – baritone saxophone
- Edgar Willis – bass
- Teagle Fleming – drums
- The Raeletts – backing vocals
  - Margie Hendrix
  - Pat Lyle
  - Darlene MacRea
- Zenas Sears – producer

=== 1962 Berlin concert ===
(Disk 1, tracks 8 ~ 15)

- Ray Charles – piano, vocals
- Marcus Belgrave – trumpet
- Wallace Davenport – trumpet
- Philip Guilbeau – trumpet
- John Hunt – trumpet
- Henderson Chambers – trombone
- James Harbert – trombone
- Frederic "Keg" Johnson – trombone
- Dickie Wells – trombone
- Bennie "Hank" Crawford – alto saxophone
- Rudy Powell – alto saxophone
- David "Fathead" Newman – tenor saxophone, alto saxophone, flute
- Don Wilkerson – tenor saxophone
- Leroy "Hog" Cooper – baritone saxophone
- Elbert "Sonny" Forriest – guitar
- Edgar Willis – bass
- Edward "Bruno" Carr – drums
- The Raeletts – backing vocals
  - Gwen Berry
  - Margie Hendrix
  - Pat Lyle
  - Darlene MacRea
- Norman Granz – producer

=== 1964 Los Angeles concert ===
(Disk 1, track 16 and disk 2, tracks 1 ~ 6)

- Ray Charles – piano, vocals
- Oliver Beener – trumpet
- Wallace Davenport – trumpet
- Philip Guilbeau – trumpet
- John Hunt – trumpet, flugelhorn
- Henderson Chambers – trombone
- James Harbert – trombone
- Frederic "Keg" Johnson – trombone
- Julian Priester – trombone
- Bennie "Hank" Crawford – alto saxophone
- William "Buddy" Pearson – alto saxophone, flute
- David "Fathead" Newman – tenor saxophone
- Leroy "Hog" Cooper – baritone saxophone
- Elbert "Sonny" Forriest – guitar
- Edgar Willis – bass
- Wilbert Hogan – drums
- The Raeletts – backing vocals
  - Gwen Berry
  - Lillian Forte
  - Pat Lyle
  - Darlene MacRae
- Sid Feller – producer

=== 1975 Tokyo and Yokohama concerts ===
(Disk 2, tracks 7 ~ 13)

- Ray Charles – piano, vocals, producer
- Bob Caulsen – trumpet
- Johnny Coles – trumpet
- Jack Evans – trumpet
- Steve Davis – trombone
- Wally Huff – trombone
- Ken Tussing – trombone
- Eddie Pratt – alto saxophone
- Clifford Solomon – alto saxophone
- James Clay – tenor saxophone
- Andrew Ennis – tenor saxophone
- Leroy "Hog" Cooper – baritone saxophone
- Earnest Vantrease – organ
- Tony Mathews – guitar
- Edgar Willis – bass
- Scott von Ravensberg – drums
- The Raeletts – backing vocals
  - Susaye Greene
  - Mable John
  - Vernita Moss
  - Estelle Yarborough
