= Ray Charles Live =

Live

Live album by Ray Charles
- Released: 1973
- Recorded: July 5, 1958 (Newport); May 28, 1959 (Atlanta)
- Genre: Soul, R&B
- Length: 71:55
- Label: Atlantic
- Producer: Nesuhi Ertegün, Zenas Sears

Ray Charles chronology
From the Pages of My Mind (1986)	Live (1973)	Just Between Us (1988)

Professional ratings
Review scores
Source	Rating
AllMusic	4.5/5 stars
RS Album Guide	5/5 stars
The Penguin Guide to Blues Recordings	3.5/4 stars

Ray Charles Live is a double LP compilation album by Ray Charles, released by Atlantic Records in 1973. It consists of live concert recordings previously released on Ray Charles at Newport and Ray Charles in Person (recorded at the Newport Jazz Festival in 1958 and at Herndon Stadium in Atlanta in 1959, respectively). Later CD re-issues of this compilation include an additional, previously unreleased, track from the 1958 Newport concert, "Swanee River Rock".

== Reception and legacy ==
The Penguin Guide to Blues Recordings describes Ray Charles Live as “a wonderfully vivid live album, regardless of genre.”

== Track listing ==
LP 1 (Newport concert)
side one

1. "The Right Time" (Herman) – 4:06
2. "In a Little Spanish Town" (Lewis/Wayne/Young) – 3:47
3. "I Got a Woman" (Charles) – 6:24
4. "Blues Waltz" (Roach) – 6:29

side two

1. "Hot Rod" (Charles) – 3:43
2. "Talkin' 'bout You" (Charles) – 4:26
3. "Sherry" (Crawford) – 4:18
4. "A Fool for You" (Charles) – 7:15

LP 2 (Atlanta concert)
side three

1. "The Right Time" (Herman) – 4:19
2. "What'd I Say" (Charles) – 4:01
3. "Yes Indeed!" (Oliver) – 2:23
4. "The Spirit-Feel" (Jackson) – 4:08

side four

1. "Frenesi" (Charles/Dominguez/Russell) – 4:58
2. "Drown in My Own Tears" (Glover) – 6:12
3. "Tell the Truth" (Pauling) – 2:46

additional bonus track on later CD re-issues (recorded 1958 at Newport):

"Swanee River Rock" (Charles) – 2:05

Much of the Herndon Stadium audience reaction and the compere's final comments "... Ray Charles, the High Priest — What a show! What a show!", are clearly heard in the Ray Charles in Person LP, but not evident in the CD release.

== Personnel ==
- Ray Charles – keyboards, vocals, alto saxophone
- Marcus Belgrave – trumpet
- Lee Harper – trumpet (Newport tracks only)
- John Hunt – trumpet (Atlanta tracks only)
- David "Fathead" Newman – tenor saxophone
- Bennie "Hank" Crawford – baritone saxophone
- Edgar Willis – bass
- Richie Goldberg – drums (Newport)
- Teagle Fleming – drums (Atlanta)
- Marjorie Hendricks – vocals
- The Raeletts – vocal group
