= The Genius Hits the Road =

Studio album by Ray Charles
- Released: September 1960
- Recorded: March 25 and 29, 1960
- Studio: New York City
- Genre: R&B; blues; jazz
- Length: 33:37
- Label: ABC-Paramount
- Producer: Sid Feller

Ray Charles chronology
Ray Charles in Person (1960)	The Genius Hits the Road (1960)	Dedicated to You (1961)

Professional ratings
Review scores
Source	Rating
AllMusic	3.5/5 stars

The Genius Hits the Road is a 1960 album by Ray Charles. The concept album focuses on songs written about various parts of the United States. It peaked at number nine on the pop album charts and produced a US No. 1 single, "Georgia on My Mind".

== Track listing ==
=== Original LP release ===
Side 1

1. "Alabamy Bound" (Buddy DeSylva, Bud Green, Ray Henderson) – 1:55
2. "Georgia on My Mind" (Hoagy Carmichael, Stuart Gorrell) – 3:35
3. "Basin Street Blues" (Spencer Williams) – 2:46
4. "Mississippi Mud" (Harry Barris, James Cavanaugh) – 3:24
5. "Moonlight In Vermont" (John Blackburn, Karl Suessdorf) – 3:02
6. "New York's My Home" (Gordon Jenkins) – 3:05

Side 2

1. "California, Here I Come" (Buddy DeSylva, Al Jolson, Joseph Meyer) – 2:10
2. "Moon Over Miami" (Joe Burke, Edgar Leslie) – 3:20
3. "Deep in the Heart of Texas" (June Hershey, Don Swander) – 2:28
4. "Carry Me Back to Old Virginny" (James A. Bland) – 2:02
5. "Blue Hawaii" (Ralph Rainger, Leo Robin) – 2:58
6. "Chattanooga Choo Choo" (Mack Gordon, Harry Warren) – 3:05

=== 1997 Rhino CD re-issue bonus tracks ===
13. "Sentimental Journey" (Les Brown, Green, Ben Homer) – 2:58
14. "Hit the Road Jack" (Percy Mayfield) – 2:00
15. "Blue Moon of Kentucky" (Bill Monroe) – 2:12
16. "Rainy Night in Georgia" (Tony Joe White) – 6:16
17. "I'm Movin' On" (Hank Snow) – 2:29
18. "Swanee River Rock (Talkin' 'Bout That River)" (Ray Charles) – 2:20
19. "Lonely Avenue" (Doc Pomus) – 2:34

=== 2009 Concord CD re-issue bonus tracks ===
13. "Hit the Road Jack" (Mayfield) – 2:00
14. "Sentimental Journey" (Brown, Green, Homer) – 2:58
15. "Blue Moon of Kentucky" (Monroe) – 2:13
16. "Rainy Night in Georgia" (White) – 6:16
17. "The Long and Winding Road" (Lennon, McCartney) – 3:14
18. "I Was on Georgia Time" (Charles) – 3:28
19. "Take Me Home, Country Roads" (Danoff, Denver, Nivert) – 3:34

== Personnel ==
- Ray Charles – vocals, piano
- Edgar Willis – bass
- Milt Turner – drums
- David "Fathead" Newman – tenor saxophone
- Hank Crawford – alto saxophone
- Leroy Cooper – baritone saxophone
- John Hunt – trumpet
- Marcus Belgrave – trumpet
- Ralph Burns – arranger, conductor
- Sid Feller – producer

=== 1997 Rhino CD re-issue bonus track personnel ===
- Ray Charles – piano, vocals
- Edgar Willis – bass (tracks 14, 17, 18)
- Roosevelt Sheffield – bass (track 19)
- Mel Lewis – drums (track 14)
- Teagle Fleming – drums (tracks 17)
- William Peeples – drums (tracks 18, 19)
- David "Fathead" Newman – tenor saxophone (tracks 14, 17 to 19), alto saxophone (tracks 18, 19)
- Hank Crawford – alto saxophone (tracks 14, 17), baritone saxophone (track 17)
- Leroy Cooper – baritone saxophone (track 14)
- Emmet Dennis – baritone saxophone (tracks 18, 19)
- John Hunt – trumpet (tracks 14, 17, 19)
- Marcus Belgrave – trumpet (track 17)
- Joe Bridgewater – trumpet (tracks: 18, 19)
- The Raelettes – vocals (tracks 15, 17, 19)
- The Jack Halloran singers – vocals (track 15)
- The Cookies – vocals (track 19)
- Frank Rosolino – trombone (track 14)
- Harry Betts – trombone (track 14)
- Kenny Shroyer – trombone (track 14)
- Richard Nash – trombone (track 14)
- Bruno Carr – percussion (track 14)
- Ahmet Ertegün – producer (tracks 17, 18 19)
- Jerry Wexler – producer (tracks 17, 18 19)
