= Ray (soundtrack) =

Soundtrack album by Ray Charles
- Released: June 2004
- Recorded: 1953–2003
- Length: 54:28
- Label: Rhino/Atlantic/Warner Music Group
- Producer: Ahmet Ertegun, Herb Abramson

Ray is the soundtrack to the 2004 film Ray starring Jamie Foxx (who won the Academy Award for Best Actor for his role as "Ray Charles" in this film), Kerry Washington, Terrence Howard, Clifton Powell and Regina King. The score was composed by Breyon Prescott and Craig Armstrong.

The album won a Grammy Award and was nominated for the BAFTA Award for Best Film Music.

== Track listing ==
1. "Mess Around" – 2:41
2. "I've Got a Woman" – 2:52
3. "Hallelujah I Love Her So" (Live) – 3:05
4. "Drown in My Own Tears" – 3:21
5. "(Night Time Is) The Right Time" – 3:24
6. "Mary Ann" – 2:47
7. "Hard Times (No One Knows Better Than I)" – 2:55
8. "What'd I Say" (Live) – 4:38
9. "Georgia on My Mind" – 3:39
10. "Hit the Road Jack" – 2:00
11. "Unchain My Heart" – 2:50
12. "I Can't Stop Loving You" (Live) – 3:17
13. "Born to Lose" – 3:15
14. "Bye Bye Love" – 2:11
15. "You Don't Know Me" (Live) – 3:16
16. "Let the Good Times Roll" (Live) – 2:48
17. "Georgia on My Mind" (Live) – 5:30
- Total Time: 54:28

A second CD, More Music from Ray, featuring more music from the film along with "music that inspired the film", was released on Atlantic Records.

== Charts ==
=== Weekly charts ===
Chart (2004–05)	Peak position
Australian Albums (ARIA)	7
Austrian Albums (Ö3 Austria)	3
Belgian Albums (Ultratop Flanders)	3
Belgian Albums (Ultratop Wallonia)	6
Canadian Albums (Nielsen SoundScan)	11
Canadian R&B Albums (Nielsen SoundScan)	3
Dutch Albums (Album Top 100)	8
Finnish Albums (Suomen virallinen lista)	32
French Albums (SNEP)	2
German Albums (Offizielle Top 100)	12
Hungarian Albums (MAHASZ)	37
Irish Albums (IRMA)	19
Italian Albums (FIMI)	11
New Zealand Albums (RMNZ)	3
Norwegian Albums (VG-lista)	39
Scottish Albums (OCC)	60
Spanish Albums (Promusicae)	12
Swedish Albums (Sverigetopplistan)	51
Swiss Albums (Schweizer Hitparade)	2
UK Albums (OCC)	36
US Billboard 200	9
US Top R&B/Hip-Hop Albums (Billboard)	7
US Soundtrack Albums (Billboard)	1

=== Year-end charts ===
Chart (2005)	Position
Australian Albums (ARIA)	79
Austrian Albums (Ö3 Austria)	45
Dutch Albums (Album Top 100)	91
French Albums (SNEP)	43
German Albums (Offizielle Top 100)	63
Swiss Albums (Schweizer Hitparade)	24
US Billboard 200	43
US Top R&B/Hip-Hop Albums (Billboard)	37

== Certifications and sales ==
Region	Certification	Certified units/sales
Australia (ARIA)	Gold	35,000^{^}
New Zealand (RMNZ)	Platinum	15,000^{^}
United Kingdom (BPI)	Gold	100,000^{‡}
United States (RIAA)	Platinum	1,000,000^{^}
^{^} Shipments figures based on certification alone.^{‡} Sales+streaming figures based on certification alone.
