= Ray Charles in Person =

Live album by Ray Charles
- Released: July 1960
- Recorded: May 28, 1959
- Venue: Herndon Stadium, Morris Brown College, Atlanta, Georgia
- Genre: R&B
- Length: 29:19
- Label: Atlantic
- Producer: Zenas "Daddy" Sears

Ray Charles chronology
The Genius of Ray Charles (1959)	Ray Charles in Person (1960)	The Genius Hits the Road (1960)

Re-issue cover
- 1987 re-issue / compilation

Professional ratings
Review scores
Source	Rating
AllMusic	4.5/5 stars

Ray Charles in Person is a 1960 live album recorded by American singer and pianist Ray Charles on May 28, 1959, on a rainy night in Atlanta, Georgia, at Morris Brown College's Herndon Stadium. All tracks from this album together with those from Ray Charles at Newport were also released on the 1987 Atlantic compilation CD Ray Charles Live.

== Overview ==
The album was recorded by the concert sponsor, radio station WAOK. The station's lead disk jockey, Zenas "Daddy" Sears, recorded the album for the audience using a single microphone. The album is noted for its technical excellence in balancing band, singer, and audience, and also for its documentation of the jazzy R&B Ray Charles sound prior to his great crossover success. The album was inducted into the Grammy Hall of Fame in 1999.

== Chart performance ==
The album debuted on Billboard magazine's Top LP's chart in the issue dated July 24, 1960, peaking at No. 13 during a thirty-seven-week run on the chart.

== Track listing ==
1. "The Right Time" (Lew Herman, Nappy Brown, Ozzie Cadena)
2. "What'd I Say" (Ray Charles)
3. "Yes, Indeed" (Sy Oliver)
4. "The Spirit Feel" (Milt Jackson)
5. "Frenesi" (Alberto Domínguez)
6. "Drown in My Own Tears" (Henry Glover)
7. "Tell The Truth" (Lowman Pauling)

== Personnel ==
- Ray Charles – keyboards, vocals
- Marcus Belgrave – trumpet
- John Hunt – trumpet
- David "Fathead" Newman – tenor saxophone, alto saxophone
- Hank Crawford – alto saxophone, baritone saxophone
- Edgar Willis – bass
- Teagle Fleming – drums
- Marjorie Hendricks – vocals on "The Right Time" and "Tell The Truth"
- The Raelettes – backing vocals

The track "Yes, Indeed" was recorded live at the Newport Jazz Festival on July 5, 1958, with Lee Harper replacing John Hunt on trumpet and Richie Goldberg replacing Teagle Fleming on drums.

Technical

- Ivan Miles – recording engineer
- Lee Friedlander – cover photography

== Charts ==
Chart (1960)	Peak position
US Billboard Top LPs (Mono Action Albums)	13
