= Right Now! (Howard Johnson album) =

Studio album by Howard Johnson and Gravity featuring Taj Mahal
- Released: 1997
- Recorded: December 1–3, 5, 9–10, 1996
- Studio: Manhattan Center Studios, New York City
- Genre: Jazz
- Length: 1:00:57
- Label: Verve; 314 537 801-2
- Producer: Suzi Reynolds

Howard Johnson chronology
| Gravity!!! (1996) | Right Now! (1997) | Testimony (2017) |

Right Now! is an album by multi-instrumentalist Howard Johnson and his band Gravity, with guest vocalist Taj Mahal appearing on three tracks. Johnson's third release as a leader, it was recorded during December 1996 at Manhattan Center Studios in New York City, and was issued in 1997 by Verve Records. On the album, Johnson is joined by tubists Dave Bargeron, Joseph Daley, Nedra Johnson, Carl Kleinsteuber, Earl McIntyre, and Bob Stewart, pianist Ray Chew, double bassist James Cammack, and drummer Kenwood Dennard.

== Reception ==
Professional ratings
Review scores
| Source | Rating |
|---|---|
| AllMusic | 4/5 stars |
| The Penguin Guide to Jazz | 4/4 stars |

In a review for AllMusic, Richard S. Ginell called the album "elegant fun," and wrote: "The idea of a tuba sextet might seem a bit too daffy a defiance of the laws of gravity, but Hojo's ensemble... comes up with some surprisingly mellifluous textures... The tuba harmonies oddly often bear a pleasing kinship with those of Steve Turre's massed conch shells, and the shadow of Gil Evans is everywhere."

The authors of The Penguin Guide to Jazz Recordings awarded the album a full four stars, and stated: "Opening with Charles Tolliver's 'Right Now' was a master-stroke. What follows is equally enterprising.... The arrangements are tighter and more adventurous than ever; the other brassmen in the band are exceptional players and idiosyncratic enough not to sound homogenized; Suzi Reynolds's production work is first rate."

Bob Blumenthal of The Atlantic described the album as "a spirited, wide-ranging program that proves that even the lowest instrumental voices can soar." He commented: "Johnson is deservedly the star. He arranged all the music, spreading the voicings in a manner that best takes advantage of the range and dexterity of his partners, and he roars through his several tuba solos."

Writing for All About Jazz, Jim Santella noted that the band provides "a pleasant harmony" as well as "varied excitement and expression," and remarked: "The enthusiasm, soulful expression, and a professional approach to the tuba's role, combine to make Gravity's session welcome for those who appreciate mainstream jazz. Highly recommended."

== Track listing ==
1. "Right Now" (Charles Tolliver) – 9:19
2. "It's Getting Harder to Survive" (Ronnie Barron) – 9:25
3. "Tell Me a Bedtime Story" (Herbie Hancock) – 3:37
4. "Frame for the Blues" (Slide Hampton) – 5:50
5. "Don't Let the Sun Catch You Cryin'" (Joe Greene) – 5:58
6. "Ma-ma" (Caiphus Semenya) – 7:35
7. "Svengali's Summer / Waltz" (Gil Evans) – 10:27
8. "Fever" (Little Willie John) – 2:47
9. "O Raggedy Man" (Howard Johnson) – 5:59

== Personnel ==
- Howard Johnson – tuba, baritone saxophone, penny whistle, vocals
- Taj Mahal – vocals (tracks 2, 5, 8)
- Dave Bargeron – tuba
- Joseph Daley – tuba
- Nedra Johnson – tuba
- Carl Kleinsteuber – tuba
- Earl McIntyre – tuba
- Bob Stewart – tuba
- Ray Chew – piano, synthesizer
- James Cammack – double bass
- Kenwood Dennard – drums
