= Velvet Brown =

American tubist

Velvet Brown is a distinguished American tubist and euphonium player, currently serving as the David P. Stoner Endowed Professor of Tuba and Euphonium at Pennsylvania State University as well as the Associate Director of the School of Music for Equity, Diversity, and Inclusion. She also holds a selective studio at the Peabody Institute of the Johns Hopkins University. Prior, she taught at Bowling Green State University as well as Ball State University. Since joining Penn State in 2003, she has also taken on the role of Associate Director of the School of Music for Equity, Diversity, and Inclusion. Additionally, she holds a faculty position at the Peabody Institute of Johns Hopkins University

== Life and career ==
Before her tenure at Penn State, Brown taught at Bowling Green State University (Ohio), Ball State University (Indiana), and served as Associate Director of University Bands at Boston University. She is a founding board member of the International Women’s Brass Conference and has served on the board of directors for the International Tuba Euphonium Association, including as secretary from 2001 to 2007. In 1999–2000, she was honored with the William Fulbright Fellowship Vinciguerra Award.

Brown enjoys a multifaceted career as an international soloist, chamber musician, recording artist, conductor, and orchestral performer. She has performed and taught across Europe, Asia, and North America, including countries such as Italy, Switzerland, Austria, Germany, Finland, France, England, Hungary, Slovenia, Russia, Japan, Cuba, Canada, and the United States. She is currently the principal tubist of the New Hampshire Music Festival Orchestra and has previously held principal positions with the Altoona Symphony Orchestra and the River City Brass Band. Her orchestral engagements also include performances with the Detroit Symphony, Saint Louis Symphony, San Francisco Women’s Philharmonic, and the Fort Wayne Philharmonic.

In the jazz realm, Brown has been the lead tubist with Howard Johnson’s “Gravity” Tuba Jazz Ensemble since 2004, contributing to the 2017 album Testimony . She is also a founding member of several ensembles, including the Monarch Brass Quintet and Brass Ensemble, the Junction Tuba Quartet, the Pennsylvania Brassworks, Boston Brass, and the Stiletto Brass Quintet.

Brown co-founded MOJATUBA: Tuba and Dance Fusion Project, which blends modern dance, original compositions, jazz styles, and African influences. She serves as the Artistic Director of the Tuba and Euphonium Fest for Orvieto Music in Orvieto, Italy, and has previously directed the Chromatic Brass Collective. In 2021, she performed as principal tuba with the Hope and Harmony Ensemble for the U.S. Presidential Inauguration conducted by Marin Alsop

== Discography ==
=== Solo recordings ===
- 1998 - Velvet Brown, Tuba (Crystal), tuba solo and piano
- 2001 - Music for Velvet (Crystal), tuba solo and piano
- 2005 - Perspectives in Rhythm (Crystal), tuba solo and percussion ensemble
- 2011 - Simply Velvet (Potenza), tuba solo and piano

=== Other recordings ===
- 2000 - Heart of a Wolf (Nicolai Music)
  - Solo tuba and tuba/euphonium duet
- 2003 - Monarch Brass (2003)
  - Monarch Brass Ensemble and Brass Quintet
- 2004 - New Music From Bowling Green, Vol. 3 (Albany)
  - Concerto for Tuba and Orchestra by John Williams with the Bowling Green Philharmonia
- 2017 - Testimony (Tuscarora)
  - Howard Johnson and Gravity
