= Ray Charles at Newport =

Live album by Ray Charles
- Released: November 1958
- Recorded: July 5, 1958
- Venues: Newport Jazz Festival, Newport, Rhode Island
- Genre: R&B
- Length: 40:28
- Label: Atlantic
- Producer: Tom Dowd (engineer)

Ray Charles chronology
Yes Indeed! (1958)	Ray Charles at Newport (1958)	What'd I Say (1959)

Re-issue cover
- 1987 re-issue/compilation

Professional ratings
Review scores
Source	Rating
AllMusic	4.5/5 stars

Ray Charles at Newport is a 1958 live album of Ray Charles' July 5, 1958, performance at the Newport Jazz Festival. The detailed liner notes on the album were written by Kenneth Lee Karpe. All tracks from this Newport album, along with all tracks from his 1959 Herndon Stadium performance in Atlanta, were also released on the Atlantic compilation LP Ray Charles Live. A later CD reissue of that compilation album included a previously unissued song from the 1958 Newport concert, "Swanee River Rock".

== Track listing ==
All tracks composed by Ray Charles, except where indicated

Side A
No.	Title	Writer(s)	Length
1.	"Night Time Is the Right Time"	Ozzie Cadena, Lew Herman	4:06
2.	"In a Little Spanish Town"	Sam Lewis, Mabel Wayne, Joe Young	3:47
3.	"I Got a Woman"	Ray Charles, Renald Richard	6:24
4.	"Blues Waltz"	Max Roach	6:29

Side B
No.	Title	Writer(s)	Length
1.	"Hot Rod"		3:43
2.	"Talkin' 'bout You"		4:26
3.	"Sherry"	Hank Crawford	4:18
4.	"A Fool for You"		7:15
Total length:			40:28

== Personnel ==
- Ray Charles – keyboards, piano, alto saxophone, lead vocals
- Marcus Belgrave – trumpet
- Lee Harper – trumpet
- David "Fathead" Newman – tenor saxophone
- Bennie Crawford – alto saxophone, baritone saxophone
- Edgar Willis – bass
- Richie Goldberg – drums
- Marjorie Hendricks – vocals on "The Right Time"
- The Raelettes – backing vocals

Technical

- Tom Dowd, Harold Chapman – recording engineer
- Marvin Israel – cover design
- Lee Friedlander – cover photography
