= Testimony (Howard Johnson album) =

Studio album by Howard Johnson and Gravity
- Released: 2017
- Studios: MSR Studios, New York City
- Genre: Jazz
- Length: 53:33
- Labels: Tuscarora Records; 17001
- Producer: Joseph Daley

Howard Johnson chronology
Right Now! (1998)	Testimony (2017)

Testimony is an album by multi-instrumentalist Howard Johnson and his band Gravity. Johnson's fourth and final release as a leader, it was recorded at the MSR Studios in New York City, and was issued in 2017 by Tuscarora Records. On the album, Johnson is joined by tubists Velvet Brown, Dave Bargeron, Earl McIntyre, Joseph Daley, and Bob Stewart, pianist Carlton Holmes, double bassist Melissa Slocum, and drummer Buddy Williams. This recording also features guest appearances by vocalist Nedra Johnson (Howard Johnson's daughter), tubist Joe Exley, and background vocalists CJ Wright, Butch Watson, and Mem Nahadr.

== Reception ==
Professional ratings
Review scores
Source	Rating
All About Jazz	3.5/5 stars
All About Jazz	4/5 stars
All About Jazz	3.5/5 stars
Audiophile Audition	4/5 stars
DownBeat	3/5 stars
Tom Hull – on the Web	B+

In a review for DownBeat, Martin Longley called the album "a harmonious engagement between the 75-year-old Johnson and five low-brass allies," and noted that the "blending of measured ego, tubas off-the-leash and a varied repertoire delivers an album of many facets, most of them highly satisfying to all low-brass aficionados."

Jack Bowers of All About Jazz wrote: "While Gravity... may be too weighty for some, it clearly shows that the tuba, when placed in the proper hands, is a more versatile instrument than is often presumed, capable of much more than background oom-pahs and able, in this case, to carry an entire album on its ponderous back. Hearing is believing." AAJ's Roger Farbey commented: "One important factor of this recording... is that despite the challenges posed by the sheer immensity of the instrument, the tuba is more than capable of successfully executing both lead and improvisational roles. When these staggeringly proportioned brass instruments perform in an ensemble arrangement as heard here, confounding all expectations and maybe even the laws of physics, the effect is like a veritable modern-day nuclear-powered Birth of the Cool."

Writing for Jazz Weekly, George W. Harris praised the album's "amazingly rich and glorious harmonies," but noted that "when the times come for the tuba to solo, it tends to get a bit drowned out for the simple reason of its difficulty to be as dynamically expressive as a smaller brass horn or reed."

In an article for Contemporary Fusion Reviews, Dick Metcalf awarded the album his "most highly recommended" rating and his "'pick' for 'best jazz tuba album - ever'!" He remarked: "I can guarantee you that your ears will be jumpin' right along with every beat as you listen to the sheer joy Howard projects."

Audiophile Audition's Fritz Balwit stated: "This is a record of great charm and vigor. Setting aside what it takes to become a tuba virtuoso, the amount of work put into these ensemble arrangements is worthy of highest commendation. It is also the uncontested winner in the 'biggest bottom' category."

Seth Rogovoy of Chronogram wrote: "Suspend all preconceptions of what the tuba can do... and you will be more than pleasantly surprised. Far from being limited to providing the bass line in a brass band or portraying Tubby in an orchestra, the tuba becomes a vessel of expansive tonality, and, in genius/visionary Johnson's hands, a medium of masterful improvisation equal to any trumpet."

Writer Raul Da Gama commented: "Testimony is a glorious sermon and sounds as great to preach as it is to listen to. Its music plunges into the depths of the indigo blues and flies off the pulpit... The musical chemistry between the tubas and between the tubas and piano, bass... and drums is entirely intuitive and gratifying... In the scheme of things Blues and Jazz, this is a High Mass; a going to church, a brassy 'Hallelujah' chorale; trance-like exhilaration as never before."

== Track listing ==
1. "Testimony" (Howard Johnson) – 6:04
2. "Working Hard for the Joneses" (Nedra Johnson) – 4:12
3. "Fly With the Wind" (McCoy Tyner) – 11:16
4. "Natural Woman" (Carole King, Gerry Goffin, Jerry Wexler) – 4:51
5. "High Priest" (McCoy Tyner) – 6:19
6. "Little Black Lucille" (Howard Johnson) – 6:22
7. "Evolution" (Bob Neloms) – 8:55
8. "Way Back Home" (Wilton Felder) – 5:34

== Personnel ==
- Howard Johnson – BB♭ tuba, F tuba, baritone saxophone, penny whistle

Gravity

- Velvet Brown – F tuba
- Dave Bargeron – E♭ tuba
- Earl McIntyre – E♭ tuba
- Joseph Daley – BB♭ tuba
- Bob Stewart – CC tuba
- Carlton Holmes – piano
- Melissa Slocum – double bass
- Buddy Williams – drums

Guests

- Nedra Johnson – lead vocals (track 2)
- Joe Exley – CC tuba (tracks 1, 5, 6, 7, 8)
- CJ Wright, Butch Watson, Mem Nahadr – background vocals (track 2)
