= More Soul =

Studio album by Hank Crawford
- Released: 1961
- Recorded: October 7, 1960
- Genre: Jazz
- Length: 38:10
- Label: Atlantic
- Producer: Nesuhi Ertegun

Hank Crawford chronology
More Soul (1961)	The Soul Clinic (1961)

More Soul is an album by jazz saxophonist Hank Crawford. Atlantic Records released the album in 1961. More Soul is Crawford's first album as a leader, recorded on October 7, 1960 while he was the music director in Ray Charles' group. Charles provided the arrangement for the track "The Story."

== Critical reception ==
Professional ratings
Review scores
Source	Rating
Allmusic	3.5/5 stars
Penguin Guide to Jazz	3/4 stars
DownBeat	5/5 stars

Thom Jurek of allmusic gives the album a three-and-a-half star rating (of a possible five), noting that "[t]he material is swinging, front-ended, soul-inflected hard bop with tunes arranged by Crawford" and that "Crawford's tone as a soloist is sweet yet edgy and raw, full of emotion and warmth." The Penguin Guide to Jazz describes the album as "sonorous and churchy in the Brother Ray mode…" and gives the album a three-star rating (of a possible four).

In his five-star 1961 review for DownBeat, Ralph J. Gleason praised the album, saying, "I played it more than 20 times in the first 48 hours it was in my possession." He called it "one of the very best small-band albums in years and by all odds the best one this year."

== Track listing ==
All titles arranged by Hank Crawford, except where indicated.

No.	Title	Writer(s)	Length
1.	"Boo's Tune"	Moody	6:41
2.	"Angel Eyes"	Dennis, Brent	6:34
3.	"Four Five Six"	Crawford	5:09
4.	"The Story" (Charles, arr.)	Moody	4:43
5.	"Dat Dere"	Timmons, Brown	4:53
6.	"Misty"	Garner, Burke	5:34
7.	"Sister Sadie"	Silver	4:36

== Personnel ==
- Hank Crawford – alto saxophone, piano
- David "Fathead" Newman – tenor saxophone
- Leroy "Hog" Cooper – baritone saxophone
- Phillip Guilbeau – trumpet
- John Hunt – flugelhorn, trumpet
- Edgar Willis – bass
- Milt Turner – drums

== Production ==
- Nesuhi Ertegun – producer
- Tom Dowd – engineer
- Phil Iehle – engineer
- Gary Kramer – liner notes
- Lee Friedlander – photography
- Loring Eutemey – cover design
