= Gravity!!! =

Studio album by Howard Johnson and Gravity
- Released: 1996
- Studio: Clinton Recording Studios, New York City
- Genre: Jazz
- Length: 1:04:34
- Label: Verve; 314 531 021-2
- Producer: Howard Johnson, Suzi Reynolds

Howard Johnson chronology
Arrival: A Pharoah Sanders Tribute (1995)	Gravity!!! (1996)	Right Now! (1997)

Gravity!!! is an album by multi-instrumentalist Howard Johnson and his band Gravity. Johnson's second release as a leader, it was recorded at Clinton Recording Studios in New York City, and was issued in 1996 by Verve Records. On the album, Johnson is joined by tubists Dave Bargeron, Joseph Daley, Nedra Johnson, Carl Kleinsteuber, Tom Malone, Earl McIntyre, Marcus Rojas, and Bob Stewart, guitarist Georg Wadenius, pianists Ray Chew, Paul Shaffer, and James Williams, double bassists Bob Cranshaw and Melissa Slocum, drummers Kenwood Dennard and Kenny Washington, and percussionist Victor See Yuen.

== Reception ==
Professional ratings
Review scores
Source	Rating
AllMusic	4.5/5 stars
MusicHound Jazz	4/5 stars
The Penguin Guide to Jazz	3.5/4 stars
The Virgin Encyclopedia of Jazz	3/5 stars

In a review for AllMusic, Scott Yanow wrote: "Imagine a group that consists of piano, bass, drums, and five to seven tubas... Despite the instrumentation, the group plays the music... with swing, creativity, and more variety than one might expect."

The authors of The Penguin Guide to Jazz Recordings stated that, in comparison with Johnson's debut album, Gravity!!! was "a big step forward," and commented: "There was never any doubt that Johnson and his fellow-tubists had the vision and the chops to avoid a one-dimensional sound and approach."

Writing for All About Jazz, Jim Santella remarked: "the tuba has its place in music: the rhythm, the pulse, the bottom harmony. But in the hands of 55-year-old Johnson and his five tuba-mates, plus rhythm section, the instrument becomes a melody-maker... Light on their feet, each of the tuba masters takes solo spots that swing hard show their individuality... Recommended."

W. Kim Heron of MusicHound Jazz described the album as "direct, soulful, and swinging, despite the big brass ballast."

== Track listing ==
1. "Big Alice" (Don Pullen) – 9:07
2. "Stolen Moments" (Oliver Nelson) – 7:53
3. "'Way 'Cross Georgia" (Coleridge-Taylor Perkinson) – 5:35
4. "Kelly Blue" (Wynton Kelly) – 12:13
5. "Be No Evil" (Howard Johnson) – 3:18
6. "Yesterdays" (Jerome Kern, Otto Harbach) – 11:08
7. "Here Comes Sonny Man" (Howard Johnson) – 4:05
8. "Appointment in Ghana" (Jackie McLean) – 6:00
9. "'Round Midnight" (Thelonious Monk) – 4:53
10. "And Then Again ... (Kelly Blue - Reprise)" (Kelly Blue) – 0:22

== Personnel ==
- Howard Johnson – tuba, penny whistle
- Dave Bargeron – tuba, euphonium
- Joseph Daley – tuba, euphonium (tracks 1–8)
- Nedra Johnson – tuba (track 5)
- Carl Kleinsteuber – tuba (tracks 2–4, 7–9)
- Earl McIntyre – tuba, euphonium (tracks 1–6, 8)
- Tom Malone – tuba (track 3)
- Marcus Rojas – tuba (tracks 2, 4, 7, 8)
- Bob Stewart – tuba (tracks 1, 4–6)
- Georg Wadenius – guitar (tracks 3, 7)
- Ray Chew – piano (tracks 1, 4, 6)
- Paul Shaffer – piano, keyboards (tracks 3, 5, 7)
- James Williams – piano (tracks 2, 8, 9)
- Bob Cranshaw – double bass (tracks 1, 4–6)
- Melissa Slocum – double bass, electric bass (tracks 2, 3, 7, 8)
- Kenwood Dennard – drums (tracks 1, 4–6)
- Kenny Washington – drums (tracks 2, 3, 7, 8)
- Victor See Yuen – percussion (tracks 3, 7, 8)
