= Fathead (album) =

Fathead, Ray Charles Presents David 'Fathead' Newman

Studio album by David "Fathead" Newman
- Released: 1960
- Recorded: November 5, 1958
- Studio: Atlantic, NYC
- Genre: R&B, jazz
- Length: 37:09
- Label: Atlantic
- Producer: Jerry Wexler, Nesuhi Ertegun

David "Fathead" Newman chronology
Fathead, Ray Charles Presents David 'Fathead' Newman (1960)	The Sound of the Wide Open Spaces!!!! (1960)

Reissue in 2 CD compilation

Professional ratings
Review scores
Source	Rating
AllMusic (link)	4/5 stars
The Penguin Guide to Jazz Recordings	3/4 stars

Fathead (subtitled Ray Charles Presents David 'Fathead' Newman and also referred to as Ray Charles Sextet) is the debut release of American jazz saxophonist David "Fathead" Newman recorded in 1958 but not released until 1960 on the Atlantic label. The complete album was also included with 3 other Newman releases in the 2 CD reissue / compilation, It's Mister Fathead.

== Track listing ==
1. "Hard Times" (Paul Mitchell) – 4:39
2. "Weird Beard" (Hank Crawford) – 4:46
3. "Willow Weep for Me" (Ann Ronell) – 4:56
4. "Bill for Bennie" (Crawford) – 4:14
5. "Sweet Eyes" (Crawford) – 3:43
6. "Fathead" (Newman) – 5:20
7. "Mean to Me" (Fred E. Ahlert, Roy Turk) – 4:13
8. "Tin Tin Deo" (Gil Fuller, Chano Pozo) – 5:18

== Personnel ==
- David "Fathead" Newman – tenor saxophone (tracks 2, 4, 5, 6, 8), alto saxophone (tracks 1, 3, 7)
- Ray Charles – piano
- Marcus Belgrave – trumpet
- Bennie (Hank) Crawford – baritone saxophone
- Edgar Willis – bass
- Milt Turner – drums
