= What'd I Say (album) =

Studio album by Ray Charles
- Released: October 19, 1959
- Recorded: September 11, 1952 – February 18, 1959, New York City
- Genre: Rhythm and blues
- Length: 30:07
- Label: Atlantic
- Producer: Ahmet Ertegün, Jerry Wexler

Ray Charles chronology
Ray Charles at Newport (1958)	What'd I Say (1959)	The Genius of Ray Charles (1959)

Singles from What'd I Say
- 1. "That's Enough" Released: 1959; 2. "What'd I Say" Released: July 1959

What'd I Say is an album by the American musician Ray Charles, released by Atlantic Records in late 1959. His sixth album since the debut Ray Charles in 1957, What'd I Say compiled a range of Charles' material, including his first top 10 hit, the title track "What'd I Say". The album became his first gold record, and is included in Robert Christgau's "Basic Record Library" of 1950s and 1960s recordings, published in Christgau's Record Guide: Rock Albums of the Seventies (1981).

== Overview ==
Though routinely classified as a standard album, at the time of its 1959 release, it was more of a compilation of previously uncollected Charles material. It included recent singles ("That's Enough", "Tell Me How Do You Feel", "What'd I Say", all from 1959; and "My Bonnie", "Rockhouse", "What Kind Of Man Are You", "You Be My Baby", "Tell All The World About You" all issued in 1958), and tracks that had initially been issued as singles as far back as 1952 ("Roll With My Baby") and 1953 ("Jumpin' In The Mornin'").

== Chart performance ==
The album debuted on Billboard magazine's Top LP's chart in the issue dated September 3, 1961, peaking at No. 20 during a seventy-three-week run on the chart.

== Critical reception ==
Professional ratings
Review scores
Source	Rating
AllMusic	3/5 stars

Upon its release, a reviewer for Billboard referred to What'd I Say as "A fine, swinging album," and wrote that Charles "is at his best here."

== Track listing ==
All music is composed by Ray Charles, except where indicated.

Side one
No.	Title	Writer(s)	Length
1.	"What'd I Say"		5:07
2.	"Jumpin' in the Mornin'"		2:43
3.	"You Be My Baby"	Charles, Doc Pomus, Mort Shuman	2:31
4.	"Tell Me How Do You Feel"	Percy Mayfield	2:43
5.	"What Kind of Man Are You" (lead vocal: Mary Ann Fisher)		2:51
Total length:			15:55

Side two
No.	Title	Writer(s)	Length
1.	"Rockhouse"		3:54
2.	"Roll with My Baby"	Sam Sweet	2:37
3.	"Tell All the World About You"		2:05
4.	"My Bonnie"		2:49
5.	"That's Enough"		2:47
Total length:			14:12

=== Notes ===
- On later reissues and some digital platforms, "What'd I Say" is listed as being in two parts: "What'd I Say – Part I" and "What'd I Say – Part II", or "What'd I Say (Pts. 1 and 2)"; "Rockhouse" is similarly listed as "Rockhouse – Part I" and "Rockhouse – Part II", or "Rockhouse (Pts. 1 and 2)".

== Personnel ==
- Ray Charles – piano (all tracks), Wurlitzer electronic piano (track 1), Hammond organ (track 4), vocals (all tracks)
- David Newman – tenor saxophone, alto saxophone (tracks 1, 3, 4, 5, 6, 8, 9, 10)
- Emmett Dennis – baritone saxophone (tracks 3, 5, 6, 8, 9, 10)
- Bennie Crawford – alto saxophone, baritone saxophone (tracks 1, 4)
- Marcus Belgrave – trumpet (tracks 3, 4, 8, 9)
- Lee Harper – trumpet (tracks 3, 8, 9)
- Ricky Harper – trumpet (tracks 5, 10)
- Joe Bridgewater – trumpet (tracks 5, 6, 10)
- John Hunt – trumpet (tracks 4, 6)
- Edgar Willis – double bass (tracks 1, 3, 4, 5, 8, 9, 10)
- Roosevelt Sheffield – double bass (track 6)
- Richie Goldberg – drums (tracks 3, 8, 9)
- William Peeples – drums (tracks 5, 6, 10)
- Teagle Fleming – drums (track 4)
- Milt Turner – drums (track 1)
- Mary Ann Fisher – vocals (tracks 5, 10)
- The Raelettes – backing vocals (tracks 1, 3, 5, 8, 9, 10)
- unknown – trumpet, saxophone, double bass, drums (tracks 2, 7)

Technical

- Marvin Israel – cover design
- Lee Friedlander – cover photography

== Charts ==
Chart (1961)	Peak position
US Billboard Top LP's (150 Best-Selling Monoraul LP's)	20
