= Wendell Harrison =

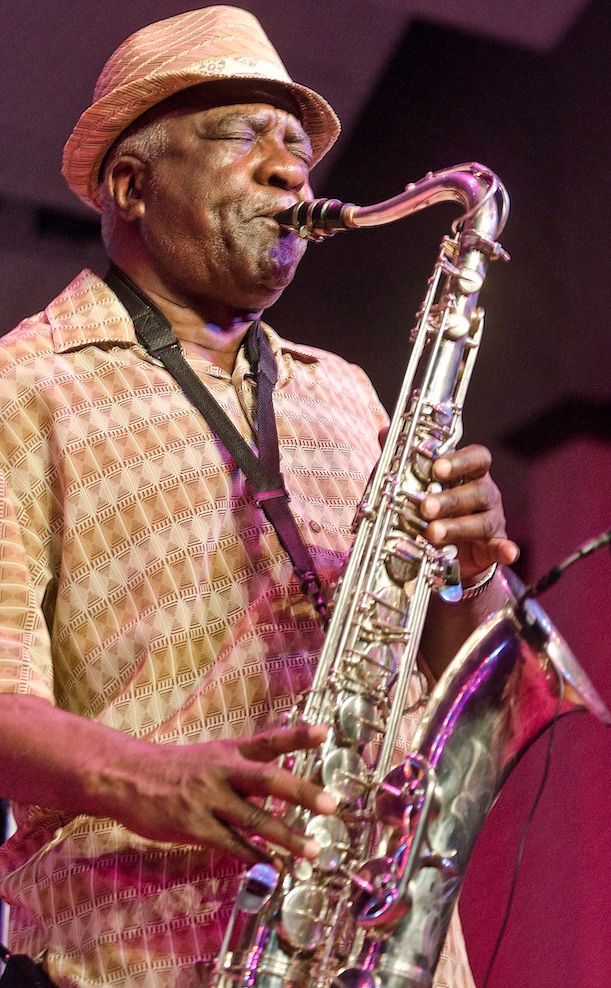

Background information
- Born: October 1, 1942 (age 83); Detroit, Michigan, U.S.
- Genres: Jazz, R&B, avant-garde
- Occupations: Musician, Composer, Producer, Publisher, Educator
- Instruments: Clarinet, Tenor Saxophone
- Years active: 1956–present
- Labels: Tribe, Rebirth, WenHa, Enja

Wendell Harrison (born October 1, 1942) is an American jazz clarinetist and tenor saxophonist.

== Early life and career ==
Wendell Harrison was born in Detroit, Michigan. In Detroit, Harrison began formal jazz studies with pianist Barry Harris. He began playing clarinet at age seven. He switched to tenor saxophone while attending Northwestern High School, and at 14, performed professionally for the first time. In Detroit, early gigs included backing Marvin Gaye as part of Choker Campbell's band. In 1960, Harrison moved to New York. He began performing with artists such as Grant Green, Chuck Jackson, Big Maybelle, and Sun Ra. Along with saxophonist Howard Johnson, and trumpeters Marcus Belgrave and Jimmy Owens, Harrison toured with Hank Crawford and appeared as a sideman on four of Crawford's albums recorded for Atlantic Records during 1965-67.

In the late 1960s, Wendell Harrison relocated to California and entered substance abuse treatment at Synanon center. During his two-year stay, he collaborated with artists such as Esther Phillips and Art Pepper. In addition, Harrison and other residents recorded an album under the musical direction of Greg Dykes. Prince Of Peace was released on Epic Records in 1968.

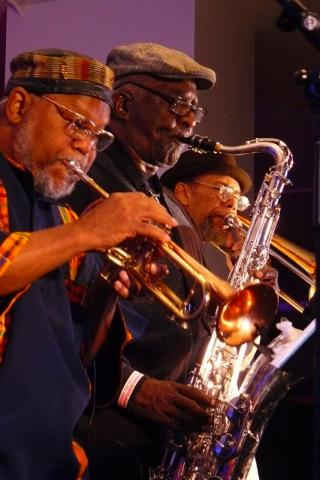
Tribe Reunion

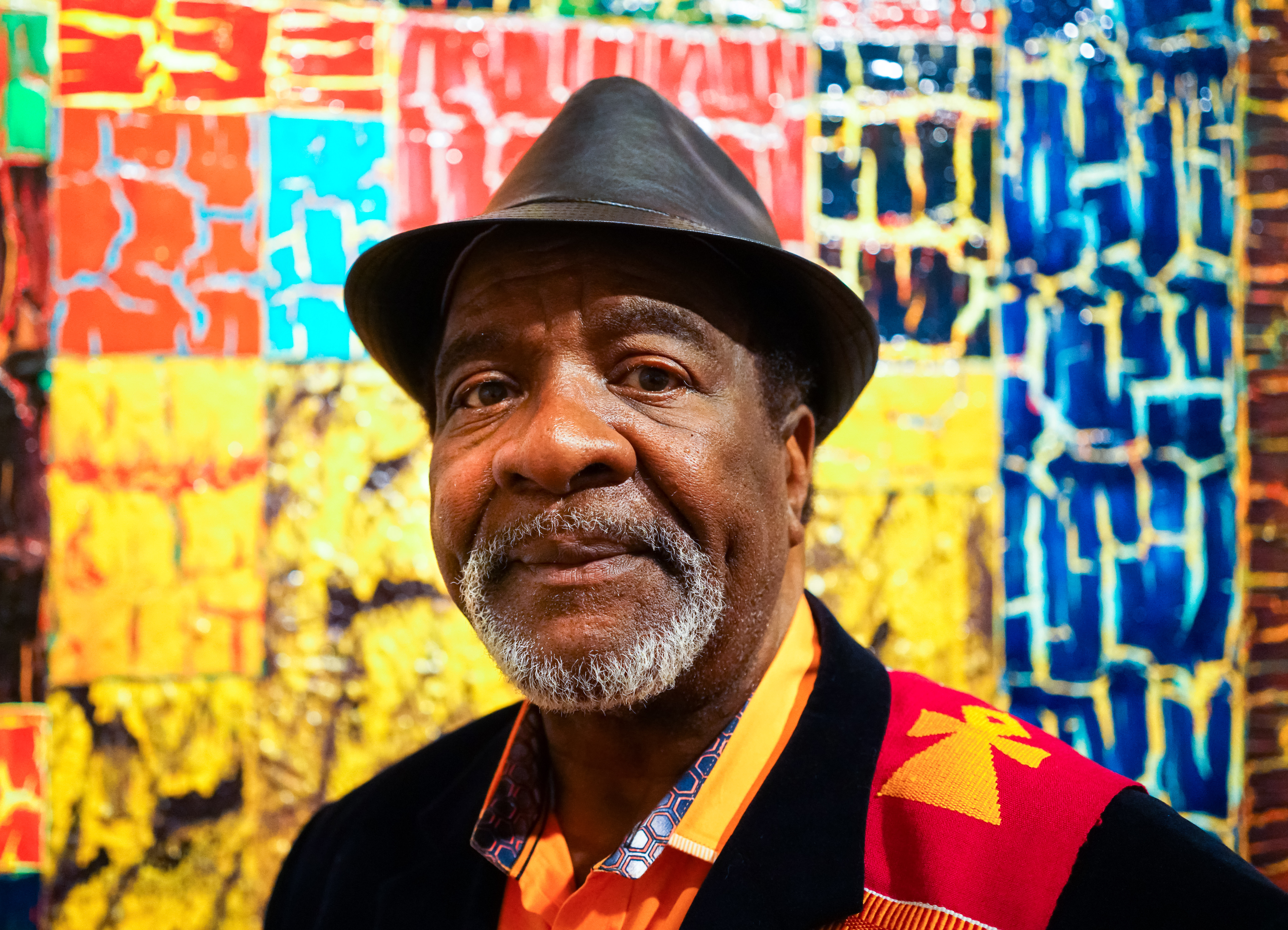

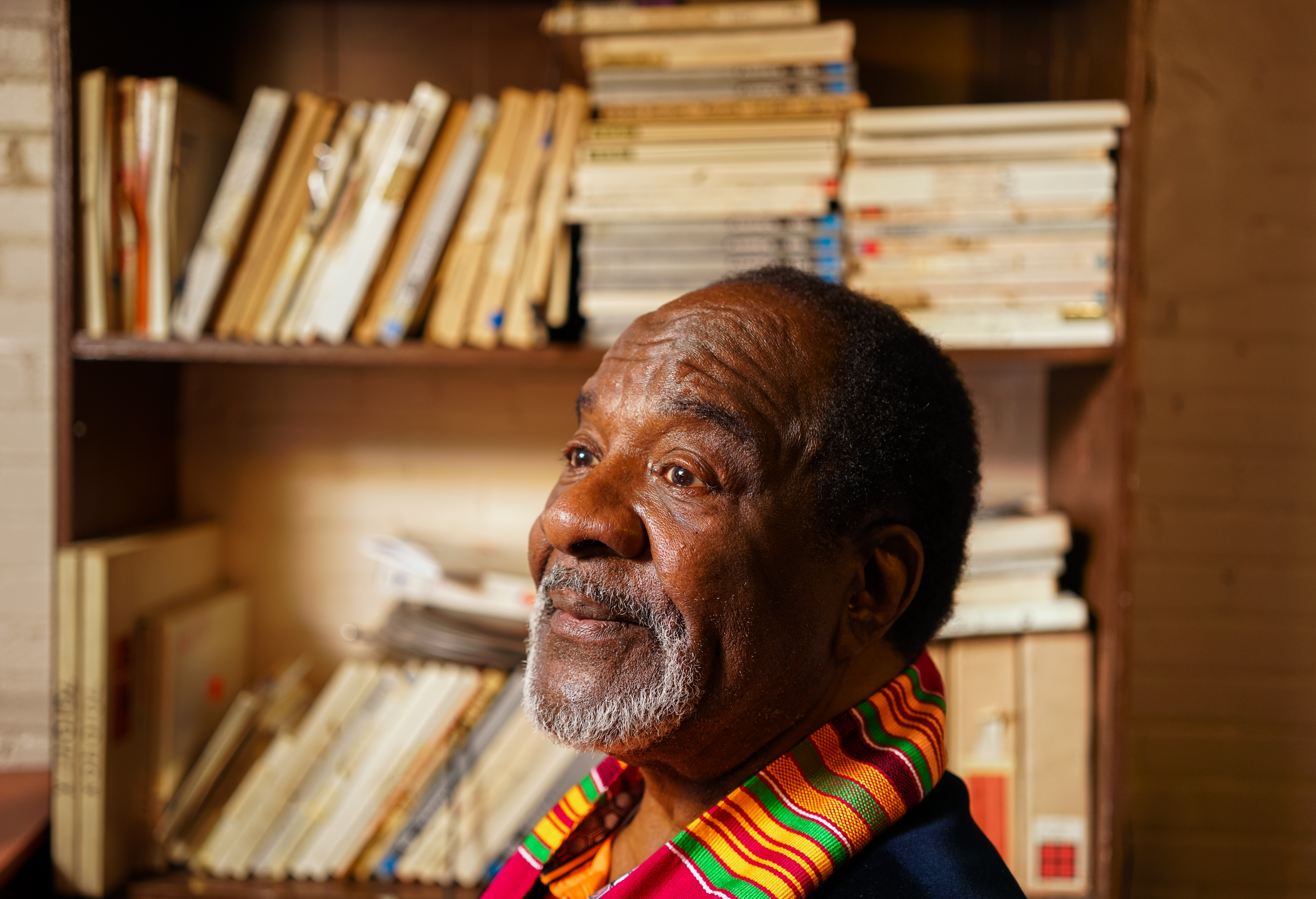

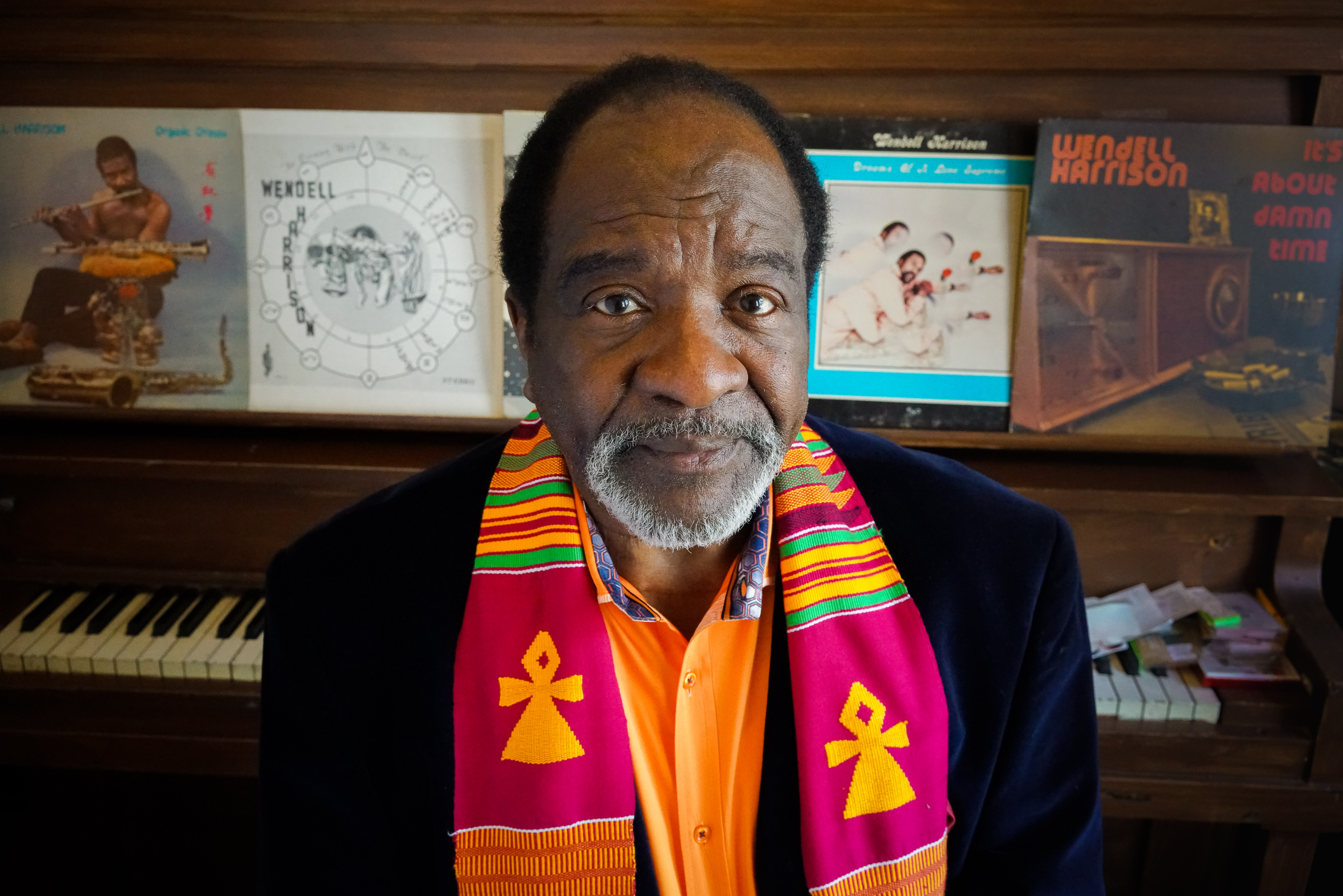

== Tribe ==
In 1971, Harrison headed back to Detroit and began teaching music at Metro Arts, a multi-arts complex for youth. At Metro Arts, Harrison reconnected with Marcus Belgrave, and first met pianist/composer Harold McKinney and trombonist Phil Ranelin, who had moved to Detroit from Indianapolis in 1969. With Ranelin, Harrison formed the Tribe record label and artist collective. Tribe used this vehicle to convey a growing black political consciousness. In addition to McKinney and Belgrave, the group also included drummer and composer Doug Hammond, pianist Kenny Cox, trumpeter Charles Moore, pianist David Durrah, and bassist Ron Brooks.

Harrison and his first wife, Patricia, also published Tribe magazine, a publication dedicated to local and national social and political issues, as well as featuring artistic contributions such as poetry and visual pieces. The magazine proved popular, eventually switching from quarterly to monthly publication. Harrison supervised the editing of Tribe magazine until the final issue hit the newsstands in 1977.

== Rebirth and WenHa ==
In 1978, with encouragement from John Sinclair, Harrison and Harold McKinney co-founded Rebirth, Inc. Run by Harrison's second wife, Pamela Wise, who he met while on a "profound pilgrimage" to Israel, Rebirth is a non-profit jazz performance and education organization, whose mission is to “educate youth and the greater community about jazz through workshop and concert presentations throughout the Midwest”. Notable jazz artists, such as Geri Allen, Jimmy Owens, James Carter, Eddie Harris, Leon Thomas, and Woody Shaw have participated in Rebirth's programs. Further expanding on his focus on music education, Harrison authored the Be Boppers Method Books I & II as a teaching aid to musicians looking to build their improvisational skills.

During this time, Harrison also created the WenHa record label and publishing company, which released many of his recordings as well as that of other artists, such as Wise, Phil Ranelin, and Doug Hammond.

== Return to clarinet ==
In the late 1980s, Harrison increased his focus on the clarinet. He formed the Mama's Licking Stick clarinet ensemble, which features E flat soprano, B flat, alto, bass and contrabass clarinets. With this ensemble, Harrison recorded several albums: Mama's Licking Stick, Rush and Hustle, Live In Concert, and Forever Duke. Harrison has continued to bring attention to the jazz clarinet via education workshops, as well as public performances. He has showcased the clarinet in such varied settings as his own Swing Ensemble (where he occasionally sings) and accompanying techno artist Carl Craig.

== Revisiting Tribe and Michigan Jazz Masters ==
In the early 1990s, Wendell Harrison was awarded the title of “Jazz Master” by Arts Midwest, a regional organization partnered with the National Endowment For the Arts. This distinction led Harrison to collaborate with fellow honorees to form the Michigan Jazz Masters group in 1995. Focusing on a more straight-ahead jazz style for this project, Harrison toured with Michigan Jazz Masters throughout the United States, followed by Middle East and African tours.

Harrison's recordings under the Tribe label continued to have a large following in Europe and Asia. In the early 2000s, this attention led to the reissue of his 1972 release, An Evening With the Devil, as well as most of the Tribe Records catalog. The ensuing publicity encouraged Harrison to once again feature the tenor sax, working closely again, and touring internationally with, Tribe label mates Phil Ranelin and Marcus Belgrave. This renewed interest resulted in another collaboration with producer Carl Craig on the 2009 album, Rebirth, which integrates the style of the 1970s Tribe recordings with Craig's modern production values and musical sensibility. In addition to performing, Harrison is credited with four compositions to the album.

== Recent projects ==
Wendell Harrison continues to hold the position of artistic director of Rebirth[citation], organizing and executing workshops and residencies in school music programs. Harrison also continues to perform and record, collaborating on sessions with artists such as Proof, Amp Fiddler, Don Was, and Will Sessions.

== Education ==
Wendell Harrison earned a Bachelors of Science Degree in 2014 from Spring Arbor University, majoring in Organizational Management. In 2017 he earned a Masters in Communications Degree, also from Spring Arbor University.

== Discography ==
Albums as Leader:

- An Evening with the Devil (Tribe Records, 1972)
- A Message From the Tribe with Phil Ranelin (Tribe, 1973)
- Dreams of a Love Supreme (Rebirth Records, 1979)
- Organic Dream (Rebirth, 1981)
- Birth of a Fossil (Rebirth, 1985)
- Reawakening (Rebirth, 1985)
- Wait Broke the Wagon Down (Rebirth, 1987)
- The Carnivorous Lady (Rebirth, 1988)
- Fly by Night (WenHa, 1990)
- Forever Duke (Wen-Ha, 1991)
- Live in Concert (WenHa, 1992)
- Something For Pops with Harold McKinney (Wenha, 1993)
- Rush & Hustle (WenHa/Enja, 1994)
- The Battle of the Tenors (WenHa/Enja, 1998)
- Eighth House: Riding with Pluto (Entropy Records, 2002)
- Urban Expressions (WenHa, 2004)
- It's About Damn Time (Rebirth, 2011)

Appears on:

- Hank Crawford - Dig These Blues (Atlantic, 1965)
- Hank Crawford - After Hours (Atlantic, 1966)
- Hank Crawford - Mr. Blues (Atlantic, 1967)
- Hank Crawford - Double Cross (Atlantic, 1967)
- Greg Dykes - The Prince Of Peace, 1968
- Phil Ranelin - The Time is Now!, 1973
- Harold McKinney - Voices and Rhythms of the Creative Profile, 1974
- Marcus Belgrave - Gemini II, 1974
- Phil Ranelin - Vibes From the Tribe, 1976
- William Odell Huges - Cruising, 1982
- Michigan Jazz Masters - Urban Griots, 1998
- Telefon Tel Aviv - Map of What Is Effortless, 2004
- Phil Ranelin - Inspiration, 2004
- Slicker - We All Have a Plan, 2004
- Proof - Grown Man Shit, 2005
- Proof - Searching for Jerry Garcia, 2005
- John Arnold - Style and Pattern, 2005
- Amp Fiddler - Afro Strut, 2007
- Carl Craig - Paris Live, 2007
- Tribe - Rebirth, 2009
- Sean Blackman - In Transit, 2009
- Will Sessions - Kindred, 2010
- Doug Hammond Tentet - Rose, 2011
- John Lindberg BC3 - Born in an Urban Ruin, 2016
