= Sonny Stitt with the New Yorkers =

Studio album by Sonny Stitt
- Released: 1957
- Recorded: August 30, 1957
- Studio: Nola's Penthouse Sound, New York City
- Genre: Jazz
- Label: Roost; RLP 2226
- Producer: Teddy Reig

Sonny Stitt chronology
Personal Appearance (1957)	Sonny Stitt with the New Yorkers (1957)	Sonny Side Up (1957)

Professional ratings
Review scores
Source	Rating
Allmusic	3/5 stars

Sonny Stitt with the New Yorkers is an album by the saxophonist Sonny Stitt, recorded in 1957 and originally released on the Roost label.

== Reception ==
The Allmusic site awarded the album 3 stars.

== Track listing ==
All compositions by Sonny Stitt except as indicated

1. "The Best Things in Life Are Free" (Ray Henderson, Lew Brown, Buddy DeSylva) - 5:00
2. "Engos, the Bloos" - 3:40
3. "It Might As Well Be Spring" (Oscar Hammerstein II, Richard Rodgers) - 5:40
4. "Cherokee" (Ray Noble) - 4:05
5. "I Didn't Know What Time It Was" (Lorenz Hart, Rodgers) - 4:30
6. "Body and Soul" (Edward Heyman, Robert Sour, Frank Eyton, Johnny Green) – 3:52
7. "People Will Say We're In Love" (Hammerstein, Rodgers) - 4:50
8. "Bloosey" - 3:45
9. "Birds' Eye" - 4:15

== Personnel ==
- Sonny Stitt - alto saxophone
- Hank Jones - piano
- Wendell Marshall - bass
- Shadow Wilson - drums
