= True Blue (Hank Crawford album) =

Studio album by Hank Crawford
- Released: 1964
- Recorded: June 7 and October 9, 1963 and March 19, 1964; NYC
- Genre: Jazz
- Label: Atlantic; SD 1423
- Producer: Nesuhi Ertegun

Hank Crawford chronology
Soul of the Ballad (1963)	True Blue (1964)	Dig These Blues (1965)

True Blue is the fifth album led by saxophonist Hank Crawford featuring performances recorded in 1963 and 1964 for the Atlantic label.

== Reception ==
Professional ratings
Review scores
Source	Rating
AllMusic	3/5 stars

AllMusic awarded the album 3 stars stating "This lesser-known Hank Crawford set has plenty of enjoyable numbers that fit into the R&Bish soul/jazz idiom."

== Track listing ==
All compositions by Hank Crawford except as indicated

1. "Shake-a-Plenty" - 2:36
2. "Mellow Down" - 3:01
3. "Read 'Em and Weep" - 3:15
4. "Merry Christmas Baby" (Lou Baxter, Johnny Moore) - 3:50
5. "Save Your Love for Me" (Buddy Johnson) - 3:57
6. "Skunky Green" - 2:37
7. "Two Years of Torture" (Percy Mayfield, Charles Morris) - 4:27
8. "Blues in Bloom" (Norman Mapp) - 4:14
9. "Got You on My Mind" (Howard Biggs, Joe Thomas) - 3:12
10. "Shooby" - 4:24

== Personnel ==
- Hank Crawford - alto saxophone
- Julius Brooks (tracks 2, 4 & 8), Phil Guilbeau (tracks 3 & 5–7), John Hunt, Charlie Patterson (tracks 1, 9 & 10) - trumpet
- Wilbur Brown (tracks 1, 2, 4 & 8–10), James Clay (tracks 3 & 5–7) - tenor saxophone
- Leroy Cooper (tracks 2–8), Alexander Nelson (tracks 1, 9 & 10) - baritone saxophone
- Sonny Forriest - guitar (tracks 3 & 5–7)
- Charles Green (tracks 2, 4 & 8), Edgar Willis (tracks 3 & 5–7), Lewis Worrell (tracks 1, 9 & 10) - bass
- Bruno Carr (tracks 3 & 5–7), Carl Lott (tracks 1, 9 & 10), Milt Turner (tracks 2, 4 & 8) - drums
