= After Hours (Hank Crawford album) =

Studio album by Hank Crawford
- Released: 1966
- Recorded: October 17 and November 17, 1965 and January 7 & 19, 1966; NYC
- Genre: Jazz
- Length: 32:46
- Labels: Atlantic; SD 1455
- Producers: Nesuhi Ertegun and Arif Mardin

Hank Crawford chronology
Dig These Blues (1965)	After Hours (1966)	Mr. Blues (1967)

After Hours is the seventh album led by saxophonist Hank Crawford featuring performances recorded in 1964 and 1965 for the Atlantic label.

== Reception ==
Professional ratings
Review scores
Source	Rating
AllMusic	3.5/5 stars

AllMusic awarded the album 3½ stars with reviewer Scott Yanow calling it "A fine soulful crossover set that is quite accessible and melodic."

== Track listing ==
1. "After Hours" (Avery Parrish) - 5:31
2. "Junction" (Benny Golson) - 3:58
3. "Who Can I Turn To (When Nobody Needs Me)" (Leslie Bricusse, Anthony Newley) - 4:41
4. "Next Time You See Me' (Ben Tucker) - 2:53
5. "Soul Shoutin'" (Stanley Turrentine) - 2:50
6. "Makin' Whoopee" (Walter Donaldson, Gus Kahn) - 4:30
7. "When Did You Leave Heaven?" (Richard A. Whiting, Walter Bullock) - 4:22
8. "The Back Slider" (Hank Crawford) - 4:22

== Personnel ==
- Hank Crawford - alto saxophone, piano
- Fielder Floyd, John Hunt - trumpet (tracks 1–5, 7 & 8)
- Wendell Harrison - tenor saxophone (tracks 1–5, 7 & 8)
- Howard Johnson (tracks 1–5 & 8), Alonzo Shaw (track 7) - baritone saxophone
- Sonny Forriest (tracks 2, 3 7 5), Willie Jones (tracks 1, 4 & 8) - guitar
- Charles Dungey (tracks 3 & 5), Charles Green (tracks 6 & 7), Charles Lindsay (track 2), Ali Mohammed (tracks 1, 4 & 8) - bass
- Joe Dukes (tracks 1, 3–5 & 8), Wilbert Hogan (track 2), Milt Turner (tracks 6 & 7) - drums
