= House of David (album) =

Studio album by David Newman
- Released: 1967
- Recorded: March 4, 1967; NYC
- Studio: Atlantic Recording Studios, NYC
- Genre: Jazz
- Length: 38:09
- Label: Atlantic; SD 1489
- Producer: Jack Shaw and Joel Dorn

David "Fathead" Newman chronology
Fathead Comes On (1961)	House of David (1967)	Double Barrelled Soul (1967)

House of David is an album by American saxophonist David Newman featuring performances recorded in 1967 for the Atlantic label.

== Reception ==
Professional ratings
Review scores
Source	Rating
Allmusic	3/5 stars

Allmusic awarded the album 3 stars stating "This album boils with inventive hooks and the soulful combination of organ and guitar that would become more pop-oriented on subsequent Newman recordings".

== Track listing ==
All compositions by David Newman except as indicated

1. "I Wish You Love" (Charles Trenet) - 6:09
2. "One Room Paradise" (J. Leslie McFarland) - 1:37
3. "Little Sister" - 8:16
4. "Miss Minnie" (Claude Johnson) - 2:29
5. "Just Like a Woman" (Bob Dylan) - 4:32
6. "House of David" - 3:48
7. "Blue New" - 3:57
8. "The Holy Land" (Cedar Walton) - 7:21

== Personnel ==
- David Newman - tenor saxophone, flute
- Kossi Gardner - organ
- Ted Dunbar - guitar
- Milt Turner - drums
