= The Young Caucasians =

American pop band

The Young Caucasians were a pop band from the Washington DC area.

The band released a seven-song album, Pop Quiz (Wasp Records, 1983), and six-song EP, The White Stuff (1986). While The Washington Post described their music as "good-humored", it noted that they were not a "joke band".

The Young Caucasians was also the name of a fictional singing group from 1957 that appeared in a single sketch during the fifth episode on November 12, 1977 of Saturday Night Live season 3. In the sketch, the group — composed of cast members Dan Aykroyd, John Belushi, Jane Curtin, Bill Murray, Laraine Newman, and Gilda Radner — performed an interpretation of the Ray Charles song "What'd I Say" (1959) for Charles, who was the episode's host. Charles subsequently performed his own version of the song.
