= Fathead Comes On =

Studio album by Dave Newman
- Released: 1962
- Recorded: May 3 and December 9, 1961; NYC
- Studio: Atlantic Recording Studios, NYC
- Genre: Jazz
- Length: 32:51
- Label: Atlantic; SD 1399
- Producer: Nesuhi Ertegun

Dave Newman chronology
| Straight Ahead (1960) | Fathead Comes On (1962) | House of David (1967) |

Fathead Comes On is an album by American saxophonist Dave Newman featuring performances recorded in 1961 for the Atlantic label.

== Reception ==
Professional ratings
Review scores
| Source | Rating |
|---|---|
| Allmusic | 3/5 stars |

Allmusic awarded the album 3 stars stating "a very bluesy album, but also contains its share of tricky melodies and ambitious arrangements".

== Track listing ==
All compositions by Dave Newman except as indicated

1. "Unchain My Heart" (Teddy Powell, Robert Sharp Jr.) - 4:30
2. "Cellar Groove" (Norris Austin) - 5:39
3. "Alto Sauce" - 5:15
4. "Hello There" - 3:07
5. "Scufflin'" - 6:36
6. "Esther's Melody" - 4:03
7. "Lady Day" (Leroy Johnson) - 3:41
- Recorded in New York City on May 3 (tracks 2, 4 & 7) and December 9 (tracks 1, 3, 5 & 6), 1961

== Personnel ==
- Dave Newman - tenor saxophone, alto saxophone, flute
- Marcus Belgrave - trumpet (tracks 2, 4 & 7)
- Norris Austin (tracks 2, 4 & 7), Hank Crawford (tracks 1, 3, 5 & 6) - piano
- Jimmy Jefferson (tracks 2, 4 & 7), Edgar Willis (tracks 1, 3, 5 & 6) - bass
- Charlie Persip (tracks 2, 4 & 7), Bruno Carr - drums
