= Double Cross (album) =

Studio album by Hank Crawford
- Released: 1968
- Recorded: October 29, 1965 and November 20, 1967; NYC
- Genre: Jazz
- Length: 32:46
- Label: Atlantic; SD 1455
- Producer: Joel Dorn and Arif Mardin

Hank Crawford chronology
Mr. Blues (1967)	Double Cross (1968)	Mr. Blues Plays Lady Soul (1969)

Double Cross is the ninth album led by saxophonist Hank Crawford featuring performances recorded in 1965 and 1967 for the Atlantic label.

== Reception ==
Professional ratings
Review scores
Source	Rating
AllMusic	4.5/5 stars

AllMusic awarded the album 4½ stars.

== Track listing ==
All compositions by Hank Crawford except as indicated

1. "Double Cross" - 3:19
2. "Jimmy Mack" (Eddie Holland, Lamont Dozier, Brian Holland) - 2:36
3. "Glue Fingers" - 3:27
4. "I Can't Stand It" - 4:45
5. "In the Heat of the Night" (Alan and Marilyn Bergman, Quincy Jones) - 4:03
6. "The Second Time Around" (Jimmy Van Heusen, Sammy Cahn) - 3:52
7. "Mud Island Blues" - 5:56
8. "Someday (You'll Want Me to Want You)" (Jimmie Hodges) - 3:50

== Personnel ==
- Hank Crawford - alto saxophone, piano
- Fielder Floyd (tracks 7 & 8), John Hunt (tracks 7 & 8), Melvin Lastie (tracks 1–6), Joe Newman (tracks 1–6) - trumpet
- Tony Studd - trombone (tracks 1–6)
- Wendell Harrison (tracks 7 & 8), David Newman (tracks 1–6) - tenor saxophone
- Pepper Adams (tracks 1–6), Alonzo Shaw (track 7 & 8) - baritone saxophone
- Carl Lynch - guitar (tracks 1–6)
- Jack McDuff - piano (track 5)
- Charles Green - bass (tracks 7 & 8)
- Jimmy Tyrell - electric bass (tracks 1–6)
- Bruno Carr (tracks 1–6), Wilbert Hogan (tracks 7 & 8) - drums
- Stanislaw Zagórski, album design
