= Kenny Dennis =

American jazz musician (born 1930)

Kenny Dennis (born May 27, 1930) is a Philadelphia-born American jazz drummer. He has played on albums for Nancy Wilson, Sonny Stitt, Sonny Rollins, Johnny Griffin, Oscar Brown Jr., Charles Mingus, Billy Taylor, and Mal Waldron.

== Biography ==
Dennis began his musical career in the United States Army Band, playing drums in three bands from 1948 to 1952. After being discharged, he connected with junior high school mate, pianist Ray Bryant and became part of The Ray Bryant Trio along with Jimmy Rowser on bass. They became the house trio at the North Philadelphia Jazz Club, Blue Note where they played for such jazz artists as Kai Winding, Chris Connor and Sonny Stitt. His career next took him to New York, where he worked with artists including Miles Davis, Phineas Newborn, Jr., Billy Taylor, Erroll Garner, Charles Mingus and Sonny Rollins. He was in a short-lived trio started by Bill Evans, with Jimmy Garrison on bass, in the late 1950s.

In 1957, Dennis performed in Sonny Rollins's Trio with bassist Wendell Marshall at Carnegie Hall—a historic performance that was commemorated in 2007 with a 50th-anniversary concert. Dennis moved to California, when Miles Davis recommended him to Lena Horne. Recording credits include recordings with such artists as Michel Legrand, Miles Davis, Charlie Mingus, Nancy Wilson, Gerald Wilson and poet Langston Hughes.

Since 1997, Dennis has been an assistant director of the Lab Band at the award-winning Los Angeles County High School for the Arts. He and his wife Nancy Wilson were married from 1960 to 1970. Their son, Kacy (né Kenneth Dennis, Jr.) was born in 1963.

== Discography ==
=== As sideman ===
- Roy Ayers, West Coast Vibes (United Artists, 1963)
- Burt Bacharach, Blue Note Plays Burt Bacharach (Blue Note, 2004 )
- Miles Davis, Facets (CBS, 1967)
- Dodo Greene, Ain't What You Do (Time, 1959)
- Johnny Griffin, The Congregation (Blue Note, 1957)
- Slide Hampton, Slide Hampton and His Horn of Plenty (Strand, 1961)
- Slide Hampton, Two Sides of Slide (Fresh Sound, 1994)
- Langston Hughes, The Weary Blues with Langston Hughes (MGM, 1958)
- Michel Legrand, Legrand Jazz (Columbia, 1958)
- Michel Legrand, Michel Legrand Meets Miles Davis (Philips, 1970)
- Sonny Rollins, Plays (Period, 1956)
- Sonny Stitt, 37 Minutes and 48 Seconds with Sonny Stitt (Roost, 1957)
- Sonny Stitt, Personal Appearance (Verve, 1959)
- Sonny Stitt, Symphony Hall Swing (Savoy, 1986)
- Billy Taylor, One for Fun (Atlantic, 1959)
- Mal Waldron, Mal/4: Trio (New Jazz, 1958)
- Nancy Wilson, Guess Who I Saw Today (Capitol, 2005)
