= From the Heart (Hank Crawford album) =

Studio album by Hank Crawford
- Released: 1962
- Recorded: November 8, 1961, April 13 and May 16, 1962
- Genre: Jazz
- Length: 38:58
- Label: Atlantic; SD 1387
- Producer: Nesuhi Ertegun

Hank Crawford chronology
The Soul Clinic (1961)	From the Heart (1962)	Soul of the Ballad (1963)

From the Heart is the third album by saxophonist Hank Crawford, featuring performances recorded in 1961 and 1962 for the Atlantic label.

== Reception ==
Professional ratings
Review scores
Source	Rating
AllMusic	4/5 stars

AllMusic awarded the album four stars, stating "From the Heart features Crawford digging deep into the Memphis tradition for expression. ...This is an early highpoint for Crawford."

== Track listing ==
All compositions by Hank Crawford except as indicated

1. "Don't Cry Baby" (Saul Bernie, James P. Johnson, Stella Unger) - 4:22
2. "Sweet Cakes" - 3:40
3. "You've Changed" (Bill Carey, Carl Fischer) - 3:20
4. "Baby Let Me Hold Your Hand" (Ray Charles) - 3:53
5. "Sherri" - 4:39
6. "The Peeper" - 3:09
7. "But on the Other Hand" (Percy Mayfield) - 5:03
8. "Stoney Lonesome" - 5:43
9. "What Will I Tell My Heart?" (Irving Gordon, Jack Lawrence, Peter Tinturin) - 5:09

== Personnel ==
- Hank Crawford - alto saxophone, piano
- Phil Guilbeau, John Hunt - trumpet
- David Newman - tenor saxophone
- Leroy Cooper - baritone saxophone
- Sonny Forriest - guitar (tracks 1, 3, 5 & 6)
- Edgar Willis - bass
- Bruno Carr - drums
