= Leroy Cooper (musician) =

- Born: August 31, 1928
- Origin: Dallas, Texas, US
- Died: January 15, 2009 (aged 80)
- Genres: Jazz, R&B
- Occupation(s): Musician, bandleader
- Instrument: Baritone saxophone
- Years active: 1950s–2000

Leroy "Hog" Cooper (August 31, 1928 – January 15, 2009) was an American jazz and R&B baritone saxophonist, most known for his 20-year association, some of the time as musical director/bandleader, with Ray Charles.

From 1948 to 1951, Cooper toured with Ernie Fields' territory band.

A childhood friend of David "Fathead" Newman, in 1954 the two played together in the sax section backing Lowell Fulson on his first single for Chess Records, "Reconsider Baby".

In 1957, Newman recommended Cooper to Charles, who joined Charles' band the same summer as bassist Edgar Willis, both musicians staying on with Charles for some 20 years.

Cooper also played, recorded or toured with Lightnin' Hopkins, Clarence "Gatemouth" Brown, Lowell Fulson, The Righteous Brothers, Dr. John, Del Shannon, Bobby Short, and Joe Cocker. He performed locally in Orlando until the time of his death, with the Smokin' Torpedoes & Josh Miller Blues Band.

== Discography ==
=== As sideman ===
with Ray Charles

with Hank Crawford

- 1960: More Soul (Atlantic)
- 1961: The Soul Clinic (Atlantic)
- 1962: From the Heart (Atlantic)
- 1964: True Blue (Atlantic)
- 1965: Dig These Blues (Atlantic)

With Curtis Amy

- Mustang (Verve, 1967)

various

- 1954: "Reconsider Baby" – Lowell Fulson (Chess)
- 1975: Hollywood Be Thy Name – Dr. John
- 1978: Luxury You Can Afford – Joe Cocker
- 1988: Big News from Baton Rouge!! – Kenny Neal
- 1990: Return to the Wide Open Spaces – David Newman
- 1990: Noble & Nat – Noble "Thin Man" Watts and Nat Adderley
- 1991: Walking on Fire – Kenny Neal
