= Dig These Blues =

Studio album by Hank Crawford
- Released: 1966
- Recorded: April 13 and December 10, 1964 and February 11, 1965; NYC
- Genre: Jazz
- Length: 35:32
- Label: Atlantic; SD 1436
- Producer: Nesuhi Ertegun and Arif Mardin

Hank Crawford chronology
True Blue (1964)	Dig These Blues (1966)	After Hours (1966)

Dig These Blues is the sixth album led by saxophonist Hank Crawford featuring performances recorded in 1964 and 1965 for the Atlantic label.

== Reception ==
Professional ratings
Review scores
Source	Rating
AllMusic	3.5/5 stars

AllMusic awarded the album 3½ stars.

== Track listing ==
All compositions by Hank Crawford except as indicated

1. "Dig These Blues" - 4:34
2. "Don't Get Around Much Anymore" (Duke Ellington, Bob Russell) - 5:04
3. "Banana Head" - 3:00
4. "H.C. Blues" - 2:50
5. "These Tears" - 2:37
6. "Hollywood Blues" - 3:20
7. "Baby Won't You Please Come Home" (Charles Warfield. Clarence Williams) - 5:48
8. "New Blues" (Phineas Newborn, Jr.) - 4:25
9. "Bluff City Blues" - 3:54

== Personnel ==
- Hank Crawford - alto saxophone, piano
- Oliver Beener (tracks 1, 3 & 5), Marcus Belgrave (tracks 2, 7 & 9), Julius Brooks (tracks 4, 6 & 8), Phil Guilbeau (tracks 1, 3 & 5), John Hunt (tracks 4, 6 & 8), Jimmy Owens (tracks 2, 7 & 9) - trumpet
- Abdul Baari (tracks 2, 7 & 9), Wilbur Brown (tracks 4, 6 & 8), Wendell Harrison (tracks 1, 3 & 5) - tenor saxophone
- Leroy Cooper (tracks 1, 3-6 & 8), Howard Johnson (tracks 2, 7 & 9) - baritone saxophone
- Charles Green (tracks 2, 7 & 9), Ali Mohammed (tracks 1, 3 & 5), Edgar Willis (tracks 4, 6 & 8) - bass
- Bruno Carr (tracks 1, 3-6 & 8), Milt Turner (tracks 2, 7 & 9) - drums
