= The Soul Clinic =

Studio album by Hank Crawford
- Released: 1962
- Recorded: October 7, 1960, February 24 and May 2, 1961; NYC
- Genre: Jazz
- Length: 34:54
- Label: Atlantic; SD 1372
- Producer: Nesuhi Ertegun

Hank Crawford chronology
More Soul (1961)	The Soul Clinic (1962)	From the Heart (1962)

The Soul Clinic is the second album led by saxophonist Hank Crawford featuring performances recorded in 1961 (with one track from 1960) for the Atlantic label.

== Reception ==
Professional ratings
Review scores
Source	Rating
AllMusic	3/5 stars

AllMusic awarded the album 3 stars.

== Track listing ==
All compositions by Hank Crawford except as indicated

1. "Please Send Me Someone to Love" (Percy Mayfield) - 3:31
2. "Easy Living" (Ralph Rainger, Leo Robin) - 5:28
3. "Playmates" - 4:22
4. "What a Diff'rence a Day Made" (María Grever, Stanley Adams) - 5:31
5. "Me and My Baby" (Horace Silver) - 4:22
6. "Lorelei's Lament" - 5:37
7. "Blue Stone" - 6:03

== Personnel ==
- Hank Crawford - alto saxophone, piano
- Phillip Guilbeau - trumpet (trumpet solo on "What A Difference A Day Makes")
- John Hunt - trumpet
- David Newman - tenor saxophone
- Leroy Cooper - baritone saxophone
- Edgar Willis - bass
- Bruno Carr - drums
- Milt Turner - drums (on "What A Difference A Day Makes" only)
