= Soul of the Ballad =

Studio album by Hank Crawford & the Marty Paich Orchestra
- Released: 1963
- Recorded: February 16 & 20, 1963; Los Angeles, CA
- Genre: Jazz
- Length: 36:57
- Label: Atlantic; SD 1405
- Producer: Nesuhi Ertegun

Hank Crawford chronology
| From the Heart (1962) | Soul of the Ballad (1963) | True Blue (1964) |

Soul of the Ballad is an album by saxophonist Hank Crawford featuring performances backed by the Marty Paich Orchestra recorded in 1963 for the Atlantic label.

== Reception ==
Professional ratings
Review scores
| Source | Rating |
|---|---|
| AllMusic | 2/5 stars |

AllMusic awarded the album 2 stars stating "the sound reproduction is flawless. Unfortunately the quality of the music itself is not high at all. The repertoire includes more than its share of losers... the arrangements are quite dull and Crawford does little more than caress the melodies. Definitely a lesser effort."

== Track listing ==
1. "Blueberry Hill" (Vincent Rose, Larry Stock, Al Lewis) – 3:23
2. "I Left My Heart in San Francisco" (George Cory, Douglass Cross) – 2:43
3. "Stormy Weather" (Harold Arlen, Ted Koehler) – 3:17
4. "Sweet Slumber" (Lucky Millinder, Henri Woode, Al J. Neiburg) – 2:55
5. "If I Didn't Care" (Jack Lawrence) – 2:46
6. "Stardust" (Hoagy Carmichael, Mitchell Parish) – 3:57
7. "Any Time" (Herbert "Happy" Lawson) – 2:43
8. "Whispering Grass" (Fred Fisher, Doris Fisher) – 2:46
9. "Time out for Tears" (Irving Berman, Abe Schiff) – 2:58
10. "I'm Gettin' Sentimental Over You" (George Bassman, Ned Washington) – 3:20
11. "There Goes My Heart" (Benny Davis, Abner Silver) – 3:15
12. "Have a Good Time" (Boudleaux Bryant, Felice Bryant) – 2:54

== Personnel ==
- Hank Crawford – alto saxophone, tenor saxophone
- Unidentified Orchestra arranged and conducted by Marty Paich
