= Mustang (Curtis Amy album) =

Studio album by Curtis Amy
- Released: 1967
- Recorded: January 26, 1967
- Studio: Bell Sound (New York City)
- Genre: Jazz
- Label: Verve V/V6 8684
- Producer: Jack Shaw, Joel Dorn

Curtis Amy chronology
The Sounds of Broadway / The Sounds of Hollywood (1965)	Mustang (1967)	Peace for Love (1994)

Professional ratings
Review scores
Source	Rating
AllMusic	3/5 stars

Mustang is an album by American jazz saxophonist Curtis Amy featuring performances recorded in 1967 and released on the Verve label.

== Track listing ==
All compositions by Curtis Amy, except as indicated.

1. "Mustang" (Sonny Red) – 3:20
2. "Shaker Heights" – 11:56
3. "Enojo" – 3:37
4. "Mustang" (Red) – 5:14
5. "Please Send Me Someone to Love" (Percy Mayfield) – 3:26
6. "Old Devil Moon" (Burton Lane, Yip Harburg) – 6:04

== Personnel ==
- Curtis Amy – soprano saxophone, tenor saxophone
- Leroy Cooper – baritone saxophone
- Jimmy Owens – trumpet, flugelhorn
- Carl Lynch – guitar
- Kenny Barron – piano
- Edgar Willis – bass
- Bruno Carr – drums
- Eva Harris – vocals (track 5)
