= Mr. Blues =

Studio album by Hank Crawford
- Released: 1967
- Recorded: October 17 & 29, 1965, November 17, 1965, January 14 & 19, 1966 and March 21, 1966; NYC
- Genre: Jazz
- Length: 33:03
- Label: Atlantic; SD 1470
- Producer: Nesuhi Ertegun and Arif Mardin

Hank Crawford chronology
After Hours (1966)	Mr. Blues (1967)	Double Cross (1968)

Mr. Blues is the sixth album led by saxophonist Hank Crawford featuring performances recorded in 1965 and 1966 for the Atlantic label.

== Reception ==
Professional ratings
Review scores
Source	Rating
AllMusic	3/5 stars

AllMusic awarded the album 3 stars.

== Track listing ==
All compositions by Hank Crawford except as indicated

1. "Mr. Blues" - 3:59
2. "On a Clear Day (You Can See Forever)" (Burton Lane, Alan Jay Lerner) - 3:09
3. "Hush Puppies" - 3:07
4. "Danger Zone" (Percy Mayfield) - 3:27
5. "Route 66" (Bobby Troup) - 3:28
6. "Lonely Avenue" (Doc Pomus) - 4:10
7. "Teardrops" (Sylvester Thompson, Seaphus Scott) - 3:32
8. "Smoky City" - 3:39
9. "The Turfer" - 3:33

== Personnel ==
- Hank Crawford - alto saxophone, piano
- Fielder Floyd, John Hunt - trumpet
- Wendell Harrison - tenor saxophone
- Howard Johnson (tracks 4, 6 & 9), Lonnie Shaw (tracks 1–3, 5, 7 & 8) - baritone saxophone
- Sonny Forriest - guitar (tracks 1, 2, 4, 6 & 9)
- Charles Dungey (track 4), Charles Green (tracks 1–3, 5, 7 & 8), Charles Lindsay (tracks 6 & 9) - bass
- Joe Dukes (track 4), Wilbert Hogan (tracks 3, 6 & 9), Milt Turner (tracks 5, 7 & 8), Isaac Walton (tracks 1 & 2) - drums
- Recorded in NYC on October 17, 1965 (track 8), October 29, 1965 (track 3), November 17, 1965 (tracks 5 & 7), January 14, 1966 (track 6 & 9), January 19, 1966 (track 4) and March 21, 1966 (tracks 1 & 2)
