= Personal Appearance (album) =

Studio album by Sonny Stitt
- Released: 1957
- Recorded: May 12, 1957
- Genre: Jazz
- Length: 75:03
- Label: Verve
- Producer: Norman Granz

Sonny Stitt chronology
37 Minutes and 48 Seconds with Sonny Stitt (1957)	Personal Appearance (1957)	Sonny Stitt with the New Yorkers (1957)

Professional ratings
Review scores
Source	Rating
Allmusic	4/5 stars
DownBeat	5/5 stars
The Penguin Guide to Jazz Recordings	3/4 stars

Personal Appearance is a 1957 album by Sonny Stitt.

== Reception ==
The original Downbeat review by Ira Gitler awarded the album 5 stars. He wrote "In rating this album five stars, I do not mean to say it is a 'perfect' record. Timmons plays well, but this is Stitt's album, and he is tremendous. Sonny is all over both his horns, communicating directly and deeply. If you consider yourself a jazz lover, you should own this set."

== Track listing ==
1. "You'd Be So Easy to Love" (Cole Porter) – 4:45
2. "Easy Living" (Ralph Rainger, Leo Robin) – 4:49
3. "Autumn in New York" (Vernon Duke) – 2:20
4. "You'd Be So Nice to Come Home To" (Porter) – 4:52
5. "For Some Friends" (Sonny Stitt) – 4:44
6. "I Never Knew" (Ted Fio Rito, Gus Kahn) – 4:27
7. "Between the Devil and the Deep Blue Sea" (Harold Arlen, Ted Koehler) – 5:14
8. "East of the Sun (and West of the Moon)" (Brooks Bowman) – 5:30
9. "Original?" (Stitt) – 4:33
10. "Avalon" (Buddy DeSylva, Al Jolson, Vincent Rose) – 2:55
11. "Blues Greasy" (Stitt) – 3:20

== Personnel ==
=== Performance ===
- Sonny Stitt - alto saxophone, tenor saxophone
- Bobby Timmons – piano
- Edgar Willis – bass
- Kenny Dennis - drums
