= Milt Turner =

American jazz drummer (1930–1993)

Milton Turner (1930–1993) was a jazz drummer.

After graduating from Pearl High School, he attended Tennessee State University, where he coincided with Hank Crawford, who he later recommended to join him in Ray Charles' band when he took over from William Peeples in the late 1950s.

In 1962, he was a member of Phineas Newborn's trio with Leroy Vinnegar, on whose solo albums he would later appear, and in the early 1960s, Turner also recorded with Teddy Edwards. He never recorded as a leader.

== Discography ==
With Ray Charles

- What'd I Say (Atlantic, 1959)
- The Genius Hits the Road (ABC-Paramount, 1960)

With Hank Crawford

- More Soul (Atlantic, 1960)
- The Soul Clinic (Atlantic, 1962)
- True Blue (Atlantic, 1964)
- Dig These Blues (Atlantic, 1966)
- After Hours (Atlantic, 1966)
- Mr. Blues (Atlantic, 1967)

With Teddy Edwards

- Good Gravy! (Contemporary, 1961)
- Heart & Soul (Contemporary, 1962)

With Joe Gordon

- Lookin' Good! (Contempoarary, 1961)

With Paul Horn

- The Sound of Paul Horn (Columbia, 1961)
- Profile of a Jazz Musician (Columbia, 1962)

With Charles Kynard

- Where It's At! (Pacific Jazz, 1963)

With Phineas Newborn, Jr.

- The Great Jazz Piano of Phineas Newborn Jr. (Contemporary, 1963)

With David "Fathead" Newman

- Fathead (Atlantic, 1960)
- House of David (Atlantic, 1967)

With Helyne Stewart

- Love Moods (Contemporary, 1961)

With Sarah Vaughan

- Sarah Sings Soulfully (Roulette, 1963)

With Leroy Vinnegar

- Leroy Walks Again!! (Contemporary, 1963)
- Jazz's Great "Walker" (VeeJay, 1964)

With Jimmy Woods

- Awakening!! (Contemporary, 1962)
