= Sonny Forriest =

Elbert McKinley "Sonny" Forriest (May 21, 1934 – January 10, 1999) was an American guitar player. He is best known for playing guitar for The Coasters.

== Biography ==
Forriest was born in Pendleton, North Carolina in 1934. During the Korean War, Forriest served in the United States Air Force. From 1959 through 1961, he played guitar with The Coasters on such recordings as "Bésame Mucho," "Wake Me, Shake Me," "Shoppin' For Clothes," "Thumbin' A Ride," "Girls Girls Girls," "Ridin' Hood," and "Lady Like." He joined the Ray Charles Orchestra in 1962.

Forriest recorded four songs for Verve Records. On September 30, 1963, he recorded "In Trouble" (unreleased) and "Now That I'm Lonely." On October 1, 1963, he recorded "I'm Travelin'" and "Wedding Day" (unreleased). He released a solo jazz album called Tuff Pickin': The Blue Guitar Of Sonny Forriest And His Orchestra on Decca Records in 1965. He has also done studio work for other artists including Ray Charles and Hank Crawford.

Forriest died on January 10, 1999, in Capitol Heights, Maryland.

His son, Sonny Forriest Jr., is a musician who has played with Harold Melvin & The Blue Notes, The Philly Intruders, and The Hearts Of Stone.

== Discography ==
=== Solo singles ===
- "Madame Booty Grenn" / "Mama Keep My Wife at Home" (recorded in November 1959), Red Top Records 128
- "Diddy Bop" / "Knockdown" (November 1959), Atco Records 6157 (as "Sonny Forrest")
- "Sonny's Groove" / "Madame Booty Green" (November 1959), Atco Records 6157 (unissued)
- "In Trouble" (September 1963), Verve Records (unissued)
- "Now that I'm Lonely" / "I'm Traveling" (September/October 1963), Verve Records
- "Wedding Day" (October 1963), Verve Records (unissued)
- "Don't Mess With My Woman" / "Train" (May 1964, possibly), Escort Records 106
- "Lil' Sister" / "It's Very Clear" (May 1964, possibly), Escort Records (unissued)
- "I Got A Woman" / "Tuff Pickin'" (1965), Decca 31888

=== Solo albums ===
- Tuff Pickin': The Blue Guitar Of Sonny Forriest & His Orchestra (1965), Decca DL-4716

=== As sideman ===
With The Coasters

- One By One (Atco, 1960)

With Hank Crawford

- From the Heart (Atlantic Records, 1962)
- True Blue (Atlantic, 1964)
- After Hours (Atlantic, 1966)
- Mr. Blues (Atlantic, 1967)

== Bibliography ==
- Blues Records, Mike Leadbitter & Neil Slaven, Record Information Services, 1987 - ISBN 978-0907872078
