= 37 Minutes and 48 Seconds with Sonny Stitt =

Studio album by Sonny Stitt
- Released: 1957
- Studio: Capitol Studios, New York City
- Genre: Jazz
- Length: 37:48
- Label: Roost
- Producer: Teddy Reig

Sonny Stitt chronology
For Musicians Only (1956)	37 Minutes and 48 Seconds with Sonny Stitt (1957)	Personal Appearance (1957)

Professional ratings
Review scores
Source	Rating
Allmusic	3/5 stars

37 Minutes and 48 Seconds with Sonny Stitt is an album by saxophonist Sonny Stitt that was released by Roost.

== Track listing ==
All tracks are written by Sonny Stitt, except as indicated.

No.	Title	Writer(s)	Length
1.	"Because of You"	Arthur Hammerstein, Dudley Wilkinson	4:53
2.	"Blue Moon"	Lorenz Hart, Richard Rodgers	4:15
3.	"Windy Ride"		5:10
4.	"But Not for Me"	George Gershwin, Ira Gershwin	4:10
5.	"What Is This Thing Called Love?"	Cole Porter	4:10
6.	"Harlem Nocturne"	Earle Hagen, Dick Rogers	3:42
7.	"Sweet Georgia Brown"	Ben Bernie, Maceo Pinkard, Kenneth Casey	3:40
8.	"Blues For Yard"		3:38
9.	"Scrapple from the Apple"	Charlie Parker	4:10

== Personnel ==
- Sonny Stitt – alto saxophone
- Dolo Coker – piano
- Edgar Willis – bass
- Kenny Dennis – drums
