= Howard Johnson (jazz musician) =

American musician (1941–2021)

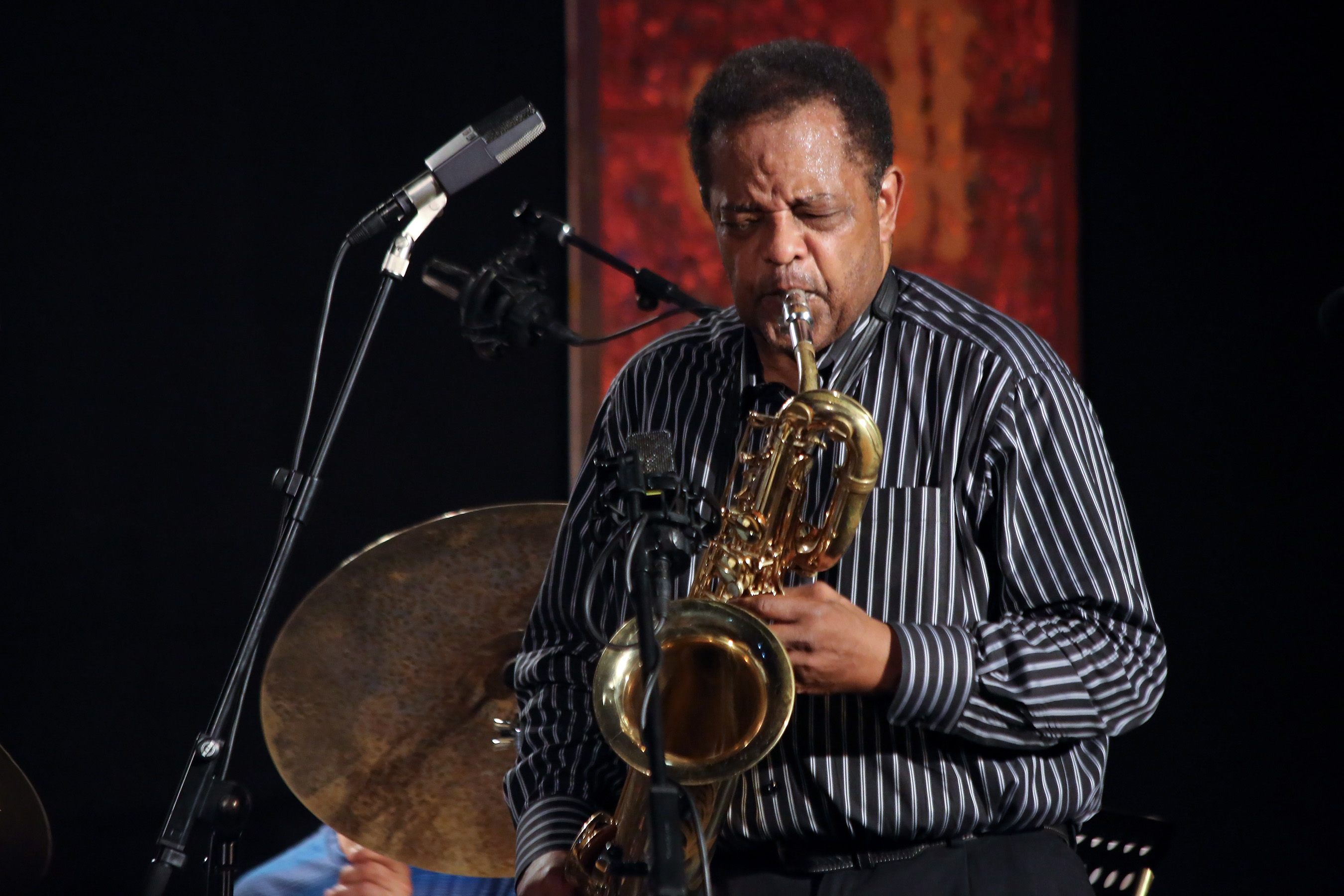
- Johnson in 2013

Background information
- Born: Howard Lewis Johnson; August 7, 1941; Montgomery, Alabama, U.S.
- Died: January 11, 2021 (aged 79) New York City, U.S.
- Genre: Jazz
- Occupation: Musician
- Instruments: Tuba, baritone saxophone

Howard Lewis Johnson (August 7, 1941 – January 11, 2021) was an American jazz musician, known mainly for his work on tuba and baritone saxophone, although he also played the bass clarinet, trumpet, and other reed instruments. He is known to have expanded the tuba’s known capacities in jazz.

Johnson was known for his extensive work as a sideman, notably with George Gruntz, Hank Crawford, and Gil Evans. As a leader, he fronted the tuba ensemble Gravity and released three albums during the 1990s for Verve Records; the first Arrival, was a tribute to Pharoah Sanders.

== Biography ==
Howard Lewis Johnson was born on August 7, 1941 in Montgomery, Alabama, United States, but from the age of two was raised in Massillon, Ohio. A self-taught musician, he began playing baritone saxophone and tuba while still in high school. After graduating in 1958, he served in the U.S. Navy before moving to Boston, where he lived with the family of the drummer Tony Williams. He then spent time in Chicago, where he met Eric Dolphy, before moving to New York City in 1963.

In the 1960s he worked with Charles Mingus, Hank Crawford, Rahsaan Roland Kirk, Archie Shepp, and Hank Mobley on the album A Slice of the Top. He also began a long association with Gil Evans in 1966. He was arranger of a horn section that backed Taj Mahal on Mahal's 1971 live album, The Real Thing, which featured three other tubists/multi-instrumentalists, Bob Stewart, Joseph Daley and Earl McIntyre. Johnson also played with the Band on their Rock of Ages live album, The Last Waltz and into the new millennium with Levon Helm's band.

During the 1970s, he was the live band conductor of the Saturday Night Live Band; he can be seen in several musical numbers, including playing bass saxophone in the "King Tut" sketch and leading his all-tuba band Gravity in a featured performance on Season 3, Episode 17. Gravity was perhaps his best-known band.

Johnson led three tuba bands, collaborated with Tomasz Stańko, Substructure, Tuba Libre, and Gravity. He has recorded frequently. In 1981, he performed at the Woodstock Jazz Festival, held in celebration of the tenth anniversary of the Creative Music Studio. He had a minor role in the 1983 film Eddie and the Cruisers as Wendell's replacement. He has also appeared in episodes of Matlock and Hill Street Blues. In 1984, he appeared as part of the Gil Evans Orchestra, accompanying Jaco Pastorius at the Live Under the Sky festival in Japan.

Johnson played saxophone on The Muddy Waters Woodstock Album (1975) with Levon Helm, Garth Hudson, Paul Butterfield, Bob Margolin and Pinetop Perkins.

Johnson accompanied James Taylor on tuba in a performance of "Jelly Man Kelly" on Sesame Street in 1983, and also on tin whistle when Taylor sings "Your Grouchy Face" to Oscar the Grouch.

== Personal life and death ==
Johnson was father to David and Nedra. David (1964–2009) was an actor in New York, and lived in Brooklyn. Nedra is a blues singer and musician. Johnson died on January 11, 2021, "in his New York home".

== Discography ==
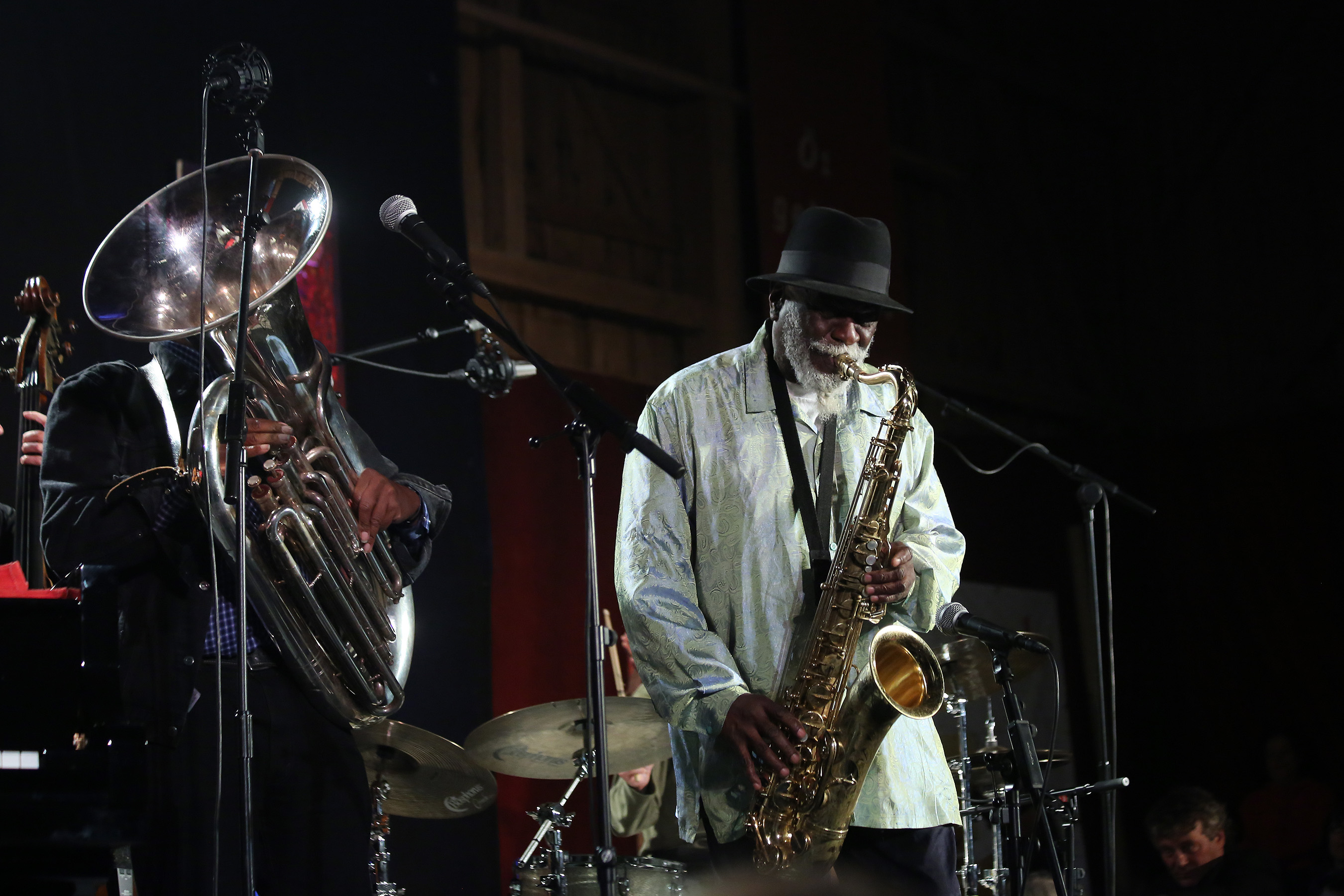
Howard Johnson with Pharoah Sanders (2013)

=== As leader ===
- Arrival: A Pharoah Sanders Tribute (Verve, 1994)
- Gravity!!! (Verve, 1996)
- Right Now! (Verve, 1997)
- Testimony (Tuscarora, 2017)

=== As sideman ===
- Hank Crawford: Dig These Blues (Atlantic, 1965), After Hours (Atlantic, 1966), Mr. Blues (Atlantic, 1967), Night Beat (Milestone, 1989), Groove Master (Milestone, 1990), Tight (Milestone, 1996)
- Charles Mingus: Music Written for Monterey 1965 (Jazz Workshop, 1965), Charles Mingus and Friends in Concert (Columbia, 1972), Let My Children Hear Music (Columbia, 1972)
- Archie Shepp: Mama Too Tight (Impulse!, 1966)
- Gary Burton: A Genuine Tong Funeral (RCA, 1967–68)
- Gábor Szabó & Bob Thiele: Light My Fire (Impulse!, 1967)
- Gerald Wilson: Live and Swinging (Pacific Jazz, 1967)
- Charlie Haden: Liberation Music Orchestra (Impulse, 1968)
- Jazz Composers Orchestra: The Jazz Composer's Orchestra (JCOA, 1968)
- Gil Evans: Blues in Orbit (Enja, 1969–71), Svengali (ACT, 1973), The Gil Evans Orchestra Plays the Music of Jimi Hendrix (RCA, 1974), There Comes a Time (RCA, 1975), Live at Sweet Basil (Gramavision, 1984), Live at Sweet Basil Vol. 2 (Gramavision, 1984)
- Andrew Hill: Passing Ships (Blue Note, 1969)
- Pharoah Sanders: Izipho Zam (My Gifts) (Strata-East, 1969 [1973])
- Leon Thomas: The Leon Thomas Album (Flying Dutchman, 1970)
- Johnny Coles: Katumbo (Dance) (Mainstream, 1971)
- Taj Mahal: The Real Thing (Columbia, 1971)
- Charles Tolliver: Music Inc. (Strata-East, 1971)
- The Band: Rock of Ages (Capitol, 1972)
- Carla Bley: Tropic Appetites (Watt, 1973–74), Escalator over the Hill
- John Lennon, Walls and Bridges (Apple, 1974)
- Sam Rivers: Crystals (Impulse! 1974)
- Gato Barbieri: Chapter Three: Viva Emiliano Zapata (Impulse!, 1974), Chapter Four: Alive in New York (Impulse!, 1975)
- Jaco Pastorius: Jaco Pastorius (Sony, 1975), Word of Mouth (Warner Bros., 1981)
- Muddy Waters: The Muddy Waters Woodstock Album (Chess, 1975)
- Dexter Gordon: Sophisticated Giant (Columbia, 1977)
- Levon Helm & the RCO All-Stars: Levon Helm & the RCO All-Stars (ABC, 1977)
- The Band, The Last Waltz (Capitol, 1978)
- Clifford Jordan: Inward Fire (Muse, 1978)
- John Lennon and Yoko Ono, Double Fantasy (Capitol, 1980)
- David "Fathead" Newman: Still Hard Times (Muse, 1982)
- James Taylor: "Jellyman Kelly", "Your Grouchy Face" (Sesame Street, 1983)
- Jack De Johnette Special Edition: Album Album (ECM, 1984)
- Jimmy Heath: New Picture (Landmark, 1985)
- Franco Ambrosetti: Tentets (Enja, 1985)
- Miles Davis: Miles & Quincy Live at Montreux (Warner Bros., 1991)
- NDR Big Band: Bravissimo (ACT, 1992)
- Ray Anderson: Big Band Record (Gramavision, 1994) with the George Gruntz Concert Jazz Band
- The Band, High on the Hog (Rhino, 1996)
- Barbara Dennerlein: Junkanoo (Verve, 1996)
- John Scofield: Quiet (Verve, 1996)
- T. S. Monk: Monk on Monk (N2K, 1997)
- Chet Baker: But Not for Me (Random Chance, 2003)
- David "Fathead" Newman: Cityscape (HighNote, 2006)
- Charles Tolliver: With Love (Blue Note, 2006)

With George Gruntz Concert Jazz Band

- The George Gruntz Concert Jazz Band with Guest Star Elvin Jones (MPS, 1978)
- At Zürich Schauspielhaus (Kenwood, 1981)
- Live 82 (Amiga, 1982)
- Theatre (ECM, 1983)
- Happening Now! (Hat Hut, 1987)
- First Prize (Enja, 1989)
- Beyond Another Wall (TCB, 1991)
- Blues 'n' Dues et Cetera (Enja, 1991)
- Ray Anderson & The George Gruntz Big Band (Gramavision, 1994)

With Mario Pavone

- Deez to Blues (Playscape, 2006)
