= What'd I Say =

1959 single by Ray Charles

Single by Ray Charles

from the album What'd I Say
- B-side: "What'd I Say, Pt. 2"
- Released: June 1959
- Recorded: February 18, 1959
- Genre: Rhythm and blues; soul; rock and roll
- Length: 5:10 (Monaural album); 3:05 (Part 1); 1:59 (Part 2); 6:27 (Stereo album)
- Label: Atlantic
- Songwriter: Ray Charles
- Producer: Jerry Wexler

Ray Charles singles chronology
"Night Time Is the Right Time" (1959)	"What'd I Say" (1959)	"I'm Moving On" (1959)

"What'd I Say"

Single by Jerry Lee Lewis

from the album Jerry Lee's Greatest!
- B-side: "Livin' Lovin' Wreck"
- Released: February 1961
- Recorded: 1961
- Studio: Phillips Recording Service, Nashville, Tennessee
- Label: Sun
- Songwriter: Ray Charles

Jerry Lee Lewis singles chronology
"When I Get Paid" (1960)	"What'd I Say" (1961)	"Cold, Cold Heart" (1961)

"What'd I Say"

Single by Bobby Darin

from the album Bobby Darin Sings Ray Charles
- Released: March 1962
- Recorded: 1961
- Length: 2:15 (Part 1); 1:43 (Part 2)
- Label: Atco
- Songwriter: Ray Charles
- Producer: Jimmie Haskell

Bobby Darin singles chronology
"Multiplication" (1961)	"What'd I Say" (1962)	"Things" (1962)

"What'd I Say" (or "What I Say") is an American rhythm and blues song by Ray Charles, released in June 1959. As a single divided into two parts, it was one of the first soul songs. The composition was improvised one evening late in 1958 when Charles, his orchestra, and backup singers had played their entire set list at a show and still had time left; the response from many audiences was so enthusiastic that Charles announced to his producer that he was going to record it.

After his run of R&B hits, this song finally broke Charles into mainstream pop music and itself sparked a new sub-genre of R&B titled soul, finally putting together all the elements that Charles had been creating since he recorded "I Got a Woman" in 1954. The gospel and rhumba influences combined with the sexual innuendo in the song made it not only widely popular but very controversial to both white and black audiences. It earned Ray Charles his first gold record and has been one of the most influential songs in R&B and rock and roll history. For the rest of his career, Charles closed every concert with the song. It was added to the National Recording Registry in 2002 and appeared in the 2003 and 2021 versions of Rolling Stone's "The 500 Greatest Songs of All Time" list: at number 10 in 2003 and at number 80 in 2021.

== Background ==
Ray Charles was 28 years old in 1958, with 10 years of experience recording primarily rhythm and blues music in a style similar to that of Nat King Cole and Charles Brown. He signed with Atlantic Records in 1952 where producers Ahmet Ertegun and Jerry Wexler encouraged him to broaden his repertoire. Wexler would later remember that Atlantic Records' success came not from the artists' experience, but the enthusiasm for the music: "We didn't know shit about making records, but we were having fun". Ertegun and Wexler found that a hands-off approach was the best way of encouraging Charles. Wexler later said, "I realized the best thing I could do with Ray was leave him alone".

During Charles' heyday in the 1950s and 1960s, he toured for 300 days a year with a seven-piece orchestra. He employed another Atlantic singing trio named the Cookies and renamed them the Raelettes when they backed him up on the road. In 1954, Charles began merging gospel sounds and instruments with lyrics that addressed more secular issues. His first attempt was in the song "I Got a Woman", based either on the melodies from the gospel songs, The Southern Tones "It Must Be Jesus" or an uptempo, "I Got a Savior (Way Across Jordan)". It was Charles' first record that received attention from white audiences, but made some black audiences uncomfortable with its black gospel derivatives; Charles later stated that the joining of gospel and R&B was not a conscious decision.

In December 1958, he had a hit on the R&B charts with "Night Time Is the Right Time", an ode to carnality that was sung between Charles and one of the Raelettes, Margie Hendricks, with whom Charles was having an affair. Since 1956, Charles had also included a Wurlitzer electric piano on tour because he did not trust the tuning and quality of the pianos provided to him at every venue. On the occasions he would play it, he was derided by other musicians.

== Composition and recording ==
Opening of "What'd I Say"
The left-handed riffs of "What'd I Say" performed by Ray Charles on the Wurlitzer electric piano.

According to Charles' autobiography, "What'd I Say" was accidental when he improvised it to fill time at the end of a concert in December 1958. He asserted that he never tested songs on audiences before recording them, but "What'd I Say" was an exception. Charles himself did not recall where the concert took place, but Mike Evans in Ray Charles: The Birth of Soul placed the show in Brownsville, Pennsylvania. Shows were played at "meal dances" which typically ran four hours with a half-hour break, and would end around 1 or 2 in the morning. Charles and his orchestra had exhausted their set list after midnight, but had 12 minutes left to fill. He told the Raelettes, "Listen, I'm going to fool around and y'all just follow me".

Starting on the electric piano, Charles played what felt right: a series of riffs, switching then to a regular piano for four choruses backed up by a unique Latin conga tumbao rhythm on drums. The song changed when Charles began singing simple, improvised unconnected verses ("Hey Mama don't you treat me wrong / Come and love your daddy all night long / All right now / Hey hey / All right"). Charles used gospel elements in a twelve-bar blues structure. Some of the first lines ("See the gal with the red dress on / She can do the Birdland all night long") are influenced by a boogie-woogie style that Ahmet Ertegun attributes to Clarence "Pinetop" Smith, who used to call out to dancers on the dance floor, telling them what to do through his lyrics. In the middle of the song, however, Charles indicated that the Raelettes should repeat what he was doing, and the song transformed into a call and response between Charles, the Raelettes, and the horn section in the orchestra as they called out to each other in ecstatic shouts and moans and blasts from the horns.

The audience reacted immediately; Charles could feel the room shaking and bouncing as the crowd was dancing. Many audience members approached Charles at the end of the show to ask where they could purchase the record. Charles and the orchestra performed it again several nights in a row with the same reaction at each show. He called Jerry Wexler to say he had something new to record, later writing, "I don't believe in giving myself advance notices, but I figured this song merited it".

The Atlantic Records studio had just purchased an 8-track recorder, and recording engineer Tom Dowd was familiarizing himself with how it worked. On February 18, 1959, Charles and his orchestra finally recorded "What'd I Say" at Atlantic's small studio. Dowd recalled that it did not seem special at the time of recording. It was second of two songs during the session and Charles, the producers, and the band were more impressed with the first one at the session, "Tell the Truth": "We made it like we made all the others. Ray, the gals, and the band live in the small studio, no overdubs. Three or four takes, and it was done. Next!" In retrospect, Ahmet Ertegun's brother Nesuhi credits the extraordinary sound of the song to the restricted size of the studio and the technologically advanced recording equipment used; the sound quality is clear enough to hear Charles slapping his leg in time with the song when the music stops during the calls and responses. The song was recorded in only a few takes because Charles and the orchestra had perfected it while touring.

Dowd, however, had two problems during the recording. "What'd I Say" lasted over seven and a half minutes when the normal length of radio-played songs was around two and a half minutes. Furthermore, although the lyrics were not obscene, the sounds Charles and the Raelettes made in their calls and responses during the song worried Dowd and the producers. A previous recording called "Money Honey" by Clyde McPhatter had been banned in Georgia and Ahmet Ertegun and Wexler released McPhatter's song despite the ban, risking arrest. Ray Charles was aware of the controversy in "What'd I Say": "I'm not one to interpret my own songs, but if you can't figure out 'What I Say', then something's wrong. Either that, or you're not accustomed to the sweet sounds of love."

Dowd solved the recording issues by mixing three versions of the song. Some call-outs of "Shake that thing!" were removed, and the song was split into two three-and-a-half minute sides of a single record, titling the song "What'd I Say Part I" and "What'd I Say Part II". The recorded version divides the parts with a false ending where the orchestra stops and the Raelettes and orchestra members beg Charles to continue, then goes on to a frenzied finale. Dowd later stated after hearing the final recording that not releasing the record was never an option: "we knew it was going to be a hit record, no question." It was held for the summer and released in June 1959.

== Personnel ==
The following musicians played on the session for "What'd I Say".

- Ray Charles – piano, Wurlitzer electronic piano, lead vocals
- David Newman – tenor saxophone, alto saxophone
- Bennie Crawford – alto saxophone, baritone saxophone
- Edgar Willis – double bass
- Milt Turner – drums
- The Raelettes – backing vocals

== Reception ==
"What'd I Say" Part II sample
The call and responses between Charles, the Raelettes, and the orchestra that caused it to be banned from radio stations, but also propelled it to much wider audiences.

Billboard magazine initially gave "What'd I Say" a tepid review: "He shouts out in percussive style ... Side two is the same." The secretary at Atlantic Records started getting calls from distributors, however. Radio stations refused to play it because it was too sexually charged, but Atlantic refused to take the records back from stores. A slightly sanitized version was released in July 1959 in response to the complaints, and the song hit number 82. A week later it was at 43, then 26. In contrast to their earlier review, Billboard several weeks later wrote that the song was "the strongest pop record that the artist has done to date". Within weeks "What'd I Say" topped out at number one on Billboard's R&B singles chart, number six on the Billboard Hot 100. "What'd I Say" was Ray Charles' first gold record. It also became Atlantic Records' best-selling song at the time.

"What'd I Say" was banned by many black and white radio stations because of, as one critic noted, "the dialogue between himself and his backing singers that started in church and ended up in the bedroom". The erotic nature was obvious to listeners, but a deeper aspect of the fusion between black gospel music and R&B troubled many black audiences. Music, as was much of American society, was also segregated, and some critics complained that gospel was not only being appropriated by secular musicians, but it was being marketed to white listeners. During several concerts in the 1960s, the crowds became so frenetic and the shows so resembled revival meetings while Charles performed "What'd I Say" that the police were called in, when the organizers became worried that riots might break out. The moral controversy surrounding the song has been attributed to its popularity; Charles later acknowledged in an interview that the beat was catchy, but it was the suggestive lyrics that attracted listeners: " 'See the girl with the diamond ring. She knows how to shake that thing.' It wasn't the diamond ring that got 'em."

"What'd I Say" was Ray Charles' first crossover hit into the growing genre of rock and roll. He seized the opportunity of his immense newfound success and announced to Ertegun and Wexler that he was considering signing with ABC-Paramount Records (later renamed ABC Records) later in 1959. While he was in negotiations with ABC-Paramount, Atlantic Records released an album of his hits, titled What'd I Say.

== Legacy ==
In an instant, the music called Soul comes into being. Hallelujah!

— Lenny Kaye

Michael Lydon, another of Charles' biographers, summarized the impact of the song: "'What'd I Say' was a monster with footprints bigger than its numbers. Daringly different, wildly sexy, and fabulously danceable, the record riveted listeners. When 'What'd I Say' came on the radio, some turned it off in disgust, but millions turned the volume up to blasting and sang 'Unnnh, unnnh, oooooh, oooooh' along with Ray and the Raelets. [It] became the life of a million parties, the spark of as many romances, and a song to date the Summer by."

The song was also influential in the United Kingdom. Paul McCartney was immediately struck by the song and knew when he heard it that he wanted to be involved in making music. George Harrison remembered an all-night party he attended in 1959 where the song was played for eight hours non-stop: "It was one of the best records I ever heard." While the Beatles were developing their sound in Hamburg, they played "What'd I Say" at every show, trying to see how long they could make the song last and using the audience in the call and response, with which they found immense popularity. The opening electric piano in the song was the first John Lennon had ever heard, and he tried to replicate it with his guitar. Lennon later credited Charles' opening of "What'd I Say" to the birth of songs dominated by guitar riffs.

When Mick Jagger sang for the first time with the band that would become the Rolling Stones, he performed a duet of "What'd I Say". Eric Burdon from the Animals, Steve Winwood of the Spencer Davis Group, Brian Wilson of the Beach Boys, and Van Morrison counted the song as a major influence on why they became interested in music and incorporated it into their shows. Music historian Robert Stephens attributes the birth of soul music to "What'd I Say" when gospel and blues were successfully joined; the new genre of music was matured by later musicians such as James Brown and Aretha Franklin. "In an instant, the music called Soul comes into being. Hallelujah!" wrote musician Lenny Kaye in a retrospective of Atlantic Records artists.

In the late 1950s, rock and roll was faltering as its major stars dropped from public view. Elvis Presley was drafted, and Buddy Holly and Eddie Cochran died in 1959 and 1960 respectively. Music and culture critic Nelson George disagrees with music historians who attest the last two years of the 1950s were barren of talent, pointing to Charles and this song in particular. George writes that the themes in Charles' work were very similar to the young rebels who popularized rock and roll, writing

By breaking down the division between pulpit and bandstand, recharging blues concerns with transcendental fervor, unashamedly linking the spiritual and the sexual, Charles made pleasure (physical satisfaction) and joy (divine enlightenment) seem the same thing. By doing so he brought the realities of the Saturday-night sinner and Sunday-morning worshipper—so often one and the same—into raucous harmony.

"What'd I Say" has been covered by many artists in many different styles. Jerry Lee Lewis found particular success with his rendition in 1961, which peaked at number 30 and spent eight weeks on the charts. The following year, Bobby Darin's version reached #21 in Canada. Elvis Presley used the song in a large dance scene in his 1964 film Viva Las Vegas and released it on the B-side of the title song. Cliff Richard, Eric Clapton with John Mayall & the Bluesbreakers, Rare Earth, Eddie Cochran, Nancy Sinatra, and Sammy Davis Jr., all put their own style on the song. Charles noticed, later writing "I saw that many of the stations which had banned the tune started playing it when it was covered by white artists. That seemed strange to me, as though white sex was cleaner than black sex. But once they began playing the white version, they lifted the ban and also played the original."

Charles spoofed this double standard on the television comedy show Saturday Night Live in 1977. He hosted an episode and had the original band he toured with in the 1950s to join him. In one skit, he tells a producer that he wants to record the song, but the producer tells him that a white band named the 'Young Caucasians', composed of beaming white teenagers, are to record it first, which they do on the show, in a chaste, sanitized, and unexciting performance. When Charles and his band counter with their original version, Garrett Morris tells them, "Sorry. That'll never make it."

Charles closed every show he played for the rest of his career with the song, later stating, "'What'd I Say' is my last song onstage. When I do 'What'd I Say', you don't have to worry about it—that's the end of me; there ain't no encore, no nothin'. I'm finished!"

It was ranked tenth on Rolling Stone's list of "The 500 Greatest Songs of All Time", with the summary, "Charles' grunt-'n'-groan exchanges with the Raeletts were the closest you could get to the sound of orgasm on Top Forty radio during the Eisenhower era". In 2000, it ranked number 43 on VH1's 100 Greatest Songs in Rock and Roll and number 96 on VH1's 100 Greatest Dance Songs, being the oldest song in the latter ranking. The same year it was chosen by National Public Radio as one of the 100 most influential songs of the 20th century. The song was inducted into the Grammy Hall of Fame also in 2000. Bruce Conner's 1962 collage film Cosmic Ray uses a live recording of "What'd I Say" as its soundtrack. A central scene in the 2004 biopic Ray features the improvisation of the song performed by Jamie Foxx, who won an Academy Award for his portrayal of Charles. For its historical, artistic, and cultural significance, the Library of Congress added it to the U.S. National Recording Registry in 2002. The Rock & Roll Hall of Fame featured it as one of 500 Songs that Shaped Rock and Roll in 2007.

== Bibliography ==
- Charles, Ray and Ritz, David (1978). Brother Ray: Ray Charles' Own Story, The Dial Press. ISBN 0-8037-0828-9
- Creswell, Toby (2006). 1001 Songs: The Greatest Songs of All Time and the Artists, Stories, and Secrets Behind Them, Thunder's Mouth Press. ISBN 1-56025-915-9
- Crow, Thomas (2023). The Artist in the Counterculture. Princeton University Press. ISBN 978-0-691-23616-2.
- Ertegun, Ahmet (ed., 2001). "What'd I Say?": The Atlantic Story: 50 Years of Music, Welcome Rain Publishers. ISBN 1-56649-048-0
- Evans, Mike (2007). Ray Charles: The Birth of Soul, Omnibus Press. ISBN 978-1-84449-764-5
- George, Nelson (1988). The Death of Rhythm & Blues. Pantheon Books. ISBN 0-394-55238-5
- Larson, Thomas (2004). The History of Rock and Roll, Kendall/Hunt Publishing Company. ISBN 0-7872-9969-3
- Lydon, Michael (1998). Ray Charles: Man and Music, Riverhead Books. ISBN 1-57322-132-5
- Schinder, Scott; Schwartz, Andy (2007). Icons of Rock: An Encyclopedia of the Legends Who Changed Music Forever. Bloomsbury Publishing USA. ISBN 978-0-313-08190-3.
