= Night Time Is the Right Time =

Song recorded by Nappy Brown in 1957 & popularized by Ray Charles

"The Right Time"

Single by Nappy Brown
- Released: November 1957
- Recorded: New York City, 1957
- Genre: Rhythm and blues
- Length: 3:02
- Label: Savoy
- Songwriter: N. Brown (record label credit)

"Night Time Is the Right Time" or "The Right Time" is a rhythm and blues song recorded by American musician Nappy Brown in 1957. It draws on earlier blues songs and has inspired popular versions, including those by Ray Charles, Rufus and Carla, and James Brown, which reached the record charts. Creedence Clearwater Revival recorded a version of the song on their 1969 album, Green River, and The Animals included a version of the song on their debut album, The Animals, released in 1964.

== Earlier songs ==
Blues pianist Roosevelt Sykes (listed as "the Honey Dripper") recorded "Night Time Is the Right Time" in 1937. Called "one of his 'hits' of the day", it is a moderate-tempo twelve-bar blues that features Sykes on vocal and piano. It has been suggested that it was "drawn from the old vaudeville tradition":

Now I want you to tell me, mama after I sing this song
Can I take you with me tonight darlin', and hold you in my arms
Because night time is the right time, to be with the one you love, with the one you love

In 1938, Big Bill Broonzy recorded the song, as "Night Time Is the Right Time No. 2", with slightly different (and more suggestive) lyrics. The same year, Roosevelt Sykes recorded a new version, similarly entitled "Night Time Is the Right Time #2", also with slightly different lyrics. These earliest recordings of "Night Time Is the Right Time" are credited to Roosevelt Sykes and Leroy Carr. Carr died in 1935 without any known recordings of the song; "Night Time Is The Right Time" bears similarity to Carr's "When the Sun Goes Down".

== Nappy Brown song ==
In 1957, Nappy Brown recorded the song as "The Right Time". Called "a highlight of Brown's early career", his version features additional lyrics with background singers answering his vocal lines. The instrumental accompaniment is provided by Buster Cooper on trombone, Hilton Jefferson on alto sax, Budd Johnson on tenor sax, Kelly Owens on piano, Skeeter Best on guitar, Leonard Gaskin on bass, and Bobby Donaldson on drums. Brown's song opens with

You know the night time (ba-do-day), is the right time (ba-do-day)
To be (ba-do-day), with the one you love (ba-do-day)

Brown's version did not reach the national record charts, but was "borrowed by Ray Charles in short order". During his career, Brown recorded several versions of the song (sometimes varying the title). His original single lists the songwriter as "N. Brown".

== Ray Charles version ==
Ray Charles recorded his version, titled "(Night Time Is) The Right Time", on October 28, 1958, at the Atlantic Records studio in New York City. According to Brown, "The difference between me and Ray Charles's ‘Night Time Is the Right Time' ... is he had it up-tempo with Mary Ann and them behind him—the ladies. I had mine in a slow tempo with a gospel group behind me. That was my gospel group. But he got everything just like mine, note for note". Margie Hendrix with Charles' backup singers the Raelettes provided the accompaniment to Charles' vocals.

Released as a single, it reached number five on the Billboard R&B chart and number 95 on its Hot 100 chart in 1959. The songwriters were listed as "Brown-Cadena-Herman" on the single and the albums Ray Charles in Person (1960) and The Genius Sings the Blues (1961); however, some later anthologies only list Lew Herman, also known as Herman Lubinsky, who was the owner of Nappy Brown's record label. The song is also included on Ray Charles at Newport (1958) and the film soundtrack of Ray (2004).

In the second season episode of The Cosby Show titled "Happy Anniversary", the Huxtable family lip-syncs to Ray Charles' version. CNN's Lisa Respers France stated "No 'Cosby Show' list is complete without this family performance... Keshia Knight Pulliam stole our hearts as little Rudy Huxtable in this scene." while Vulture called it The Cosby Show's best musical moment. In 1997, TV Guide ranked this episode number 54 on its '100 Greatest Episodes of All Time' list.

== James Brown version ==
James Brown recorded the song for the small Churchill/Augusta record label. It was released in 1983 as the B-side of his single "Bring It On...Bring It On". Brown's version (subtitled "To be With the One That You Love") went on to reach number 73 in the Billboard R&B chart. Robert Christgau reviewed Brown's version favorably, singling out for praise the contribution of its unidentified female guest vocalist, "a Brownette who approaches any kind of note as if she owns it."

== Other notable cover versions ==
- The British Invasion band The Animals recorded the song for their eponymous debut album released in 1964.
- The American garage rock band The Sonics recorded the song for their 1965 debut album Here Are the Sonics.
- The American swamp rock band Creedence Clearwater Revival recorded the song for their 1969 studio album Green River.
