= Hit the Road Jack =

1961 single by Ray Charles

Single by Ray Charles
- B-side: "The Danger Zone"
- Released: August 1961
- Recorded: June 1961
- Genre: R&B
- Length: 2:00
- Label: ABC-Paramount
- Songwriter: Percy Mayfield
- Producer: Sid Feller

Ray Charles singles chronology
"One Mint Julep" (1961)	"Hit the Road Jack" (1961)	"I Can’t Stop Loving You" (1962)

"Hit the Road Jack" is a song written by the rhythm and blues singer Percy Mayfield and recorded by Ray Charles. The song was a US number 1 hit in 1961, and won a Grammy Award for Best Rhythm and Blues Recording, becoming one of Charles' signature songs.

== Background ==
The song was written by Percy Mayfield, who first recorded it in 1960 as an a cappella demo sent to music executive Art Rupe. It became famous after it was recorded by the singer-songwriter-pianist Ray Charles with vocalist Margie Hendrix of The Raelettes.

Charles’s recording hit number one for two weeks on the Billboard Hot 100, beginning on Monday, October 9, 1961. "Hit the Road Jack" won a Grammy Award for Best Rhythm and Blues Recording. The song was number one on the R&B Sides chart for five weeks, thereby becoming Charles’s sixth number-one on that chart. The song was ranked number 387 on Rolling Stone magazine's 2010 list of "The 500 Greatest Songs of All Time"; it had ranked at number 377 on the original 2004 list.

In 2013, the 1961 recording by Ray Charles on the ABC-Paramount label was inducted into the Grammy Hall of Fame.

The Chantels released an answer song, "Well, I Told You" which charted at No. 29.

In June 2026, CBS News included the song in its list of the 250 essential American songs of the past 250 years.

== Charts and certifications ==
=== Charts ===
Chart (1961)	Peak position
Australia (Kent Music Report)	3
Belgium (Ultratop 50 Flanders)	13
New Zealand (Lever Hit Parade)	1
Sweden (Tio i Topp)	1
UK Singles (Official Charts)	6
US Billboard Hot 100	1
US Hot R&B Sides (Billboard)	1

Chart (2011)	Peak position
France (SNEP)	90

=== Certifications ===
Region	Certification	Certified units/sales
Germany (BVMI)	Gold	300,000^{‡}
Italy (FIMI) sales since 2009	Platinum	100,000^{‡}
New Zealand (RMNZ)	Platinum	30,000^{‡}
Spain (Promusicae)	Gold	30,000^{‡}
United Kingdom (BPI)	Gold	400,000^{‡}
^{‡} Sales+streaming figures based on certification alone.

== The Stampeders version ==
In 1975, Canadian band the Stampeders released a version of the song taken from their album Steamin' featuring DJ Wolfman Jack. The song reached No. 6 in Canada, No. 40 on the US Billboard Hot 100 and No. 41 on the US Cash Box Top 100. The single features a conversation between Wolfman Jack and "Cornelius" -- the real name of Stampeders bassist Ronnie King.

== Other versions ==
In September 2026, American singers Brandy and Pynk Beard's reimagining was released as a single.
