= Nedra Johnson =

American singer-songwriter

- Born: July 27, 1966 (age 59)
- Instruments: guitar, bass, tuba
- Label: Big Mouth Girl Records
- Website: Official website

Nedra Johnson (born July 27, 1966) is an American rhythm and blues and jazz singer/songwriter and multi-instrumentalist. She has performed internationally at jazz, blues, pride and women's music festivals as a solo artist, a tuba player, and vocalist.

== Early life ==
Johnson was born in New York City in 1966. She is the daughter of jazz performer Howard Johnson.

== Career ==
Johnson has performed in internationally in cities including Paris, Nîmes, Berlin, Vienna, Kassel, Munich, Leverkusen, Los Angeles, New York, New Orleans, Los Angeles, Seattle, Portland, San Francisco, Oakland, Cleveland, Madison, Chicago, and New Caledonia. She has also performed with her father Howard Johnson and his group, Gravity.

For many years, she performed as a professional bassist and continues with solo acoustic performances with an R&B flair.

Johnson, a lesbian, is a performer of women's music. On her first album, Testify, she recorded the black lesbian feminist poet Pat Parker's 1978 poem "Where Will You Be?" In 2005, Johnson released her own version of "Amazon Women Rise" as a tribute to the lesbian songwriter Maxine Feldman, a founding figure in women's music.

== Awards ==
Her self-titled release received a 2006 OUTMUSIC Award for Outstanding New Recording-Female.

== Discography ==
=== Albums ===
==== Studio albums ====
- Testify (1998)
- Nedra (2005)

== Notable performances ==
- Michigan Womyn's Music Festival, Wahalla, MI: 2014, 2005, 2003, 2001, 1999, 1998, 1996, 1992
- Queer Is Folk Festival, Chicago, IL: 2005
- National Queer Arts Festival, San Francisco, CA: 2003, 2002
- Femme Funk Festival, Nouméa, New Caledonia: 2002, 1999
- National Women's Music Festival, Muncie, IN: 1998, 1996
