= Margie Hendrix =

American rhythm and blues singer (1935–1973)

- Born: Marjorie Hendrix; March 13, 1935; Register, Georgia, U.S.
- Died: July 14, 1973 (aged 38) New York City, U.S.
- Genres: Jazz; blues; R&B; gospel
- Occupations: Singer; pianist
- Instruments: Vocals; piano
- Years active: 1954–1973
- Labels: Mercury Records; Sound Stage 7
- Formerly of: The Cookies; The Raelettes
- Spouse: Robert Fulson (m. 1966; div. 1968)

Marjorie Hendrix (sometimes spelled "Hendricks") (March 13, 1935 – July 14, 1973) was an American rhythm and blues singer and founding member of the Raelettes, who were the backing singers for Ray Charles, the father of her child, Charles Wayne Hendrix.

She sang lead and background vocals in several of Charles's hit songs of the late 1950s and early 1960s, but after she was ejected from the group in 1964, she attempted a solo career with the labels Mercury Records and Sound Stage 7, before she was dropped from both of them due to her music not making the charts. She battled alcoholism, heroin addiction, depression, and financial instability. She died in 1973, at the age of 38.

== Early years and the Cookies ==
Hendrix was born on March 13, 1935, in Register, Georgia, to the late Kattie and Renzy Hendrix. She was the youngest of three children. She had an older brother, who died when she was about three years old. During her childhood, she played piano and directed her local church choir. In the early 1950s, at the age of 18, she moved to New York City with her older sister and signed a record deal with Lamp records and released her first single, which was "Good Treatment / Every Time" in 1954, but the single did not hit the charts. She left the label in 1955. In 1956, she replaced Beulah Robertson in the Cookies, joining existing members Dorothy Jones and Darlene McCrea. The group signed to Atlantic Records, and had a No. 9 hit single on the R&B chart called "In Paradise". They also started working as session singers at Atlantic, where they were introduced to Ray Charles. The Cookies auditioned for Charles on the song "Leave My Woman Alone". In 1958, Hendrix and McCrea left the Cookies and later formed the Raelettes as Charles's backing singers.

== The Raelettes and Ray Charles ==
In October 1958, Charles recorded his first song with the Raelettes called "Night Time Is the Right Time", which reached No. 5 on the R&B charts. The song is widely known for Hendrix's powerful vocals. There was a mutual attraction between Hendrix and Charles as they started to spend more time with each other and soon they began an affair while Charles was still married. Hendrix eventually became pregnant and gave birth to a son, Charles Wayne Hendrix, on October 1, 1959, in New York City. After she gave birth to Charles Wayne, she tried to convince Charles to leave his wife, Della Beatrice Howard, and live with her and their son, but Charles refused. Hendrix and the Raelettes continued to perform on several of Charles's songs, but during the early 1960s, Hendrix's relationship with Charles began to fall apart and she later started to use alcohol and heroin, and her career began to suffer. Her drug use started to affect her appearance and behavior with the Raelettes; she picked fights during recording sessions, didn't show up to performances, and showed up to performances while intoxicated. In early 1964, the Raelettes released the single "A Lover's Blues", which featured Hendrix on lead vocals, but this was the last song that she recorded with Charles, because in July 1964 during a tour in Europe, Hendrix and Charles got into an argument, and Hendrix revealed to him that she had been secretly having an affair with one of his trumpet players and Charles officially fired Hendrix from the Raelettes and sent her back to the United States.

== Unsuccessful solo career and drug addiction ==
After leaving the Raelettes, in 1965 Hendrix signed a record deal with Mercury Records and the label released the first two out of five singles, ("Now The Hurts On You" and "Baby"), but both of the singles failed to appear on the charts, causing an increase in her use of alcohol and more damaging drugs. In 1966, Hendrix married jazz singer Robert Fulson, who was the brother of singer Lowell Fulson, and they both would perform as the opening act for Lowell at his shows. In 1967, Mercury released three more singles by Hendrix ("One Room Paradise", "Restless", and "I Call You Lover But You Ain't Nothin' But A Tramp"), but the singles also failed to make the charts and her debut album was shelved.

On September 7, 1967, while driving in Texas, Hendrix was involved in a car accident with Fulson when their car was struck by a lumber truck. They both survived, but Hendrix suffered neck injuries and slight hearing loss in her right ear. She was dropped from the Mercury label later that same year, due to her music failing. Hendrix and Fulson divorced in 1968. Hendrix later signed her second record deal with the Sound Stage 7 label that same year and the label released two singles ("Don't Destroy Me" and "Somebody's Gonna Plow Your Field"), but both singles also failed to place on the charts and she was dropped from the label in 1970. In 1971, she became mentally unstable, faded away from the public eye, and quit singing. She continued to use drugs and alcohol for the remainder of her life.

== Death ==
Hendrix died in New York City, on July 14, 1973. The official cause of her death is unknown due to lack of evidence and no autopsy. Most sources say her death was caused by a heroin overdose, but there are rumors she died in a car crash or from cancer. Some sources also say she was nearly penniless around the time of her death.

== In popular culture ==
Margie was portrayed by Regina King in the 2004 film Ray. King received her first NAACP Image Award and Satellite Award for her performance.

== Discography ==
- Every Time / Good Treatment (1954)
- Baby / Packin' Up (1965)
- Now The Hurts On You / I Found My Love (1965)
- I Call You Lover But You Ain't Nothin' But A Tramp / The Question (1967)
- Restless / On The Right Track (1967)
- One Room Paradise / Don't Take Your Good Thing (1967)
- Don't Destroy Me / Jim Dandy (1968)
- Somebody's Gonna Plow Your Field / Your Mama's Recipe (1969)
