= Edgar Willis =

American jazz musician

Edgar Willis is a jazz bassist. He toured regularly with Ray Charles in the 1950s and 1960s. Together they recorded hits such as "Hit the Road Jack", "What'd I Say", and "I Got a Woman".

Willis was also a member of the late 1950s Sonny Stitt Quartet, with Bobby Timmons and Kenny Dennis.

== Discography ==
With Curtis Amy

- Mustang (Verve, 1967)

With Ray Charles

- The Genius of Ray Charles (Atlantic, 1959)

With Hank Crawford

- The Soul Clinic (Atlantic, 1962)
- From the Heart (Atlantic, 1962)
- True Blue (Atlantic, 1964)
- Dig These Blues (Atlantic, 1966)

With David "Fathead" Newman

- Fathead Comes On (Atlantic, 1962)

With Sonny Stitt

- 37 Minutes and 48 Seconds with Sonny Stitt (Roost, 1957)
- Personal Appearance (Verve, 1957)
