= Atlantic Records discography =

This is an Atlantic Records Discography, albums released on the Atlantic Records label from its founding up until 1982, ordered by catalog number. Two of the major series of LP recordings were the "1200" and "8000" series, started by Nesuhi Ertegun. The "1200" series was reserved for jazz albums. The "8000" and subsequent series, started shortly after the 1200 in 1956, featured Atlantic's R&B and pop albums; when the "1200" series was discontinued in the 1970s, the jazz albums were mixed with the R&B and pop albums in their respective series. This list includes albums using Atlantic's numbering system that were released under their numerous subsidiary labels. There is a section containing albums related to the label as well.

== Discography ==
=== 100 & 400 10-inch LP Series ===
Atlantic's first 33⅓ RPM LP records were 10-inch albums and their first release in 1949 was a recording of Walter Benton's poetry set to music which was also issued as three 12 inch 78 RPM records. This was followed by two albums in 1950 with the bulk of Atlantic's 10-inch albums released between 1951 and 1953. The 100 Series released mainly instrumental jazz LPs and the 400 Series featured vocalists. The album catalog numbers were often denoted by the prefix "LP" on the album cover and "ALS" or "ALR" on the record label.

Catalog	Artist	Album	Notes
110	John Dall and Vernon Duke	This Is My Beloved	Also released as a 12-inch 3 record 78 RPM set
108	Joe Bushkin	I Love a Piano	
109	Erroll Garner	Rhapsody	
111	Marie Powers	Heart Songs	
112	Erroll Garner	Erroll Garner: Piano Solos	
113	Billy Taylor	Piano Panorama	Volume 1 of Piano Panorama Series – reissued as part of LP 1277
114	Mary Lou Williams	Piano Panorama	Volume 2 of Piano Panorama Series
115	Ruth Brown	Ruth Brown Sings Rhythm and Blues Favorites	Unreleased
116	Sarah Vaughan	Sarah Vaughan Sings	
117	Don Byas	Tenor Sax Solos	
118	Sidney Bechet	Soprano Sax Solos	
119	Django Reinhardt	Jazz Guitar	
120	Earl Hines	A Fabulous Collection of His Most Famous Piano Solos	Compilation of recordings originally released on QRS Records
121	Barney Bigard	Fantasy for Clarinet and Strings	
122	Burt Hilber	Square Dance Party	
123	Drums of Haiti	Haiti Dances	Recorded in Haiti under the supervision of Nicky Peters
124	Various Artists	Waltzes of Vienna	
125	Lou Hawkins	Goldie Plays By the Sea	
126	Pee Wee Russell	Pee Wee Russell	
127	Jimmy Jones	Jimmy Jones: Piano Solos	
128	Erroll Garner	Passport to Fame	Erroll Garner's First Recordings
129	Howard McGhee	Be-Bop	
130	Jimmy Yancey & Mama Yancey	Yancey Special	
131	Al Hibbler	Al Hibbler	Unreleased
132	Barbara Carroll	Piano Panorama	Volume 3 of the Piano Panorama Series
133	Meade Lux Lewis	Interpretations of the Great Boogie-Woogie Styles	
134	Jimmy Yancey	Jimmy Yancey: Piano Solos	
135	Erroll Garner	Erroll Garner: Piano Solos Vol. II	
136	Ellis Larkins	Piano Panorama	Volume 4 of the Piano Panorama Series
137	Sylvia Syms	Songs By Sylvia Syms	
138	Dizzy Gillespie	Dizzy Volume I	Compilation of French recordings for the Blue Star label
139	Various Artists	Dixieland at Jazz, Ltd. Volume 1	Featuring Miff Mole, Doc Evans, Ralph Blank, Doc Cenardo, Sy Nelson, and Bill Reinhardt
140	Various Artists	Dixieland at Jazz, Ltd. Volume 2	Featuring Sidney Bechet, Muggsy Spanier, Doc Evans, Don Ewell, Wally Gordon, Munn Ware, Sid Thall and Bill Reinhardt
141	Wilbur de Paris	Rampart St. Ramblers	
142	Dizzy Gillespie	Dizzy Volume 2	Compilation of French recordings for the Blue Star label
143	Wilbur de Paris	Rampart St. Ramblers Volume 2	
144	Johnny Hodges with Harry Carney	Johnny Hodges with Harry Carney	
402	Mabel Mercer	Songs by Mabel Mercer Volume One	
403	Mabel Mercer	Songs by Mabel Mercer Volume Two	
404	Mae Barnes	Fun with Mae Barnes	
405	Greta Keller	Greta Keller Sings Kurt Weill	
406	Hugh Shannon	Hugh Shannon Sings and Plays	
407	Vernon Duke	Vernon Duke Plays Vernon Duke	Vocals by Dorothy Richards and Huguette Ferley
408	Mabel Mercer	Songs by Mabel Mercer Volume Two	
409	George Byron	George Byron Sings Jerome Kern	
410	George Byron	George Byron Sings George Gershwin	

=== The 1200 – 1700 series ===
Atlantic commenced releasing 12 inch LP records with the establishment of their 1200 series in 1949 with an album consisting of three 78 RPM records of Walter Benton's poetry. This was followed by a two record set of William Shakespeare's Romeo and Juliet in 1951. Subsequent releases featured Dixieland, opera and selections from Broadway musicals before Nesuhi Ertegun took over responsibility for the LP series in 1955 and the series focused almost exclusively on jazz releases. After one a very early experiment in 1953 stereo releases of Atlantic LPs began production in 1958 and by 1960 all releases were available in mono or stereo pressings—indicated by the prefix SD on the catalog number. The series continued until late 1977 when it concluded with SD 1700 and most of the popular jazz artists moved to the SD 18100 Series and a limited number of albums were released on the 8800 Series.

==== 1200 series ====
Catalog number	Year	Artist	Title	Notes
1201–3	1949	John Dall and Vernon Duke	This Is My Beloved	3 record 78 RPM set
1204–5	1951	Eva Le Gallienne and Richard Waring with Dennis King	Romeo and Juliet Scenes	2 record 33⅓ RPM set produced by Margaret Webster
1206	1952	Sidney Bechet and Muggsy Spanier	Duets	
1207	1952	Marie Powers	Marie Powers Concert	
1208	1952	Wilbur de Paris	Wilbur de Paris and His Rampart Street Ramblers	Issued in "binaural," an early stereo process
1209	1953	Jack Teagarden and Rex Stewart	Big Jazz	
1210	1954	Charles Sherrill	Charles Sherrill Plays Music from "Show Boat" and "Roberta"	
1211	1954	Charles Sherrill	Charles Sherrill Plays Music from "Pal Joey" and "A Connecticut Yankee"	
1212	1955	Shorty Rogers and His Giants	The Swinging Mr. Rogers	First album produced by Nesuhi Ertegun
1213	1955	Mabel Mercer	Mabel Mercer Sings Cole Porter	
1214	1955	Bobby Short	Songs by Bobby Short	
1215	1955	Paul Barbarin	Paul Barbarin and His New Orleans Jazz	
1216	1955	Dave Pell Octet	Jazz & Romantic Places	
1217	1955	Lee Konitz and Warne Marsh	Lee Konitz with Warne Marsh	
1218	1955	Ted Straeter	Ted Straeter's New York	
1219	1955	Wilbur de Paris	Wilbur de Paris and His New New Orleans Jazz	
1220	1955	Tony Fruscella	Tony Fruscella	
1221	1955	George Wein	Wein, Women & Song	
1222	1956	Alec Templeton	The Magic Piano	
1223	1956	Jack Montrose with Bob Gordon	Arranged/Played/Composed by Jack Montrose	
1224	1956	Lennie Tristano	Lennie Tristano	
1225	1956	Jess Stacy and the Famous Sidemen	Tribute to Benny Goodman	
1226	1955	Betty Bennett	Nobody Else but Me	
1227	1956	Erroll Garner	The Greatest Garner	
1228	1956	Chris Connor	Chris Connor	
1229	1956	Teddy Charles	The Teddy Charles Tentet	
1230	1956	Bobby Short	Bobby Short	
1231	1956	The Modern Jazz Quartet	Fontessa	
1232	1956	Shorty Rogers and His Giants	Martians Come Back!	
1233	1956	Wilbur de Paris and His New New Orleans Jazz	Marchin' and Shoutin'	
1234	1956	Joe Turner	The Boss of the Blues	
1235	1956	Phineas Newborn, Jr.	Here Is Phineas	
1236	1956	Cy Walter	Rodgers Revisited	
1237	1956	Charles Mingus	Pithecanthropus Erectus	
1238	1956	Jimmy Giuffre	The Jimmy Giuffre Clarinet	
1239	1956	Various artists	Rock and Roll Forever	Featuring Joe Turner, LaVern Baker, The Clovers, Clyde McPhatter & The Drifters, Ray Charles, Ruth Brown and T-Bone Walker
1240	1956	Chris Connor	He Loves Me, He Loves Me Not	
1241	1956	Bill Russo	The World of Alcina	
1242	1956	Milt Jackson	Ballads & Blues	
1243	1956	Sylvia Syms	Sylvia Syms Sings	
1244	1956	Mabel Mercer	Midnight at Mabel Mercer's	
1245	1956	Patty McGovern and Thomas Talbert	Wednesday's Child	
1246	1956	Lars Gullin	Baritone Sax	
1247	1956	The Modern Jazz Quartet and Jimmy Giuffre	The Modern Jazz Quartet at Music Inn	
1248	1956	The Clovers	The Clovers	
1249	1956	Dave Pell Octet	Love Story	
1250	1956	Thomas Talbert	Bix, Duke, Fats	
1251	1956	Al Hibbler	After the Lights Go Down Low	
1252	1956	Alfred Ryder and Vernon Duke	This Is My Beloved	
1253	1957	Wilbur de Paris	Wilbur de Paris at Symphony Hall	
1254	1957	Jimmy Giuffre	The Jimmy Giuffre 3	
1255	1957	Joe Mooney	Lush Life	
1256	1957	Carol Stevens with Phil Moore's Music	That Satin Doll	
1257	1957	Dizzy Gillespie	Dizzy at Home and Abroad	
1258	1957	Lee Konitz	Inside Hi-Fi	
1259	1957	Ray Charles	The Great Ray Charles	
1260	1957	Charles Mingus	The Clown	
1261	1957	Various artists	Dixieland at Jazz, Ltd.	Featuring Sidney Bechet, Muggsy Spanier, Doc Evans, Don Ewell and Bill Reinhardt
1262	1957	Bobby Short	Speaking of Love	
1263	1957	Frances Wayne	The Warm Sound	
1264	1957	Joe Castro	Mood Jazz	
1265	1957	The Modern Jazz Quartet	The Modern Jazz Quartet	
1266	1957	Wilbur de Paris and Jimmy Witherspoon	New Orleans Blues	
1267	1957	John Lewis & Sacha Distel	Afternoon in Paris	
1268	1957	Conte Candoli & Lou Levy	West Coast Wailers	
1269	1957	Milt Jackson	Plenty, Plenty Soul	
1270	1957	Shorty Rogers and His Giants	Way Up There	
1271	1957	Mary Lou Williams/Barbara Carroll	Ladies of Jazz	
1272	1957	John Lewis	The John Lewis Piano	
1273	1957	Lee Konitz	The Real Lee Konitz	
1274	1957	Teddy Charles	Word from Bird	
1275	1957	George Wallington	Knight Music	
1276	1958	Jimmy Giuffre and His Music Men	The Music Man	
1277	1958	Billy Taylor	The Billy Taylor Touch	Includes seven 1951 recordings originally issued on Piano Panorama with four tracks from 1957
1278	1958	Art Blakey's Jazz Messengers with Thelonious Monk	Art Blakey's Jazz Messengers with Thelonious Monk	
1279	1957	Milt Jackson & Ray Charles	Soul Brothers	
1280	1958	The Jazz Modes	The Most Happy Fella	
1281	1958	LaVern Baker	LaVern Baker Sings Bessie Smith	
1282	1958	Jimmy Giuffre	Trav'lin' Light	
1283	1958	Jimmy Yancey and Mama Yancey	Pure Blues	
1284	1958	The Modern Jazz Quartet	The Modern Jazz Quartet Plays No Sun in Venice	
1285	1958	Bobby Short	Sing Me a Swing Song	
1286	1958	Chris Connor	A Jazz Date with Chris Connor	
1287	1957	Various Artists	Jazz Piano International	Featuring Derek Smith, Dick Katz and René Urtreger
1288	1958	Wilbur de Paris	Wilbur de Paris Plays Cole Porter	
1289	1958	Ray Charles	Ray Charles at Newport	
1290	1958	Chris Connor	Chris Craft	
1291	1958	Warne Marsh	Warne Marsh	
1292	1959	Chris Barber	Here Is Chris Barber	
1293	1959	George Byron	Premiere Performance!	George Byron Sings New & Rediscovered Jerome Kern Songs
1294	1959	Milt Jackson	Bags & Flutes	
1295	1959	Jimmy Giuffre	The Four Brothers Sound	
1296	1959	Various Artists	Voodoo Drums in Hi-Fi	Authentic ceremonial & street music recorded in Haiti with native musicians & singers
1297	1959	Young Tuxedo Brass Band	Jazz Begins	
1298	1959	Various artists	Historic Jazz Concert at Music Inn	Featuring Jimmy Giuffre, Teddy Charles, Pee Wee Russell, Dick Katz, Herbie Mann, Oscar Pettiford, Rex Stewart, Ray Brown, George Wein and Connie Kay
1299	1958	The Modern Jazz Quartet and Sonny Rollins	The Modern Jazz Quartet at Music Inn Volume 2	
1300	1959	Wilbur de Paris	Wilbur de Paris Plays Something Old, New, Gay, Blue	

==== 1300 series ====
Catalog number	Year	Artist	Title	Notes
1301	1959	Mabel Mercer	Once in a Blue Moon	
1302	1959	Bobby Short	The Mad Twenties	
1303	1959	Vic Dickenson/Joe Thomas	Mainstream	
1304	1960	David "Fathead" Newman	Fathead	
1305	1960	Charles Mingus	Blues & Roots	
1306	1959	Julius Watkins and Charlie Rouse	The Jazz Modes	
1307	1959	Chris Connor	Ballads of the Sad Cafe	
1308	1959	Ruth Brown	Late Date with Ruth Brown	
1309	N/A	Chris Connor	Chris Connor Sings the George Gershwin Almanac of Song, Vol. 1	unreleased
1310	N/A	Chris Connor	Chris Connor Sings the George Gershwin Almanac of Song, Vol. 2	unreleased
1311	1960	John Coltrane	Giant Steps	
1312	1959	Ray Charles	The Genius of Ray Charles	
1313	1959	John Lewis	Improvised Meditations and Excursions	
1314	1959	Dick Katz	Piano & Pen	
1315	N/A	Erroll Garner	Perpetual Emotion	unreleased
1316	1960	Milt Jackson and Coleman Hawkins	Bean Bags	
1317	1959	Ornette Coleman	The Shape of Jazz to Come	
1318	1959	Wilbur de Paris & His New New Orleans Jazz	That's a Plenty	
1319	1959	Harry Lookofsky	Stringsville	
1320	1960	Bob Brookmeyer	Portrait of the Artist	
1321	1960	Bobby Short	On the East Side	
1322	1960	Mabel Mercer	Merely Marvelous Mabel Mercer	
1323	1960	Buster Smith	The Legendary Buster Smith	
1324	1960	Joe Castro	Groove Funk Soul	
1325	1960	The Modern Jazz Quartet	Pyramid	
1326	1960	Professor Irwin Corey	Win with Irwin	The World's Foremost Authority Campaigns at the Playboy Club
1327	1960	Ornette Coleman	Change of the Century	
1328	1960	Woody Herman	Woody Herman's Big New Herd at the Monterey Jazz Festival	
1329	1959	Billy Taylor	One for Fun	
1330	1960	Jimmy Giuffre	Western Suite	
1331	1960	Newport Jazz Festival All Stars	Newport Jazz Festival All Stars	Buck Clayton, Vic Dickenson, Pee Wee Russell, Bud Freeman, George Wein, Champ Jones and Jake Hanna
1332	1960	Joe Turner	Big Joe Rides Again	
1333	1960	Ronnie Ross & Allan Ganley	The Jazz Makers	
1334	1960	John Lewis	The Golden Striker	
1335	1960	Fred Kaz	Eastern Exposure	
1336	1960	Wilbur de Paris	The Wild Jazz Age	Wilbur de Paris Plays Music of the 1920s
1337	1961	Various artists	The Blues in Modern Jazz	
1338	1961	Various artists	Jazz at Jazz, Ltd.	Featuring Bill Reinhardt and Max Hook
1339	1960	Slide Hampton	Sister Salvation	
1340	1960	Philly Joe Jones	Philly Joe's Beat	
1341	1960	Bobby Scott	The Compleat Musician	
1342	1960	Milt Jackson	The Ballad Artistry of Milt Jackson	
1343	1960	Herbie Mann	The Common Ground	
1344	1960	Lurlean Hunter	Blue and Sentimental	
1345	1960	The Modern Jazz Quartet	Third Stream Music	
1346	1960	Various artists	Southern Folk Heritage Series: Sounds of the South	
1347	1960	Various artists	Southern Folk Heritage Series: Blue Ridge Mountain Music	
1348	1960	Various artists	Southern Folk Heritage Series: Roots of the Blues	
1349	1960	Various artists	Southern Folk Heritage Series: White Spirituals	
1350	1960	Various artists	Southern Folk Heritage Series: American Folk Songs for Children	
1351	1960	Various artists	Southern Folk Heritage Series: Negro Church Music	
1352	1960	Various artists	Southern Folk Heritage Series: The Blues Roll On	
1353	1961	Ornette Coleman	This Is Our Music	
1354	1961	John Coltrane	Coltrane Jazz	
1355	1961	Bobby Scott	A Taste of Honey	
1356	1961	Hank Crawford	More Soul	
1357	1962	Lennie Tristano	The New Tristano	
1358	1961	Leo Wright	Blues Shout	
1359	1961	The Modern Jazz Quartet	The Modern Jazz Quartet & Orchestra	
1360	1961	Ray Charles and Milt Jackson	Soul Meeting	
1361	1961	John Coltrane	My Favorite Things	
1362	1961	Slide Hampton	Somethin' Sanctified	
1363	1961	Wilbur de Paris	Wilbur DeParis on the Riviera	
1364	1961	Ornette Coleman	Free Jazz: A Collective Improvisation	
1365	1961	John Lewis/Gunther Schuller/Jim Hall	Jazz Abstractions	
1366	1961	David "Fathead" Newman	Straight Ahead	
1367	1962	Laurence Harvey & Herbie Mann	This Is My Beloved	
1368	1961	Milt Jackson & John Coltrane	Bags & Trane	
1369	1961	Ray Charles	The Genius After Hours	
1370	1961	John Lewis	Original Sin	Music for Ballet
1371	1961	Herbie Mann	The Family of Mann	
1372	1962	Hank Crawford	The Soul Clinic	
1373	1961	John Coltrane	Olé Coltrane	
1374	1962	The Mitchell-Ruff Trio	The Catbird Seat	
1375	1961	John Lewis	The Wonderful World of Jazz	
1376	1962	Red Mitchell-Harold Land Quintet	Hear Ye!	
1377	1962	Charles Mingus	Oh Yeah	
1378	1962	Ornette Coleman	Ornette!	
1379	1962	Slide Hampton	Jazz with a Twist	
1380	1962	Herbie Mann	Herbie Mann at the Village Gate	
1381	1962	The Modern Jazz Quartet	Lonely Woman	
1382	1962	John Coltrane	Coltrane Plays the Blues	
1383	1962	LaVern Baker, Chris Connor, Herbie Mann & Bobby Short	Richard Rodgers' No Strings: An After-Theatre Version	
1384	1962	Herbie Mann	Right Now	
1385	1962	The Modern Jazz Quartet	European Concert, Vol. 1	
1386	1962	The Modern Jazz Quartet	European Concert, Vol. 2	
1387	1962	Hank Crawford	From the Heart	
1388	1962	John Lewis	A Milanese Story	Original Soundtrack
1389	1962	Mose Allison	I Don't Worry About a Thing	
1390	1962	The Modern Jazz Quartet	The Comedy	
1391	1962	Stephane Grappelli	Feeling + Finesse = Jazz	
1392	1962	John Lewis & Svend Asmussen	European Encounter	
1393	1962	Leo Wright	Suddenly the Blues	
1394	1962	Ornette Coleman	Ornette on Tenor	
1395	1962	Sonny Stitt	Sonny Stitt & the Top Brass	
1396	1962	Slide Hampton	Explosion! The Sound of Slide Hampton	
1397	1963	Herbie Mann	Do the Bossa Nova with Herbie Mann	
1398	1963	Mose Allison	Swingin' Machine	
1399	1963	Dave Newman	Fathead Comes On	
1400	1963	Charles Bell	Another Dimension	

==== 1400 series ====
Catalog number	Year	Artist	Title	Notes
1401	1966	Kenny Clarke & Francy Boland	Jazz Is Universal	
1402	1964	John Lewis, Albert Mangelsdorff & The Zagreb Jazz Quartet	Animal Dance	
1403	1963	Dudley Moore	Plays the Theme from "Beyond the Fringe" and All That Jazz	
1404	1963	Clarke-Boland Big Band	Handle with Care	
1405	1963	Hank Crawford	Soul of the Ballad	
1406	1963	Jack Wilson	The Jack Wilson Quartet featuring Roy Ayers	
1407	1963	Herbie Mann	Herbie Mann Returns to the Village Gate	
1408	1963	Eureka Brass Band of New Orleans	Jazz at Preservation Hall 1	
1409	1963	Billie Pierce & De De Pierce/Jim Robinson's New Orleans Band	Jazz at Preservation Hall 2	
1410	1963	Paul Barbarin & His Jazz Band/Punch Miller's Bunch & George Lewis	Jazz at Preservation Hall 3	
1411	1963	George Lewis Band of New Orleans	Jazz at Preservation Hall 4	
1412	1963	Art Farmer Quartet featuring Jim Hall	Interaction	
1413	1963	Herbie Mann	Herbie Mann Live at Newport	
1414	1964	The Modern Jazz Quartet	The Sheriff	
1415	N/A	Erroll Garner	unreleased	unreleased
1416	1965	Charles Mingus	Tonight at Noon	
1417	1964	Milt Jackson	Vibrations	
1418	1964	Sonny Stitt	Stitt Plays Bird	
1419	1964	John Coltrane	Coltrane's Sound	
1420	1964	The Modern Jazz Quartet/Quartetto di Milano/Hungarian Gypsy Quartet	A Quartet Is a Quartet Is a Quartet	
1421	1964	Art Farmer Quartet featuring Jim Hall	Live at the Half-Note	
1422	1964	Herbie Mann	Latin Fever	
1423	1964	Hank Crawford	True Blue	
1424	1964	Mose Allison	The Word from Mose	
1425	1964	John Lewis	Essence	John Lewis Plays the Compositions & Arrangements of Gary McFarland
1426	1964	Herbie Mann & the Bill Evans Trio	Nirvana	
1427	1964	Jack Wilson	The Two Sides of Jack Wilson	
1428	1964	Philly Joe Jones & Elvin Jones	Together!	
1429	1964	The Modern Jazz Quartet with Laurindo Almeida	Collaboration	
1430	1964	Art Farmer Quartet featuring Jim Hall	To Sweden With Love	
1431	1964	Johnny Griffin & Matthew Gee	Soul Groove	
1432	1965	Hubert Laws	The Laws of Jazz	
1433	1965	Herbie Mann	My Kinda Groove	
1434	1965	Sérgio Mendes	The Swinger from Rio	
1435	1965	Max Roach	The Max Roach Trio featuring the Legendary Hasaan	
1436	1965	Hank Crawford	Dig These Blues	
1437	1965	Herbie Mann	Herbie Mann Plays The Roar of the Greasepaint – The Smell of the Crowd	
1438	1965	Grassella Oliphant	The Grass Roots	
1439	1965	Nat Adderley	Autobiography	
1440	1965	The Modern Jazz Quartet	The Modern Jazz Quartet Plays George Gershwin's Porgy and Bess	
1441	1965	Ted Curson	The New Thing & the Blue Thing	
1442	1965	Art Farmer Quartet	Sing Me Softly of the Blues	
1443	1965	Elvin Jones	And Then Again	
1444	1965	Clifford Jordan	These are My Roots: Clifford Jordan Plays Leadbelly	
1445	1965	Herbie Mann	Standing Ovation at Newport	
1446	1966	Eddie Higgins	Soulero	
1447	1965	Dorothy Ashby	The Fantastic Jazz Harp of Dorothy Ashby	
1448	1965	Eddie Harris	The In Sound	
1449	1966	The Modern Jazz Quartet and the All Star Jazz Band	Jazz Dialogue	
1450	1966	Mose Allison	Mose Alive!	
1451	1967	John Coltrane & Don Cherry	The Avant-Garde	
1452	1966	Hubert Laws	Flute By-Laws	
1453	1966	Eddie Harris	Mean Greens	
1454	1966	Herbie Mann	Today!	
1455	1966	Hank Crawford	After Hours	
1456	1966	Mose Allison	Wild Man on the Loose	
1457	1966	Dave Pike	Jazz for the Jet Set	
1458	1966	The Mitchell-Ruff Trio	After This Message	
1459	1966	Charles Lloyd Quartet	Dream Weaver	
1460	1966	Nat Adderley	Sayin' Somethin'	
1461	1966	The Quartette Tres Bien	Bully!	
1462	1966	Herbie Mann	Monday Night at the Village Gate	
1463	1966	Brother Jack McDuff	A Change Is Gonna Come	
1464	1966	Herbie Mann	Our Mann Flute	
1465	1966	Joe Harriott-John Mayer Double Quintet	Indo-Jazz Suite	
1466	1966	Sérgio Mendes	The Great Arrival	
1467	1966	Max Roach	Drums Unlimited	
1468	1966	The Modern Jazz Quartet	Blues at Carnegie Hall	
1469	1966	Shelly Manne	Boss Sounds!	
1470	1967	Hank Crawford	Mr. Blues	
1471	1966	Herbie Mann	New Mann at Newport	
1472	1967	Brother Jack McDuff	Tobacco Road	
1473	1967	Charles Lloyd	Forest Flower	
1474	1967	Nat Adderley	Live at Memory Lane	
1475	1967	Herbie Mann	Impressions of the Middle East	
1476	1967	Ira Sullivan	Horizons	
1477	1967	Freddie Hubbard	Backlash	
1478	1967	Eddie Harris	The Tender Storm	
1479	1967	Junior Mance	Harlem Lullaby	
1480	1967	Sérgio Mendes	The Beat of Brazil	
1481	1967	Charles Lloyd Quartet	Love-In	
1482	1967	Joe Harriott–John Mayer Double Quintet	Indo-Jazz Fusions	
1483	1967	Herbie Mann	The Beat Goes On	
1484	1967	Brother Jack McDuff	Do It Now!	
1485	1967	Elvin Jones	Midnight Walk	
1486	1967	The Modern Jazz Quartet	Live At The Lighthouse	
1487	1967	Shelly Manne & His Men	Jazz Gunn	
1488	1967	Roy Ayers	Virgo Vibes	
1489	1967	David Newman	House Of David	
1490	1967	Herbie Mann	The Herbie Mann String Album	
1491	1967	Jimmy Owens–Kenny Barron Quintet	You Had Better Listen	
1492	1967	The Freedom Sounds	People Get Ready	
1493	1967	Charles Lloyd Quartet	Journey Within	
1494	1967	Grassella Oliphant	The Grass Is Greener	
1495	1968	Eddie Harris	The Electrifying Eddie Harris	
1496	1968	Junior Mance	I Believe to My Soul	
1497	1967	Herbie Mann	The Wailing Dervishes	
1498	1968	Brother Jack McDuff & David Newman	Double Barrelled Soul	
1499	1968	Yusef Lateef	The Complete Yusef Lateef	
1500	1968	Charles Lloyd	Charles Lloyd in Europe	

==== 1500 series ====
Catalog number	Year	Artist	Title	Notes
1501	1968	Freddie Hubbard	High Blues Pressure	
1502	1968	Roland Kirk	The Inflated Tear	
1503	1968	Hank Crawford	Double Cross	
1504	1968	Rufus Harley	A Tribute to Courage	
1505	1968	David Newman	Bigger & Better	
1506	1968	Eddie Harris	Plug Me In	
1507	1968	Herbie Mann	Windows Opened	
1508	1968	Yusef Lateef	The Blue Yusef Lateef	
1509	1968	Hubert Laws	Laws' Cause	
1510	1968	Max Roach	Members, Don't Git Weary	
1511	1968	Mose Allison	I've Been Doin' Some Thinkin'	
1512	1968	The Freedom Sounds featuring Wayne Henderson	Soul Sound System	
1513	1968	Herbie Mann	The Inspiration I Feel	
1514	1968	Roy Ayers	Stoned Soul Picnic	
1515	1968	Shirley Scott	Soul Song	
1516	1968	Les McCann	Much Les	
1517	1968	Eddie Harris	Silver Cycles	
1518	1968	Roland Kirk	Left And Right	
1519	1969	Charles Lloyd	Soundtrack	
1520	1968	Clare Fischer	Thesaurus	
1521	1968	Junior Mance	Live at the Top	Guest Artist: David Newmam
1522	1968	Herbie Mann	Memphis Underground	
1523	1969	Hank Crawford	Mr. Blues Plays Lady Soul	
1524	1968	David Newman	The Many Facets of David Newman	
1525	1969	Yusef Lateef	Yusef Lateef's Detroit	
1526	1968	Freddie Hubbard	A Soul Experiment	
1527	1968	Luis Gasca	The Little Giant	
1528	1969	Various Artists	Jazz Super Hits	featuring Eddie Harris, John Coltrane, Herbie Mann, Ray Charles and The Modern Jazz Quartet with Laurindo Almeida
1529:	1969	Eddie Harris	High Voltage	
1530	1969	Phil Moore Jr.	Right On	
1531	1969	Gary Burton	Throb	
1532	1969	Shirley Scott	Shirley Scott & the Soul Saxes	
1533	1969	George Wein	George Wein's Newport All Stars	
1534	1970	Roland Kirk	Volunteered Slavery	
1535	1969	Bobby Short	Jump for Joy	
1536	1969	Herbie Mann	Live at the Whisky a Go Go	
1537	1969	Les McCann & Eddie Harris	Swiss Movement	Recorded Live at The Montreux Jazz Festival, Switzerland
1538	1969	Roy Ayers	Daddy Bug	
1539	1970	Rufus Harley	Kings/Queens	
1540	1969	Herbie Mann	Concerto Grosso in D Blues	
1541	1969	John Coltrane	The Best of John Coltrane	
1542	1969	Mose Allison	The Best of Mose Allison	
1543	1970	Ray Charles	The Best of Ray Charles	
1544	1970	Herbie Mann	The Best of Herbie Mann	
1545	1970	Eddie Harris	The Best of Eddie Harris	
1546	1970	The Modern Jazz Quartet	The Best of The Modern Jazz Quartet	
1547	1970	Les McCann	Comment	
1548	1969	Yusef Lateef	The Diverse Yusef Lateef	
1549	1969	Freddie Hubbard	The Black Angel	
1550	1970	Mose Allison	Hello There, Universe	
1551	1970	Clarence Wheeler & The Enforcers	Doin' What We Wanna	
1552	1970	Wilbur de Paris	Over and Over Again	
1553	1970	John Coltrane	The Coltrane Legacy	
1554	1970	Eddie Harris	Come On Down!	
1555	1970	Charles Mingus	The Best of Charles Mingus	
1556	1970	Charles Lloyd	The Best of Charles Lloyd	
1557	1970	Hank Crawford	The Best of Hank Crawford	
1558	1970	Ornette Coleman	The Best of Ornette Coleman	
1559	1970	Various Artists	Jazz Super Hits Vol. 2	Featuring John Coltrane, Charles Lloyd, Hank Crawford, Ray Charles & David Newman, Herbie Mann, Jack McDuff and Yusef Lateef
1560	1970	Gary Burton	Good Vibes	
1561	1970	Shirley Scott	Something	
1562	1970	Junior Mance	With a Lotta Help from My Friends	
1563	1970	Yusef Lateef	Suite 16	
1564	1971	Ray Bryant	MCMLXX	
1565	1970	Esther Phillips	Burnin'	
1566	1970	Gary William Friedman and Will Holt	The Me Nobody Knows	Original Cast Recording
1567	1970	Mongo Santamaría	Mongo '70	
1568	1970	Carmen McRae	Just a Little Lovin'	
1569	1970	Roberta Flack	Chapter Two	
1570	1970	World's Greatest Jazz Band	The World's Greatest Jazz Band of Yank Lawson and Bob Haggart Live	
1571	1970	Charles Lloyd	Charles Lloyd in the Soviet Union	
1572	1970	Ornette Coleman	The Art of the Improvisers	
1573	1970	Eddie Harris	Free Speech	
1574	1970	Bobby Short	Nobody Else But Me	
1575	1970	Rahsaan Roland Kirk	Rahsaan Rahsaan	
1576	1970	Freddie Hubbard and İlhan Mimaroğlu	Sing Me a Song of Songmy	
1577	1971	Gary Burton and Keith Jarrett	Gary Burton & Keith Jarrett	
1578	1971	Rahsaan Roland Kirk	Natural Black Inventions: Root Strata	
1579	1971	Joe Zawinul	Zawinul	
1580	1970	Duke Ellington	New Orleans Suite	
1581	1970	Mongo Santamaria	Mongo's Way	
1582	1970	World's Greatest Jazz Band of Yank Lawson and Bob Haggart	What's New?	
1583	1971	Eddie Harris and Les McCann	Second Movement	
1584	1971	Mose Allison	Western Man	
1585	1971	Clarence Wheeler and The Enforcers	The Love I've Been Looking For	
1586	1971	Charles Lloyd Quartet	The Flowering	
1587	1971	Max Roach with the J.C. White Singers	Lift Every Voice And Sing	
1588	1971	Ornette Coleman	Twins	
1589	1971	The Modern Jazz Quartet	Plastic Dreams	
1590	1970	David Newman	The Best of David Newman	
1591	1971	Yusef Lateef	The Best of Yusef Lateef	
1592	1971	Rahsaan Roland Kirk	The Best of Rahsaan Roland Kirk	
1593	1971	Mongo Santamaria	Mongo at Montreux	
1594	1971	Roberta Flack	Quiet Fire	
1595	1971	Eddie Harris	Live At Newport	
1596	1971	Keith Jarrett	The Mourning of a Star	
1597	1971	Gary Burton & Stephane Grappelli	Paris Encounter	
1598	1971	Gary Burton	Alone at Last	
1599	1972	Isaac Hayes	In the Beginning	Reissue of Presenting Isaac Hayes originally released on the Enterprise label (SD 13–100)
1600	1972	David Newman	Lonely Avenue	

==== 1600 series ====
Catalog number	Year	Artist	Title	Notes
1601	1971	Rahsaan Roland Kirk	Blacknuss	
1602	1972	Yusef Lateef	The Gentle Giant	
1603	1972	Les McCann	Invitation to Openness	
1604	1972	Richard Evans	Dealing with Hard Times	
1605	1971	Don Shirley	The Don Shirley Point of View	
1606	1971	Dave Brubeck	Truth Is Fallen	
1607	1972	Dave Brubeck	The Last Set at Newport	
1608	1971	Charlie Mariano	Mirror	
1609	1971	Randy Weston	African Cookbook	
1610	1972	Herbie Mann	Mississippi Gambler	
1611	1971	Eddie Harris	Instant Death	
1612	1971	Keith Jarrett	Birth	
1613	1971	Turk Murphy	The Many Faces of Ragtime	
1614	1971	Billie Holiday	Strange Fruit	
1615	N/A	Jelly Roll Morton	Unissued	Unissued
1616	N/A	Coleman Hawkins	Unissued	Unissued
1617	N/A	Chu Berry and Ben Webster	Unissued	Unissued
1618	N/A	Lester Young	Unissued	Unissued
1619	1972	Les McCann	Talk to the People	
1620	1972	Bobby Short	The Very Best of Bobby Short	
1621	1972	Mongo Santamaria	Up from the Roots	
1622	1972	Miroslav Vitous	Mountain in the Clouds	
1623	1972	The Modern Jazz Quartet	The Legendary Profile	
1624	1972	Hubert Laws	Wild Flower	
1625	1972	Eddie Harris	Eddie Harris Sings the Blues	
1626	1972	Ray Bryant	Alone at Montreux	
1627	1972	Mose Allison	Mose in Your Ear	
1628	1972	Von Freeman	Doin' It Right Now	
1629	1972	Oscar Brown, Jr.	Movin' On	
1630	1972	Rahsaan Roland Kirk & Al Hibbler	A Meeting of the Times	
1631	1972	Ella Fitzgerald	Ella Loves Cole	
1632	1972	Herbie Mann	Hold On, I'm Coming	
1633	1973	Robin Kenyatta	Gypsy Man	
1634	1973	Young-Holt Unlimited	Oh, Girl	
1635	1973	Yusef Lateef	Hush 'N' Thunder	
1636	1972	Clarence Wheeler	The New Chicago Blues	
1637	1973	King Curtis & Champion Jack Dupree	Blues at Montreux	
1638	1972	David Newman	The Weapon	
1639	1972	Art Ensemble of Chicago	Bap-Tizum	
1640	1972	Rahsaan Roland Kirk	Prepare Thyself to Deal With a Miracle	
1641	1973	Dave Brubeck, Gerry Mulligan and Paul Desmond	We're All Together Again for the First Time	
1642	1973	Herbie Mann	Turtle Bay	
1643	1973	Gil Evans	Svengali	
1644	1973	Robin Kenyatta	Terra Nova	
1645	1973	Dave Brubeck	Two Generations of Brubeck	
1646	1974	Les McCann	Layers	
1647	1974	Eddie Harris	E.H. in the U.K.	
1648	1974	Herbie Mann	London Underground	
1649	1974	Oscar Brown, Jr.	Brother, Where Are You?	
1650	1974	Yusef Lateef	Part of the Search	
1651	1974	Art Ensemble of Chicago	Fanfare for the Warriors	
1652	1974	The Modern Jazz Quartet	Blues on Bach	
1653	1974	Charles Mingus	Mingus Moves	
1654	1973	Andy Bey	Experience and Judgment	
1655	1974	Herbie Mann	Reggae	
1656	1974	Robin Kenyatta	Stompin' at the Savoy	
1657	1974	Harold Alexander	Raw Root	
1658	1974	The Family of Mann	First Light	
1659	1974	Eddie Harris	Is It In	
1660	1974	Dave Brubeck	Brother, The Great Spirit Made Us All	
1661	1974	Arif Mardin	Journey	
1662	1974	David Newman	Newmanism	
1663	1974	Pat Rebillot	Free Fall	
1664	1974	Bobby Short	The Mad Twenties	
1665	1974	Duke Ellington	Recollections of the Big Band Era	
1666	1974	Les McCann	Another Beginning	
1667	1974	Charles Mingus	Mingus at Carnegie Hall	
1668	1975	John Coltrane	Alternate Takes	
1669	1975	Eddie Harris	I Need Some Money	
1670	1975	Herbie Mann	Discothèque	
1671	1975	Dick Hyman with The New York Jazz Repertory Company	Satchmo Remembered: The Music of Louis Armstrong at Carnegie Hall	
1672	1975	Phineas Newborn, Jr.	Solo Piano	
1673	1975	Keith Jarrett	El Juicio (The Judgement)	
1674	1975	Rahsaan Roland Kirk	The Case of the 3 Sided Dream in Audio Color	
1675	1975	Eddie Harris	Bad Luck Is All I Have	
1676	1975	Herbie Mann	Waterbed	
1677	1975	Charles Mingus	Changes One	
1678	1975	Charles Mingus	Changes Two	
1679	1975	Les McCann	Hustle to Survive	
1680	1975	Esther Phillips	Confessin' the Blues	
1681	1976	Herb Geller	Rhyme and Reason	
1682	1976	Herbie Mann	Surprises	Featuring Cissy Houston
1683	1976	Eddie Harris	That Is Why You're Overweight	
1684	1976	Dave Brubeck	All The Things We Are	With Anthony Braxton, Alan Dawson, Roy Haynes, Lee Konitz and Jack Six
1685	1976	Yusef Lateef	The Doctor Is In... and Out	
1686	1976	Rahsaan Roland Kirk	Other Folks' Music	
1687	1976	Freddie Hubbard	Echoes of Blue	Compilation of tracks from the albums Backlash and High Blues Pressure.
1688	1977	Duke Ellington	Duke Ellington's Jazz Violin Session	With Svend Asmussen, Stephane Grappelli and Ray Nance
1689	1977	Bobby Short	My Personal Property	
1690	1976	Les McCann	River High, River Low	
1691	1976	Mose Allison	Your Mind Is on Vacation	
1692	1976	Roy Ayers	Daddy Bug & Friends	
1693	1976	Peter Herbolzheimer	Jazz Gala Concert	
1694	1976	Joe Zawinul	Concerto Retitled	Compilation of tracks from The Rise and Fall of the Third Stream, Zawinul and Money in the Pocket
1695	1976	Joachim Kühn	Springfever	
1696	1977	Chick Corea/Herbie Hancock/Keith Jarrett/McCoy Tyner	Chick Corea – Herbie Hancock – Keith Jarrett – McCoy Tyner	
1697	N/A	Unissued	Unissued	Unissued
1698	1977	Eddie Harris	How Can You Live Like That?	
1699	1977	Don Pullen	Tomorrow's Promises	
1700	1977	Charles Mingus	Three or Four Shades of Blues	

=== 8800 series ===
Catalog number	Year	Artist	Title	Notes
8800	1978	Jay McShann	The Last of the Blue Devils	
8801	1978	Charles Mingus	Cumbia & Jazz Fusion	
8802	1978	Don Pullen	Montreux Concert	
8803	1979	Charles Mingus	Me, Myself an Eye	
8804	1979	Jay McShann	The Big Apple Bash	
8805	1980	Charles Mingus	Something Like a Bird	
8806	1981	The Modern Jazz Quartet	More from the Last Concert	
8807	1982	Eddie Harris	The Versatile Eddie Harris	
8808	1982	Keith Jarrett	Somewhere Before	live at Shelley Manne-Hole; reissue of 1969 Vortex release
8809	1981	Charles Mingus	Pithecanthropus Erectus	reissue of 1237 (1956)
8810	1982	Ornette Coleman	Twins	reissue of 1588 (1971)
8811	1982	Milt Jackson	Plenty, Plenty Soul	reissue of 1269 (1957)
8812	1982	Joe Turner	The Boss of the Blues	reissue of 1234 (1956)
8813	1981	Hubert Laws	The Laws of Jazz	reissue of 1432 (1964)

=== 3000 series ===
A small run of eight jazz LPs released between 1965 and 1967.

Catalog	Year	Artist	Title	Notes
3001	1965	Rufus Harley	Bagpipe Blues	
3002	1966	Duke Pearson Nonet	Honeybuns	
3003	1966	Valerie Capers	Portrait in Soul	
3004	1966	Joe Zawinul	Money in the Pocket	
3005	1966	Duke Pearson	Prairie Dog	
3006	1966	Rufus Harley	Scotch & Soul	
3007	1967	Roland Kirk	Here Comes the Whistleman	
3008	1967	Sonny Stitt	Deuces Wild	

=== 8000 "Popular" Series ===
Atlantic commenced releasing 12-inch LPs of popular music in 1956 with the 8000 Series collections of hit singles by their roster of established rhythm and blues artists. The 1960s saw the expansion of Atlantic's roster with the addition of popular music performers, international artists and the emerging dominance of soul music singers such as Solomon Burke and Aretha Franklin. By the end of the 1960s the label experienced its greatest commercial success breaking rock music supergroups like Led Zeppelin and Crosby, Stills & Nash.

Catalog	Artist	Album	Notes
8001	Various Artists	The Greatest Rock & Roll	Featuring LaVern Baker, Ruth Brown, Ray Charles, The Clovers, The Drifters, Ivory Joe Hunter, Clyde McPhatter, Joe Turner and Chuck Willis
8002	LaVern Baker	LaVern	
8003	Clyde McPhatter and The Drifters	Clyde McPhatter and The Drifters	Rock & Roll Series
8004	Ruth Brown	Ruth Brown	Rock & Roll Series
8005	Joe Turner	Joe Turner	Rock & Roll Series
8006	Ray Charles	Ray Charles	Rock & Roll Series
8007	LaVern Baker	LaVern Baker	Rock & Roll Series
8008	Ivory Joe Hunter	Ivory Joe Hunter	Rock & Roll Series
8009	The Clovers	The Clovers	
8010	Various Artists	Rock & Roll Forever	Featuring Joe Turner, LaVern Baker, The Clovers, Clyde McPhatter & The Drifters, Ray Charles, Ruth Brown and T-Bone Walker
8011	Ray Ventura and His Orchestra	Hi-Fi Sounds for Young Parisians	
8012	Mac-Kac	Mac-Kac & His French Rock & Roll	
8013	Various Artists	Dance the Rock & Roll	Featuring Willis Jackson, Chuck Calhoun, Tommy Ridgley, Arnett Cobb, Joe Morris, Frank Culley and Tiny Grimes
8014	Chris Connor	I Miss You So	
8015	Ivory Joe Hunter	Ivory Joe Sings the Old and the New	
8016	Cy Walter	Cy Walter Plays Gershwin Classics	
8017	Betty Johnson	Betty Johnson	
8018	Chuck Willis	The King of the Stroll	
8019	Champion Jack Dupree	Blues from the Gutter	
8020	T-Bone Walker	T-Bone Blues	
8021	Various Artists	Rock & Roll Forever Vol II	Featuring Chuck Willis, Ray Charles, The Bobbettes, Joe Turner, LaVern Baker, Clyde McPhatter, Ruth Brown, Ivory Joe Hunter, The Clovers, The Drifters and The Jaye Sisters
8022	The Drifters	Rockin' & Driftin'	
8023	Joe Turner	Rockin' the Blues	
8024	Clyde McPhatter	Love Ballads	
8025	Ray Charles	Yes Indeed!	
8026	Ruth Brown	Miss Rhythm	
8027	Betty Johnson	The Song You Heard When You Fell In Love	
8028	Luiz Bonfá	¡Amor!: The Fabulous Guitar of Luiz Bonfa	
8029	Ray Charles	What'd I Say	
8030	LaVern Baker	Blues Ballads	
8031	Clyde McPhatter	Clyde	
8032	Chris Connor	Witchcraft	
8033	Joe Turner	Big Joe is Here	
8034	The Clovers	The Clovers' Dance Party	
8035	Mickey Baker	The Wildest Guitar	
8036	LaVern Baker	Precious Memories: LaVern Baker Sings Gospel	
8037	Various Artists	The Rocking 50s	Featuring LaVern Baker, The Bobettes, Ruth Brown, Ray Charles, The Clovers, The Drifters, Ivory Joe Hunter, Clyde McPhatter, Joe Turner and Chuck Willis
8038	Lonnie Donegan	Skiffle Folk Music	
8039	Ray Charles	Ray Charles in Person	
8040	Chris Connor	Chris in Person	
8041	The Drifters	The Drifters' Greatest Hits	
8042	The Tarriers	Tell the World About This	
8043	The Zeniths	Makin' the Scene	
8044	Raymond Lefèvre and His Continental Dance Orchestra	Romantica	
8045	Champion Jack Dupree	Natural & Soulful Blues	
8046	Chris Connor	A Portrait of Chris	
8047	The Leiber-Stoller Big Band	Yakety Yak	
8048	Diahann Carroll	Fun Life	
8049	Chris Connor and Maynard Ferguson	Double Exposure	
8050	LaVern Baker	Saved	
8051	Will Holt and Dolly Jonah	On the Brink	
8052	Ray Charles	The Genius Sings the Blues	
8053	Robert Clary	Robert Clary Lives It Up at the Playboy Club	
8054	Ray Charles	Do the Twist! with Ray Charles	
8055	The Mar-Keys	Last Night!	
8056	Champion Jack Dupree	Champion of the Blues	
8057	Carla Thomas	Gee Whiz	
8058	Various Artists	The Greatest Twist Hits	Featuring LaVern Baker, The Bobettes, Solomon Burke, Ray Charles, The Clovers, King Coleman, King Curtis, The Mar-Keys, Clyde McPhatter, Tommy Ridgley, Lloyd Sims, The Top Notes, Tee Tucker and Big Joe Turner
8059	The Drifters	Save the Last Dance for Me	
8060	Carl Holmes & His Commanders	Twist Party at the Roundtable	
8061	Chris Connor	Free Spirits	
8062:	The Mar-Keys	Do the Pop-Eye with the Mar-Keys	
8063	Ray Charles	The Ray Charles Story Volume One	
8064	Ray Charles	The Ray Charles Story Volume Two	
8065	Various Artists	The Solid Gold Groups	
8066	Mel Tormé	Mel Tormé at the Red Hill	
8067	Solomon Burke	Solomon Burke's Greatest Hits	
8068	Various Artists	Hound Dog's Old Gold	
8069	Mel Tormé	Comin' Home Baby!	
8070	João Gilberto	The Boss of the Bossa Nova	US release of João Gilberto (Odeon, 1961)
8071	LaVern Baker	See See Rider	
8072	Shel Silverstein	Inside Folk Songs	
8073	The Drifters	Up on the Roof: The Best of the Drifters	
8074	Martin Adam Wilson	He's In Charge Here!	
8075	Nancy Harrow	You Never Know	
8076	João Gilberto	The Warm World of Joao Gilberto	US release of Chega de Saudade (Odeon, 1959)
8077	Clyde McPhatter	The Best of Clyde McPhatter	
8078	LaVern Baker	The Best of LaVern Baker	
8079	Chuck Willis	I Remember Chuck Willis	
8080	Ruth Brown	The Best of Ruth Brown	
8081	Joe Turner	The Best of Joe Turner	
8082	Chris Connor	The Best of Chris Connor	
8083	Ray Charles	The Ray Charles Story Vol. 3	
8084	The Shadows	Out of the Shadows	US release of UK LP (Columbia, 1962)
8085	Solomon Burke	If You Need Me	
8086	Barbara Lewis	Hello Stranger	
8087	The New World Singers	The New World Singers	
8088	Doris Troy	Doris Troy Sings Just One Look	
8089	The Shadows	Surfin' with the Shadows	
8090	Barbara Lewis	Snap Your Fingers	Subtitled Barbara Lewis Sings the Great Soul Tunes
8091	Mel Tormé	Mel Tormé Sings Sunday in New York	
8092	Anamari	Anamari	
8093	The Drifters	Our Biggest Hits	Discontinued after a very short time in favor of 8099
8094	Ray Charles	The Ray Charles Story Volume 4	
8095	General Douglas MacArthur	The Complete Life of General Douglas MacArthur Through His Own Words	
8096	Solomon Burke	Rock 'n' Soul	
8097	The Shadows	The Shadows Know!!!	
8098	Various Artists	Jamaica Ska	Featuring Byron Lee & the Ska Kings, The Blues Busters, The Charmers, Stranger, Ken & Patsy and The Maytals
8099	The Drifters	Under the Boardwalk	
8100	Various Artists	Porky's Golden Dusties	Featuring The Robins, The Penguins, The Falcons, The Nite Caps, The Aladdins, The Avalons, The Superiors, Jimmy McHugh, Tony March, The Coasters, The Swingin' Hearts, Larry Dale, The Caps, The Versatones, The Clovers, The Royaltones, Clyde McPhatter, Ronnie Jones & The Classmates, The Dubs and The Blonde Bomber
8101	Various Artists	Saturday Night at the Uptown	Live album recorded at The Uptown Theatre in Philadelphia featuring The Drifters, Wilson Pickett, The Vibrations, Patty & the Emblems, The Carltons, Barbara Lynn and Patti LaBelle & Her Bluebells
8102	Esther Phillips	And I Love Him!	
8103	The Drifters	The Good Life with the Drifters	
8104	Don Covay	Mercy!	
8105	Herbie Mann & João Gilberto	Herbie Mann & Joao Gilberto with Antonio Carlos Jobim	
8106	Joe Tex	Hold On To What You've Got	
8107	Austin Cromer	Austin Cromer Sings for Her	
8108	Killer Joe Piro	Killer Joe's International Discothèque	
8109	Solomon Burke	The Best of Solomon Burke	
8110	Barbara Lewis	Baby, I'm Yours	
8111	Walter Chiles and Clarence Pettiford	Chiles & Pettiford Live at Jilly's	
8112	Sérgio Mendes and Brasil '65	In Person at El Matador	
8113	The Drifters	Where The Music's Playing	
8114	Wilson Pickett	In the Midnight Hour	
8115	Joe Tex	The New Boss	
8116	Various Artists	Solid Gold Soul	Featuring Solomon Burke, Don Covay, Ben E. King, Wilson Pickett, Otis Redding and Joe Tex
8117	Chris Kenner	Land of 1000 Dances	
8118	Barbara Lewis	It's Magic	
8119	Patti LaBelle and The Bluebelles	Over the Rainbow	
8120	Don Covay	See-Saw	
8121	Bobby Darin	Bobby Darin Sings The Shadow of Your Smile	
8122	Esther Phillips	Esther Phillips Sings	
8123	The Young Rascals	The Young Rascals	
8124	Joe Tex	The Love You Save	
8125	Percy Sledge	When a Man Loves a Woman	
8126	Bobby Darin	In a Broadway Bag	
8127	Mireille Mathieu	Fabulous New French Singing Star	
8128	Leslie Uggams	A Time to Love	
8129	Wilson Pickett	The Exciting Wilson Pickett	
8130	Esther Phillips	The Country Side of Esther Phillips	
8131	Not released		
8132	Percy Sledge	Warm and Tender Soul	
8133	Joe Tex	I've Got to Do a Little Bit Better	
8134	The Young Rascals	Collections	
8135	Bobby Darin	If I Were a Carpenter	
8136	Eddie Higgins	The Piano of Eddie Higgins	
8137	Various Artists	Solid Gold Soul Volume 2	Featuring Solomon Burke, Ray Charles, Chris Kenner, Wilson Pickett, Percy Sledge and Joe Tex
8138	Wilson Pickett	The Wicket Pickett	
8139	Aretha Franklin	I Never Loved a Man the Way I Love You	
8140	Various Artists	Beach Beat	Featuring The Clovers, The Coasters, The Drifters, Barbara Lewis, Stick McGhee, Clyde McPhatter, Willie Tee, Doris Troy and Chuck Willis
8141	Herbie Mann & Tamiko Jones	A Mann & A Woman	
8142	Bobby Darin	Inside Out	
8143	Carmen McRae	For Once in My Life	
8144	Joe Tex	The Best of Joe Tex	
8145	Wilson Pickett	The Sound of Wilson Pickett	
8146	Percy Sledge	The Percy Sledge Way	
8147	Patti LaBelle & The Bluebelles	Dreamer	
8148	The Young Rascals	Groovin'	
8149	Flip Wilson	Cowboys & Colored People	
8150	Aretha Franklin	Aretha Arrives	
8151	Wilson Pickett	The Best of Wilson Pickett	
8152	John Hammond	I Can Tell	
8153	The Drifters	The Drifters' Golden Hits	
8154	Bobby Darin	Bobby Darin Sings Doctor Dolittle	
8155	The Sweet Inspirations	The Sweet Inspirations	
8156	Joe Tex	Live and Lively	
8157	Shelly Manne	Daktari	
8158	Solomon Burke	King Solomon	
8159	Kenny Solms & Gail Parent	Here Comes the Bird	
8160	Mireille Mathieu	Made in France	
8161	Various Artists	History of Rhythm & Blues Volume 1: The Roots 1947–52	Featuring Ruth Brown, The Cardinals, The Clovers, Frank Culley, The Delta Rhythm Boys, Lead Belly, Stick McGhee, Edna McGriff, The Orioles, The Ravens, Laurie Tate & Joe Morris Orchestra and Joe Turner
8162	Various Artists	History of Rhythm & Blues Volume 2: The Golden Years 1953–55	Featuring LaVern Baker, Ruth Brown, Ray Charles, The Chords, The Clovers, The Diamonds, The Drifters featuring Clyde McPhatter, The Five Keys, Tommy Ridgeley and Joe Turner
8163	Various Artists	History of Rhythm & Blues Volume 3: Rock & Roll 1956–57	Featuring The Robins, The Clovers, Joe Turner, The Drifters, Clyde McPhatter, Ivory Joe Hunter, LaVern Baker, The Coasters and Chuck Willis
8164	Various Artists	History of Rhythm & Blues Volume 4: The Big Beat 1958–60	Featuring LaVern Baker, Ray Charles, The Coasters, Bobby Darin, The Drifters, Ben E. King, Clyde McPhatter and Carla Thomas
8165	Carmen McRae	Portrait of Carmen	
8166	Charlie Palmieri	Latin Bugalu	
8167	Various Artists	Brazil's Super Hits	Featuring Luiz Bonfa, João Gilberto, Herbie Mann, Sergio Mendes, The Modern Jazz Quartet with Laurindo Almeida, and Baden Powell
8169	The Rascals	Once Upon a Dream	
8170	Various Artists	This Is Soul	Featuring Solomon Burke, Arthur Conley, Eddie Floyd, Aretha Franklin, Ben E. King, Wilson Pickett, Otis Redding, Sam & Dave, Percy Sledge and Carla Thomas
8171	Barbara Lynn	Here Is Barbara Lynn	
8172	Earl Coleman	Love Songs	featuring Billy Taylor
8173	Barbara Lewis	Workin' on a Groovy Thing	
8174	Billy Vera & Judy Clay	Storybook Children	
8175	Wilson Pickett	I'm in Love	
8176	Aretha Franklin	Lady Soul	
8177	Sérgio Mendes	Sérgio Mendes' Favorite Things	
8178	Bob Booker and George Foster	The Handwriting on the Wall	Subtitled The Sounds of Graffiti
8179	Flip Wilson	You Devil You	
8180	Percy Sledge	Take Time to Know Her	
8181	Archie Bell	Tighten Up	
8182	The Sweet Inspirations	Songs of Faith & Inspiration	Credited to Cissy Drinkard & The Sweet Inspirations
8183	Wilson Pickett	The Midnight Mover	
8184	Mandala	Soul Crusade	
8185	Solomon Burke	I Wish I Knew	
8186	Aretha Franklin	Aretha Now	
8187	Joe Tex	Soul Country	
8188	Various Artists	The Super Hits Vol. 2	Featuring The Bar-Kays, Bee Gees, Buffalo Springfield, Don Covay, The Fireballs, Aretha Franklin, Wilson Pickett, The Rascals, Otis Redding, Sam & Dave, Sonny & Cher and Joe Tex
8189	Apple Pie Motherhood Band	The Apple Pie Motherhood Band	
8190	The Rascals	Time Peace: The Rascals' Greatest Hits	
8191	Various Artists	Beach Beat Vol. 2	Featuring Bobby Moore & the Rhythm Aces, Tony Clarke, The Clovers, The Coasters, King Curtis & The Kingpins, Ben E. King, Barbara Lewis, Clyde McPhatter, Lenny O'Henry, Billy Stewart, Willie Tee and Maurice Williams and the Zodiacs
8192	Clarence Carter	This Is Clarence Carter	
8193	Various Artists	History of Rhythm & Blues Volume 5: The Beat Goes On 1961–62	Featuring LaVern Baker, William Bell, Booker T. & the M.G.'s, Solomon Burke, Ray Charles, The Coasters, The Drifters, The Falcons featuring Wilson Pickett, The Ikettes, Ben E. King, The Mar-Keys, Otis Redding and Rufus Thomas
8194	Various Artists	History of Rhythm & Blues Volume 6: On Broadway 1963–64	Featuring Solomon Burke, The Coasters, Don Covay, The Drifters, Nat Kendrick & The Swans, Chris Kenner, Ben E. King, Barbara Lewis, Wilson Pickett, Otis Redding, Joe Tex, Carla Thomas, Rufus Thomas and Doris Troy
8195	The Robert Stigwood Orchestra	The Robert Stigwood Orchestra Plays Bee Gees' Hits	
8196	Leslie Uggams	What Is an Uggams?	
8197	Billy Vera	With Pen in Hand	
8198	The Crazy World of Arthur Brown	The Crazy World of Arthur Brown	US release of UK album
8199	Clarence Carter	The Dynamic Clarence Carter	
8200	Carmen McRae	The Sound of Silence	
8201	The Sweet Inspirations	What the World Needs Now Is Love	
8202	Booker T. & the M.G.'s	The Best of Booker T. and the MG's	
8203	Various Artists	The Super Hits Vol. 3	Featuring Archie Bell & the Drells, Booker T. & the MG's, Arthur Conley, Cream, Aretha Franklin, Wilson Pickett, The Rascals, Sam & Dave, Percy Sledge, The Sweet Inspirations and Vanilla Fudge
8204	Archie Bell & the Drells	I Can't Stop Dancing	
8205	Sam & Dave	I Thank You	
8206	John Hammond	Sooner or Later	
8207	Aretha Franklin	Aretha in Paris	
8208	Various Artists	History of Rhythm & Blues Volume 7: The Sound of Soul 1965–66	Featuring Solomon Burke, The Capitols, Don Covay & The Goodtimers, Eddie Floyd, Barbara Lewis, Wilson Pickett, Otis Redding, Sam & Dave, Percy Sledge and Willie Tee
8209	Various Artists	History of Rhythm & Blues Volume 8: The Memphis Sound 1967	Featuring The Bar-Kays, Booker T. & the MG's, Arthur Conley, King Curtis, Aretha Franklin, Wilson Pickett, Otis Redding, Sam & Dave, Percy Sledge, Joe Tex and Carla Thomas
8210	Percy Sledge	The Best of Percy Sledge	
8211	Joe Tex	Happy Soul	
8212	Aretha Franklin	Soul '69	
8213	Albert King	King of the Blues Guitar	
8214	Dusty Springfield	Dusty in Memphis	
8215	Wilson Pickett	Hey Jude	
8216	Led Zeppelin	Led Zeppelin	
8217	The Magic Lanterns	Shame Shame	
8218	Sam & Dave	The Best of Sam & Dave	
8219	Cartoone	Cartoone	
8220	Black Pearl	Black Pearl	
8221	Ars Nova	Sunshine and Shadows	
8222	Arif Mardin	Glass Onion	
8223	Lotti Golden	Motor-Cycle	
8224	Various Artists	The Super Hits Vol. 4	Featuring Bee Gees, Archie Bell & The Drells, Arthur Brown, Clarence Carter, Cream, Tyrone Davis, Aretha Franklin, Wilson Pickett, The Rascals and Dusty Springfield
8225	The Sweet Inspirations	Sweets for My Sweet	
8226	Archie Bell & the Drells	There's Gonna Be a Showdown	
8227	Aretha Franklin	Aretha's Gold	
8228	Marion Williams	The New Message	
8229	Crosby, Stills & Nash	Crosby, Stills & Nash	
8230	Roberta Flack	First Take	
8231	Joe Tex	Buying a Book	
8232	Carla Thomas	The Best of Carla Thomas	
8233	Apple Pie Motherhood Band	Apple Pie	
8234	Rune Gustafsson	Rune at the Top	
8235	Barney Kessel	Hair is Beautiful	
8236	Led Zeppelin	Led Zeppelin II	
8237	Don Covay & the Jefferson Lemon Blues Band	The House of Blue Lights	
8238	Clarence Carter	Testifin'	
8239	Boz Scaggs	Boz Scaggs	
8240	Banchee	Banchee	
8241	Leslie Uggams	Just to Satisfy You	
8242	Jimmy Scott	The Source	
8243	Yes	Yes	
8244	Golden Earring	Eight Miles High	
8245	King Crimson	In the Court of the Crimson King	
8246	The Rascals	See	
8247	MC5	Back in the USA	
8248	Aretha Franklin	This Girl's in Love with You	
8249	Dusty Springfield	A Brand New Me	
8250	Wilson Pickett	Right On	
8251	John Hammond	Southern Fried	
8252	Mongo Santamaria	Feelin' Alright	
8253	The Sweet Inspirations	Sweet, Sweet Soul	
8254	Joe Tex	Joe Tex Sings with Strings & Things	
8255	Champion Jack Dupree	Blues from the Gutter	Reissue of 8019
8256	T-Bone Walker	T-Bone Blues	Reissue of 8020
8257	Shel Silverstein	Inside Shel Silverstein	Reissue of 8072
8258	Mott the Hoople	Mott the Hoople	
8259	Eugene McDaniels	Outlaw	
8260	Loudon Wainwright III	Loudon Wainwright III	
8261	Side Show	Side Show	
8262	The Assembled Multitude	The Assembled Multitude	
8263	Tamalpais Exchange	Tamalpais Exchange	
8264	Thunderclap Newman	Hollywood Dream	
8265	Aretha Franklin	Spirit in the Dark	
8266	King Crimson	In the Wake of Poseidon	
8267	Clarence Carter	Patches	
8268	Dick Holler	Someday Soon	
8269	Jo Mama	Jo Mama	
8270	Wilson Pickett	Wilson Pickett In Philadelphia	
8271	Sam Samudio	Sam, Hard and Heavy	
8272	Mott the Hoople	Mad Shadows	
8273	Yes	Time and a Word	
8274	Various Artists	The Super Hits Volume 5	Featuring Brook Benton, Blues Image, Crosby, Stills, Nash & Young, Tyrone Davis, Aretha Franklin, R. B. Greaves, Led Zeppelin, Lulu, Nazz, Wilson Pickett, The Rascals and Thunderclap Newman
8275	The J. Geils Band	The J. Geils Band	
8276	The Rascals	Search and Nearness	
8277	Mitch Miller & the Gang	Peace Sing-Along	
8278	King Crimson	Lizard	
8279	Alamo	Alamo	
8280	Papa Nebo	Papa Nebo	
8281	Eugene McDaniels	Headless Heroes of the Apocalypse	
8282	Clarence Carter	The Best of Clarence Carter	
8283	Yes	The Yes Album	
8284	Mott the Hoople	Wildlife	
8285	MC5	High Time	
8286	Barbara Lewis	The Best of Barbara Lewis	
8287	Esther Williams	Unreleased album	later surfaced as extra tracks on the CD issue of Confessin' The Blues.
8288	Jo Mama	J is for Jump	
8289	Marion Williams	Standing Here Wondering Which Way	
8290	Wilson Pickett	The Best of Wilson Pickett, Volume 2	
8291	Loudon Wainwright III	Album II	
8292	Joe Tex	From the Roots Came the Rapper	
8293	Judee Sill	Judee Sill	Not released on Atlantic; this was instead issued as the first album released on Asylum Records.
8294	Charles John Quarto	Charles John Quarto	
8295	Aretha Franklin	Aretha's Greatest Hits	
8296	John Prine	John Prine	
8297	The J. Geils Band	The Morning After	
8298	Batdorf & Rodney	Off the Shelf	
8299	James Luther Dickinson	Dixie Fried	
8300	Wilson Pickett	Don't Knock My Love	
8301	Jimmy & Vella	Jimmy and Vella	
8302	Shanti	Shanti	
8303	Howard Tate	Howard Tate	
8304	Mott the Hoople	Brain Capers	
8305	Aretha Franklin	The Best of Aretha Franklin	

=== 7200–7311 ===
- SD-7200 – Déjà Vu – Crosby, Stills, Nash and Young [1970]
- SD-7201 – Led Zeppelin III – Led Zeppelin [1970]
- SD-7202 – Stephen Stills – Stephen Stills [1970]
- SD-7203 – If I Could Only Remember My Name – David Crosby [1971]
- SD-7204 – Songs For Beginners – Graham Nash [1971]
- SD-7205 – Live At Fillmore West – Aretha Franklin [1971]
- SD-7206 – Stephen Stills 2 – Stephen Stills [1971]
- SD-7207 – Soul To Soul – Various Artists [1971]
- SD-7208 – Led Zeppelin IV (Untitled) – Led Zeppelin [1971]
- SD-7209 – The Way to Become the Sensuous Woman By "J" – Tony Camillo [1971]
- SD-7210 – All In the Family (TV Soundtrack) – Carroll O'Connor and Others [1971]
- SD-7211 – Fragile – Yes [1971]
- SD-7212 – Islands – King Crimson [1972]
- SD-7213 – Young, Gifted and Black – Aretha Franklin [1972]
- LD-7214 – FM and AM – George Carlin [1972] The label on this album is Little David Records.
- SD-7215 – Good Ol' Boys – Harold Griffiths [1/72]
- SD-7216 – Roberta Flack and Donny Hathaway – Roberta Flack and Donny Hathaway [1972]
- SP 7217 – Softly Whispering I Love You – The English Congregation [1972] Issued with a Signpost label and a different prefix. This group is known in the UK as "The Congregation".
- SD-7218 – Rollin' Man – Bobby Lance [1972]
- SD-7219 – Take a Sad Song... – Godfrey Daniel [1972]
- SD-7220 – Graham Nash and David Crosby – Graham Nash and David Crosby [1972]
- SD-7221 – Donal Leace – Donal Leace [11/72]
- SD-7222 – David Elliot – David Elliot [10/72]
- SD-7223 – Neal Rosengarden – Neal Rosengarden [1972]
- SD-7224 – Atlanta Twelve String – Blind Willie McTell [1972]
- SD-7225 – New Orleans Piano – Professor Longhair [1972]
- SD-7226 – Texas Guitar: From Dallas To L.A. – Various Artists [1972]
- SD-7227 – Blues Piano: Chicago Plus – Various Artists [1972]
- SD-7228 – Detroit Guitar – John Lee Hooker [1972]
- SD-7229 – Chicago Piano, Volume One – Jimmy and Mama Yancey [1972]
- SD-7230 – Keyboard Tales – Michael Perlitch [1972]
- SD-7231 – Jackie – Jackie DeShannon [1972]
- SD-7232 – All In the Family Second Album (TV Soundtrack) – Carroll O'Connor and Others [1972]
- SD-7233 – Angelo – Angelo [1972]
- SD-7234 – Macondo – Macondo [1972]
- SD-7235 – The Ship Album – S.C.R.A. (Southern Contemporary Rock Assembly) [1972]
- SD-7236 – Ramatam – Ramatam [1972]
- SD-7237 – Black Heat – Black Heat [1972]
- SD-7238 – The Divine Miss M – Bette Midler [1972]
- SD-7239 – (Untitled) – Clyde McPhatter [unreleased]
- SD-7240 – Diamond In the Rough – John Prine [1972]
- SD-7241 – Full House – J. Geils Band [1972]
- SD-7242 – Whole Oats – Daryl Hall and John Oates [1972]
- SD-7243 – Good God – Good God [1972]
- SD-7244 – Close To the Edge – Yes [1972]
- SD-7245 – Margaret and Ann – Margaret & Ann [1972]
- SD-7246 – If You're Lonely – Eric Justin Kaz [12/72]
- SD-7247 – New Heavenly Blue – New Heavenly Blue [1972]
- SD-7248 – Margie Joseph – Margie Joseph [1972]
- SD-7249 – Laugh When You Like – Jerry Stiller and Anne Meara [1972]
- SD-7250 – Down the Road – Stephen Stills and Manassas [1973]
- SD-7251 – Cosmic Furnace – Roger Powell [2/73]
- SD-7252 – You're a Good Man Charlie Brown – TV Soundtrack [1972]
- SD-7253 – Garland Jefferys – Garland Jefferys [1973]
- SD-7254 – Doug Sahm and Band – Doug Sahm [1973]
- SD-7255 – Houses of the Holy – Led Zeppelin [1973]
- SD-7256 – Spinners – Spinners [1973]
- SD-7257 – First Rush – Chris Rush [4/73]
- SD-7258 – A View From Another Place – Wayne Davis [1973]
- SD-7259 – River – Terry Reid [1973]
- SD-7260 – Bloodshot – J. Geils Band [1973] First pressings were on crimson vinyl, later pressings on black vinyl.
- SD-7261 – In April Cae the Dawning of the Red Suns – Ramatam [1973]
- SD-7262 – Shotgun Willie – Willie Nelson [1973]
- SD-7263 – Larks' Tongues In Aspic – King Crimson [1973]
- SD-7264 – Breezy Stories – Danny O'Keefe [1973]
- SD-7265 – Hey Now Hey (The Other Side of the Sky) – Aretha Franklin [1973]
- SD-7266 – Just Thank Me – David Rogers [1973]
- SD-7267 – Soul Makossa – Manu Dibango [1973]
- SD-7268 – Spectrum – Billy Cobham [1973]
- SD-7269 – Abandoned Luncheonette – Daryl Hall and John Oates [1973]
- SD-7270 – Bette Midler – Bette Midler [11/73]
- SD-7271 – Killing Me Softly – Roberta Flack [8/73]
- SD-7272 – (Untitled) – Macondo [unreleased]
- SD-7273 – Room To Grow – Barnaby Bye [1973]
- SD-7274 – Sweet Revenge – John Prine [1973]
- SD-7275 – Troublemaker – Willie Nelson [3/74]
- SD-7276 – Makossa Man – Manu Dibango [1974]
- SD-7277 – Sweet Surrender – Margie Joseph [1974]
- SD-7278 – Ms. Brown – Marti Brown [1974]
- SD-7279 – This Is Henson Cargill Country – Henson Cargill [1973]
- SD-7280 – On His Way – Don Adams [1973]
- SD-7281 – Now Presenting – Troy Seals [1973]
- SD-7282 – Anybody Seen My Sweet Gypsy Rose – Terry Stafford [1973] This album contains the original recording of "Amarillo by Morning," which later was a huge country hit by George Strait.
- SD-7283 – Farewell To the Ryman – David Rogers [1974]
- SD-7284 – Best of Crosby, Stills, Nash and Young – Crosby, Stills, Nash and Young [Unissued?]
- SD-7285 – Sweet Charlie Babe – Jackie Moore [1974]
- SD-7286 – Ladies Invited – J. Geils Band [11/73]
- SD-7287 – Texas Tornado – Sir Douglas Band [12/73]
- SD-7288 – Wild Tales – Graham Nash [1973]
- SD-7289 – One More River To Cross – Canned Heat [12/73]
- SD-7290 – Cul-De-Sac – Eric Kaz [3/74]
- SD-7291 – Phases and Stages – Willie Nelson [1974]
- SD-7292 – Let Me In Your Life – Aretha Franklin [1974]
- SD-7293 – Queen of the Night – Maggie Bell [1974]
- SD-7294 – No Time To Burn – Black Heat [1974]
- SD-7295 – What the....You Mean I Can't Sing?! – Melvin Van Peebles [1974]
- SD-7296 – Mighty Love – Spinners [1974]
- SD-7297 – Rock and Roll Queen – Mott the Hoople [1974]
- SD-7298 – Starless and Bible Black – King Crimson [1974]
- SD-7299 – Inner Spectrum – Ace Spectrum [1974]
- SD-7300 – Crosswinds – Billy Cobham [1974]
- SD-7301 – Road – Johnny Rivers [1974]
- SD-7302 – Blessed Assurance – Marion Williams [1974]
- SD-7303 – Your Baby Is a Lady – Jackie DeShannon [1974]
- SD-7304 – These Foolish Things – Bryan Ferry [1974]
- SD-7305 – The Everything Man – Jimmy Castor & Jimmy Castor Bunch [1974]
- SD-7306 – Hey There Girl – David Rogers [11/74]
- SD-7307 – Isaac Guillory – Isaac Guillory [1974]
- SD-7308 – AWB – Average White Band [1974]
- SD-7309 – Diane Steinberg – Diane Steinberg [1974]
- SD-7310 – Tracy Nelson – Tracy Nelson [1974]
- SD-7311 – Teasin' – Cornell Dupree [1974]

=== 18100-18232 "Popular" ===
- SD-18100 – So Far – Crosby, Stills, Nash and Young [1974]
- SD-18101 – Waterloo – ABBA [1974]
- SD-18102 – Captain Buckles – David "Fathead" Newman [1974]
- SD-18103 – Yesterdays – Yes [1975]
- SD-18104 – Touch – Barnaby Bye [1974]
- SD-18105 – We've Grown Close – Terry Stafford [unreleased]
- SD-18106 – Fresh – Oscar Brown Jr. [1975]
- SD-18107 – Nightmares... and Other Tales From the Vinyl Jungle – J. Geils Band [1974]
- SD-18108 – Let's Love – Peggy Lee [1974]
- SD-18109 – War Babies – Hall and Oates [1974]
- SD-18110 – Red – King Crimson [1974]
- SD-18111 – Hot City – Gene Page
- SD-18112 – The Band Kept Playing – Electric Flag [1975]
- SD-18113 – Another Time, Another Place – Bryan Ferry [11/74]
- SD-18114 – Roller Coaster Weekend – Joe Vitale [1975]
- SD-18115 – Wally – Wally [1974]
- SD-18116 – With Everything I Feel in Me – Aretha Franklin [1974]
- SD-18117 – Prone To Lean – Donnie Fritts [1974]
- SD-18118 – New and Improved – Spinners [1974]
- SD-18119 – My Way – Major Harris [1975]
- SD-18120 – The Prophet By Kahlil Gibran – Richard Harris [1975]
- SD-18121 – Total Eclipse – Billy Cobham [1974]
- SD-18122 – Relayer – Yes [1974]
- SD-18123 – Tonto's Expanding Head Band – Robert Margouleff and Malcolm Cecil [1974] This album is a reissue of Embryo SD-732.
- SD-18124 – Butt of Course – Jimmy Castor Bunch [1975]
- SD-18125 – So Long Harry Truman – Danny O'Keefe [1975]
- SD-18126 – Margie – Margie Joseph [1975]
- SD-18127 – Common Sense – John Prine [3/75]
- SD-18128 – Keep on Runnin' – Black Heat [1975]
- SD-18129 – Mel Tormé at the Maisonette – Mel Tormé [1975]
- SD-18130 – Welcome to My Nightmare – Alice Cooper [1975] Atlantic was the US distributor of this LP, which was released by Anchor Records in the UK.
- SD-18131 – Feel Like Makin' Love – Roberta Flack [1975]
- SD-18132 – Supernatural – Ben E. King [4/75]
- SD-18133 – The Manhattan Transfer – Manhattan Transfer [1975]
- SD-18134 – The Show Must Go On – Sam Dees [1975]
- SD-18135 – Vance 32 – Vance 32 (Kenny Vance) [1975]
- SD-18136 – USA – King Crimson [1975]
- SD-18137 – The Wiz (Original Cast) – Charles H. Coleman [1975]
- SD-18138 – Upon the Wings of Music – Jean-Luc Ponty [1975]
- SD-18139 – Shabazz – Billy Cobham [1975]
- SD-18140 – Cut the Cake – Average White Band [1975]
- SD-18141 – Pick of the Litter – Spinners [1975]
- SD-18142 – Prayer Changes Things – Marion Williams
- SD-18143 – Low Rent Rendezvous – Ace Spectrum
- SD-18144 – Mirabai – Mirabai [1975]
- SD-18145 – The Way We Were – Willis Jackson
- SD-18146 – ABBA [1975]
- SD-18147 – Hotline – J. Geils Band [1975]
- SD-18148 – Live – The Sensational Alex Harvey Band [1975]
- SD-18149 – A Funky Thide of Sings – Billy Cobham [1975]
- SD-18150 – Supersound – Jimmy Castor Bunch [1975]
- SD-18151 – You – Aretha Franklin [1975]
- TP/CS-18152 – Wind on the Water — Crosby & Nash [1975] Issued by Atlantic on the 8-track and cassette formats only; the vinyl album was issued on ABC ABCD-902.
- SD-18153 – Michel Polnareff [1976]
- SD-18154 – Beginnings – Steve Howe [1975]
- SD-18155 – Songs for the New Depression – Bette Midler [1975]
- SD-18156 – Stephen Stills Live [1975]
- SD-18157 – You Gotta Wash Your Ass – Redd Foxx [1975] The LP, which identifies no bands or tracks, was recorded live at the Apollo Theater in Harlem in 1975.
- SD-18158 – Disco-Trek – Various Artists [1976]
- SD-18159 – Fish Out of Water – Chris Squire [1975]
- SD-18160 – Jealousy – Major Harris [1976]
- SD-18161 – Lovelock – Gene Page [1976]
- SD-18162 – Doldinger Jubilee 75 – Passport [1976]
- SD-18163 – Aurora – Jean-Luc Ponty [1976]
- SD-18164 – Locked In – Wishbone Ash [1976]
- SD-18165 – The Reason Why I'm Talking S--t – Eddie Harris [5/76]
- SD-18166 – Life and Times – Billy Cobham [1976]
- SD-18167 – Ramshackled – Alan White [4/76]
- SD-18168 – Mike Douglas Sings It All – Mike Douglas [1976]
- SD-18169 – I Had a Love – Ben E. King [1976]
- SD-18170 – A Street Called Straight – Roy Buchanan [1976]
- SD-18171 – The Don Harrison Band [1976]
- SD-18172 – Where the Happy People Go – Trammps [1976]
- SD-18173 –
- SD-18174 – Firefall – Firefall [1976]
- SD-18175 – The Story Of I – Patrick Moraz [1976]
- SD-18176 – Sparkle (Soundtrack) – Aretha Franklin [1976]
- SD-18177 – Lovingly – Sylvia Syms [7/76]
- SD-18178 – Lipstick – Michel Polnareff [6/76]
- SD-18179 – Soul Searching – Average White Band [1976]
- SD-18180 – Olias of Sunhillow – Jon Anderson [1976]
- SD-18181 – Happiness Is Being With the Spinners The Spinners [1976]
- SD-18182 – Reggae II – Herbie Mann
- SD-18183 – Coming Out – Manhattan Transfer [1976]
- TP/CS-18184 – Whistling Down the Wire — Crosby & Nash [1976] Issued by Atlantic on the 8-track and cassette formats only; the vinyl album was issued on ABC ABCD-956.
- SD-18185 – Just Like in the Movies – Ace Spectrum [1976]
- SD-18186 – E-Man Groovin' – Jimmy Castor Bunch [1976]
- SD-18187 – Let's Stick Together – Bryan Ferry [1976]
- SD-18188 – Dee Dee Bridgewater – Dee Dee Bridgewater [1976]
- SD-18189 – Greatest Hits – ABBA [1976]
- SD-18190 – Photograph – Melanie [1976]
- SD-18191 – Rhapsody – Ben E. King [1976]
- SD-18192 – Songs For Evolution – Anglo-Saxon Brown [1976]
- SD-18193 – Ringo's Rotogravure – Ringo Starr [1976]
- SD-18194 – Live-On Tour In Europe – The Billy Cobham/George Duke Band [1976]
- SD-18195 – Imaginary Voyage – Jean-Luc Ponty [1976]
- SD-18196 – Frannie Golde – Frannie Golde [1976]
- SD-18197 – Bristol's Creme – Johnny Bristol [1976]
- SD-18198 – Golden Soul – Various Artists [1976]
- SD-18199 – Garden of Love Light – Narada Michael Walden [1977]
- SD-18200 – New England – Wishbone Ash [1976]
- SD-18201 – Still Stills: Best of Stephen Stills – Stephen Stills [1976]
- SD-18202 – Prime Prine: The Best of John Prine – John Prine [1976]
- SD-18203 – Laverne and Shirley Sing – Cindy Williams and Penny Marshall [1976]
- SD-18204 – Ten Years of Gold – Aretha Franklin [12/76]
- SD-18205 – L – Steve Hillage [1976]
- SD-18206 –
- SD-18207 – Arrival – ABBA [1976]
- SD-18208 – Red Hot – Don Harrison Band [1/77]
- SD-18209 – Bird in a Silver Cage – Herbie Mann [1976]
- SD-18210 – Eli – Jan Akkerman and Kaz Lux [1976]
- SD-18211 – Disco Inferno – Trammps [1976]
- SD-18212 – Mr. Flute – Art Webb [1976]
- SD-18213 – No Goodbyes – Hall and Oates [1977]
- SD-18214 – A Blow For Me-A Toot For You – Fred Wesley and Horny Horns [1977]
- SD-18215 – Foreigner [1977]
- SD-18216 – In Your Mind – Bryan Ferry [1977]
- SD-18217 – Hear & Now – Don Cherry [7/77]
- SD-18218 – El Mirage – Jimmy Webb [1977]
- SD-18219 – Loading Zone – Roy Buchanan [1977]
- SD-18220 – Back Together Again – Coryell & Mouzon [1977]
- SD-18221 – Jay Boy Adams [1977]
- SD-18222 –
- SD-18223 – Malombo – Malombo [1977]
- SD-18224 –
- SD-18225 – Serengeti Minstrel – Sonny Fortune [10/77]
- SD-18226 – Love Eyes – Art Webb [10/77]
- SD-18227 – Music from Other Galaxies and Planets – Don Ellis [1977]
- SD-18228 –
- SD-18229 –
- SD-18230 –
- SD-18231 – Pele (Soundtrack) – Sergio Mendes [1977]
- SD-18232 – Mark Farner [11/77]

=== 19100 "Popular" Series ===
Atlantic began this series mostly by reissuing its more popular titles.

- SD-19100 – Yesterday, Today and Tomorrow – Spinners [1977]
- SD-19101 – Luna Sea – Firefall [1977]
- SD-19102 – Sweet Passion – Aretha Franklin [1977]
- SD-19103 – Monkey Island – Geils [1977] Band name is Geils for this album only.
- SD-19104 – CSN – Crosby Stills and Nash [1977]
- SD-19105 – Benny and Us – Average White Band and Ben E. King [1977]
- SD-19106 – Going For the One – Yes [1977] This release uses a custom label.
- SD-19107 – I Love My Wife – Original Cast [1977] Produced by Cy Coleman. Cast includes Lenny Baker, Joanna Gleason, Ilene Graff, and James Naughton, with the band directed by John Miller.
- SD-19108 – Ringo the 4th – Ringo Starr [1977]
- SD-19109 – Foreigner [1977] Reissue of Atlantic SD-18215.
- SD-19110 – Enigmatic Ocean – Jean-Luc Ponty [1977]
- SD-19111 – Maximum Stimulation – Jimmy Castor Bunch [1977]
- SD-19112 – Herbie Mann & Fire Island – Herbie Mann [1977]
- SD-19113 – Playmates – Small Faces [8/77]
- SD-19114 – Greatest Hits – ABBA [1977] Reissue of Atlantic SD 18189.
- SD-19115 – Arrival – ABBA [1977] Reissue of Atlantic SD-18207.
- SD-19116 – Average White Band – Average White Band [1977] Reissue of Atlantic SD-7308.
- SD-19117 – Crosby Stills and Nash – Crosby Stills and Nash [1977] Reissue of Atlantic SD-8229.
- SD-19118 – Deja Vu – Crosby Stills and Nash [1977] Reissue of Atlantic SD-7200.
- SD-19119 – So Far – Crosby, Stills, Nash and Young [1977] Reissue of Atlantic SD- 18100.
- SD-19120 – Emerson Lake and Palmer [1977] Reissue of Cotillion SD-9040.
- SD-19121 – Tarkus – Emerson Lake and Palmer [1977] Reissue of Cotillion SD-9900.
- SD-19122 – Pictures At An Exhibition – Emerson Lake and Palmer [1977] Reissue of Cotillion ELP-66666.
- SD-19123 – Trilogy – Emerson Lake and Palmer [1977] Reissue of Cotillion SD-9903.
- SD-19124 – Brain Salad Surgery – Emerson Lake and Palmer [1977] Reissue of Manticore MS-66669.
- SD-19125 – Firefall – Firefall [1977] Reissue of Atlantic SD-18174.
- SD-19126 – Led Zeppelin – Led Zeppelin [1977] Reissue of Atlantic SD-8216.
- SD-19127 – Led Zeppelin II – Led Zeppelin [1977] Reissue of Atlantic SD-8236.
- SD-19128 – Led Zeppelin III – Led Zeppelin [1977] Reissue of Atlantic SD-7201.
- SD-19129 – 4 – Led Zeppelin [1977] Reissue of Atlantic SD-7208.
- SD-19130 – Houses of the Holy – Led Zeppelin [1977] Reissue of Atlantic SD-7255.
- SD-19131 – The Yes Album – Yes [1977] Reissue of Atlantic SD-8283.
- SD-19132 – Fragile – Yes [1977] Reissue of Atlantic SD-7211.
- SD-19133 – Close To the Edge – Yes [1977] Reissue of Atlantic SD-7244.
- SD-19134 – Yesterdays – Yes [1977] Reissue of Atlantic SD-18103.
- SD-19135 – Relayer – Yes [1977] Reissue of Atlantic SD-18122.
- SD-19136 – Imaginary Voyage – Jean Luc Ponty [1977] Reissue of SD-18195.
- SD-19137 –
- SD-19138 – Loading Zone – Roy Buchanan [1977] Reissue of Atlantic SD-18219.
- SD-19139 – Abandoned Luncheonette – Hall and Oates [1977] Reissue of Atlantic SD- 7269.
- SD-19140 – Eye of the Beholder – Ray Barretto [1977]
- SD-19141 – I Cry, I Smile – Narada Michael Walden [11/77]
- SD-19142 – True To Life – Ray Charles [1978]
- SD-19143 – Hear To Tempt You – Temptations [1977]
- SD-19144 – Motivation Radio – Steve Hillage [1978]
- SD-19145 – Love For Sale – Boney M [1978]
- SD-19146 – Spinners/8 – Spinners [1977]
- SD-19147 – Works, Volume 2 – Emerson Lake and Palmer [1977]
- SD-19148 – The Trammps III – Trammps [1977]
- SD-19149 – Blue Lights In the Basement – Roberta Flack [1977]
- SD-19150 – Crosby-Nash: Live – Crosby and Nash [1978] Possible reissue of ABC AA-1042.
- SD-19151 – Broken Blossom – Bette Midler [1977]
- SD-19152 – Leif Garrett – Leif Garrett [1977]
- SD-19153 – Chic – Chic [1977]
- SD-19154 – Killing Me Softly – Roberta Flack [1978] Reissue of Atlantic SD-7271.
- SD-19155 – In the Court of the Crimson King – King Crimson [1978] Reissue of Atlantic SD-8245.
- SD-19156 – John Prine – John Prine [1978] Reissue of Atlantic SD-8296.
- SD-19157 – Welcome To My Nightmare – Alice Cooper [1978] Reissue of Atlantic SD-18130.
- SD-19158 – Aurora – Jean-Luc Ponty [1978] Reissue of Atlantic SD-18163.
- SD-19159 – Jan Akkerman – Jan Akkerman [1978]
- SD-19160 – Make It Good – Prince Phillip Mitchell [3/78]
- SD-19161 – Almighty Fire – Aretha Franklin [1978]
- SD-19162 – Warmer Communications – Average White Band [1978]
- SD-19163 – Pastiche – Manhattan Transfer [1978]
- SD-19164 – The Album – ABBA [1978]
- SD-19165 – Fotomaker – Fotomaker [1978]
- SD-19166 – Boz Scaggs – Boz Scaggs [3/78] Reissue of Atlantic SD-8239.
- SD-19167 – Still Here – Ian Thomas Band [1978]
- SD-19168 – A Dance Fantasy Inspired by Close Encounters of the Third Kind – Vince Montana [1978]
- SD-19169 – Brazil: Once Again – Herbie Mann [1978]
- SD-19170 – You're Not Alone – Roy Buchanan [1978]
- SD-19171 – 78 In the Shade – Small Faces [10/78]
- SD-19172 – Richard Wagner – Richard Wagner [1978]
- SD-19173 – ...And Then There Were Three... – Genesis [1978]
- SD-19174 – Inner Conflicts – Billy Cobham [1978]
- SD-19175 – I Wasn't Born Yesterday – Allan Clarke [5/78]
- SD-19176 – Rings Around the Moon – Carillo [1978]
- SD-19177 – Sky Blue – Passport [1978]
- SD-19178 – Live At Montreux – Don Ellis [1978]
- SD-19179 – The Best of The Spinners – Spinners [1978]
- SD-19180 – Powerage – AC/DC [1978]
- SD-19181 – Peter Gabriel – Peter Gabriel [1978]
- SD-19182 – Feeling My Way – Margie Joseph [1978]
- SD-19183 – Elan – Firefall [1978]
- SD-19184 – Strangers – Johnny Bristol [1978]
- SD-19185 – Bamboo Magic – Chris Hinze [9/78]
- SD-19186 – Roberta Flack – Roberta Flack [1978]
- SD-19187 – Infinity Is – Sonny Fortune [1978]
- SD-19188 – Bare Back – Temptations [1978]
- SD-19189 – Cosmic Messenger – Jean-Luc Ponty [1978]
- SD-19190 – Memories Of The Future – Danny Toan [1978]
- SD-19191 – Badlands – Bill Chinnock [1978]
- SD-19192 –
- SD-19193 – Sunshower – Joachim Kuhn with Jan Akkerman [1978]
- SD-19194 – The Best of The Trammps – Trammps [1978]
- SD-19195 – Fork In the Road – Jay Boy Adams [9/78]
- SD-19196 – No Frills – Mark Farner Band [1979]
- SD-19197 – Vincent Montana Jr. Presents Goody Goody – Goody Goody [1978]
- SD-19198 – Can You Feel It – Ray Barretto [1978]
- SD-19199 – Love and Peace – Ray Charles [1979]
- SD-19200 – Let Me Live In Your Life – Ben E. King [9/78]
- SD-19201 – Funk Or Walk – Brides of Funkenstein [1978]
- SD-19202 – Tormato – Yes [1978]
- SD-19203 – The Best of David Crosby and Graham Nash – Crosby and Nash [1979] Possible reissue of ABC AA 1102.
- SD-19204 – Sunbelt – Herbie Mann [1979]
- SD-19205 – The Bride Stripped Bare – Bryan Ferry [1978]
- SD-19206 – Joe Brooks Group – Joe Brooks [12/78]
- SD-19207 – Feel No Fret – Average White Band [1979]
- SD-19208 – Vis a Vis – Fotomaker [1978]
- SD-19209 – C'est Chic – Chic [1979]
- SD-19210 – The Whole World's Dancing – Trammps [1979]
- SD-19211 – Love Beach – Emerson, Lake and Palmer [1978]
- SD-19212 – If You Want Blood You've Got It – AC/DC [1978]
- SD-19213 – Patrick Adams Presents – Phreek [1979]
- SD-19214 – Midnight Rhythm – Midnight Rhythm [2/79]
- SD-19215 – I Love Music – Vince Montana [1979]
- SD-19216 – Disco Extravaganza, Phase 1 – George Bussey [1979]
- SD-19217 – Briefcase Full of Blues – Blues Brothers [1978]
- SD-19218 – The Manhattan Transfer Live – The Manhattan Transfer [1979]
- SD-19219 – From Here to Eternally – Spinners [1979]
- SD-19220 – The Final Thing – Joe Fleming [1979]
- SD-19221 – Super Mann – Herbie Mann [1979]
- SD-19222 – Awakening – Narada Michael Walden [1979]
- SD-19223 – Midnight Rendezvous – Tasha Thomas [1979]
- SD-19224 – Come Down To Earth – Energetics [1979]
- HT-19225 – Magic Man – Broadway [5/79] This album is on the Hilltak label.
- HT-19226 – Choice – Gary Dalton & Kent Dubarri [1979] This album is on the Hilltak label.
- HT 19227 – All This For A Song – The Guess Who [1979] This album is on the Hilltak label.
- SD-19228 – Under Heaven Over Hell – Streetheart [1979]
- SD-19229 – Live – Jean-Luc Ponty [1979]
- SD-19230 – Perspective – Stefan Grossman [1979]
- SD-19231 – Top of the Line – Prince Phillip Mitchell [6/79]
- SD-19232 – Grey Ghost – Henry Paul Band [1979]
- SD-19233 – Garden of Eden – Passport [1979]
- SD-19234 – Best of The J. Geils Band – J. Geils Band [1979]
- SD-19235 – Street of Dreams – Carillo [1979]
- SD-19236 – Flee – The Jeremy Spencer Band [6/79]
- SD-19237 – I Love to Dance – Kleeer [6/79]
- SD-19238 – Best of Billy Cobham – Billy Cobham [1979]
- SD-19239 – With Sound Reason – Sonny Fortune [1979]
- SD-19240 – Fire on the Tracks – The Cate Bros. Band [1979]
- SD-19241 – Live – Jan Akkerman [6/79]
- SD-19242 – Fickle Heart – Sniff 'N' the Tears [1979]
- SD-19243 – The Steve Howe Album – Steve Howe [1979]
- SD-19244 – Highway To Hell – AC/DC [1979]
- SD-19245 – Music Man – Revanche [10/79]
- SD-19246 – Transfer Station – Fotomaker [1979]
- SD-19247 –
- SD-19248 – La Diva – Aretha Franklin [1979]
- SD-19249 – The Day the Earth Caught Fire – City Boy [1979]
- SD-19250 – Cerrone V-Angelina – Cerrone [11/79]
- SD-19251 – Ain't It So – Ray Charles [1979]
- SD-19252 – Yellow Fever – Herbie Mann [1980]
- SD-19253 – A Taste for Passion – Jean-Luc Ponty [1979]
- SD-19254 – Say Blow By Blow Backwards – Fred Wesley and Horny Horns [1979]
- SD-19255 – In Concert – Emerson Lake and Palmer [1979]
- SD-19256 – Dancin' and Lovin' – Spinners [1979]
- SD-19257 – Good to Me – THP [1979]
- SD-19258 – Extensions – Manhattan Transfer [1979]
- SD-19259 – The Dance Of Life – Narada Michael Walden [1979]
- SD-19260 – Therfu – Turley Richards [1980]
- SD-19261 – Never Buy Texas From a Cowboy – Brides of Funkenstein [1980]
- SD-19262 – Winners – Kleeer [1980]
- SD-19263 – On – Off Broadway usa [1980]
- SD-19264 –
- SD-19265 – Oceanliner – Passport [1980]
- SD-19266 – Volume VIII – Average White Band [1980]
- SD-19267 – Mixin' It Up – Trammps [1979]
- SD-19268 – Laurie and the Sighs – Laurie and the Sighs [5/80]
- SD-19269 – Music Trance – Ben E. King [1980]
- SD-19270 – Love Trippin' – Spinners [1980]
- SD-19271 – After the Roses – Kenny Rankin [1980]
- SD-19272 – The Game's Up – Sniff 'N' the Tears [1980]
- SD-19273 – Feel the Heat – Henry Paul Band [1980]
- SD-19274 – Broken Home – Broken Home [1980]
- SD-19275 – Stones – Dan Seals [1980]
- WTG19276 – Ready An' Willing – Whitesnake [1980]
- SD-19277 – Selling England By the Pound – Genesis [1980] Reissue of Charisma CAS 6060.
- SD-19278 – In Performance – Donny Hathaway [1980]
- SD-19279 – Victory – Narada Michael Walden [1980]
- WTG19280 – Rock 'N' Roll Outlaw – Rose Tattoo [1980]
- SD-19281 – Brother Ray Is At It Again! – Ray Charles [1980]
- SD-19282 – Hands in the Till – Fortress [1981]
- SD-19283 – The Best of Emerson Lake and Palmer – Emerson Lake and Palmer [1980]
- SD-19284 – Best of the J. Geils Band Two – J. Geils Band [11/80]
- SD-19285 – Heads Are Rolling – City Boy [1980]
- SD-19286 – Quick Turns – Off Broadway usa [11/80]
- SD-19287 – Free Fall – Alvin Lee Band [1980]
- SD-19288 – License To Dream – Kleeer [1981]
- SD-19289 – Branigan – Laura Branigan [1982]
- SD-19290 – Slipping Out – Trammps [1981]
- WTG19291 – House Of Music – T.S. Monk [1981] The label on this album is Mirage.
- WTG19292 – Live... In The Heart Of The City – Whitesnake [1980] The label on this two record set is Mirage.
- SD-19293 – Rocket 88 – Rocket 88 [1981]
- SD-19294 – Love Keys – Eddie Kendricks [8/81]
- SD-19295 – Warhead – More [1981]
- SD-19296 – Ullanda McCullough -Ullanda McCollough [1981]
- WTG19297 – Rock Away – Phoebe Snow [1981] The label on this album is Mirage.
- SD-19298 –
- SD-19299 – ZED [1981]
- SD-19300 – Street Tough – Ben E. King [4/81]
- SD-19301 – Miracles – Change [1981]
- SD-19302 – Iron Age – Mother's Finest [1981]
- SD-19303 – Stand Back – April Wine [1981] Reissue of Big Tree BT 89506.
- SD-19304 – Blue Tattoo – Passport [1981]
- RR-19305 – The Meadows – Meadows [1981] The label on this album is Radio Records.
- SD-19306 – RX5 – Alvin Lee [10/81]
- SD-19307 – Kix [1981]
- SD-19308 – Gwen McCrae – Gwen McCrae [1981]
- SD-19309 – Dr. Rhythm – M-Zee Band [1981]
- WTG19310 – Rage – Rage [1981] The label is Carrere/Mirage.
- SD-19311 – Coup De Grace – Mink DeVille [1981]
- WTG19312 – Assault And Battery – Rose Tattoo [1981] The label on this album is Mirage.
- SD-19313 – Abacab – Genesis [1981]
- RR 19314 – Stars On Long Play II – Stars On [1981]
- RY-19315 – Watts in a Tank – Diesel [1981] The label on this album is Regency.
- SD-19316 – The Best of Firefall – Firefall [1981]
- SD-19317 – The Best of Roberta Flack – Roberta Flack [1981]
- SD-19318 – Can't Shake This Feelin' – Spinners [1981]
- SD-19319 – The Best of The Manhattan Transfer [1981]
- SD-19320 – Classic Yes [1981] Includes a bonus 7" single.
- RR-19321 – The All Sports Band [1981] The label on this album is Radio Records.
- SD-19322 –
- SD-19323 – Take It Off – Chic [1981]
- WTG19324 – More Of The Good Life – T.S. Monk [1981]
- SD-19325 – Anytime – Henry Paul Band [1981]
- SD-19326 – A Place For My Stuff! – George Carlin [1981]
- WTG19327 – New York Cake – Kano [1981] The label on this album is Mirage.
- SD-19328 – Get On Up and Do It Again – Suzy Q [4/82]
- SD-19329 – For Those About To Rock (We Salute You) – AC/DC [1981] Used for a select group of international releases only; North American releases use the catalog number SD-11111.
- SD-19330 – This Must Be Heaven – Jerry Carr [1981] This is on the Cheri label.
- SD-19331 – Best of the Blues Brothers [1981]
- SD-19332 – The Visitors – ABBA [1981]
- SD-19333 – Mystical Adventures – Jean-Luc Ponty [1982]
- SD-19334 – Taste The Music – Kleeer [1982]
- RR-19335 – Growing In The Dark – Glass Moon [1982] The label on this album is Radio.
- SD-19336 – Harbinger – Dan Seals [1982]
- SD-19337 – Mondo Rock Chemistry – Mondo Rock [1982]
- SD-19338 – Adventures In Clubland – Modern Romance [1982]
- SD-19339 – Blood and Thunder – More [7/82]
- SD-19340 –
- WTG19341 – Snack Attack – Godley & Creme [1982] The label on this album is Mirage.
- SD-19342 – Sharing Your Love – Change [1982]
- SD-19343 – Voggue – Voggue [1982]
- SD-19344 – One To One – Carole King [1982]
- SD-19345 – Glorious Fool – John Martyn [1982]
- SD-19346 – Recorded Live – Otis Redding [1982]
- SD-19347 – Angst In My Pants – Sparks [1982]
- SD-19348 – Das Boot – Soundtrack [1982]
- RR-19349 – Stars On Long Play III – Stars On [1982] The label on this album is Radio.
- SD-19350 – Sippie Wallace – Sippie Wallace [1982]
- SD-19351 – Confidence – Narada Michael Walden [1982]
- SD-19352 –
- WTG19353 – Soup For One (Soundtrack) – Various Artists [1982] The label on this album is Mirage.
- SD-19354 – I'm the One – Roberta Flack [1981]
- SD-19355 – Animation – Jon Anderson [1982]
- RR-19356 – The Instructions [1982] The label on this album is Radio Records.
- WTG19357 – Exposed – Schneider with the Kick [1982] The label on this album is Mirage.
- SD-19358 – Face to Face – Gino Soccio [1982]
- SD-19359 –
- SD-19360 – Daylight Again – Crosby Stills and Nash [1982]
- SD-19361 – Ph.D – Ph.D [1982]
- SD-19362 –
- SD-19363 – Star Trek II: The Wrath of Khan (Soundtrack) – James Horner [1982]
- SD-19364 – Hot on the Clue -New York Express [1982]
- SD-19365 – Nugent – Ted Nugent [1982]

=== 16000 "Popular" Series ===
- SD-16000 – Voulez-Vous – ABBA [1979]
- SD-16001 – The Muppet Movie (Soundtrack) – Muppets [1979]
- SS-16002 – In Through the Out Door – Led Zeppelin [1979] The label on this album is Swan Song.
- SD-16003 – Risqué – Chic [1979]
- SD-16004 – Thighs and Whispers – Bette Midler [1979]
- SD-16005 –
- SD-16006 – Undertow – Firefall [1980]
- SD-16007 –
- SB-16008 – Same Goes For You – Leif Garrett [1979] The label on this album is Scotti Brothers.
- SD-16009 – Greatest Hits, Vol. 2 – ABBA [1979]
- SD-16010 – The Rose (Soundtrack) – Bette Midler [1979]
- SD-16011 – Les Plus Grands Succès De Chic: Chic's Greatest Hits – Chic [1979]
- SD-16012 – Love Somebody Today – Sister Sledge [1980] The label on this album is Cotillion.
- SD-16013 – Roberta Flack Featuring Donny Hathaway [1980]
- SD-16014 – Duke – Genesis [1980]
- COC16015 – Emotional Rescue – Rolling Stones [1980] The label on this album is Rolling Stones.
- SD-16016 – Real People – Chic [1980]
- SD-16017 – The Blues Brothers (Soundtrack) [1980]
- SD-16018 – Back In Black – AC/DC [1980]
- SD-16019 – Drama – Yes [1980]
- SD-16020 – Civilized Evil – Jean-Luc Ponty [1980]
- SD-16021 – Song of Seven – Jon Anderson [1980]
- SD-16022 – Bette Midler In Divine Madness (Soundtrack) [1980]
- SD-16023 – Super Trouper – ABBA [1980]
- SD-16024 – Clouds Across the Sun – Firefall [1980]
- SD-16025 – Made in America – Blues Brothers [1980]
- SD-16026 – Replay – Crosby Stills and Nash [1980]
- SD-16027 – All American Girls – Sister Sledge [1981] The label on this album is Cotillion.
- COC16028 – Sucking in the Seventies – Rolling Stones [1981] The label on this album is Rolling Stones.
- SD-16029 – Face Value – Phil Collins [1981]
- RR-16030 – Say No More – Badfinger [1981] The label on this album is Radio.
- SD-16031 – Live At Montreax – Mingus Dynasty [1981]
- SD-16032 – Labor of Love – Spinners [1981]
- SD-16033 – Dirty Deeds Done Dirt Cheap – AC/DC [1981]
- SS-16034 – Twangin' – Dave Edmunds [1981]
- SD-16035 – Doyawanna – L.A. [1981] The label on this album is Radio.
- SD-16036 – Mecca For Moderns – Manhattan Transfer [1981]
- SD-16037 – Songs of the Beatles – Sarah Vaughan [1981]
- WTG16038 – In The World – G.E. Smith [1981] The label on this album is Mirage.
- SD-16039 – Ph.D. – Ph.D. [1982] Also issued as SD-19361.
- SD-16040 – All Toys Break – Elusion [1981]
- SD-16041 – Brother Luck – ADC Band [1981]
- SD-16042 – Closer – Gino Soccio [1981]
- WTG16043 – Come an' Get It – Whitesnake [1981] The label on this album is Mirage.
- RR-16044 – Stars On Long Play – Stars On [1981] The label on this album is Radio.
- RR-16045 – Lonnie Youngblood – Lonnie Youngblood [1981] The label on this album is Radio.
- SD-16046 – Mellow – Herbie Mann [1981]
- SD-16047 – The Great Muppet Caper – Muppets [1981]
- SS-16048 – Sad Café [1981] The label on this album is Swan Song.
- SD-16049 – With You – Stacy Lattisaw [1981] The label on this album is Cotillion.
- RR-16050 – Seasons – Max Werner [1981] The label on this album is Radio.
- WTG16051 – The Night The Lights Went Out In Georgia (Soundtrack) – Various Artists [1981] The label on this album is Mirage.
- COC16052 – Tattoo You – Rolling Stones [1981] Label is on this album is Rolling Stones.

=== Multiple-album sets ===
Unlike many other labels, Atlantic issued multiple-LP sets in a special series. In fact, there were many of these special series, each with its own slant from the prospective of the Atlantic catalog makers.

Atlantic 2-300 Jazz Series

- SD-2-300 – The Evolution of Mann – Herbie Mann [1973] (2-LP set)
- SD-2-301 – The Art of the Modern Jazz Quartet – Modern Jazz Quartet [1973] (2-LP set)
- SD-2-302 – The Art of Charles Mingus: The Atlantic Years
- SD-2-303 – The Art of Rahsaan Roland Kirk – Art of Rahsaan Roland Kirk [1973] (2-LP set)
- SD2-304 – The Great Paris Concert – Duke Ellington [1973] (2-LP set)
- SD-2-305 – Inner Space – Chick Corea [1974] (2-LP set)
- SD-2-306 – The Commodore Years – Coleman Hawkins and Frank Wess [8/73] (2-LP set)
- SD-2-307 – The Commodore Years – Lester Young, Chu Berry, Ben Webster [8/73] (2- LP set)
- SD-2-308 – The Commodore Years – Jelly Roll Morton: New Orleans Memories and Last Band Dates
- SD-2-309 – The Commodore Years – Eddie Condon & Bud Freeman [1974] (2-LP set)
- SD-2-310 – The Commodore Years – Town Hall Jazz Concert 1945 [1973](2-LP set)
- SD-2-311 – Excursions – Eddie Harris [8/73] (2-LP set)
- SD-2-312 – Live at Montreux – Les McCann [8/73] (2-LP set)
- SD-2-313 – The Art of John Coltrane – John Coltrane [8/73] (2-LP set)
- SD-2-314 – The Art of Freddie Hubbard – Freddie Hubbard [8/73] (2-LP set)
- SD-2-315 – The Art of Hank Crawford – Hank Crawford [8/73] (2-LP set)
- SD-2-316 – The Jazz Years-25th Anniversary – Mose Allison [8/73] (2-LP set)
- SD-2-317 – The Art of Dave Brubeck: The Fantasy Years – Dave Brubeck [8/75] (2-LP set)
- SD-2-318 –
- SD-2-319 – The Art of Milt Jackson (The Atlantic Years) – Milt Jackson [8/75] (2-LP set)
- SD-2-320 –
- SD-2-321 – Turn of the Century – Gary Burton [1973] (2-LP set)

[SD-2-400 series used for Atco label]

Atlantic 2-500 Soul Series

This is a series of 2-LP sets.

- SD-2-500 – Heavy Soul – Various Artists [1972] (2-LP set)
- SD-2-501 – Wilson Pickett's Greatest Hits – Wilson Pickett [1973] (2-LP set)
- SD-2-502 – Ann Arbor Blues and Jazz Festival – Various Artists [1973] (2-LP set)
- SD-2-503 – Live – Ray Charles [1973] (2-LP set)
- SD-2-504 – The Atlantic Soul Years – Various Artists [1973] (2-LP set)
- SD-2-505 –
- SD-2-506 – [untitled] – Various Artists [unissued]
- SD-2-507 – Live – Blow Your Face Out – J. Geils Band [1976] (2-LP set)
- SD-2-508 – Live At CGBG's – Various Artists [1976] (2-LP set)
- SD-2-509 – Tomorrow Barretto Live – Ray Barretto [1977] (2-LP set)
- SD-2-510 – Yesshows – Yes [12/80] (2-LP set)

Atlantic 2-600 Jazz Series

This is an early series of 2-LP sets that lay dormant for a decade before being revived in the 1970s.

- 2-601 – Chris Connor Sings George Gershwin – Chris Connor [7/57] Two record set of Atlantic 1309 and 1310.
- 2-602 – The Art of Mabel Mercer – Mabel Mercer [1/58] (2-LP set)
- 2-603/SD-2-603 – European Concert – Modern Jazz Quartet [1961] Two record set of Atlantic SD-1385 and SD-1386.
- 2-604/SD-2-604 – Mabel Mercer and Bobby Short At Town Hall – Mabel Mercer and Bobby Short (2-LP set)
- SD-2-605 – Tootsie – Herbie Mann (2-LP set)
- SD-2-606 – Bobby Short Loves Cole Porter – Bobby Short [1971] (2-LP set)
- SD-2-607 – Mad About Noël Coward – Bobby Short [1972] (2-LP set)
- SD-2-608 – K-Ra-Zy For Gershwin – Bobby Short [1973] (2-LP set)
- SD-2-609 – Bobby Short Live At the Cafe Carlyle – Bobby Short [7/74]
- SD-2-610 – Bobby Short Celebrates Rodgers and Hart – Bobby Short [1975] (2-LP set)

[SD-2-700 and SD-2-800 series were used for the Atco label.]

Atlantic 2-900 Popular Series

This is a series of 2-LP sets.

- 2-900 – Ray Charles Story – Ray Charles [1962] (2-LP set) This album combines 8063 The Ray Charles Story, Volume 1 and 8064 The Ray Charles Story, Volume 2 in a two album package with a gatefold sleeve.
- SD-2-901 – Freedom Suite – Young Rascals [1969] (2-LP set)
- SD-2-902 – 4 Way Street – Crosby, Stills, Nash and Young [1971] (2-LP set)
- SD-2-903 – Manassas – Stephen Stills [1972] (2-LP set)
- SD-2-904 – Great American Songbook – Carmen McRae [1972] (2-LP set)
- SD-2-905 – The Giants of Jazz – Various Artists [1972] (2-LP set)
- SD-2-906 – Amazing Grace – Aretha Franklin [1972] (2-LP set)
- SD-2-907 – Bright Moments – Rahsaan Roland Kirk [2/74] (2-LP set)
- SD-2-908 – Tales From Topographic Oceans – Yes [1974] (2-LP set)
- SD-2-909 – The Last Concert – Modern Jazz Quartet [1974] (2-LP set)
- SD-2-910 – Spinners Live! [1975](2-LP set)

Atlantic 2-1000 Jazz Series

This is a series of 2-LP sets.

- SD-2-1000 – Jaques Brel is Alive and Well and Living in Paris (Soundtrack) – Francois Rauber [1968] (2-LP set)
- SD-2-1001 – 10 years Hence – Yusef Lateef [8/75] (2-LP set)
- SD-2-1002 – Person To Person – Average White Band [1976] (2-LP set)
- SD-2-1003 – The Vibration Continues – Rahssan Roland Kirk [3/78] (2-LP set)

Atlantic 2-2000 Popular Series

This is a series of 2-LP sets.

- SD-2-2000 – Three Sides Live – Genesis [1982] (2-LP set)
- SD-2-2001 –
- SD-2-2002 – Seconds Out – Genesis [1982?] (2-LP set) Reissue of Atlantic SD 2-9002.

Atlantic 2-3000 Jazz Series

These are 2-LP sets.

- SD-2-3000 – Atlantic Family Live at Montreux – Various Artists [7/78] (2-LP set)
- SD-2-3001 – Charles Mingus at Antibes – Charles Mingus [2/80] (2-LP set)

Atlantic 2-4000 Blues Series

A short series of blues and fusion music.

- SD-2-4000 – Sneak Attack – Buddy Miles Regiment [8/81] (2-LP set)
- SD-2-4001 – Last Mardi Gras – Professor Longhair [1982]
- SD-2-4002
- SD-2-4003 – Young Blood – The Coasters [1982]

Atlantic 2-7000 Popular Series

These are 2-LP sets.

- SD-2-7000 – Works, Volume 1 – Emerson Lake and Palmer [1977] (2-LP set)
- SD-2-7001
- SD-2-7002
- SD-2-7003 – Requiem – Lennie Tristano [1977] (2-LP set)
- SD-2-7004 – Live and More – Roberta Flack and Peabo Bryson [1980]
- SD-2-7005 – Concerts for the People of Kampuchea – Various Artists [1981] (2-LP set) All tracks live and in stereo.
- SD-2-7006 – Lennie Tristano Quartet – Lennie Tristano Quartet [2/82] (2-LP set)

Atlantic 2-9000 Series

These are 2-LP sets.

- SD-2-9000 – Live At Last – Bette Midler [1977] (2-LP set)
- COC-2-9001 – Love You Live – The Rolling Stones [1977] (2-LP set) The label on this album is Rolling Stones.
- SD-2-9002 – Seconds Out – Genesis [1977] (2-LP set)

Atlantic Three and Four Record Sets

- SD-3-100 – Yessongs – Yes [1973]
- SD-100 – A Tribute on the Occasion of Her 75th Birthday – Mabel Mercer [1/75] (4-LP set)
- SD-3-600 – Passions of a Man – Charles Mingus [6/78] (3-LP set)

=== Miscellaneous ===
ATLANTIC ALBUM DISCOGRAPHY, PART 12

Atlantic 3000 Jazz Series

- SD-3001 – Bagpipe Blues – Rufus Harley [1965]
- SD-3002 – Honeybuns – Duke Pearson Nonet [1966]
- SD-3003 – Portrait in Soul – Valerie Capers [1966]
- SD-3004 – Money in the Pocket – Joe Zawinul [1966]
- SD-3005 – Prairie Dog – Duke Pearson [1966]
- SD-3006 – Scotch and Soul – Rufus Harley [1966]
- SD-3007 – Here Comes the Whistleman – Roland Kirk [1967]
- SD-3008 – Deuces Wild – Sonny Stitt [1967]

Atlantic 4000 Poetry Series

- SD-4001 – Allen Ginsberg Reads Kaddish – Allen Ginsberg [1966]

Atlantic 7100 Stereo-Only Series

- SD-7101 – The Great Hits of Ray Charles Recorded on 8-Track Stereo – Ray Charles [1964]

Atlantic/Stax 7700 Reissue Series

Atlantic did reissue most of the Stax 700 album series with the same cover graphics and song lineup. See the Stax Discography for details of the albums. Atlantic added a 7 in front of the original Stax number.

- SD-7701 – Green Onions – Booker T. and the MG's Reissue of Stax 701.
- SD-7702 — Treasure Hits From The South – Various Artists Reissue of Stax 702
- SD-7703 — The Treasure Chest Of Goldies – Various Artists Reissue of Stax 703
- SD-7704 – Walking the Dog – Rufus Thomas Reissue of Stax 704.
- SD-7705 – Soul Dressing – Booker T. and the MG's Reissue of Stax 705.
- SD-7706 – Comfort Me – Carla Thomas Reissue of Stax 706.
- SD-7707 – Great Memphis Sound – Mar-Keys Reissue of Stax 707.
- SD-7708 – Hold on I'm Comin' – Sam and Dave Reissue of Stax 708.
- SD-7709 – Carla – Carla Thomas Reissue of Stax 709.
- SD-7710 – Memphis Gold – Various Artists Reissue of Stax 710.
- SD-7711 – And Now – Booker T. and the MG's Reissue of Stax 711.
- SD-7712 – Double Dynamite – Sam and Dave Reissue of Stax 712.
- SD-7713 – In the Christmas Spirit – Booker T. and the MG's Reissue of Stax 713.
- SD-7714 – Knock on Wood – Eddie Floyd Reissue of Stax 714.
- SD-7715 – Wanted One Soul Singer – Johnnie Taylor Reissue of Stax 715.
- SD-7716 – King and Queen – Otis Redding and Carla Thomas Reissue of Stax 716.
- SD-7717 – Hip Hugger – Booker T. and the MG's Reissue of Stax 717.
- SD-7718 – The Queen Alone – Carla Thomas Reissue of Stax 718.
- SD-7719 – Soul of a Bell – William Bell Reissue of Stax 719.
- SD-7720 – Back To Back – Mar-Keys and Booker T and the MG's Reissue of Stax 720.
- SD-7721 – Live In London Volume 1 – Various Artists Reissue of Stax 721.
- SD-7722 – Live In London Volume 2 – Various Artists Reissue of Stax 722.
- SD-7723 – Born Under a Bad Sign – Albert King Reissue of Stax 723.
- SD-7724 – Doin' Our Thing – Booker T. and the MG's Reissue of Stax 724.
- SD-7725 – Soul Men – Sam and Dave Reissue of Stax 725.
- SD-7726 – Memphis Gold Volume 2 – Various Artists Reissue of Stax 726.

Atlantic-Atco Sampler

- AT-1/ATSD-1 – Atlantic-Atco All-Star Showcase – Various Artists [1965]

The Atlantic Group

This lone record was issued on the Atlantic Group label. The label is red with "ATLANTIC GROUP" above the center hole. Below is the Atlantic Group logo, a black circle with "Dial" in yellow, "STAX" in green and "ATLANTIC" in red.

- SD-501 – The Super Hits – Various Artists [1967]

Special Numbers

- SD-11111 – For Those About to Rock We Salute You – AC/DC [1981]
- SD-19999 – Double Vision – Foreigner [1978]
- SD-29999 – Head Games – Foreigner [1979]
- SD-16999 – Foreigner 4 [1981]

=== R-001 –R-027 "Religious" ===
As would any major record label, Atlantic had, from 1967 to 1970, a numbering system solely devoted to gospel music and sermons.

- SD R-001 – Perspectives in Gospel – Garden State Choir [1967]
- SD R-002 – Presenting the Mighty Clouds of Harmony – Mighty Clouds of Harmony [1967]
- SD R-003 – Hark the Voice – Sondra Williams [1967]
- SD R-004 – Walter Arties Chorale Sings Jewels of Faith – Walter Arties Chorale [1967]
- SD R-005 – Shine on Me – Harmonizing Four [1967]
- SD R-006 – World's Greatest Gospel Organist – Alfred Bolden [1967]
- SD R-007 – When I've Done the Best I Can – Gospel Chimes [1967]
- SD R-008 – Gospel "Blessed With Soul" – Institutional Church of God in Christ [1967]
- SD R-009 – Presenting George Hines and the Gospel Winds – George Hines and the Gospel Winds [1968]
- SD R-010 – "In" Time – Garden State Choir [1968]
- SD R-011 – Didn't It Rain – Mighty Clouds of Harmony [1968]
- SD R-012 – Gospel Bliss – Richburg Singers [1968]
- SD R-013 – 40 Years of Singing Gospel – Harmonizing Four [1968]
- SD R-014 – Joy – Helen Robinson Youth Choir [1968]
- SD R-015 – Holy and Righteous – Utterbach Concert Ensemble [1968]
- SD R-016 – Lift Every Voice and Sing – Stars of Virginia [1968]
- SD R-017 – His Name Is Wonderful – Walter Arties Chorale [1968]
- SD R-018 – Gospel's Queen – Gloria Griffin [1968]
- SD R-019 – We Shall Overcome – Alfred Bolden [1969]
- SD R-020 – A Stirring Message – Rev. Edmond Blair [1968]
- SD R-021 – Grace – Institutional Church of God in Christ [1969]
- SD R-022 – Gospel Erupts – Garden State Choir [1969]
- SD R-023 – Gospel "Plus" – Mighty Clouds of Harmony [1969]
- SD R-024 – Jimmy Ellis with the Riverview Spiritual Singers – Jimmy Ellis [10/69]
- SD R-025 – Running For My Life – CYC Community Youth Choir [1969]
- SD R-026 – Tommie, Lonnie and Me – Harmonizing Four [1970]
- SD R-027 – George Hines and the Gospel Winds – George Hines and the Gospel Winds [1970]

=== Promotional records ===
Promotional or deejay records were issued regularly over the years. They were usually issued with white labels with black print in the same graphical designs as their commercial counterparts.

In addition, Atlantic issued a series of promotional albums using a 100 series. These are listed below, in an incomplete list.

- LS-ST-119 – Atco Records Promotional LP for Record Department-In-Store-Play – New York Rock and Roll Ensemble/Cream [1968] This record has one side containing selections from Atco 33–240, "The New York Rock and Roll Ensemble" and the Cream album Atco 2-700 "Wheels of Fire".
- TL-ST-121 – Atlantic Records Promotional LP for Record Department-In-Store-Play – Aretha Franklin/Rascals [1968] This record has one side containing selections from Atlantic LP8126 "Aretha Now" and the Rascals LP 8190 "Time Peace Greatest Hits".
- TL-ST-124 – Atco Records Promotional LP for Record Department In-Store Play – King Curtis and Buffalo Springfield [1968] This record has one side containing selections from King Curtis Atco LP 33-247 "Sweet Soul" and Buffalo Springfield's Atco LP 33-256 "Last Time Around".
- TL-ST-129 – Atlantic Records Promotional LP for Record Department-In-Store-Play – Booker T. and the MG's/Various Artists [1968] This record has one side containing selections from Atlantic LP 8202, "The Best of Booker T. and the MG's" and the various artists album Atlantic LP 8203 "Super Hits, Volume 3".
- TL-ST-131 – Atco Records Promotional LP for Record Department-In-Store-Play – Otis Redding/King Curtis [1967] This record has one side containing selections from Otis Redding Atco LP 33-265, "Otis Redding In Person At the Whiskey A Go Go" and King Curtis Atco LP 33-266 "The Best of King Curtis".
- TL-ST-132 – Atlantic Records Promotional LP for Record Department-In-Store-Play – Aretha Franklin/Archie Bell and the Drells [1968] This record has one side containing selections from Aretha Franklin Atlantic LP 8207, "Aretha In Paris" and Archie Bell and the Drells Atlantic LP 8204 "I Can't Stop Dancing".
- TL-ST-133 – Atlantic-Atco Records Promotional LP for Record Department-In-Store-Play – Booker T. and the MG's/Various Artists [1968] This record has one side containing selections from Stax LP 713 "In the Christmas Spirit" by Booker T. and the MG's and the other side selections from Atco LP 33 269 "Soul Christmas". Album has white promo labels, cover has a picture of the second version of Stax LP 713 (Santa cover) and Atco LP 33-269. A DJ introduces the songs on each side.
- TL-ST-134 – Atlantic Records Promotional LP for Record Department-In-Store-Play – Aretha Franklin/Clarence Carter [1968] This record has one side containing selections from Aretha Franklin Atlantic LP 8212 "Soul '69" and Clarence Carter Atlantic LP 8199 "The Dynamic Clarence Carter".
- TL-ST-135 – Atlantic Records Promotional LP for Record Department-In-Store-Play – Led Zeppelin/Dusty Springfield [1969] This record has one side containing selections from Dusty Springfield Atlantic LP 8214 "Dusty In Memphis" and Led Zeppelin Atlantic LP 8216 "Led Zeppelin".
- SP-137 – Freedom Suite Sampler – Rascals [1969]
- PR-160 – Pete Townshend Talks To and About Thunderclap Newman – Pete Townshend [1970] Label is Track.
- PR-164 – Interview with Mick Jagger by Tom Donahue – Mick Jagger [1971] This promotional release is on the Rolling Stones record label.
- PR-165 – Crosby, Stills, Nash and Young Month Celebration Copy – Crosby, Stills, Nash and Young [1971]
- PR-170 – Whatever's Fair! Atlantic's Soul Explosion '72 – Various Artists [1972] Two record set with white labels.
- PR-180 – Heavies for January from Atlantic, Atco & RSO – Various Artists [1973]
- PR-202 – Stop in the Name of Love – Hollies [1983] 12 Inch promo single, same song both sides
- PR-260 – Yes Solo LP Sampler – Yes [1976]
- PR-277 – Works, Volume 1 Sampler – Emerson, Lake and Palmer [1977]
- PR-278 – Westbound LP Sampler – Various Artists [1977]
- PR-281 – On Tour With Emerson, Lake and Palmer – Emerson Lake & Palmer [1979]
- PR-285 – Yes Music: An Evening with Jon Anderson – Yes [1977]
- PR-291 – Reggae on Broadway – Bob Marley and the Wailers [1981] 12 Inch single, same song on both sides.
- PR-300 – ABBA – ABBA [1978]
- PR-387 – Keep the Fire Burning – Gwen McCrae [1982] 12 Inch single, same song on both sides.
- PR-388 – Every Night/Lucille – Paul McCartney [1981] 12 Inch single.
- PR-414 – Chances Are – Bob Marley and the Wailers [1981] 12 Inch single, same song on both sides.
- PR-420 – As – Jean-Luc Ponty [1982] 12 Inch single, same song on both sides.
- PR-427 – One to One – Carole King [1982] 12 Inch single, same song on both sides.
- PR-432 – A Collection of Hits – ABBA [1982]
- PR-436 – The ABBA Special – ABBA [1983] Two record set.
- PR-439 – An Introduction to the Classics – Ray Charles, Albert King, Coasters and Professor Longhair [1983]

=== Related albums ===
This section includes some of the albums which are related to the Atlantic label, among them, the only album on National Records, and non-US reissues.

==== National Records ====
National Records was founded in 1944 by Al Green. The company was located at 1841 Broadway in New York City. The output of the label was pop, R&B, jazz, country and western, and gospel. A&R for the label was handled by Herb Abramson, Lee Magid and Bob Shad. The National Record catalog was acquired by Savoy Records in September 1957. There was only one LP released on the label.

- NLP-2001 – Billy Eckstine – Billy Eckstine [10/49] This was a 10-inch album.

==== Atlantic (France) ====
- 40 252 – Formidable Rhythm N Blues, Volume 1 – Various Artists [1972] Issued in mono only.
- 40 253 – Formidable Rhythm N Blues, Volume 2 – Various Artists [1972] Issued in mono only.
- 40 254 – Formidable Rhythm N Blues, Volume 3 – Various Artists [1972] Issued in mono only.
- 40 255 – Formidable Rhythm N Blues, Volume 4 – Various Artists [1972] Issued in mono only.
- 40 256 – Formidable Rhythm N Blues, Volume 5 – Various Artists [1972] Issued in mono only.
- 40 258 – Formidable Rhythm N Blues, Volume 8 – Various Artists [1972] Issued in mono only.
- 40 259 – Formidable Rhythm N Blues, Volume 9 – Various Artists [1972] Issued in mono only.
- 40 260 – Formidable Rhythm N Blues, Volume 10 – Various Artists [1972] Issued in mono only.
- 40 261 – Formidable Rhythm N Blues, Volume 11 – Various Artists [1972] Issued in mono only.
- 40 570 – Formidable Rhythm N Blues, Volume 7 – Various Artists [1972] Issued in mono only.
- 40 659 – Formidable Rhythm N Blues, Volume 6 – Various Artists [1972] Issued in mono only.

==== Atlantic (Germany) ====
- ATL 20 034 – Heavy & Alive – Various Artists [1972]
- ATL 50 734 – Sweet Soul Music – Various Artists [1981]
- ATL 50 836 – Sweet Soul Music, Volume 2 – Various Artists [1981]

==== Atlantic (Japan) ====
- P-4579 – Drifters Golden Hits – Drifters. Reissue of Atlantic 8153 with the same cover graphics.
- P-4580 – Rock and Roll – Ray Charles. Reissue of Atlantic 8006 with the same cover graphics.
- P-4581 – Rock and Roll – La Vern Baker. Reissue of Atlantic 8007 with the same cover graphics.
- P-4582 – New Orleans Piano – Professor Longhair. Reissue of Atco SD-7225.
- P-4583 – The Coasters. Reissue of Atco 33–101 with the same cover graphics.
- P-4584 – Clyde – Clyde McPhatter. Reissue of Atlantic 8031 with the same cover graphics.
- P-4585 – Rock and Roll – Ruth Brown. Reissue of Atlantic 8004 with the same cover graphics.
- P-4586 – Rock and Roll – Joe Turner. Reissue of Atlantic 8005 with the same cover graphics.
- P-4587 – King of the Stroll – Chuck Willis Reissue of Atlantic 8018 with the same cover graphics.
- P-4588 – The Clovers. Reissue of Atlantic 8009 with the same cover graphics.
- P-4589 – Atlantic Blues Special – Various Artists
- P-4590 – Atlantic Do Wap Special – Various Artists
- P-11570 – History of Rock & Roll (Atlantic Masterpieces) '55–'63 – Various Artists [1980s]

==== Atlantic (UK) ====
- K 20024 – The New Age of Atlantic – Various Artists [1972]
- K 20040X – Ben E. King – Ben E. King [1981]
- K 20072 – That's Soul, Vol. 5 – Various Artists [1969]
- K 50164 – Atlantic Black Gold, Volume 2 – Various Artists [1975]
