= The Best of John Coltrane =

Greatest hits album by John Coltrane
- Released: February 1970
- Recorded: April–May 1959 ("Cousin Mary", "Giant Steps", and "Naima") and October 21, 24 and 26, 1960 ("Central Park West", "Equinox", and "My Favorite Things") at Atlantic Studios, New York City, United States
- Genre: Hard bop, modal jazz
- Length: 41:15
- Language: Instrumental
- Label: Atlantic
- Producer: Nesuhi Ertegun
- Compiler: Nesuhi Ertegun

The Best of John Coltrane is a 1970 compilation album released by Atlantic Records collecting recordings made by jazz saxophonist John Coltrane. The album was released shortly after his death as a part of the "Atlantic Jazz Anthology"—a series of greatest hits compilations for Atlantic jazz artists—and features performances from his brief period recording for Atlantic with new liner notes by jazz journalist Nat Hentoff.

== Recording and reception ==
Professional ratings
Review scores
Source	Rating
The Rolling Stone Jazz Record Guide	5/5 stars

Three songs—"Cousin Mary", "Giant Steps", and "Naima"—come from his 1959 sessions for the album Giant Steps and represent the height of Coltrane's experimentation with Coltrane changes and sheets of sound. His cover version of "My Favorite Things" is a modal jazz interpretation of the standard Rodgers and Hammerstein composition from the album of the same name and was recorded in 1960 concurrent with the songs from 1964's Coltrane's Sound ("Central Park West" and "Equinox".) Although his recordings with Atlantic were a brief portion of his career, they represent a dramatic shift in his genre of jazz playing toward experimental free jazz as well as a change from tenor to soprano saxophone and the introduction of his classic quartet on the 1960 material. As this album only compiles his Atlantic material, it is not representative of his entire discography, the bulk of which was recorded for Impulse! Records. The album reached No. 20 on the Billboard Jazz Albums chart in February 1971.

In spite of the narrow scope of the compilation, it has received positive reviews. The Rolling Stone Jazz Record Guide gave the album five out of five stars and at AllMusic, the editorial staff gave it 4.5 out of five with reviewer Lindsay Planer writing that it is a "pithy yet effective compilation" that captures Coltrane "at his undisputed peak".

== Track listing ==
All songs composed by John Coltrane and published by Jowcol, BMI, except "My Favorite Things", composed by Richard Rodgers and Oscar Hammerstein and published by Williamson ASCAP

Side one

1. "My Favorite Things" (from My Favorite Things, 1961) – 13:41
2. "Naima" (from Giant Steps, 1960) – 4:21
3. "Giant Steps" (from Giant Steps) – 4:43

Side two

4. "Equinox" (from Coltrane's Sound, 1964) – 8:33
5. "Cousin Mary" (from Giant Steps) – 5:45
6. "Central Park West" (from Coltrane's Sound) – 4:12

== Personnel ==
Musicians on Giant Steps

- John Coltrane – tenor saxophone, band leader
- Paul Chambers – double bass
- Jimmy Cobb – drums on "Naima"
- Tommy Flanagan – piano on "Cousin Mary"
- Wynton Kelly – piano on "Naima"
- Art Taylor – drums on "Cousin Mary"

Musicians on Coltrane's Sound and My Favorite Things

- John Coltrane – soprano saxophone on "My Favorite Things", tenor and soprano saxophone on "Central Park West" and "Equinox", band leader
- Steve Davis – double bass
- Elvin Jones – drums
- McCoy Tyner – piano

Additional personnel

- Tom Dowd – engineering
- Nesuhi Ertegun – production
- Loring Eutemey – cover design
- Lee Friedlander – photography
- Nat Hentoff – liner notes
- Phil Iehle – engineering on Giant Steps
- Stephen Innocenzi – mastering on Giant Steps

== Release history ==
Date	Label	Format	Catalog
February 1970	Atlantic	LP	SD-1541
September 17, 1990	Atlantic	Compact Disc	1541‒2
