= Something Like a Bird =

Studio album by Charles Mingus
- Released: 1981
- Genre: Jazz
- Label: Atlantic
- Producer: Ilhan Mimaroglu, Raymond Silva

Professional ratings
Review scores
Source	Rating
Allmusic	3/5 stars
The Rolling Stone Jazz Record Guide	2/5 stars

Something Like a Bird is an album by Charles Mingus, released on the Atlantic label in 1981. The album reached a peak position of number 37 on the Billboard's Jazz Albums chart. Mingus is featured as composer and director but does not actually play on this album, as his ALS had progressed to the point that he was no longer able to do so. These were the last sessions of his own music he ever participated in, although he did attend one session for the partial collaboration with Joni Mitchell, Mingus before his death in January 1979.

== Reception ==
The Allmusic review states: "It's not essential but certainly colorful.".

== Track listing ==
1. "Something Like a Bird Part 1" (Mingus) -19:12
2. "Something Like a Bird Part 2" (Mingus) -12:14
3. "Farewell, Farwell" (Mingus) - 5:57
