= Patty & the Emblems =

Patty & the Emblems were an American pop group from Camden, New Jersey. The group was a one-hit wonder, scoring their only Top 40 hit in the U.S. and Canada with "Mixed-Up, Shook-Up, Girl" in 1964. Their follow-up was "I'm Confused."

The group continued recording singles until 1967, but never reached the same kind of success. Every member, except Patty Russell who left the industry, continued to have long-enduring music careers.

== Chart history for "Mixed-Up, Shook-Up, Girl" ==
Chart (1964)	Peak position
Canada RPM Top Singles	24
US Billboard Hot 100	37
US Cash Box Top 100	28

== Members ==
- Patty Russell (died September 5, 1998)
- Eddie Watts Sr.
- Vance Walker (died February 1, 2008)
- Alexander Wildes Sr. (died November 13, 1998)
