= Walter Benton (poet) =

American poet and writer (1904–1976)

Walter Potashnik Benton
- Born: October 27, 1904
- Died: March 7, 1976 (aged 71)
- Occupations: Poet, writer
- Known for: This Is My Beloved, poems

Walter Potashnik Benton (October 27, 1904 – March 7, 1976) was an American poet and writer.

== Life and career ==
Benton was born to Russian immigrant parents living in Austria. The family left Europe in 1913 to relocate to the United States during World War I. During the Great Depression, Benton worked various odd jobs, enabling him to attend Ohio University, where he graduated in 1934. Afterwards, he was employed as a social investigator by New York City and then served in the United States Army during World War II. After the war he returned to his job in New York City while pursuing a career as a writer. His work was published in Yale Review, Saturday Review of Literature, Esquire, The New Republic and several other publications.

His two books of poetry are his best-known works. This Is My Beloved was published in 1943 and has become one of the best-selling books of poetry. This volume was followed by another book of love poems, entitled Never a Greater Need, that was published in 1948.

Benton suffered a massive stroke c. 1965 and was cared for by his niece Jeannette until he had to be placed in a nursing home, where he died in 1976.

The American poet and singer Rod McKuen has said that his most romantic poetry was influenced by Benton's two books of poems.

== This Is My Beloved ==
His book of poems addressed to "Lillian" was written in diary form. It was described in 1949 as "forthright love poems" and said to be "the best-selling poetry volume of recent years" having sold 350,000 copies at that time. Atlantic Records issued it as the company's first 33 1/3-rpm long-playing album in March 1949, with the poem narrated by John Dall and scored for a 28 piece orchestra and 16 voice chorus. The jazz musician Arthur Prysock read verses from Benton's book of poems against a jazz instrumental backdrop on his album This Is My Beloved (rec. 1968, rel. 1969). Other recorded versions of the poems from This Is My Beloved were a 1956 narration by Alfred Ryder with a musical score by Vernon Duke and another in 1962 by Laurence Harvey accompanied by Herbie Mann.

== Bibliography ==
=== Poetry ===
- This Is My Beloved (1943). Random House. ISBN 978-0394404585
- Never a Greater Need (1948). Random House. ISBN 978-0394403922
