= All Sports Band =

American pop/rock group

- Genres: Rock, pop, Power pop
- Years active: 1981–1982
- Label: Radio Records
- Past members: Alfonso Carey; Jimmy Clark; Cy Sulak; Chuck Kentis; Michael John Toste

All Sports Band was an American pop/rock musical group who saw minor Billboard chart success in the early 1980s. The band was founded by Tracy Coats, who sought to appeal to a youthful market by dressing the band members as sports figures. Coats spent 18 months auditioning tapes before selecting the band members. The represented sports were auto racing, baseball, boxing, football, and martial arts. The band appeared on both Solid Gold and American Bandstand.

Coats explained his concept for the band, saying, "Most of the athletes I've known were closet rock 'n' rollers, and most of [the] musicians I've known were closet athletes. It seemed only natural to combine the two obsessions."

== Personnel ==
- Alfonso Carey (bass; dressed as a football player)
- Jimmy Clark (credited as "The Boxer") (drums; boxer)
- Cy Sulak (guitar; baseball player)
- Chuck Kentis (keyboards; race-car driver)
- Michael-John Toste (vocals; martial artist)

== Discography ==
All of the band's recordings appeared on Radio Records, a short-lived imprint of Atlantic Records.

=== Album ===
All Sports Band

- Released: 1981
- Format: LP
- Label: Radio Records
- Writers: Alfonso Carey, Jimmy Clark, Chuck Kentis, Cy Sulak, Michael John Toste
- Producer: Joey Carbone and Richie Zito
- Tracks: 10
- Singles: "I'm Your Superman", "Opposites Do Attract"

=== Singles ===
Year	Title	Peak chart positions	Album
Year	Title	US	Album
1981	"I'm Your Superman"	93	All Sports Band
1981	"Opposites Do Attract"	78	All Sports Band
1982	"Givin' Your Love To Me"	—	Non-album single
1982	"Jet Set"	—	Non-album single

"—" denotes a recording that did not chart or was not released in that territory.
