= The Boss of the Blues =

1956 live album by Big Joe Turner

Studio album by Big Joe Turner
- Released: June 1956
- Genre: Blues; swing
- Label: Atlantic
- Producer: Nesuhi Ertegun, Jerry Wexler

Big Joe Turner chronology
Joe Turner and Pete Johnson (1955)	The Boss of the Blues (1956)	Rock & Roll (1957)

Professional ratings
Review scores
Source	Rating
Allmusic	5/5 stars

The Boss of the Blues is a 1956 album by the American singer Big Joe Turner. Originally released on the Atlantic label, the album has been reissued many times on cassette and CD by Atlantic, Rhino and Collectables.

== History ==
From the 1920s through the 1930s, Turner and boogie-woogie pianist Pete Johnson enjoyed a successful and highly influential collaboration that, following their appearance together at Carnegie Hall on December 23, 1938, helped launch a craze for boogie-woogie in the United States. After the pair separated, Turner continued to experience cross-genre musical success, establishing himself as one of the founders of rock and roll with such smash hits as "Shake, Rattle and Roll", but he did not turn his back on his roots. The Boss of the Blues marks one of the last reunions Turner would have with Johnson, when, supported by a number of swing's best performers, he re-created a number of the classic tracks that had helped lay the groundwork for rhythm and blues.

The bold, vigorous arrangements by the veteran Ernie Wilkins fully represent the traditions of Kansas City music, while also giving a 'mainstream' platform to the musicians, not all of whom, including both Pete Brown and Lawrence Brown, had Kansas City backgrounds.

== Track listing ==
Except where otherwise indicated, all tracks composed by Pete Johnson and Big Joe Turner.

1. "Cherry Red" – 3:21
2. "Roll 'Em Pete" – 3:41
3. "I Want a Little Girl" (Murray Mencher, Billy Moll) – 4:16
4. "Low Down Dog" (Turner) – 3:38
5. "Wee Baby Blues" – 7:15
6. "You're Driving Me Crazy (What Did I Do?)" (Walter Donaldson) – 4:10
7. "How Long Blues" (traditional) – 5:43
8. "Morning Glories" (traditional) – 3:39
9. "St. Louis Blues" (W. C. Handy) – 4:17
10. "Piney Brown Blues" – 4:49

== Personnel ==
=== Performance ===
- Lawrence Brown – trombone
- Pete Brown – alto saxophone
- Freddie Green – guitar
- Pete Johnson – piano
- Cliff Leeman – drums
- Joe Newman – trumpet, except tracks 3, 5, 6, 8 and 9
- Jimmy Nottingham – trumpet on tracks 3, 5, 6 and 9
- Walter Page – double bass
- Seldon Powell – tenor saxophone on tracks 3, 5, 6 and 9
- Big Joe Turner – vocals
- Frank Wess – tenor saxophone, except tracks 3, 5, 6, 8 and 9

=== Production ===
- Whitney Balliett – liner notes
- Bob Defrin – art direction, design
- Nesuhi Ertegun – production, supervision
- Len Frank – engineering
- Marvin Israel – artwork
- Curtice Taylor – hand coloring
- Jerry Wexler – production, supervision
- Ernie Wilkins – arrangements
