= The Drifters' Golden Hits =

Greatest hits album by The Drifters
- Released: 1968
- Recorded: 1959–1966
- Genres: R&B; Doo-wop
- Length: 29:47
- Label: Atlantic
- Producers: Bert Berns, Jerry Leiber, Mike Stoller

The Drifters chronology
Where the Music's Playing (1966)	The Drifters' Golden Hits (1968)	Their Greatest Recordings (Early Years) (1971)

Professional ratings
Review scores
Source	Rating
Allmusic	2.5/5 stars

The Drifters' Golden Hits is a 1968 compilation album by American doo-wop/R&B vocal group The Drifters.

The album was included in Robert Christgau's "Basic Record Library" of 1950s and 1960s recordings, published in Christgau's Record Guide: Rock Albums of the Seventies (1981). In 2012, Rolling Stone listed the album at #459 in its list of "Rolling Stone's 500 Greatest Albums of All Time". Originally released on the Atlantic label, the album has been re-released on CD by Atlantic. A Drifters' compilation by the same name was released by Intercontinental records in 1996, but it has a different track listing.

== Chart performance ==
The collection of the bands' later hits peaked at No. 22 on Billboard's Hot R&B LP's chart, and also reached No. 122 on the Billboard Top LPs chart, during an eight-week run on it.

== Track listing ==
Title	Composer(s)	Time	Previous album release	Charts
1."There Goes My Baby"	Benjamin Nelson, Lover Patterson, George Treadwell	2:13	The Drifters' Greatest Hits (1960)	#1 Black Singles
2."(If You Cry) True Love, True Love"	Doc Pomus, Mort Shuman	2:23	The Drifters (1964)	
3."Dance with Me"	Lewis Lebish, Jerry Leiber, Irving Nahan, Mike Stoller, Treadwell	2:26	The Drifters' Greatest Hits	#2 "Black Singles" #17 UK Singles
4."This Magic Moment"	Pomus, Shuman	2:30	The Drifters' Greatest Hits	#4 "Black Singles"
5."Save the Last Dance for Me"	Pomus, Shuman	2:30	The Drifters' Greatest Hits	#1 "Black Singles" #2 UK
6."I Count the Tears"	Pomus, Shuman	2:15	Save the Last Dance for Me (1962)	#28 UK
7."Some Kind of Wonderful"	Gerry Goffin, Carole King	2:38	Save the Last Dance for Me	
8."Up on the Roof"	Goffin, King	2:38	The Drifters	#4 "Black Singles" #5 "Pop Singles"
9."On Broadway"	Cynthia Weil, Barry Mann, Leiber, Stoller	3:02	The Drifters	#7 "Black Singles" #9 "Pop Singles"
10."Under the Boardwalk"	Arthur Resnick, Kenny Young	2:42	The Drifters	#4 "Black Singles" #4 "Pop Singles"#45 UK
11."I've Got Sand in My Shoes"	Resnick, Young	2:49	I'll Take You Where the Music's Playing	
12."Saturday Night at the Movies"	Weil, Mann	2:29	The Drifters	#18 "Black Singles" #18 "Pop Singles"

== Personnel ==
=== Performance ===
==== The Drifters ====
- Ben E. King – lead vocals (tracks 1, 3 – 6); backing vocals (track 2)
- Johnny Lee Williams – lead vocals (track 2); backing vocals (tracks 3–6)
- Rudy Lewis – lead vocals (tracks 7 – 9)
- Johnny Moore – lead vocals (tracks 10 – 12)
- Charlie Thomas – backing vocals (all tracks)
- Dock Green – backing vocals (tracks 1 – 8)
- Gene Pearson – backing vocals (tracks 9 – 12)
- Elsbeary Hobbs – backing vocals (tracks 1 – 6)
- Tommy Evans – backing vocals (tracks 7 – 9)
- Johnny Terry – backing vocals (tracks 10 – 12)
- Abdul Samad – guitar (tracks 2 – 12)
- Reggie Kimber – guitar (track 1)

==== Other personnel ====
- Doris Troy – additional backing vocals (tracks 5 – 7)
- Dee Dee Warwick – additional backing vocals (tracks 5 – 7)
- Dionne Warwick – additional backing vocals (tracks 5 – 7)
- Cissy Houston – additional backing vocals (tracks 5 – 7)

=== Production ===
- Stan Applebaum – arranger
- Bert Berns – producer
- Charlie Brown – liner notes
- Ray Ellis – arranger
- Loring Eutemey – design
- Jerry Leiber – producer
- Jonny Meadow – research
- Zal Schreiber – mastering
- Garry Sherman – arranger
- Mike Stoller – producer
- Teacho Wiltshire – arranger

== Charts ==
Chart (1968)	Peak position
US Billboard Top LPs	122
US Billboard Hot R&B LPs	33
