= The Best of Ray Charles =

Greatest hits album by Ray Charles
- Released: 1970
- Genre: R&B, Jazz
- Length: 34:06
- Label: Atlantic

The Best of Ray Charles is a compilation album released in 1970 on the Atlantic Jazz label, featuring previously released instrumental (non-vocal) tracks recorded by Ray Charles between November 1956 and November 1958.

The instrumental, "Rockhouse" would later be covered, as "Ray's Rockhouse" (1985), by The Manhattan Transfer with lyrics by Jon Hendricks.

== Track listing ==
1. "Hard Times" (Mitchell) – 4:39
2. "Rockhouse" (Charles) – 3:50
3. "Sweet Sixteen Bars" (Charles) – 4:04
4. "Doodlin'" (Silver) – 5:49
5. "How Long Blues" (Carr) – 9:15
6. "Blues Waltz" (Charles) – 6:29

== Personnel ==
"Hard Times"

- Ray Charles – piano
- David Newman – alto sax
- Bennie Crawford – baritone sax
- Marcus Belgrave – trumpet
- Edgar Willis – bass
- Milton Turner – drums
- Recorded on November 5, 1958
- Recording engineer: Tom Dowd
- Produced by Nesuhi Ertegun and Jerry Wexler

"Rockhouse"

- Tenor sax solo by David Newman
- Other personnel not mentioned (possibly same as Track 4)
- Produced by Ahmet Ertegun and Jerry Wexler

"Sweet Sixteen Blues"

- Ray Charles – piano
- Roosevelt Sheffield – bass
- William Peeples – drums
- Recorded on November 26, 1956
- Recording engineers: Earle Brown and Tom Dowd
- Produced by Nesuhi Ertegun and Jerry Wexler

"Doodlin'"

- Ray Charles – piano
- David Newman – tenor sax
- Emmott Dennis – baritone sax
- Joseph Bridgewater – trumpet
- John Hunt – trumpet
- Roosevelt Sheffield – bass
- William Peeples – drums
- Trumpet solo by John Hunt
- Arranger: Quincy Jones
- Recorded on November 26, 1956
- Recording engineers: Earle Brown and Tom Dowd
- Produced by Nesuhi Ertegun and Jerry Wexler

"How Long Blues"

- Ray Charles – alto sax and piano
- Milt Jackson – vibraharp (and piano during Ray Charles’ alto sax chorus and Pettiford’s first chorus on bass)
- Billy Mitchell – tenor sax
- Skeeter Best – guitar
- Oscar Pettiford – bass
- Connie Kay – drums
- Recorded on September 12, 1957
- Recording engineer: Tom Dowd
- Produced by Nesuhi Ertegun

"Blues Waltz"

- Ray Charles – piano
- Bennie Crawford – baritone sax
- David Newman – tenor sax
- Lee Harper – trumpet
- Marcus Belgrave – trumpet
- Edgar Willis – bass
- Richie Goldberg – drums
- Recorded at the Newport Jazz Festival, Newport, Rhode Island, on July 5, 1958
- Recording engineers: Harold Chapman and Tom Dowd
- Produced by Nesuhi Ertegun

=== Other credits ===
- Sleevenotes: Ralph J. Gleason
- Cover photo: Ray Ross
- Cover design: Loring Eutemey

== Chart positions ==
Chart (2013)	Peak position
French Albums (SNEP)	200
