= Michael Cochrane (musician) =

American jazz pianist (born 1948)

Michael Cochrane (born September 4, 1948 in Peekskill, New York) is an American jazz pianist who has recorded extensively for SteepleChase Records, as well as Soul Note and Landmark Records.

As a sideman, he has recorded with Marvin Peterson, Oliver Lake, Sonny Fortune and Jack Walrath.

== Discography ==
As a Leader

- Elements (Soul Note, 1985) with Tom Harrell, Trumpet; Bob Malach, Tenor Saxophone, Flute; Dennis Irwin, Bass; James Madison, Drums
- Song of Change (Soul Note, 1992)
- Impressions (Landmark, 1995)
- Cutting Edge (Steeplechase, 1997)
- Footprints (Steeplechase, 1998)
- Gesture of Faith (Steeplechase, 2000)
- Minor Matrix (Steeplechase, 2000)
- Quartet Music (Steeplechase, 2001)
- Pathways (Steeplechase, 2000)
- Right Now (Steeplechase, 2007)

With Sonny Fortune

- Waves of Dreams (Horizon, 1976)

With Jack Walrath

- Revenge of the Fat People (Stash, 1981)
- In Europe (SteepleChase, 1982)
- A Plea for Sanity (Stash, 1982)
- Jack Walrath Quintet at Umbria Jazz Festival, Vol. 1 (Red, 1983 [1985])
- Jack Walrath Quintet at Umbria Jazz Festival, Vol. 2 (Red, 1983 [1985])
- Gut Feelings (Muse, 1990 [1992])

With Nancy Monroe

- Dance My Heart (mja Records, 1994)
- The Love Within (mja Records, 2001)

With David Alan Gross

- The Final Answer To Everything (mja records, 1997)
