= Ronnie Burrage =

American jazz drummer (born 1959)

Ronnie Burrage (born James Ronaldo Burrage October 19, 1959) is an American jazz drummer. His style draws from jazz, funk, and soul.

== Career ==
He was born in St. Louis, Missouri, United States. Burrage sang in the St. Louis Cathedral boys' choir from age seven to eleven and performed with Duke Ellington at the age of nine. He was introduced to jazz by listening to music every day from uncles and grandparents. He played drums, percussion, and vibraphone and sang in funk, R&B, and jazz groups, including The Soul Flamingos, Fontella Bass, Oliver Sain, Third Circuit & Spirit, Rainbow Glass, and Expression Jazz Quintet.

From age 15 to 17, Burrage was a member of No Commercial Potential with Mark Friedrick on keyboards, Darryl Mixon on bass, and Richie Daniels on guitar. They were the opening act for George Duke and Gino Vannelli. Burrage played in clubs, concerts, and venues, including the annual Afro Day in the Park in St. Louis. When he was 17, he moved to New York City, and played with Lester Bowie, Defunkt, Teruo Nakamura, Roland Hanna, and Major Holley. In 1978, on a full music scholarship, he attended North Texas State University.

As a member of the St. Louis Metropolitan Jazz Quintet in the early 1980s, he worked with musicians coming through St. Louis, such as Arthur Blythe, Andrew Hill, Jackie McLean, and McCoy Tyner. After working with Woody Shaw, he founded an avant-garde jazz group named Third Kind of Blue with Anthony Cox and John Purcell. In the 1990s, he recorded with Billy Bang, Hamiet Bluiett, Sonny Fortune, Courtney Pine, Gunther Schuller, and the World Saxophone Quartet.

The Burrage Ensemble was his first band, playing primarily in New York City from 1980 to 1983 and at jazz festivals in Philadelphia, St. Louis, Boston, and Washington, D.C. Members were Kenny Kirkland, Marcus Miller, and Joe Ford. Other members of the ensemble included Rasul Siddik, Branford Marsalis, Avery Sharpe, Wynton Marsalis, and Wallace Roney.

In 1989, he performed in Charles Mingus' Epitaph. At Jazzmobile from 1994 to 2002, he was instructor in drums and percussion while also teaching at the University of the Arts in Philadelphia from 1994 to 1996. He was a substitute instructor at The New School in New York City from 1992 to 2000. He is producer and artistic director at BlueNoise Studio in Frederick, Maryland. At Pennsylvania State University he teaches hip hop and culture, African- and African-American studies, and Integrative Arts.

== Discography ==
=== As leader/co-leader ===
- Third Kind of Blue (Minor Music, 1986)
- Four Play (DIW, 1990) with Clifford Jordan, James Williams and Richard Davis
- Shuttle (Sound Hills, 1993) with Hamiet Bluiett, Cyrus Chestnut
- Invitation (Candid, 2000)
- Just Natural (West Wind, 2001)
- In It (RoBurrage, 2004)
- Bluenoise (CD Baby, 2010)

=== As co-leader ===
- The Young Lions, Live at the Kool Jazz Festival 1982 (Elektra Musician, 1983)
- Third Kind of Blue, Trio w/John Purcell and Anthony Cox (Minor Music, 1985)
- Abstract Truth (w/John Purcell, Harry Pepl, Kenny Davis, Paul Zauner) - Beginnings (Amadeo, 1994)
- Paul Zauner, Jean-Paul Bourelly, Harry Sokal, Lonnie Plaxico - Mag Five (PAO, 1998)

=== As sideman ===
With Ray Anderson

- It Just So Happens (Enja, 1987)

With Hamiet Bluiett

- The Clarinet Family (Black Saint, 1987)
- Bluiett's Barbecue Band (Mapleshade, 1996)
- Bluiett Baritone Nation - Libation for the Baritone Saxophone Nation (Justin Time, 1998)
- Bluiett Baritone Saxophone Group - Live at the Knitting Factory (Knitting Factory, 1998)

With Sonny Fortune

- Invitation (Why Not, 1987)
- Four in One (Blue Note, 1994)
- A Better Understanding (Blue Note, 1995)
- In the Spirit of John Coltrane (Shanachie, 1999)

With Joe Locke

- Present Tense (Steeplechase, 1989)
- Etch a Sketch (Steeplechase, 1991)

With Teruo Nakamura

- Live at Carnegie Hall (Agharta, 1979)
- Big Apple (Agharta, 1980)
- Route 80 (Agharta, 1985)

With Daniel Schnyder

- The City (Enja, 1988)
- Decoding the Message (Enja, 1989)

With Avery Sharpe

- Unspoken Words (Sunnyside, 1988)
- Extended Family (JPNM, 1993)

With Jarek Smietana

- Ballads and Other Songs (Starling, 1994)
- You Never Know (Power Bros., 1997)

With Jack Walrath

- Master of Suspense (Blue Note, 1987)
- Neohippus (Blue Note, 1988)
- Out of the Tradition (Muse, 1990 [1992])
- Gut Feelings (Muse, 1990 [1992])

With World Saxophone Quartet

- Breath of Life (Elektra Musician/Nonesuch, 1992)
- Takin' It 2 the Next Level (Justin Time, 1996)

With others

- Ahmed Abdullah's Diaspora and Francisco Mora Catlett's AfroHORN - Jazz: A Music of the Spirit (Amedian, 2019)
- Ray Anderson - It Just So Happens (Enja, 1987)
- Billy Bang - Bang On! (Justin Time, 1997)
- Dale Barlow - Timeline Observatory (The Sessions, 2012)
- Kelvyn Bell - Kelynator (Blue Heron, 1986)
- Stanley Cowell Trio (w/Cecil McBee) - Close to You Alone (DIW, 1990)
- Ronnie Cuber - Live with Randy Brecker, Lonnie Smith at the Blue Note (Pro Jazz, 1986)
- Defunkt - Defunkt (Hannibal, 1979)
- Richard Davis and Friends - Live at Sweet Basil's (Sweet Basil, 1991)
- Santi Debriano - Soldiers of Fortune (Freelance, 1989)
- Barbara Dennerlein - Straight Ahead (Enja, 1988)
- Kevin Eubanks - Guitarist (Elektra Musician, 1985)
- Chico Freeman - Destiny's Dance (Contemporary, 1981)
- Daved Friedman - Shades of Change (Enja, 1986)
- Mac Gollehon - Nostalgia (Half Note, 1999)
- Eddie Gomez - Live in Moscow (B&W, 1993)
- Roland Hanna - Roland Hanna Plays Gershwin (LRC, 1993)
- Julius Hemphill - Julius Hemphill Big Band (Elektra/Musician, 1988)
- John Hicks - Trio + Strings (Mapleshade, 1997)
- Shunzo Ohno (w/Kenny Kirkland, Marcus Miller a.o.) - Antares (Electra Bird, 1981)
- Eric Person - Arrival (Soul Note, 1992)
- Courtney Pine - Modern Day Jazz Story (Verve, 1995)
- Ed Schuller - Snake Dancing (Tutu, 1998)
- Gunther Schuller - Out of the Blues (GM, 1991)
- Archie Shepp - Gemini (Archie Ball, 2007)
- Dave Stryker - Stryke Zone (Steeplechase, 1991)
- McCoy Tyner - Live Montreux-New York Connection (Swiss CBS, 1979)
- Fred Wesley and Kenny Garrett - New York Funk (Jim Payne, 1992)
