= Commandment (For the Sculpture of Alain Kirili) =

Live album by Billy Bang
- Released: 1997
- Recorded: March 30, 1997
- Venue: The loft of Alain Kirili and Ariane Lopez-Huici, New York City
- Genre: Free jazz
- Label: No More Records; No.5
- Producer: Alan Schneider

Billy Bang chronology
Bang On! (1997)	Commandment (For the Sculpture of Alain Kirili) (1997)	Big Bang Theory (2000)

Commandment (For the Sculpture of Alain Kirili) is a live solo album by violinist Billy Bang. It was recorded on March 30, 1997, at the loft of sculptor Alain Kirili and photographer Ariane Lopez-Huici in New York City, and was released later that year by No More Records.

Kirili and Lopez-Huici began sponsoring programs of free jazz in their loft during the 1980s, and went on to present seven or eight concerts a year. Other than Bang, guest musicians included Steve Lacy, Cecil Taylor, Roscoe Mitchell, Archie Shepp, Sunny Murray, and Roswell Rudd. On the album, which was conceived as a dialogue between Bang and Kirili, the violinist can be heard responding to aspects of Kirili's sculptures as he walked among them.

== Reception ==
Professional ratings
Review scores
Source	Rating
AllMusic	4.5/5 stars
The Penguin Guide to Jazz	3.5/4 stars
The Rolling Stone Jazz Record Guide	4/5 stars
Tom Hull – on the Web	B
The Virgin Encyclopedia of Jazz	3/5 stars

In a review for AllMusic, Chris Kelsey wrote: "Bang does a remarkable job building his performance. Ideas flow and are elaborated upon and transformed. Every track has an individual character; each can stand on its own, yet works as part of the whole. His dexterity is extraordinary, yet as fluent as Bang is, it's his passion that carries the day."

The authors of The Penguin Guide to Jazz Recordings stated: "The sheer physicality of this solo date... is astonishing."

John Murph of JazzTimes commented: "With the program geared towards Alain Kirilli's oblique sculptures, it's understandable why much of this performance opts for rhythmically challenging passages versus curvaceous contoured etchings. But despite such esoteric angularities, Commandment is a worthy listen."

La Folia's Steve Koenig remarked: "On Commandment, Bang speaks about the difference between hardness and softness, water and flow, his southern roots, faith, and these all come out in the music... Sit in your chair, listen, enjoy the photos of the sculpture and the space, and feel blessed."

A writer for Coda called the album "an intimate affair with the violinist calling tunes as though you were sitting in his living room in Harlem on a cool spring evening."

== Track listing ==
1. "Intro" (Billy Bang) – 1:04
2. "Pieta" (Billy Bang) – 7:57
3. "'Bama Swing" (Billy Bang) – 7:14
4. "Commandment" (Billy Bang) – 7:15
5. "Daydreams" (Billy Bang) – 12:39
6. "Swing Low, Sweet Chariot" (Traditional) – 8:59
7. "'Bama Swing Again" (Billy Bang) – 7:31
8. "They Plan to Leave" (Sun Ra) – 11:32
9. "Music For the Love of It" (Billy Bang/Lawrence Douglas) – 7:09

== Personnel ==
- Billy Bang – violin
