= Killer Bunnies =

Killer Bunnies may refer to:

- Killer Bunnies (dance project), a Canadian project
- Killer Bunnies (album), an album by Jack Walrath

== See also ==
- Killer Bunnies and the Quest for the Magic Carrot, a noncollectible card game
- "Killa Bunnies", a song by Moloko from the album Do You Like My Tight Sweater?
- Killer Rabbit, a character from Monty Python and the Holy Grail, see Rabbit of Caerbannog
