= Four in One =

Four in One may refer to:

- Four in One (TV series), a wheel series broadcast in the United States on the NBC television network
- Four in One (Sphere album), 1982
- Four in One (Sonny Fortune album), 1994
- "Four in One" (composition), a 1951 composition by Thelonious Monk
