= Marmande (disambiguation) =

Marmande is a commune in the Lot-et-Garonne département in south-western France.

Marmande may also refer to:

- a French tomato cultivar originating from the commune of Marmande

== People with the surname ==
- Francis Marmande (1945–2025), a French author, musician and journalist
- René de Marmande (1875–1949), a French journalist and anarchist
