= Huser (surname) =

Huser or Hüser is a surname. Notable people with the surname include:

- France Huser (born 1939), French novelist and art critic
- Geri Huser (born 1963), American politician
- Glen Huser (born 1943), Canadian fiction writer
- Kirsten Huser Leschbrandt (born 1945), Norwegian politician
- Lilay Huser (born 1958), German-Turkish actress
- Pascal Huser (born 1995), Dutch football player
- Robin Huser (born 1998), Swiss football midfielder
- Uwe Hüser (born 1958), German politician
