= Wayne Dockery =

American musician (1941–2018)

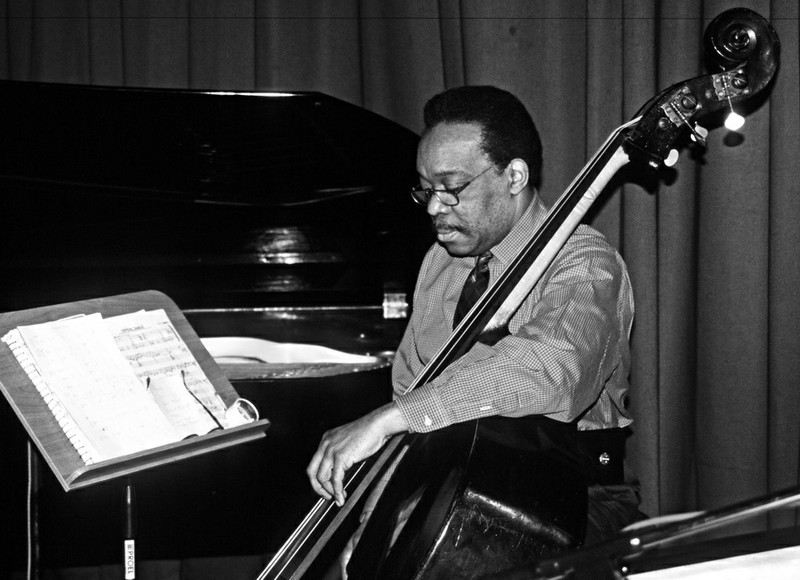
Wayne Dockery

Wayne Dockery (June 27, 1941 – June 11, 2018) was an American jazz double bassist who worked with George Benson, Sonny Fortune, Eddie Henderson, Hal Galper, Archie Shepp, Michael Brecker, Billy Harper, and others. He appears on albums from at least 1971, although never as a bandleader. His brother was pianist Sam Dockery. He moved to Paris in the early 90's and died there after a long illness.

== Partial Discography ==
With George Benson

- In Concert-Carnegie Hall (CTI, 1975)

With Junior Cook

- The Place to Be (SteepleChase, 1988)

With Sonny Fortune

- Long Before Our Mothers Cried (Strata-East, 1974)
- Awakening (Horizon, 1975)
- A Better Understanding (Blue Note, 1995)

With Hal Galper

- Reach Out! (SteepleChase, 1976)
- Ivory Forest (Enja, 1979)

With Billy Harper

- Trying to Make Heaven My Home (MPS, 1979)
