= Kamau (album) =

Studio album by Charles Sullivan
- Released: 1996
- Recorded: November 17 & 18, 1995
- Studio: EastSide Sound, NYC
- Genre: Jazz
- Length: 60:30
- Label: Arabesque; AJ-0121
- Producer: Kamau Adilifu, Daniel Criss

Charles Sullivan chronology
Re-Entry (1975)	Kamau (1996)	Jam Session Vol. 11 (2004)

Kamau is an album by trumpeter Charles Sullivan (who had changed his name to Kamau Adilifu) which was recorded in 1995 and released on the Arabesque label.

== Reception ==
Professional ratings
Review scores
Source	Rating
AllMusic	4/5 stars

The AllMusic review by Scott Yanow said "The frequently modal music is in some ways a throwback to the acoustic scene of the 1970s in that there are long melody statements and a liberal use of vamps. Adilifu's six originals generally develop slowly but are quite effective in setting moods ... Everyone plays up-to-par, making Kamau Adilifu/Charles Sullivan's "comeback" record quite successful as creative jazz".

== Track listing ==
All compositions by Charles Sullivan (Kamau Adilifu)

1. "Carefree" – 11:06
2. "Dreams Die Young in the Eyes of the Native Son" – 11:56
3. "Malcolm" – 9:32
4. "Patrice" – 12:16
5. "Last Embrace" – 5:37
6. "Looking for Love" – 9:57

== Personnel ==
- Charles Sullivan – trumpet
- Craig Handy – tenor saxophone, soprano saxophone
- Kenny Barron – piano
- Rodney Whitaker – double bass
- Victor Lewis – drums
