= A Plea for Sanity =

Studio album by The Jack Walrath Group
- Released: 1983
- Recorded: September 1982
- Studio: Lobel Studios, Nest New York, NJ
- Genre: Jazz
- Label: Stash; ST-223
- Producer: Bernard Brightman

Jack Walrath chronology
In Europe (1982)	A Plea for Sanity (1983)	Jack Walrath Quintet at Umbria Jazz Festival, Vol. 1 (1982)

A Plea for Sanity is an album by trumpeter Jack Walrath which was recorded in 1982 and released on the Stash label in 1983.

== Reception ==
Professional ratings
Review scores
Source	Rating
AllMusic	4.5/5 stars

The AllMusic review by Scott Yanow stated "This is one of the best showcases for Jack Walrath's trumpet playing. ... The music falls into the wide area of post-bop, more advanced than hard bop but not as free as most avant-garde music. Walrath, who has always had a gift for coming up with memorable song titles (including on this LP "Li'l Stinker," "A Plea for Sanity," and "At Home in Rome"), gives each selection its own purpose and his solos are full of spirit and consistent invention. Recommended".

== Track listing ==
All compositions by Jack Walrath except where noted

1. "Hi Jinx" – 6:45
2. "Ballad for Old Time's Sake" (Michael Cochrane) – 5:15
3. "Li'l Stinker" – 5:30
4. "Free Fall" (Cochrane) – 3:35
5. "Mucene the Genii" – 6:05
6. "A Plea for Sanity" – 4:53
7. "At Home in Rome" – 6:05

== Personnel ==
- Jack Walrath – trumpet
- Michael Cochrane – piano
- Anthony Cox – bass
