= Charles Sullivan (musician) =

American trumpeter, composer, and bandleader

- Also known as: Kamau Adilifu
- Born: Charles Henry Sullivan; November 8, 1944 (age 81); New York City, New York, U.S.
- Genres: Jazz
- Occupations: Musician, composer, producer, bandleader
- Instruments: Trumpet, Flugelhorn
- Years active: 1965-present
- Website: kamauadilifu.com

Charles Henry Sullivan (born November 8, 1944), also known as Kamau Adilifu, is an American jazz trumpeter, composer, and bandleader. He has recorded four albums as leader. He also made recordings as a sideman with Woody Shaw, Dollar Brand, Ricky Ford, and King Curtis, among others.

== Biography ==
Charles Sullivan was born in New York City. Growing up, Sullivan was taught how to play the trumpet from his two uncles who were both trumpet players. He went on to earn a bachelor's degree from the Manhattan School of Music in 1967. He also worked for multiple off-Broadway productions shortly before and after his graduation. In Spring of 1967 Sullivan made his first trip to Europe; a five month long tour performing with the Donald McKayle Dance Company then toured briefly as Count Basie's lead trumpeter in 1970 and with Lonnie Liston Smith in 1971. In 1974 Sullivan released his first album as bandleader titled Genesis. The album was entirely arraigned, composed, and produced by Sullivan. Throughout most of Sullivan's career he has worked intermittently on many Broadway productions and with orchestras.

== Discography ==
=== As leader ===
- Genesis (1974, Strata-East)
- Re-Entry (1976, Whynot)
- Kamau (1995, Arabesque)
- Jam Session Vol. 11 (2004, SteepleChase)

=== As sideman ===
With Kenny Barron

- Lucifer (Muse, 1975)

With Walter Bishop, Jr.

- Illumination (1977)

With Betty Carter

- The Music Never Stops (Blue Engine, 2019)

With Ricky Ford

- Loxodonta Africana (New World, 1977)

With Sonny Fortune

- Long Before Our Mothers Cried (Strata-East, 1974)
- Awakening (Horizon, 1975)
- Waves of Dreams (Horizon, 1976)

With Carlos Garnett

- Black Love (Muse, 1974)

With Yusef Lateef

- Part of the Search (Atlantic, 1973)

With Jimmy Owens

- Headin' Home (A&M/Horizon, 1978)

With Sam Rivers

- Crystals (Impulse!, 1973)

With Roswell Rudd

- Numatik Swing Band (1973)

With Woody Shaw

- Woody III (Columbia, 1979)

With McCoy Tyner

- 13th House (Milestone, 1981)
- Uptown/Downtown (Milestone, 1988)
- The Turning Point (1991)
