= Genesis (Charles Sullivan album) =

Studio album by Charles Sullivan
- Released: 1974
- Recorded: June 20 & 21 and July 24, 1974
- Studio: Sound Ideas, N.Y.C., and Minot Studio, White Plains, N.Y.
- Genre: Jazz
- Label: Strata-East; SES 7413
- Producer: Charles Sullivan

Charles Sullivan chronology
Genesis (1974)	Re-Entry (1975)

Genesis is the debut album by American trumpeter Charles Sullivan recorded in 1974 and released on the Strata-East label.

== Reception ==
The Allmusic review by Michael G. Nastos awarded the album 5 stating "it's well deserving of this accolade as one of the very best post-bop efforts of its decade". The Rolling Stone Jazz Record Guide said "Every track is a winner with Charles Sullivan proving himself an outstanding composer and small-group arranger".

Professional ratings
Review scores
Source	Rating
Allmusic	5/5 stars
The Rolling Stone Jazz Record Guide	4/5 stars

== Track listing ==
All compositions by Charles Sullivan

1. "Evening Song" – 8:22
2. "Good-Bye Sweet John (In Memory of John Foster: Pianist)" – 5:50
3. "Field Holler" – 3:51
4. "Now I'll Sleep" – 4:32
5. "Genesis" – 17:27

== Personnel ==
- Charles Sullivan – trumpet
- Sonny Fortune – alto saxophone
- Stanley Cowell, Onaje Allan Gumbs – piano
- Sharon Freeman – electric piano
- Alex Blake – bass
- Billy Hart – drums
- Lawrence Killian – congas, percussion
- Dee Dee Bridgewater – vocals
