= Chip Jackson =

American jazz double bass player

Chip Jackson is an American jazz double bass player. He has played in trios with Billy Taylor and Elvin Jones.

== Discography ==
With Al Di Meola

- Soaring Through a Dream (Manhattan, 1985)

With Teddy Edwards

- Ladies Man (HighNote, 2000)

With Danny Gottlieb

- Whirlwind (Atlantic, 1989)

With Elvin Jones

- Live at the Village Vanguard Volume One (Landmark, 1984)
- In Europe (Enja, 1991)

With Jack Walrath

- Wholly Trinity (Muse, 1986 [1988])
- With Joe Beck The Journey(DMP 1991)

With Chuck Mangione "Bellavia" (UMG Recordings, Inc. 1975)
