= Out of the Tradition =

Studio album by Jack Walrath and The Masters of Suspense
- Released: 1992
- Recorded: May 7, 1990
- Studio: Van Gelder Studio, Englewood Cliffs, NJ
- Genre: Jazz
- Length: 58:46
- Label: Muse; MCD 5403
- Producer: Don Sickler

Jack Walrath chronology
Neohippus (1988)	Out of the Tradition (1992)	Gut Feelings (1990)

Out of the Tradition is an album by trumpeter Jack Walrath which was recorded in 1990 and released on the Muse label in 1992.

Professional ratings
Review scores
Source	Rating
AllMusic	4/5 stars

== Track listing ==
1. "Clear Out of This World" (Jimmy McHugh, Al Dubin) – 9:22
2. "So Long Eric" (Charles Mingus) – 7:11
3. "Stardust" (Hoagy Carmichael, Mitchell Parish) –6:46
4. "Wake Up and Wash It Off!" (Jack Walrath) – 7:12
5. "Come Sunday" (Duke Ellington) – 7:11
6. "Brother, Can You Spare a Dime?" (Jay Gorney, Yip Harburg) – 7:43
7. "Cabin in the Sky" (Vernon Duke, John La Touche) – 7:24
8. "I'm Getting Sentimental Over You" (George Bassman, Ned Washington) – 5:57

== Personnel ==
- Jack Walrath – trumpet
- Larry Coryell – guitar
- Benny Green – piano
- Anthony Cox – bass
- Ronnie Burrage – drums
