= Master of Suspense (album) =

Studio album by Jack Walrath
- Released: 1987
- Recorded: September 19, 1986, and June 9, 1987
- Studio: Sound Ideas Studios, NYC and Pedernales Studio, Spicewood, TX
- Genre: Jazz
- Length: 44:12
- Label: Blue Note; BLJ-46905
- Producer: Jack Walrath

Jack Walrath chronology
Wholly Trinity (1986)	Master of Suspense (1987)	Neohippus (1988)

Master of Suspense is an album by trumpeter Jack Walrath which was recorded in 1986 and released on the revamped Blue Note label.

== Reception ==
Professional ratings
Review scores
Source	Rating
AllMusic	4/5 stars

The AllMusic review by Scott Yanow stated "The biggest news of this CD by trumpeter Jack Walrath is that Willie Nelson sings and plays guitar on two numbers: "I'm Sending You a Big Bouquet of Roses" and "I'm So Lonesome I Could Cry." The other selections feature Walrath (who composed all but the two Nelson features) with a larger group than normal; a septet ... As usual Walrath's music stretches the boundaries of hard bop without tossing away its roots". The album was nominated for a Grammy.

== Track listing ==
All compositions by Jack Walrath except where noted

1. "Meat!" – 4:02
2. "Children" – 5:18
3. "No Mystery" – 5:58
4. "A Study in Porcine" – 4:48
5. "I'm Sending You a Big Bouquet of Roses" (Steve Nelson, Bob Hilliard) – 3:50
6. "The Lord's Calypso" – 3:08
7. "I'm So Lonesome I Could Cry" (Hank Williams) – 9:05
8. "Monk on the Moon" – 5:26
9. "A Hymn for the Discontented" – 6:32

== Personnel ==
- Jack Walrath – trumpet, flugelhorn
- Steve Turre – trombone
- Kenny Garrett – alto saxophone
- Carter Jefferson – tenor saxophone
- James Williams – piano
- Anthony Cox – bass
- Ronnie Burrage – drums
- Willie Nelson – guitar, vocals (tracks 5 & 7)
