= Gut Feelings (album) =

Live album by Jack Walrath and Masters of Suspense
- Released: 1991
- Recorded: September 10, 1990
- Venue: Merkin Concert Hall, NYC
- Genre: Jazz
- Length: 69:02
- Label: Muse; MCD 5422
- Producer: Don Sickler

Jack Walrath chronology
Out of the Tradition (1990)	Gut Feelings (1991)	Portraits in Ivory and Brass (1992)

Gut Feelings is a live album by trumpeter Jack Walrath which was recorded at the Merkin Concert Hall in 1990 and released on the Muse label in 1991.

== Reception ==
Professional ratings
Review scores
Source	Rating
AllMusic	4/5 stars
DownBeat	3.5/5 stars

The AllMusic review by Scott Yanow stated "Walrath's current group. Carter Jefferson (ts), Anthony Cox (b) are prime players". The DownBeat reviewer indicated that Walrath was partially successful in the album's "blending of jazz and classical elements".

== Track listing ==
All compositions by Jack Walrath except where noted

1. "The Serpent's Kiss" – 15:36
2. "Jump Monk" (Charles Mingus) – 10:56
3. "Adagio For Strings And Organ" (Tomaso Albinoni, Remo Giazotto) – 9:01
4. "Gagaku (4th movement of Sept Haikai)" (Olivier Messiaen) – 7:06
5. "Blues in the Guts" – 9:07
6. "Faith" – 17:56

== Personnel ==
- Jack Walrath – trumpet
- Carter Jefferson – tenor saxophone, soprano saxophone
- Michael Cochrane – piano
- Anthony Cox – bass
- Ronnie Burrage – drums
- Hiraga Strings:
  - Amy Higara – violin, concertmaster
  - Charles Baker, Bob Shaw, Peter Winograd – violin
  - Maria Lambros Kannen, David Cerutti – viola
  - Peter Wyrick, Peter Sanders – cello
  - Don Sickler - conductor
