= Bang On! =

Studio album by Billy Bang
- Released: 1997
- Recorded: April 21 and 23, 1997
- Studio: Sound on Sound Studios, New York City
- Genre: Jazz
- Length: 1:01:31
- Label: Justin Time; JUST 105-2
- Producer: Billy Bang, Ronnie Burrage

Billy Bang chronology
Forbidden Planet (1997)	Bang On! (1997)	Commandment (For the Sculpture of Alain Kirili) (1997)

Bang On! is an album by violinist Billy Bang. It was recorded on April 21 and 23, 1997, at Sound on Sound Studios in New York City, and was released later that year by Justin Time Records. On the album, which features a blend of jazz standards and original compositions, Bang is joined by pianist D. D. Jackson, double bassist Akira Ando, and drummer Ronnie Burrage.

== Reception ==
Professional ratings
Review scores
Source	Rating
AllMusic	4.5/5 stars
The Penguin Guide to Jazz	4/4 stars
The Rolling Stone Jazz & Blues Album Guide	3.5/5 stars
Tom Hull – on the Web	A−
The Virgin Encyclopedia of Jazz	4/5 stars

In a review for AllMusic, Michael G. Nastos stated that the album "shows [Bang] balancing music both inside and out," and wrote: "This is Billy Bang's finest recorded hour -- a hallmark for modern jazz violin in the 1990s, and a strong candidate for best jazz CD of 1997."

The authors of The Penguin Guide to Jazz Recordings awarded the album a full 4 stars, calling it "a complete surprise," and "by far the straightest and most mainstream sound Bang has ever committed to record." They described Jackson as "superb," while Barrage "deserves to be better known."

Writing for JazzTimes, Fred Bouchard noted that Bang "can and does find the center of notes... whether he plucks the strings, pulls down long whinnying glissandi, or wails wide tremolos, or attacks single notes in a line," and praised "the persistent buoyancy" of Jackson, Ando, and Burrage.

== Track listing ==
1. "Bama Swing" (Billy Bang) – 6:42
2. "Sweet Georgia Brown" (Ben Bernie, Maceo Pinkard, Kenneth Casey) – 5:07
3. "Peaceful Dreams" (Billy Bang) – 6:04
4. "Spirits Entering" (Billy Bang) – 9:10
5. "They Plan" (Sun Ra) – 4:30
6. "Three Faces of Eve" (Billy Bang) – 4:59
7. "Yesterdays" (Jerome Kern, Otto Harbach) – 5:21
8. "Don's Dream" (Billy Bang) – 6:19
9. "Willow Weep for Me" (Ann Ronell) – 7:10
10. "Mr. Syms" (John Coltrane) – 6:45

== Personnel ==
- Billy Bang – violin
- D. D. Jackson – piano
- Akira Ando – double bass
- Ronnie Burrage – drums
