= Neohippus =

Studio album by Jack Walrath
- Released: 1989
- Recorded: August 19 and 21, 1988
- Studio: A&R Recording, NYC
- Genre: Jazz
- Length: 50:37
- Label: Blue Note; B1-91101
- Producer: Jack Walrath

Jack Walrath chronology
Master of Suspense (1986)	Neohippus (1989)	Out of the Tradition (1990)

Neohippus is an album by trumpeter Jack Walrath. It was recorded in 1988 and released on the Blue Note label.

== Reception ==
Professional ratings
Review scores
Source	Rating
AllMusic	4/5 stars

The AllMusic review by Scott Yanow stated that "Trumpeter Jack Walrath's music by the mid-'80s tended to play off of the melodies of tunes and their moods rather than merely following chord changes and predictable patterns. ... Although somewhat overlooked, Jack Walrath is always well worth checking out for he avoids the obvious and his music is full of surprise."

== Track listing ==
All compositions by Jack Walrath

1. "Village of the Darned" – 6:40
2. "Watch Your Head" – 6:41
3. "Fright Night" – 6:08
4. "Annie Lee" – 5:10
5. "England" – 3:46
6. "Beer!" – 7:50

== Personnel ==
- Jack Walrath – trumpet
- Carter Jefferson – tenor saxophone, clarinet
- John Abercrombie – guitar
- James Williams – piano
- Anthony Cox – bass
- Ronnie Burrage – drums
