= Big Bang Theory (Billy Bang album) =

Studio album by Billy Bang
- Released: 2000
- Recorded: August 20 and 21, 1999
- Studio: Sound on Sound Studios, New York City
- Genre: Jazz
- Length: 1:06:31
- Label: Justin Time; JUST 135-2
- Producer: Billy Bang, Jim West

Billy Bang chronology
Commandment (For the Sculpture of Alain Kirili) (1997)	Big Bang Theory (2000)	Vietnam: The Aftermath (2001)

Big Bang Theory is an album by violinist Billy Bang. It was recorded on August 20 and 21, 1999, at Sound on Sound Studios in New York City, and was released in 2000 by Justin Time Records. On the album, Bang is joined by pianist Alexis T. Pope, double bassist Curtis Lundy, and drummer Codaryl Moffett.

== Reception ==
Professional ratings
Review scores
Source	Rating
AllMusic	3/5 stars
Tom Hull – on the Web	B+

In a review for AllMusic, Al Campbell stated that the musicians are "easily capable of improvisation while maintaining a cohesive balance," and noted the album's "overt statement of spirituality that borders on experimentation while maintaining conventional structures."

John Murph of JazzTimes called the group "a cohesive ensemble with clearly defined roles," and praised "Bang's bluesy, backwoods fiddling" as well as "Curtis Lundy's swaggering bass lines, Alexis Pope's sparkling piano accompaniment and Codaryl Moffett's swinging drumming."

A reviewer for All About Jazz wrote: "Bang is a violinist whose ideas truly seem to be spur-of-the-moment as inspiration radiates, sometimes with physical embellishments, from his instrument to his audiences... the rhythm section of Big Bang Theory allows Bang to shine as the leader, laying down beats and holding back accompaniment, until it's time to step forth."

JazzWord's Ken Waxman called the album "exemplary," and commented: "CDs like this one... show that among his many other attributes, versatile Bang can output pure swing when he sets his bow to it... In fact, the careful listener would note that this quartet's heartfelt rhythm and relaxed tunefulness, call up the image of no one more than trickster Stuff Smith — mainstream jazz's violin clown prince of the 1930s to 1960s."

== Track listing ==
1. "Contrary Motion" (Kahil El'Zabar) – 5:16
2. "At Play in the Fields of the Lord" (Billy Bang) – 7:34
3. "Big Bang Theory" (Curtis Lundy) – 9:49
4. "Theme for Taraby" (Billy Bang) – 6:03
5. "Silent Observation" (Billy Bang) – 7:21
6. "One for Jazz (For Dennis Charles)" (Billy Bang) – 4:31
7. "Sweet Irene" (Billy Bang) – 6:16
8. "Swing Low, Sweet Chariot" (Traditional) – 2:22
9. "Saved by the Bell" (Alexis Pope) – 5:41
10. "Little Sunflower" (Freddie Hubbard) – 10:50

== Personnel ==
- Billy Bang – violin
- Alexis T. Pope – piano
- Curtis Lundy – double bass
- Codaryl Moffett – drums
