= Long Before Our Mothers Cried =

Studio album by Sonny Fortune
- Released: 1974
- Recorded: September 8 & September 15, 1974 at Minot Studio, White Plains, N.Y.
- Genre: Jazz
- Label: Strata-East; SES 7423
- Producer: Sonny Fortune

Sonny Fortune chronology
Trip on the Strip (1966)	Long Before Our Mothers Cried (1974)	Awakening (1975)

Long Before Our Mothers Cried is an album by American saxophonist Sonny Fortune recorded in 1974 and released on the Strata-East label.

== Reception ==
In The Village Voice, Robert Christgau gave Long Before Our Mothers Cried a "B+" and admired Fortune's "commitment to plain good music", spanning bebop to free jazz styles, and wrote of the album, "despite even the bracing piano comps of Stanley Cowell, there's nothing compelling here. But satisfying." Michael G. Nastos of AllMusic gave it three out of five stars, calling it "a fully realized creative album and very listenable as well".

== Track listing ==
All compositions by Sonny Fortune

1. "Long Before Our Mothers Cried" - 14:25
2. "A Tribute to a Holiday (Billie)" - 5:51
3. "Sound of Silents" - 8:41
4. "Five for Trane" - 6:26
5. "Wayneish" - 6:37

== Personnel ==
- Sonny Fortune - alto saxophone, soprano saxophone, flute
- Charles Sullivan - trumpet
- Stanley Cowell - piano, electric piano
- Wayne Dockery - bass
- Chip Lyle - drums
- Mario Muñoz - bass drum, timbales
- Angel Allende - congas, triangle, tambourine
- Richie Pablo Landrum - percussion
