= Jack Walrath Quintet at Umbria Jazz Festival, Vol. 2 =

Live album by Jack Walrath Quintet
- Released: 1985
- Recorded: July 18, 1983
- Venue: Umbria Jazz Festival, Perugia, Italy
- Genre: Jazz
- Length: 53:55
- Label: Red; VPA 186
- Producer: Alberto Alberti, Sergio Veschi

Jack Walrath chronology
Jack Walrath Quintet at Umbria Jazz Festival, Vol. 1 (1983)	Jack Walrath Quintet at Umbria Jazz Festival, Vol. 2 (1985)	Killer Bunnies (1986)

Jack Walrath Quintet at Umbria Jazz Festival, Vol. 2 is a live album by trumpeter Jack Walrath which was recorded at the Umbria Jazz Festival in 1983, and released on the Italian Red label in 1985.

== Reception ==
Professional ratings
Review scores
Source	Rating
AllMusic	4/5 stars

The AllMusic review by Scott Yanow stated, "The second of two albums recorded by trumpeter Jack Walrath's quintet is at the same level as the first. The music is well-played and adventurous but does not stick in one's mind afterwards; in general it is easier to respect than to love, making this series of greater interest to Jack Walrath completists rather than more general listeners".

== Track listing ==
All compositions by Jack Walrath

1. "Feel No Evil" – 16:50
2. "A Plea for Sanity" – 11:30
3. "Inchen" – 15:00
4. "Mucene the Genii" – 10:35

== Personnel ==
- Jack Walrath – trumpet
- Glenn Ferris – trombone
- Michael Cochrane – piano
- Anthony Cox – bass
- Mike Clark – drums
