= Jack Walrath Quintet at Umbria Jazz Festival, Vol. 1 =

Live album by Jack Walrath Quintet
- Released: 1985
- Recorded: July 18, 1983
- Venue: Umbria Jazz Festival, Perugia, Italy
- Genre: Jazz
- Length: 47:40
- Label: Red; VPA 182
- Producer: Alberto Alberti, Sergio Veschi

Jack Walrath chronology
| A Plea for Sanity (1982) | Jack Walrath Quintet at Umbria Jazz Festival, Vol. 1 (1985) | Jack Walrath Quintet at Umbria Jazz Festival, Vol. 2 (1983) |

Jack Walrath Quintet at Umbria Jazz Festival, Vol. 1 is a live album by trumpeter Jack Walrath which was recorded at the Umbria Jazz Festival in 1983 and released on the Italian Red label in 1985.

== Reception ==
Professional ratings
Review scores
| Source | Rating |
|---|---|
| AllMusic | 3/5 stars |

The AllMusic review by Scott Yanow stated "The playing is excellent but little all that memorable actually occurs on this worthwhile but average postbop set".

== Track listing ==
All compositions by Jack Walrath

1. "Two In One" – 11:35
2. "Blue Moves" – 9:05
3. "John Agar" – 27:00

== Personnel ==
- Jack Walrath – trumpet
- Glenn Ferris – trombone
- Michael Cochrane – piano
- Anthony Cox – bass
- Mike Clark – drums
