= Revenge of the Fat People =

Studio album by The Jack Walrath Group
- Released: 1982
- Recorded: May 23, 1981
- Studio: Madison, NYC
- Genre: Jazz
- Length: 39:07
- Label: Stash; ST-221
- Producer: Jack Walrath

Jack Walrath chronology
In Montana (1980)	Revenge of the Fat People (1982)	In Europe (1982)

Revenge of the Fat People is an album by trumpeter Jack Walrath, recorded in 1981 and released on the Stash label in 1982.

== Reception ==
Professional ratings
Review scores
Source	Rating
AllMusic	4/5 stars

The Globe and Mail wrote that Walrath's "music continues the filips that characterized the Mingus bands, the playful tempos, the gospel roots, the passionate solos."

The AllMusic review by Scott Yanow stated: "This Stash LP is a strong effort by the adventurous trumpeter Jack Walrath who contributed four of the six compositions... The music is as colorful and as adventurous its the titles".

== Track listing ==
All compositions by Jack Walrath except where noted

1. "Revenge of the Fat People" – 5:10
2. "Duke Ellington's Sound of Love" (Charles Mingus) – 6:29
3. "Beer!" – 8:10
4. "Sliding Doors" (Michael Cochrane) – 7:58
5. "Piggy Love" – 4:42
6. "Blues in the Guts" – 6:38

== Personnel ==
- Jack Walrath – trumpet
- Ricky Ford – tenor saxophone
- Michael Cochrane – piano
- Cameron Brown – bass
- Mike Clark – drums
