= In Europe (Jack Walrath album) =

Live album by Jack Walrath Quintet
- Released: 1983
- Recorded: July 22, 1982
- Venue: Jazzhus Montmartre, Copenhagen, Denmark
- Genre: Jazz
- Length: 44:14
- Label: SteepleChase; SCS 1172
- Producer: Nils Winther

Jack Walrath chronology
Revenge of the Fat People (1981)	In Europe (1983)	A Plea for Sanity (1982)

In Europe is a live album by trumpeter Jack Walrath's Quintet. It was recorded at the Jazzhus Montmartre in 1982 and released on the SteepleChase label.

Professional ratings
Review scores
Source	Rating
AllMusic	3/5 stars
The Penguin Guide to Jazz Recordings	3.5/4 stars

== Track listing ==
All compositions by Jack Walrath

1. "Duesin' in Duesseldorf" – 17:26
2. "Where Have I Been Before" – 5:43
3. "At Home in Rome" – 13:44
4. "Reverend Red" – 7:21

== Personnel ==
- Jack Walrath – trumpet
- Glenn Ferris – trombone
- Michael Cochrane – piano
- Anthony Cox – bass
- Jimmy Madison – drums
