= From Now On (Sonny Fortune album) =

Studio album by Sonny Fortune
- Released: 1996
- Recorded: March 11 & 12, 1996
- Studio: Van Gelder, Englewood Cliffs, New Jersey
- Genre: Jazz
- Length: 68:56
- Label: Blue Note
- Producer: Marty Khan, Sonny Fortune

Sonny Fortune chronology
A Better Understanding (1995)	From Now On (1996)	In the Spirit of John Coltrane (1999)

From Now On is an album by saxophonist Sonny Fortune which was recorded in 1996 and released on the Blue Note label.

== Reception ==
Professional ratings
Review scores
Source	Rating
AllMusic	4/5 stars
All About Jazz	5/5 stars

The AllMusic review by Scott Yanow stated "This release from altoist Sonny Fortune is a particularly strong session, a mostly high-powered modal modern mainstream date with Fortune playing at his best and contributing five of the eight compositions ... For Sonny Fortune (who has been underrated throughout his career), this is a pretty definitive session". On All About Jazz, Florence Wetzell noted "It's a strong group and their mutual understanding is evident throughout ... Each horn gets copious solo space as does the elegant Hicks". Producer Marty Khan stated "It was one of the great privileges of my entire career as a producer. I produced over thirty albums...To me From Now On is the peak of all the albums I’ve worked on in my life without question."

== Track listing ==
All compositions by Sonny Fortune except where noted

1. "Glue Fingers" (Marcus Belgrave) – 9:53
2. "This Side of Infinity" (Larry Willis, Sonny Fortune) – 6:28
3. "From Now On" – 7:25
4. "Come In Out of the Rain" (Willis) – 10:18
5. "Suspension" – 7:07
6. "On Second and Fifth" – 5:24
7. "Gift of Love" (Rodgers Grant) – 5:23
8. "Thoughts" – 16:58

== Personnel ==
- Sonny Fortune – alto saxophone
- Eddie Henderson – trumpet (tracks 1, 3 & 8)
- Joe Lovano – tenor saxophone (tracks 1, 6, & 8)
- John Hicks – piano
- Santi Debriano – bass
- Jeff "Tain" Watts – drums
