= Alain Kirili =

French-American sculptor (1946–2021)

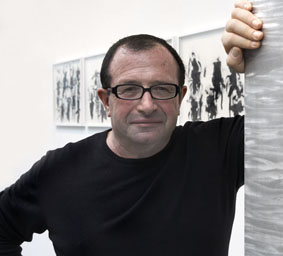
- Portrait of Alain Kirili, Musée de l'Orangerie, Paris
- Born: 29 August 1946; Paris, France
- Died: 19 May 2021 (aged 74); New York, U.S.
- Known for: sculpture

Alain Kirili (29 August 1946 – 19 May 2021) was a French-American sculptor. He was recognized for his post-minimalist abstract sculptures in forged iron and his large-scale public sculptures. His work has been the subject of numerous gallery and museum exhibitions in United States and Europe, and has received considerable critical interest from art historians, such as Thierry Dufrêne, Robert C. Morgan, Robert Rosenblum, and Kirk Varnedoe. Kirili lived and worked in Paris and New York.

== Early career ==
Alain Kirili was born in Paris. At the age of 19, during the course of his early artistic training, Kirili discovered David Smith's sculptures Cubi XVIII and Cubi XIX, exhibited at the Musée Rodin in Paris and was immediately inspired by the American sculptor's work. Kirili traveled to the United States that same year. During his stay, Kirili visited the major museum collections in New York, Washington, Baltimore, Philadelphia, Chicago, and Detroit, where he became interested in abstract expressionist painters. Barnett Newman became an especially influential figure to him.

In 1966 Kirili met the Korean painter Ungno Lee (1904-1989) in Paris. During this period, Kirili became part of the circle of intellectuals, writers. and visual artists around Roland Barthes, the avant-garde literary magazine Tel Quel Philippe Sollers, and Julia Kristeva. His first solo show was at Sonnabend Gallery in Paris in 1972. Among other works, this show included a floor piece (Untitled, 1972; cut zinc sheet) which already contained many of the elements that would characterize his future practice. This work is reproduced in the exhibition catalog, and accompanied with a text by the French poet and art critic Marcelin Pleynet. Ileana Sonnabend introduced Kirili to Robert Rauschenberg, whom he credited with introducing him to important personalities in the New York art scene. Kirili had several shows at Sonnabend Gallery in Paris and Geneva before his sculptures were first exhibited in New York in 1976 at the inaugural show of the Institute for Art and Urban Resources (now MoMA PS1) and at the Clocktower Gallery in Lower Manhattan.

In 1977, his sculpture was included in the Documenta VI in Kassel, Germany. That same year, he married the French photographer Ariane Lopez-Huici.

In 1978 while traveling in India for the first time, Kirili was inspired by the Hindu concept of Yoni / Lingam, a sculptural representation of the feminine (Yoni) and the masculine (Lingam) forming a symbolic union in the manner of base and sculpture in Kirili's work. In his article, Lingaistics published in Art in America in 1982, Kirili evoked more specifically the sexual and repetitive aspect of these abstract and highly symbolic religious objects.

Kirili's first solo show in New York (1978) was held at Sonnabend Gallery where he exhibited a series of forged iron sculptures.

In 1979, the Museum of Modern Art (MoMA) acquired one of his pieces (Indian Curve, 1976) for the first time, the acquisition coinciding with his move to New York.

== Oeuvre ==
=== Early sculpture in forged iron ===
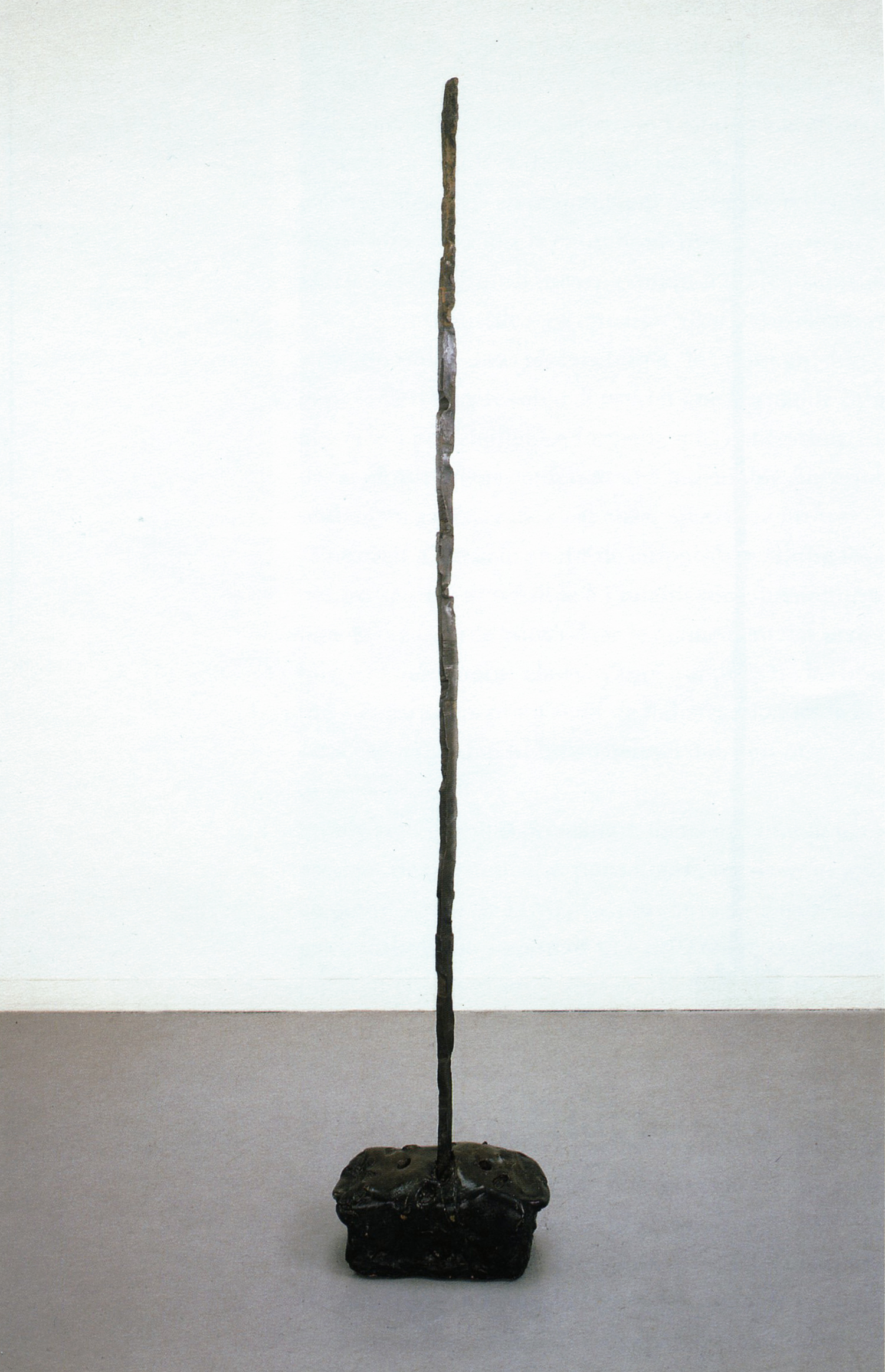
Messager (1976)

Messager, 1976, is one of Kirili's earliest forged iron pieces; it consists in a thinly shaped iron bar growing out of its base in modeled bronze. The tactile and spiritual quality of the sculpture distinguishes it from then-prevailing tendencies in Conceptual art. Art historian Robert Rosenblum perceived in this work a vertical force, familiar in the paintings of Barnett Newman, suggesting "a spiritually rather than materially assertive human presence".

The concept of verticality is indeed crucial in the context of Kirili's oeuvre. In an interview with art critic Philippe Piguet, Kirili addressed the importance he ascribed to the concepts of circumvolution and incarnation.

One of his early sculptures was shown at the Institute for Art and Urban Resources (now MoMA PS1) in 1976. Others, e.g. Untitled (1978) and Laocoon II (1978), both representative of this first series in forged iron, are now in the Nasher collection, Dallas, and the Fonds National d'art contemporain (FNAC), France, respectively. Other early Kirili sculptures such as Indian Curve (1976) explore the upward movement of a curved metal bar seeking support on a wall, as well as the potentials of a horizontal rather than vertical extension (e.g. Longevity, 1980).

Kirili once described his aesthetic as "organic simplicity" in the tradition of, but formally not attached to, minimalism and abstract expressionism. Indeed, his early sculptures are already concerned with tactility and gesture, emphasizing the active involvement of the artist's hand in the process of creation. Kirili embraced a process that is immediate, combining emotions, intuitions, and the subconscious, in a free improvisation with the material.

=== Commandement series ===
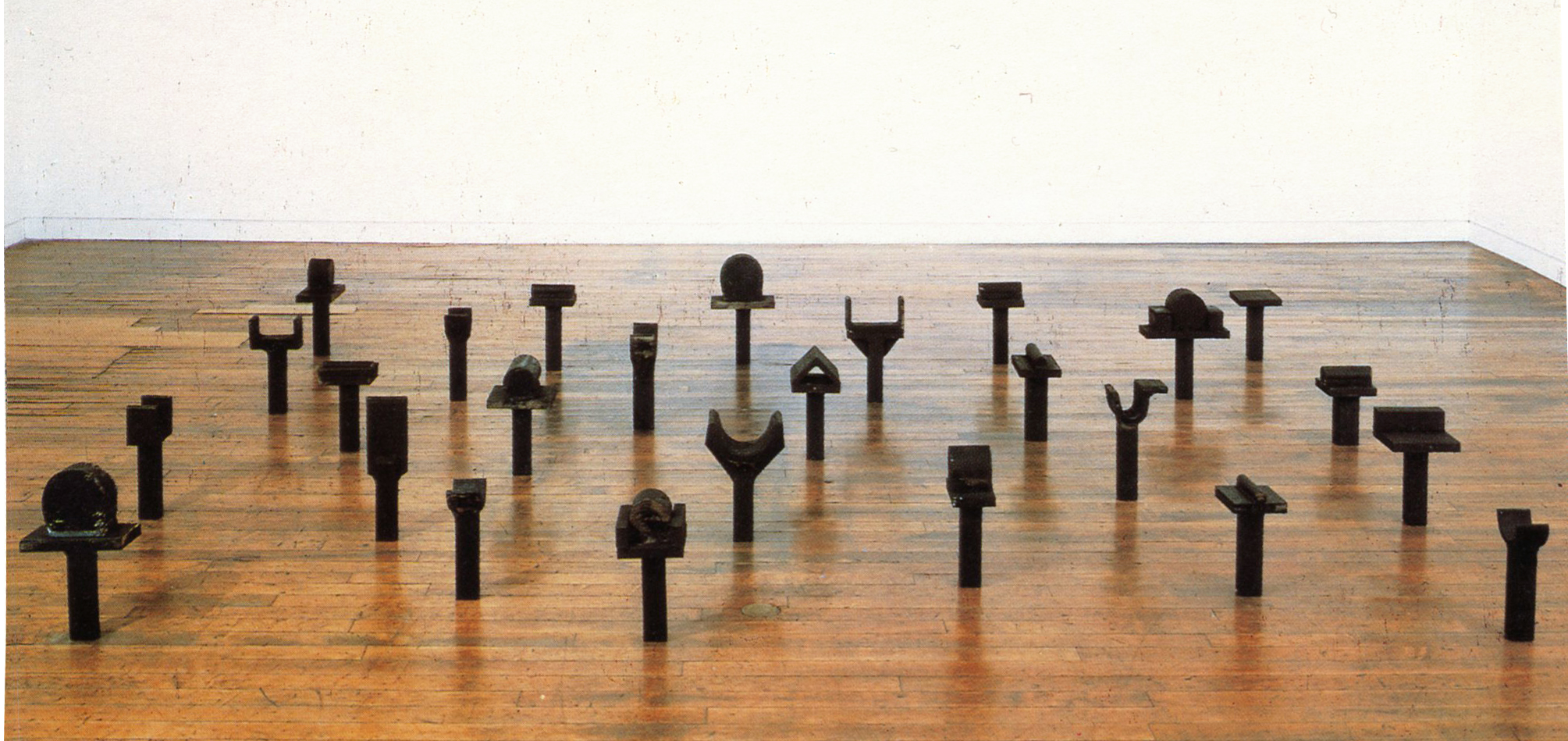
Commandement I (1980)

The Commandement series of sculptures is one of Kirili's most important and ongoing bodies of work. This series of distinct geometric forms, which art historians have described as "mystical fonts" and "abstract alphabets", rises 15 to 35 inches above the ground and individual examples are composed of up to 90 elements.

According to Kirili's statement, the title Commandement was inspired by a visit to the Jewish Museum in New York. He came across the word "Rimonim" and was told that, in Hebrew, it referred to the pomegranate fruit and, by extension, to the Commandments in the Torah, which are said to be as numerous as the seeds in a pomegranate. The forms of the elements in the Commandements series were influenced by his encounter, on New York City's Lower East Side, with the Torah calligraphers who trace their letters in the tradition of stone engravers. This series is concerned with the symbolic value of basic forms, and particularly with the world of glyphs, signs, and texts, in a way that evokes not only Kirili's fascination with ancient scripture, but also his ties to the Parisian milieu of writers and intellectuals such as Roland Barthes, Philippe Sollers, and Julia Kristeva".
In 1992, Soprano saxophonist Steve Lacy, performed in and amongst Kirili's Commandement at New York's Thread Waxing Space, launching an ongoing series of dialogues and collaborations between jazz musicians and Kirili's sculpture. Many of these improvisations, for example with Billy Bang, Thomas Buckner, Roy Campbell, Jr., Roy Haynes, Steve Lacy, Sunny Murray, William Parker, Joe McPhee, Cecil Taylor, among others, are documented in Celebrations published in 1997 by Christian Bourgois, Paris.

The earliest Commandements were created out of iron and either forged or cut with a torch. Kirili continued this series with a variety of materials, including styrofoam, painted iron, and pigmented concrete. Kirili first experimented with pigmented concrete in Commandement, à Claude Monet, which was shown at the Musée de l'Orangerie, Paris (2007) as part of the exhibition Kirili et les Nymphéas.
Rythmes d'Automne (2012), the most recent of the Commandements, was commissioned by the City of Paris and exhibited on the parvis of the Hôtel de Ville in the heart of Paris. Rythmes d'Automne with its different elements, cast in a grey, pigmented concrete, invites the public into its 6,500 square feet wide space of signs in order to play, converse, dance, or meditate.

=== A dialogue between variety and unity ===
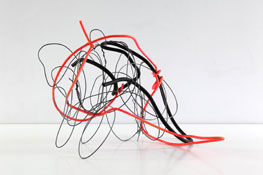
Aria (2012)

Kirili constantly pursued an interest in abstract modeling, which resulted over the years in the creation of an entire body of work in terra cotta. Art historian Kirk Varnedoe described these works as "heavily manipulated and often in rich fleshy tones, invested with more feminine form and with an altogether different energy", especially compared to his forged iron pieces. In 1978 Kirili began including iron elements and especially iron wire in the terra cotta pieces (Adam, 1978). The first terra cotta series was presented in two consecutive exhibitions, along with Kirili's forged iron pieces, at Galerie Maeght in Paris in 1984 and 1985, including the series Ivresse, now in the collection of the Centre Georges Pompidou.

In 1985 Kirili was invited to exhibit at the Musée Rodin. Kirili was drawn to the intense physicality and eroticism in Rodin's oeuvre, as these forces resonate in a more abstract manner in Kirili's own work. Kirili also wrote about Rodin's erotic drawings in "Rodin, Dessins érotiques", published by Editions Gallimard in 1987. Nudity (1985), modeled in clay and cast in bronze, was created for this show and is Kirili's first monumental (almost 7 feet tall) bronze. Its surface is densely modeled and insistently abstract, but nonetheless displays the "pleasure of rendering human flesh" as art historian Paula Rand Hornbostel put it.

Kirili simultaneously presented a group of new "sculptures-tables", table like sculptures, entitled Générations. Initiated in 1984, Générations as Kirk Varnedoe suggested "brings together a complex array of individual smaller sculptures – pieces from the 'Commandment' series, and forged-iron works of various scales" in an approach of "formal unity". Générations with their "lively tempo and bright openness" explore a dialogue between heterogeneous forms and media, between variety and unity.

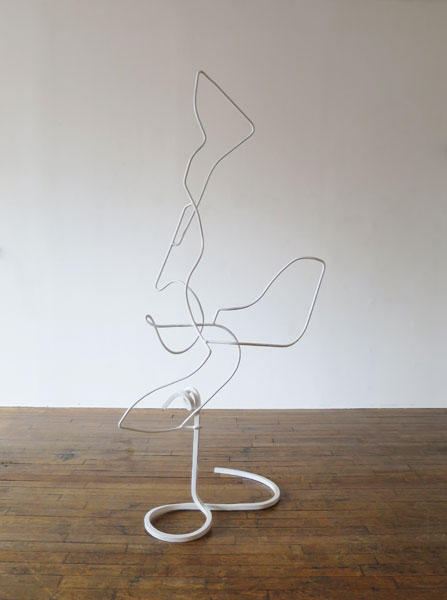
forged iron painted white 88 x 45 in

Kirili's innovative use of different materials led him eventually, in 1986, to experiment with aluminum. While applying a torch to the aluminum, Kirili discovered the material's explosive reaction. This explosion, which resembled a floral mechanism, was perceived by Kirili as a very expressionistic and emotional sign, which emerged from the regularity of the vertical. Art critic Philippe Dagen emphasized the "velvetiness and metallicness" of these aluminum pieces in his essay for the catalog of Kirili's solo exhibition at the Musée d'art moderne de Sainte-Etienne where he presented several of these sculptures, e.g. King I (1986) and Symphonie des Psaumes (1988).

From 2008 on, Kirili devoted himself to the creation of several series of organic wire sculptures, with partial rubber inclusions, in different colors, which he conceptualized as three-dimensional drawings. The process of creation is based on velocity and free improvisation, similar to Kirili's technique of modeling clay. His series Aria (2012) was created between his studios in New York and Paris, and exhibited along with Hans Hartung's late paintings and a select number of Hartung's sculptures. This show was presented in two parts, at the Foundation Hartung Bergman and the Musée Picasso (Antibes) in 2012/2013.

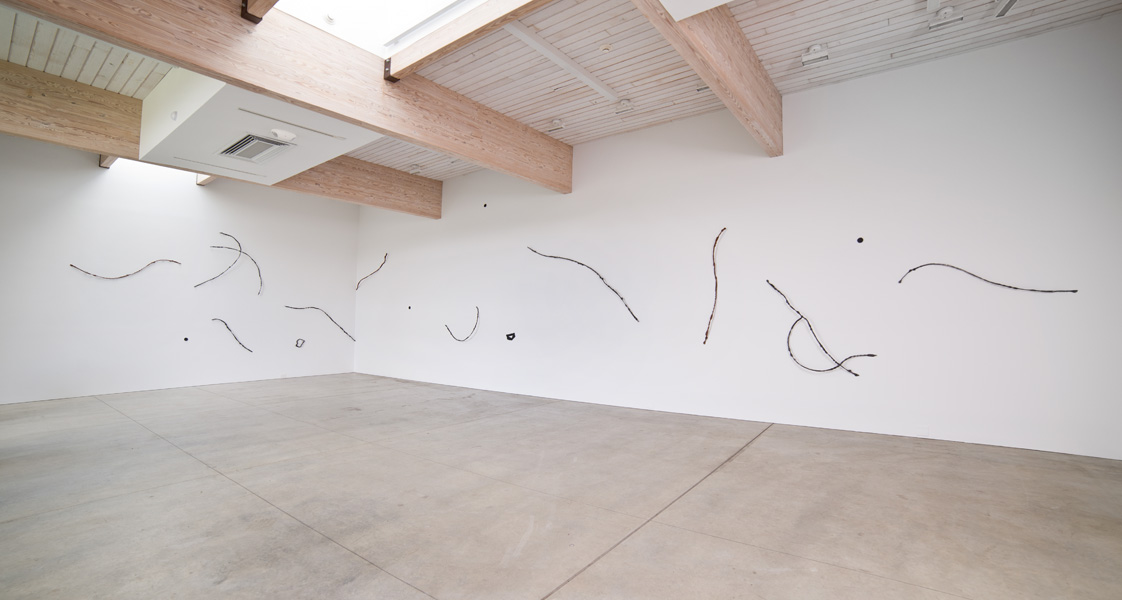
Art OMI International Arts Centerforged iron on 58 ft wall

"The Wave" (2015) exhibited at Art OMI International Arts Center in Ghent, New York (2015) is part of Alain Kirili's series on iron calligraphy: forged iron elements on a wall spanning 58 feet. Art scribe David Cohen stated "In Kirili's notion of three-dimensional calligraphy, language and the body are one."

Alain Kirili exhibited plaster sculptures as part of "Rodin: The Centennial" at the Grand Palais in Paris, France (2016).

=== Large-scale Public sculpture ===
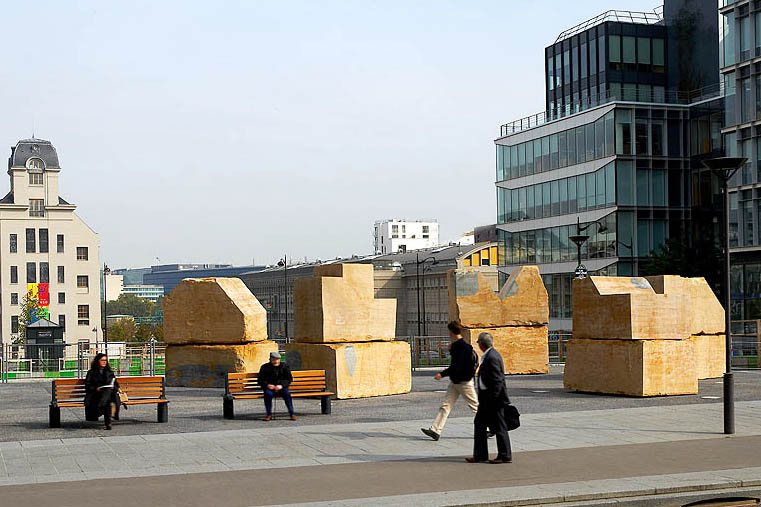
Hommage à Charlie Parker (2007)

Art historian Kirk Varnedoe pointed out that "Scale is of crucial concern to Kirili, and a general tendency toward greater scale has (like a growing interest in the special conditions of outdoor sculpture) been characteristic of his recent work."
Kirili considered Grand Commandement Blanc (1986; Tuileries Garden, Paris) as his first large-scale public sculpture. In 1992, he initiated a series of large-scale limestone sculptures of which Résistance (2011) is among his last . The title was inspired by a maxim of the French Resistance which he adopted: "Creation is an act of resistance and resistance is an act of creation". Commissioned by the city of Grenoble, Résistance is composed of seven binary elements of giant Burgundy limestone blocks. Each element is approximately 8 ^{1}/_{2} feet tall and 5 by and 3 ^{1}/_{2} feet wide. Two other similar sculptures, both commissions, are permanently installed in France: Improvisation (Tellem), 2000, in Dijon (campus of the University of Burgundy) and Hommage à Charlie Parker, 2007, in Paris (Avenue de France).
Art historian Thierry Dufrêne characterized this series as "giant drippings" because of their scale, spontaneity and rapid on-site installation, which is accomplished without any preliminary drawings. The gesture is monumental, spontaneous, free, and rapid.

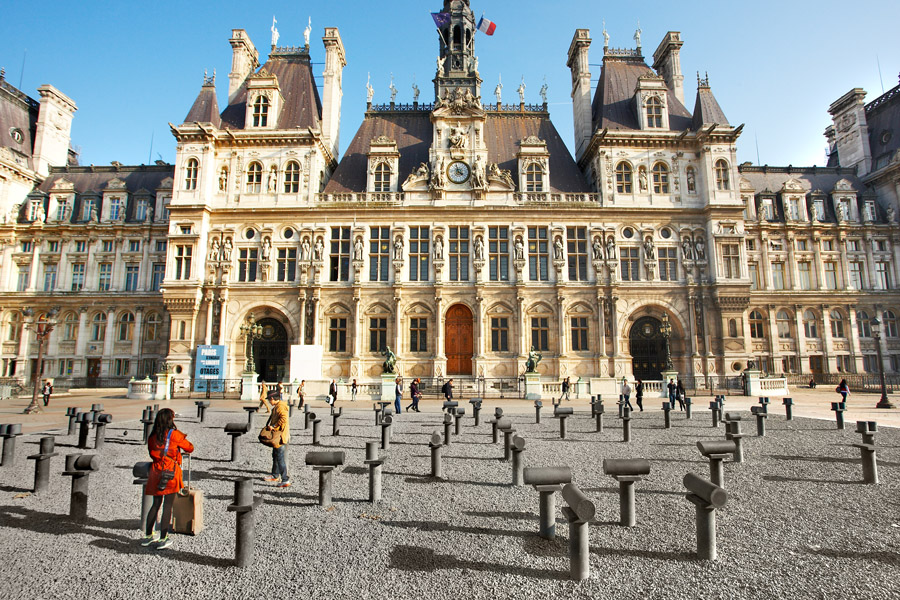
Rythmes d'Automne (2012)

"Rythmes d'automne (2012) is the latest work in the Commandements series which Kirili began in 1979-80. The series is based on an open form that, over the course of time, has become one of the most fruitful in Kirili's oeuvre. Kirili reminds us that his first Commandements corresponded to his arrival in New York in 1979, when he dreamed of inscribing himself in the family of great abstract artists such as Jackson Pollock - to whom he renders homage with this new piece in front of Hôtel de Ville of Paris-or Barnett Newman." – Thierry Dufrêne

=== Exhibitions (selection) ===
Kirili's work has been exhibited widely in America and Europe. His sculptures have been presented in numerous museum exhibitions, including at the Institute of Art and Urban Resources, PS1 (1976), Museum Haus Lange, Krefeld (1978), Dallas Museum of Art, Dallas (1981), Frankfurter Kunstverein, Francfort (1982), Musée Rodin, Paris (1985), Brooklyn Museum, New York (1991), Musée de Grenoble (retrospective, 1999), IVAM, Valencia (2003), Musée d'Orsay, Paris (2006), Musée de l'Orangerie, Paris (2007), Musée des Beaux-Arts de Caen (2013), La Cohue, musée de Vannes, France (2014), and Le Grand Palais, Paris, France (2016).
He also exhibited in private galleries, including; Sonnabend Gallery Paris, Geneva, New York (1972-1982), Galerie Beyeler, Basel (1980), Galerie Adrien Maeght, Paris (1984, 1985), Holly Solomon Gallery, New York (1987, 1990), Galerie Templon, Paris (1989-1996), Marlborough Gallery, New York (1998-2000), Galerie Akira Ikeda, New York, Berlin, Tokyo (2012, 2014), Galerie Pièce Unique, Paris (2013), and Hionas Gallery on the Lower East Side in New York City (2016).
Besides several of these shows having been conceived as dialogues with historical artists (e.g. Jean-Baptiste Carpeaux, Auguste Rodin, Claude Monet, among others), his work has also been exhibited in group or two person shows with more contemporary artists, notably Larry Bell, John Chamberlain, Ron Gorchov, Mark di Suvero, Richard Serra, Joel Shapiro, and Frank Stella.

== Image gallery ==
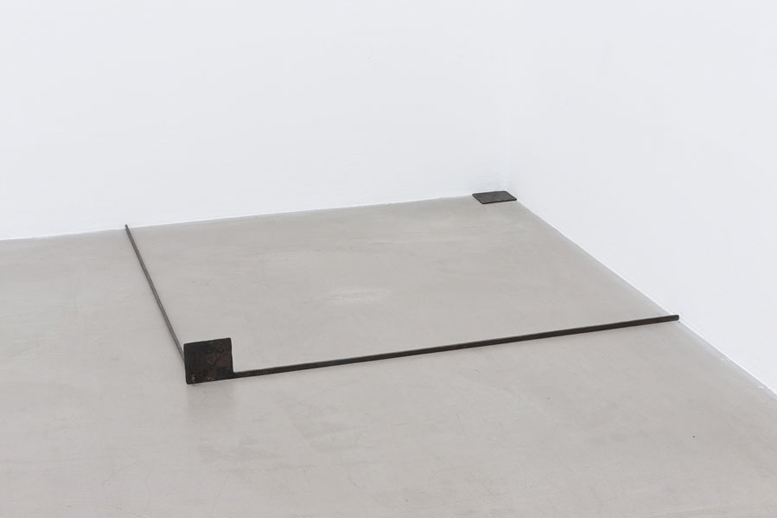
Sans titre (1976)

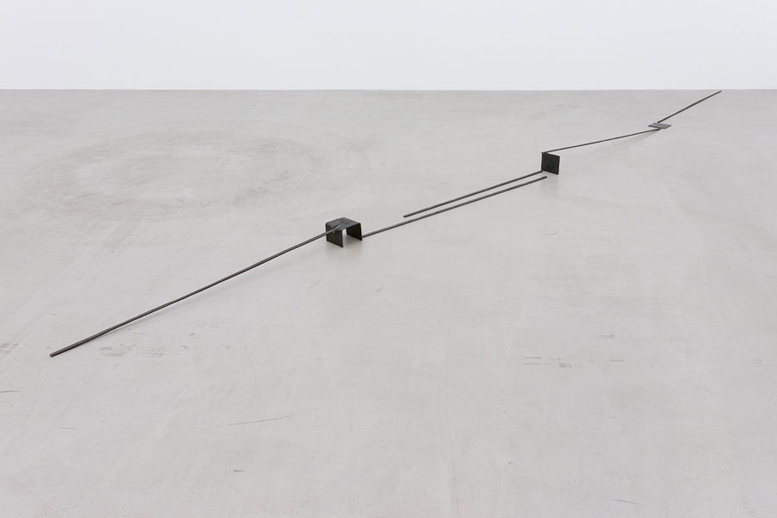
Sans titre (1977)

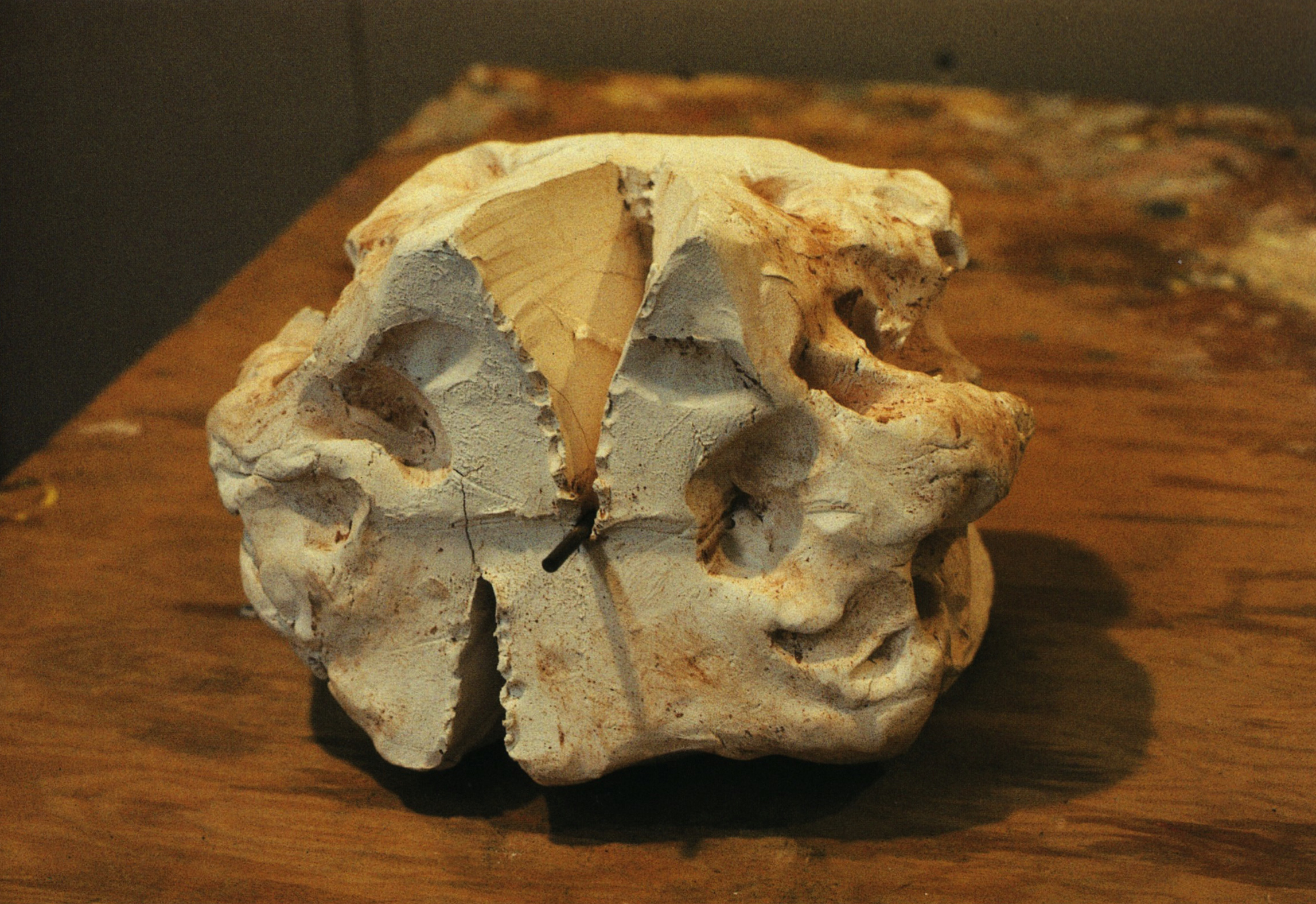
Adam (1978)

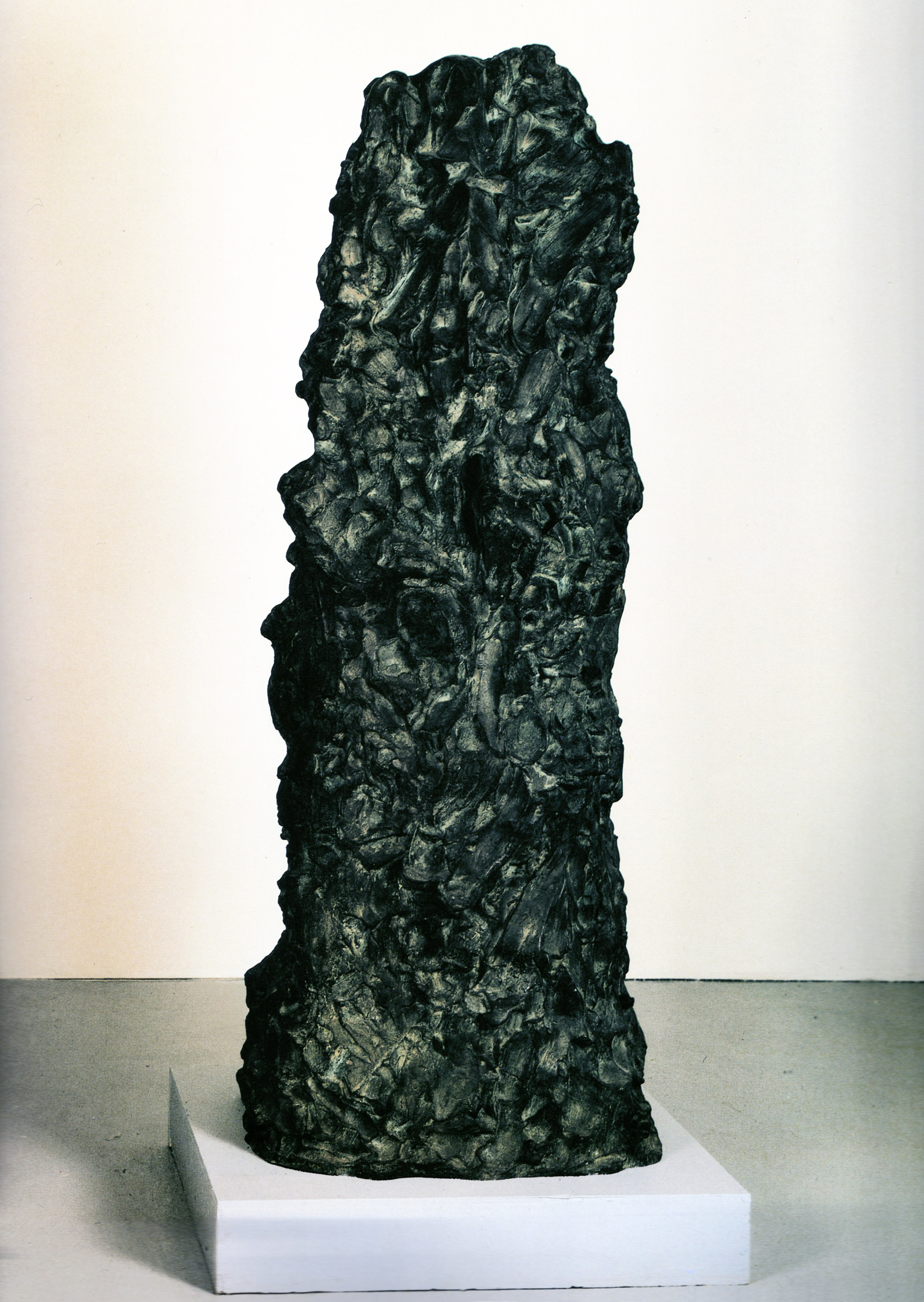
Nudité (1985)

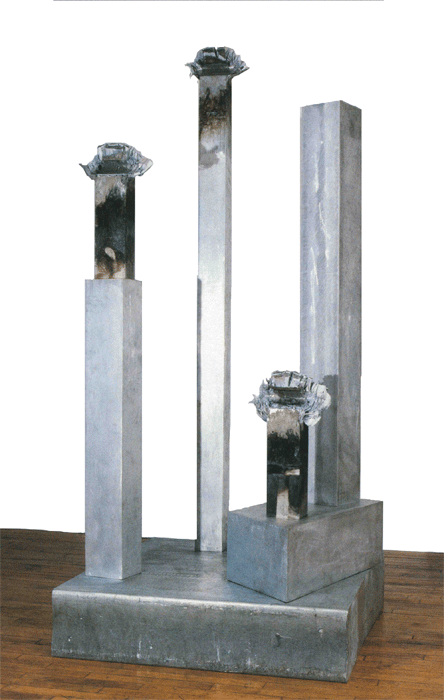
Symphonie (1988)

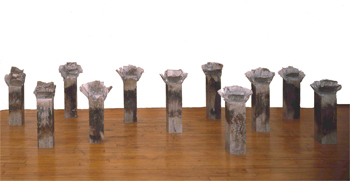
Oratorio (1988)

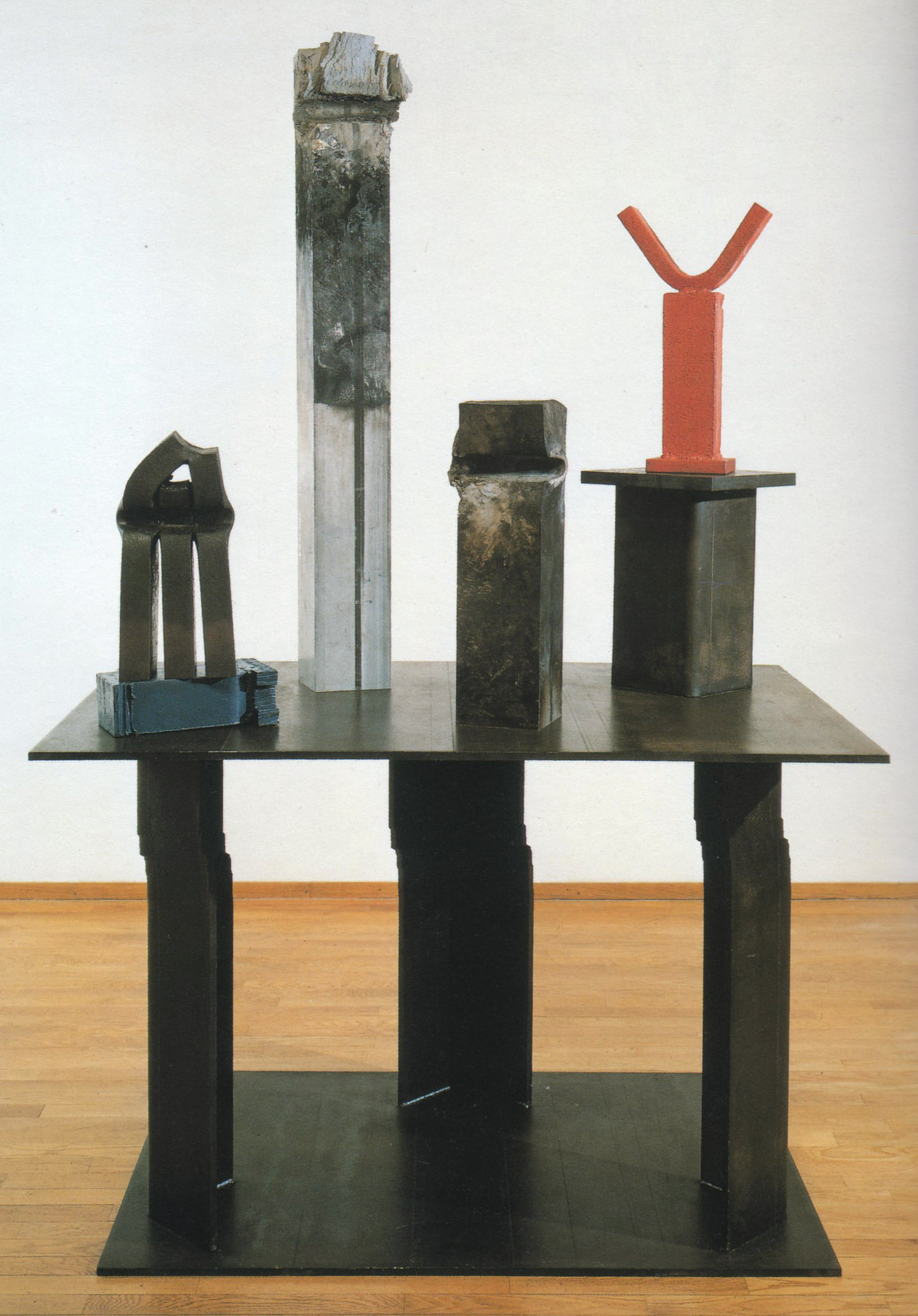
Générations (1989)

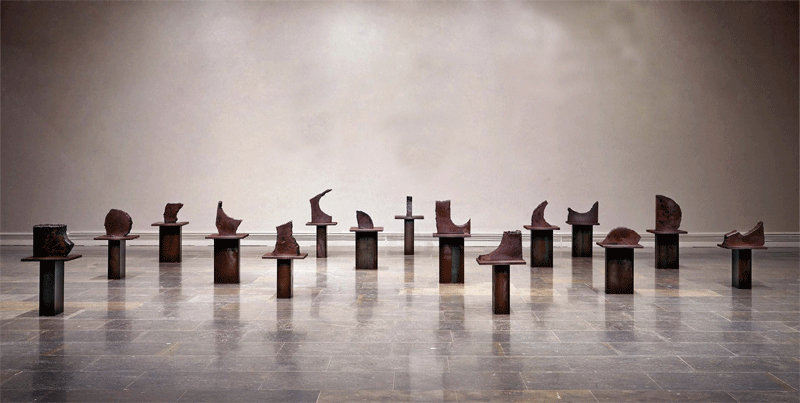
Commandement II (1991)

== Commissions ==
- 1986 Grand Commandement Blanc, Tuileries garden, Paris
- 1995 Black Sound, Art OMI, International Arts Center, Ghent, NY
- 1998 Water Letters, Musée de Grenoble, Grenoble
- 2000 Improvisation (Tellem), University of Burgundy, Dijon (permanently installed)
- 2002 Ascension, Abbaye de Montmajour, Arles
- 2007 Hommage à Charlie Parker, Avenue de France, Paris (permanently installed)
- 2011 Résistance, Grenoble (permanently installed)
- 2011 Geste de Résistance, Caen
- 2012 Rythmes d'Automne, Paris

== Collections (selection) ==
=== United States ===
- Museum of Modern Art (New York, NY)
- The Morgan Library & Museum (New York, NY)
- Jewish Museum (New York, NY)
- Albright, Knox Art Gallery (Buffalo, NY)
- Aldrich Museum of Contemporary Art (Ridgefield, CT)
- Vogel Collection, Museum of Art Rhode Island School of Design (Providence, RI)
- New Mexico Museum of Art (Santa Fe, NM)
- Dallas Museum of Art (Dallas, TX)
- Nasher Fondation (Dallas, TX).

=== France ===
- Centre Georges Pompidou / Musée National d'Art Moderne (Paris)
- Fonds National d'Art Contemporain (Paris)
- Fonds Régional d'Art Contemporain de Franche-Comté (Besançon)
- Fonds Régional d'Art Contemporain de Basse-Normandie (Caen)
- Fonds Régional d'Art Contemporain de Bretagne (Châteaugiron)
- Musée des Beaux-Arts (Angers)
- Musée Picasso (Antibes)
- Musée des Beaux-Arts (Caen)
- Musée de Grenoble (Grenoble)
- Musée d'Art Contemporain (Lyon)
- Musée d'Art Moderne (Sainte-Etienne)
- Musée des Beaux-Arts (Valenciennes)

=== Germany ===
- Lehmbruck Museum (Duisburg)
- Museum Ludwig (Cologne)

=== Spain ===
- Institut Valencià d'Art Modern, IVAM (Valencia).

== Distinctions ==
- Knight of the National Order of the Legion of Honour (France);
- Officer of the Order of Arts and Letters (France).

== Books by Alain Kirili ==
- Mémoires de sculpteur, collection écrits d'artistes, Ed. ENSBA, Paris, 2007.
- Dessins de David Smith: Un choix de Alain Kirili, Ed. ENSBA, Paris, 2003.
- Célébrations, Ed. Christian Bourgois, Paris, 1997.
- Sculpture et Jazz, Ed. Stock, Paris, 1996.
- Rodin, Dessins érotiques, Ed. Gallimard, Paris, 1987.
- Statuaire, Ed. Denoël, Paris, 1986.
- Alberto Giacometti, Plâtres peints, Ed. Maeght, Paris, 1984.
- Yoni-Lingam, Ed. Schellman & Kluser, Munich, 1982.
