= A Better Understanding =

Studio album by Sonny Fortune
- Released: September 12, 1995
- Recorded: February 20 & 21, 1995
- Studio: Van Gelder Studio, Englewood Cliffs, NJ
- Genre: Jazz
- Length: 57:16
- Label: Blue Note
- Producer: Marty Khan, Sonny Fortune

Sonny Fortune chronology
Four in One (1994)	A Better Understanding (1995)	From Now On (1996)

A Better Understanding is an album by saxophonist Sonny Fortune which was recorded in 1995 and released on the Blue Note label.

== Reception ==
Professional ratings
Review scores
Source	Rating
AllMusic	4/5 stars
All About Jazz	5/5 stars

The AllMusic review by Scott Yanow stated "On the fine all-round A Better Understanding session, Sonny Fortune is mostly in the spotlight. Although generally playing alto, Fortune is also heard on soprano and flute ... While not one of Fortune's most essential releases (one wishes that he had played some tenor too), A Better Understanding has enough variety and surprises to make it recommended". On All About Jazz, Florence Wetzell noted "A Better Understanding, features nine Fortune originals and is an embarrassment of riches, with one excellent song after another and top-notch accompaniment".

== Track listing ==
All compositions by Sonny Fortune

1. "Mind Games" – 6:38
2. "Laying It Down" – 7:48
3. "Awakening" – 6:58
4. "A Swing Touch" – 7:04
5. "Never Again Is Such a Long Time" – 4:07
6. "It Ain't What It Was" – 5:30
7. "It's a Bird" – 6:16
8. "Tribute to a Holiday" – 6:10
9. "Long Before Our Mothers Cried" – 6:45

== Personnel ==
- Sonny Fortune – alto saxophone, soprano saxophone, alto flute, flute
- Jerry González – trumpet, flugelhorn, congas (tracks 3. 7 & 9)
- Robin Eubanks – trombone (tracks 3, 7 & 9)
- Kenny Barron – piano
- Wayne Dockery – bass
- Ronnie Burrage (tracks 1 & 9), Billy Hart (tracks 2–4 & 6–8) – drums
- Steve Berrios – percussion (tracks 3 & 9)
