= Wholly Trinity =

Studio album by Jack Walrath
- Released: 1988
- Recorded: March 15 and April 1, 1986
- Studio: Garden Productions Studios, NYC
- Genre: Jazz
- Length: 49:02
- Label: Muse; MR 5362
- Producer: Jack Walrath

Jack Walrath chronology
Killer Bunnies (1986)	Wholly Trinity (1988)	Master of Suspense (1988)

Wholly Trinity is an album by trumpeter Jack Walrath which was recorded in 1986 and released on the Muse label in 1988.

== Reception ==
Professional ratings
Review scores
Source	Rating
AllMusic	4/5 stars

The AllMusic review by Scott Yanow stated "This studio set is an excellent outing for trumpeter Jack Walrath who is showcased in a trio ... Stimulating and thought-provoking music".

== Track listing ==
All compositions by Jack Walrath except where noted

1. "Spherious" – 4:01
2. "(The Last Remake of) I Can't Get Started" (Vernon Duke, Ira Gershwin) – 5:36
3. "Killer Bunnies" – 8:05
4. "Inn the Pit" (Chip Jackson) – 7:11
5. "Baby, You Move Too Fast" – 7:40
6. "Spontooneous" (Jack Walrath, Chip Jackson, Jimmy Madison) – 6:00

== Personnel ==
- Jack Walrath – trumpet
- Chip Jackson – bass
- Jimmy Madison – drums
