= Ariane Lopez-Huici =

French photographer

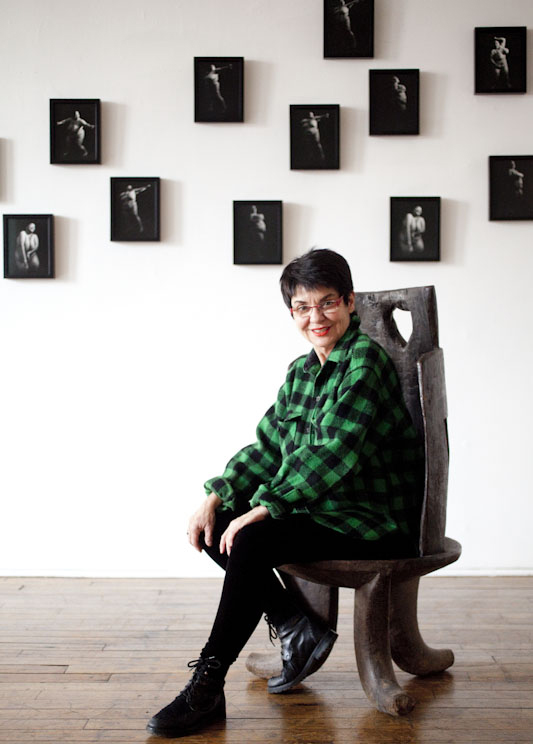
- Born: August 5, 1945; France
- Known for: photography

Ariane Lopez-Huici (born August 5, 1945) is a photographer living between New York and Paris. Her work has been successfully presented internationally in institutions – Instituto Valenciano de Arte Moderno, Spain, Musee de Grenoble, France, PS1-Moma, US, French Institute New York, USA, among many others – as well as galleries – AC Project room, NY, Galerie Franck, Paris -. She has received a strong critical interest from prominent art historians and writers, such as Arthur Danto, Edmund White, Yannick Haenel, Julia Kristeva and Carter Ratcliff.

Lopez-Huici's work is focused on the human body, constantly transgressing conventional canons of beauty. To accentuate the shadowy areas of the human adventure, she uses black and white photography marked with a pronounced grain and deep blacks. Her series Aviva, Dalila, and Holly show her passion for Rubenesque bodies. Her African series Adama & Omar and Kenekoubo Ogoïre reveal her interest for any kind of physical and sensual expression. The series Rebelles and Triumph deal with a group of voluptuous women asserting their majesty. Her series Priscille/Hecate (2009–2011), nude portraits of a handicapped model, affirms, in the tradition of Rodin, the true beauty and personality of the fragmented body. After photographing the naked body for many years, it was an unusual challenge to work with Shani Ha (2013–2016) and her wearable textile sculptures. Her images, as art critic David Cohen puts it, "convey a sense of the body as lived-in, actual and present." Lopez-Huici, as Francis Marmande says "illuminates the model, gives her the strength to transgress what we see or what we do not see."

== Intertwining life and work ==
=== Early years ===
Ariane Lopez-Huici is born in Biarritz, France, in 1945 to Eugenio Lopez-Huici, a Basque-Chilean, and Evelyne Belly from Lorraine. Her great-aunt Eugenia Errázuriz was a patron of the arts, a friend of Stravinsky and Picasso, and the subject of a well-known portrait and series of drawings by Picasso. In 1970, after finishing art school in France and Italy Lopez-Huici becomes the assistant to Brazilian filmmaker Nelson Pereira dos Santos, widely regarded as the father of Brazil's Cinema Novo. At his side she learns lighting and photographic techniques. During these years, she also develops a long-term attachment to avant-garde cinema and all forms of artistic improvisation.

=== Statuary and abstraction ===
She married sculptor Alain Kirili in 1977. That same year, she had her first one-woman exhibition at Dartmouth College (New Hampshire). On her second trip to India in 1979, she visited and photographed the famous erotic temple of Khajuraho, creating the series Indian Ecstasy. The following year, she settled with Kirili in a loft on White Street in Tribeca, New York.

At P.S.1 in New York, in 1983, she exhibited a series of photographs taken in Istanbul, entitled The Tombs of Suleiman the Magnificent. A couple of years later, in 1989, she created the series In Abstracto.

=== The model : an ongoing revelation ===
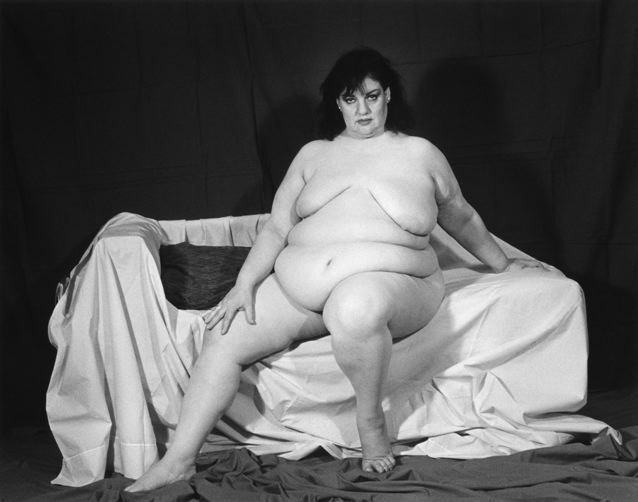
Aviva

She met the dancer Daniel D. in 1989, who modelled for Solo Absolu, one of her most striking series, where she photographed a man masturbating. The following year, she participated in the group-show Fragments, Parts, Wholes : The body and culture at White Columns, New York, curated by Saul Ostrow, on the theme of the body, where she presented male eroticism. Following this exhibition, the critic Jeanne Siegel wrote an article about male sexuality seen by women artists and particularly explored Lopez-Huici's involvement in her practice as a photographer : "The experience approaches the cinematic, particularly when a number of single frames are seen together. Her participation, her watching while recording, is undoubtedly an erotic experience. She is an accomplice in an activity that is a fulfillment of desire."

Solo Absolu, the series on male masturbation, was exhibited in 1994 at the AC Project Room Gallery, Manhattan, USA. In conjunction with this show, "A Conversation Between Julia Kristeva and Ariane Lopez-Huici" was published, where the two artists discussed among other matters what it meant to be in a couple with another artist and the photographer's relationship to sexuality.

To celebrate her fiftieth birthday and in solidarity with her models, Lopez-Huici placed herself before the camera, dancing naked in the 20 minutes film entitled TOAK- 1995.

In 1999, she exhibited for the first time in Paris her Aviva series at the Galerie Frank. This series was crucial in Lopez-Huici's search for the transgressive body. Aviva, a beautiful large woman reclined or sat proudly on a bed. Arthur Danto wrote in the exhibition catalogue that "the paraphernalia underscores Aviva's identity as a model, someone who is there to be depicted, and not to represent anything ulterior. The poses too belong to the repertory of studio poses : she is not shown doing anything but pose, which of course goes with her nudity" and further "The photographistic setting is intended as a guarantor of the reality the photographs show : Aviva is the way we see her."

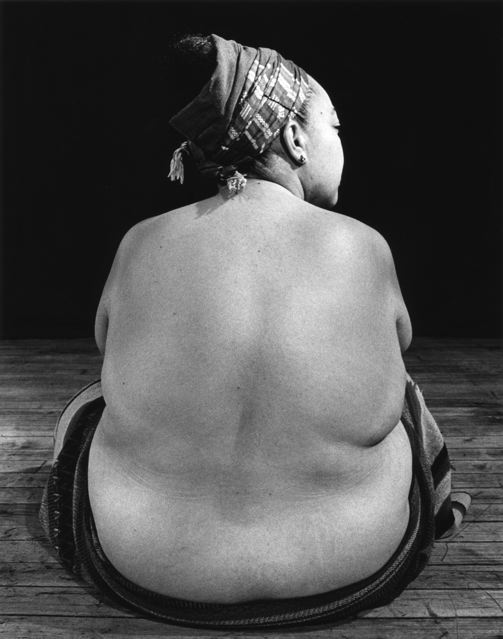
2001 Dalila 4601-8 copyrightALH WEB copy

During this show, Lopez-Huici encountered Dalila Khatir, a very important future model in her work.

The following year, at FIAC, in Paris, Gallery Frank exhibited a collection of photographs of her favorite models: Aviva, Dalila, Mother and Son, Femme à la Toilette, and a new model from New York, Bill Shannon, a paralyzed hip-hop dancer.

In 2003, she travelled extensively in West Africa, photographing the African wrestlers Adama and Omar in Dakar, the Master of Ceremonies Keneboubo Ogoïre in Mali, and Les Élégantes from Saint Louis in Sénégal. These series inspired the following comment by her friend, the critic Edmund White in an essay about her work : "She is in search of images, not the tourist's snapshots (her eye is not that passive) but rather those pictures that contest her own being or confirm her darkest suspicions or brightest hopes about human nature." The series of African wrestlers is presented later in 2005 at the Bowery Poetry Club in New York.

In 2004 she had two one-person exhibitions in museums, one at the Musée de Grenoble, France, and one at IVAM (Institut Valencià d'Art Modern), in Spain. Carter Ratcliff and Edmund White wrote for the respective catalogues.

At the New York Studio School in 2007, Lopez-Huici showed a selection of her nudes, especially her most recent group series Rebelles and Triumph, with a catalogue written by Carter Ratcliff. The latter captured something very accurate about Lopez-Huici and her work when he said : " She is a photographer She is not afraid of flesh She is not in love with pure form. Nor with impure form, for she does not believe in simple dichotomies."

In 2008, the photographer and multimedia artist Marilia Destot made the "photographic" film The Body Close Up, a retrospective documentary which revealed the evolution and artistic challenges of Lopez-Huici's photography from abstract to figurative art to a jubilant celebration of the body. The film mixed the artist's photography and her verbal commentary with musical quotes from writers and musicians close to her work. It also showed, for the first time, the intimacy of a session in the studio with the artist and her models. This film had its first screening at the Maison Française of New York University the same year.

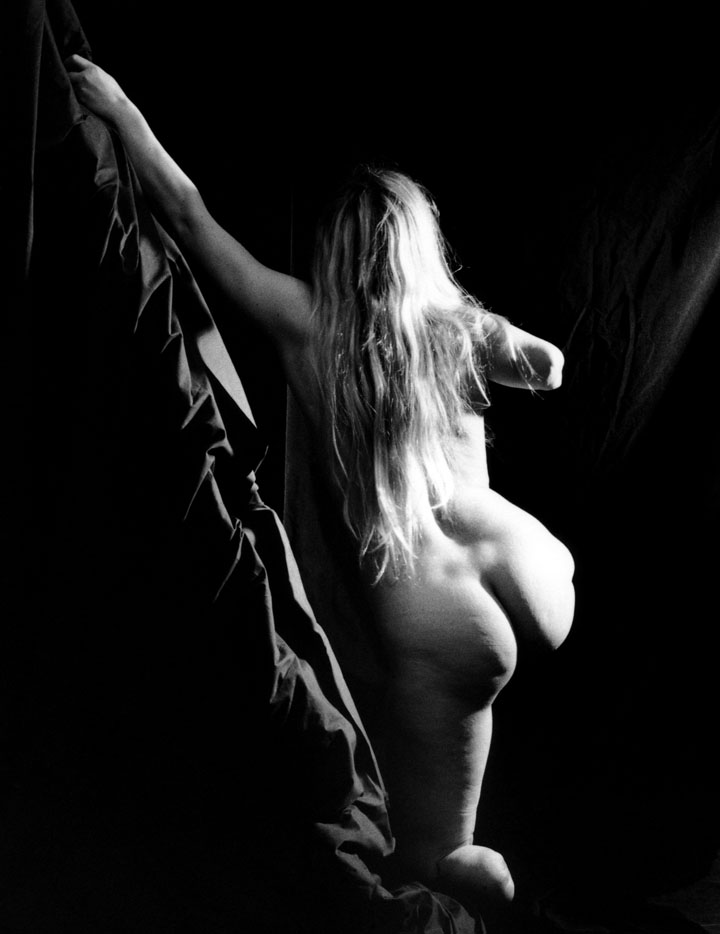
Priscille

In 2010 Lopez-Huici exhibited her series with a handicapped model, Priscille, in the joint exhibition Ariane Lopez-Huici and Marilia Destot : The Fragmented Body, at the French Institute Alliance Française in New York. Guy Sorman wrote in the text "Free Bodies" that accompanied the show, "Ariane's photos reveal to us, in all indiscretion, the degree to which we live in an era that represses bodies, even in the West, even as it pretends to liberate them" and she "authorizes us to gaze at Priscille, and to find her beautiful."

In 2012 she presented, at the New York University in France, a series of photographs she made with two important models, Dalila and Priscille. In an insightful text on Lopez-Huici's work written by the writer Yannick Haenel for the exhibition, he noted about her models : "Look at these women : they tear through the screen of convention, they are just not "right," as one says in the U.S. Their solitude is a splendid combat : that of bodies that see themselves rising up, that breathe forward, smiling with their shoulders. Their backs breathe, their hair is thinking. Breathing and thinking ground a freedom for each irreducible body," and specifically about Priscille : "For Priscille is not excluded from her body : everything in her proclaims this gracefully. Her body is calmly that of a warrior : it is desirable. It makes me want to say, transforming Rimbaud's discovery, the body is an other." He concluded "To take pleasure [jouir] is to discover the attitude, the gesture, the method that disenchants existence; every instant that breaks with our programmed captivity becomes a victory : and even if the accidents of life have damaged your body, triumph remains possible, frightening, and sublime; it is affirmed here, in the black and white lightning flashes of Ariane Lopez-Huici."

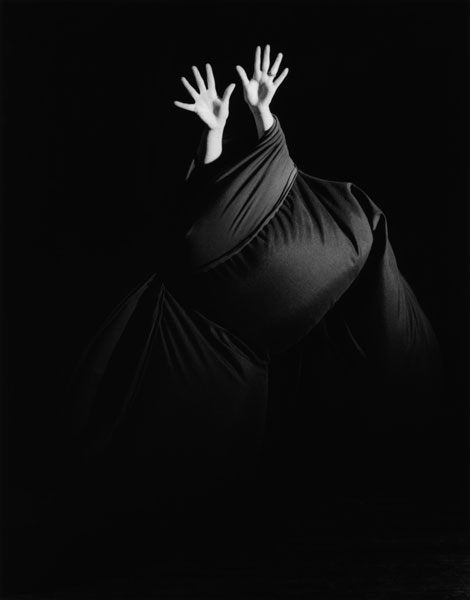
2013 Shani Ha

In 2014, Ariane Lopez-Huici exhibited in Parcours Croisés a duo with Alain Kirili at the Musée des Beaux-Arts de Caen in France. It was the first time they had had a show together and revealed a lifetime commitment to a shared artistic life.

Ultimately, as the artist put it herself during a long dialogue with her friend, the philosopher Paul Audi, "In every one of my photographs it isn't the human being that is stripped bare but the humanity of the human being. ... It's that humanity (...) which calls to me and stimulates me."

== Exhibitions ==
=== Solo exhibitions ===
- 2016 Art 3 Gallery, New York City
- 2014 Musée des Beaux-Arts de Caen, Caen, France
- 2013 Hionas Gallery, New York City
- 2012 NYU in France, Paris
- 2010 French Institute – Alliance Française, New York City
- 2007 New York Studio School, New York City
- 2005 Bowery Poetry Club, New York City
- 2004 Institut d'Art Moderne de Valencia, IVAM, Valencia, Spain
- 2004 Musée de Grenoble, Grenoble, France
- 2002 Ecole d'arts Plastiques, Chatellerault, France
- 2000 Galerie Frank, Fiac, Paris
- 1999 Galerie Frank, Paris
- 1996 AC Project Room, New York
- 1994 AC Project Room, New York
- 1993 Gérard Delsol & Laurent Innocenzi Gallery, Paris
- 1992 Colt Gallery, Nice, France
- 1988 Kunst Station Sant Peter, Cologne
- 1988 Marina Urbach Gallery, New York
- 1988 Philadelphia Museum of Judaica, Philadelphia, PA
- 1984 Galerie Dominique Marchès, Chateauroux, France
- 1983 Photography Center, Los Angeles
- 1982 P.S.1, Long Island City, New York
- 1982 New York University, La Maison Francaise, New York
- 1980 Diane Brown Gallery, Washington, USA
- 1978 Hal Bromm Gallery, New York
- 1977 Dartmouth College, Hanover, NH

=== Group exhibitions ===
- 2014 Body Conscious, curated by Emily L. Newman, Amelie A. Wallace Gallery, SUNY College at Old Westbury, NY, USA
- 2014 The Fearsome BMI: Women Artists and the Body, curated by Judith Brodsky, Rutgers University, NJ, USA
- 2012 Elizabeth A. Sackler Center for Feminist Art: Feminist Art Base: Ariane Lopez-Huici, Brooklyn Art Museum, New York
- 2011 Osez!(Dare!), curated by Katia Santibanez, Sometimes, New York
- 2009 Engendered, curated by Amina Begum Ahmed & Priyanka Mathew, Halvai Gallery, New York
- 2008 Shot Spot, curated by Katia Santibanez & G.Young, Geoffrey Young Gallery, Great Barrington, MA
- 2006 Carton Rouge, Atelier Tampon-Ramier, Paris, France.
- 2006 Vision Festival, New York
- 2006 Polyptique2, Carturesi, Timișoara, Roumania
- 2002 Femmes-Femmes, curated by Michel Bepoix, Galerie d'art du Conseil Général, Aix en Provence, France
- 2001 Voluptés, curated by Elga Wimmer, Galerie Borusan, Istanbul
- 2001 L'art dans le vent, curated by Dominique Marchès, Domaine de Chamarande, France
- 2001 L'oeil écoute curated by Alain Kirili, Duc des Lombards, Paris
- 1999 Carl André, Melissa Krestschmer, Alain Kirili, Ariane Lopez-Huici, Galerie Frank, Paris
- 1998 A Jam session of Alain Kirili, Galerie de France, Paris
- 1998 Absolu Secret, Mc Kee Gallery, NY
- 1998 The French Touch Festival, Knitting Factory, NY
- 1997 Sex/Industry curated by John Yau, Stephan Stux Gallery, NY
- 1997 David S. Ware, Mino Cinelu, Alain Kirili, Ariane Lopez-Huici, The Kitchen, NY
- 1996 Mab Library, AC Project Room, New York
- 1996 Making Pictures : Women and Photography, 1975-now, Nicole Klagsbrun Gallery, New York
- 1996 The red gate curated by Jan Hoët, Museum of contemporary art, Gent, Belgium
- 1996 Voyeur's delight curated by Barbara Rusin & Grace Roselli, Franklin Furnace, New York
- 1996 In/ Conclusive states : Ariane Lopez-Huici, Pierrick Sorin, Olivier Zabat, The fruit Market gallery, Edinburgh, Scotland
- 1996 Fotografische Momenten, curated by Jan Hoët, Museum Van Hedendaagse kunst, Gent, Belgium
- 1995 Steve lacy & Irene Aebi, Western Front Society, Vancouver
- 1995 Table of contents, curated by Gary Peterson, 450 Broadway gallery,
- 1995 NYJazz à la Goutte d'or, Studio des Islettes, Paris
- 1995 Rencontres internationales de la Photographie, curated by Michel Nuridsany, Arles
- 1995 Phallic Symbols : Images in contemporary art, curated by Hal Bromm, 24 hours for life gallery, NY
- 1995 Imago Hebraica, curated by Bali Miller, Temple Mickve Israel, Savannah, Georgia
- 1995 Cecil Taylor "Special project from New York", Uzeste musical, France
- 1994 Portrait of my mother, Institut français d'Ecosse, Edinburgh, U.K
- 1994 Portrait of my Mother, Galerie Matisse, Institut français d'U.K, London
- 1994 Couples, Elga Wimmer gallery, New York
- 1994 Imago Hebraica, curated by Bali Miller, UJA-Federation, New York
- 1994 Shooting Blind organized by Vik Muniz and Klaus Ottman, Erza and Cecile Zilkha Gallery, Center for the Arts, Wesleyan University, Middletown, Connecticut
- 1994 A life of secrets, curated by Kim Jones, AC Project room, New York
- 1993 The second round of Tennisports Arts, curated by Christian Haub, Long Island City, New York
- 1993 Jours tranquilles a Clichy organized by alain Kirili at Goyannes, Paris and at Tennisports Arts, Long Island City, New York
- 1992 Jours tranquilles a Clichy organized by Alain Kirili at Goyannes
- 1992 Songs of retribution, curated by Nancy Spero, Richard Anderson Gallery, New YorkThe inauguration of Tennisports Arts, curated by Christian Haub, Long * Island, New York
- 1992 Sex and death, Richard Anderson Gallery, New YorkLes mysteres de l'auberge espagnole, curated by Christian Bernard, Villa Arson, Nice, France
- 1991 Paris : diversite photographique, Galerie 1900–2000, Paris
- 1990 Fragments, Parts, Wholes : The body and culture, curated by Saul Ostrow, white Columns, New York
- 1990 Nahan Contemporary, curated by Robert Morgan, New York
- 1990 The Lens, Galerie 1900–2000, Art Cologne
- 1988 Bess Cutler Gallery, curated by Victoria Brown and Christian Haub, New York

== Collections ==
- Mrs. Agnes Gund Collection, New York.
- Institut d'Art Moderne de Valencia, IVAM, Valencia, SpainMusée de Grenoble, France
- N.S.M. Vie, Paris, France
- FNAC, France
- Portland Museum, Portland, US
- Permanent installation, GTE Headquarters, Dallas, US
- Time Equities, NY
- Merrill Lynch International, London

== Catalogues and articles ==
=== Catalogues ===
- 2014 Catalogue Musée de Caen, Caen, France: Yannick Haenel: Surgissement à deux and Barry Schwabsky: Duo Absolu
- 2012 Catalogue NYU in France, Paris – Yannick Haenel, The body is another.
- 2010 Catalogue French Institute – Alliance Francaise, New York : Guy Sorman : Free bodies
- 2007 Catalogue New York Studio School, New York : Carter Ratcliff: Ariane Lopez-Huici: Two or Three Things We Know About Her. David Cohen: * Introduction as Curator and Gallery Director.
- 2004 Catalogue IVAM, Valencia, Spain : Edmund White: The sacred monsters of Ariane Lopez-Huici, Julia Kristeva : Toak, Arthur Danto : The enfleshment of the self, Ramon Escriva : Ariane Lopez-Huici, Dances of shadows and flesh, Ariane Lopez-Huici: Photography and Dissidence, Conversation between Ariane Lopez-Huici and Paul Audi: The exemplarity of the model
- 2004 Catalogue Musée de Grenoble, Grenoble, France : Carter Ratcliff: Au-delà d'Athènes, en dehors de l'Eden : l'art d'Ariane Lopez-Huici, Guy Tosatto: Une chorégraphie des phantasmes
- 2002 Josyanne Savigneau: Beauté secrète, Ecole d'arts plastiques, Chatellerault, France
- 1999 Arthur.C. Danto, The enfleshment of the self, Galerie Frank, Paris
- 1996 Michel Onfray, Voir l'icone païenne, Fruitmarket gallery, Edinburgh, Scotland
- 1995 Michel Nuridsany, Peinture, photo & co, p. 17, Rencontres internationales de la photographie, Arles, France
- 1995 Cecil Taylor by Ariane Lopez-huici, Knitting Factory, New York
- 1995 Cecil Taylor-Alain Kirili, One evening at the Knitting Factory , New York
- 1994 A conversation between Julia Kristeva and Ariane Lopez-Huici, Ile de Ré, France, AC Project room, NY

=== Articles ===
Carter Ratcliff, In Conversation Carter Ratcliff with Ariane Lopez-Huici, The Brooklyn Rail, September 2016• Carter Ratcliff, Society as Cosmos, The Brooklyn Rail, May 2014• Paul-Louis Rinuy, "L'imperfection est la Cime", Narthex, March 2014• Aileen Jacobson, "Perceptions of Beauty and Their Cost", The New York Times, Sunday March 9. 2014• Edmund White, "Lavished in Kindness: Ariane Lopez-Huici Photographs Priscille", Artcritical, April 23, 2013 • Ariane Lopez–Huici and Alain Kirili, Ariane Lopez–Huici et ses modèles, Art & (online magazine) nº1, dec 11/Jan-Feb 2012, p 72–87• Valérie DI CHIAPPARI, Interview and portfolio "La différence m'attire par tout ce qu'elle représente de résistance aux normes sociales.", Faire Face Magazine, France, June 2010• Deborah Garwood, "Film Review : Ariane Lopez-Huici: The Body Close Up. A Film by Marilia Destot", ArtCritical, June 2009• Ann Landi, "Ariane Lopez-Huici, New York Studio School", ArtNews, April 2008, p 26• Lucio Pozzi, " La levità dell'opulenza", Il Giornale dell'Arte n°274, March 2008, p 38• Joe Fyfe, "Ariane Lopez-Huici : Photography, at New York Studio School", Artcritical, January 2008• Alain Kirili & Ariane Lopez-Huici, " Afrique", Fusées 9, October 2005, pp 138–155• Brooks Adams, "The Camera and the Flesh", Art in America n 2, février 2005, pp. 59–63 France Huser, "Photographe de la transgression", L'Officiel n 884, avril 2004, pp 80• FV, "De corps en accords", Le Dauphiné libéré, 26 mars 2004• Catherine Firmin-Didot, "Divers canons de beauté", Télérama Hors-série Gauguin, octobre 2003, pp 96–97• Francis Marmande, "Des secrets entre ombre et lumière", Le Monde, 22 octobre 2002• Linda Nochlin, "Off beat and naked", www.artnet.com, 8 novembre 1999• Francis Marmande," Ariane lopez-Huici, Aviva Stone et la beauté de la vérité", Le Monde 3-4 octobre 1999• France Huser, "L'art du grotesque, Peter Saul, James Ensor, Ariane lopez-Huici", L'officiel, oct 1999, pp 158–162• Michel Nuridsany," Ariane Lopez-Huici : Le poids des photos", Le Figaro, 21 septembre 1999• Nadine De Koenigswarter "Ariane Lopez-Huici-Galerie Frank", Le journal des expositions, no 66, sept 1999• Lilly Wei, "Ariane Lopez-Huici and Michel Auder at AC Project room", Art in America, October 1996• New observation 112. pp. 9, Fall 1996• Barry Schwabsky," Ariane Lopez-Huici, at AC Project room", artforum, May 1996, p. 105• Roberta Smith, The New York Times, feb 1996• Linda Yablonsky, Time Out, New York, January 17–24, 1996, p. 28• Francis Marmande, Le Monde, 22 aout 1995, p. 17• Francis Marmande, "La vie du jazz", jazz magazine, oct 1995, p. 30• Susan Hapgood, "Ariane Lopez-Huici at AC project room", art in America, nov. 1994• James Sturz, "The Stones of Venice", Forward, May 27, 1994• Carin Smilk, "Photos represent a testimony of Italian-Jewish life", Manhattan Jewish Sentinel, April 27, 1994• Jeanne Siegel, "Unveiling the male body", Art Press, sept 1993.pp 25–29• Anne Rochette&Wade Saunders "Ariane Lopez-Huici at Gerard Delsol & Laurent Innocenzi", art in America, July 1993, pp 111–112 Claire Bernstein, "Ariane Lopez-Huici", Art Press, May 1992• Frederic Altman, "Ariane Lopez-Huici-La luniere du noir", Nice-Matin, March 1, 1992• Bomb Magazine, Spring 1991, pp 42–43• Jeanne Siegel, "Erotic/fragment : Ariane Lopez-Huici's tactile photographs", arts Magazine, November 1990• Gretchen Faust, "Grossman, Lopez-Huici, Rosemberg, Schneeman, Semmel", Arts Magazine, May 1990• Joan Pachner, Ariane Lopez-Huici", New Observations, #50, September 1987• Donald Kuspit, "Ariane Lopez-Huici at P.S.1', Art in America, 1982•

=== Film ===
- Ariane Lopez-Huici : The Body Close Up, documentary on the artist by Marilia Destot, 2008
- M... la Maudite, film on the theme of the masturbation by Jean-Paul Fargier, 2007
- TOAK, a performance of Ariane Lopez-Huici filmed by Chrystel Egal, 1995
