= Awakening (Sonny Fortune album) =

Studio album by Sonny Fortune
- Released: 1975
- Recorded: August 28 and September 8–9, 1975
- Studio: Plaza Sound Studios and Sound Ideas, New York City
- Genre: Straight-ahead jazz, hard bop, modal jazz
- Length: 40:33
- Label: Horizon
- Producer: Ed Michel

Sonny Fortune chronology
Long Before Our Mothers Cried (1974)	Awakening (1975)	Waves of Dreams (1976)

Awakening is an album by American saxophonist Sonny Fortune recorded in 1975 and released on the Horizon label.

== Reception ==
Professional ratings
Review scores
Source	Rating
AllMusic	3/5 stars
The Rolling Stone Jazz Record Guide	4/5 stars
The Village Voice	A−

In The Village Voice, Robert Christgau said while Awakening featured nothing innovative, it did showcase Fortune's knack for "great synthesis", including "shades of hard bop and late-'50s Miles in a more modal setting, so lyrical and tough-minded that the 12-minute flute-and-congas thing (the title cut, wouldn't you know) becomes quite credible, even listenable." Vincent Thomas for AllMusic calls the album "an adequate set of mostly straight-ahead jazz, which sets it apart from many of his fusion-venturing peers of the '70s".

== Track listing ==
All compositions by Sonny Fortune except where noted.

1. "Triple Threat" (Rodgers Grant) - 10:27
2. "Nommo" (Jymie Merritt) - 9:38
3. "Sunshower" (Kenny Barron) - 5:14
4. "For Duke and Cannon" - 2:58
5. "Awakening" - 12:16

== Personnel ==
- Sonny Fortune - alto saxophone, flute, cowbell, chimes, claves, shaker, percussion
- Charles Sullivan - trumpet, flugelhorn (tracks 1 & 5)
- Kenny Barron - piano, electric piano (tracks 1–3 & 5)
- John Hicks - piano (track 4)
- Wayne Dockery (track 1 & 3–5), Reggie Workman (track 2) - bass
- Billy Hart (tracks 1–3 & 5), Chip Lyle (track 4) - drums
- Angel Allende - congas, percussion (tracks 2 & 5)
