= Waves of Dreams =

Studio album by Sonny Fortune
- Released: 1976
- Recorded: March 22 & 23, 1976 at Generation Sound Studios, New York City
- Genre: Jazz
- Length: 40:22
- Label: Horizon; SP-711
- Producer: Ed Michel

Sonny Fortune chronology
Awakening (1975)	Waves of Dreams (1976)	Serengeti Minstrel (1977)

Waves of Dreams is an album by American saxophonist Sonny Fortune recorded in 1976 and released on the Horizon label.

== Reception ==
The Allmusic review by Scott Yanow awarded the album 2 stars stating "Considering his talent, this was a rather weak and overly commercial effort by the great altoist Sonny Fortune".

Professional ratings
Review scores
Source	Rating
Allmusic	2/5 stars
The Rolling Stone Jazz Record Guide	4/5 stars

== Track listing ==
All compositions by Sonny Fortune except as indicated

1. "Seeing Beyond the Obvious" - 6:17
2. "A Space in Time" - 7:17
3. "In Waves of Dreams" - 6:48
4. "Revelation" (Michael Cochrane) - 9:41
5. "Thoughts" - 10:19

== Personnel ==
- Sonny Fortune - alto saxophone, soprano saxophone, flute, tambourine, synthesizer, shaker, percussion
- Charles Sullivan - trumpet, flugelhorn (tracks 1 & 3–5)
- Michael Cochrane - piano, electric piano
- Clifford Coulter - synthesizer (tracks 3 & 5)
- Buster Williams - bass
- Chip Lyle - drums
- Angel Allende - congas, percussion (tracks 1 & 3–5)
