= Killer Bunnies (album) =

Studio album by Jack Walrath + Spirit Level
- Released: 1986
- Recorded: May 12–13, 1986
- Studio: Wokingham, England
- Genre: Jazz
- Length: 49:02
- Label: Spotlite; SPJ LP25
- Producer: Jack Walrath

Jack Walrath chronology
Jack Walrath Quintet at Umbria Jazz Festival, Vol. 2 (1983)	Killer Bunnies (1986)	Wholly Trinity (1986)

Killer Bunnies is an album by trumpeter Jack Walrath which was recorded in 1986 and released on the British Spotlite label.

Professional ratings
Review scores
Source	Rating
AllMusic	4/5 stars

== Track listing ==
All compositions by Jack Walrath except where noted

1. "Snagadaa" – 8:08
2. "A Study in Porcine" – 7:50
3. "Kirsten Sunday Morning" – 4:58
4. "Killer Bunnies" – 6:12
5. "Duke Ellington's Sound of Love" (Charles Mingus) – 3:10
6. "Four Freedom" (Paul Dunmall) – 2:42
7. "Dustbiter" (Tim Richards) – 5:04

== Personnel ==
- Jack Walrath – trumpet
- Paul Dunmall – tenor saxophone
- Tim Richards – piano
- Paul Anstey – bass
- Tony Orrell – drums
