= Four in One (Sonny Fortune album) =

Studio album by Sonny Fortune
- Released: 1994
- Recorded: January 17, 18 and 27, 1994
- Studio: Van Gelder Studio, Englewood Cliffs, NJ
- Genre: Jazz
- Length: 62:18
- Label: Blue Note
- Producer: Marty Khan, Sonny Fortune

Sonny Fortune chronology
Alto Memories (1994)	Four in One (1994)	A Better Understanding (1995)

Four in One is an album of Thelonious Monk's compositions performed by saxophonist Sonny Fortune which was recorded in 1994 and released on the Blue Note label.

== Reception ==
Professional ratings
Review scores
Source	Rating
All About Jazz	5/5 stars
AllMusic	4.5/5 stars

The AllMusic review by Scott Yanow stated: "After years of erratic albums altoist Sonny Fortune finally made a great recording with this release ... Fortune plays quite passionately and really digs into the material, creating one of the finest recordings of his career". On All About Jazz, Florence Wetzell noted: "Clearly Monk has a resonance with Fortune—the interpretations are spot on, yet they are infused with his unique spirit".

== Track listing ==
All compositions by Thelonious Monk

1. "Four in One" – 6:02
2. "Criss Cross" – 5:03
3. "Reflections" – 6:44
4. "Monk's Dream" – 8:19
5. "Hornin' In" – 7:00
6. "Coming on the Hudson" – 4:38
7. "Trinkle, Tinkle" – 5:36
8. "Pannonica" – 4:12
9. "Hackensack" – 7:17
10. "Ask Me Now" – 7:27

== Personnel ==
- Sonny Fortune – alto saxophone, flute
- Kirk Lightsey – piano (tracks 1–7 & 9)
- Santi Debriano (tracks 8 & 10), Buster Williams (tracks 1, 2, 4–7 & 9) – bass
- Ronnie Burrage (track 10), Billy Hart (tracks 1, 2, 4–7 & 9) – drums
