= Sonny Fortune =

American jazz saxophonist (1939–2018)

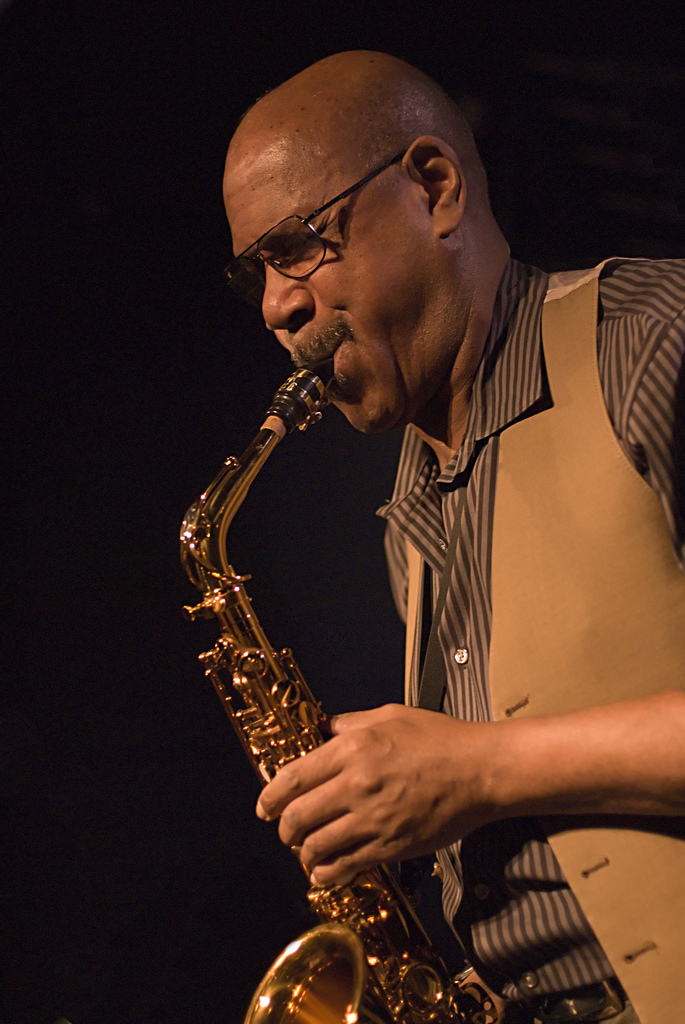
- Sonny Fortune, April 2007

Background information
- Born: Cornelius Fortune; May 19, 1939; Philadelphia, Pennsylvania, U.S
- Died: October 25, 2018 (aged 79) New York, U.S.
- Genres: Jazz, free jazz, jazz fusion
- Occupation: Musician
- Instruments: Saxophone, flute, clarinet
- Years active: 1966–2018
- Labels: Prestige, Strata-East, Horizon, Atlantic, Blue Note

Cornelius "Sonny" Fortune (May 19, 1939 – October 25, 2018) was an American jazz saxophonist. He played soprano, alto, tenor, and baritone saxophones, clarinet, and flute.

== Biography ==
He was born in Philadelphia, Pennsylvania, United States. After moving to New York City in 1967, Fortune recorded and appeared live with drummer Elvin Jones's group. In 1968, he was a member of Mongo Santamaría's band. He performed with singer Leon Thomas, and with pianist McCoy Tyner (1971–73). In 1974, Fortune replaced Dave Liebman in Miles Davis's ensemble, remaining until spring 1975, when he was succeeded by Sam Morrison. Fortune can be heard on the albums Big Fun, Get Up With It, Agharta, and Pangaea, the last two recorded live in Japan.

Fortune joined Nat Adderley after his brief tenure with Davis, then formed his own group in June 1975, recording two albums for the Horizon Records. During the 1990s, he recorded several albums for Blue Note. He has also performed with Roy Brooks, Buddy Rich, George Benson, Rabih Abou Khalil, Roy Ayers, Oliver Nelson, Gary Bartz, Rashied Ali, and Pharoah Sanders, as well as appearing on the live album The Atlantic Family Live at Montreux (1977).

Fortune died of a stroke at the age of 79 in October 2018.

== Discography ==
=== As leader ===
- 1966: Trip on the Strip with Stan Hunter (Prestige)
- 1974: Long Before Our Mothers Cried (Strata-East)
- 1975: Awakening (Horizon)
- 1976: Waves of Dreams (Horizon)
- 1977: Serengeti Minstrel (Atlantic)
- 1978: Infinity Is (Atlantic)
- 1979: With Sound Reason (Atlantic)
- 1984: Laying It Down (Konnex)
- 1986: Great Friends (Black & Blue)
- 1987: Invitation (WhyNot)
- 1991: It Ain't What It Was (Konnex)
- 1993: Monk's Mood (Konnex)
- 1994: Four in One (Blue Note)
- 1995: A Better Understanding (Blue Note)
- 1996: From Now On (Blue Note)
- 2000: In the Spirit of John Coltrane (Shanachie)
- 2003: Continuum (Sound Reason)
- 2007: You and the Night and the Music (18th & Vine)
- 2009: Last Night at Sweet Rhythm (Sound Reason)

=== As sideman ===
With Rabih Abou-Khalil

- Bukra (MMP, 1988)
- Al-Jadida (Enja, 1990)

With Nat Adderley

- On the Move (Theresa, 1983)
- Blue Autumn (Theresa, 1985)
- Autumn Leaves (Sweet Basil, 1990 [1991])
- Work Song: Live at Sweet Basil (Sweet Basil, 1990 [1993])

With Billy Bang

- Vietnam: The Aftermath (Justin Time, 2001)

With Kenny Barron

- Innocence (Wolf, 1978)

With Gary Bartz

- Alto Memories (Verve, 1994)

With George Benson

- Tell It Like It Is (A&M/CTI, 1969)

With Miles Davis

- Big Fun (Columbia, 1974)
- Get Up with It (Columbia, 1974)
- Agharta (Columbia, 1975)
- Pangaea (Columbia, 1976)

With Dizzy Gillespie

- Closer to the Source (Atlantic, 1984)

With Elvin Jones

- Elvin Jones Jazz Machine Live at Pit Inn (Polydor (Japan), 1985)
- When I Was at Aso-Mountain (Enja, 1990)
- In Europe (Enja, 1991)
- It Don't Mean a Thing (Enja, 1993)

With Charles Mingus

- Three or Four Shades of Blues (Atlantic, 1977)

With Alphonse Mouzon

- The Essence of Mystery (Blue Note, 1972)

With Pharoah Sanders

- Izipho Zam (My Gifts) (Strata-East, 1969 [1973])

With Melvin Sparks

- Akilah! (Prestige, 1972)

With Leon Spencer

- Bad Walking Woman (Prestige, 1972)
- Where I'm Coming From (Prestige, 1973)

With Charles Sullivan

- Genesis (Strata-East, 1974)

With McCoy Tyner

- Sahara (Milestone, 1972)
- Song for My Lady (Milestone, 1973)

With Mal Waldron

- Crowd Scene (Soul Note, 1989)
- Where Are You? (Soul Note, 1989)

With Mongo Santamaría

- Stone Soul (1969)

== Filmography ==
- Elvin Jones: Jazz Machine (2008) with Ravi Coltrane, Willie Pickens and Chip Jackson
- Europafest: Jazz Highlights (2008) with Mike Stern, Bob Berg, Sun Ra, Archie Shepp, John Zorn, Bill Frisell
