= Francis Marmande =

French author, musician and journalist (1945–2025)

- Born: 10 January 1945; Bayonne, France
- Died: 25 December 2025 (aged 80); Paris, France
- Occupations: Author, musician and journalist

Francis Marmande (10 January 1945 – 25 December 2025) was a French author, musician and journalist for the French newspaper Le Monde from 1977. Marmande also served as the director of a modern literature laboratory (Littérature au présent) at Paris Diderot University.

== Life and career ==
Marmande was born on 10 January 1945. He graduated in 1966 from the École Normale Supérieure in Saint-Cloud. A jazz critic, Marmande also played double bass and recorded with the Jac Berrocal Group. He was a contributor to Jazz Magazine from 1971 to 2000, which he also helped illustrate from 1976 to 1994.

From 2006, he had a regular column in Le Monde, writing on topics such as jazz, bullfighting, and literature.

Marmande died from cancer in Paris on 25 December 2025, at the age of 80.

== Bibliography ==
- Bataille politique, Presses Universitaires de Lyon, 1985.
- L’Indifférence des ruines, Parenthèses, 1985.
- La Mémoire du chien, Fourbis, 1993.
- Œillet rouge sur le sable, avec Florence Delay, Fourbis, 1994.
- La Perfection du bonheur, Descartes & Cie, 1994 ISBN 2-910301-07-9
- Le Chemin des dames, Fourbis, 1995.
- La Housse partie, Fourbis, 1997.
- La Chambre d’amour, éditions du Scorff, 1997.
- Suzanne un jour, avec Rodrigo de Zayas, Esprit des péninsules, 1999.
- Chutes libres, Farrago, 2000.
- La Police des caractères, Descartes & Cie, 2001.
- Curro, Romero, y Curro Romero, Verdier, 2001 ISBN 2-86432-339-7
- À partir du lapin, Verdier, 2002 ISBN 2-86432-359-1
- Rocío, Verdier, 2003 ISBN 2-86432-393-1
