= France Huser =

French novelist and art critic

France Huser is a French novelist and art critic who lives and works in Paris.

== Biography ==
France Huser was an art critic at the Nouvel Observateur for many years. Her first novel, La maison du désir, "the book of feelings", won her critical and popular success. She is the author of eleven novels including Aurélia, La colline rouge, and Le murmure des sables published by Editions du Seuil, and La fille à lèvre d'orange, La triche and La peau seulement published by Gallimard. France Huser was awarded the Amerigo Vespucci prize in 2004 for her novel Le murmure des sables.

== Novels ==
- 1982: La maison du désir, Paris, Éditions du Seuil, ISBN 2020062674
- 1984: Aurélia, Le Seuil, ISBN 2020091801
- 1986: La chambre ouverte, Le Seuil, ISBN 2020093138
- 1988: Les lèvres nues, Le Seuil, ISBN 2020115484
- 1992: La colline rouge, Le Seuil, ISBN 2020135264
- 1993: Charlotte Corday ou l'Ange de la colère, Paris, Éditions Robert Laffont, ISBN 2221057333
- 1999: Les rescapés du Titanic, Bernard Géniès, France Huser, Fayard, ISBN 978-2-213-60354-4
- 2004: Le murmure des sables, Le Seuil, ISBN 2020631113
- 2006: La fille à lèvre d'orange, Paris, Éditions Gallimard, 144 pages ISBN 2070779815
- 2010: La triche, Gallimard, 176 pages ISBN 9782070128617
- 2011: La peau seulement, Gallimard
