= Jack Walrath =

American jazz trumpeter, composer, bandleader

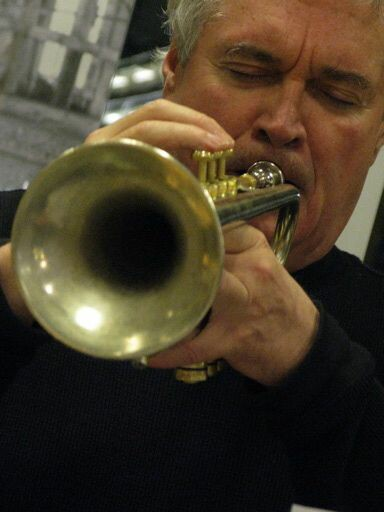

Background information
- Born: May 5, 1946 (age 79); Stuart, Florida, U.S.
- Genres: Jazz
- Occupation: Musician
- Instrument: Trumpet
- Labels: Stash, SteepleChase, Red, Muse, Blue Note, Mapleshade, Evidence
- Website: www.jackwalrath.net

Jack Arthur Walrath (born May 5, 1946) is an American post-bop jazz trumpeter and musical arranger known for his work with Ray Charles, Gary Peacock, Charles Mingus, and Glenn Ferris, among others.

== Biography ==
Walrath was born in Stuart, Florida, United States. He began playing the trumpet at the age of nine in 1955 while living in the small town of Edgar, Montana. He attributes his wide range of musical appreciation to a "lack of negative peer pressure which so often happens in cities".

In 1969 Walrath relocated to the West Coast and found work in Los Angeles's jazz scene. Soon he was a member of the band Revival, with trombonist Glenn Ferris, and the West Coast MotownOrchestra. He worked with Ray Charles for one tour of the U.S. In 1970 Walrath relocated to New York City. For a year and a half he was a columnist of the International Musician and Recording World, which had its US department there. He also wrote liner notes and articles for DownBeat.

Walrath spent the next several years working with mainstream and Latin jazz bands.

With Mingus he recorded Changes One and Changes Two, both for Atlantic Records in 1974. The latter album features Walrath's composition "Black Bats and Poles" (originally entitled "Rats and Moles" until Mingus decided it needed a darker name).

== Discography ==
=== As leader or co-leader ===
- Demons in Pursuit, (Gatemouth, 1979)
- In Montana, (Labor, 1980, reissued 2001)
- Revenge of the Fat People, (Stash, 1981)
- In Europe, (SteepleChase, 1982)
- A Plea for Sanity, (Stash, 1982)
- Jack Walrath Quintet at Umbria Jazz Festival, Vol. 1, (Red, 1983)
- Jack Walrath Quintet at Umbria Jazz Festival, Vol. 2, (Red, 1983)
- Killer Bunnies, (Spotlite, 1986)
- Wholly Trinity, (Muse, 1986 [1988])
- Master of Suspense, (Blue Note, 1986)
- A-Free-K & Jack Walrath, (Justine Records, 1986) with Jorge Rossy, Perico Sambeat
- Neohippus, (Blue Note, 1988)
- Out of the Tradition, (Muse, 1990 [1992])
- Gut Feelings, (Muse, 1990 [1992]))
- Serious Hang, (Muse, 1992)
- Portraits in Ivory and Brass, (Mapleshade, 1994) with Larry Willis and Steve Novosel
- Journey, Man!, (Evidence, 1995)
- Hip Gnosis, (TCB, 1996)
- Solidarity, (ACT, 1996)
- "Vongole!" Live In Ancona (w/ Ares Tavolazzi b, Fabio Grandi d, Andrea Pozza p, Riccardo Mei voc), GoFour 1996)
- Sonage by Duplexus, (Rara, 2000)
- Get Hit in Your Soul, (ACT, 2000)
- Invasion of the Booty Shakers, (Savant, 2001)
- Ballroom, (SteepleChase, 2008)
- Heavy Mirth, (SteepleChase, 2008)
- Forsooth, (SteepleChase, 2011)
- To Hellas and Back, (SteepleChase, 2013)
- Montana Wild Cats (w/ pianist Philip Aaberg and bassist Kelly Roberti), Sweetgrass Music, 2013)
- You Got My Wife, But I Got Your Dog (w/ Upper Austrian Jazz Orchestra; ATS Records 2014)
- Unsafe at Any Speed, (SteepleChase, 2015)

=== As sideman ===
- The King Arrives, King Errisson, (Canyon, 1970)
- Changes One, Charles Mingus, (Atlantic, 1974)
- Changes Two, Charles Mingus, (Atlantic, 1974)
- Three or Four Shades of Blues, Charles Mingus, (Atlantic, 1977)
- Lionel Hampton Presents Charles Mingus, Charles Mingus, (Who's Who in Jazz, 1977)
- Cumbia & Jazz Fusion, Charles Mingus, (Atlantic, 1978)
- Live at Montreux, Mingus Dynasty, (Collectables, 1980)
- Dannie Richmond Plays Charles Mingus, Dannie Richmond, (Timeless, 1980)
- Tenor for the Times, Ricky Ford, (Muse, 1981)
- Something Like a Bird, Charles Mingus, (Atlantic, rec. 1979, issued 1981)
- Dannie Richmond Quintet, Dannie Richmond, (Gatemouth, 1981)
- Sax Maniac, James White, (Warner Bros., 1982)
- Dionysius, Dannie Richmond, (Red, 1983)
- In Case You Missed It, Charli Persip Superband, (Soul Note, 1984)
- No Dummies Allowed, Charli Persip Superband, (Soul Note, 1987)
- Give the Drummer Some, Mike Clark, (Stash, 1989)
- Hearinga Suite, Muhal Richard Abrams, (Black Saint, 1989)
- At Last, Lou Rawls, (Blue Note, 1989)
- The Jazz Tribe, Jazz Tribe, (Red, 1990)
- Blu Blu Blu, Muhal Richard Abrams, (Black Saint, 1991)
- Miles & Quincy: Live at Montreux, Miles Davis and Quincy Jones, (Warner Bros., 1991)
- Beyond Another Wall: Live in China, George Gruntz Concert Jazz Band, (TCB, 1992)
- Blues and the Abstract Truth, Suzanne Pittson, (Vineland, 1992)
- Blues Mission, Pee Wee Ellis, (Gramavision, 1992)
- Single Petal of a Rose, John Hicks (Mapleshade, 1992)
- Why I Like Coffee, Bob Nell, (New World, 1992)
- Mood Swing, Manhattan New Music Project, (Soul Note, 1992)
- Nostalgia In Times Square, Mingus Big Band 93, (Dreyfus, 1993)
- Rush Hour, Joe Lovano, (Blue Note, 1994)
