= Steve Novosel =

American jazz musician (born 1940)

Steven Novosel (born 1940) is an American jazz double bassist and educator whose 40-plus year career has spanned numerous genre, from traditional jazz to swing, bebop, mainstream and avant garde.

== Early life and musical development ==
Born in Farrell, Pennsylvania outside Pittsburgh in 1940, Novosel is of Croatian-American heritage. He learned to play the piano as a child, including performing traditional Croatian folk songs learned from his family. He next studied trumpet in high school and his love of jazz inspired him to become a professional musician. Upon his graduation from high school Novosel went to New York City to undertake three years of advanced trumpet study before being drafted and winning an audition to join the US Army Band at Ft. Myer, Virginia, outside Washington, D.C. While in the service he discovered that there were many established jazz trumpet players in the DC-Baltimore area but a shortage of bassists, so he began to learn the bass by participating in the ubiquitous jam sessions in the region at that time. Taken under the wing of DC saxophonist Charlie Hampton, Novosel soon began playing gigs in DC and Baltimore. Novosel also studied the double bass formally with ex-Detroit Symphony classical bassist Thomas Martin, (future Principal Bassist with the London Philharmonic Orchestra,) who at that time was also serving his military obligation in the US Army Band at Ft. Myer.

Although left-handed, Novosel mastered the double bass playing it in a right-hand set up.

== Professional career ==
By 1966, Novosel had left the service and was working as a full-time professional bassist in DC, New York and other east coast venues with a variety of groups, most notably as the replacement for Walter Booker in the acclaimed JFK Quartet. That same year, multi-reed player Rahsaan Roland Kirk was searching for a new bassist and Kirk's drummer Jimmy Hopps recommended Novosel for the job. In 1967, Novosel recorded with Kirk on the latter's highly acclaimed The Inflated Tear LP. Novosel remained with Kirk for the next three years and toured widely, including a successful Eastern Europe tour. Novosel had by this time become acquainted with saxophonist David Fathead Newman and appeared (playing electric bass) on Newman's funk-oriented 1971 LP, Captain Buckles. This led to a long association between Novosel and Newman.

Over the next 30 years, Novosel performed with, recorded with and/or toured with a veritable Who's Who of Jazz, including Cedar Walton, Milt Jackson, Bobby Hackett, Al Grey, Pharoah Sanders, Eddie Vinson, the Teddy Wilson Trio, the Red Norvo Trio, Stanley Cowell, Larry Willis, Jimmy Heath, Charlie Byrd, Elvin Jones, James Moody, Jimmy Cobb, Slide Hampton, Norman Simmons, John Hicks, Steve Turre, Gary Bartz, Tal Farlow, Blue Mitchell, Jack Walrath, Buck Hill, Archie Shepp, Harry Sweets Edison, Eddie Lockjaw Davis, Jake Hanna, and vocalists Billy Eckstine, Betty Carter, Mavis Rivers, Shirley Horn and Anita O'Day. Novosel has also participated in some 20 recording projects with avant garde saxophonist and John Coltrane musicologist Andrew White since the 1960s. He has also performed in the Washington theater productions of A Raisin In The Sun and Don't Bother Me, I Can't Cope. He has appeared numerous times at the "North Sea Jazz Festival", at the "East Coast Jazz Festival" and the "Floating Jazz Festival", as well as The Kennedy Center, The Corcoran Gallery, The Smithsonian, Wolftrap and club venues from coast to coast. He has toured Europe and Eastern Europe and performed in Hong Kong with the Teddy Wilson Trio. In 2001 he led a group that included guitarist Joe Cohn on a concert tour of the Balkans, including Croatia.

Novosel has also been an adjunct Instructor of Double Bass Performance at both American University and the University of the District of Columbia for many years, and he remains an active voice on the national jazz scene.

Novosel was married to singer Roberta Flack from 1965 to 1972.

== Discography ==
With the David Bond Quintet

- The Early Show (CIMPoL, 2007)

With Stanley Cowell

- Blues for the Viet Cong (Polydor, 1969) - also released as Travellin' Man (Black Lion)

With Al Grey

- Live at the Floating Jazz Festival (Chiaroscuro, 1991)
- Christmas Stockin' Stuffer (Capri, 1992)

With Eddie Harris

- The Versatile Eddie Harris (Atlantic, 1981)

With John Hicks

- The John Hicks Trio & Strings (Mapleshade, 2002)

With Shirley Horn

- Loving You (Verve, 1997)
- The Main Ingredient (Verve, 1995)

With Milt Jackson

- High Fly (Live at E.J.'s, 1982)

With Donny Hathaway

- Donny Hathaway (ATCO, 1971)

With Rahsaan Roland Kirk

- The Inflated Tear (Atlantic, 1968)

With David "Fathead" Newman

- Captain Buckles (Cotillion, 1971)
- Under a Woodstock Moon (Kokopelli, 1996)
- Chillin' (HighNote, 1998)
- Keep the Spirits Singing (HighNote, 2002)

With Charles Tolliver

- The Ringer (Polydor, 1969)
- Compassion (Strata-East, 1977)

With Andrew White

- Passion Flower (Andrew's Music, 1974)

With Larry Willis

- Portraits in Ivory and Brass (Mapleshade, 1992 [1994]) with Jack Walrath
- Sunshower (Mapleshade, 2001)
- Sanctuary (Mapleshade, 2003)

== Bibliography ==
- Hittle, Jon B. (2004). "Capital Bassist: Steve Novosel's Jazz Journey". Bass World Journal, International Society of Bassists. Volume 28 - Series 2: p. 15-19
- Kruth, John (2000). Bright Moments: The Life and Times of Rahsaan Roland Kirk. New York, NY: Welcome Rain Publishers. p. 76. ISBN 1-56649-105-3.
