= Keep the Dream Alive (album) =

Studio album by David "Fathead" Newman
- Released: 1978
- Recorded: May 23 & July, 1977
- Studio: Fantasy Studios, Berkeley, CA
- Genre: Jazz
- Length: 39:23
- Label: Prestige; P-10106
- Producer: Orrin Keepnews, William Fischer

David "Fathead" Newman chronology
Concrete Jungle (1978)	Keep the Dream Alive (1978)	Scratch My Back (1979)

Keep the Dream Alive is an album by American jazz saxophonist David "Fathead" Newman recorded in 1977 and released on the Prestige label.

Professional ratings
Review scores
Source	Rating
AllMusic	3/5 stars

== Track listing ==
1. "Keep the Dream Alive" (David "Fathead" Newman) – 5:46
2. "Destiny" (David Batteau, Richard Holland) – 5:38
3. "Silver Morning" (Kenny Rankin, Yvonne Rankin) – 3:29
4. "Freaky Beat" (Newman, William Fischer) – 5:40
5. "I Am Singing" (Stevie Wonder) – 6:32
6. "Clouds" (Mauricio Einhorn, Durval Ferreira) – 5:59
7. "As Good As You Are" (William Fischer) – 6:19

== Personnel ==
- David "Fathead" Newman – tenor saxophone, alto saxophone, soprano saxophone, flute
- George Cables, Hilton Ruiz – keyboards
- George Davis, Lee Ritenour – guitar
- Wilbur Bascomb – electric bass
- Idris Muhammad – drums
- Bill Summers – congas, percussion
- Jeff Davis, Larry Moses – trumpet (tracks 1, 2, 5 & 7)
- Earl McIntyre, Janice Robinson – trombone (tracks 1, 2, 5 & 7)
- Kenneth Harris – flute (tracks 1, 2, 5 & 7)
- Ed Xiques – baritone saxophone (tracks 1, 2, 5 & 7)
- Renée Manning. Yvonne Fletcher – backing vocals (tracks 1, 2, 5 & 7)
- William Fischer – arranger, conductor
