= Reggae II =

Studio album by Herbie Mann
- Released: 1976
- Recorded: 1973
- Studio: Dynamic, Kingston, Jamaica; Advision, London; Atlantic, New York City
- Genre: Jazz
- Label: Atlantic; SD 18182
- Producer: Herbie Mann

Herbie Mann chronology
Surprises (1976)	Reggae II (1976)	Bird in a Silver Cage (1976)

Reggae II is an album by flautist Herbie Mann recorded in 1973 and released on the Atlantic label in 1976 in New Zealand and Europe. The album follows up Mann's Reggae from 1973 featuring Tommy McCook's band with Albert Lee and Mick Taylor featured on one track.

== Track listing ==
1. "Down on the Corner" (John Fogerty) - 5:10
2. "Bend Down Low" (Bob Marley) - 10:20
3. "So Get It While You Can" (Herbie Mann) - 4:17
4. "Cecilia" (Paul Simon) - 4:40
5. "I Know (You Don't Love Me No More)" (Barbara George) - 6:10
6. "Stoned By You" (Mann) - 5:53

== Personnel ==
- Herbie Mann - flute, percussion
- Bobby Ellis - trumpet (tracks 1, 2 & 4–6)
- Tommy McCook (tracks 1, 2 & 4–6), David "Fathead" Newman (track 3) - tenor saxophone
- Gladstone Anderson - piano (tracks 1, 2 & 4–6)
- Winston Wright - organ (tracks 1, 2 & 4–6)
- Pat Rebillot - keyboards (tracks 1, 2, 5 & 6)
- Hux Brown (tracks 1, 2 & 4–6), Radcliffe "Dougie" Bryan (tracks 1, 2 & 4–6), Johnny Christopher (track 3), Albert Lee (track 6), Mick Taylor (track 6), Reggie Young (track 3) - guitar
- Jackie Jackson (tracks 1, 2 & 4–6), Mike Leech (track 3) - bass
- Michael Richards (tracks 1, 2 & 4–6) - drums
- Carlos "Patato" Valdes - congas (track 3)

Technical

- Arif Mardin - co-producer on "So Get It While You Can"
- Byron Lee - co-producer on "Bend Down Low" and "Cecilia"
- Geoffrey Haslam - co-producer on "Stoned By You"
- Gary Martin, Graeme Goodall, Jimmy Douglass, Ronald Logan, Stan Kesler - engineer
- Don Brautigan - cover artwork
