= Concrete Jungle (David "Fathead" Newman album) =

Studio album by David "Fathead" Newman
- Released: 1978
- Recorded: November 8–10, 1977
- Studio: Fantasy Studios, Berkeley, CA
- Genre: Jazz
- Length: 41:24
- Label: Prestige; P-10104
- Producer: Orrin Keepnews, William Fischer

David "Fathead" Newman chronology
Front Money (1977)	Concrete Jungle (1978)	Keep the Dream Alive (1978)

Concrete Jungle is an album by American jazz saxophonist David "Fathead" Newman recorded in 1977 and released on the Prestige label.

== Reception ==
Professional ratings
Review scores
Source	Rating
AllMusic	2/5 stars

In his review for AllMusic, Scott Yanow stated: A versatile performer, David "Fathead" Newman has appeared through the years in both straight-ahead and commercial settings. This LP is definitely in the latter category. Newman, who splits his time here almost equally between alto, soprano, tenor and flute, is accompanied by an electronic rhythm section ... The music was instantly dated, overproduced, and not up to Newman's usual level".

== Track listing ==
1. "Knocks Me Off My Feet" (Stevie Wonder) – 4:04
2. "Save Your Love for Me" (Buddy Johnson) – 5:21
3. "Blues for Ball" (McCoy Tyner) – 5:21
4. "Dance of the Honey Bee and the Funky Fly" (William Fischer) – 6:19
5. "Concrete Jungle" (Bob Marley) – 7:30
6. "Sun Seeds" (David "Fathead" Newman) – 5:18
7. "Distant Lover" (Marvin Gaye, Gwen Gordy Fuqua, Sandra Greene) – 7:31

== Personnel ==
- David "Fathead" Newman – tenor saxophone, alto saxophone, soprano saxophone, flute
- Pat Rebillot – keyboards
- Jay Graydon – electric guitar
- Abraham Laboriel – electric bass
- Idris Muhammad – drums
- Bill Summers – congas, percussion
- Jimmy Owens, Milt Ward – trumpet (tracks 1–3, 5 & 7)
- Earl McIntyre – trombone (tracks 1–3, 5 & 7)
- Kenneth Harris – flute (tracks 1–3, 5 & 7)
- Babe Clark – tenor saxophone (tracks 1–3, 5 & 7)
- Clarence Thomas – baritone saxophone (tracks 1–3, 5 & 7)
- String section: (tracks 1, 2, 4 & 7)
  - Gene Orloff, Harry Lookofsky, Kathryn Kienke, Regis Iandiorio, Sanford Allen, Yoko Matsuo, Stan Pollock, Anthony Posk – violin
  - Alfred Brown, Linda Lawrence – viola
  - Kermit Moore – cello
- William Fischer – arranger, conductor
