= Scratch My Back (David "Fathead" Newman album) =

Studio album by David "Fathead" Newman
- Released: 1979
- Recorded: March 1979
- Studio: Fantasy, Berkeley, CA
- Genre: Disco, jazz
- Length: 37:25
- Label: Prestige; P-10108
- Producer: Orrin Keepnews, William Fischer

David "Fathead" Newman chronology
Keep the Dream Alive (1977)	Scratch My Back (1979)	Resurgence! (1981)

Scratch My Back is an album by American jazz saxophonist David "Fathead" Newman, recorded in 1979 and released on the Prestige label. It was produced by Orrin Keepnews and William Fischer.

== Critical reception ==
Professional ratings
Review scores
Source	Rating
AllMusic	3/5 stars

The Spokane Daily Chronicle lamented that "disco madness has hit Newman full force."

== Track listing ==
All compositions by Jay Fleecewood, Tanyette Willoughby and David "Fathead" Newman except where noted

1. "One Step at a Time" – 5:51
2. "You Gotta Keep Gotta Keep Dancin'" – 6:34
3. "Two Can Do It" – 6:25
4. "Scratch My Back" (Kevin Toney) – 5:52
5. "Rock Me, Baby (Like My Back Ain't Got No Bone)" (Toney, Bessie Scott) – 5:34
6. "After the Ball" (Fleecewood, Newman) – 3:40
7. "The Buggs" (Claude Johnson) – 3:29

== Personnel ==
- David "Fathead" Newman – tenor saxophone, alto saxophone, soprano saxophone, flute
- Kevin Toney – electric piano, clavinet, synthesizers
- Richard Tee – piano (tracks 3–7)
- Cornell Dupree (tracks 3–7), Eric Gale (tracks 1 & 2) – guitar
- Ron Carter – bass (tracks 1–3, 6 & 7)
- Wilbur Bascomb – bass guitar (tracks 3–5)
- Harvey Mason – drums
- Bill Summers – congas, percussion
- Tanyette (tracks 1–3), Bessie Ruth Scott (track 5) – lead vocals
- Randy Brecker, Jon Faddis – trumpet (tracks 1, 2, 4. 5 & 7)
- Earl McIntyre – trombone (tracks 1, 2, 4. 5 & 7)
- Jerry Dodgion, Kenneth Harris, George Marge – flute (tracks 1–5 & 7)
- James Buffington – French horn (track 3)
- String section: (tracks 1–6)
  - Gerald Tarak – concertmaster, violin
  - Anahid Ajemian, Frederick Buldrini, Harold Kohon, Joseph Malignaggi, Anthony Posk, Charles Veal, Marylin Wright – violin
  - Julian Barber, Alfred Brown – viola
  - Jesse Levy, Kermit Moore – cello
- Flame Braithwaite (tracks 2, 4 & 5), Ben Carter (track 5), Deborah McGriff (tracks 2, 4 & 5) – backing vocals
- William Fischer – arranger, conductor
