= Mr. Fathead =

Studio album by David Newman
- Released: 1976
- Recorded: 1976
- Studio: Regent Sound Studios, New York City
- Genre: Jazz
- Length: 39:47
- Label: Warner Bros; BS 2917
- Producer: Joel Dorn, Jonathan Dorn for the Masked Announcer

David Newman chronology
Newmanism (1974)	Mr. Fathead (1976)	Front Money (1977)

Mr. Fathead is an album by American jazz saxophonist David Newman recorded in 1977 and released on the Warner Bros label.

== Reception ==
Professional ratings
Review scores
Source	Rating
AllMusic	1.5/5 stars

In his review for AllMusic, Alex Henderson stated: "Newman showed a lot of R&B fans that improvisatory horn solos weren't something to be afraid of. Improvisation, however, isn't something that you will hear a lot of on 1976's disappointing Mr. Fathead ... For the most part, this erratic and unfocused LP isn't soul-jazz, most of the material is either disco-funk or lightweight instrumental pop. ... for the most part, Mr. Fathead wastes Newman's considerable talents. This record is strictly for completists".

== Track listing ==
1. "Dance With Me" (John Hall, Johanna Hall) – 3:54
2. "Groovin' to the Music" (Gregory P. Coverdale, Diane Cameron, Deborah McGriff) – 5:51
3. "You Got Style" (Ralph MacDonald, William Salter) – 4:33
4. "Ebo Man" (David Newman, Arthur Jenkins) – 5:31
5. "Shiki" (Bill Fischer) – 4:01
6. "Promise Me Your Love" (MacDonald, Salter) – 4:34
7. "I Love Music" (Kenny Gamble, Leon Huff) – 6:14
8. "Mashooganah" (Newman) – 5:09

== Personnel ==
- David Newman – tenor saxophone, alto saxophone, soprano saxophone, flute
- Bill Fischer – electric piano, synthesizer, arranger (tracks 1–3, 5, 7 & 8)
- Arthur Jenkins – piano, keyboards, arranger, conductor (tracks 1, 4, 6 & 8)
- Pat Rebillot – clavinet (tracks 1–3, 7 & 8)
- Jose Cruz – piano, electric piano (tracks 2, 3 & 5)
- Ben Lanzarrone – electric piano (track 7)
- Jim Bossy (tracks 2, 3 & 5), Burt Collins (tracks 4 & 6), Joseph Shepley (tracks 4 & 6) – trumpet
- Buddy Morrow – trombone (tracks 4 & 6)
- Jonathan Dorn – tuba (tracks 1, 4, 6 & 8)
- Billy Slapin – clarinet, piccolo (tracks 4 & 6)
- Richard Landry (tracks 2, 3 & 5) Richard Peck (track 5) – tenor saxophone
- Luis Cruz (tracks 2, 3 & 5), Jerry Friedman (tracks 4 & 7), Keith Loving (track 4) – guitar
- Ron Carter (tracks 1, 7 & 8), Bill Salter (tracks 4 & 6) – bass
- Anthony Jackson – bass guitar (tracks 2, 3 & 5)
- Nathaniel Gibbs (track 5), Jimmy Johnson (tracks 1, 7 & 8), Andy Newmark (tracks 4, & 6), Jimmie Young (tracks 2 & 3) – drums
- Ralph MacDonald (track 4), John Rodrieguez (track 4), Dom Um Romão (tracks 1, 5, 7 & 8), David Valentin (tracks 2, 3 & 5) – percussion
- David Carey – vibraphone, chimes tambourine (tracks 4 & 6)
- Patti Austin (tracks 4 & 6), Benjamin Carter (tracks 3 & 7), Diane Cameron (track 2), William Eaton (track 4), Yvonne Fletcher (tracks 3 & 7), Frank Floyd (tracks 4 & 6) Denise Flythe (track 2), Deborah McDuffie (tracks 4 & 6), Deborah McGriff (track 2), Bessye Ruth Scott (tracks 3 & 7) – backing vocals
- Gregory P. Coverdale – vocal arranger (track 2)
- String section: (track 7)
  - Ariana Bronne, Elliot Rosoff, Eugene Moye, Gene Orloff, Guy Lumia, Harold Kohon, Harry Zaratzian, Julien Barber, Kathryn Kienke, Marie Hence, Norman Carr, Sanford Allen, Thomas Kornacker, Tony Posk, Warren Laffredo, Yoko Matsuo – violin
  - Selwart Clarke – viola
