= Song for the New Man =

Studio album by David "Fathead" Newman
- Released: January 13, 2004
- Recorded: October 15, 2003
- Studio: Van Gelder, Englewood Cliffs, NJ
- Genre: Jazz
- Length: 53:10
- Label: HighNote; HCD 7120
- Producer: David "Fathead" Newman, Houston Person

David "Fathead" Newman chronology
The Gift (2003)	Song for the New Man (2004)	I Remember Brother Ray (2005)

Song for the New Man is an album by American saxophonist David "Fathead" Newman, recorded in 2003 and released on the HighNote label early the following year.

== Reception ==
Professional ratings
Review scores
Source	Rating
AllMusic	4.5/5 stars
The Penguin Guide to Jazz Recordings	2.5/4 stars

In his review on AllMusic, Scott Yanow states, "At the age of 70, veteran tenor saxophonist David 'Fathead' Newman is in prime form throughout this well-rounded set... Highly recommended to straight-ahead jazz fans, this set shows that ... Newman, who has had a diverse career, is at heart a big-toned swinger in the tradition of Gene Ammons". In JazzTimes, Michael Edwards noted, "Song for the New Man is a forthright rebuttal to the notion that an album with no overriding theme, no avant-garde experimentation and no scale-beating vocalist will be humdrum. This is hugely satisfying jazz playing with a verve and polish all its own". On All About Jazz, Joel Roberts said that "his latest effort shows that while he’s mellowed a bit as he’s aged, he hasn’t lost a step. It’s the combination of bluesy grit and post bop polish that gives Newman’s tenor sax playing its special allure, and both are on display on Song for the New Man"

== Track listing ==
All compositions by David "Fathead" Newman except where noted

1. "Visa" (Charlie Parker) – 3:17
2. "Time After Time" (Jule Styne, Sammy Cahn) – 4:58
3. "Shakabu" – 4:08
4. "Song for the New Man" (Pat Rebillot) – 5:36
5. "Passing Through" (Herbie Mann) – 8:58
6. "Fast Lane" – 4:15
7. "Lonesome Head" – 4:33
8. "When I Fall in Love" (Victor Young, Edward Heyman) – 11:26
9. "This I Dig of You" (Hank Mobley) – 5:59

== Personnel ==
- David "Fathead" Newman – tenor saxophone, flute
- Curtis Fuller – trombone (tracks 1, 3 & 6–9)
- John Hicks – piano
- John Menegon – bass
- Jimmy Cobb – drums
