= Portraits in Ivory and Brass =

Studio album by Jack Walrath and Larry Willis
- Released: 1994
- Recorded: June 25 and 26, 1992
- Studio: Mapleshade Studio, Marlborough, MA
- Genre: Jazz
- Length: 58:46
- Label: Mapleshade; 02032
- Producer: Larry Willis, Jack Walrath, Pierre Sprey

Jack Walrath chronology
Gut Feelings (1990)	Portraits in Ivory and Brass (1994)	Serious Hang (1992)

Portraits in Ivory and Brass is an album by trumpeter Jack Walrath with pianist Larry Willis and bassist Steve Novosel which was recorded in 1992 and released on the Mapleshade label in 1994.

Professional ratings
Review scores
Source	Rating
AllMusic	4.5/5 stars

== Track listing ==
All compositions by Jack Walrath except where noted

1. "Bess, You Is My Woman Now" (George Gershwin, Ira Gershwin) – 4:59
2. "Epitaph for Seikolos" – 4:55
3. "Shadows" (Larry Willis) – 10:14
4. "Kirsten" – 9:43
5. "Monk's Feet" – 9:50
6. "Road to Sophia" – 11:42
7. "Blues in F (Improvised)" – 9:30
8. "Green Eyes" (Willis) – 7:47

== Personnel ==
- Jack Walrath – trumpet
- Larry Willis – piano
- Steve Novosel – bass
