= Resurgence! =

Studio album by David "Fathead" Newman
- Released: 1981
- Recorded: September 23, 1980
- Studio: Sound Heights Studio, Brooklyn, NY
- Genre: Jazz
- Length: 41:31
- Label: Muse; MR/MCD 5234
- Producer: Michael Cuscuna

David "Fathead" Newman chronology
Scratch My Back (1979)	Resurgence! (1981)	Still Hard Times (1982)

Resurgence! is an album by American jazz saxophonist David "Fathead" Newman recorded in 1981 and released on the Muse label.

== Reception ==
Professional ratings
Review scores
Source	Rating
AllMusic	4/5 stars

In his review for AllMusic, Scott Yanow stated: "David "Fathead" Newman's first freewheeling recording in a number of years showed that he was certainly capable of playing creative soul-jazz and bop when inspired ... An excellent effort".

== Track listing ==
All compositions by David "Fathead" Newman except where noted

1. "Everything Must Change" (Bernard Ighner) – 4:40
2. "Mama Lou" – 5:50
3. "Davey Blue" – 9:12
4. "Carnegie Blues" (Hank Crawford) – 8:25
5. "Akua Ewie" (Marcus Belgrave) – 6:22
6. "To the Holy Land" (Cedar Walton) – 7:02

== Personnel ==
- David Newman – tenor saxophone, alto saxophone, soprano saxophone, flute
- Marcus Belgrave – trumpet, flugelhorn
- Ted Dunbar – guitar
- Cedar Walton – piano, electric piano
- Buster Williams – bass
- Louis Hayes – drums
