= Under a Woodstock Moon =

Studio album by David Newman
- Released: 1996
- Recorded: June 15–17, 1996
- Studio: Quad Recording Studios, New York, NY
- Genre: Jazz
- Length: 59:04
- Label: Kokopelli; KOKO 1314
- Producer: David Newman

David Newman chronology
| Mr. Gentle Mr. Cool (1994) | Under a Woodstock Moon (1996) | Chillin' (1999) |

Under a Woodstock Moon is an album by American saxophonist David Newman recorded in 1996 and released on Herbie Mann's Kokopelli label.

== Reception ==
Professional ratings
Review scores
| Source | Rating |
|---|---|
| AllMusic | 4/5 stars |

In his review for AllMusic, Scott Yanow states "Veteran David Newman is heard in fine form on his excellent CD, switching between tenor, alto and flute. He is joined by a supportive rhythm section and occasionally four strings for a cheerful set of ballads and originals. ... despite the mostly relaxed tempos, it is one of David Newman's stronger straight-ahead efforts and is easily recommended, particularly for Newman's appealing tenor playing".

== Track listing ==
All compositions by David Newman except where noted

1. "Nature Boy" (eden ahbez) – 4:36
2. "Amandla" – 5:15
3. "Up Jumped Spring" (Freddie Hubbard) – 4:24
4. "Spring Can Really Hang You up the Most" (Tommy Wolf, Fran Landesman) – 5:11
5. "Autumn in New York" (Vernon Duke) – 4:38
6. "Sky Blues" (David Leonhardt) – 2:56
7. "Another Kentucky Sunset" (Leonhardt) – 4:58
8. "Summertime" (George Gershwin, DuBose Heyward, Ira Gershwin) – 4:56
9. "Sunrise" (Leonhardt, Newman) – 5:35
10. "A Nightingale Sang in Berkeley Square" (Manning Sherwin, Eric Maschwitz) – 6:14
11. "Skylark" (Hoagy Carmichael, Johnny Mercer) – 4:49
12. "Under a Woodstock Moon" – 5:32

== Personnel ==
- David Newman – tenor saxophone, alto saxophone, flute
- David Leonhardt – piano, arranger
- Bryan Carrott – vibraphone
- Steve Novosel – bass
- Winard Harper – drums
- String section conducted by Torrie Zito
  - Charles Libove, Eugene Moye, Matthew Raimondi, Ronald Carbone
- Bob Freedman – arranger
