= Discothèque (Herbie Mann album) =

Studio album by Herbie Mann
- Released: 1975
- Recorded: February 12, 1975; NYC
- Genre: Jazz
- Length: 41:29
- Label: Atlantic; SD 1670
- Producer: Herbie Mann

Herbie Mann chronology
| First Light (1973) | Discothèque (1975) | Waterbed (1975) |

Discothèque is an album by flautist Herbie Mann recorded in 1975 and released on the Atlantic label.

== Reception ==
Professional ratings
Review scores
| Source | Rating |
|---|---|
| AllMusic | 2/5 stars |
| Christgau's Record Guide | D+ |

AllMusic awarded the album 2 stars with its review by Jim Newsome stating: "The unfortunate title of this album fed into the perception that jazz great Herbie Mann would jump onto any musical trend for a buck. The hit single "Hi-Jack" actually was pretty good as dance-oriented instrumental pop, but jazz it was not. ...On too many cuts, though, the dated synthesizers and female backing vocals make the mix sound like little more than background music for a shopping mall".

== Track listing ==
1. "Hi-Jack" (Fernando Arbex) - 5:16
2. "Pick Up the Pieces" (Roger Ball, Hamish Stuart, Average White Band) - 5:16
3. "Lady Marmalade" (Bob Crewe, Kenny Nolan) - 4:15
4. "Mediterranean" (Herbie Mann) - 6:23
5. "I Can't Turn You Loose" (Otis Redding) - 3:20
6. "I Won't Last a Day Without You" (Paul Williams, Roger Nichols) - 2:50
7. "High Above the Andes" (Mann) - 6:30
8. "Bird of Beauty" (Stevie Wonder) - 4:30
9. "Guava Jelly" (Bob Marley) - 3:20

== Charts ==
| Chart (1975) | Position |
|---|---|
| Australia (Kent Music Report) | 93 |

== Personnel ==
- Herbie Mann - flute
- Sam Burtis, Barry Rogers - trombone
- Pat Rebillot - keyboards, arranger, conductor
- Jerry Friedman, Bob Mann, Hugh McCracken - guitar
- Tony Levin - bass
- Steve Gadd - drums
- Ray Barretto, Armen Halburian, Ralph MacDonald, Ray Mantilla - percussion
- Cissy Houston, Eunice Peterson, Sylvia Shemwell - backing vocals
