= Lonely Avenue (David Newman album) =

Studio album by David Newman
- Released: 1972
- Recorded: November 2, 3 & 4, 1971; Atlantic Recording Studios, NYC
- Genre: Jazz
- Length: 43:32
- Label: Atlantic; SD 1600
- Producer: Joel Dorn

David Newman chronology
Captain Buckles (1971)	Lonely Avenue (1972)	The Weapon (1972)

Lonely Avenue is an album by American saxophonist David Newman, featuring performances recorded in 1971 for the Atlantic label.

== Reception ==
Professional ratings
Review scores
Source	Rating
Allmusic	3/5 stars

Allmusic awarded the album 3 stars calling it "An OK but not too essential LP".

== Track listing ==
1. "Fuzz" (Roy Ayers) - 7:23
2. "Precious Lord" (Traditional) - 5:25
3. "Symphonette" (David Newman, Charles "Bags" Costello) - 8:50
4. "Lonely Avenue" (Doc Pomus) - 7:14
5. "3/4 of the Time" (Roger Newman) - 7:27
6. "Fire Weaver" (Ayers) - 7:13

== Personnel ==
- David Newman - tenor saxophone, flute
- Roy Ayers - vibraphone, piano, organ
- Charles "Bags" Costello - organ
- Cornell Dupree - guitar
- Bill Salter - bass
- Ray Lucas - drums
- Ralph MacDonald - percussion
