= Cityscape (David "Fathead" Newman album) =

Studio album by David "Fathead" Newman
- Released: January 31, 2006
- Recorded: August 17, 2005
- Studio: M&I Recording Studios, New York, NY
- Genre: Jazz
- Length: 52:20
- Label: HighNote; HCD 7150
- Producer: David "Fathead" Newman, Houston Person

David "Fathead" Newman chronology
| I Remember Brother Ray (2005) | Cityscape (2006) | Life (2007) |

Cityscape is an album by American saxophonist David "Fathead" Newman which was recorded in 2005 and released on the HighNote label early the following year.

== Reception ==
Professional ratings
Review scores
| Source | Rating |
|---|---|
| AllMusic | 3.5/5 stars |
| The Penguin Guide to Jazz Recordings | 3.5/4 stars |

In his review on AllMusic, Thom Jurek states "Cityscape is one of those moments where a veteran jazzman places himself in a setting in order to showcase the music he's made -- David "Fathead" Newman is beginning his sixth decade as a working musician—what he's learned and where he's likely to travel ... Newman's consistency as a bandleader is remarkable and this is yet another session that proves the point. The man is a treasure". In JazzTimes, Chris Kelsey noted "Cityscape proves that Newman hasn’t lost much off his fastball. He’s still a solid, straight-forward improviser, heavy on blues feeling and refreshingly light on frills".

== Track listing ==
All compositions by David "Fathead" Newman except where noted

1. "Goldfinger" (John Barry, Leslie Bricusse, Anthony Newley) – 5:44
2. "Pharoah's Gold" (Claude Joseph Johnson) — 6:39
3. "A Flower Is a Lovesome Thing" (Billy Strayhorn) – 7:04
4. "Bu Bop Bass" – 4:10
5. "Here Comes Sonny Man" – 4:41
6. "It Was a Very Good Year" (Ervin Drake) – 6:03
7. "Flankin" – 6:57
8. "Sheakin' In" – 6:22
9. "Suki Duki" – 4:40

== Personnel ==
- David "Fathead" Newman – tenor saxophone, alto saxophone, flute
- Winston Byrd – flugelhorn, trumpet
- Benny Powell – trombone (tracks 1, 3 & 6–9)
- Howard Johnson – baritone saxophone
- David Leonhardt – piano
- John Menegon – bass
- Yoron Israel – drums
