= Fire! Live at the Village Vanguard =

Live album by David Newman
- Released: 1989
- Recorded: December 22 & 23, 1988
- Venue: Village Vanguard, New York City
- Genre: Jazz
- Length: 45:55 Original LP release
- Label: Atlantic; 81965-1
- Producer: Bob Porter

David Newman chronology
Heads Up (1987)	Fire! Live at the Village Vanguard (1989)	Blue Head (1990)

Fire! Live at the Village Vanguard is a live album by American saxophonist David Newman's Quintet, with guest appearances by Stanley Turrentine and Hank Crawford, recorded at the Village Vanguard in 1988 and released on the Atlantic label.

== Reception ==
Professional ratings
Review scores
Source	Rating
AllMusic	4/5 stars

In his review for AllMusic, Scott Yanow called it: "An enjoyable set of soulful, straight-ahead jazz.".

== Track listing ==
1. "Old Devil Moon" (Burton Lane, E.Y. "Yip" Harburg) – 7:46
2. "Chenya" (David "Fathead" Newman) – 8:33
3. "Slippin' Down" (David Leonhardt) – 6:53
4. "Wide Open Spaces" (Babs Gonzales) – 7:34
5. "Lonely Avenue" (Doc Pomus) – 7:48
6. "Filthy McNasty" (Horace Silver) – 7:21
7. "Blues for Ball" (McCoy Tyner) – 12:34 Additional track on CD release
8. "Hard Times" (Paul Mitchell) – 9:25 Additional track on CD release

== Personnel ==
- David Newman – tenor saxophone, flute
- Stanley Turrentine – tenor saxophone (tracks 2–4)
- Hank Crawford – alto saxophone (tracks 2, 3, 5 & 8)
- Steve Nelson – vibraphone
- Kirk Lightsey – piano
- David Williams – bass
- Marvin "Smitty" Smith – drums
