= Sunshower (Larry Willis album) =

Studio album by Larry Willis
- Released: 2001
- Genre: Jazz
- Length: 59:18
- Labels: Mapleshade Records; 08532

Sunshower is an album by pianist Larry Willis, released in 2001 by Mapleshade Records. On the album, Willis is joined by cellist Kash Killion, bassist Steve Novosel, and drummers Paul Murphy and Steve Berrios.

Track 4, Jackie McLean's "Melody for Melonae", from his album Let Freedom Ring, is incorrectly titled "Little Melonae" on Sunshower.

== Reception ==
Professional ratings
Review scores
Source	Rating
AllMusic	4/5 stars
The Penguin Guide to Jazz	3.5/4 stars

In a review for AllMusic, Alex Henderson called the album "another excellent CD," and praised Killion's cello playing, writing: "Willis gives Killion plenty of room to stretch out, and that's a very good thing, because not only does Killion have a gorgeous sound, he is also an incredibly lyrical and expressive player." Henderson commented: "Sunshower isn't the sort of album in which the musicians spend their time showing us how fast they can play... this post-bop CD is about expression and emotion rather than pyrotechnics... [a] consistently thoughtful CD."

The authors of the Penguin Guide to Jazz Recordings called the album "an intriguing instance of Willis's interest in extending the language of the orthodox piano trio," and stated: "the language of the session is subdued, tonally quite dark, and unhurried. All the better for that... since it allows the pianist's harmonic ideas to linger in the air and not be buried by 'technique'... this is well worth getting."

== Track listing ==
1. "Summer Serenade" (Benny Carter) – 6:10
2. "Soul Eyes" (Mal Waldron) – 10:59
3. "Sunshower" (Nacio Herb Brown/Arthur Freed) – 6:51
4. "Melody for Melonae" (mistitled as "Little Melonae") (Jackie McLean) – 7:35
5. "Horizon" (Larry Willis) – 8:54
6. "Poor Eric" (Larry Willis) – 9:43
7. "Wah-No-Nahné" (Larry Willis) – 9:02

== Personnel ==
- Larry Willis – piano
- Kash Killion – cello
- Steve Novosel – bass
- Paul F. Murphy – drums
- Steve Berrios – drums
