= James Clay (musician) =

- Born: James Earl Clay; September 8, 1935; Dallas, Texas, United States
- Died: January 6, 1995 (aged 59) Dallas, Texas
- Genres: Hard bop, jazz
- Occupation: Musician
- Instruments: Tenor saxophone, flute, alto saxophone

James Earl Clay (September 8, 1935 – January 6, 1995) was an American jazz tenor saxophonist and flutist.

== Early life ==
Clay was born in Dallas, Texas, on September 8, 1935. While in school, Clay played alto saxophone, and then played with local bands from around the age of 17.

== Later life and career ==
Clay moved to California in 1955, where he initially played in jam sessions. He appeared on recordings with Lawrence Marable the following year. Clay then played with freer musicians including Don Cherry, Billy Higgins, and Ornette Coleman, before returning to Dallas in 1958. He joined the military in 1959, and recorded two albums as a leader the following year.

Back in California, he led a quartet with Roosevelt Wardell, Jimmy Bond, and Frank Butler, but soon returned to Texas. He toured with Lowell Fulson in the early 1960s, and with Ray Charles on and off between 1962 and 1977. A reappearance on a recording led by Cherry in 1988 – Art Deco – led to a short resurgence of interest in Clay's career. He died in Dallas, Texas on January 6, 1995, aged 59.

== Playing style ==
Grove wrote that "Clay's style revealed a bop-oriented approach, reminiscent of an angular Lester Young." Clay in the late 1980s said: "Texas tenors are known for playing in a raunchy, straight-forward manner, with lots of emotion and few frills. I'm a typical example of that style of player."

== Discography ==
=== As leader ===
- The Sound of the Wide Open Spaces!!!! (Riverside, 1960) with David Newman, Wynton Kelly, Sam Jones and Art Taylor
- A Double Dose of Soul (Riverside, 1960) with Nat Adderley, Victor Feldman, Gene Harris, Sam Jones and Louis Hayes
- Bill Perkins–James Clay Quintet: The Right Chemistry (Jazz Mark, 1987)
- I Let a Song Go Out of My Heart (Antilles, 1991)
- Cookin' at the Continental (Antilles, 1992)

=== As sideman ===
- Frank Morgan: Frank Morgan (Gene Norman Presents, 1955) (Clay featured on additional tracks not issued on original album, but available on the 1991 complete edition CD)
- The Lawrence Marable Quartet featuring James Clay: Tenorman (Jazz: West, 1956) with Sonny Clark
- Red Mitchell: Presenting Red Mitchell (Contemporary, 1957)
- Wes Montgomery: Movin' Along (Riverside, 1960)
- Hank Crawford: True Blue (Atlantic, 1964)
- Ray Charles: Sweet & Sour Tears (ABC-Paramount, 1964)
- Ray Charles: Have A Smile With Me (ABC-Paramount, 1964)
- Ray Charles: My Kind Of Jazz, Part 3 (Crossover Records, 1975)
- Roger Boykin: Cycles (Soultex Records, 1981)
- The Paul Guerrero Quintet featuring Marchel Ivery and James Clay: Texas Tenors (Jazz Mark, 1985)
- Billy Higgins: Bridgework (Contemporary, 1987)
- Don Cherry: Art Deco (A&M, 1988)
- David "Fathead" Newman: Return to the Wide Open Spaces (Amazing, 1990) with Ellis Marsalis and Cornell Dupree
- Joe McBride: Grace (Heads Up, 1992)
