= Life (David "Fathead" Newman album) =

Studio album by David "Fathead" Newman
- Released: January 30, 2007
- Recorded: September 12, 2006
- Studio: M&I Recording Studios, New York, NY
- Genre: Jazz
- Length: 59:07
- Label: HighNote; HCD 7166
- Producer: David "Fathead" Newman, Houston Person

David "Fathead" Newman chronology
Cityscape (2006)	Life (2007)	Diamondhead (2008)

Life is an album by American saxophonist David "Fathead" Newman, dedicated to pianist John Hicks, which was recorded in 2004 and released on the HighNote label the following year.

== Reception ==
Professional ratings
Review scores
Source	Rating
Allmusic	4/5 stars
All About Jazz	4/5 stars
The Penguin Guide to Jazz Recordings	3/4 stars

In his review on Allmusic, Thom Jurek states: "taste, elegance and soul are the trademarks of everything here. Indeed, as evidenced by Life, Newman's able to turn the trick back inside out and seek new ground inside ballads and standards rather than radically revisioning them. He has always been a player of great feeling and economy, but here, he takes his gifts to an entirely different level. Just beautiful". In JazzTimes, Owen Cordle noted: "David “Fathead” Newman, known for his gritty, Texas tenor solos with the Ray Charles band of the 1950s and ’60s, is also a compelling, sexy ballad player, as this album, his eighth for HighNote, reiterates ... Working with a tasteful, George Shearing Quintet-like rhythm section, Newman benefits from arrangements and colors that give the album classiness beyond a blowing session". On All About Jazz, Terrell Kent Holmes observed: "Even after decades in the music business, it's clear that David "Fathead Newman still has many, many notes left to play. Toward that end Life is a handful of chestnuts on which he displays his formidable triple-threat skills on tenor sax, alto sax and flute ... Newman's intelligence and experience are evident throughout Life, an album which exemplifies a relaxed and timeless excellence".

== Track listing ==
1. "Girl Talk" (Neal Hefti, Bobby Troup) – 6:11
2. "Life" (John Hicks) – 6:59
3. "Alfie" (Burt Bacharach, Hal David) – 5:59
4. "I Can't Get Started" (Vernon Duke, Ira Gershwin) – 6:14
5. "Old Folks" (Willard Robison, Dedette Lee Hill) – 6:46
6. "Autumn in New York" (Vernon Duke) – 6:29
7. "Come Sunday" (Duke Ellington) – 6:18
8. "What a Wonderful World" (George Douglas, George David Weiss) – 7:29
9. "Naima" (John Coltrane) – 6:42

== Personnel ==
- David "Fathead" Newman – tenor saxophone, alto saxophone, flute
- Steve Nelson – vibraphone
- David Leonhardt – piano
- Peter Bernstein – guitar
- John Menegon – bass
- Yoron Israel – drums
