= Heads Up (David Newman album) =

Studio album by David Newman
- Released: 1987
- Recorded: September 16–18, 1986
- Studio: Atlantic Recording Studios, New York, NY
- Genre: Jazz
- Length: 46:21 CD release with bonus track
- Label: Atlantic; 781 725-1
- Producer: John Snyder

David Newman chronology
Still Hard Times (1982)	Heads Up (1987)	Fire! Live at the Village Vanguard (1989)

Heads Up is an album by American saxophonist David Newman recorded in New York City in 1986 and released on the Atlantic label.

== Reception ==
Professional ratings
Review scores
Source	Rating
AllMusic	3/5 stars

In his review for AllMusic, Scott Yanow stated: "Although often placed in more tightly arranged settings throughout his career, Newman really excels in a small-group format, where his soulful tones and expertise at jamming over common chord changes are best displayed. This was one of his better sets, even though the album is not very well known".

== Track listing ==
1. "Ain't Misbehavin'" (Fats Waller, Andy Razaf) – 7:40
2. "Makin' Whoopee" (Walter Donaldson, Gus Kahn) – 8:24
3. "Heads Up" (David Newman) – 6:21
4. "Old Folks" (Willard Robison, Dedette Lee Hill) – 8:12
5. "Delilah" (Clifford Brown) – 7:22
6. "Lover Man" (Jimmy Davis, Ram Ramirez, James Sherman) – 9:52
7. "For Buster" (Newman) – 6:47
8. "New York State of Mind" (Billy Joel) – 8:26 Additional track on CD release

== Personnel ==
- David Newman – tenor saxophone, flute
- Steve Nelson – vibraphone
- Kirk Lightsey – piano
- David Williams – bass
- Eddie Gladden – drums
