= Albert Lee =

English musician (born 1943)

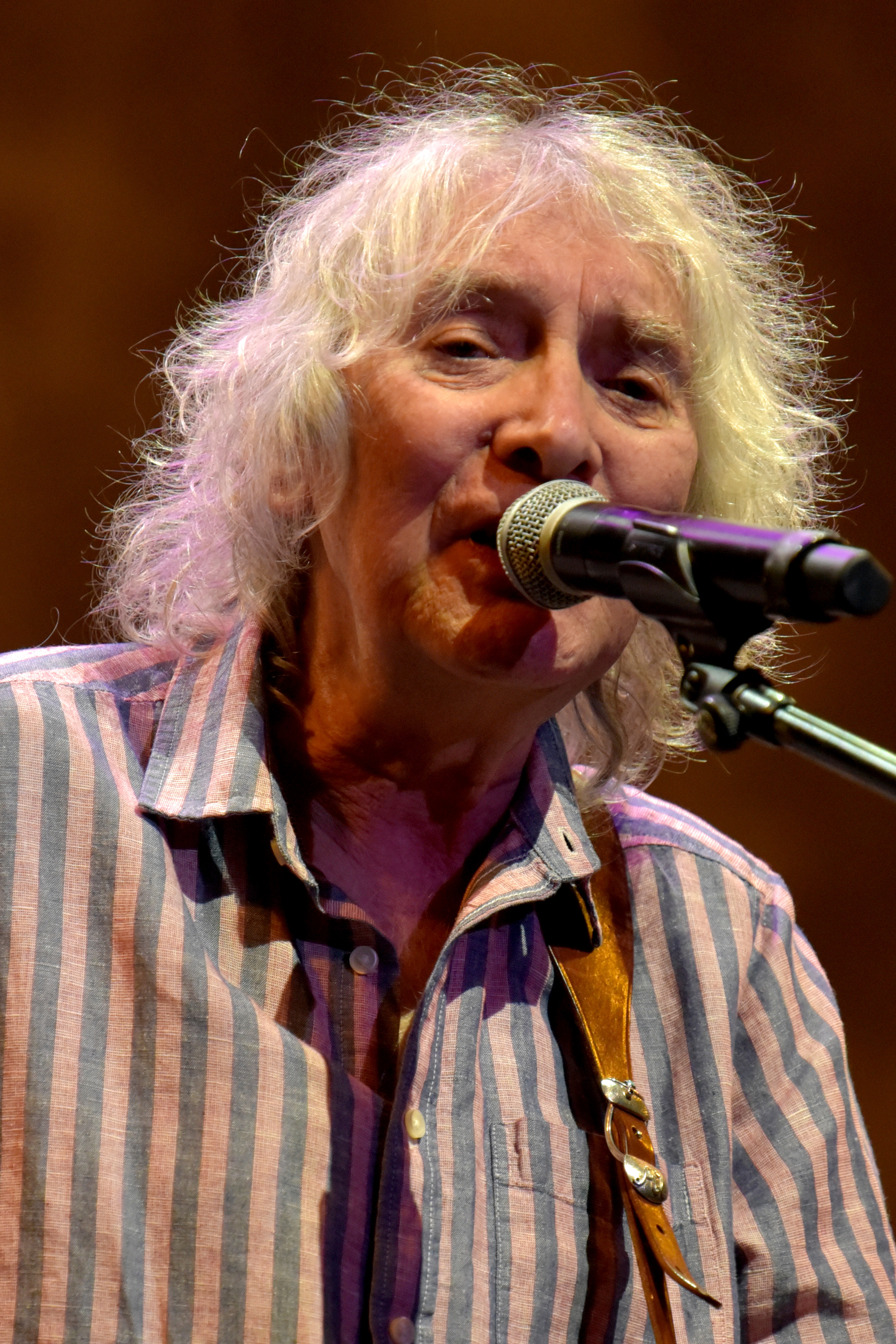
- Lee performing in Los Angeles in 2019

Background information
- Also known as: Mr. Telecaster
- Born: Albert William Lee; 21 December 1943 (age 82); Lingen, Herefordshire, England
- Genres: Americana; country rock; rockabilly; rock and roll; R&B
- Occupations: Musician; songwriter; musical director
- Instruments: Vocals; guitar; piano; mandolin
- Years active: 1959–present
- Labels: A&M; Diamond; MCA; Heroic Records; Castle, Magnum; Polydor; Sugar Hill
- Website: albertleeofficial.com

Albert William Lee (born 21 December 1943) is an English guitarist known for his fingerstyle and hybrid picking technique. Lee has worked, both in the studio and on tour, with many famous musicians from a wide range of genres. He has also maintained a solo career and is a noted composer and musical director.

== Early life ==
Lee was born in Lingen, Herefordshire, but grew up in Blackheath, London, a member of a Romani family. His father was a musician, and Lee studied piano, taking up the instrument at age seven.

During this time, Lee became a fan of Buddy Holly and Jerry Lee Lewis. He took up guitar in 1958 when his parents bought him a second-hand Höfner President which he later traded in for a Czechoslovak Jolana Grazioso, the forerunner of the Futurama. Lee left school at the age of 16 to play full-time.

== Career ==
=== Early career ===
Lee was with a variety of bands from 1959 onwards, playing mostly R&B, country music and rock and roll. He was accompanying Richard Kneller (Dickie Pride) in the Castle Pub in Tooting the night Russ Conway saw him perform there, two weeks before taking Larry Parnes to see Pride. His early guitar influences included, in addition to Buddy Holly, Cliff Gallup, Grady Martin, the Everly Brothers, Scotty Moore, James Burton and Jerry Reed. Lee first experienced commercial success as the lead guitarist with Chris Farlowe and the Thunderbirds. Lee says that he enjoyed playing the Stax-type material, but he really wanted to play country music. Consequently, he left Farlowe and the Thunderbirds in 1968.

During his time playing with Heads Hands & Feet, Lee became a "guitar hero", playing his Fender Telecaster at breakneck speed. Heads Hands & Feet became a popular live band in the UK, making appearances on The Old Grey Whistle Test and also in Europe, where they appeared on the German music programme Beat-Club. In October 1969, 'Country Fever', an RCA package, toured six countries in eleven days, starting at the Nashville Room with the London band, the Kingpins.

=== International success ===
In 1971, Lee performed with Deep Purple's keyboard player Jon Lord on the studio recording of Lord's Gemini Suite. That opus was a follow-up to Deep Purple's Concerto for Group and Orchestra. Ritchie Blackmore had played guitar at the first live performance of the Gemini Suite in September 1970, but declined the invitation to appear on the studio version, which led to the involvement of Lee. Other performers were Yvonne Elliman, Ian Paice, Roger Glover, Tony Ashton and the London Symphony Orchestra conducted by Sir Malcolm Arnold.

Lee left for Los Angeles in 1974 and, through his friend bassist Ric Grech (of Blind Faith), did some session work on three albums with the Crickets who also at the time included Sonny Curtis and Jerry Allison. One of these releases is titled A Long Way From Lubbock. Lee also received many other offers of session work. In 1976, he was asked to join Emmylou Harris's Hot Band, replacing one of his heroes, James Burton, who was returning to perform with Elvis Presley. The Hot Band featured other musicians including Ricky Skaggs and Rodney Crowell. Starting in 1978, Lee worked for five years with Eric Clapton, which included playing and singing for a live concert recording at the Budokan in Japan.

Lee was one of the instigators of the Everly Brothers' 1983 reunion concert in which he played and was its musical director. He played regularly with the Everlys for over twenty years.

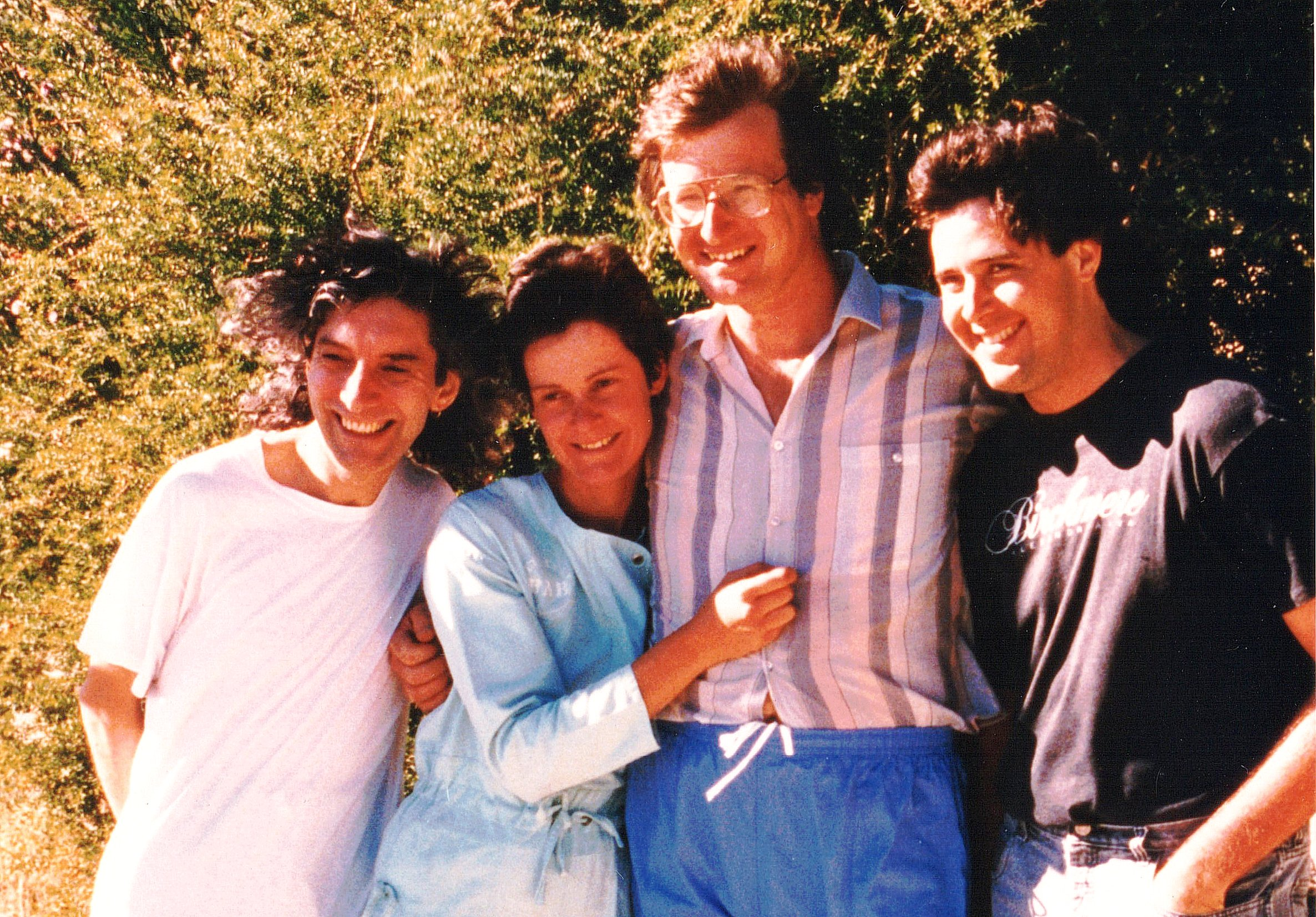
Lee (left) and Vince Gill (right) with tour promoters Ann and Andrew Pattison in Australia, February 1988

In 1987, Lee was invited by Gerry Hogan to headline at a steel guitar festival in Newbury, Berkshire. Lee was at first intimidated by the prospect of having to front a band; however, the gig was successful and he toured as Albert Lee & Hogan's Heroes on a regular basis until 2015. The line-up of the band included British musicians Peter Baron on drums, Gerry Hogan on guitar and Brian Hodgson on bass. Pete Wingfield was the original keyboard player, before leaving to be replaced by Elio Pace and later Gavin Povey.

They were renowned for attracting celebrities to their gigs. Stars such as Eric Clapton, Tommy Emmanuel, Lonnie Donegan, Dave Edmunds, Nick Lowe, Marty Wilde, Willie Nelson, Nanci Griffith, Don Everly, Emmylou Harris, Sonny Curtis and Rodney Crowell have all jammed with the band at one time or another. In 1988 Lee toured Australia along with Vince Gill, then a comparative unknown, and has returned to tour the country on several subsequent occasions.

In the early 2000s, Albert Lee toured with Bill Wyman's Rhythm Kings. In 2002, Lee appeared at the Concert for George [Harrison]. Also in 2002, Lee received a Grammy Award for Best Country Instrumental Performance for "Foggy Mountain Breakdown" from the CD Earl Scruggs and Friends. In September 2006 Lee took part in Primal Twang: The Legacy of the Guitar, a documentary about the history of the guitar. Lee appeared at the 2007 Crossroads Guitar Festival on 28 July and performed with Bill Wyman's Rhythm Kings at the Ahmet Ertegun tribute show at The O2 in London on 10 December. A new album entitled Like This was released in spring 2008 to coincide with their European tour. He is touring in the US and Europe in 2026.

As of January 2026, Lee lives in Malibu, California.

== Awards and legacy ==
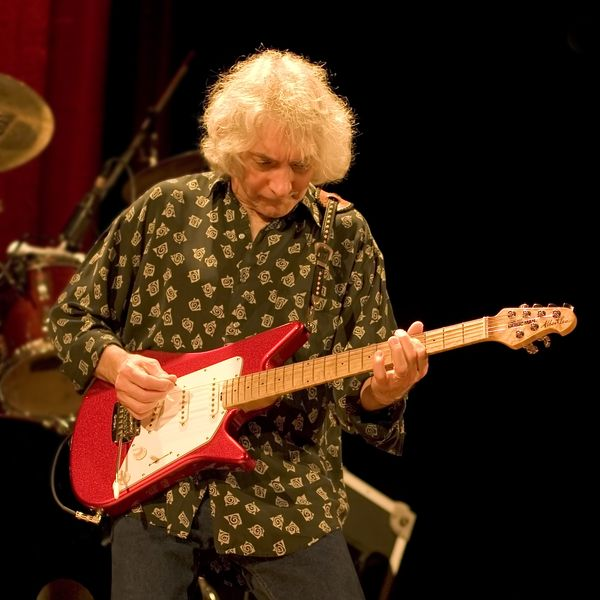
Lee performing in 2006 with one of his signature Music Man guitars.

Lee has received many awards as a guitarist, winning five consecutive times Guitar Player magazine's "Best Country Guitarist". Lee is known within the music industry for his speed of playing and his technical virtuosity and yet by the same token, one of the most melodic, playing slower passages approximating the sound of the pedal steel guitar with his Music Man and Telecaster guitars which are equipped with B-Benders.

He is known as "the guitar player's guitar player". Lee is also referred to as "Mr. Telecaster". A long-time Telecaster player, Lee wrote a foreword to A.R. Duchossoir's book detailing the history of the instrument.

Lee's song "Country Boy" helped to redefine country guitar for a whole generation of players, and was later to become a hit for multi-instrumentalist Ricky Skaggs.

Despite positive press from Melody Maker and New Musical Express, Lee has never achieved any great commercial success in terms of record sales during his career, but more as a live performer, session player and sideman, perhaps due to his self-effacing stage presence. Lee has been described by his peers, who include Jimmy Page and Ritchie Blackmore, as a complete gentleman who does not know the meaning of the word ego.

After Gram Parsons' death, Emmylou Harris was told that she could gain the backing of a major record label only if she could assemble a really "hot band". Harris did just that, enlisting guitarist James Burton and pianist Glen Hardin, both of whom had played with Elvis Presley and Parsons; she named the band "The Hot Band". When Burton left to return to Elvis Presley, Lee was his replacement. Harris said of him that Lee is "a brilliant guitar player. His sound is unmistakable—often emulated, never equaled. When Saint Peter asks me to chronicle my time down here on earth, I'll be able to say (with pride if that's allowed) that for a while I played rhythm guitar in a band with Albert Lee."

In 2017, Lee was honoured with the Trailblazer Lifetime Achievement Award at the UK Americana Awards.

== Guitar collection ==
Albert Lee owns around 40 guitars, including Don Everly's Gibson J-200. The Gibson Guitar Corporation made one for Don Everly and the other for Phil. The guitars have an all black, high-gloss lacquered finish and are equipped with twin Everly Brothers white pickguards. The Everly Brothers' manager Wesley Rose had wanted the guitar to be presented to the Country Music Hall of Fame, but Everly informed him that guitars like that should be played, not kept sitting in a glass case. Don Everly presented it to Lee, along with his Gibson Everly Brothers model.

Eric Clapton gave Lee the Gibson Les Paul Custom that he played while with Delaney and Bonnie. Lee also plays his signature Music Man (the guitar shown in the photographs) and a 1950s Telecaster (and has versions of both with custom B-Benders), a 1958 Stratocaster and a Martin 000-28 acoustic.

Despite his being heavily associated with the Fender Telecaster, guitar manufacturer Ernie Ball Music Man makes a signature Albert Lee guitar, which unlike typical Telecasters is offered with three single-coil or two humbucker pick-ups.

== Band list ==
- Chris Farlowe and the Thunderbirds
- Country Fever
- Green Bullfrog
- Poet and the One Man Band
- Heads Hands & Feet
- The Crickets
- Emmylou Harris and the Hot Band
- Albert Lee and Hogan's Heroes (1987–2015)
- Bill Wyman's Rhythm Kings
- Biffbaby's All Stars (featuring: Albert Lee, Eddie Van Halen, Steve Morse, Steve Lukather; in association with Ernie Ball products)

== Discography ==
=== Albums ===
| Year | Title | Label | Number | Notes |
|---|---|---|---|---|
| 1979 | Hiding | A&M | SP-4750 | |
| 1982 | Albert Lee | Polydor | PD-1-6358 | |
| 1986 | Speechless | MCA | MCA-5693 | |
| 1987 | Gagged but Not Bound | MCA Master Series | MCA-42063 | |
| 1991 | Black Claw & Country Fever | Line | LICD 9.01057 O | |
| 1994 | In Full Flight! Live at Montreaux | Round Tower | RTMCD 60 | with Hogan's Heroes |
| 2002 | Tear It Up | Heroic | HEROIC-0001 | with Hogan's Heroes |
| 2003 | Heartbreak Hill | Sugar Hill | SUG-3977 | |
| 2003 | That's All Right Mama: The Country Fever & Black Claw Sessions | Castle | 06076-81332-2 | |
| 2006 | Road Runner | Sugar Hill | SUG-4011 | |
| 2006 | In Between the Cracks | Heroic | HEROIC-0004 | with Hogan's Heroes |
| 2007 | Live at the New Morning | Heroic | HEROIC-0005 | with Hogan's Heroes |
| 2008 | Like This | Heroic | HEROIC-0006 | with Hogan's Heroes |
| 2012 | Tearing It Up | AIX | AIX 85054 | Blu-ray HD Audio/Video |
| 2014 | Highwayman | Palm Bridge | 0013964743173 | |
| 2019 | Gypsy Man: A Tribute To Buddy Holly | Mann Brothers | 0672975035488 | |
| 2024 | Lay It Down | Palm Bridge | 0676796010969 | |

=== Featured appearances ===
- Poet and the One Man Band – Poet and the One Man Band LP (1969)
- Heads Hands & Feet – Home From Home (The Missing Album) LP (1970 [1995])
- Heads Hands & Feet – Heads, Hands & Feet LP (1971)
- Heads Hands & Feet – Tracks LP (1972)
- Heads Hands & Feet – Old Soldiers Never Die LP (1973)
- Heads Hands & Feet – Let's Get This Show on the Road!
- Heads Hands & Feet – Jack Daniels Rare Old No. 7
- Jon Lord – Gemini Suite
- The Crickets – Long Way From Lubbock, The Crickets and Their Buddies
- Jerry Lee Lewis – The London Sessions
- Bo Diddley – The London Bo Diddley Sessions
- Eddie Harris – E.H. in the U.K. (Atlantic, 1973)
- Herbie Mann – London Underground (Atlantic, 1973), Reggae (Atlantic, 1973), Reggae II (Atlantic, 1973 [1976])
- Emmylou Harris – Luxury Liner, Quarter Moon in a Ten Cent Town, Blue Kentucky Girl, Roses in the Snow, Evangeline, The Ballad of Sally Rose (Guitars, Mandolin)
- Eric Clapton – Just One Night, Another Ticket, Money and Cigarettes
- Rodney Crowell – The Rodney Crowell Collection
- Rosanne Cash – Seven Year Ache
- Ricky Skaggs – Don't Cheat in Our Hometown, Kentucky Thunder
- Earl Scruggs – Earl Scruggs and Friends
- Paul Kennerley – The Legend of Jesse James (Guitars, Vocals, Mandolin)
- Joe Cocker – Stingray
- Nicolette Larson – The Very Best of Nicolette Larson
- John Prine – The Missing Years (Guitar, Mandolin, Piano)
- Dolly Parton – White Limozeen
- John 5 – Death Valley
- Carlene Carter – I Fell in Love
- Foster and Lloyd – Version of the Truth
- Nanci Griffith – I Knew Love
- Hugh Moffatt – Dance Me Outside
- Everly Brothers – Reunion Concert LP (Guitars, Piano, Musical Director) (1983)
- Everly Brothers – EB '84 LP (Guitars) (1984)
- Everly Brothers – Born Yesterday LP (Guitars) (1986)
- Everly Brothers – Some Hearts LP (Guitars) (1988)
- Don Everly – Sunset Towers
- The Refreshments – Cover of Chuck Berry's "Let It Rock"
- Shakin' Stevens – Hot Dog
- Dave Edmunds – "Sweet Little Lisa"
- Marcel Dadi – Nashville Rendez-vous
- Bert Jansch – Heartbreak
- Jerry Scheff – Fire Down Below
- Brad Paisley – Play
- Jackson Browne – Under the Falling Sky, A Child in These Hills
- Jean-Pierre Danel – "Tulsa Time"
- Arlen Roth -Toolin' Around (1993), Telemasters (2019)
- Maestro Alex Gregory – Bach on Steroids (2009)
- Maestro Alex Gregory – Another Millennium (2010)
- Steve Morse – The Introduction (lead guitar in "General Lee"), Stand Up (vocals/guitar in "Rockin' Guitars")
- The Geoff Everett Band – The Quick and the Dead (2012)
- Maestro Alex Gregory – Holy Grail of 7 strings (2013)
- Various Artists – Guitar Heroes: Making History (2015), featuring James Burton, Amos Garrett, Albert Lee, David Wilcox
- Jericho Summer – Night Train (2015), featuring Richard Fortus, Marco Mendoza
- The Return Of Spinal Tap – DVD (As himself, playing on "Break Like The Wind")
