= I Let a Song Go Out of My Heart (album) =

Studio album by James Clay
- Released: 1991
- Studio: Van Gelder
- Genre: Jazz, bebop
- Label: Antilles
- Producer: John Snyder

James Clay chronology
A Double Dose of Soul (1960)	I Let a Song Go Out of My Heart (1991)	Cookin' at the Continental (1992)

I Let a Song Go Out of My Heart is an album by the American musician James Clay, released in 1991.

== Production ==
The album continued a comeback for Clay, who had reemerged on the national jazz scene when Don Cherry asked him in 1988 to play and record with Cherry's group; Clay was inspired by the sound he got at Van Gelder Studio, and elected to use it for I Let a Song Go Out of My Heart. The album was produced by John Snyder. Clay was backed by Billy Higgins on drums, Cedar Walton on piano, and David Williams on bass. Clay's playing was influenced primarily by Sonny Rollins. "I Mean You" is an interpretation of the Coleman Hawkins version of the song. "John Paul Jones" was composed by John Coltrane.

== Critical reception ==
Professional ratings
Review scores
Source	Rating
AllMusic	4/5 stars
MusicHound Jazz: The Essential Album Guide	3/5 stars
The Penguin Guide to Jazz on CD, LP & Cassette	2.5/4 stars

The New York Times said that "Clay plays bass tenor saxophone, mixing blues ideas and insistent single-note phrases with liquid lines that weave their way through be-bop's matrix of harmony and rhythm." The Wall Street Journal stated that "Clay has that smoky Texas tenor sound that's so timelessly appealing, and he's also a former colleague of Ornette Coleman, which makes for interesting style in its full glory". The Hartford Courant opined that Clay's "celebratory sound is pure jazz hedonism."

The Albuquerque Journal noted that the album combines Clay's "experiences with R&B and with straight-ahead and avant-garde jazz styles". The News and Observer said that "there are intimations of harmonic freedom in Mr. Clay's long lines and earthy, full-throated sound." The Omaha World-Herald stated that Clay "is true to the wide-open, bluesy Texas tenor tradition".

== Track listing ==
No.	Title	Length
1.	"Things Ain't What They Used to Be"	5:42
2.	"My Foolish Heart"	8:22
3.	"Rain Check"	6:29
4.	"The Very Thought of You"	6:11
5.	"I Mean You"	6:55
6.	"I Let a Song Go Out of My Heart"	5:04
7.	"Just in Time"	7:17
8.	"I Can't Get Started"	7:08
9.	"John Paul Jones A.K.A. Trane's Blues"	7:05
10.	"Body and Soul"	7:48
