= The Many Facets of David Newman =

Studio album by David Newman
- Released: 1969
- Recorded: March 7, and December 2, 3 & 4, 1968 and February 11, 1969; NYC
- Genre: Jazz
- Label: Atlantic; SD 1524
- Producer: Joel Dorn

David Newman chronology
Bigger & Better (1968)	The Many Facets of David Newman (1969)	Captain Buckles (1971)

The Many Facets of David Newman is an album by American saxophonist David Newman featuring performances recorded in 1968 for the Atlantic label.

== Reception ==
Professional ratings
Review scores
Source	Rating
Allmusic	3/5 stars

Allmusic awarded the album 3 stars stating "The Many Facets of David Newman is less poppish and more blues-oriented with the lengthy "Children of Abraham" showing some passion, but overall the material is rather weak and has not aged very well".

== Track listing ==
All compositions by David Newman except as indicated

1. "Shiloh" - 4:31
2. "We're a Winner" (Curtis Mayfield) - 3:08
3. "Children of Abraham" (William S. Fischer) - 10:08
4. "Headstart" - 2:54
5. "Chained No More" - 6:24
6. "The Funky Way to Treat Somebody" (Calvin Arnold) - 3:07
7. "Sylvia" (Henry Cosby, Sylvia Moy, Stevie Wonder) - 3:19
8. "That's All" (Alan Brandt, Bob Haymes) - 6:10

== Personnel ==
- David Newman - tenor saxophone, alto saxophone, flute
- Melvin Lastie, Ernie Royal - trumpet (tracks 5 & 9)
- Benny Powell - trombone (tracks 5 & 9)
- Paul Ingraham, Julius Watkins - French horn (tracks 3, 5 & 8)
- Jack Knitzer - oboe (tracks 5 & 9)
- Paul Griffin (track 4), George Stubbs (tracks 2, 6 & 7), Joe Zawinul (tracks 1, 3, 5 & 8) - piano
- Billy Butler - guitar (tracks 2, 6 & 7)
- Ron Carter (tracks 5 & 8), Richard Davis (tracks 1 & 3) - bass
- Chuck Rainey - electric bass (tracks 2, 4, 6 & 7)
- Bruno Carr (tracks 1, 3, 5 & 8), Bernard Purdie (tracks 2, 4, 6 & 7) - drums
- Omar Clay - percussion (tracks 3, 5 & 8)
- String section: Sanford Allen, Alfred Brown, Emanuel Green, Charles McCracken, Donald MacCourt, George Marge, Kermit Moore, Gene Orloff, George Ricci and Julius Schachter directed by Selwart Clarke (tracks 3, 5 & 8)
