= Return to the Wide Open Spaces =

Live album by David "Fathead" Newman, Ellis Marsalis and Cornell Dupree
- Released: October 1, 1990
- Recorded: 1990
- Venue: Caravan of Dreams, Fort Worth, Texas
- Genre: Jazz
- Length: 66:26
- Label: Amazing; AMCD-1021
- Producer: Jim Yanaway

David "Fathead" Newman chronology
Blue Greens & Beans (1990)	Return to the Wide Open Spaces (1990)	Bluesiana Triangle (1990)

Ellis Marsalis chronology
Ellis Marsalis Trio (1990)	Return to the Wide Open Spaces (1990)	Jazzy Wonderland (1994)

Cornell Dupree chronology
Coast to Coast (1988)	Return to the Wide Open Spaces (1990)	Can't Get Through (1991)

Return to the Wide Open Spaces is a live album by American saxophonist David "Fathead" Newman, pianist Ellis Marsalis and guitarist Cornell Dupree, recorded at the Caravan of Dreams in 1990 and released on the Amazing label.

== Reception ==
Professional ratings
Review scores
Source	Rating
AllMusic	3/5 stars
Los Angeles Times	2.5/4 stars

In his review for AllMusic, Scott Yanow states, "For this live concert recorded at the Caravan of Dreams in Fort Worth, a mostly all-star group of Texas jazzmen (plus pianist Ellis Marsalis from New Orleans) was gathered together. The music, which includes four blues and three standards among its nine selections, lacks any real surprises. ... Some better planning and the utilization of a few charts (rather than the funcitonal frameworks) would have elevated the pleasing date to a much higher level". The Los Angeles Times said that "there's a lot of good, unpretentious playing here... More originality and less predictability would have improved this date".

== Track listing ==
1. Introduction – 1:26
2. "Buster's Tune" (Buster Smith) – 5:23
3. "Hard Times" (Paul Mitchell) – 8:22
4. "13th Floor" (David "Fathead" Newman) – 7:22
5. "Things Ain't What They Used to Be" (Mercer Ellington, Ted Persons) – 5:18
6. "These Foolish Things" (Jack Stracheyl, Holt Marvell, Harry Link) – 5:05
7. "Two Bones and a Pick" (Aaron Walker) – 6:19
8. "City Lights" (Jimmy McGriff) – 10:03
9. "Lush Life" (Billy Strayhorn) – 7:10
10. "A Night in Tunisia" (Dizzy Gillespie, Frank Paparelli) – 9:58

== Personnel ==
- David "Fathead" Newman – alto saxophone, flute
- Ellis Marsalis – piano
- Cornell Dupree – guitar
- James Clay – tenor saxophone
- Dennis Dotson – trumpet
- Leroy Cooper – baritone saxophone
- Chuck Rainey – bass
- George Rains – drums
