= Still Hard Times =

Studio album by David "Fathead" Newman
- Released: 1982
- Recorded: April 14, 1982
- Studio: Sound Heights Studio, Brooklyn, NY
- Genre: Jazz
- Length: 49:21 CD release with bonus tracks
- Label: Muse; MR/MCD 5283
- Producer: Michael Cuscuna

David "Fathead" Newman chronology
Resurgence! (1981)	Still Hard Times (1982)	Heads Up (1987)

Still Hard Times is an album by American jazz saxophonist David "Fathead" Newman recorded in 1982 and released on the Muse label.

== Reception ==
Professional ratings
Review scores
Source	Rating
AllMusic	4/5 stars

In his review for AllMusic, Scott Yanow stated: "Newman has a particularly strong supporting cast. ... The music is soulful, swinging, and full of honest feeling, with Newman and Crawford heard in prime form".

== Track listing ==
All compositions by David "Fathead" Newman except where noted

1. "Shana" – 4:55
2. "Blisters" (Hank Crawford) – 5:08
3. "One for My Baby (and One More for the Road)" (Harold Arlen, Johnny Mercer) – 5:55
4. "To Love Again" (Crawford) – 4:55
5. "Still Hard Times" – 6:00
6. "Please Send Me Someone to Love" (Percy Mayfield) – 5:47
7. "Shana" [alternative take] – 5:18 Additional track on CD release
8. "To Love Again" [alternative take] (Crawford) – 5:03 Additional track on CD release
9. "Still Hard Times" [alternative take] – 6:20 Additional track on CD release

== Personnel ==
- David Newman – tenor saxophone, alto saxophone, soprano saxophone, flute
- Hank Crawford – alto saxophone (tracks 1, 2, & 4–9)
- Charlie Miller – trumpet (tracks 1, 2, 4, 5 & 7–9)
- Howard Johnson – baritone saxophone (tracks 1, 2, 4, 5 & 7–9)
- Steve Nelson – vibraphone (tracks 3 & 6)
- Larry Willis – piano
- Walter Booker – bass
- Jimmy Cobb – drums
