= A Double Dose of Soul =

Studio album by James Clay
- Released: 1960
- Recorded: October 11, 1960
- Studio: Los Angeles, CA
- Genre: Jazz
- Length: 46:41
- Label: Riverside; RLP 349
- Producer: Orrin Keepnews

James Clay chronology
The Sound of the Wide Open Spaces!!!! (1960)	A Double Dose of Soul (1960)	I Let a Song Go Out of My Heart (1991)

A Double Dose of Soul is the second album by saxophonist/flautist James Clay featuring performances recorded in 1960 and originally released on the Riverside label.

== Reception ==
Professional ratings
Review scores
Source	Rating
Allmusic	4.5/5 stars
The Penguin Guide to Jazz Recordings	3/4 stars

Scott Yanow of Allmusic says, "Clay splits his time between his lyrical flute and tough tenor, proving to be an excellent bop-based improviser".

== Track listing ==
1. "New Delhi" (Victor Feldman) - 6:35
2. "I Remember You" (Victor Schertzinger, Johnny Mercer) - 6:30
3. "Come Rain or Come Shine" (Harold Arlen, Mercer) - 6:33
4. "Pockets" (Nat Adderley) - 5:36
5. "Pavanne" (Feldman) - 6:07
6. "Linda Serene" (Daniel Jackson) - 8:02
7. "Lost Tears"(Jackson) - 4:06
8. "New Delhi" [alternate take] (Feldman) - 3:12 Bonus track on CD reissue
9. "Come Rain or Come Shine" [alternate take] (Arlen, Mercer) - 3:11 Bonus track on CD reissue

== Personnel ==
- James Clay - tenor saxophone, flute
- Nat Adderley - cornet
- Victor Feldman - vibraphone
- Gene Harris - piano
- Sam Jones - bass
- Louis Hayes - drums
