= Captain Buckles =

Studio album by David "Fathead" Newman
- Released: 1971
- Recorded: November 3–5, 1970; Atlantic Recording Studios in NYC
- Genre: Jazz
- Length: 32:45
- Label: Cotillion; SD 18002
- Producer: Joel Dorn

David "Fathead" Newman chronology
The Many Facets of David Newman (1969)	Captain Buckles (1971)	Lonely Avenue (1972)

Captain Buckles is an album by American saxophonist David "Fathead" Newman featuring performances recorded in 1970 and released on the Cotillion label.

== Reception ==
Professional ratings
Review scores
Source	Rating
AllMusic	4/5 stars

AllMusic awarded the album 4 stars with its review by Scott Yanow calling it a "soulful but relatively straight-ahead effort" and "An improvement over David Newman's preceding projects".

== Track listing ==
All compositions by David Newman except as indicated

1. "Captain Buckles" - 4:36
2. "Joel's Domain" - 4:15
3. "Something" (George Harrison) - 3:40
4. "Blue Caper" (Blue Mitchell) - 4:22
5. "The Clincher" - 6:17
6. "I Didn't Know What Time It Was" (Richard Rodgers, Lorenz Hart) - 5:04
7. "Negus" - 5:15

== Personnel ==
- David "Fathead" Newman - tenor saxophone, alto saxophone, flute
- Blue Mitchell - trumpet
- Eric Gale - electric guitar, acoustic guitar
- Steve Novosel - bass
- Bernard Purdie - drums
