= The Gift (David "Fathead" Newman album) =

Studio album by David "Fathead" Newman
- Released: January 21, 2003
- Recorded: October 2, 2002
- Studio: The Studio, New York, NY
- Genre: Jazz
- Length: 48:59
- Label: HighNote; HCD 7104
- Producer: David "Fathead" Newman, Houston Person

David "Fathead" Newman chronology
Davey Blue (2002)	The Gift (2003)	Song for the New Man (2004)

The Gift is an album by American saxophonist David "Fathead" Newman, recorded in 2002 and released on the HighNote label the following year.

== Reception ==
Professional ratings
Review scores
Source	Rating
AllMusic	4/5 stars
The Penguin Guide to Jazz Recordings	3/4 stars

In his review on AllMusic, Scott Yanow states, "Veteran saxophonist David 'Fathead' Newman shows off his versatility on this pleasing soul-jazz date. He plays tenor on four selections and flute on two others, and switches to soprano and alto for one song apiece. ... this CD finds Fathead in prime form, and it is easily recommended to fans of his straight-ahead dates". In JazzTimes, David Franklin noted, "At age 70, veteran saxophonist David 'Fathead' Newman has not even begun to slow down. The Gift (HighNote) finds him still in command of all his considerable talents in a showcase for his soul-drenched tenor, some boppish alto, a bit of funky flute and some meditative soprano".

== Track listing ==
All compositions by David "Fathead" Newman except where noted

1. "The Gift" – 5:44
2. "Don't Let the Sun Catch You Crying" (Gerry Marsden, Freddie Marsden, Les Chadwick, Les Maguire) – 7:14
3. "Off the Hook" – 5:14
4. "Unspeakable Times" – 6:23
5. "Little Sonny's Tune" – 3:55
6. "Lady Day" (L. Johnson) – 6:15
7. "Unchain My Heart" (Bobby Sharp, Teddy Powell) – 5:38
8. "Ksue" – 8:36

== Personnel ==
- David "Fathead" Newman – tenor saxophone, alto saxophone, flute
- John Hicks – piano
- Bryan Carrott – vibraphone
- Buster Williams – bass
- Winard Harper – drums
