= Pat Rebillot =

American jazz pianist and composer (born 1935)

Pat Rebilliot
- Born: Patrick Earl Rebillot; April 21, 1935 (age 90); Louisville, Ohio, U.S.
- Genres: Jazz
- Instrument: Keyboards

Patrick Earl Rebillot (born April 21, 1935) is an American jazz pianist and composer.

== Early life and education ==
Born in Louisville, Ohio, Rebillot studied music at Mt. Union College and the Cincinnati Conservatory of Music with Jeno Takacs. He graduated with a Bachelor of Music Education in 1957.

== Career ==
Rebillot is associated with fellow session and studio musicians Hugh McCracken, Tony Levin, Steve Gadd, Ray Barretto and Ralph MacDonald.

A long-time member of Herbie Mann's various line-ups, for which he is also credited as arranger, Rebillot also appears on recordings by Steely Dan, the Average White Band, Gloria Gaynor, Irene Worth, Bette Midler, Flora Purim, Hall & Oates, David Newman, Jon Faddis, Morrissey–Mullen, Michael Franks, Barbra Streisand, Judy Collins, Carly Simon, The Spinners, Freddy Cole, Laura Lieberman, and Chris Connor. He played live with Paul Winter, Joan Baez, Sarah Vaughan, Liza Minnelli, Anita O'Day, Cissy Houston, Joe Williams, O.C. Smith, Benny Powell, Jimmy Rushing, Zoot Sims, Al Cohn, James Moody, Thad Jones, Mel Lewis, Benny Goodman, Gary Burton, and others.

== Discography ==
=== As leader ===
- Free Fall - with Tony Levin on bass, Steve Gadd on drums, Armen Halburian on percussion and Sam Brown on guitar. Produced by Herbie Mann (1974) - Atlantic Records

=== As sideman ===
With Patti Austin

- Live at the Bottom Line (CTI, 1978)

With Warren Bernhardt

- Manhattan Update (1980)

With James Brown

- Funky President (1974)

With Kvitka Cisyk

- Kvitka, Two Colors (1989)

With Paul Desmond

- From the Hot Afternoon (A&M/CTI, 1969)

With Frank Foster

- Soul Outing! (Prestige, 1966)

With Gloria Gaynor

- I've Got You (1976)

With Mike Gibbs & Gary Burton

- In the Public Interest (1973)

With Hall & Oates

- Abandoned Luncheonette (1973)

With Jaroslav Jakubovic

- Checkin' In (Columbia, 1978)

With Robin Kenyatta

- Gypsy Man (Atlantic, 1973)

With John Klemmer

- Arabesque (1978)

With Chuck Loeb

- My Shining Hour (1988)

With Charlie Mariano

- Mirror (1972)

With Herbie Mann

- Hold On, I'm Comin' (Atlantic, 1973)
- Turtle Bay (Atlantic, 1973)
- London Underground (Atlantic, 1973)
- Reggae (Atlantic, 1973)
- First Light (Atlantic, 1974) as Family of Mann
- Discothèque (Atlantic, 1975)
- Waterbed (Atlantic, 1975)
- Surprises (Atlantic, 1976)
- Reggae II (Atlantic, 1973 [1976])
- Gagaku & Beyond (Finnadar/Atlantic, 1974 [1976])
- Brazil: Once Again (Atlantic, 1977)

With Arif Mardin

- Journey (Atlantic, 1974)

With David Matthews

- Shoogie Wanna Boogie (1976)

With Jimmy McGriff

- Red Beans (Groove Merchant, 1976)
- Tailgunner (LRC, 1977)
- Outside Looking In (LRC, 1978)

With Morrissey–Mullen

- Up (1977)

With Meco

- Encounters of Every Kind (1977)

With Mark Murphy

- Bridging a Gap (Muse, 1972)
- What a Way to Go (Muse, 1990)

With David Newman

- Newmanism (Atlantic, 1974)
- Mr. Fathead (Atlantic, 1976)
- Concrete Jungle (Prestige, 1978)

With Chico O'Farrill

- Nine Flags (Impulse!, 1966)

With Jimmy Ponder

- All Things Beautiful (LRC, 1978)

With Don Sebesky

- The Rape of El Morro (CTI, 1975)

With Steely Dan

- Gaucho (MCA, 1980)

With Joe Thomas

- Masada (1975)
- Feelin's From Within (1976)
- Here I Come (1977)

With Michael Franks

Passion Fruit (1983)
