= Keep the Spirits Singing =

Studio album by David "Fathead" Newman
- Released: January 23, 2001
- Recorded: March 21, 2000
- Studio: M&I, New York City, NY
- Genre: Jazz
- Length: 52:11
- Label: HighNote; HCD 7057
- Producer: David "Fathead" Newman, Houston Person

David "Fathead" Newman chronology
Chillin' (1999)	Keep the Spirits Singing (2001)	Davey Blue (2001)

Keep the Spirits Singing is an album by American saxophonist David "Fathead" Newman, recorded in 2000 and released on the HighNote label the following year.

== Reception ==
Professional ratings
Review scores
Source	Rating
AllMusic	4/5 stars
The Penguin Guide to Jazz Recordings	3.5/4 stars

In his review for AllMusic, Scott Yanow states, "David 'Fathead' Newman is in top form throughout this straight-ahead jazz set ... The music is mostly soulful hard bop and quite well played". In JazzTimes, Miles Jordan noted, "This lively group gets off to a swinging start on the title track ... Besides tenor, Newman also plays flute on two tunes ... As might be expected from a Texas tenorman, Newman’s flute playing is as robust as his other axe(s), which also includes alto sax".

== Track listing ==
1. "Keep the Spirits Singing" (O'Donel Levy) – 6:22
2. "Mellow-D for Mr. C" (Steve Turre) – 9:32
3. "Cousin Esau" (David "Fathead" Newman) – 7:39
4. "Karen My Love" (Newman) – 7:33
5. "Willow Weep for Me" (Ann Ronell) – 7:43
6. "Life" (John Hicks) – 7:53
7. "Asia Beat" (Levy) – 5:29

== Personnel ==
- David "Fathead" Newman – tenor saxophone, alto saxophone, flute
- Steve Turre – trombone (tracks 1, 2 & 7)
- John Hicks – piano
- Steve Novosel – bass
- Winard Harper – drums
- Steve Kroon – percussion (tracks 1, 2 & 7)
