= The Weapon (album) =

Studio album / Live album by David Newman
- Released: 1973
- Recorded: September 25–28, 1972
- Studio: Atlantic Recording Studios (NYC); Regent Sound Studios (NYC); Maxine's Starlight Lounge (Newark, NJ)
- Genre: Jazz
- Length: 32:45
- Label: Atlantic; SD 1638
- Producer: Joel Dorn

David Newman chronology
Lonely Avenue (1972)	The Weapon (1973)	Newmanism (1974)

The Weapon is an album by American jazz saxophonist David Newman featuring performances recorded in 1972 for the Atlantic label.

== Reception ==
Professional ratings
Review scores
Source	Rating
Allmusic	3/5 stars

Allmusic awarded the album 3 stars stating "Despite its flaws and imperfections, The Weapon is recommended to those who like their jazz laced with a lot of R&B".

== Track listing ==
1. "Missy" (David Newman) - 5:29
2. "Seems Like I Gotta Do Wrong" (Dee Ervin) - 4:22
3. "You Can't Always Get What You Want" (Mick Jagger, Keith Richards) - 7:00
4. "Yes We Can Can" (Allen Toussaint) - 3:51
5. "Happy Times" (Toussaint, Cosimo Matassa) - 4:01
6. "Drown in My Own Tears" (Henry Glover) - 4:37
7. "Freedom for the Stallion" (Toussaint) - 3:25

== Personnel ==
- David Newman - tenor saxophone, alto saxophone, flute
- Mac Rebennack - piano, organ
- Richard Tee - organ
- Cornell Dupree, David Spinozza - guitar
- Chuck Rainey - electric bass
- Charles Collins, Jimmy Johnson, Bernard Purdie - drums
- Ralph MacDonald - percussion
- Unidentified string section conducted by Gene Orloff (tracks 2 & 7)
- Ernie Royal (tracks 5 & 6), Joe Wilder (tracks 5 & 6), Wilmer Wise (track 3) - trumpet
- Daniel Orlock - cornet (track 3)
- Robert Moore - trombone (track 3)
- Paul Ingraham - French horn (track 3)
- Jonathan Dorn - tuba (track 3)
- Frank Wess - alto saxophone (tracks 5 & 6)
- Seldon Powell - tenor saxophone (tracks 5 & 6)
- The Sweet Inspirations: Jeanette Brown, Judy Clay, Myrna Smith, Sylvia Shemwell - backing vocals (tracks 2–4 & 7)
