= I Remember Brother Ray =

Studio album by David "Fathead" Newman
- Released: January 11, 2005
- Recorded: August 14, 2004
- Studio: Van Gelder Studio, Englewood Cliffs, NJ
- Genre: Jazz
- Length: 50:39
- Label: HighNote; HCD 7135
- Producer: David "Fathead" Newman, Houston Person

David "Fathead" Newman chronology
Song for the New Man (2004)	I Remember Brother Ray (2005)	Cityscape (2006)

I Remember Brother Ray is an album by American saxophonist David "Fathead" Newman, paying tribute to his bandleader and mentor Ray Charles, which was recorded in 2004 by recording engineer Tobi Nova at Murphy's Place, a jazz club in Toledo, Ohio, and released on the HighNote label the following year.

== Reception ==
Professional ratings
Review scores
Source	Rating
Allmusic	3.5/5 stars
All About Jazz	3.5/5 stars
The Penguin Guide to Jazz Recordings	3/4 stars

In his review on Allmusic, Thom Jurek states "If ever a musician had a pedigree for simultaneously lamenting and celebrating the late Ray Charles, David "Fathead" Newman does. Newman met Charles in 1952 and was a working member of his band from 1954-1964. ... Newman's signature Southern soul tone, saturated in warmth and emotion, is by turns buttery, fat, and back-porch tender. From the opening chorus of "Hit the Road, Jack," one can feel the great control Newman has over the dynamic quality of these tunes. He treats them as classics, albeit very familiar ones. He finds no need to force anything here, knowing that the tunes themselves provide all the inspirational magic necessary. Newman also stays close to the soul-drenched bone despite the sophistication of the arrangements and performances. ... This is a winner through and through". In JazzTimes, Owen Cordle noted "Newman salutes his former boss and mentor with an album of personal highlights of their collaboration. Newman’s dark, dry tone, soulful phrasing and vibrato, and cool manner of falling off notes in this all-tenor date are mighty inviting. ... These are all fine performances. They demonstrate that economy and nuance can carry plenty of emotional juice. They also suggest why Charles held Newman in such high regard". on All About Jazz, John Kelman observed: "While there will undoubtedly be many tributes in the near future, few discs will equal I Remember Brother Ray for its grace, honesty, and pure connection to the true essence of Charles' legacy". In The Observer, Dave Gelly wrote: "With the new Ray Charles biopic in the headlines, we can expect an avalanche of 'tribute' CDs by all and sundry, but Newman really has the right credentials. He worked with the man for more than a decade and it was his laconic tenor saxophone that put extra spice into such classic albums as Ray Charles at Newport ... He plays like a singer, stating the melody with broad strokes and making it his own with turns of phrase and elegant little asides. With a just rhythm section and vibraphone for accompaniment, he has everything he needs to create an eloquent and memorable set".

== Track listing ==
1. "Hit the Road Jack" (Percy Mayfield) – 5:44
2. "Georgia On My Mind" (Hoagy Carmichael, Stuart Gorrell) – 7:20
3. "When Your Lover Has Gone" (Einar Aaron Swan) – 5:05
4. "Drown in My Tears" (Henry Glover) – 6:15
5. "'Deed I Do" (Fred Rose, Walter Hirsch) – 5:27
6. "It Had to Be You" (Isham Jones, Gus Kahn) – 5:32
7. "Ruby" (Mitchell Parish, Heinz Roemheld) – 9:44
8. "Them That Got (I Ain't Got Nothing Yet)" (Ray Charles, Ricci Harper) – 5:32

== Personnel ==
- David "Fathead" Newman – tenor saxophone
- John Hicks – piano
- Steve Nelson – vibraphone
- John Menegon – bass
- Winard Harper – drums
- Tobi Nova – recording engineer
