= First Light (Family of Mann album) =

Studio album by The Family of Mann
- Released: 1974
- Recorded: 1973
- Studio: Record Plant, Los Angeles
- Genre: Crossover jazz, Soul jazz
- Label: Atlantic; SD 1658

Herbie Mann chronology
Reggae (1973)	First Light (1974)	Discothèque (1975)

First Light is an album by flautist Herbie Mann's group The Family of Mann recorded in 1973 and released on the Atlantic label.

== Reception ==
Professional ratings
Review scores
Source	Rating
AllMusic	4/5 stars

AllMusic awarded the album 4 stars with its review by Jim Newsome stating: "This album is more laidback than most of the Mann catalog from the era, with the rhythmic variations and complementary interplay between the musicians contributing to the feeling of a real band. First Light is one of the classiest and most unified recordings of Herbie Mann's long career".

== Track listing ==
1. "Toot Stick" (Herbie Mann) - 2:20
2. "Davey Blue" (David Newman) - 4:38
3. "Daffodil" (Tony Levin) - 2:58
4. "The Turtle and the Frog" (Steve Gadd) - 2:40
5. "Muh Hoss Knows the Way" (Sam Brown) - 2:18
6. "Music Is a Game We Play" (Levin) - 4:37
7. "Sunrise Highs" (Brown) - 9:17
8. "Thank You Mr. Rushing" (Pat Rebillot) - 3:05
9. "Mexicali" (Mann) - 4:17
10. "Lullaby for Mary Elizabeth" (Gadd) - 3:00

== Personnel ==
- Herbie Mann - flute
- David Newman - tenor saxophone, flute
- Pat Rebillot - keyboards
- Sam Brown - guitar
- Tony Levin - bass
- Steve Gadd - drums, kalimba, knees
- Armen Halburian - percussion
- Carlos "Patato" Valdes - congas (track 1)
