= Front Money =

Studio album by David Newman
- Released: 1977
- Recorded: 1977
- Studios: Dalsonic Recording, Dallas, Texas
- Genre: Jazz
- Length: 39:10
- Labels: Warner Bros. BS 2984
- Producer: Joel Dorn for the Masked Announcer

David Newman chronology
Mr. Fathead (1976)	Front Money (1977)	Concrete Jungle (1978)

Front Money is an album by American jazz saxophonist David Newman recorded in 1977 and released on the Warner Bros. label.

Professional ratings
Review scores
Source	Rating
AllMusic	3/5 stars

== Track listing ==
All compositions by David "Fathead" Newman except where noted

1. "Amazing Grace" (Traditional) – 5:06
2. "Sneakin' In" – 6:44
3. "Still Hard" – 6:12
4. "Front Money" (Claude Johnson) – 4:58
5. "Pharoah's Gold" (Johnson) – 5:16
6. "So Fine – So Fine" (Roger Boykin) – 6:04
7. "Suki Duki" (Boykin) – 4:50

== Personnel ==
- David Newman – tenor saxophone, alto saxophone, soprano saxophone, flute, vocals, arranger
- Roger Boykin – bass, guitar, arranger
- William Richardson – drums, percussion
- Claude Johnson – piano, baritone saxophone, arranger
- Adolpho Washington – congas
- Cleveland Gay – trombone
- Arnold Blair – vocals (tracks 1 & 6)
