= Newmanism =

Studio album by David Newman
- Released: 1974
- Recorded: 1974
- Studio: Atlantic Recording Studios, NYC
- Genre: Jazz
- Length: 44:49
- Label: Atlantic; SD 1662
- Producer: Jonathan Dorn

David Newman chronology
The Weapon (1973)	Newmanism (1974)	Mr. Fathead (1976)

Newmanism is an album by American jazz saxophonist David Newman released on the Atlantic label in 1974.

== Reception ==
Professional ratings
Review scores
Source	Rating
Allmusic	3/5 stars

Allmusic awarded the album 3 stars.

== Track listing ==
All compositions by David Newman except as indicated

1. "Baby Rae" - 6:51
2. "Song for the New Man" (Pat Rebillot) - 5:00
3. "Violet Don't Be Blue" (Rebillot) - 5:00
4. "Foxy Brown" (Roy Ayers) - 4:59
5. "Newmanism" - 5:36
6. "Sweet Tears" (Ayers) - 5:26
7. "Let Me Know" (Rebillot) - 5:52
8. "Brandy" - 6:05

== Personnel ==
- David Newman - soprano saxophone, tenor saxophone, flute, arranger
- Roy Ayers - vibraphone
- Pat Rebillot - electric piano
- Ron Carter - bass, electric bass
- Andrew Smith or Roy Brooks - drums
- Armen Halburian - percussion
- Rondo H. Slade - lyrics and words
