= Serious Hang =

Studio album by Jack Walrath and Masters of Suspense
- Released: 1994
- Recorded: April 4, 1992
- Studio: Van Gelder Studio, Englewood Cliffs, NJ
- Genre: Jazz
- Length: 51:47
- Label: Muse; MCD 5475
- Producer: Jack Walrath

Jack Walrath chronology
Portraits in Ivory and Brass (1992)	Serious Hang (1994)	Journey, Man! (1995)

Serious Hang is a live album by trumpeter Jack Walrath which was recorded in 1992 and released on the Muse label in 1994.

== Reception ==
Professional ratings
Review scores
Source	Rating
AllMusic	4/5 stars

The AllMusic review by Ron Wynn stated "Jack Walrath and his Masters of Suspense turn to an idiom that was once among jazz's more popular, but in recent years has been almost ignored -- funk/soul-jazz. ... Walrath's trumpet and flugelhorn horn solos are always intense and occasionally exciting ... the Masters of Suspense do a good job of displaying their soul-jazz chops".

== Track listing ==
All compositions by Jack Walrath except where noted

1. "Anya and Liz on the Veranda" – 6:36
2. "Get on the Good Foot" (James Brown, Fred Wesley, Joe Mims) – 5:11
3. "Better Get Hit in Yo' Soul" (Charles Mingus) – 8:06
4. "Izlyal e Delyo Haidoutin (Haidouk Delyo Has Joined the Rebels)" (Traditional) – 7:29
5. "Monk's Feet" – 6:50
6. "Decisions" (Don Pullen) – 3:04
7. "Gloomy Sunday" (Rezsö Seress, Sam M. Lewis) – 6:31
8. "Weird and Wonderful" – 8:08

== Personnel ==
- Jack Walrath – trumpet, flugelhorn
- Don Pullen – piano
- David Fiuczynski – guitar
- Michael Formanek – bass
- Cecil Brooks III – drums
