= Gagaku & Beyond =

Studio album by Herbie Mann
- Released: 1976
- Recorded: April 1 & 14, 1974
- Studio: Mori Studios, Tokyo, Japan
- Genre: Jazz fusion, World music
- Length: 48:58
- Label: Finnadar/Atlantic; SR 9014
- Producer: Herbie Mann

Herbie Mann chronology
Bird in a Silver Cage (1976)	Gagaku & Beyond (1976)	Herbie Mann & Fire Island (1977)

Gagaku & Beyond is an album by jazz flautist Herbie Mann featuring shakuhachi player Minoru Muraoka which was recorded in Japan in 1974 but only released on Atlantic Records' subsidiary label, Finnadar, in 1976.

== Reception ==
Professional ratings
Review scores
Source	Rating
Allmusic	3/5 stars

Allmusic awarded the album 3 stars stating: "Gagaku & Beyond had Mann working in the world music fusion genre with great success long before new age or "world music" were ever marketing catch phrases. ...this is, along with Mann's more soul- and bossa-oriented recordings, one of his most essential works: groundbreaking, heartrendingly beautiful, and full of deep, contemplative soul".

== Track listing ==
1. "Shomyo (Monk's Chant)" (Traditional) – 14:23
2. "Mauve Over Blues" (Pat Rebillot) – 12:59
3. "Kurodabushi (Sake Drinking Song)" (Traditional) – 5:25
4. "Etenraku" (Traditional) – 8:50
5. "Gagaku and Beyond" (Herbie Mann) – 7:21

== Personnel ==
- Herbie Mann – flute
- Pat Rebillot – keyboards
- Sam Brown – guitar
- Tony Levin – bass
- Steve Gadd – drums

With:

- On tracks 1–3 – Minoru Muraoka and His New Dimension:
  - Minoru Muraoka – shakuhachi
  - Yosei Sato – shō
  - Eriko Kuramoto, Harumi Nakamura, Kazuko Tsubamoto – koto
  - Somei Sasaki – shamisen
  - Kisuku Katada – o-daiko
  - Hiromitsu Katada – taiko
- On track 1 – Modern Shomyo Study Group:
  - Junsen Kitani, Junsho Matsumoto, Kenei Muramatsu, Ryusho Tsurutaka – vocals
- On track 4 – Ono Gagaku Society:
  - Ryoya Ono – leader
  - Goro Ibeke – gaku so
  - Akihiko Ue – gaku-biwa
  - Yoshio Togi – hichiriki
  - Kiyohiko Yamada – ryūteki
  - Shigeru Iwanami – shō
  - Tkashi Ono – shōko
  - Kiichiro Togi – taiko
