= London Underground (album) =

Studio album by Herbie Mann
- Released: February 25, 1974
- Recorded: 1973
- Studio: Advision, London
- Genre: Jazz
- Length: 44:37
- Label: Atlantic; SD 1648
- Producer: Geoffrey Haslam

Herbie Mann chronology
Turtle Bay (1973)	London Underground (1974)	Reggae (1973)

London Underground is an album by flautist Herbie Mann recorded in London in 1973 and released on the Atlantic label. The album features Mann with British rock musicians performing versions of contemporary British hit singles.

== Reception ==
Professional ratings
Review scores
Source	Rating
Allmusic	3/5 stars
The Penguin Guide to Jazz Recordings	2.5/4 stars

The Allmusic site awarded the album 3 stars stating: "There are a couple of clunkers here ("Layla" doesn't work), but for fans of late-'60s/early-'70s rock, not a bad ride". The Penguin Guide to Jazz Recordings gave the album 2.5 stars describing it as "Mostly pop tracks with a group of London rockers".

== Track listing ==
1. "Bitch" (Mick Jagger, Keith Richards) - 8:21
2. "Something in the Air" (Speedy Keen) - 3:34
3. "Layla" (Eric Clapton, Jim Gordon) - 8:08
4. "Spin Ball" (Paddy Kingsland) - 1:57
5. "Mellow Yellow" (Donovan Leitch) - 3:15
6. "A Whiter Shade of Pale" (Gary Brooker, Keith Reid) - 4:46
7. "Memphis Spoon Bread & Dover Sole" (Herbie Mann) - 3:50
8. "Paper Sun" (Jim Capaldi, Steve Winwood) - 6:41
9. "You Never Give Me Your Money" (John Lennon, Paul McCartney) - 4:05

== Personnel ==
- Herbie Mann - flute
- Pat Rebillot - keyboards
- Albert Lee - electric guitar, acoustic guitar
- Mick Taylor - guitar (tracks 1–3, 6 & 7)
- Al Gorry (track 5), Calvin "Fuzzy" Samuels (tracks 1–4 & 6–8) - bass
- Aynsley Dunbar (tracks 1, 3–5, 7 & 8), Robbie McIntosh (tracks 2 & 6) - drums
- Armen Halburian - percussion (track 8)
- Ian McDonald - alto saxophone (track 1)
- Stéphane Grappelli - violin (track 5)

Technical

- Gary Martin - engineer
- Ahmet Ertegun - executive producer
- Paulo Bisacca - art direction, design
- Giuseppe Pino - photography
