= Davey Blue =

Studio album by David "Fathead" Newman
- Released: January 22, 2002
- Recorded: May 31, 2001
- Studio: M&I, NYC
- Genre: Jazz
- Length: 53:35
- Label: HighNote; HCD 7086
- Producer: David "Fathead" Newman, Houston Person

David "Fathead" Newman chronology
Keep the Spirits Singing (2001)	Davey Blue (2002)	The Gift (2003)

Davey Blue is an album by American saxophonist David "Fathead" Newman, recorded in 2001 and released on the HighNote label early the following year.

== Reception ==
Professional ratings
Review scores
Source	Rating
AllMusic	4/5 stars
The Penguin Guide to Jazz Recordings	3/4 stars

In his review on AllMusic, Scott Yanow states: "This excellent session does a fine job of showing off David 'Fathead' Newman's jazz talents. ... sounding at his prime on each of his instruments. Recommended". In JazzTimes, David Franklin noted, "It’s hard to fault listeners for thinking of David 'Fathead' Newman as only a great rhythm and blues tenor player, since many of his short solos on famous Ray Charles recordings have become classics in their own right. But Newman regrets that more people don't realize he is at heart a straightahead, mainstream player who just happened to be there in the mid-'50s when Charles needed a Texas tenor. If his own previous releases didn't set the record straight, Davey Blue just might".

== Track listing ==
All compositions by David "Fathead" Newman except where noted

1. "Cellar Groove" (Norris Austin) – 6:10
2. "Cristo Redentor" (Duke Pearson) – 6:47
3. "For Stanley" – 5:33
4. "A Child Is Born" (Thad Jones) – 5:49
5. "Black" (Cedar Walton) – 5:34
6. "Amandla" – 4:17
7. "Davey Blue" – 13:00
8. "Freedom Jazz Dance" (Eddie Harris) – 6:25

== Personnel ==
- David "Fathead" Newman – tenor saxophone, alto saxophone, flute
- Cedar Walton – piano
- Bryan Carrott – vibraphone
- David Williams – bass
- Kenny Washington – drums
