= Surprises (album) =

Studio album by Herbie Mann
- Released: 1976
- Recorded: 1973–76
- Studio: Dynamic, Kingston, Jamaica; Mori, Tokyo, Japan; Mediasound, New York City; Atlantic, New York City
- Genre: Jazz fusion, rhythm and blues
- Length: 39:44
- Label: Atlantic; SD 1682
- Producer: Herbie Mann

Herbie Mann chronology
| Waterbed (1975) | Surprises (1976) | Reggae II (1976) |

Surprises is an album by jazz flautist Herbie Mann featuring singer Cissy Houston which was released on the Atlantic label in 1976.

== Reception ==
Professional ratings
Review scores
| Source | Rating |
|---|---|
| Allmusic | 3/5 stars |
| The Rolling Stone Jazz Record Guide | 2/5 stars |

The Allmusic site awarded the album 3 stars.

== Track listing ==
All compositions by Herbie Mann except as indicated

1. "Draw Your Breaks" (Derrick Harriott, David Scott) – 4:50
2. "Cajun Moon" (JJ Cale) – 6:17
3. "Creepin" (Stevie Wonder) – 5:00
4. "Easter Rising" (Pat Rebillot, Pat Kirby) – 4:40
5. "Asa Branca" (Luiz Gonzaga, Humberto Teixeira, Divina Eulália Oliveira) – 3:55
6. "The Sound of Windwood" – 2:34
7. "Cricket Dance" – 4:17
8. "The Butterfly in a Stone Garden" – 5:19
9. "Anata (I Wish You Were Here with Me)" (Akiko Kosaka) – 3:07

== Personnel ==
- Herbie Mann – flute
- Minoru Muraoka – shakuhachi (track 6)
- Yosei Sato – shō (tracks 6 & 8)
- David "Fathead" Newman – tenor saxophone (tracks 1–3)
- Pat Rebillot – keyboards
- Gladstone Anderson – piano (track 1)
- Winston Wright – organ (track 1)
- Hux Brown (track 1), Sam Brown (track 6), Radcliffe "Dougie" Bryan (track 1), Jerry Friedman (tracks 2–4, 7 & 9), Bob Mann (track 3–5, 7 & 8), Hugh McCracken (track 2), Jeff Mironov (track 5) – guitar
- Eriko Kuramoto, Harumi Nakamaru, Kazuko Tsubamoto – koto (tracks 6 & 8)
- Somei Sasaki – shamisen (tracks 6 & 8)
- Bob Babbitt (track 4), Jackie Jackson (track 1) Tony Levin (tracks 2, 3 & 5–9) – bass
- Steve Gadd (tracks 2, 3 & 6–9), Rick Marotta (tracks 4 & 5), Michael Richards (track 1) – drums
- Raphael Cruz (track 5), Sammy Figueroa (track 5), Armen Halburian (tracks 2–9), Ralph MacDonald (tracks 2 & 3) – percussion
- Seiko Fujisya, Kisaku Katada, Hiromitsu Katada – taiko (tracks 6 & 8)
- Cissy Houston (tracks 1–5), Akiko Kosaka (track 9) – vocals
- Eunice Peterson, Rannelle Braxton – backing vocals (track 1)
- David Nadien, Gene Orloff, Guy Lumia, Richard Sortomme – violin (track 4)
- Emanuel Vardi, Richard Maximoff – viola (track 4)
- Charles McCracken, Jesse Levy – cello (track 4)

== Charts ==
| Chart (1976) | Peak position |
|---|---|
| US Billboard Top LPs | 178 |
| US Billboard Top Soul LPs | 56 |
| US Billboard Top Jazz Albums | 32 |

== Liner notes ==
From the liner notes: "Cissy Houston. Only now is she beginning to emerge from her cocoon after so many years with the Drinkards and the Sweet Inspirations. Cissy...is showcased here like a star-in-waiting."

== See also ==
- Herbie Mann discography
