= Waterbed (album) =

Studio album by Herbie Mann
- Released: 1975
- Recorded: 1975
- Studio: Atlantic, New York City; Mediasound, New York City
- Genre: Jazz
- Length: 37:26
- Label: Atlantic; SD 1676
- Producer: Herbie Mann

Herbie Mann chronology
Discothèque (1975)	Waterbed (1975)	Surprises (1976)

Waterbed is an album by flautist Herbie Mann recorded in 1975 and released on the Atlantic label.

== Reception ==
Professional ratings
Review scores
Source	Rating
Allmusic	2/5 stars

The Allmusic site awarded the album 2 stars stating: "Many jazz critics hated commercial Mann LPs like Discotheque and Waterbed with a passion, and saw them as examples of a gifted virtuoso dumbing his music down in order to sell more records. But young soul and funk lovers were digging Mann and didn't understand why jazz snobs had it in for him. ...Waterbed is a vocal-oriented soul/funk project first and foremost. In fact, it's one of the strongest commercial albums he recorded ...worth trying to find if you're a fan of 1970s soul/funk".

== Track listing ==
1. "Waterbed" (Melvin Barton, Walter Chiles) – 3:49
2. "Deus Xango" (Astor Piazzolla) – 4:34
3. "Violet Don't Be Blue" (Pat Kirby, Pat Rebillot) – 5:08
4. "I Got a Woman" (Ray Charles, Renald Richard) – 3:48
5. "Comin' Home Baby" (Ben Tucker, Bob Dorough) – 5:33
6. "Paradise Music" (Herbie Mann) – 4:55
7. "Bang! Bang!" (Joe Cuba, Jimmy Sabater) – 4:50
8. "Body Oil" (Mann) – 4:49

== Personnel ==
- Herbie Mann – flute
- David Newman – tenor saxophone (tracks 1 & 7)
- Pat Rebillot – keyboards
- Jerry Friedman, Bob Mann (tracks 2–4 & 8), Hugh McCracken (tracks 2–4 & 8), Jeff Mironov (tracks 1 & 5–7) – guitar
- Will Lee (tracks 1 & 5–7), Tony Levin (tracks 2–4 & 8) – bass
- Steve Gadd (tracks 1–4 & 6–8), Allan Schwartzberg (track 5), Darryl Washington (track 5) – drums
- Ray Barretto, Armen Halburian, Ralph MacDonald, Ray Mantilla – percussion (tracks 2–4 & 8)
- Anahid Ajemian, Matthew Raimondi – violin (tracks 3–6 & 8)
- Jean Dane – viola (tracks 3–6 & 8)
- Michael Rudiakov – cello (tracks 3–6 & 8)
- The Hijackers: Cissy Houston, Sylvia Shemwell, Eunice Peterson – vocals
