= Blue Greens & Beans =

Studio album by David "Fathead" Newman, Marchel Ivery and The Rein de Graaff Trio
- Released: 1991
- Recorded: May 1, 1990
- Studio: Studio 44, Monster, Holland
- Genre: Jazz
- Length: 54:44
- Label: Timeless; SJP 351
- Producer: Rein de Graaff

David "Fathead" Newman chronology
Blue Head (1989)	Blue Greens & Beans (1991)	Return to the Wide Open Spaces (1990)

Blue Greens & Beans is an album by American saxophonist David "Fathead" Newman recorded in Holland in 1990 and released on the Timeless label.

Professional ratings
Review scores
Source	Rating
AllMusic	3/5 stars

== Track listing ==
1. "Blue Greens and Beans" (Mal Waldron) – 7:43
2. "Montana Banana" (David "Fathead" Newman) – 8:29
3. "I've Grown Accustomed to Her Face" (Frederick Loewe, Alan Jay Lerner) – 5:01
4. "A Night in Tunisia" (Dizzy Gillespie, Frank Paparelli) – 10:43
5. "Good Bait" (Tadd Dameron, Count Basie) – 8:38
6. "Skylark" (Hoagy Carmichael, Johnny Mercer) – 5:44
7. "Wide Open Spaces" (Babs Gonzales) – 8:26

== Personnel ==
- David "Fathead" Newman – tenor saxophone, flute (tracks 1, 2 & 4–7)
- Marchel Ivery – tenor saxophone (tracks 1–5 & 7)
- Rein de Graaff – piano
- Koos Serierse – bass
- Eric Ineke – drums
