= Bird in a Silver Cage =

Studio album by Herbie Mann
- Released: 1976
- Recorded: 1976
- Studio: Union Studios, Munich, West Germany
- Genre: Jazz
- Length: 36:20
- Label: Atlantic Records; SD 18209
- Producer: Michael Kunze, Sylvester Levay

Herbie Mann chronology
Reggae II (1976)	Bird in a Silver Cage (1976)	Gagaku & Beyond (1976)

Bird in a Silver Cage is an album by flautist Herbie Mann recorded in 1976 and released on the Atlantic Records label.

== Reception ==
Professional ratings
Review scores
Source	Rating
AllMusic	2/5 stars

AllMusic site awarded the album 2 stars and its review by Jim Newsome states: "Another example of Herbie Mann's quest for new playing environments leading him to follow another trend, in this case the disco music coming out of Germany in the mid-to-late seventies".

== Track listing ==
1. "Bird in a Silver Cage" (Sylvester Levay) – 12:51
2. "Aria" (Dario Baldan Bembo, Sergio Bardotti) – 4:51
3. "Fly, Robin, Fly" (Levay, Stephan Prager) – 1:06
4. "Birdwalk" (Levay, Herbie Mann) – 7:34
5. "Years of Love" (Levay) – 3:32
6. "The Piper" (Mann) – 6:26

== Personnel ==
- Herbie Mann – flute
- Sylvester Levay – keyboards, arranger, conductor
- Nick Woodland – guitar
- Gary Unwin – bass
- Martin Harrison – drums
- Elmer Louis, Joseph Spector – percussion
- Jerry Rix – backing vocals
- Penny McLean and the Munich Studio Choir – vocals (track 2)
- Unidentified string section directed by Fritz Sonneleitner
