= Chillin' (David "Fathead" Newman album) =

Studio album by David "Fathead" Newman
- Released: October 1, 1999
- Recorded: December 16, 1998
- Studios: Van Gelder, Englewood Cliffs, NJ
- Genre: Jazz
- Length: 48:31
- Labels: HighNote; HCD 7036
- Producers: David "Fathead" Newman, Houston Person

David "Fathead" Newman chronology
Under a Woodstock Moon (1996)	Chillin' (1999)	Keep the Spirits Singing (2001)

Chillin' is an album by American saxophonist David "Fathead" Newman, recorded in 1998 and released on the HighNote label the following year.

== Reception ==
Professional ratings
Review scores
Source	Rating
AllMusic	4.5/5 stars
The Penguin Guide to Jazz Recordings	3/4 stars

In his review on AllMusic, Scott Yanow states, "This straight-ahead effort is pretty definitive of his jazz abilities, for it has Newman making four appearances on tenor, two on soprano, and one apiece on flute and alto. ... Highly recommended". In JazzTimes, Willard Jenkins noted, "Standing in the middle of a mountain stream, barefoot and coverall-ed on the CD cover, all’s seemingly right in Fathead’s world. And that sense of comfort and good vibes permeates this disc, whose title is quite apt. Newman embraces this music with the seasoned improviser’s special coupling of swing and relaxation. There is a level of communication reached when bandleaders have the luxury of long-term work with familiars". On All About Jazz, Douglas Payne said, "This compelling, easily enjoyable set shows the many sides of David Newman's personality – and his distinctive and vital talents on a variety of reed instruments too".

== Track listing ==
1. "Take the Coltrane" (Duke Ellington) – 5:51
2. "Return to Paradise" (Dimitri Tiomkin, Ned Washington) – 5:51
3. "The Whole Tzimmes" (David "Fathead" Newman) – 5:58
4. "These Foolish Things" (Jack Strachey, Holt Marvell, Harry Link) – 9:37
5. "Invitation" (Bronisław Kaper, Paul Francis Webster) – 5:32
6. "Chillin'" (Newman) – 6:34
7. "Caravan" (Juan Tizol, Ellington, Irving Mills) – 4:42
8. "Red Top" (Lionel Hampton, Ben Kynard) – 4:26

== Personnel ==
- David "Fathead" Newman – tenor saxophone, soprano saxophone, alto saxophone, flute
- John Hicks – piano
- Bryan Carrott – vibraphone
- Steve Novosel – bass
- Winard Harper – drums
- Cadino Newman – vocals (tracks 7 & 8)
