= The Sound of the Wide Open Spaces!!!! =

1960 studio album by James Clay and David Newman

Studio album by James Clay and David "Fathead" Newman
- Released: 1960
- Recorded: April 26, 1960; New York City
- Genre: Jazz
- Length: 40:01
- Label: Riverside; RLP 327
- Producer: Julian "Cannonball" Adderley

James Clay chronology
The Sound of the Wide Open Spaces!!!! (1960)	A Double Dose of Soul (1960)

David "Fathead" Newman chronology
Fathead (1960)	The Sound of the Wide Open Spaces!!!! (1960)	Straight Ahead (1961)

The Sound of the Wide Open Spaces!!!! is the debut album by American saxophonist/flautist James Clay and the second album by David "Fathead" Newman, featuring performances recorded in 1960 and released on the Riverside label.

== Reception ==
Professional ratings
Review scores
Source	Rating
All About Jazz	3.5/5 stars
AllMusic	3/5 stars
The Penguin Guide to Jazz Recordings	2.5/4 stars

Scott Yanow of AllMusic said, "Cannonball Adderley supervised the session, putting the spotlight on the competitive horns who really battle it out". On All About Jazz, David Rickert wrote: "Neither Clay's or Newman's work apart from one another is anything to write home about, yet when paired together they managed to create an album that holds its own with the more consistent work of their peers".

== Track listing ==
1. "Wide Open Spaces" (Babs Gonzales) - 12:15
2. "They Can't Take That Away from Me" (George Gershwin, Ira Gershwin) - 6:34
3. "Some Kinda Mean" (Keter Betts) - 6:35
4. "What's New?" (Johnny Burke, Bob Haggart) - 5:46
5. "Figger-Ration" (Gonzales) - 8:51

== Personnel ==
- James Clay – tenor saxophone, flute
- David "Fathead" Newman – tenor saxophone, alto saxophone
- Wynton Kelly – piano
- Sam Jones – bass
- Art Taylor – drums
