= Turtle Bay (album) =

Studio album by Herbie Mann
- Released: 1973
- Recorded: December 20–22, 1971 and March 9, 1973
- Studio: Atlantic, New York City; Regent Sound, New York City
- Genre: Jazz
- Length: 42:19
- Label: Atlantic; SD 1642
- Producer: Arif Mardin, Herbie Mann

Herbie Mann chronology
Hold On, I'm Comin' (1972)	Turtle Bay (1973)	London Underground (1973)

Turtle Bay is an album by flautist Herbie Mann recorded in 1971 and 1973 and released on the Atlantic label.

== Reception ==
Professional ratings
Review scores
Source	Rating
Allmusic	3/5 stars

The Allmusic site awarded the album 3 stars stating: "Herbie Mann goes back to the well of soul on this LP and comes up with another tastefully funky selection of rock/R&B hits mixed with a few originals of his own. ... Herbie's own flute work is often low-key, maybe even a bit lazy, but he is audibly sympathetic with the material".

== Track listing ==
All compositions by Herbie Mann except where noted.

1. "Family Affair" (Sylvester Stewart) – 3:02
2. "Never Ending Song of Love" (Delaney Bramlett) – 5:48
3. "Rainy Night in Georgia" (Tony Joe White) – 3:56
4. "(Just an Old) Balalaika Love Song" – 3:46
5. "Reverend Lee" (Eugene McDaniels) – 3:00
6. "Turtle Bay" – 2:45
7. "In Memory of Elizabeth Reed" (Dickey Betts; arranged by William Eaton) – 3:36
8. "A Theme from "Cries And Whispers"" (Frédéric Chopin) – 3:24
9. "Do It Again" (Walter Becker, Donald Fagen) – 2:59
10. "Now I've Found a Lady (Soul Rachanga)" (arranged by Herbie Mann) – 3:36
11. "Happier Than the Morning Sun" (Stevie Wonder) – 2:59
- Recorded at Atlantic Recording Studios, NYC on December 20, 1971 (track 2), December 21, 1971 (track 3) and December 22, 1971 (tracks 1, 4 & 5) and at Regent Sound Studios, NYC on March 9, 1973 (tracks 6–11)

== Personnel ==
- Herbie Mann – flute, alto flute (track 3)
- Pat Rebillot – piano, electric piano, organ, arrangements
- Jerry Friedman (tracks 6–11), David Spinozza (tracks 1–5) – guitar
- Jerry Jemmott (tracks 1–5) Willie Weeks (tracks 6–11) – bass
- Charles Collins (tracks 6, 8, 10 & 11), Reggie Ferguson (tracks 1–5, 7 & 9) – drums
- Ralph MacDonald - percussion
- Tessie Coen – congas (tracks 6 & 7)
- Gene Orloff, Gerald Tarack – violin (tracks 8, 10 & 11)
- Selwart Clarke – viola (tracks 8, 10 & 11)
- Kermit Moore – cello (tracks 8, 10 & 11)
- Gene Bianco (tracks 1–5), Corky Hale (track 8) – harp

Technical

- Jimmy Douglass – engineer
- Don Brautigam – cover illustration
- Joel Brodsky – photography
- Paula Bisacca – art direction, design
