= Mr. Gentle Mr. Cool =

Studio album by David "Fathead" Newman
- Released: 1994
- Recorded: June 27–30, 1994
- Studio: Sony Music Studios, New York, NY
- Genre: Jazz
- Length: 55:56
- Label: Kokopelli; KOKO 1300
- Producer: Herbie Mann

David "Fathead" Newman chronology
Bluesiana II (1994)	Mr. Gentle Mr. Cool (1994)	Under a Woodstock Moon (1996)

Mr. Gentle Mr. Cool, subtitled A Tribute to Duke Ellington, is an album by American saxophonist David "Fathead" Newman recorded in 1994 and released on Herbie Mann's Kokopelli label.

== Reception ==
Professional ratings
Review scores
Source	Rating
AllMusic	4.5/5 stars

In his review for AllMusic, Scott Yanow states "David "Fathead" Newman is in excellent form on this tasteful program of 11 Duke Ellington compositions. ... The music contains few real surprises (other than the utilization of both bass and piccolo bass) but swings nicely and has fine melodic solos".

== Track listing ==
All compositions by Duke Ellington except where noted

1. "Don't Get Around Much Anymore" (Ellington, Bob Russell) – 4:41
2. "Prelude to a Kiss" (Ellington, Irving Gordon, Irving Mills) – 5:39
3. "Mr. Gentle and Mr. Cool" (Ellington, Harold Baker) – 5:45
4. "Almost Cried" – 6:21
5. "I Let a Song Go Out of My Heart" (Ellington, Mills, Henry Nemo, John Redmond) – 5:12
6. "Azure" (Ellington, Mills) – 5:39
7. "What Am I Here For?" (Ellington, Frankie Laine) – 4:46
8. "Happy Reunion" – 3:42
9. "Come Sunday" – 2:56
10. "Creole Love Call" – 5:43
11. "Jeep's Blues" (Ellington, Johnny Hodges) – 5:32

== Personnel ==
- David "Fathead" Newman – tenor saxophone, alto saxophone, flute
- Jim Pugh – trombone
- David Leonhardt – piano
- Ron Carter – piccolo bass
- Peter Washington – bass
- Lewis Nash – drums
- Bob Freedman – arranger
