= Reggae (album) =

Studio album by Herbie Mann
- Released: 1973
- Recorded: 1973
- Studio: Advision, London
- Genre: Jazz
- Length: 38:44
- Label: Atlantic; SD 1655
- Producer: Geoffrey Haslam

Herbie Mann chronology
London Underground (1973)	Reggae (1973)	First Light (1973)

Reggae is an album by flautist Herbie Mann with the Tommy McCook Band recorded in London in 1973 and released on the Atlantic label.

== Reception ==
Professional ratings
Review scores
Source	Rating
Allmusic	3/5 stars
The Penguin Guide to Jazz Recordings	2/4 stars

The Allmusic site awarded the album 3 stars stating: "Despite its title, most of the music on this album is not actually reggae but a mixture of jazz, R&B and pop. Flutist Herbie Mann, guitarists Mick Taylor and Albert Lee and keyboardist Pat Rebillot combine with the eight-piece Tommy McCook band to create some spirited and danceable (if a bit dated) music... The results are fun if not all that substantial". The Penguin Guide to Jazz Recordings gave the album 2 stars saying it had: "No more than a hint of reggae".

== Track listing ==
1. "Ob-La-Di, Ob-La-Da" (John Lennon, Paul McCartney) - 7:44
2. "Rivers of Babylon" (Brenton Dowe, Trevor McNaughton) - 4:42
3. "Swinging Shepherd Blues" (Kenny Jacobson, Moe Koffman, Rhoda Roberts) - 8:19
4. "My Girl" (Smokey Robinson, Ronald White) - 17:59

== Personnel ==
- Herbie Mann - flute
- Bobby Ellis - trumpet
- Tommy McCook - tenor saxophone
- Gladstone Anderson - piano
- Winston Wright - organ
- Pat Rebillot - piano, clavinet
- Hux Brown, Rod Bryan, Albert Lee, Mick Taylor - guitar
- Jackie Jackson - bass
- Michael Richard - drums

Technical

- Gary Martin - engineer
- Ahmet Ertegun - executive producer
- Don Brautigam - cover illustration
