= David "Fathead" Newman =

American jazz and R&B saxophonist (1933–2009)

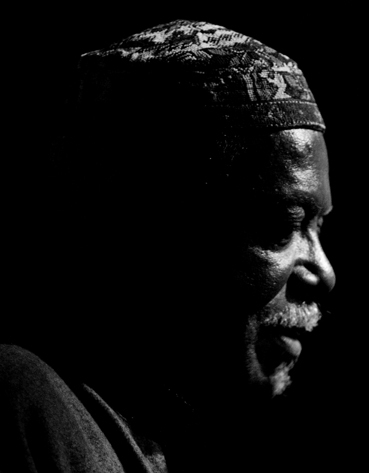
- Newman in 2007

Background information
- Born: February 24, 1933; Corsicana, Texas, U.S.
- Died: January 20, 2009 (aged 75) Kingston, New York, U.S.
- Genres: Soul jazz; hard bop; mainstream jazz
- Occupations: Musician; composer
- Instruments: Saxophone; flute
- Labels: Atlantic; Prestige; Riverside
- Website: davidfatheadnewman.com

David "Fathead" Newman (February 24, 1933 – January 20, 2009) was an American jazz and rhythm-and-blues saxophonist, who made numerous recordings as a session musician and leader, but is best known for his work as a sideman on seminal 1950s and early 1960s recordings by Ray Charles.

The AllMusic Guide to Jazz wrote that "there have not been many saxophonists and flutists more naturally soulful than David 'Fathead' Newman." Newman was a leading proponent of the "Texas Tenor" saxophone style, a big-toned, bluesy approach popularized by jazz tenor players from that state.

== Early life ==
Newman was born in Corsicana, Texas, United States, on February 24, 1933, but grew up in Dallas, where he studied first the piano and then the saxophone. According to one account, he got his nickname "Fathead" in school when "an outraged music instructor used it as an epithet after catching Newman playing a Sousa march from memory rather than from reading the sheet music, which rested upside down on the stand."

Inspired by the jump blues bandleader Louis Jordan, Newman took up the alto saxophone in the seventh grade, and was mentored by former Count Basie saxophonist Buster Smith. Newman went on to Jarvis Christian College on a music and theology scholarship but quit school after three years and began playing professionally.

== Career ==
Newman began his career playing mostly jazz and blues with a number of musicians that included Buster Smith, pianist Lloyd Glenn, and guitarist bandleaders Lowell Fulson and T-Bone Walker.

=== Sideman and soloist with Ray Charles ===
Newman met and befriended Ray Charles in early 1951 when Charles was playing piano and singing with the Lowell Fulson band. Newman joined Charles's band in 1954 as a baritone saxophone player, but later switched to tenor and became the principal saxophone soloist after tenor saxophonist Don Wilkerson left the band.

Many of Charles's seminal recordings during the 1950s and early 1960s feature a saxophone solo by Newman. These include hits such as "Lonely Avenue", "Swanee River Rock", "Ain't That Love", "The Right Time" (with Newman on alto sax), and "Unchain My Heart". Although his solos were short in duration, they became, as The New York Times later noted, "crucial to the Ray Charles sound". Atlantic Records' producer Jerry Wexler, who worked with Charles, called Newman Charles's "alter ego on tenor". Charles said that Newman "could make his sax sing the song like no one else". As Newman himself put it: "I became famous for playing 8-bar and 12-bar solos!"

In 1960, Newman released his debut album as a leader, Fathead: Ray Charles Presents David Newman, with Charles playing piano. He stayed with the Ray Charles band until 1964, and rejoined the group in 1970–1971.

=== Later work ===
After leaving Charles's band, Newman worked with Herbie Mann's band in 1970–71, and recorded albums for Atlantic, Warner Bros., Prestige and Muse. Newman did session work with a variety of artists, including Aretha Franklin, B. B. King, Joe Cocker, Gregg Allman, Dr. John, and Natalie Cole on her Unforgettable album. In 1978 he released a single called "Keep the Dream Alive" from the album of the same name. The track, which promotes his use of flute together with a disco beat, made it into the Billboard and Disco Charts. He also worked as a sideman with Jimmy Scott, B. B. King, and Lou Rawls. He scored films and performed in the Robert Altman film Kansas City, and did a national tour with the band from that 1996 film for Verve records. In 1990 he was nominated for a Grammy Award for recordings with Art Blakey and Dr. John as 'Bluesiana Triangle'.

Over the years up to 2008, Newman recorded more than 38 albums under his own name, including his first, Fathead: Ray Charles Presents David 'Fathead' Newman, recorded in 1958, but not released until 1960, and the second, The Sound of the Wide Open Spaces!!!!, with James Clay, produced by Cannonball Adderley.

Newman also played R&B and blues, appearing on recordings with Jimmy Scott, Stanley Turrentine, Aretha Franklin, B. B. King, the Average White Band, Jimmy McGriff, Eric Clapton, John Stein, Natalie Cole, Hank Crawford, Aaron Neville, Queen Latifah, Richard Tee, Dr. John, Cheryl Bentyne of The Manhattan Transfer, and country-rock/tex-mex artist Doug Sahm. The late Roy Hargrove, trumpeter, band leader and composer (1969–2018) credits hearing Newman play while Hargrove was still a high school student and being enthralled by his jazz improvisation. Newman performed with Hargrove and recorded several tunes on Hargrove's 1995 album, Family.

== Death ==
Newman died in Kingston, New York, on January 20, 2009, at the age of 75, of pancreatic cancer.

== Fictional portrayal ==
Newman was portrayed by Bokeem Woodbine in the 2004 Ray Charles biopic Ray. While praising Jamie Foxx's performance as Ray Charles, Newman disputed the accuracy of the film's depiction of himself, in particular its portrayal of him as having introduced Charles to heroin.

== Discography ==
=== As leader/co-leader ===
- Fathead: Ray Charles Presents David 'Fathead' Newman (Atlantic, recorded 1958)
- The Sound of the Wide Open Spaces!!!!, with James Clay (Riverside, 1960)
- Straight Ahead (Atlantic, 1961)
- Fathead Comes On (Atlantic, 1962)
- House of David (Atlantic, 1967)
- Double Barrelled Soul (Atlantic, 1968) with Jack McDuff
- Bigger & Better (Atlantic, 1968)
- The Many Facets of David Newman (Atlantic, 1968)
- Captain Buckles (Cotillion, 1971)
- Lonely Avenue (Atlantic, 1972)
- The Weapon (Atlantic, 1973)
- Newmanism (Atlantic, 1974)
- Mr. Fathead (Warner Bros., 1976)
- Front Money (Warner Bros., 1977)
- Concrete Jungle (Prestige, 1978)
- Keep the Dream Alive (Prestige, 1978)
- Scratch My Back (Prestige, 1979)
- Resurgence! (Muse, 1981)
- Still Hard Times (Muse, 1982)
- Heads Up (Atlantic, 1987)
- Fire! Live at the Village Vanguard (Atlantic, 1989) with Hank Crawford, Stanley Turrentine
- Blue Head (Candid, 1989) with Clifford Jordan
- Blue Greens & Beans (Timeless, 1990) with Marchel Ivery & the Rein de Graaff Trio
- Return to the Wide Open Spaces (Amazing, 1990) with Ellis Marsalis Jr. and Cornell Dupree
- Bluesiana Triangle (Windham Hill, 1990) with Bluesiana Triangle
- Bluesiana II (Windham Hill, 1991) with Bluesiana Triangle
- Mr. Gentle Mr. Cool (Kokopelli, 1994)
- Under a Woodstock Moon (Kokopelli, 1996)
- Chillin' (HighNote, 1999)
- Keep the Spirits Singing (HighNote, 2001)
- Davey Blue (HighNote, 2001)
- The Gift (HighNote, 2003)
- Song for the New Man (HighNote, 2004)
- I Remember Brother Ray (HighNote, 2005)
- Cityscape (HighNote, 2006)
- Life (HighNote, 2007)
- Diamondhead (HighNote, 2008)
- The Blessing (HighNote, 2009)

=== As sideman ===
With Laverne Butler

- A Foolish Thing to Do (Maxjazz, 2000)

With Ray Charles

- The Great Ray Charles (Atlantic, 1957)
- Yes Indeed! (Atlantic, 1958)
- Ray Charles at Newport (Atlantic, 1958)
- What'd I Say (Atlantic, 1959)
- The Genius of Ray Charles (Atlantic, 1959)
- Ray Charles in Person (Atlantic, 1960)
- The Genius Hits the Road (ABC-Paramount, 1960)
- The Genius After Hours (Atlantic, 1961)
- Sweet & Sour Tears (ABC-Paramount, 1964)
- Jazz at the Philharmonic: Ray Charles - Berlin 1962 (Pablo, 1996)

With Hank Crawford

- The Soul Clinic (Atlantic, 1962)
- From the Heart (Atlantic, 1962)
- Double Cross (Atlantic, 1968)
- Mr. Blues Plays Lady Soul (Atlantic, 1969)
- Night Beat (Milestone, 1989)
- Tight (Milestone, 1996)

With Cornell Dupree

- Teasin' (Atlantic, 1974)

With Eddie Harris

- The Electrifying Eddie Harris (Atlantic, 1967)

With Randy Johnston

- Detour Ahead (HighNote, 1998 [2001])

With JW-Jones

- Kissing in 29 Days (NorthernBlues, 2006)

With B. B. King

- There Must Be a Better World Somewhere (MCA, 1981)
- Let the Good Times Roll (MCA, 1999)

With Charles Kynard

- The Soul Brotherhood (Prestige, 1969)

With Junior Mance

- I Believe to My Soul (Atlantic, 1968)
- Live at the Top (Atlantic, 1968)
- Truckin' and Trakin' (Bee Hive, 1983)

With Herbie Mann

- The Inspiration I Feel (Atlantic, 1968)
- Mississippi Gambler (Atlantic, 1972)
- Hold On, I'm Comin' (Atlantic, 1973)
- First Light (Atlantic, 1974)
- Waterbed (Atlantic, 1975)
- Surprises (Atlantic, 1976)
- Reggae II (Atlantic, 1976)

With Arif Mardin

- Journey (Atlantic, 1974)

With Jimmy McGriff

- The Starting Five (Milestone, 1987)
- The Dream Team (Milestone, 1997)
- Straight Up (Milestone, 1998)
- Feelin' It (Milestone, 2001)

With Meeco

- Amargo Mel (Connector, 2009)

With Jane Monheit

- Never Never Land (N-Coded, 2000)

With Buddy Montgomery

- Ties of Love (Landmark, 1987)
- So Why Not? (Landmark, 1988)

With Lee Morgan

- Sonic Boom (Blue Note, 1967)

With Don Patterson

- Mellow Soul (Prestige, 1967)

With Jimmy Scott

- All the Way (Sire, 1992)

With Shirley Scott

- Shirley Scott & the Soul Saxes (Atlantic, 1969)

With Lonnie Smith

- Think! (Blue Note, 1968)
- Boogaloo to Beck: A Tribute (Scufflin' Records, 2003)

With John Stein

- Green Street (Challenge, 1999)

Other appearances

- The Atlantic Family Live at Montreux (Atlantic, 1977)
