= William S. Fischer =

American jazz musician (1935–2023)

William S. Fischer (March 5, 1935 – May 22, 2023) was an American keyboardist, saxophonist, arranger and composer. He created various musical compositions.

== Life and career ==
Fischer was born in Shelby, Mississippi on March 6, 1935. He worked early in his career with blues and R&B musicians, playing in the 1950s with Ray Charles, Guitar Slim, Big Joe Turner, and Muddy Waters. During this period, he received his bachelor's degree from Xavier University in 1956 before taking a master's degree from Colorado College in 1962. After briefly returning to Xavier as an instructor, he continued his education with non-degree coursework (including experimentation with early synthesizers) at the Vienna Academy of Music and Performance in 1965–66. From 1967 to 1975, he taught in New York public schools.

He worked extensively as an arranger and session musician for jazz and popular music recordings, working with Les McCann and Joe Zawinul (having first met the pianist-composer during his European sojourn); in 1968, Zawinul released The Rise and Fall of the Third Stream, an album primarily consisting of Fischer compositions. He also arranged for Herbie Mann, who signed him to the Embryo Records division of Atlantic. It was for that label that Fischer recorded his 1970 album Circles. Comprising his band were guitarists Hugh McCracken and Eric Weissberg, Ron Carter on electric bass, Billy Cobham on drums/percussion, and Bill Robinson on vocals. Fischer also composed and directed the keyboard elements for the Moog, which were realized at Walter Sear Electronic Music Studio in New York.

Throughout the 1970s, he was associated with Yusef Lateef, Roberta Flack, Gene Ammons, and Junior Mance among others. In 1972, Fischer issued two solo albums. On his private Arcana label was Omen, a group of multitracked, manually played synth takes at Walter Sear. On the Spanish label Herri Gogoa, Fischer released Akelarre Sorta, a collection of psych-soul treatments of Basque folk idioms.

He recorded with Roland Kirk in 1977 and with Pharoah Sanders in 1982. Fischer died on May 22, 2023, at the age of 88.
