= Ruth Brown (album) =

Studio album by Ruth Brown
- Released: 1957
- Recorded: May 25, 1949, February 28 and September, 1950, February 13, July 2 and December 19, 1952, April 10 and December 16, 1953, May 7 and August 11, 1954, March 1 and July 7, 1955 and September 25, 1956; NYC
- Genre: Rhythm and blues
- Label: Atlantic; 8004

Ruth Brown chronology
Ruth Brown (1957)	Miss Rhythm (1959)

Ruth Brown (subtitled Rock & Roll) is the debut album by vocalist Ruth Brown featuring tracks recorded between 1949 and 1956 and released on the Atlantic label.

== Reception ==
Professional ratings
Review scores
Source	Rating
AllMusic	3/5 stars

AllMusic awarded the album 3 stars stating "Ruth Brown at her stinging, assertive, bawdy best, doing the sizzling, innuendo-laden R&B that helped make Atlantic the nation's prime independent during the early days of rock & roll".

== Track listing ==
1. "Lucky Lips" (Jerry Leiber, Mike Stoller) – 2:04
2. "As Long as I'm Moving" (Charles E. Cahoun) – 2:41
3. "Wild Wild Young Men" (A. Nugetre) – 2:30
4. "Daddy Daddy" (Rudolph Toombs) – 2:53
5. "Mambo Baby" (Rose Marie McCoy, Charles Singleton) – 2:41
6. "Teardrops from My Eyes" (Toombs) – 2:54
7. "Hello Little Boy" (Ruth Brown) – 2:38
8. "(Mama) He Treats Your Daughter Mean" (Johnny Wallace, Herb Lance) – 2:51
9. "5-10-15 Hours" (Toombs) – 3:11
10. "It's Love Baby" (Ted Jarrett) – 2:40
11. "Sentimental Journey" (Les Brown, Ben Homer, Bud Green) – 2:34
12. "Old Man River" (Jerome Kern, Oscar Hammerstein II) – 2:12
13. "So Long" (Remus Harris, Russ Morgan, Irving Melsher) – 2:36
14. "Oh What a Dream" (Chuck Willis) – 2:51

== Personnel ==
- Ruth Brown – vocal with various personnel including:
- Dick Cary – alto horn
- Bobby Hackett, Taft Jordan, Ed "Tiger" Lewis – trumpet
- Will Bradley, Richard Harris – trombone
- Peanuts Hucko – clarinet, tenor saxophone
- Arnett Cobb, Willis Jackson, Sam Taylor – tenor saxophone
- Ernie Caceres, Haywood Henry, Sylvester Thomas, Paul Williams – baritone saxophone
- Joe Bushkin, Ernie Hayes, John Lewis, Bu Pleasant, Harry Van Walls – piano
- Rector Bailey, Mickey Baker, John Collins, Eddie Condon – guitar
- George Duvivier, Jack Lesberg, Benny Moten, Lloyd Trotman – bass
- Sidney Catlett, Connie Kay, Joe Marshall, Noruddin Zafer – drums
- The Delta Rhythm Boys, The Rhythmakers – backing vocals

== See also ==
- List of 1957 albums
- Atlantic Records' 8000 Series:
  - LaVern Baker (album)
  - Ray Charles (album)
