= Have a Good Time (Ruth Brown album) =

Live album by Ruth Brown
- Released: 1988
- Venue: Cinegrill
- Genre: R&B
- Producer: Ralph Jungheim

Ruth Brown chronology
Sweet Baby of Mine (1987)	Have a Good Time (1988)	Blues on Broadway (1989)

Have a Good Time is a live album by the American R&B singer Ruth Brown, released in 1988. Her first album for Fantasy Records, it was a factor in Brown's late 1980s career resurgence.

== Production ==
Produced by Ralph Jungheim, the album was recorded at the Hollywood Roosevelt Hotel's Cinegrill. Charles Williams, Red Holloway, and Bobby Forrester were members of Ruth's backing band. "5-10-15 Hours", "Have a Good Time", "Teardrops from My Eyes", and "(Mama) He Treats Your Daughter Mean" are remakes of four of Brown's Atlantic hits.

== Critical reception ==
Professional ratings
Review scores
Source	Rating
AllMusic	4/5 stars
The Grove Press Guide to the Blues on CD	4/5 stars
MusicHound R&B: The Essential Album Guide	3/5 stars
The Rolling Stone Album Guide	3/5 stars

The St. Petersburg Times thought that "the sheer giddiness that drove '5-10-15 Hours' or '(Mama) He Treats Your Daughter Mean' in the originals (almost 40 years old!) has been replaced by someone who knows everything worth knowing about phrasing, rhythm and life its ownself." The Philadelphia Inquirer called Have a Good Time "a great album: history without the history books," writing that Brown "tailors mighty vocal wails to the intimate environment of a jazz session, all the while playing off the charged, fiercely rhythmic accompaniment of organist Bobby Forrester."

AllMusic wrote that "Brown is assisted by a fine quintet ... for fresh remakes of some of her hits, along with some newer material."

== Track listing ==
No.	Title	Length
1.	"Gee Baby, Ain't I Good to You"
2.	"You Won't Let Me Go"
3.	"5-10-15 Hours"
4.	"Have a Good Time"
5.	"Teardrops from My Eyes"
6.	"Always on My Mind"
7.	"Yes Sir, That's My Baby"
8.	"When I Fall in Love"
9.	"(Mama) He Treats Your Daughter Mean"
10.	"What a Wonderful World"

== Personnel ==
- Ruth Brown – vocals
- Charles Williams – alto sax
- Red Holloway – tenor sax
- Bobby Forrester – organ
- Bill Williams – guitar
- Clarence Bean – drums
- Ralph Jungheim – producer
- John Eargle – engineer
