= Miss Rhythm =

Studio album by Ruth Brown
- Released: 1959
- Recorded: May 7, 1954, March 1, 1955, September 25, 1956, April 15 and December 5, 1957, July 30, 1958 and March 7, 1959; NYC
- Genre: Rhythm and blues
- Length: 36:03
- Labels: Atlantic; 8026

Ruth Brown chronology
Ruth Brown (1957)	Miss Rhythm (1959)	Late Date with Ruth Brown (1959)

Miss Rhythm is an album by vocalist Ruth Brown featuring tracks recorded between 1954 and 1959 and released on the Atlantic label.

== Reception ==
Professional ratings
Review scores
Source	Rating
AllMusic	3.5/5 stars

AllMusic awarded the album 3½ stars stating "Ruth Brown's second LP is a minor masterpiece".

== Track listing ==
1. "This Little Girl's Gone Rockin'" (Manny Curtis, Bobby Darin) – 1:51
2. "Just Too Much" (Jerry Wexler, C. Taylor) – 2:30
3. "I Hope We Meet (On the Road Someday)" (Rudy Toombs) – 2:44
4. "Why Me" (Brook Benton, Belford Hendricks, Ronald Mack) – 2:25
5. "Somebody Touched Me" (Ahmet Ertegun) – 2:27
6. "When I Get You Baby" (Jimmy Lewis, Ruth Brown) – 2:08
7. "Jack O' Diamonds" (Jerry Leiber, Mike Stoller) – 2:33
8. "I Can't Hear a Word You Say" (Leiber, Stoller) – 2:30
9. "One More Time" (Rose Marie McCoy, Charlie Singleton) – 2:41
10. "Book of Lies" (C. Small, D. Moore) – 2:33
11. "I Can See Everybody's Baby" (Leroy Kirkland, Mamie Thomas) – 3:02
12. "Show Me" (Joe Shapiro, Lou Stallman) – 2:37

== Personnel ==
- Ruth Brown – vocal with various personnel including
- Ed "Tiger" Lewis, Steve Lipkins, Joe Wilder – trumpet
- Jimmy Cleveland, Richard Harris – trombone
- Jimmy Mitchell, Jerome Richardson – alto saxophone
- Arnett Cobb, King Curtis, Budd Johnson, Sam Taylor – tenor saxophone
- Sylvester Thomas – baritone saxophone
- Lee Anderson, Dick Hyman, Bu Pleasant, Mike Stoller – piano
- Mickey Baker, Al Caiola, Allen Hanlon, Mundell Lowe, Charles Macey – guitar
- Abie Baker, Percy Heath, Benny Moten, Lloyd Trotman – bass
- Connie Kay, Joe Marshall, Noruddin Zafer – drums
- Jerry Duane, Bob Harter, Artie Malvin, Bill Marine, Robert Miller, Ralph Nyland, The Rhythmakers, Maeretha Stewart – backing vocals
