= Be Anything (but Be Mine) =

"Be Anything (But Be Mine)"

Single by Connie Francis
- A-side: "Be Anything (but Be Mine)"
- B-side: "Tommy"
- Released: 1964
- Recorded: 1964
- Genre: Traditional pop
- Length: 2:09
- Label: MGM Records
- Songwriter: Irving Gordon
- Producer: Danny Davis

Connie Francis US singles chronology
"Blue Winter" (1964)	"Be Anything (But Be Mine)" (1964)	"Looking For Love" (1964)

"Be Anything (but Be Mine)" is a popular song composed by Irving Gordon, which was published in 1952.

== Recorded versions ==
- The most successful version of the song was that by Eddy Howard was released as Mercury 5815, which reached number 13 in the spring of 1952.The song marked the debut release of Peggy Lee on Decca Records, being recorded on April 3, 1952 and issued on Decca (catalog number 8142). This version reached number 21.
- A version by Champ Butler (Columbia 39690) reached No. 26.
- A version by Helen O'Connell (Capitol 2011) (number 30)
- Mercury Records also cut a version for the R&B market with Wini Brown & her Boyfriends; released as Mercury 8270, the track reportedly featured the Ravens as the male chorale.
- Ruth Brown also recorded "Be Anything (but be Mine)" (Atlantic 2015) but her version was relegated to the B-side of the track "5-10-15 Hours".
- Gloria Lynne recorded "Be Anything (but Be Mine)" early in 1964 as her debut release on Mercury Records' Fontana label (Fontana 1890). The track entered the Hot 100 in April 1964, but rose no higher than number 88, its hit potential stymied by a lawsuit which barred the sales of any Fontana releases by Lynne, the singer's prior label Everest Records contending to still have Lynne contractually obligated. Fontana was prevented from releasing product by Lynne until February 1965, when her version of "Be Anything (but Be Mine)" made its album debut on her album Intimate Moments.
- Betty Everett recorded a version of 'Be Anything (But Be Mine)' on her cult 1974 album Love Rhymes. The track was produced by Johnny Guitar Watson and David Axelrod.

=== Connie Francis version ===
- "Be Anything (but Be Mine)" did again become a major hit in 1964 via a remake by Connie Francis recorded in an April 8, 1964 session in New York City produced by Danny Davis with Alan Lorber as arranger/conductor. With "Be Anything (but Be Mine)", Francis returned to the mode of remaking traditional pop songs which had provided her with most of her early Top Ten hits, although in the 1960s she had abandoned that formula, with the exception of "Together", a number 8 hit in 1961. "Be Anything (but Be Mine)" did not return Francis to the Top Ten, but did maintain her recent profile as a moderate chart presence with a number 25 peak on Billboard Hot 100, where it would mark Francis' final appearance in the Top 40.^{1} On the Easy Listening chart, which is now the Adult Contemporary chart, it peaked at number 9. In Australia, Francis' "Be Anything (but Be Mine)" charted at number 48."Be Anything (But Be Mine)" peaked at number 24 on the Cash Box Pop 100 where Francis would subsequently reach the Top 40 with "Looking For Love" (number 34; number 29 CAN) "Don't Ever Leave Me" (number 37), "For Mamma (La Mamma)" (number 35; number 38 CAN) and "Jealous Heart" (number 29; number 16 CAN). In Canada "Be Anything (But Be Mine)" reached number 42.

== Other recordings ==
The song has also been recorded by:

- Petula Clark
- Doris Day
- Queen Latifah
- Vera Lynn
- Lou Rawls
- (cs) (as "Buď Můj")
- Jerry Vale
- Sarah Vaughan
- Timi Yuro
