= I Don't Know (Ruth Brown song) =

Single by Ruth Brown
- B-side: "Papa Daddy"
- Released: September 1959
- Recorded: March 7, 1959
- Length: 2:49
- Label: Atlantic 45-2035
- Songwriter(s): Brook Benton; Bobby Stevenson

Ruth Brown singles chronology
"5-10-15 Hours" (1958)	"I Don't Know" (1959)	"Jack O'Diamonds" (1959)

"I Don't Know" is a blues song written by Brook Benton and Bobby Stevenson, and first recorded by Ruth Brown in 1959.

Ruth Brown's recording, made in New York City on March 7, 1959, and issued on Atlantic 45–2035, reached number 5 on the Billboard R&B chart in late 1959, and number 64 on the pop chart. It was Brown's penultimate chart hit. The musicians on the session were Jimmy Cleveland (trombone); King Curtis, Budd Johnson (tenor saxes); Mike Stoller (piano); Al Caiola (guitar); Abie Baker (bass); and Joe Marshall (drums).

Other recordings of the song have been issued by Lorne Lesley (1959), Little Milton (1970), Janiva Magness (2001), Lucy Woodward (2016), and Holly Golightly (2018), among others.
