= Mickey Baker =

American musician (1925–2012)

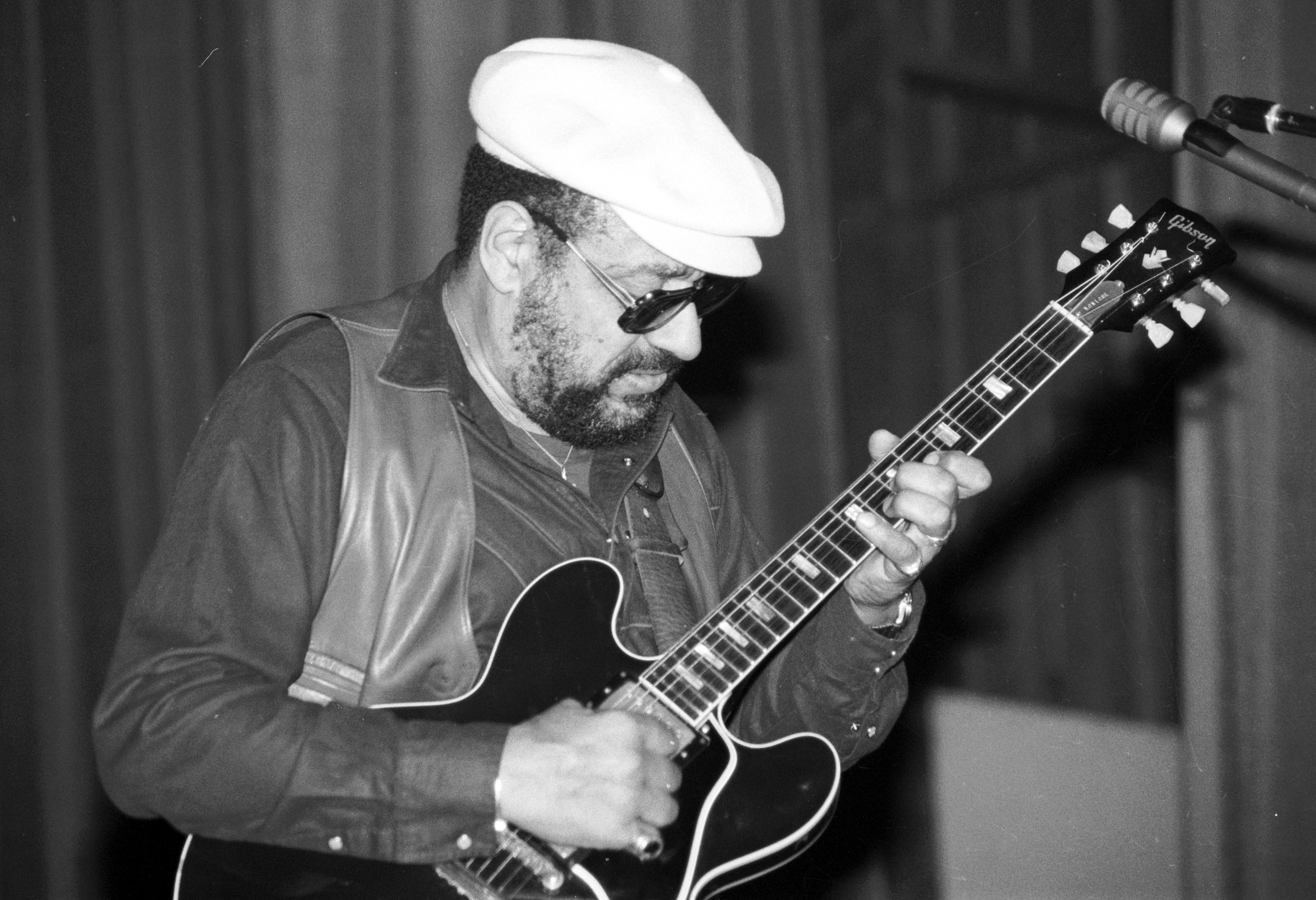
- Baker in concert, 1982

Background information
- Born: McHouston Baker; October 15, 1925; Louisville, Kentucky, U.S.
- Died: November 27, 2012 (aged 87) near Toulouse, France
- Genres: R&B, jazz, rock
- Occupation: Musician
- Instrument: Guitar
- Years active: 1950s–1980s
- Labels: Savoy, Cat, Rainbow, MGM, Atlantic, King

McHouston "Mickey" Baker (October 15, 1925 – November 27, 2012) was an American musician, best known for his work as a studio musician and as part of the recording duo Mickey & Sylvia.

== Early life ==
Baker was born in Louisville, Kentucky. His mother was black, and his father, whom he never met, was believed to be white.

In 1936, at the age of 11, Baker was put into an orphanage. He ran away frequently, and had to be retrieved by the staff from St. Louis, New York City, Chicago, and Pittsburgh. Eventually the orphanage quit looking for him, and at the age of 16, he stayed in New York City. He found work as a laborer and then a dishwasher, but after hanging out in the pool halls of 26th Street, he gave up regular work to become a full-time pool shark.

By 19, Baker, once again, decided to make a change in his life and went back to dishwashing, but remained determined to become a jazz musician. The trumpet was his first choice for an instrument, but with only $14 saved up, he could not find a pawnshop with anything but guitars for that price.

He enrolled at The New York School of Music, but found the learning pace too slow, so he dropped out and resolved to teach himself instead only to give up shortly afterwards. Six months later, he met a street guitarist who inspired him to start playing again and he resumed taking private lessons from different teachers over the next few years. His musical style was influenced by saxophonist Charlie Parker.

== Career ==
By 1949, Baker had his own combo, and a few paying jobs. He decided to move west, but found that audiences there were not receptive to progressive jazz music. Baker was stranded without work in California when he saw a show by blues guitarist Pee Wee Crayton. Baker said of the encounter:

"I asked Pee Wee, 'You mean you can make money playing that stuff on guitar?' Here he was driving a big white Eldorado and had a huge bus for his band. So I started bending strings. I was starving to death, and the blues was just a financial thing for me then."

He found a few jobs in Richmond, California, and made enough money to return to New York.

After returning east, Baker began recording for Savoy, King and Atlantic Records. He did sessions with Doc Pomus, The Drifters, Ray Charles, Ivory Joe Hunter, Ruth Brown, Big Joe Turner, Louis Jordan, Coleman Hawkins, Dion and numerous other artists.

Inspired by the success of Les Paul & Mary Ford, he formed the pop duo Mickey & Sylvia (with Sylvia Robinson, one of his guitar students) in the mid-1950s. Together, they had a hit single with "Love Is Strange" in 1956. After the duo split up in the late 1958, Baker recorded with Kitty Noble as Mickey & Kitty. They released three records on Atlantic Records in 1959. In late 1959, Baker released his debut solo album, The Wildest Guitar, on Atlantic. Mickey & Sylvia reunited in 1960 and sporadically worked together on additional tracks until the mid-1960s.

Around this time he moved to France, where he worked with Ronnie Bird and Chantal Goya and made a few solo records. He would remain in France for the rest of his life. Up until the end of his life, Baker was rarely without work. As well as his influential series of guitar tutor books, he recorded two albums during the 1970s with British label Big Bear Records, one, Take A look Inside, as the featured artist and another as sideman to trombonist Gene Conners.

Baker appeared at the 1975 version of the Roskilde Festival.

== Personal life ==
Baker guarded his personal life as much as possible, giving few interviews and making only sporadic public appearances. After moving to France, he rarely left the country, and made very few trips to the United States.

Baker was married six times. Among his wives were Barbara Castellano from the mid-1950s to the mid-1970s, and Marie France-Drei, a singer with whom he stayed from the early 1980s until his death.

Baker had two children; a son, McHouston Jr., and a daughter, Bonita Lee.

== Death ==
Baker died on November 27, 2012, near Toulouse, France, aged 87. His wife, Marie, said he died of heart and kidney failure.

== Books ==
Baker's self-tuition method book series, the Complete Course in Jazz Guitar is a mainstay for introducing students of guitar to the world of jazz. They have remained in print for over 50 years.

== Awards and honors ==
In 1999, Baker received the Pioneer Award from the Rhythm and Blues Foundation.

In 2003, Baker was listed at No. 53 on Rolling Stone's "100 Greatest Guitarists of All Time".

In 2004, "Love Is Strange" was inducted into the Grammy Hall of Fame.

== Discography ==
=== As leader ===
- The Wildest Guitar (Atlantic, 1959)
- Bossa Nova en Direct du Bresil (Versailles, 1962)
- Mickey Baker Plays Mickey Baker (Versailles, 1962)
- But Wild (King, 1963)
- Bluesingly Yours with Memphis Slim (Polydor, 1968)
- Mickey Baker in Blunderland (Major Minor, 1970)
- The Blues and Me (Black & Blue, 1974)
- Take a Look Inside (Big Bear, 1975)
- Tales from the Underdog (Artist, 1975)
- Mississippi Delta Dues (Blue Star, 1975)
- Up On the Hill (Roots, 1975)
- Blues and Jazz Guitar (Kicking Mule, 1977)
- Jazz Rock Guitar (Kicking Mule, 1978)
- Sweet Harmony (Bellaphon, 1980)
- Back to the Blues (Blue Silver, 1981)
- The Legendary Mickey Baker (Shanachie, 1991)
- New Sounds (Legacy, 2015)

=== As sideman ===
With Dion DiMucci

- Runaround Sue (Laurie Records, 1961)

With Colette Magny

- Melocoton (CBS, 1963)
- Frappe Ton Coeur (Le Chant du Monde, 1963)
- Colette Magny (Le Chant du Monde, 1967)

With others

- Big Maybelle, The Okeh Sessions (Charly, 1983)
- Ronnie Bird, L'amour Nous Rend Fou (Decca, 1964)
- Clarence "Gatemouth" Brown, The Blues Ain't Nothing (Black & Blue, 1972)
- Nappy Brown, Don't Be Angry! (Savoy, 1984)
- Ruth Brown, Ruth Brown (Atlantic, 1957)
- Ruth Brown, Miss Rhythm (Atlantic, 1959)
- Solomon Burke, Solomon Burke (Apollo, 1962)
- Milt Buckner, Rockin' Hammond (Capitol, 1956)
- Eric Charden, Eric Charden (Vega, 1963)
- Gene "The Might Flea" Connors, Let The Good Times Roll (Big Bear, 1973)
- Buck Clayton, Buck Clayton and Friends (Gitanes Jazz, 2007)
- Jimmy Dawkins, Jimmy Dawkins (Vogue, 1972)
- Jean-Jacques Debout, Jean-Jacques Debout (Vogue, 1964)
- Bill Doggett, Moondust (Odeon, 1959)
- Champion Jack Dupree, Champion Jack Dupree and His Blues Band Featuring Mickey Baker (Decca, 1967)
- Champion Jack Dupree, I'm Happy to Be Free (Vogue, 1972)
- Stefan Grossman, Friends Forever (Guitar Workshop, 2008)
- Coleman Hawkins, Disorder at the Border (Milan, 1989)
- Screamin' Jay Hawkins, At Home with Screamin' Jay Hawkins (Epic, 1958)
- Screamin' Jay Hawkins, ...What That Is! (Philips, 1969)
- Little Willie John, Fever (King, 1956)
- Louis Jordan, Somebody Up There Digs Me (Mercury, 1957)
- Booker T. Laury, Nothing but the Blues (Blue Silver, 1981)
- Booker T. Laury, Booker in Paris (EPM, 1992)
- Memphis Slim, Very Much Alive and in Montreux (Barclay, 1973)
- Jimmy Scott, If You Only Knew (Savoy, 2000)
- Sonny Terry & Brownie McGhee, Back Country Blues (CBS, 1958)
- Sylvie Vartan, Sylvie Vartan's Story 1962 & 1963 (RCA Camden, 1969)
