= Gumdrop (disambiguation) =

A gumdrop is a type of confectionery (candy).

Gumdrop or gum drop may also refer to:

- Gumdrop (book series), a series of children's books written and illustrated by Val Biro concerning an antique car called "Gumdrop"
- "Gum Drop" (song), a popular song written by Rudy Toombs, recorded by the Crew Cuts in 1955
- Gumdrop Seamount, a small seamount off the coast of Central California
- "Gum Drops", an episode of the sixth season of CSI: Crime Scene Investigation
- the command/service module (CSM) of the Apollo 9 mission
