= Benny Moten =

American jazz musician (1916–1977)

Benny Moten (November 30, 1916 – March 27, 1977) was an American jazz bassist.

Moten had a long career as a sideman from the early 1940s, including with Hot Lips Page, Jerry Jerome, Red Allen (1942–49, 1955–65 intermittently), Eddie South, Stuff Smith, Arnett Cobb, Ella Fitzgerald, Wilbur De Paris (1956–57), Buster Bailey, Roy Eldridge, and Dakota Staton (1961–63). Though he never recorded as a leader, he continued performing nearly until the time of his death.

== Discography ==
=== As sideman ===
- Red Allen, Feeling Good (Columbia, 1966)
- Ruth Brown, Ruth Brown (Atlantic, 1957)
- Ruth Brown, Miss Rhythm (Atlantic, 1959)
- Wilbur de Paris, Wilbur de Paris at Symphony Hall (Atlantic, 1957)
- Wilbur de Paris & Jimmy Witherspoon, Wilbur de Paris Plays & Jimmy Witherspoon Sings New Orleans Blues (Atlantic, 1957)
- Wilbur de Paris, Plays Cole Porter (Atlantic, 1958)
- Roy Eldridge, Swingin' on the Town (Verve, 1960)
- Rex Stewart, The Happy Jazz of Rex Stewart (Swingville, 1960)
