= Herb Lance =

American singer-songwriter (1925–2006)

Herbert J. Lance (June 12, 1925 – November 7, 2006) was an American jazz, blues and gospel singer, songwriter, record producer, recording studio owner and radio DJ. As well as recording several hits himself in the late 1940s, he co-wrote Ruth Brown's signature song, "Mama, He Treats Your Daughter Mean".

== Biography ==
Herb Lance was born in Georgetown, South Carolina, and lived there until he signed up to the US Army in 1944. In 1948 he made his first recording backed by the Ray Abrams Sextet, for Bob Shad's "Sittin' In With" record label. His first success came with his version of the Bernice Petkere song "Close Your Eyes", which reached #4 on the Billboard R&B chart (called the Race Records chart at the time) in 1949. Two further single releases later the same year also made the R&B chart: "Because" (#8) and "That Lucky Old Sun" (#6). Lance performed around the country in 1950, including a residency in Baltimore with the Cootie Williams band, and a series of one-nighters in Ohio with Roy Brown. Later records on "Sittin' In With" were less successful, and in September 1950 he started recording for Columbia Records, before headlining for a week at the Apollo Theater in New York City the following month. His single releases for Columbia failed to make the charts, and in 1951 he was moved to the subsidiary OKeh label, before signing with Mercury Records in Chicago.

As well as performing around the country, Lance also wrote songs. According to Atlantic Records producer Herb Abramson, Lance wrote "Mama, He Treats Your Daughter Mean" with his friend Johnny Wallace (the brother of boxer Coley Wallace), after the pair had heard a blues singer on the street in Atlanta, Georgia, singing a mournful song that included the title line. Although singer Ruth Brown initially disliked the song, she was persuaded by Lance and Wallace to record it, and did so in December 1952 after Abramson had speeded up its tempo. "Mama, He Treats Your Daughter Mean" became Brown's third #1 hit on the R&B chart, in 1953, and her first pop chart hit. In some later versions, the song's authorship was also co-credited to Charles Singleton, with whom Lance wrote a number of other less commercially successful songs in the 1950s.

In 1953 Lance was reported to be facing court action taken by a dancer who claimed he had assaulted her backstage in New York. He recorded unsuccessfully for the Bruce label in New York, before joining the Dizzy Gillespie Orchestra in 1955 as a vocalist and touring with Gillespie in the US and Europe. In 1956, the orchestra, with Lance as vocalist and also featuring arrangers Quincy Jones and Melba Liston, toured Asia, visiting Lebanon, Iran, Turkey, Pakistan and elsewhere, with Lance being described as "pouring his heart" into some spirituals. He also recorded with Gillespie, before recommencing his solo singing career on the DeLuxe label in Cincinnati, Ohio in 1957. He released further singles in the late 1950s on the Mala and Castle labels, before having his only pop hit in 1961 when his version of "Blue Moon" recorded with vocal group the Classics on the Promo label, in a similar style to the more successful recording by the Marcels, reached #50 on the Billboard pop chart.

In 1961 Lance, billed as "Cousin Herb", started working as a DJ on radio station WERD in Atlanta. He also set up a record production company in Atlanta with his friend Calvin Arnold. They produced and released several soul singles during the 1960s at their Atlanta Sound Studio, by singers including Grover Mitchell and Billy Byrd, several on their Cindy label, named after Lance's wife. In 1966, Lance issued an LP, The Comeback, on Chess Records (LP1506). Lance and Arnold continued to act as the executive producers of soul and disco recordings at their studio through the 1970s, including the 1973 soundtrack album, The Burning of Atlanta. Lance also later released gospel recordings.

He died in 2006, aged 81.
