= Vann "Piano Man" Walls =

American musician (1918–1999)

Background information
- Born: Harry Eugene Vann; 24 August 1918
- Origin: Middlesboro, Kentucky
- Died: 24 February 1999 (aged 80)
- Genres: Blues, R&B
- Instrument: Piano
- Years active: 1930s-1990s
- Labels: Atlantic Records; Apollo Records; Derby Records; Columbia Records; MGM Records.

Vann "Piano Man" Walls (born Harry Eugene Vann, 24 August 1918 – 24 February 1999) was an American rhythm and blues piano player, songwriter, studio musician and professional recording artist. He was a long-standing session player for Atlantic Records, appearing on hits by artists including Big Joe Turner, Ruth Brown and The Clovers. Walls performed under a number of different names and is variously credited as Van Walls, Harry Van Walls and Captain Van. He led the Harry Van Walls Orchestra and also performed with Doc Starkes and His Nite Riders and as Le Capitaine Van.

== Early life and career ==
Walls was born in Middlesboro, Kentucky, and grew up in Charleston, West Virginia. His mother was in her teens (Walls believed she was 13) when he was born. Vann took the name Walls from a man she would marry a few years later, and became Vann Walls (often written as Van Walls). His mother began teaching him piano when he was six years old, and his first experience performing music was in church.

Walls recalls developing his signature performing style of playing while "stand-up dancing" in Charleston's Holy Sanctified Church. His early playing shows the influence of jump blues player Jay McShann. In his late teens, Walls toured the Southern United States with carnivals, circuses, and variety caravans. He returned to Charleston in his 20s. where he played in local clubs and had a Saturday afternoon show on WCHS (AM) radio. It was here that bandleader Cal Greer heard Walls, and invited him to join his band, which toured coal-mining camps. After Greer's band broke up, Walls formed his own band, based in Columbus, Ohio.

In the late 1940s, saxophonist Frank "Floorshow" Culley came to Columbus and heard Walls play. Culley invited Walls to join the new Atlantic Records label in New York City as Atlantic's house band pianist. After some initial reluctance, Walls agreed.

== The Atlantic years ==
Walls arrived at Atlantic in September 1949. He was noted for his unique appearance (Sherlock Holmes pipe, deer-stalker cap and a cloak) and for his distinctive sound.

Walls' first recordings at Atlantic were with Frank Culley's band, but he soon began working with Brownie McGhee and his brother, Stick McGhee, at Savoy. Over the next few years, Walls would become almost ubiquitous on Atlantic's R&B records. Ahmet Ertegun, the company's founder and CEO, said Walls was "by far the finest blues pianist to be found anywhere on the East Coast. Ruth Brown, who had a string of hits with Atlantic, credits Walls with much of her success. Walls appeared on all of Atlantic's early recordings by Big Joe Turner, including his hit "Chains of Love", early copies credited Walls but on later issues his name was dropped and credited to only Ertegun, but Ruth Brown claims it was Walls song.

While he is best known during these years for his Atlantic sessions, during the heyday of R&B Walls also appeared on songs released by other labels, including London, Grand, Apollo, Teen, Sound, MGM, Swan, Sue, Chime, Cherry, Smash, Courtesy, Capitol, Savoy, Memo, Derby, King, and Columbia.

Notable songs either written by Walls or featuring his musicianship while he was at Atlantic include the following:

- "Sweet Sixteen" (Big Joe Turner)
- "Chains of Love" (Big Joe Turner)
- "5-10-15 Hours" (Ruth Brown)
- "One Mint Julep" (The Clovers)
- "Tomorrow Night" (LaVern Baker)
- "Any Time, Any Place, Anywhere" (Laurie Tate)

In addition to his work backing other musicians, Walls released a few recordings under his own name. In 1950, Walls recorded and released the single "Tee Nah Nah"/"Ain't Gonna Scold You" on Atlantic (catalog 904) which featured vocals by Spider Sam (the pseudonym used by Brownie McGhee). The band was credited as the "After Hour Session Boys". Walls also recorded and released the 1950 single "Easter Parade"/"Air Mail Boogie" on Derby Records (catalog 733) with vocals by Freddie Mitchell as well as the 1950 single "Chocolate Candy Blues" on Columbia Records (catalog 30220).

His last known appearance for Atlantic was on Big Joe Turner's "Boogie Woogie Country Girl", recorded in November 1955. In September 1959, he made his final recording appearance from this period, on the Memo label, backing Danny "Run Joe" Taylor, who was credited as Little Eddie Mint.

== Montreal years and later career ==
In 1954, Walls joined the Nite Riders, a band based in Philadelphia (they would later move to Hartford, Connecticut, where they opened their own recording studio). The group primarily appeared on the Apollo Records label, though in 1957 they recorded a one-off single for MGM Records. During the early 1960s, they also made appearances on various other labels, including Cherry, Chime, Smash, and Courtesy.

The Nite Riders toured extensively in the northeastern US and eastern Canada. In 1955, they played Montreal's famed Esquire Show Bar, an R&B hot-spot, for 19 weeks. It was while in Montreal in the early 1960s that Walls met his future wife, Ruth Palevsky, who ran the kitchen at the Black Bottom, an after-hours jazz club in Old Montreal. They married in 1963, and Walls stayed in the city, dropping into obscurity after the Nite Riders broke up in the mid-1960s. By the 1970s, he was reduced to touring small towns in Quebec, and playing taverns and small-time gigs at venues such as Royal Canadian Legion halls in Montreal. A poster from this era describes him as performing "Musique Haïtienne" (Haitian music).

Walls began to re-emerge in the 1990s, starting with a concert on May 18, 1990, in Brooklyn Heights, New York, where he appeared with his former piano student, Mac Rebennack, aka Dr. John. Walls and Rebennack would perform together again a few months later, at the Montreal International Jazz Festival. He would go on to play at numerous other jazz and blues festivals over the rest of the decade.

While being interviewed for a documentary by Montreal filmmaker Steven Morris, Walls said he wanted to record one more album as bandleader,. Morris arranged for studio time, and over two days Walls and Montreal's Stephen Barry Band recorded his final CD: In the Evening. Released in 1997, and produced by Morris and René Moisan, it was nominated for a Juno Award in the "Best Blues Album" category.

In 1997, Walls was also recognized with a Pioneer Award from the Rhythm and Blues Foundation, along with musicians including Smokey Robinson and the Miracles, The Four Tops, Clarence "Gatemouth" Brown, and Gary U.S. Bonds.

Walls died of cancer in Montreal, on February 24, 1999. He played piano in the cancer ward almost until the day of his death.

== Legacy ==
After seeing Walls' Montreal jazz festival performance with Dr. John, music historian and writer Craig Morrison tracked Walls down, and later introduced him to his friend Steven Morris, who worked at the National Film Board of Canada. Morris began filming Walls with a professional crew in 1993, in hopes of eventually releasing a documentary about him.

After numerous delays, the film Vann "Piano Man" Walls: The Spirit of R&B was released in October 2013, premiering at the Festival du nouveau cinéma.

Directed by Steven Morris, and produced by Morris and Martin Bolduc, the documentary features footage of Walls recording his final album, as well as various live performances, his appearance at the Rhythm & Blues Foundation awards gala, and interviews with Ahmet Ertegun, Jerry Wexler, Dr. John, Smokey Robinson, Ruth Brown, Ry Cooder, and others.

In addition, Canadian musician Michael Jerome Brown, who appeared on In the Evening, wrote the track "Cancer Ward Blues" for Walls, and dedicated it to him. It was released on Brown's 2001 album entitled Drive On.

On October 24, 2015, Walls was inducted into the West Virginia Music Hall of Fame.

== Discography ==
With Ruth Brown

- Ruth Brown (Atlantic, 1957)
