= Late Date with Ruth Brown =

Studio album by Ruth Brown
- Released: 1959
- Recorded: January 27 and February 2 & 5, 1959; NYC
- Genre: Jazz
- Length: 36:03
- Label: Atlantic; 1308
- Producer: Ahmet Ertegun, Nesuhi Ertegun

Ruth Brown chronology
Miss Rhythm (1959)	Late Date with Ruth Brown (1959)	Along Comes Ruth (1962)

Late Date with Ruth Brown is an album by vocalist Ruth Brown featuring tracks recorded in 1959 and released on the Atlantic label.

== Reception ==
Professional ratings
Review scores
Source	Rating
Allmusic	4/5 stars

Allmusic awarded the album 4 stars stating "this session reminded those who had forgotten that Brown could also hold her own with sophisticated material as well as sexy stuff".

== Track listing ==
1. "It Could Happen to You" (Jimmy Van Heusen, Johnny Burke) – 3:07
2. "Why Don't You Do Right?" (Kansas Joe McCoy) – 2:12
3. "Bewitched, Bothered and Bewildered" (Richard Rodgers, Lorenz Hart) – 4:32
4. "I'm Just a Lucky So-and-So" (Duke Ellington, Mack David) – 3:32
5. "I Can Dream, Can't I?" (Sammy Fain, Irving Kahal) – 2:36
6. "You and the Night and the Music" (Arthur Schwartz, Howard Dietz) – 2:31
7. "You'd Be So Nice to Come Home To" (Cole Porter) – 1:52
8. "We'll Be Together Again" (Carl T. Fischer, Frankie Laine) – 4:18
9. "I'm Beginning to See the Light" (Ellington, Don George, Johnny Hodges, Harry James) – 2:28
10. "I Loves You, Porgy" (George Gershwin, Ira Gershwin) – 2:42
11. "No One Ever Tells You" (Hub Atwood, Carroll Coates) – 4:06
12. "Let's Face the Music and Dance" (Irving Berlin) – 2:07

== Personnel ==
- Ruth Brown – vocal
- Joe Cabot, Bernie Glow, Ernie Royal, Doc Severinsen – trumpet (tracks 4, 6, 11 & 12)
- Bob Alexander (tracks 2, 4–7, 9, 11 & 12), Morton Bullman (tracks 2, 5, 7 & 9), Mervin Gold (tracks 4, 6, 11 & 12), Frank Rehak (tracks 2, 4–7, 9, 11 & 12), Chauncey Welsch (tracks 2, 4–7, 9, 11 & 12) – trombone
- Romeo Penque – alto saxophone, oboe, flute (tracks 1, 3, 4, 6, 8 & 10–12)
- George Berg – tenor saxophone flute (tracks 1, 3, 4, 6, 8 & 10–12)
- Phil Bodner, Jerry Sanfino, Joe Soldo – saxophone (tracks 4, 6, 11 & 12)
- Hank Jones – piano
- Al Caiola (tracks 1, 3, 8 & 10), Mundell Lowe (tracks 2, 4–7, 9, 11 & 12) – guitar
- Milt Hinton – bass
- Sol Gubin (tracks 4, 6, 11 & 12), Don Lamond (tracks 1–3, 5 & 7–10) – drums
- Arnold Eidus, Felix Giglio, Harry Katzman, Harry Melnikoff, Julius Held, Leo Kruczek, Tony Bambino – violin (tracks 1, 3, 8 & 10)
- Eugene Orloff – violin, concertmaster (tracks 1, 3, 8 & 10)
- Richard Wess – arranger, conductor
