= Flawed Mangoes =

American musician

- Origin: Boston, Massachusetts
- Genres: Post rock; ambient; shoegaze; folktronica
- Years active: 2020–present
- Label: Atlantic

Evan Lo, better known as Flawed Mangoes, is an American singer-songwriter and musician from Boston.

== Early life and education ==
Lo was raised in Newton, Massachusetts, and is of Chinese descent. His parents put him in piano lessons when he was a child. When Lo was in middle school, he gained interest in rock music and began playing the guitar, which then led to him playing in bands with his friends when he was in high school.

Lo attended college in Rochester, New York where he enrolled in an audio engineering program.

== Career ==
While he was in college, Lo began releasing music under the moniker Fla.mingo, but got little traction.

Lo's releases under the moniker Flawed Mangoes went viral online in 2023, after being frequently used to accompany "hopecore" videos on TikTok and related platforms.

In July 2023 Lo released the song "Killswitch Lullaby" which went viral.

In April 2024, Lo signed to APG Music and released the EP The Unwavering Hand the following September.

== Discography ==
=== Albums ===
- Killswitch Melodies (2023)
- The Unwavering Hand (2024)
- Anomaly III (2025)
- Anomaly IV (2025)
- Afterlife (2026)
- Naturally Occurring Music (2026)

=== EPs ===
- Nothing Good Will Come of This (2020)
- Anomaly I (2025)
- Anomaly II (2025)

=== Singles ===
- Show You (2020)
- I Am No Fun (2020)
- Fatal Flaw (2020)
- Goodbye (2020)
- No Motivation (2020)
- 2am (2021)
- ULTRAMAGNET (2021)
- Killswitch Lullaby (2023)
- The Beginning / Birdsong (2023)
- Riff 2 (2023)
- Swimming (2024)
- Run On Sentence (Acoustic) (2024)
- The Beginning (Acoustic) (2024)
- Dramamine / Fragility (2024)
- Cold (2024)
- Cold (Acoustic) (2024)
- Sleepwalking (2024)
- Tunnel Vision (2024)
- Take Your Aim (w/ Scarlet House) (2024)
- Leave a Message (w/ aldn) (2024)
- Sunday Scaries (2024)
- Anthem (2025)
- Horse (2026)
- Dark (2026)
- Charts (2026)
