= Frank Culley =

American musician (1917–1991)

- Also known as: Frank "Floorshow" Culley
- Born: Frank Windsol Culley; August 17, 1917; Petsworth, Gloucester County, Virginia, U.S.
- Died: 15 April 1991 (aged 73) Newark, New Jersey, U.S.
- Genres: R&B
- Occupations: Saxophonist and bandleader
- Instrument: Saxophone
- Labels: Atlantic Records; Coral Records; RCA Victor; Chess Records; Parrot Records

Frank Windsol Culley (August 17, 1917 – April 15, 1991), sometimes credited as Frank "Floorshow" Culley, was an American R&B saxophonist and bandleader who recorded successfully from the 1940s and was the first leader of the Atlantic Records house band.

== Biography ==
He was born in Petsworth, Gloucester County, Virginia (though some sources give Salisbury, Maryland), and grew up in Norfolk. He learned to play the tenor saxophone, and began playing in local bands before turning professional as a member of Johnson's Happy Pals in Richmond. In the mid-1940s, he formed his own band, and began recording accompaniments for artists including Wynonie Harris, on several small labels, before joining Atlantic Records as their house band leader in 1948. His band backed many of Atlantic's most successful R&B artists of the period, with the recordings often featuring Culley's pianist, Harry Van Walls. Culley also recorded under his own name, having a No. 11 R&B hit in 1949 with his version of the instrumental "Cole Slaw", originally written (as "Sorghum Switch") by Jesse Stone and also recorded by Louis Jordan. At the end of 1949, another Culley recording, "After Hour Session", reached No. 10 on the Billboard R&B chart.

Culley left the Atlantic label in 1951. He later recorded, with little commercial success, for other labels including Coral, RCA Victor, Chess, and – with singer Jimmy Rushing – for Parrot.In 1955, Culley recorded several tracks on one of the first rock and roll LPs, Rock'n'Roll Instrumentals for Dancing the Lindy Hop, released on the Baton label, with the other tracks performed by the Buddy Tate Orchestra. The following year, Culley featured in one of the first rock and roll stage shows in New York City, hosted by Hal Jackson and which also featured The Cadillacs and Screamin' Jay Hawkins.

After continuing to perform in clubs, Culley retired from the music business in 1975, and moved to Newark, New Jersey, where he died aged 73 in 1991.
