= Gloria Lynne =

American jazz singer (1929–2013)

- Also known as: Gloria Alleyne (married name)
- Born: Gloria Wilson; November 23, 1929; Harlem, New York City, U.S.
- Died: October 15, 2013 (aged 83) Newark, New Jersey, U.S.
- Genre: Jazz
- Instrument: Singing
- Years active: 1958–2007
- Labels: Everest, ABC

Gloria Lynne (born Gloria Wilson; November 23, 1929 – October 15, 2013), also known as Gloria Alleyne, was an American jazz vocalist with a recording career spanning from 1958 to 2007.

== Early life ==
Lynne was born in Harlem in 1929 to John and Mary Wilson, a gospel singer. She grew up in Harlem, and as a young girl, Lynne sang with the local African Methodist Episcopal Zion Church Choir.

== Career ==
At the age of 15, she won first prize at the Amateur Night contest at the Apollo Theater. She shared the stage with contemporary night club vocal ensembles, and recorded as part of such groups as the Enchanters and the Dell-Tones in the 1950s. As a soloist she recorded under her birth name, although most of her work was released under her stage name on the Everest, with whom she signed in 1958, and Fontana labels.

Although showing much promise early on, especially after TV appearances, including Harry Belafonte's New York 19 (1960) and The Ed Sullivan Show (1961), her development suffered through poor management. Some unscrupulous recording executives profited while she had limited financial resources—a victim of unpaid royalties—and only saved by the fact that she was able to work steadily and earn her money from live performances.

During her earlier years on the road, Lynne shared bills with RnB, jazz, traditional pop music, and pop singers including Ray Charles, Billy Eckstine, Johnny Mathis and Ella Fitzgerald. TV specials include two with Harry Belafonte. She wrote lyrics for "Watermelon Man" with Herbie Hancock, and "All Day Long" with Kenny Burrell. Her final recording was "I Wish It Would Snow" featuring Bucky Pizzarelli. The song was featured in the 2014 Lifetime movie Seasons of Love, starring Gladys Knight and Taraji P. Henson.

New York City proclaimed July 25, 1995 as "Gloria Lynne Day."

== Personal life ==
She and her husband, Harry Alleyne, had a son, Richard. Gloria and Richard Alleyne ran a production company, Family Bread Music Inc.

She died of a heart attack on October 15, 2013, in Newark, New Jersey, at the age of 83.

== Awards ==
In 1996, Lynne received the International Women of Jazz Award, and she was honored with a Pioneer Award by the Rhythm and Blues Foundation in 1997. Other awards and recognition include the National Treasure Award from the Seasoned Citizens Theatre Company (2003); induction into the National Black Sports and Entertainment Hall of Fame; Living Legend Award from the State of Pennsylvania (2007). In 2008, Lynne was presented with a special award for "Outstanding Achievement In Jazz", at the New York MAC Awards. In 2010, she was honored at New York's Schomburg Library, for her many contributions to the music industry and the world by Great Women In Music and its founder Roz Nixon. Roz Nixon Entertainment worked successfully with Lynne throughout her final years, producing, co-producing or participating in making the arrangements for Ms. Lynne's appearances pertaining to her last concerts or significant events.

== Charted singles ==
Year	Single	Chart Positions		Label
Year	Single	US Pop	US R&B	Label
1961	"The Jazz in You"	109	—	Everest
1961	"He Needs Me"	111	—	Everest
1961	"Impossible"	95	16	Everest
1961	"You Don't Have To Be A Tower Of Strength"	100	—	Everest
1964	"I Wish You Love"	28	3	Everest
1964	"I Should Care"	64	47	Everest
1964	"Be Anything (but Be Mine)"	88	40	Fontana
1964	"Don't Take Your Love From Me"	76	—	Everest
1965	"Watermelon Man"	62	8	Fontana

== Discography ==
=== As a member of the Dell-Tones ===
Recorded	Title	Label	Format	Catalogue No.
1953	"Yours Alone"/"My Heart's on Fire"	Brunswick	45 r.p.m.	84015
1954	"Little Short Daddy"/"I'm Not in Love with You"	Rainbow	45 r.p.m.	244

=== Singles as leader ===
Recorded	Title	Label	Format	Catalogue No.
1954	"When I Say My Prayer"/"The Uncloudy Day"	Josie	45 r.p.m.	767
1959	"June Night"/"Perdido"	Everest	45 r.p.m.	19303
1959	"But Not for Me"/"Just in Time"	Everest	45 r.p.m.	19308
1960	"Be My Love"/"My Prayer for You"	Everest	45 r.p.m.	19326
1960	"Happiness Is Just a Thing Called Joe"/"My Reverie"	Everest	45 r.p.m.	19337
1960	"June Night"/"Perdido"	Everest	45 r.p.m.	19343
1960	"Am I Blue"/"Little Girl Blue"	Everest	45 r.p.m.	19346
1960	"They Didn't Believe Me"/"Without a Song"	Everest	45 r.p.m.	19347
1960	"Gypsy Boy"/"Recommended to Love"	Everest	45 r.p.m.	19367
1960	"Condemned Without Trial"/"Dreamy"	Everest	45 r.p.m.	19373
1960	"The Jazz in You"/"Love, I've Found You"	Everest	45 r.p.m.	19390
1961	"He Needs Me"/"The Lamp Is Low"	Everest	45 r.p.m.	19409
1961	"Impossible"/"This Little Boy of Mine"	Everest	45 r.p.m.	19418
1961	"You Don't Have to Be a Tower of Strength"/"I Will Follow You"	Everest	45 r.p.m.	19428
1962	"And This Is My Beloved"/"I'm Glad There Is You"	Everest	45 r.p.m.	19431
1962	"I Know Love"/"It Just Happened to Me"	Everest	45 r.p.m.	2008
1963	"I'll Buy You a Star"/"Record Company Blues"	Everest	45 r.p.m.	2023
1963	"Humming Blues"/"Stormy Monday Blues"	Everest	45 r.p.m.	2030
1964	"I Wish You Love"/"Through a Long and Sleepless Night"	Everest	45 r.p.m.	2036
1964	"I Should Care"/"Indian Love Call"	Everest	45 r.p.m.	2042
1964	"Don't Take Your Love from Me"/"You Don't Know What Love Is"	Everest	45 r.p.m.	2044
1964	"Serenade in Blue"/"Without a Song"	Everest	45 r.p.m.	2047
1964	"On Christmas Day"/"Wouldn't It Be Loverly"	Everest	45 r.p.m.	2051
1965	"Fly Me to the Moon"/"The Night Has A Thousand Eyes"	Everest	45 r.p.m.	2055
1965	"Out of This World"/"Squeeze Me"	Everest	45 r.p.m.	2058
1965	"Lonely Street"/"Try a Little Tenderness"	Everest	45 r.p.m.	2059
1965	"The Folks Who Live on the Hill"/"That's a Joy"	Everest	45 r.p.m.	2061
1965	"My Devotion"/"I'm Glad There Is You"	Everest	45 r.p.m.	2062
1959	"Little Boy Blues"/"Way Beyond the Hills"	Seeco	45 r.p.m.	6037
1961	"Is There Someone for Me"/"I'm Not Afraid Anymore"	Seeco	45 r.p.m.	6077
1964	"Be Anything (but Be Mine)"/"Soul Serenade"	Fontana	45 r.p.m.	1890
1965	"The Touch of Your Lips"/"Intimate Moments"	Fontana	45 r.p.m.	1507
1965	"Watermelon Man"/"All Alone"	Fontana	45 r.p.m.	1511
1965	"Whisperers"/"I Understand"	Fontana	45 r.p.m.	1523
1966	"Sometimes It Be's That Way"/"Speaking of Happiness"	Fontana	45 r.p.m.	1538
1966	"Strangers in the Night"/"Hey, Candy Man"	Fontana	45 r.p.m.	1554
1966	"Money Machine"/"I Got What You Want"	Fontana	45 r.p.m.	1560
1967	"Love Is"/"It's Not the Truth"	Fontana	45 r.p.m.	1567
1967	"Foolish Dreamer"/"I Can't Stand It"	Fontana	45 r.p.m.	1594
1968	"Down Here on the Ground"/"I've Never Been Loved Before"	Fontana	45 r.p.m.	1617
1968	"The Guy Who Lived Up There"/"Hold Back the Dawn"	Fontana	45 r.p.m.	1627
1969	"I've Got to Be Someone"/"Problem Child"	Fontana	45 r.p.m.	1639
1969	"Darlin'"/"No Easy Way Down"	Fontana	45 r.p.m.	1660
1969	"Hold It"/"Untouched By Human Love"	Fontana	45 r.p.m.	1674
1966	"I Wish You Love"/"A Long Long Story"	Hi Fi	45 r.p.m.	5103
1970	"If You Don't Get It Yourself"/"Love's Finally Found Me"	Canyon	45 r.p.m.	36
1970	"Seems Like I Gotta Do Wrong"/"Take You All the Way"	Roker	45 r.p.m.	504
1972	"Never My Love"/"The Summer Knows"	Mercury	45 r.p.m.	73267
1972	"Just Let Me Be Me"/"Kickin' Life"	Mercury	45 r.p.m.	73294
1976	"Out of This World"/"Thank You, Early Bird"	ABC Impulse	45 r.p.m.	31003
2012	"I Wish It Would Snow"	(LC Wells, LC Wells Music, LLC)		

=== Albums as leader ===
Recorded	Title	Label	Format	Catalogue No.
1958	Miss Gloria Lynne (with Wild Bill Davis and His Group)	Everest	LP	BR-5022
1959	Lonely And Sentimental (with Melba Liston orchestra)	Everest	LP	BR-5063
1960	Try A Little Tenderness (with LeRoy Holmes orchestra)	Everest	LP	BR-5090
1960	Day In, Day Out (with Ernie Wilkins and His Orchestra)	Everest	LP	BR-5101
1961	I'm Glad There Is You (with the Earl May Trio)	Everest	LP	BR-5126
1961	He Needs Me (with Jimmy Jones and His Orchestra)	Everest	LP	BR-5128
1961	This Little Boy Of Mine	Everest	LP	BR-5131
1962	Gloria Lynne At Basin Street East (with the Earl May Trio)	Everest	LP	BR-5137
1962	Gloria Blue (compilation)	Everest	LP	BR-5203
1963	Gloria Lynne At The Las Vegas Thunderbird (with the Herman Foster Trio)	Everest	LP	BR-5208
1963	Gloria, Marty & Strings (with Marty Paich and His Orchestra)	Everest	LP	BR-5220
1964	I Wish You Love (compilation)	Everest	LP	BR-5226
1964	Glorious (reissue of Miss Gloria Lynne)	Everest	LP	BR-5228
1964	After Hours (reissue of Lonely And Sentimental)	Everest	LP	BR-5230
1964	The Best Of Gloria Lynne (compilation)	Everest	LP	BR-5231
1964	Intimate Moments	Fontana	LP	SRF-67528
1965	Soul Serenade	Fontana	LP	SRF-67541
1965	Love And A Woman	Fontana	LP	SRF-67546
1966	Go! Go! Go! (reissue of Day In, Day Out)	Everest	LP	BR-5237
1966	Where It's At	Fontana	LP	SRF-67555
1967	Gloria	Fontana	LP	SRF-67561
1967	The Other Side Of Gloria Lynne	Fontana	LP	SRF-67571
1968	Here, There & Everywhere	Fontana	LP	SRF-67577
1969	The Best Of Gloria Lynne (compilation)	Fontana	LP	SRF-67589
1970	Happy And In Love	Canyon	LP	7709
1972	A Very Gentle Sound	Mercury	LP	SRM-1-633
1974	Gloria Lynne Greatest Hits By Popular Demand	Paul Winley	LP	LP-122
1976	I Don't Know How To Love Him	ABC Impulse	LP	ASD-9311
1977	Love's Finally Found Me (with Stanley Turrentine)	Versatile	LP	NED-1122
1993	No Detour Ahead	Muse	CD	MR-5414
1994	A Time for Love	Muse	CD	MR-5381
1997	This One's On Me	HighNote	CD	HCD 7015
2007	From My Heart to Yours	HighNote	CD	HCD 7162
