= This Little Girl's Gone Rockin' =

- single

Song by Ruth Brown
- B-side: "Why Me"
- Released: August 25, 1958
- Genre: Rhythm and blues
- Length: 1:48
- Label: Atlantic Records
- Songwriters: Bobby Darin; Mann Curtis

"This Little Girl's Gone Rockin" is a 1958 rhythm and blues single performed by Ruth Brown and released on Atlantic Records as Atlantic 1197 in the week of August 25. The song was written by Bobby Darin and Mann Curtis. It reached number 24 in Billboard's pop charts.

It was later covered by Glenda Collins, but her version remained unissued until the 1990s. Similarly Alma Cogan recorded it in 1958, but this was also unissued at the time. A version by Janice Peters was released in the UK in 1958 but was not a hit.

In 2006, Hummer used the song in one of their H3 commercials. Rosie Flores covered the song on her 2009 album Girl Of The Century recorded with The Pine Valley Cosmonauts released on Bloodshot Records.
