= A Good Day for the Blues =

Studio album by Ruth Brown
- Released: 1999
- Studio: Ultrasonic
- Genre: Blues, R&B
- Label: Bullseye Blues
- Producer: Scott Billington

Ruth Brown chronology
R + B = Ruth Brown (1997)	A Good Day for the Blues (1999)

A Good Day for the Blues is an album by the American musician Ruth Brown, released in 1999 via Bullseye Blues. After recovering from health ailments, Brown supported the album with several concert dates. The album was nominated for a Grammy Award for "Best Traditional Blues Album". A Good Day for the Blues was Brown's final studio album.

== Production ==
Produced by Scott Billington, the album was recorded at Ultransonic Studios, in New Orleans. "I Believe I Can Fly" is a cover of the R. Kelly song. Brown learned to perform "Cabbage Head" during her childhood. Dan Penn wrote "Be Good to Me Tonight" and "Can't Stand a Broke Man". "True" is a cover of the Paul Gayten song. Duke Robillard played guitar on A Good Day for the Blues. Wardell Quezergue worked on some of the song arrangements. A couple of the songs contain spoken word passages by Brown.

== Critical reception ==
Professional ratings
Review scores
Source	Rating
AllMusic	3/5 stars
The Atlanta Constitution	B+
The Encyclopedia of Popular Music	3/5 stars
The Penguin Guide to Blues Recordings	2.5/4 stars
Pittsburgh Post-Gazette	3.5/4 stars
The Sunday Age	4/5 stars

The Sunday Age wrote that "Good Day represents the best, horn-driven, vintage R&B put out today." The Atlanta Constitution noted that, "with Brown's experience, she's able to seamlessly explore the tricky territory between blues and jazz with ease." The Pittsburgh Post-Gazette deemed the album "a tribute to her vocal skills—if anything, better with age, a voice full of whiskey and wry." The Chicago Tribune determined that it leans "more on sassy, rambling story-songs like 'H.B.'s Funky Fable' than her classic belting style."

== Track listing ==
No.	Title	Length
1.	"Good Day for the Blues"
2.	"Can't Stand a Broke Man"
3.	"Never Let Me Go"
4.	"Hangin' by a Shoestring"
5.	"H.B.'s Funky Fable"
6.	"A Lover Is Forever"
7.	"Ice Water in Your Veins"
8.	"True"
9.	"Cabbage Head"
10.	"The Richest One"
11.	"Be Good to Me Tonight"
12.	"I Believe I Can Fly"
