= Rhythm and Blues Foundation =

Organization

Rhythm & Blues Foundation
- Founded: 1988
- Location: Philadelphia
- Key people: Damon Williams (Chairman); Jeff Harleston (Executive Committee); Bruce Resnikoff (Executive Committee) Iris Gordy (Executive Committee) Claudette Robinson (Executive Committee) Ted Reid (Executive Committee)
- Website: www.rhythmandbluesfoundation.org

The Rhythm and Blues Foundation is an independent American nonprofit organization dedicated to the historical and cultural preservation of rhythm and blues music.

The idea for the foundation came in 1987 during discussions about royalties with entertainer Ruth Brown, entertainment attorney Howell Begle, and Ahmet Ertegun, the head of Atlantic Records. Ertegun provided a $1.5 million donation, and the foundation was officially established in 1988 in Washington, D.C., and in 2005 moved its offices to Philadelphia, Pennsylvania. The foundation provides financial support, medical assistance and educational outreach through various grants and programs to support R&B and Motown artists from the 1940s through the 1970s.

The Rhythm and Blues Foundation has also produced their Annual event the Pioneer Awards since the 1980s, then under the Direction of Suzan Jenkins, Executive Director. It also administered the Doc Pomus Financial Assistance Program, The Motown/Universal Music Group Fund, and the Gwendolyn B. Gordy Fuqua Fund providing emergency assistance to legendary aging artists.

== Pioneer Award honorees ==
2008

- Al Bell (Leadership Award)
- Sugar Pie DeSanto
- Donny Hathaway (Legacy Tribute Award)
- The Funk Brothers (Sidemen Award)
- Chaka Khan (Lifetime Achievement Award)
- Kool & The Gang
- Teena Marie
- The Whispers
- Bill Withers

2006

- Thom Bell (Entrepreneur Award)
- Frankie Beverly
- Chubby Checker
- The Delfonics
- Berry Gordy (Lifetime Achievement Award)
- Bettye LaVette
- Barbara Mason
- Otis Redding (Legacy Tribute Award)

2003

- George Clinton
- The Del Vikings
- The Dixie Cups
- The Supremes
- Clarence "Frogman" Henry
- Hal Jackson
- Johnny Nash
- Maceo Parker
- Koko Taylor
- Dionne Warwick (Lifetime Achievement Award)
- Jackie Wilson (Legacy Tribute Award)

2001

- Allen Toussaint
- Big Jay McNeely
- Dee Dee Sharp
- The Emotions
- Fontella Bass
- Reverend Al Green (Lifetime Achievement Award)
- Holland-Dozier-Holland
- Louis Jordan (Legacy Tribute Award)
- Sly & the Family Stone

2000

- The Chi-Lites
- Ahmet Ertegun
- Marvin Gaye (Legacy Tribute Award)
- The Impressions
- Johnnie Johnson
- Clyde Otis
- Sylvia Robinson
- Huey "Piano" Smith
- Stevie Wonder (Lifetime Achievement Award)
- Betty Wright

1999

- Johnny Adams
- Ashford & Simpson
- Mickey Baker
- Sam Cooke (Legacy Tribute Award)
- Isaac Hayes & David Porter
- Brenda Holloway
- John Lee Hooker (Lifetime Achievement Award)
- Patti LaBelle & The Bluebells with original 4th member, Cindy Birdsong
- Barbara Lewis
- Barbara Lynn
- The Manhattans
- Garnet Mimms
- Johnny Moore
- Bill Pinkney
- Joe Simon
- Charlie Thomas
- Dee Dee Warwick

1998

- Herb Abramson
- Faye Adams
- Bobby Byrd
- Tyrone Davis
- The Five Satins
- The Harptones
- Screamin' Jay Hawkins
- Ernie K-Doe
- Gladys Knight & the Pips (Lifetime Achievement Award)
- The O'Jays
- David "Fathead" Newman
- Kim Weston

1997

- William Bell
- Gary U.S. Bonds
- Clarence "Gatemouth" Brown
- Gene Chandler
- The Four Tops (Lifetime Achievement Award)
- Little Milton
- Gloria Lynne
- The Miracles
- Ruby & The Romantics
- The Spinners
- Phil Upchurch
- Vann "Piano Man" Walls

1996

- Dave Bartholomew
- The Cadillacs
- The Chantels
- Bo Diddley (Lifetime Achievement Award)
- Betty Everett
- The Flamingos
- Eddie Floyd
- The Isley Brothers
- Jay McShann
- Johnnie Taylor
- Doris Troy
- Johnny "Guitar" Watson
- Bobby Womack

1995

- Booker T. & the M.G.'s
- Fats Domino (Lifetime Achievement Award)
- Inez and Charlie Foxx
- Cissy Houston
- Illinois Jacquet
- Darlene Love
- The Marvelettes
- The Moonglows
- Lloyd Price
- Arthur Prysock
- Mabel Scott
- Junior Walker
- Justine "Baby" Washington

1994

- Otis Blackwell
- Jerry Butler
- The Coasters/The Robins
- Clarence Carter
- Don Covay
- Bill Doggett
- Mable John
- Ben E. King
- Little Richard (Lifetime Achievement Award)
- Johnny Otis
- Earl Palmer
- The Shirelles
- Irma Thomas

1993

- Hadda Brooks
- James Brown & The Famous Flames (Lifetime Achievement Award)
- Solomon Burke
- Dave Clark
- Floyd Dixon
- David "Panama" Francis
- Lowell Fulson
- Erskine Hawkins
- Little Anthony & The Imperials
- Wilson Pickett
- Martha Reeves & The Vandellas
- Carla Thomas
- Jimmy Witherspoon

1992

- Hank Ballard & The Midnighters
- Bobby "Blue" Bland
- The Dells
- Aretha Franklin (Lifetime Achievement Award)
- Chuck Jackson
- Ella Johnson
- Nellie Lutcher
- The Staple Singers
- Jesse Stone
- Rufus Thomas
- Paul "Hucklebuck" Williams

1990/91

- Maxine Brown (soul singer)
- Ray Charles (Lifetime Achievement Award)
- The Five Keys
- Al Hibbler
- Albert King
- Jimmy McCracklin
- Curtis Mayfield
- Sam Moore
- Doc Pomus
- The Spaniels

1989

- LaVern Baker
- Charles Brown
- Ruth Brown
- The Clovers
- Etta James
- "Little" Jimmy Scott
- Percy Sledge
- Mary Wells
