= Mambo Baby =

"Mambo Baby" is a 1954 single written by Charles Singleton and Rose Marie McCoy, performed by Ruth Brown and Her Rhythmmakers and issued on the Atlantic label. The single was Ruth Brown's last number one on the R&B chart, where it spent one week.
