= Blues on Broadway =

Studio album by Ruth Brown
- Released: 1989
- Recorded: June 12–13, 1989
- Studio: RCA Studio C, New York
- Length: 58:12
- Label: Fantasy
- Producer: Ralph Jungheim

Ruth Brown chronology
You Don't Know Me (1978)	Blues on Broadway (1989)	Fine and Mellow (1991)

Blues on Broadway is an album by the American musician Ruth Brown, released in 1989 through Fantasy Records. The album earned Brown a Grammy Award for Best Jazz Vocal Performance, Female. It was produced by Ralph Jungheim. Hank Crawford played saxophone on several tracks.

== Critical reception ==
Professional ratings
Review scores
Source	Rating
Chicago Tribune	3/4 stars
The Rolling Stone Album Guide	4/5 stars

The Washington Post praised the "terrific remake of 'Good Morning Heartache'." The Chicago Tribune noted the "rich, wise voice shaped by hard-won experience and filled with deliciously wicked wit."

The Rolling Stone Album Guide wrote that "this is a woman who describes a life lived full measure every time she sings."

== Track listing ==
1. "Nobody Knows When You're Down and Out" – 5:39
2. "Good Morning Heartache" – 5:59
3. "If I Can't Sell It, I'll Keep Sittin' on It" – 5:26
4. "Tain't Nobody's Biz-Ness If I Do" – 9:25
5. "St. Louis Blues" – 9:35
6. "Am I Blue" – 5:58
7. "I'm Just a Lucky So and So" – 5:54
8. "I Don't Break Dance" – 5:23 (bonus track on CD)
9. "Come Sunday" – 5:25 (bonus track on CD)

== Personnel ==
- Ruth Brown – vocals
- Spanky Davis – trumpet
- Hank Crawford – alto saxophone (except on 2,5,7,8)
- Red Holloway – tenor saxophone
- Britt Woodman – trombone
- Bobby Forrester – leader, piano, Hammond B-3 organ
- Rodney Jones – guitar, banjo
- Al McKibbon – acoustic bass
- Grady Tate – drums
- George Horn – mastering
