= Gum Drop (song) =

Single by Otis Williams and the Charms
- Released: June 1955
- Recorded: 1955
- Genre: popular
- Label: De Luxe Records
- Songwriter: Rudy Toombs

"Gum Drop" is a popular song written by Rudy Toombs.

The original recording was by Otis Williams and the Charms (credited as "Otis Williams and His New Group"), released by De Luxe Records in June 1955 as catalog number 45-6090.

== The Crew-Cuts recording ==
The recording by The Crew-Cuts was released by Mercury Records as catalog number 70668. It first reached the Billboard magazine charts on August 27, 1955. On the Disk Jockey chart, it peaked at No. 14; on the Best Seller chart, at #10; on the Juke Box chart, at No. 20; on the composite chart of the top 100 songs, it reached No. 80. The peak at #80 on the top-100 list is misleading, however, because this list was begun after the song had reached its popularity peak, so it was headed off the list at that point. The flip side was "Present Arms" on some copies and "Song Of The Fool" on others.
