= Rudy Toombs =

American performer and songwriter (1914–1962)

- Born: Rudolph Toombs; 1914; Monroe, Louisiana, United States
- Died: November 28, 1962 (aged 47–48) New York, United States
- Genres: Jump blues, rhythm and blues, blues
- Occupation: Songwriter

Rudolph Toombs (1914 – November 28, 1962) was an American performer and songwriter. He wrote "Teardrops from My Eyes", Ruth Brown's first number one R&B song, and other hit songs for her, including "5-10-15 Hours". He also wrote "One Mint Julep" for The Clovers.

== History ==
Toombs was born in Monroe, Louisiana. He began as a vaudeville-style song-and-dance man and later became a productive lyricist and composer of doo-wop songs and rhythm and blues standards in the 1950s and 1960s. Some of his work was done at Atlantic Records, writing and arranging songs for Ahmet Ertegun. Toombs was murdered by robbers in the hallway of his apartment house in Harlem, New York, in 1962.

Ruth Brown credited Toombs as a major reason for her success. She describes him as joyful, exuberant man, so full of life that he passed that ebullience on to her. He taught her how to take a moody blues ballad and make it into a bouncy jump blues.

== Songs ==
Some of Toombs' best known songs are listed below.

- "Teardrops from My Eyes", a Rhythm and blues song for Ruth Brown, which was a hit for her in 1950
- "One Mint Julep", recorded by The Clovers (number 1 R&B in 1951), covered in an instrumental version by Ray Charles (number 1 R&B, Billboard Hot 100 number 8 in 1961)
- "5-10-15 Hours", recorded by Ruth Brown (number 1 R&B in 1951)
- "I Cried and Cried" recorded by Varetta Dillard in 1952
- "One Scotch, One Bourbon, One Beer", recorded in 1953 by Amos Milburn
- "I Get a Thrill" recorded by Wynonie Harris in 1954
- "Thinking and Drinking"
- "Gum Drop", a 1955 hit for Otis Williams and the Charms, covered by The Crew-Cuts that year
- "I'm Shakin'", a hit for Little Willie John in 1960, covered by The Blasters in 1981, Long John Baldry in 1996, Jack White in 2012, and Willy Moon in 2013
- "That's Your Mistake", recorded by Otis Williams in 1955, covered by The Crew Cuts the next year
- "Lonesome Whistle Blues", recorded by Freddie King in 1961 and by Chicken Shack in 1968
- "It Hurts to Be in Love", co-written with Julius Dixson for Annie Laurie in 1957

== Artists ==
His songs (apart from those recordings listed above) have been sung by the following artists:

- Amos Milburn
- Hank Ballard
- Freddie King
- Ella Mae Morse
- Otis Williams and the Charms
- The Orioles
- James Brown
- Big Joe Turner
- Louis Jordan
- Pat Boone
- Wynonie Harris
- Hank Snow
- Johnny "Guitar" Watson
- Betty Everett
- Frankie Laine
- The Five Keys
- Albert King
- Bill Haley & His Comets
- Chicken Shack
- The Blasters
- Jack White
- The Honeydrippers
