= Teardrops from My Eyes =

Single by Ruth Brown
- Released: October 1950
- Recorded: September 1950
- Genre: Rhythm and blues
- Label: Atlantic
- Songwriter: Rudy Toombs
- Producers: Ahmet Ertegun, Herb Abramson

"Teardrops from My Eyes", written by Rudy Toombs, was the first upbeat major hit for Ruth Brown, establishing her as an important figure in rhythm and blues. Recorded for Atlantic Records in New York City in September 1950, and released in October, it was Billboard's number-one R&B hit for 11 non-consecutive weeks. It was Atlantic's first release on the new 45-rpm record format. The huge hit earned Brown the nickname "Miss Rhythm" and within a few months she became the acknowledged queen of R&B. "Teardrops from My Eyes" was her first of five number-one R&B hits. In 2026, the song was selected by the Library of Congress for preservation in the National Recording Registry for being “culturally, historically, or aesthetically significant.”

== Background ==
Before this hit single, Brown was thought of strictly as a torch singer. When Ruby Toombs showed her the song, Brown was initially reluctant to do it as it was so rhythmically different from the popular standards and ballads she was comfortable singing. The change of tempo, the backbeat of four/four, at first led her to dig in her heels. But Ahmet Ertegün, sensing the time was right, urged her to try the song. The song has a tenor solo by Budd Johnson.

Atlantic used a process that it repeated over the years, that is, turning an uptown singer funky. As with Brown, Ertegün's method was to introduce popular black musical artists to older and more powerful black musical modes.

== Important cover versions ==
- Louis Jordan
- Rex Allen
- June Hutton
- Louis Prima
- Wynonie Harris
- B. B. King
- Ray Charles
- Bill Haley and His Saddlemen – a country-western/early rockabilly version recorded for Atlantic soon after Brown's version, but not released until 2006
