= (Mama) He Treats Your Daughter Mean =

Single by Ruth Brown
- B-side: "R.B. Blues"
- Released: January 14, 1953
- Recorded: 1952
- Genre: R&B
- Length: 2:50
- Label: Atlantic
- Songwriter(s): Johnny Wallace; Herbert J. Lance

Ruth Brown singles chronology
"Good for Nothin' Joe" (1952)	"(Mama) He Treats Your Daughter Mean" (1953)	"Wild, Wild Young Men" (1953)

"(Mama) He Treats Your Daughter Mean" is a song written by Johnny Wallace as well as Herbert J. Lance and recorded by Ruth Brown in 1952. It was Brown's third number-one record on the US Billboard R&B chart and her first pop chart hit. Brown re-recorded the song in 1962 when it made number 99 on the US pop chart.

== Background ==
According to Atlantic Records producer Herb Abramson, Lance wrote the song with his friend Wallace (brother of boxer Coley Wallace) after the pair heard a blues singer on the streets of Atlanta, Georgia, singing a mournful tune that featured the title of their song in its lyrics. What they heard may have been "One Dime Blues", which was recorded by Blind Lemon Jefferson in the 1920s and by Blind Willie McTell as "Last Dime Blues" in the late 1940s. The song's lyrics included the line "Mama, don't treat your daughter mean". According to Ruth Brown, the lyrics originated from a black church spiritual. Brown initially disliked the song but was persuaded by Lance and Wallace to record it in December 1952, after Abramson increased the tempo.

== Other versions ==
The song was subsequently recorded by many others, including:

- Anita Wood (1960)
- Sarah Vaughan (1962)
- Delaney & Bonnie (1970)
- Koko Taylor (1975)
- Susan Tedeschi (1998).
