= 5-10-15 Hours =

1952 single by Ruth Brown

Single by Ruth Brown
- B-side: "Be Anything (But Be Mine)"
- Released: March 1952
- Recorded: February 13, 1952
- Studio: Atlantic, New York
- Genre: R&B
- Length: 2:59
- Label: Atlantic
- Songwriter: Rudy Toombs
- Producers: Ahmet Ertegun; Herb Abramson

Ruth Brown singles chronology
"Shine On (Big Bright Moon, Shine On)" (1951)	"5-10-15 Hours" (1952)	"Daddy" (1952)

"5-10-15 Hours" is a rhythm-and-blues song written by Rudy Toombs in 1952 for Ruth Brown and was one of several number-one R&B hits he wrote for her. When Brown was inducted into the Rock and Roll Hall of Fame, her induction said that "her best work was to be found on such red-hot mid-Fifties R&B sides as '5-10-15 Hours'".

== Background ==
Her recording is smooth, sophisticated blues shouting at its best, has a touch of suppleness more characteristic of the vocal qualities of popular singers than of the blues. The recording features a tenor sax solo by Willis Jackson.

According to Brown, Toombs originally titled the song "5-10-15 Minutes (Of Your Love)", "until Herb [Abramson] coolly informed him that 'minutes' was no longer enough now that we were in the era of Billy Ward and the Dominoes' 'Sixty-Minute Man'. Presto, it became '5-10-15 Hours (Of Your Love)'".

The reviewer for Cash Box wrote, "[a] real low down jump tune is belted out by Ruth Brown as she gives a solid set of lyrics a zestful send-off. The upper lid, titled, “5-10-15 Hours,” is a pretty thing that is treated to a dramatic arrangement. Ruth Brown’s dynamic chanting receives solid support from the ork, which features a muted trumpet in the backing. The result is an exciting etching that should make merry in the jukes".

== Personnel ==
- Ruth Brown – vocals
- Vann "Piano Man" Walls – piano
- Willis Jackson – tenor saxophone
- Connie Kay – drums
- trumpet, saxophone, guitar and bass unknown

== Charts ==
Chart (1952)	Peak position
US Bestselling Retail Rhythm & Blues Records (Billboard)	1
US Most Played Juke Box Rhythm & Blues Records (Billboard)	1
