= Ruth Brown =

American singer-songwriter (1928–2006)

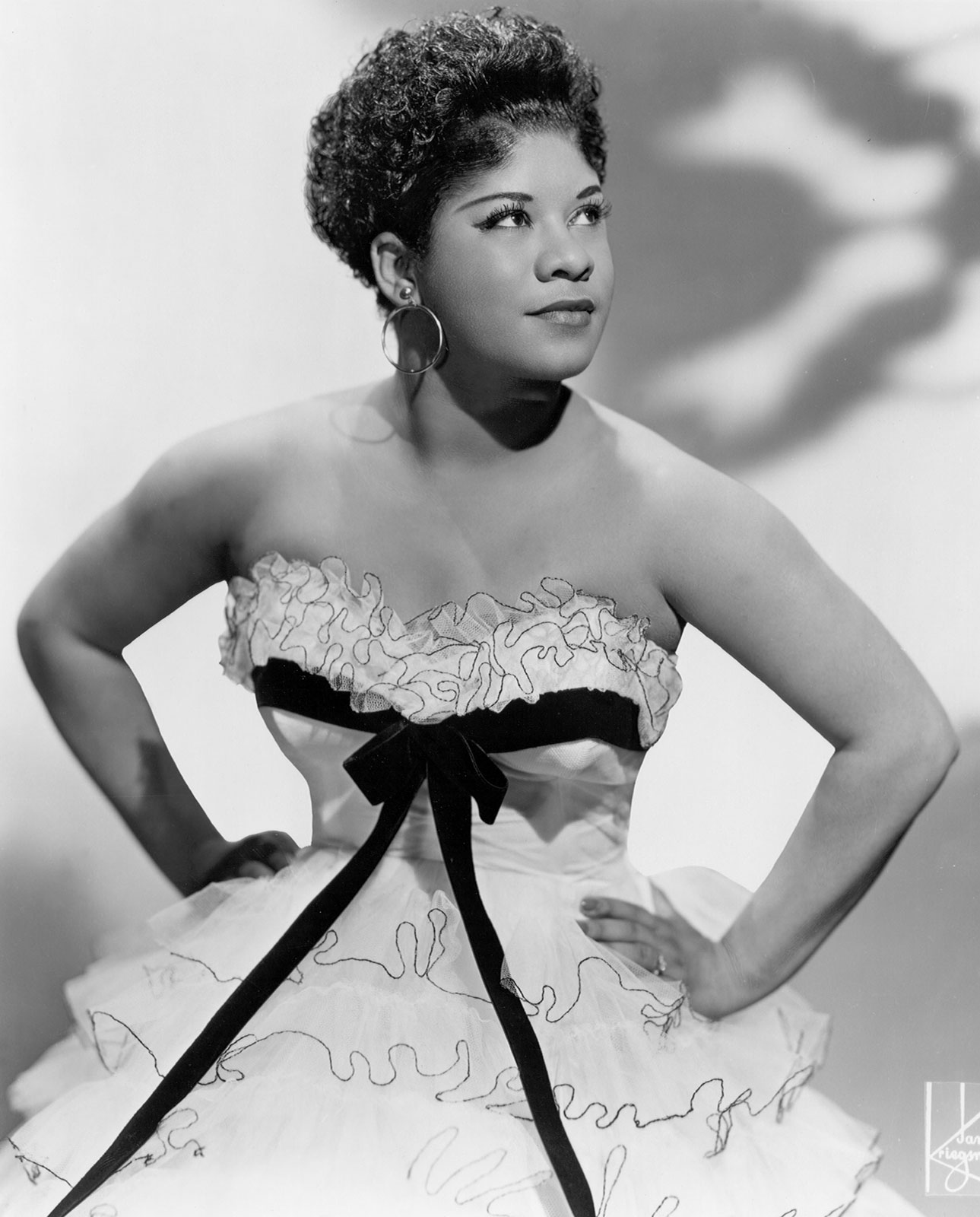
- Brown in 1955

Background information
- Born: Ruth Alston Weston; January 12, 1928; Portsmouth, Virginia, U.S.
- Died: November 17, 2006 (aged 78) Henderson, Nevada, U.S.
- Genres: R&B; soul; jazz; blues; doo-wop; gospel; funk
- Occupations: Actress; singer-songwriter
- Instruments: Vocals; piano; keyboards
- Years active: 1949–2006
- Labels: Atlantic; Philips; Fantasy

Ruth Alston Brown (née Weston; January 12, 1928 – November 17, 2006) was an American singer-songwriter and actress, sometimes referred to as the "Queen of R&B". She was noted for bringing a pop music style to R&B music in a series of hit songs for Atlantic Records in the 1950s, such as "So Long", "Teardrops from My Eyes" and "(Mama) He Treats Your Daughter Mean". For these contributions, Atlantic became known as "the house that Ruth built" (alluding to the popular nickname for the old Yankee Stadium). Brown was a 1993 inductee into the Rock and Roll Hall of Fame.

Following a resurgence that began in the mid-1970s and peaked in the 1980s, Brown used her influence to press for musicians' rights regarding royalties and contracts; these efforts led to the founding of the Rhythm and Blues Foundation. Her performances in the Broadway musical Black and Blue earned Brown a Tony Award, and the original cast recording won a Grammy Award. Brown was a recipient of the Grammy Lifetime Achievement Award in 2016. In 2017, Brown was inducted into National Rhythm & Blues Hall of Fame. In 2023, Rolling Stone ranked Brown at number 146 on its list of the 200 Greatest Singers of All Time.

Brown was an "aunt" (a close family friend) of emcee Rakim.

== Early life ==
Born in Portsmouth, Virginia, Brown was the eldest of seven siblings. She attended I. C. Norcom High School. Brown's father was a dockhand. He also directed the local church choir at Emmanuel African Methodist Episcopal Church, but the young Ruth showed more interest in singing at USO shows and nightclubs, rebelling against her father. She was inspired by Sarah Vaughan, Billie Holiday, and Dinah Washington.

In 1945, aged 17, Brown ran away from her home in Portsmouth along with the trumpeter Jimmy Brown, whom she soon married, to sing in bars and clubs. She then spent a month with Lucky Millinder's orchestra.

== Early career ==
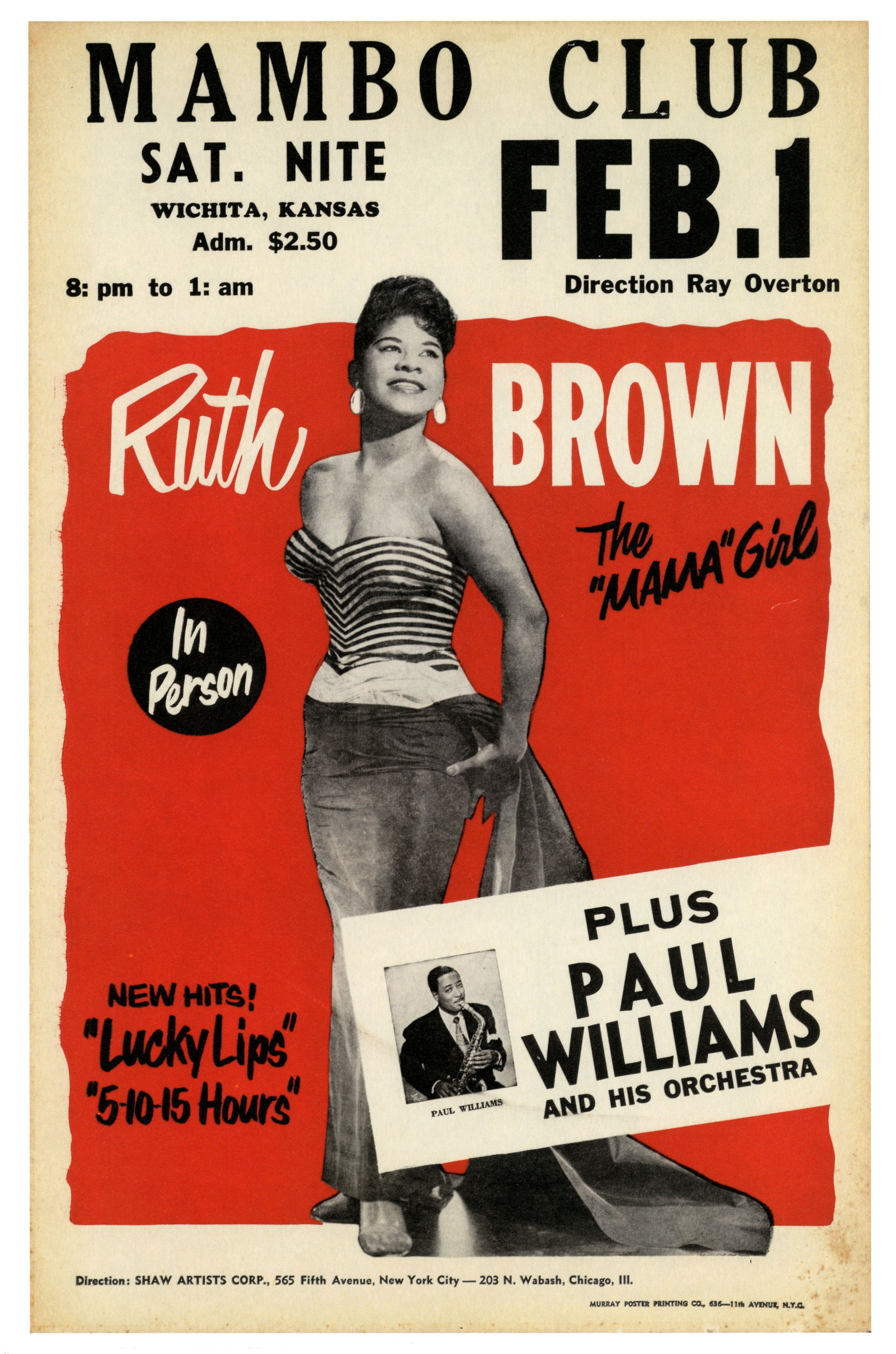
Ruth Brown performs at the Mambo Club in Wichita, Kansas, 1957

Blanche Calloway, Cab Calloway's sister, also a bandleader, arranged a gig for Brown at the Crystal Caverns, a nightclub in Washington, D.C., and soon became her manager. Willis Conover, the future Voice of America disc jockey, caught her act with Duke Ellington and recommended her to Atlantic Records bosses Ahmet Ertegun and Herb Abramson. Brown was unable to audition as planned because of a car crash, which resulted in a nine-month stay in the hospital. She signed with Atlantic Records from her hospital bed.

In 1948, Ertegun and Abramson drove from New York City to Washington, D.C., to hear Brown sing. Her repertoire was mostly popular ballads, but Ertegun convinced her to switch to rhythm and blues.

In her first audition, in 1949, she sang "So Long," which became a hit. This was followed by "Teardrops from My Eyes" in 1950. Written by Rudy Toombs, it was the first upbeat major hit for Brown. Recorded for Atlantic Records in New York City in September 1950 and released in October, it was Billboard's R&B number one for 11 weeks. The hit earned her the nickname "Miss Rhythm", and within a few months, she became the acknowledged queen of R&B.

She followed up this hit with "I'll Wait for You" (1951), "I Know" (1951), "5-10-15 Hours" (1953), "(Mama) He Treats Your Daughter Mean" (1953), "Oh What a Dream" (1954), "Mambo Baby" (1954), and "Don't Deceive Me" (1960), some of which were credited to Ruth Brown and the Rhythm Makers. Between 1949 and 1955, her records stayed on the R&B chart for a total of 149 weeks; she would go on to score 21 Top 10 hits all together, including five that landed at number one. Brown ranked No. 1 on The Billboard 1954 Disk Jockey Poll for Favorite R&B Artists.

Brown played many racially segregated dances in the southern states, where she toured extensively and was immensely popular. She claimed that a writer had once summed up her popularity by saying, "In the South, Ruth Brown is better known than Coca-Cola."

Brown performed at the famed tenth Cavalcade of Jazz concert held at Wrigley Field in Los Angeles, which was produced by Leon Hefflin, Sr. on June 20, 1954. She performed along with The Flairs, Count Basie and his Orchestra, Lamp Lighters, Louis Jordan and His Tympany Five, Christine Kittrell, and Perez Prado and his Orchestra.

Her first pop hit came with "Lucky Lips", a song written by Jerry Leiber and Mike Stoller and recorded in 1957. The single reached number 6 on the R&B chart and number 25 on the U.S. pop chart. The 1958 follow-up was "This Little Girl's Gone Rockin'", written by Bobby Darin and Mann Curtis. It reached number 7 on the R&B chart and number 24 on the pop chart.

She had further hits with "I Don't Know" in 1959 and "Don't Deceive Me" in 1960, which were more successful on the R&B chart than on the pop chart. In 1965 she appeared as a guest on TV Gospel Time. During the 1960s, Brown faded from public view and lived as a housewife and mother.

== Later career ==
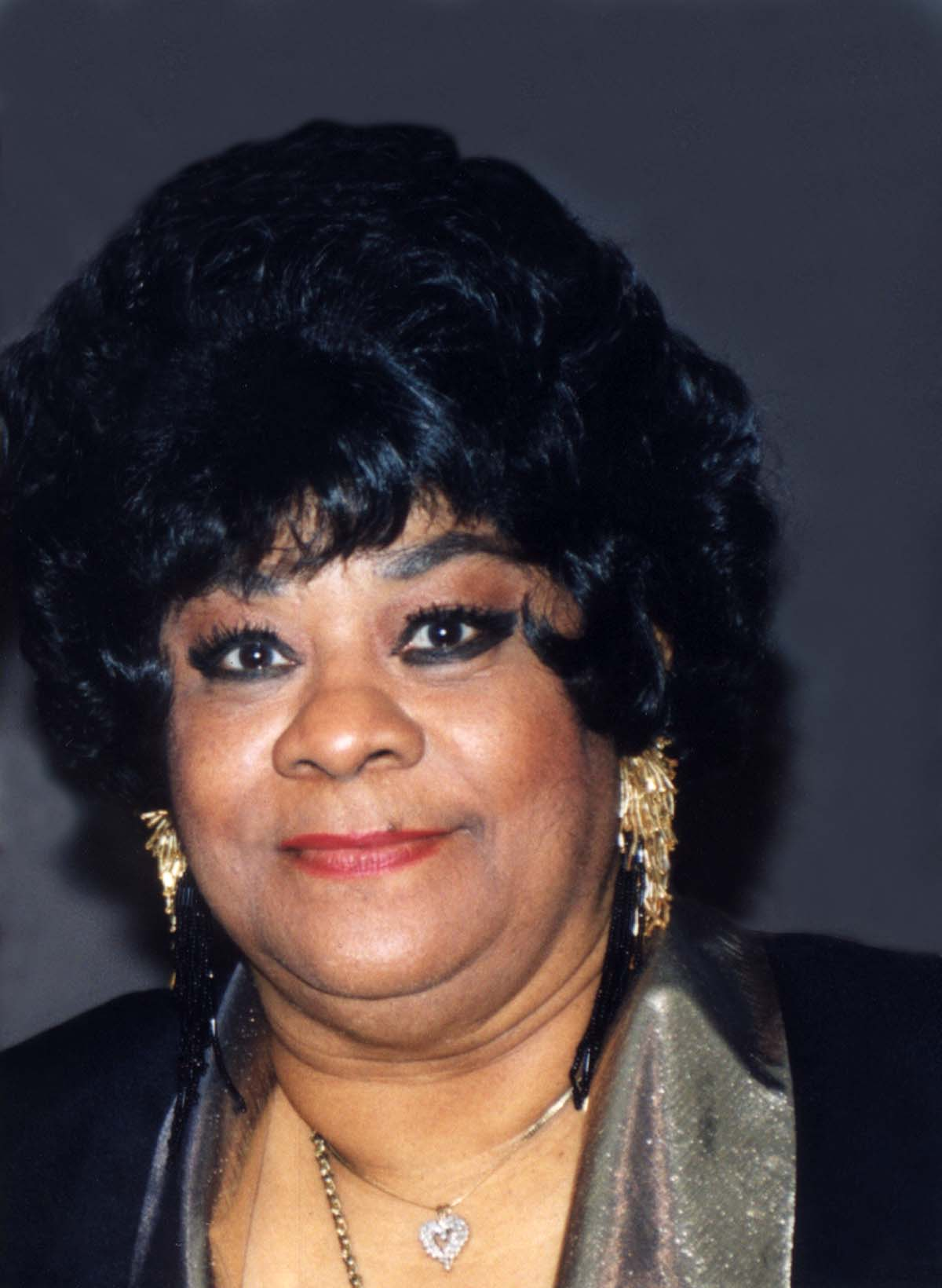
Brown in 1996

She returned to music in 1975 at the urging of the comedian Redd Foxx, followed by a series of comedic acting jobs. This launched her career in TV, film, and stage. She had a recurring role during the second season of the sitcom Hello, Larry as the neighbor, Leona Wilson. She starred as Motormouth Maybelle Stubbs, a friendly and strong-willed record promoter and mother of Seaweed and L'il Inez, in the John Waters cult classic film Hairspray. On Broadway, she starred in productions of Amen Corner and Black and Blue. The latter earned her a Tony Award for Best Actress in a Musical in 1989. The New York Times theater critic Frank Rich wrote, "Ruth Brown, the rhythm-and-blues chanteuse, applies sarcastic varnish and two-a-day burlesque timing to the ribald Andy Razaf lyrics of 'If I Can't Sell It, I'll Keep Sittin' on It.'"

Brown's fight for musicians' rights and royalties in 1987 led to the founding of the Rhythm and Blues Foundation in 1988. She was one of the first recipients of the Pioneer Award in 1989. In 1989, she released an album, "Blues and Broadway," which won a Grammy for best jazz vocal performance, female. She was inducted into the Oklahoma Jazz Hall of Fame in 1992 and the Rock and Roll Hall of Fame in 1993.

Brown recorded and sang with the rhythm-and-blues singer Charles Brown. She also toured with Bonnie Raitt in the late 1990s. Her 1995 autobiography, Miss Rhythm, won the Gleason Award for music journalism. She also appeared on Bonnie Raitt's 1995 live DVD Road Tested, singing "Never Make Your Move Too Soon". She was nominated for another Grammy in the Traditional Blues category for her 1997 album, R + B = Ruth Brown. In the 2000 television miniseries Little Richard, she was portrayed by singer Tressa Thomas.

She hosted the radio program Blues Stage, carried by more than 200 NPR affiliates, for six years, starting in 1989.

Brown was still touring at the age of 78. She had completed preproduction work on the John Sayles film, Honeydripper, which she did not live to finish. Still, her recording of "Things About Comin' My Way" was released posthumously on the soundtrack CD. Her last interview was in August 2006.

== Death ==
Brown died in a Las Vegas–area hospital on November 17, 2006, from complications following a heart attack and stroke she suffered after surgery in the previous month. She was 78 years old. A funeral was held on November 28. A memorial concert for her was held on January 22, 2007, at the Abyssinian Baptist Church in Harlem, New York.

Brown is buried at Roosevelt Memorial Park, Chesapeake City, Virginia.

== Accolades ==
Year	Award	Category	Work	Result	Ref.
1969	Grammy Award	Best Female R&B Vocal Performance	"Yesterday"	Nominated	
1989	Grammy Award	Best Jazz Vocal Performance, Female	Blues on Broadway	Won	
1989	Grammy Award	Best Traditional Blues Album	"If I Can't Sell It, I'll Keep Sittin' on It"	Nominated	
1989	Tony Award	Best Actress in a Musical	Black and Blue	Won	
1990	Grammy Award	Best Traditional Blues Album	"T'ain't Nobody's Bizness If I Do"	Nominated	
1997	Grammy Award	Best Traditional Blues Album	R + B = Ruth Brown	Nominated	
1999	Grammy Award	Best Traditional Blues Album	A Good Day for the Blues	Nominated	

She also received the following honors:

- 1989: Rhythm & Blues Foundation Pioneer Award
- 1992: Inducted into the Oklahoma Jazz Hall of Fame
- 1993: Inducted into the Rock & Roll Hall of Fame
- 1996: Ralph Gleason Award for Music Journalism
- 2013: Inducted into the Virginia Musical Museum's Virginia Music Hall of Fame
- 2016: Grammy Lifetime Achievement Award
- 2017: Inducted into National Rhythm & Blues Hall of Fame

== Discography ==
=== Studio albums ===
- Ruth Brown (Atlantic, 1957)
- Miss Rhythm (Atlantic, 1959)
- Late Date with Ruth Brown (Atlantic, 1959)
- Along Comes Ruth (Philips, 1962)
- Gospel Time (Philips, 1962)
- Ruth Brown '65 (Mainstream, 1965)
- Black Is Brown and Brown Is Beautiful (Skye, 1969)
- The Real Ruth Brown (Cobblestone/Buddah, 1972)
- Sugar Babe (President, 1976), re-issued in 1985 as Brown Sugar
- You Don't Know Me (Dobre, 1978)
- Blues on Broadway (Fantasy, 1989)
- Help a Good Girl Go Bad (MMS Classix, 1989)
- Brown, Black & Beautiful (SDEG/Ichiban, 1990)
- Fine and Mellow (Fantasy, 1991)
- The Songs of My Life (Fantasy, 1993)
- R + B = Ruth Brown (Bullseye Blues, 1997)
- A Good Day for the Blues (Bullseye Blues, 1999)

=== Live albums ===
- The Soul Survives (Flair, 1982)
- Takin' Care of Business (Stockholm, 1983)
- Have a Good Time (Fantasy, 1988)
- Live in London (Jazz House, 1995)

=== Compilations ===
- The Best of Ruth Brown (Atlantic, 1962)
- Miss Rhythm (Greatest Hits and More) (Atlantic, 1989)

=== As guest ===
With Thad Jones and Mel Lewis

- The Big Band Sound of Thad Jones/Mel Lewis Featuring Miss Ruth Brown (Solid State, 1968)

With Benny Carter

- Benny Carter Songbook (MusicMasters, 1996)
- Benny Carter Songbook Volume II (MusicMasters, 1997)

=== Singles ===
Year	Titles (A-side, B-side) Both sides from same album except where indicated	Peak chart positions		Album
Year	Titles (A-side, B-side) Both sides from same album except where indicated	US R&B	US Pop	Album
1949	"So Long" b/w "It's Raining" (non-album track)	4	—	Rock & Roll
1949	"I'll Get Along Somehow" (Part 1) b/w Part 2	—	—	Non-album tracks
1950	"Happiness Is a Thing Called Joe" b/w "Love Me Baby"	—	—	Non-album tracks
1950	"Why" b/w "(I'll Come Back) Someday"	—	—	Non-album tracks
1950	"Sentimental Journey" b/w "I Can Dream Can't I" (from Late Date with Ruth Brown)	—	—	Rock & Roll
1950	The two preceding singles are with the Delta Rhythm Boys.			
1950	"Where Can I Go" b/w "Dear Little Boy of Mine"	—	—	Non-album tracks
1950	"Teardrops from My Eyes" b/w "Am I Making the Same Mistake Again" (non-album track)	1	—	Rock & Roll
1951	"I'll Wait for You" b/w "Standing on the Corner"	3	—	Non-album tracks
1951	"I Know" b/w "Don't Want Nobody (If I Can't Have You)"	7	—	Non-album tracks
1951	"Shine On (Big Bright Moon, Shine On)" b/w "Without My Love" (non-album track)	—	—	The Best of Ruth Brown
1952	"5-10-15 Hours" b/w "Be Anything (But Be Mine)" (non-album track)	1	—	Rock & Roll
1952	"Daddy Daddy" b/w "Have a Good Time" (non-album track)	3	—	Rock & Roll
1952	"Good for Nothin' Joe" b/w "Three Letters"	—	—	Non-album tracks
1953	"(Mama) He Treats Your Daughter Mean" b/w "R. B. Blues" (non-album track)	1	23	Rock & Roll
1953	"Wild Wild Young Men" /	3	—	Rock & Roll
1953	"Mend Your Ways"	7	—	Non-album tracks
1953	"The Tears Keep Tumbling Down" b/w "I Would If I Could"	—	—	Non-album tracks
1954	"Love Contest" b/w "If You Don't Want Me"	—	—	Non-album tracks
1954	"Sentimental Journey" b/w "It's All in Your Mind" (both sides with the Delta Rhythm Boys)	—	—	Non-album tracks
1954	"Hello Little Boy" b/w "If I Had Any Sense"	—	—	Non-album tracks
1954	"Oh What a Dream" b/w "Please Don't Freeze" (from The Best of Ruth Brown)	1	—	Rock & Roll
1954	"Mambo Baby" b/w "Somebody Touched Me" (from Miss Rhythm)	1	—	Rock & Roll
1955	"Bye Bye Young Men" b/w "Ever Since My Baby's Been Gone" (non-album track)	13	—	The Best of Ruth Brown
1955	"As Long As I'm Moving" /	4	—	Rock & Roll
1955	"I Can See Everybody's Baby"	7	—	Miss Rhythm
1955	The preceding five singles are with the Rhythmakers (the Drifters).			
1955	"It's Love Baby (24 Hours of the Day)" b/w "What'd I Say" (non-album track)	4	—	Rock & Roll
1955	"Love Has Joined Us Together" b/w "I Gotta Have You" (both sides with Clyde McPhatter)	8	—	Non-album tracks
1956	"I Want to Do More" b/w "Old Man River" (from Rock & Roll) (both sides with the Rhythmakers [the Drifters])	3	—	Non-album tracks
1956	"Sweet Baby of Mine" b/w "I'm Getting Right"	10	—	Non-album tracks
1956	"Mom Oh Mom" b/w "I Want to Be Loved"	—	—	Non-album tracks
1956	"I Still Love You" b/w "Smooth Operator"	—	—	Non-album tracks
1957	"Lucky Lips" b/w "My Heart Is Breaking Over You" (non-album track)	6	25	Rock & Roll
1957	"One More Time" b/w "When I Get You Baby"	—	—	Miss Rhythm
1957	"Show Me" b/w "I Hope We Meet (On the Road Someday)"	—	—	Miss Rhythm
1957	"A New Love" b/w "Look Me Up"	—	—	Non-album tracks
1958	"Just Too Much b/w "Book of Lies"	—	—	Miss Rhythm
1958	"This Little Girl's Gone Rockin'" /	7	24	Miss Rhythm
1958	"Why Me"	17	—	Miss Rhythm
1958	"(Mama) He Treats Your Daughter Mean" b/w "I'll Step Aside" (non-album track)	—	—	(these are re-makes)
1959	"5-10-15 Hours" b/w "Itty Bitty Girl" (non-album track)	—	—	(these are re-makes)
1959	"Jack O'Diamonds" b/w "I Can't Hear a Word You Say"	23	96	Miss Rhythm
1959	"I Don't Know" b/w "Papa Daddy" (non-album track)	5	64	The Best of Ruth Brown
1959	"Don't Deceive Me" b/w "I Burned Your Letter"	10	62	Non-album tracks
1959	"What I Wouldn't Give" b/w "The Door Is Still Open"	—	—	Non-album tracks
1960	"Taking Care of Business" b/w "Honey Boy" (non-album track)	—	—	The Best of Ruth Brown
1960	"Sure 'Nuff" b/w "Here He Comes"	—	—	Non-album tracks
1961	"Anyone But You" b/w "It Tears Me All to Pieces"	—	—	Non-album tracks
1961	"Walkin' and Talkin'" b/w "Hoopa-Loopa-Doopa" (shown as by "Venus")	—	—	Non-album tracks
1962	"Shake a Hand" b/w "Say It Again" (non-album track)	—	97	Along Comes Ruth
1962	"Mama, He Treats Your Daughter Mean" b/w "Hold My Hand" (non-album track)	—	99	Along Comes Ruth
1962	"He Tells Me with His Eyes" b/w "If You Don't Tell Nobody"	—	—	Non-album tracks
1963	"Secret Love" b/w "Time After Time"	—	—	Non-album tracks
1964	"What Happened to You" b/w "Yes Sir That's My Baby"	—	—	Non-album tracks
1964	"I Love Him and I Know It" b/w "Come a Little Closer"	—	—	Non-album tracks
1964	"Hurry On Down" b/w "On the Good Ship Lollipop"	—	—	Ruth Brown '65
1968	"You're a Stone Groovy Thing" b/w "Someday (I Know, I Know)	—	—	Non-album tracks
1969	"Yesterday" b/w "Try Me and See"	—	—	Black Is Brown and Brown Is Beautiful
1989	"If I Can't Sell It, I'll Keep Sittin' on It" b/w "Good Morning Heartache"	—	—	Blues on Broadway
