= Atlantic Records =

American record label

- Parent company: Warner Music Group
- Founded: October 1947; 79 years ago
- Founder: Ahmet Ertegun; Herb Abramson
- Genre: Various
- Country of origin: United States
- Location: New York City, U.S.
- Official website: atlanticrecords.com

Atlantic Recording Corporation is an American record label founded in October 1947 by Ahmet Ertegun and Herb Abramson. Over the course of its first two decades, starting from the release of its first recordings in January 1948, Atlantic earned a reputation as one of the most important American labels, specializing in jazz, R&B, and soul by Aretha Franklin, Ray Charles, Wilson Pickett, Sam and Dave, Ruth Brown and Otis Redding. Its position was greatly improved by its distribution deal with Stax. In 1967, Atlantic became a wholly owned subsidiary of Warner Bros.-Seven Arts, now the Warner Music Group, and expanded into rock and pop music with releases by Crosby, Stills, Nash & Young, Led Zeppelin, and Yes.

In 2004, Atlantic and its sister label Elektra were merged into Atlantic Music Group. Craig Kallman is the chairman of Atlantic. Ahmet Ertegun served as founding chairman until his death on December 14, 2006, at age 83.

== History ==
=== Founding and early history ===
In 1944, when their mother and sister returned to Turkey after the death of their father Munir Ertegun, Turkey's first ambassador to the U.S., brothers Nesuhi and Ahmet Ertegun remained in the United States. The brothers were fans of jazz and rhythm & blues, amassing a collection of over 15,000 78 rpm records. Ahmet stayed in Washington to undertake post-graduate music studies at Georgetown University, and immersed himself in the Washington music scene. He entered the record business, which was enjoying a resurgence after wartime restrictions on the shellac used in manufacture had been lifted. He convinced the family dentist, Vahdi Sabit, to invest $10,000 and hired Herb Abramson, a dentistry student.

Herb had worked as a part-time A&R manager/producer for Al Green at the jazz label National Records, signing Big Joe Turner and Billy Eckstine. He founded Jubilee in 1946 but had no interest in its most successful musicians. In September 1947, he sold his share in Jubilee to his partner, Jerry Blaine, and invested $2,500 in Atlantic.

Atlantic was incorporated in October 1947 and was run by Herb (president) and Ertegun (vice-president in charge of A&R, production, and promotion). Herb's wife Miriam Abramson ran the label's publishing company, Progressive Music. She did most office duties until 1949, when Atlantic hired its first employee, bookkeeper Francine Wakschal, who remained with the label for the next 49 years. Miriam gained a reputation for toughness. Staff engineer Tom Dowd recalled, "Tokyo Rose was the kindest name some people had for her" and Doc Pomus described her as "an extraordinarily vitriolic woman". When interviewed in 2009, she attributed her reputation to the company's chronic cash-flow shortage: "... most of the problems we had with artists were that they wanted advances, and that was very difficult for us ... we were undercapitalized for a long time". The label's office in the Ritz Hotel in Manhattan proved too expensive, so they moved to a room in the Hotel Jefferson. In the early fifties, Atlantic moved from the Hotel Jefferson to offices at 301 West 54th St and then to 356 West 56th St.

Atlantic's first recordings were issued in late January 1948 and included "That Old Black Magic" by Tiny Grimes and "The Spider" by Joe Morris. In its early years, Atlantic concentrated on modern jazz, although it released some country and western and spoken word recordings. Herb also produced "Magic Records", children's records with four grooves on each side. Each groove contained a different story, so the story played would be determined by the groove in which the stylus happened to land.

In late 1947, James Petrillo, head of the American Federation of Musicians, announced an indefinite ban on all recording activities by union musicians. This came into effect on January 1, 1948. The union action forced Atlantic to use almost all its capital to cut and stockpile enough recordings to last through the ban, which was expected to continue for at least a year.

Ertegun and Herb spent much of the late 1940s and early 1950s scouring nightclubs in search of talent. Ertegun composed songs under the alias "A. Nugetre", including Big Joe Turner's hit "Chains of Love", recording them in booths in Times Square, then giving them to an arranger or session musician. Early releases included music by Sidney Bechet, Barney Bigard, the Cardinals, the Clovers, Frank Culley, the Delta Rhythm Boys, Erroll Garner, Dizzy Gillespie, Tiny Grimes, Al Hibbler, Earl Hines, Johnny Hodges, Jackie & Roy, Lead Belly, Meade Lux Lewis, Professor Longhair, Shelly Manne, Howard McGhee, Mabel Mercer, James Moody, Joe Morris, Art Pepper, Django Reinhardt, Pete Rugolo, Pee Wee Russell, Bobby Short, Sylvia Syms, Billy Taylor, Sonny Terry, Big Joe Turner, Jimmy Yancey, Sarah Vaughan, Mal Waldron, and Mary Lou Williams.

=== First hits ===
In early 1949, a New Orleans distributor phoned Ertegun to obtain Stick McGhee's "Drinking Wine, Spo-Dee-O-Dee", which was unavailable due to the closing of McGhee's previous label, Harlem Records. Ertegun knew Stick's younger brother Brownie McGhee, with whom Stick happened to be staying, so he contacted the McGhee brothers and re-recorded the song. When released in February 1949, it became Atlantic's first hit, selling 400,000 copies, and reached No. 2 after spending almost six months on the Billboard R&B chart – although McGhee himself earned just $10 for the session. Atlantic recorded 187 songs in 1949, more than three times the amount from the previous two years, and received overtures for a manufacturing and distribution deal with Columbia, which would pay Atlantic a 3% royalty on every copy sold. Ertegun asked about artists' royalties, which he paid. This surprised Columbia executives, who did not, and the deal was scuttled.

On the recommendation of broadcaster Willis Conover, Ertegun and Herb visited Ruth Brown at the Crystal Caverns club in Washington and invited her to audition for Atlantic. She was injured in a car accident en route to New York City, but Atlantic supported her for nine months and then signed her. "So Long", her first record for the label, was recorded with Eddie Condon's band on May 25, 1949. The song reached No. 6 on the R&B chart. Brown recorded more than eighty songs for Atlantic, becoming its bestselling, most prolific musician of the period. Brown's success was so significant to Atlantic that the label became known colloquially as "The House That Ruth Built".

Joe Morris, one of the label's earliest signings, scored a hit with his October 1950 song "Anytime, Anyplace, Anywhere". It was the first Atlantic record issued in 45rpm format, which the company began pressing in January 1951. The Clovers' "Don't You Know I Love You" (composed by Ertegun) became the label's first R&B No. 1 in September 1951. A few weeks later, Brown's "Teardrops from My Eyes" became its first million-selling record. She hit No. 1 again in March–April 1952 with "5-10-15 Hours". "Daddy Daddy" reached No. 3 in September 1952, and "Mama, He Treats Your Daughter Mean" with Connie Kay on drums reached No. 1 in February and March 1953. After Brown left the label in 1961, her career declined, and she worked as a cleaner and bus driver to support her children. In the 1980s she sued Atlantic for unpaid royalties; although Atlantic, which prided itself on treating artists fairly, had stopped paying royalties to some musicians. Ertegun denied this was intentional. Brown received a voluntary payment of $20,000 and founded the Rhythm and Blues Foundation in 1988 with a donation of $1.5 million from Ertegun.

In 1952 Atlantic signed Ray Charles, whose hits included "I Got a Woman", "What'd I Say", and "Hallelujah I Love Her So". Later that year The Clovers' "One Mint Julep" reached No. 2. In 1953, after learning that singer Clyde McPhatter had been fired from Billy Ward and His Dominoes and was forming The Drifters, Ertegun signed the group. Their single "Money Honey" became the biggest R&B hit of the year. Their records created some controversy: the suggestive "Such A Night" was banned by radio station WXYZ in Detroit, Michigan, and "Honey Love" was banned in Memphis, Tennessee but both reached No. 1 on the Billboard R&B chart.

=== Tom Dowd ===
Recording engineer and producer Tom Dowd played a crucial role in Atlantic's success. He initially worked for Atlantic on a freelance basis, but within a few years he had been hired as the label's full-time staff engineer. His recordings for Atlantic and Stax influenced pop music.

Atlantic was one of the first independent labels to make recordings in stereo: Dowd used a portable stereo recorder which ran simultaneously with the studio's existing mono recorder. In 1953 (according to Billboard) Atlantic was the first label to issue commercial LPs recorded in the experimental stereo system called binaural recording. In this system, recordings were made using two microphones, spaced at approximately the distance between the human ears. Thd left and right channels were recorded as two separate, parallel grooves. Playing them back required a turntable with a special tone-arm fitted with dual needles; it was not until around 1958 that the single stylus microgroove system (in which the two stereo channels were cut into either side of a single groove) became the industry standard. By the late 1950s stereo LPs and turntables were being introduced. Atlantic's early stereo recordings included "Lover's Question" by Clyde McPhatter, "What Am I Living For" by Chuck Willis, "I Cried a Tear" by LaVern Baker, "Splish Splash" by Bobby Darin, "Yakety Yak" by the Coasters and "What'd I Say" by Ray Charles. Although these were primarily 45 rpm mono singles for much of the 1950s, Dowd stockpiled his "parallel" stereo takes for future release. In 1968 the label issued History of Rhythm and Blues, Volume 4 in stereo. Stereo versions of Ray Charles "What'd I Say" and "Night Time is the Right Time" were included on the Atlantic anthology The Birth of Soul: The Complete Atlantic Rhythm & Blues Recordings, 1952–1959.

Atlantic's New York studio was the first in America to install multitrack recording machines, developed by the Ampex company. Bobby Darin's "Splish, Splash" was the first song to be recorded on an 8-track recorder. It was not until the mid-1960s that multitrack recorders became the norm in English studios and EMI's Abbey Road Studios did not install 8-track facilities until 1968.

Atlantic entered the LP market early: its first was This Is My Beloved (March 1949), a 10-inch album of poetry by Walter Benton that was narrated by John Dall with music by Vernon Duke. In 1951, Atlantic was one of the first independent labels to press records in the 45 rpm single format. By 1956 the 45 had surpassed the 78 in sales for singles. In April of that year, Miriam (Abramson) Bienstock reported to Billboard that Atlantic was selling 75% of its singles as 45s. During the previous year, 78s had outsold 45s by a ratio of two to one.

=== Jerry Wexler ===
In February 1953, Herb Abramson was drafted into the U.S. Army. He moved to Germany, where he served in the Army Dental Corps, although he retained his post as president of Atlantic on full pay. Ertegun hired Billboard reporter Jerry Wexler in June 1953. Wexler is credited with coining the term "rhythm & blues" to replace "race music". He was appointed vice-president and purchased 13% of the company's stock. Wexler and Ertegun formed a close partnership which, in collaboration with Tom Dowd, produced thirty R&B hits.

Wexler's success for Atlantic was the result of going outside jazz to sign acts who combined jazz, blues, and rhythm and blues, such as Ray Charles, Joe Turner, and Aretha Franklin. Ertegun and Wexler realized many R&B recordings by black musicians were being covered by white performers, often with greater chart success. LaVern Baker had a No. 4 R&B hit with "Tweedlee Dee", but a rival version by Georgia Gibbs went to No. 2 on the pop chart. Big Joe Turner's April 1954 song "Shake, Rattle and Roll" was a No. 1 R&B hit, but it only reached No. 22 on the pop chart. Bill Haley & His Comets's version reached No. 7, selling over one million copies and becoming the bestselling song of the year for Decca. In July 1954, Wexler and Ertegun wrote a prescient article for Cash Box devoted to what they called "cat music"; the same month, Atlantic had its first major "crossover" hit on the Billboard pop chart when the "Sh-Boom" by The Chords reached No. 5 (although The Crew-Cuts' version went to No. 1). Atlantic missed an important signing in 1955 when Sun owner Sam Phillips sold Elvis Presley's recording contract in a bidding war between labels. Atlantic offered $25,000 which, Ertegun later noted, "was all the money we had then". But they were outbid by RCA's offer of $45,000. In 1990 Ertegun remarked, "The president of RCA at the time had been extensively quoted in Variety damning R&B music as immoral. He soon stopped when RCA signed Elvis Presley".

=== Nesuhi Ertegun ===
Ahmet's older brother Nesuhi was hired in January 1955. He had been living in Los Angeles for several years and had intermittent contact with his younger brother. But when Ahmet learned that Nesuhi had been offered a partnership in Atlantic's rival Imperial Records, he and Wexler convinced Nesuhi to join Atlantic instead. Nesuhi became head of artists and repertoire (A&R), led the label's jazz division, and built a roster that included Shorty Rogers, Jimmy Giuffre, Herbie Mann, Les McCann, Charles Mingus, and John Coltrane. By 1958 Atlantic was America's second-largest independent jazz label.

Nesuhi was also in charge of LP production. He was credited with improving the production, packaging, and originality of Atlantic's LPs. He deleted the old '100' and '400' series of 10-inch albums and the earlier 12-inch albums in Atlantic's catalog, starting the '1200' series, which sold for $4.98, with Shorty Rogers' The Swingin' Mr Rogers. In 1956 he started the '8000' popular series (selling for $3.98) for the label's few R&B albums, reserving the 1200 series for jazz. Joel Dorn became Nesuhi's assistant after his successful production of Hubert Laws' album The Laws of Jazz.

=== Herb Abramson departs ===
When Herb returned from military service in 1955, he realized that he had been replaced by Wexler as Ahmet's partner. Herb did not get along with either Wexler or Nesuhi Ertegun, and he had returned from military service with a German girlfriend, which precipitated his divorce from Miriam, a minor stockholder and Atlantic's business and publishing manager.

By 1958, relations between Herb and his partners had broken down. In December 1958 a $300,000 buy-out was arranged. His stock was split between Nesuhi Ertegun and Herb's ex-wife Miriam, who had in the meantime remarried to music publisher Freddy Bienstock (later the owner of the Carlin Music / Chappell Music publishing empire). Herb's departure opened the way for Ahmet Ertegun to take over as president of the label. The roles of the other executives with Herb's departure were Wexler as executive vice-president and general manager, Ertegun as executive vice-president in charge of the LP department and Miriam Bienstock as vice-president and also president of Atlantic's music publishing arm Progressive Music. Wexler was also executive vice-president of Progressive, and the Ertegun brothers were vice-presidents.

=== Expansion ===
Atlantic played a major role in popularizing the genre that Jerry Wexler dubbed rhythm & blues, and it profited handsomely. The market for these records exploded during late 1953 and early 1954 as R&B hits crossed over to the mainstream (i.e. white) audience. In its tenth anniversary feature on Atlantic, Billboard noted, "... a very big R&B record might achieve 250,000 sales, but from this point on (1953–54), the industry began to see million sellers, one after the other, in the R&B field". Billboard said Atlantic's "fresh sound" and the quality of its recordings, arrangements, and musicians was a great advance from standard R&B records. For five years Atlantic "dominated the rhythm and blues chart with its roster of powerhouse artists".

Beginning in 1954, Atlantic created or acquired several subsidiary labels, the first being Cat Records. By the mid-1950s, Atlantic had an informal agreement with the French label Barclay, and the two companies regularly exchanged titles, usually jazz recordings. Atlantic also began to get recordings distributed in the United Kingdom, first through EMI on a 'one-off' basis. But in September 1955 Miriam Abramson traveled to the UK and signed a distribution deal with Decca. Miriam recalled, "I would deal with people there who were not really comfortable with women in business, so...we would do business very quickly and get it over with".

A subsidiary label, Atco, was established in 1955 to keep Herb involved. After a slow start, Atco had considerable success with Bobby Darin. His early releases were unsuccessful, and Herb planned to drop him. But when Ertegun offered him another chance, the result was "Splish Splash", which Darin had written in 12 minutes. The song sold 100,000 copies in the first month and became a million-seller. "Queen of the Hop" made the Top 10 on both the US pop and R&B charts and charted in the UK. "Dream Lover" reached No. 2 in the US and No. 1 in the UK and became a multi-million seller. "Mack the Knife" (1959) went to No. 1 in both the US and the UK, sold over 2 million copies, and won the 1960 Grammy Award for Record of the Year. "Beyond the Sea" became Darin's fourth consecutive Top 10 hit in the US and UK. He signed with Capitol and moved for Hollywood to attempt a movie career, but hits such as "You Must Have Been a Beautiful Baby" and "Things" continued to benefit Atco through 1962. Darin returned to Atlantic in 1965. In 1965, Atlantic formed a budget label called Clarion Records. 21 albums were released simultaneously in 1965, all of them shown on the back cover of their releases. No further albums were issued as the label lasted less than a year.

=== Leiber and Stoller ===
Atlantic Records logo from its inception in 1947 to 1966 (it was still used on 7" single releases), used again from 1979 to 1981 and 2004 to 2015

Jerry Leiber and Mike Stoller wrote "Smokey Joe's Cafe", which became a hit for The Robins. Their label Spark was bought by Atlantic, and they were hired as America's first independent record producers, free to produce for other labels. Two members of The Robins formed The Coasters and recorded hits for Atlantic, such as "Down in Mexico" and "Young Blood". "Yakety Yak" became Atlantic's first No. 1 pop hit. Leiber and Stoller also wrote the hit "Ruby Baby" for The Drifters.

Record producer Phil Spector moved to New York to work with Leiber and Stoller. He learned his trade at Trey Records, a label in California owned by Lester Sill and Lee Hazlewood and distributed by Atlantic. Sill recommended Spector to Leiber and Stoller, who assigned him to produce "Corrine, Corrina" by Ray Peterson and "Pretty Little Angel Eyes" by Curtis Lee. Both became hits, and Atlantic hired him as a staff producer. Ahmet Ertegun liked him, but Leiber said, "He wasn't likable. He was funny, he was amusing—but he wasn't nice". Wexler disliked him. Miriam Bienstock called him "a pain in the neck". When Spector criticized Bobby Darin's songwriting, Darin had him thrown out of the house.

Atlantic tolerated Spector, but with diminishing returns. He produced "Twist and Shout" for The Top Notes, and it flopped. Songwriter Bert Berns hated Spector's arrangement and thought it ruined the song, so Berns re-recorded it with The Isley Brothers and it became a hit. During his short time at Atlantic, Spector produced music for LaVern Baker, Ruth Brown, Jean DuShon, and Billy Storm. In 1961, he left the label, returned to Los Angeles, and founded Philles Records with Lester Sill. Spector became one of the most successful record producers of the 1960s.

Although Leiber and Stoller wrote many popular songs for Atlantic, their relationship with the label was deteriorating in 1962. The breaking point came when they asked for a producer's royalty. It was granted informally, but their accountant insisted on a written contract and an audit of Atlantic's accounts. The audit revealed Leiber and Stoller had been underpaid by $18,000. Although Leiber considered dropping the matter, Stoller pressed Atlantic for payment. Wexler replied that the payment would mean the end of their relationship with the label. Leiber and Stoller backed down, but the relationship ended anyway. Their assignment to work on The Drifter's next recording was given to Phil Spector.

Leiber and Stoller worked briefly for United Artists, then started Red Bird with George Goldner. They had hits with "Chapel of Love" by The Dixie Cups and "Leader of the Pack" by The Shangri-Las, but Red Bird's finances were precarious. In 1964 they approached Jerry Wexler and proposed a merger with Atlantic. When interviewed in 1990 for Ertegun's biography, Wexler declined to discuss the matter, but Ertegun claimed these negotiations were a plan to buy him out. In September 1964, the Ertegun brothers and Wexler were in the process of buying out the company's other two shareholders, Sabit and Bienstock, and it was proposed that Leiber and Stoller buy Sabit's shares. Leiber, Stoller, Goldner, and Wexler suggested their plan to Ertegun at a lunch meeting at the Plaza Hotel in New York. Leiber and Stoller told Ertegun they had no intention of buying him out, but Ertegun was aggravated by Goldner's attitude and was convinced Wexler was conspiring with them. Wexler told Ertegun if he refused, the deal would be done without him. But the Ertegun brothers held the majority of stock while Wexler controlled about 20 percent. Ertegun started lifelong grudges against Leiber and Stoller, and his relationship with Wexler was damaged.

=== Stax ===
Atlantic was doing so well in early 1959 that some scheduled releases were held back. The company enjoyed two successive months of gross sales of over $1 million that summer, thanks to hits by The Coasters, The Drifters, LaVern Baker, Ray Charles, Bobby Darin, and Clyde McPhatter. Months later the company was reeling from the successive loss of its two biggest artists, Bobby Darin and Ray Charles, who together accounted for one-third of sales. Darin moved to Los Angeles and signed with Capitol. Charles signed a contract with ABC-Paramount that included higher royalties, a production deal, profit-sharing, and eventual ownership of his master tapes. "I thought we were going to die", Wexler recalled. In 1990 he and Ertegun disputed the content of Charles's contract, which caused a rift. Ertegun remained friendly with Bobby Darin, who returned to Atlantic in 1966. Ray Charles returned to Atlantic in 1977.

In 1960, Atlantic's Memphis distributor Buster Williams contacted Wexler and told him he was pressing large quantities of "Cause I Love You", a duet between Carla Thomas and her father Rufus which was released by the small label Satellite. Wexler contacted the co-owner of Satellite, Jim Stewart, who agreed to lease the record to Atlantic for $1000 plus a small royalty—the first money the label had ever made. The deal included a $5000 payment against a five-year option on all other records. Satellite was renamed Stax after the owners, Stewart and Axton. The deal marked the start of a successful eight-year association between the two labels, giving Stax access to Atlantic's promotions and distribution. Wexler recalled, "We didn't pay for the masters...Jim paid for the masters and then he would send us a finished tape and we would put it out. Our costs began at the production level—the pressing, and distribution, and promotion, and advertising".

The deal to distribute Satellite's "Last Night" by The Mar-Keys on the Satellite label marked the first time Atlantic began marketing outside tracks on a non-Atlantic label.

Atlantic began pressing and distributing Stax records. Wexler sent Tom Dowd to upgrade Stax's recording equipment and facilities. Wexler was impressed by the cooperative atmosphere at the Stax studios and by its racially integrated house band, which he called "an unthinkably great band". He brought Atlantic musicians to Memphis to record. Stewart and Wexler hired Al Bell, a disk jockey at a radio station in Washington D.C., to take over promotion of Stax releases. Bell was the first African-American partner in the label.

An after-hours jam by members of the Stax house band resulted in "Green Onions". The single was issued in August 1962 and became the biggest instrumental hit of the year, reaching No. 1 on the R&B chart and No. 3 on the pop chart, selling over one million copies. Over the next five years Stax and its subsidiary Volt provided Atlantic with many hits, such as "Respect" by Otis Redding, "Knock on Wood" by Eddie Floyd, "Hold On, I'm Comin'" by Sam and Dave, and "Mustang Sally" by Wilson Pickett.

=== Soul years ===
Aretha Franklin signed with Atlantic in 1966 after her contract with Columbia expired. Columbia tried to market her as a jazz singer. Jerry Wexler said, "we're gonna put her back in church". She rose to fame quickly and was called the Queen of Soul. Wexler oversaw production himself at Fame Studios in Muscle Shoals, Alabama. The result was seven consecutive singles that made both the US Pop and Soul Top 10: "I Never Loved a Man (The Way I Love You)" (Soul No. 1, Pop No. 9), "Respect" (Soul and Pop No. 1), "Baby, I Love You" (Soul No. 1, Pop No. 4), "(You Make Me Feel Like) A Natural Woman" (Soul No. 2, Pop No. 8), "Chain of Fools" (Soul No. 1, Pop No. 2), "Since You've Been Gone" (Soul No. 1, Pop No. 5), and "Think" (Soul No. 1, Pop No. 7).

In late 1961, singer Solomon Burke arrived at Jerry Wexler's office unannounced. Wexler was a fan of Burke's and had long wanted to sign him, so when Burke told Wexler his contract with his former label had expired Wexler replied: "You're home. I'm signing you today". The first song Wexler produced with Burke was "Just Out of Reach", which became a big hit in September 1961. The soul/country & western crossover predated Ray Charles' similar venture by more than 6 months. Burke became a consistent big seller through the mid-1960s and scored hits on Atlantic into 1968. In 1962 folk music was booming and the label came very close to signing Peter, Paul & Mary. Wexler and Ertegun pursued them vigorously, but the deal fell through at the last minute. They later discovered music publisher Artie Mogull had introduced their manager Albert Grossman to Warner Bros. executive Herman Starr, who had made the trio an irresistible offer that gave them complete creative control over the recording and packaging of their music.

The mid-1960s British Invasion led Atlantic to change its British distributor. Decca had refused access to its British acts, who usually appeared in the US on the London subsidiary. In 1966, Atlantic signed a licensing deal with Polydor which included the band Cream, whose debut album was released by Atco in 1966. In 1967, the group traveled to Atlantic's studio in New York City to record Disraeli Gears with Tom Dowd; it became a Top 5 LP in both the US and the UK, with the single "Sunshine of Your Love" reaching No. 5 on the Billboard Hot 100. Wexler dismissed developments in pop music, dubbing the musicians "the rockoids". However, Atlantic profited from moving into rock music in the 1970s when it signed Bad Company, Led Zeppelin, and Yes.

=== Acquisition by Warner Bros.-Seven Arts ===
Atlantic logo used from 1966 to 2004, and from 2015 to 2024

Despite the huge success Atlantic was enjoying with its own artists and through its deal with Stax, by 1967, Jerry Wexler was seriously concerned about the disintegration of the old order of independent record companies; fearing for the label's future, he began agitating for it to be sold to a larger company. Label President Ahmet Ertegun still had no desire to sell, but the balance of power had changed since the abortive takeover attempt of 1962; Atlantic's original investor Dr Vahdi Sabit and minority stockholder Miriam Bienstock had both been bought out in September 1964 and the other remaining partner, Nesuhi Ertegun, was eventually convinced to side with Wexler. Since they jointly held more stock, Ahmet was obliged to agree to the sale.

In October 1967, Atlantic was sold to Warner Bros.-Seven Arts for US$17.5 million, although all the partners later agreed that it was a poor deal that greatly undervalued Atlantic's true worth. Initially, Atlantic and Atco operated entirely separately from the group's other labels, Warner Bros. Records and Reprise Records, and management did not interfere with the music division, since their ailing movie division was losing money, while the Warner recording division was booming. By mid-1968 Warner's recording and publishing interests were generating 74% of the group's total profits.

The sale of Atlantic Records activated a clause in the distribution agreement with Stax Records calling for renegotiation of the distribution deal and at this point, the Stax partners discovered that the deal gave Atlantic ownership of all the Stax recordings Atlantic distributed. The new Warner owners refused to relinquish ownership of the Stax masters, so the distribution deal ended in May 1968. Atlantic continues to hold the rights to Stax recordings it distributed in the 1960s.

In the wake of the takeover, Jerry Wexler's influence in the company rapidly diminished; by his own admission, he and Ertegun had run Atlantic as "utmost despots" but in the new corporate structure, he found himself unwilling to accept the delegation of responsibility that his executive role dictated. He was also alienated from the "rockoid" white acts that were quickly becoming the label's most profitable commodities and dispirited by the rapidly waning fortunes of the black acts he had championed, such as Ben E. King and Solomon Burke. Wexler ultimately decided to leave New York and move to Florida. Following his departure, Ertegun—who had previously taken little interest in Atlantic's business affairs—took decisive control of the label and quickly became a major force in the expanding Warner music group.

During 1968, Atlantic established a new subsidiary label, Cotillion Records. The label was originally formed as an outlet for blues and deep Southern soul. Its first single, Otis Clay's version of "She's About A Mover", was an R&B hit. Cotillion's catalog quickly expanded to include progressive rock, folk-rock, gospel, jazz and comedy. In 1976, the label started focusing on disco and R&B. Among its acts were the post-Curtis Mayfield Impressions, Slave, Brook Benton, Jean Knight, Mass Production, Sister Sledge, The Velvet Underground, Stacy Lattisaw, Lou Donaldson, Mylon LeFevre, Stevie Woods, Johnny Gill, Emerson, Lake & Palmer, Garland Green, The Dynamics, The Fabulous Counts, and The Fatback Band. Cotillion was also responsible for launching the career of Luther Vandross, who recorded for the label as part of the trio Luther. Cotillion also released the triple-albums soundtrack of the Woodstock festival film in 1970. From 1970 it also distributed Embryo Records, founded by jazz flautist Herbie Mann after his earlier Atlantic contract had expired.

In addition to establishing Cotillion, Atlantic began expanding its own roster to include rock, soul/rock, progressive rock, British bands and singer songwriters. Two female artists were personally signed by Wexler, with album releases in 1969, Dusty Springfield (Dusty in Memphis) and Lotti Golden (Motor-Cycle), although Golden also had a close working relationship with Ertegun, who was instrumental in her signing with the label. By 1969, the Atlantic 8000 series (1968–72) consisted of R&B, rock, soul/rock and psychedelic acts. Other releases that year include albums by Aretha Franklin (Soul '69), Led Zeppelin (Led Zeppelin), Don Covay (House of Blue Lights), Boz Scaggs (Boz Scaggs), Roberta Flack (First Take), Wilson Pickett (Hey Jude), Mott the Hoople (Mott the Hoople), and Black Pearl (Black Pearl).

In 1969, Warner Bros.-Seven Arts was taken over by the Kinney National Company, and in the early 1970s the group was rebadged as Warner Communications. After buying Elektra Records and its sister label Nonesuch Records in 1970, Kinney combined the operations of all of its record labels under a new holding company, WEA, and also known as Warner Music Group. WEA was also used as a label for distributing the company's artists outside North America. In January 1970, Ahmet Ertegun was successful in his executive battle against Warner Bros. Records President Mike Maitland to keep Atlantic Records autonomous. As a result, Maitland was fired by Kinney president Steve Ross. Ertegun recommended Mo Ostin to succeed Maitland as Warner Bros. Records president. With Ertegun's power at Warners now secure, Atlantic was able to maintain autonomy through the parent company reorganizations and continue to do their own marketing, while WEA handled distribution.

=== Rock era ===
Some acts on the Atlantic roster in this period were British (including Led Zeppelin, Genesis, Yes, Bad Company and Phil Collins) and this was largely due to Ertegun. According to Greenberg, Ertegun had long seen the UK as a source of untapped talent. At his urging, Greenberg visited the UK six or seven times every year in search of acts to sign to the label.

For much of its early history, Jerry Wexler had been manager of the label, while Ertegun had concentrated on A&R and had less interest in the business side. That changed after the sale to Warner. Although Ertegun had been forced into accepting the sale, he turned the situation to his advantage. He gained executive control of the label and influenced the Warner group. By contrast, Wexler was disenchanted by Atlantic's move into rock; he left in 1975. Wexler's protégé Jerry L. Greenberg replaced him and played a role in Atlantic's success during the 1970s.

In seven years, Greenberg went from personal assistant to president of the label. Wexler had hired Greenberg and acted as his mentor, teaching him the daily operations of the record business. He learned how to treat musicians from Ertegun.

=== Signing Led Zeppelin and CSN ===
In 1968, by Peter Grant flew to New York with tapes of the debut album by British rock band Led Zeppelin. Ertegun and Wexler knew of the group's leader, Jimmy Page, through The Yardbirds. Their favorable opinion was reinforced by Dusty Springfield, who recommended Atlantic sign the band. Atlantic signed the band to an exclusive five-year contract. Atlantic described it in a press release as one of the "most substantial deals" in the label's history. Zeppelin recorded for Atlantic from 1968 to 1973. After the contract expired, they founded their label Swan Song and signed a distribution deal with Atlantic after being turned down by other labels.

In 1969, Stephen Stills was still signed to Atlantic under the contract dating from his time with Buffalo Springfield. His agent David Geffen went to Wexler to ask for Stills to be released from his Atlantic contract because Geffen wanted Stills' new group to sign with Columbia. Wexler lost his temper and threw Geffen out of his office, but Geffen called Ahmet Ertegun the next day, and Ertegun persuaded Geffen to convince Clive Davis at Columbia to let Atlantic sign Crosby, Stills & Nash.

The trio was formed following a chance meeting between members of three leading 1960s pop groups – Stephen Stills, David Crosby of The Byrds and Graham Nash of The Hollies. Stills and Crosby had been friends since the early 1960s; Nash had first met Crosby in the mid-1960s when The Byrds toured the UK, and he renewed the friendship when The Hollies toured the US in mid-1968. By this time creative tensions within The Hollies were coming to a head, and Nash had already decided to leave the group. Nash reunited with Crosby and met Stephen Stills (ex-Buffalo Springfield) at a party at the Los Angeles home of Cass Elliott in July 1968, during the Hollies US tour. After Crosby and Stills sang Stills' new composition "You Don't Have To Cry" that evening, Nash asked them to repeat it, and chimed in with an impromptu third harmony part. The trio's unique vocal chemistry was instantly apparent, so when Nash quit the Hollies in August 1968 and relocated to Los Angeles, the three immediately formed a trio, Crosby, Stills & Nash. After failing their audition for Apple Records, thanks to Ertegun's intervention and negotiations with David Geffen, who represented Crosby and Nash, as well as Stills, they ultimately signed with Atlantic, who gave them virtually complete freedom to record their first album.

The signing was complicated by the fact that Nash was still under contract to Epic Records (The Hollies' US distributor), but Ertegun used his diplomatic prowess to overcome this by arranging a 'swap' – he released former Buffalo Springfield member Richie Furay from his Atlantic contract, allowing Furay's new group Poco to sign to Epic, and in exchange Columbia Records (the parent company of Epic) allowed Nash to sign to Atlantic. In the event, Ertegun and Atlantic were the clear winners. Poco achieved moderate success for Epic, but Crosby, Stills & Nash's self-titled debut album (released in May 1969) became a huge and enduring hit, reaching #6 on the Billboard album chart, spawning two US Top 40 singles, becoming a multi-platinum seller and eventually earning a place in the Rolling Stone list of The 500 Greatest Albums of All Time.

Hot on the heels of the huge success of CSNY and Led Zeppelin, British band Yes rapidly established themselves as one of the leading groups in the burgeoning progressive rock genre. Their success played a significant part in establishing the primacy of the long-playing album as the major sales format for rock music in the 1970s. After several lineup changes during 1969–70, the band settled into its "classic" incarnation, with guitarist Steve Howe and keyboard player Rick Wakeman, who both joined during 1971. Although the extended length of much of their material made it somewhat difficult to promote the band with single releases, their live prowess gained them an avid following and their albums were hugely successful – their third LP The Yes Album (1971), which featured the debut of new guitarist Steve Howe, became their first big hit, reaching #4 in the UK and just scraping onto the chart in the US at #40. Beginning with their fourth album Fragile, each of the eleven albums they released between 1971 and 1991 (including the lavishly packaged live triple-album Yessongs) made the Top 20 in the US and the UK, and the double-LP Tales from Topographic Oceans (1973) and Going For The One (1977) both reached #1 in the UK.

Much of Atlantic's renewed success as a rock label in the late 1970s can be attributed to the efforts of renowned A&R manager John Kalodner. In 1974, the former photographer, record store manager and music critic joined Atlantic's New York publicity department. In 1975, Kalodner moved to the A&R department, rose rapidly through the ranks, and in 1976 he was promoted to become Atlantic's first West Coast director of A&R. Over the next four years he was instrumental in signing a string of major acts including Foreigner, AC/DC, Peter Gabriel and Phil Collins. Kalodner built his reputation by signing acts that other labels had turned down, and perhaps the most significant example of his achievements in this area was his championing of the Anglo-American band Foreigner.

The group was the brainchild of expatriate British musicians Mick Jones (ex Spooky Tooth) and Ian McDonald, one of the founding members of King Crimson. The demo tapes of the songs that eventually became their debut album (including the song "Feels Like The First Time") were famously rejected by almost every major label, including Atlantic – although their tenacious manager Bud Prager later revealed that, in retaliation for a previous bad deal, he deliberately did not approach CBS ("They had screwed me out of a lot of money, so I figured I would screw them out of Foreigner. The band was never even offered to them.")

Prager persisted with Atlantic, even though their A&R department and label President Jerry Greenberg repeatedly rejected Foreigner. Kalodner's belief in the group (and a live audition) finally convinced Greenberg to allow Kalodner to sign them and take them on as his personal project. Even then, Kalodner was turned down by twenty-six producers before he found someone willing to take on the project. Despite all the resistance, Foreigner was a success. Their 1976 debut single "Feels Like The First Time" reached #4 on the Billboard singles chart, their self-titled debut album sold more than 4 million copies, and the subsequent singles from the album kept the group in the US charts continuously for more than a year. In the years that followed, Foreigner became one of Atlantic's biggest successes, and one of the biggest-selling groups in history, scoring a string of international hits and selling more than 80 million albums worldwide, including 37.5 million albums in the US alone.

In 1978, Atlantic finally broke the leading UK progressive group Genesis as a major act in the US. Ahmet Ertegun had first seen them perform in the Midwest on one of their early American tours, and it was on this occasion that he also became an ardent fan of their drummer/vocalist, Phil Collins. Jerry Greenberg signed the group to Atlantic in the US in 1973 on Ertegun's advice, but although they were very successful in Europe, Genesis remained at best a "cult" act in America for most of the Seventies. In the meantime, original lead singer Peter Gabriel had left the group in 1975, followed in 1977 by lead guitarist Steve Hackett, reducing the group to a three-piece. Ertegun was directly involved in the recording of the band's 1978 album ...And Then There Were Three..., personally remixing the album's projected first single "Follow You, Follow Me". Although the group did not use this version, it guided them in their subsequent production. Collins later commented, "We didn't use his version, but we knew what he was getting at. He saw something more in there that wasn't coming out before". The released version of "Follow You, Follow Me" gave Genesis their first hit single in the US, the album became their first American gold record, and the experience resulted in Ertegun and Collins becoming close friends.

By 1979, Genesis drummer and singer Phil Collins was considering branching out into a solo career. Reacting to the breakup of his first marriage, he had begun writing and recording new songs at home, which were considerably different from the material he had been recording with Genesis. Although many in the industry reportedly discouraged him from going solo, Collins was strongly supported by Ertegun, who encouraged him to record an album after hearing the R&B-flavoured demo tapes Collins had recorded in his garage. Ertegun also insisted on changes to the song that became Collins' debut single. After hearing the song's sparsely arranged opening section, Ertegun said: "Where's the backbeat, man? The kids won't know where it is – you've got to put extra drums on it". Collins replied "The drums come later," to which Ertegun retorted "By that time the kids will have switched over to another radio station". Acceding to Ertegun's demand, Collins took the unusual step of overdubbing extra drums on the finished master tape, and he later commented, "He (Ertegun) was quite right".

By early 1980, when Collins was recording his solo album, the record industry was suffering greatly from the impact of the worldwide economic recession, and many labels were beginning to cull their rosters and drop acts that were not providing major returns. At this same time, Genesis' contract with Atlantic was up for renewal, and Collins was yet to sign as a solo artist. As part of the negotiations, Collins and his bandmates wanted their own 'vanity' label, Duke Records, but according to Kalodner, and despite Ertegun's personal interest, the group's demands, and their relatively modest performance in the US made Atlantic executives ambivalent about the deal. Kalodner was overseeing the recording of Collins' solo album while Atlantic were vacillating about signing the band and Collins, but it was at this point that Kalodner was abruptly dismissed from Atlantic, although he was almost immediately recruited to head the A&R division at the newly formed Geffen Records. Angered by his unceremonious ejection from Atlantic, he alerted Geffen to Collins' availability, but to his chagrin, neither Geffen nor any other US label showed interest. He then alerted Virgin Records boss Richard Branson, who immediately contacted Collins' manager Tony Stratton Smith and signed Collins to Virgin in the UK as a solo act.

Although Ertegun subsequently disputed Kalodner's account of the Genesis/Collins contract saga, he agreed that the loss of Gabriel was a big mistake, and his regret about his handling of the matter was only compounded by Gabriel's subsequent success with Geffen. Much of this was due to Kalodner, who later admitted that, as soon as Gabriel was dropped from Atlantic, he realized he had made a mistake. In order to make amends to Gabriel, he alerted both CBS and Geffen to the fact that Gabriel was available, and after a bidding war, Gabriel signed with Geffen. They released his fourth solo album (a.k.a. "Security") in 1982 to wide acclaim, and Gabriel scored a minor US hit with the single "Shock The Monkey". Gabriel achieved huge international success with his fifth album So (1986), which reached #1 in the UK and #2 in the US and sold more than 5 million copies in the US. He then scored a US #1 hit with the R&B-influenced single "Sledgehammer", which featured the legendary Memphis Horns, and which Gabriel later described as "my chance to sing like Otis Redding".

=== Long Branch warehouse fire ===
A fire destroyed most of Atlantic's tape archive in the early morning of February 8, 1978. It had been stored in a non-air-conditioned warehouse in Long Branch, New Jersey. The four-story warehouse, located at 199 Broadway, was the former location of Vogel's Department Store, before it closed down in March 1975. The building was purchased less than a week earlier and had been scheduled to reopen as a Nadler's Furniture Center, in an effort to revitalize the downtown area.

The building was owned by the family of Sheldon Vogel, the chief financial officer of Atlantic at the time. He had recommended moving the company's multitracks and unreleased recordings to the building after Ertegun had complained about the aforementioned tapes taking up too much space in the company's Manhattan offices in New York.

Although master tapes of the material in Atlantic's released back catalog survived due to being stored in New York, the fire destroyed or damaged an estimated 5,000–6,000 reels of tape, including virtually all of the company's unreleased master tapes, alternative takes, rehearsal tapes and session multi-tracks recorded between 1948 and 1969. Atlantic was one of the first labels to record in stereo; many of the tapes that were lost were stereo 'alternates' recorded in the late 1940s and 1950s (which Atlantic routinely taped simultaneously with the mono versions until the 1960s) as well as almost all of the 8-track multitrack masters recorded by Tom Dowd in the 1950s and 1960s. According to Billboard journalist Bill Holland, news of the fire was kept quiet, and one Atlantic staffer who spoke to Holland reported that he did not find out about it until a year later. Reissue producers and archivists subsequently located some tapes that were at first presumed 'lost', but which had survived because they had evidently been removed from the New Jersey archive years earlier and not returned. During the compilation of the Rhino-Atlantic John Coltrane boxed set, producer Joel Dorn located supposedly destroyed outtakes from Coltrane's seminal 1959 album Giant Steps, plus other tapes including Bobby Darin's original Atco demo of "Dream Lover" (with Fred Neil playing guitar). Atlantic archivists have since rediscovered other 'lost' material including unreleased masters, alternative takes and rehearsal tapes by Ray Charles, Vann "Piano Man" Walls, Ornette Coleman, Lennie Tristano and Lee Konitz.

=== 40th Anniversary concert ===
In May 1988, the label held a 40th Anniversary concert, broadcast on HBO. This concert, which was almost 13 hours in length, featured performances by a large number of their artists and included reunions of some rock legends like Led Zeppelin and Crosby, Stills, and Nash (being David Crosby's first full band performance since being released from prison).

=== 2000s ===
A country music division, which was founded in the 1980s, was closed in 2001.

Time Warner sold Warner Music Group to a group of investors for $2.6 billion in late 2003. The deal closed in early 2004, consolidating Elektra Records and Atlantic into one label operated in the eastern United States.

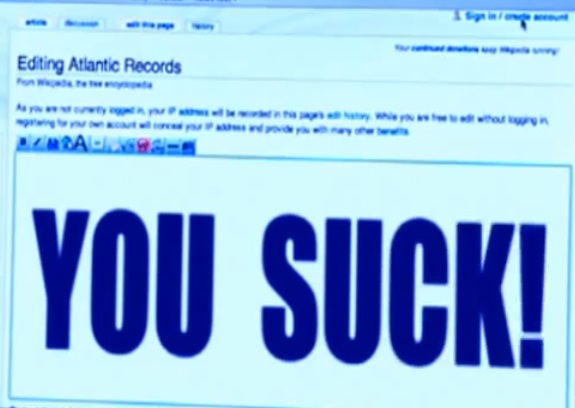
"Weird Al" Yankovic edits Atlantic Records' Wikipedia page to read "YOU SUCK!" in the music video for the song "White & Nerdy".

In 2006, the label denied "Weird Al" Yankovic permission to release "You're Pitiful", a parody of James Blunt's "You're Beautiful", despite Blunt's approval. Atlantic said it was too early in Blunt's career, and it did not want him to be a one-hit wonder. Although Yankovic could have made the parody anyway, claiming fair use, his record label, Volcano Entertainment, thought it best not to "go to war" with Atlantic. The parody was released online for free on June 7. He later recorded two more parodies, "White & Nerdy", and "Do I Creep You Out", both released September 26 to replace it. He wore T-shirts reading "Atlantic Records sucks" while performing live and, in the music video for "White & Nerdy", he defaces Atlantic's article on Wikipedia, replacing the page with "YOU SUCK!" in large type, which resulted in many repeat vandals.

In 2007, the label celebrated its 60th anniversary with the May 2 PBS broadcast of the American Masters documentary Atlantic Records: The House that Ahmet Built and the simultaneous Starbucks CD release of Atlantic 60th Anniversary: R&B Classics Chosen By Ahmet Ertegun.

That year also saw Atlantic reach a milestone for major record labels. According to the International Herald Tribune, "More than half of its music sales in the United States are now from digital products like downloads on iTunes and ring tones for cellphones", doing so "without seeing as steep of a decline in compact disc sales as the rest of the industry".

=== 2020s ===
In the early 2020s, Atlantic Records adopted new strategies to adapt to the changing media landscape. With new avenues for talent discovery, such as platforms like TikTok, the record company expanded its consideration for new talents to newly emerging artists on social media. Musical acts such as Flyana Boss, Efflo and Flawed Mangoes have subsequently been signed by the label as a result. In 2024, Atlantic Records signed New Zealand and South Korean singer Rosé, a member of the girl group Blackpink, for her solo career. In September 2025, it was announced Hilary Duff had signed with the label, with plans to release her first album in a decade, as well as a docu-series chronicling her return to music.

In May 2026, Ed Sheeran revealed his decision to depart Atlantic, citing his desire for a change in his professional career. Two months later, it was announced Miley Cyrus had signed with the label, transferring from Sony Music.

== Notable sublabels ==
- Asylum Records
- Atco Records
- Big Beat Records
- Custard Records
- LaSalle Records
- Maybach Music Group
- Owsla
- UpFront Records
- X5 Music Group
- Taylor Gang Records
- Terror Squad Productions
- Generation Now
- Swishahouse

== See also ==
- Atlantic Records discography
- Atlantic Records Group
- List of Atlantic Records artists
- List of record labels: 0–9
