= Mabel Smith =

Mabel Smith may refer to:

- Mabel Danvers Smith (1867-1956), later known as Mabel Danvers Ryder, Countess of Harrowby, English peeress
- Lady Mabel Smith (1870-1951), later known as Lady Mabel Fitzwilliam, English poliltician
- Mabel Smith Douglass (1874-1933), American college dean, namesake of Douglass College
- Mabel Waln Smith (1898–1961), American writer
- Mabel Smith (1917-1959), American singer known as Faye Richmonde
- Mabel Louise Smith (1924-1972), known as Big Maybelle, American singer

== See also ==
- Mabel Leilani Smyth (1892-1936), nursing director in Hawaii

- Mabel Smyth Memorial Building, historic building in Honolulu, Hawaii

- Mabel Smyth (17th century), wife of Sir Henry Tynte
