= Blues Ballads =

Studio album by LaVern Baker
- Released: October 1959
- Recorded: December 18, 1957 ("Why Baby Why", "It’s So Fine", "Whipper Snapper"); September 11, 1958 ("I Cried a Tear", "Dix-A-Billy"); March 14, 1959 ("If You Love Me", "So High, So Low"); June 7, 1960 ("How Often")
- Studio: New York City, New York, United States
- Genre: Blues; jazz
- Length: 28:04
- Language: English
- Label: Atlantic
- Producer: Ahmet Ertegun ("Whipper Snapper", "How Often"); Jerry Wexler ("Whipper Snapper", "How Often")

LaVern Baker chronology
Precious Memories: LaVern Baker Sings Gospel (1959)	Blues Ballads (1959)	Saved (1960)

Blues Ballads is the fifth studio album from American rhythm and blues singer LaVern Baker, released by Atlantic Records in 1959.

== Reception ==
Editors at AllMusic rated this album 3.5 out of 5 stars, with critic Ron Wynn writing that "these tunes didn't have any crossover appeal, but they're gritty, unpolished, and sung with the intensity and energy that made Baker's later material so memorable". A 1998 repackaging of this with 1963's See See Rider received 4.5 out of 5 stars, with critic Stephen Thomas Erlewine writing that in spite of minor flaws, "each are dominated by great songs and performances, illustrating what a terrific, powerful vocalist Baker was". Billboard gave the album 4 out of 4 stars, indicating "very strong sales potential" to retailers, speculating that it would have pop and rhythm and blues appeal. In the 2004 edition of The New Rolling Stone Album Guide, the two-album compilation was rated 3.5 out of 5 stars and the editors write that this music is the stronger half, calling it a "gut-wrencher" made up of "first-rate songs". George Starostin considered the album "a fun journey even if it contains more relative lows than highs" for its mix of genres.

== Track listing ==
1. "I Cried a Tear" (Fred Jay and Al Julia) – 2:34
2. "If You Love Me" (Marguerite Monnot, Geoffrey Parsons, and Édith Piaf) – 2:38
3. "You're Teasing Me" (Doc Pomus and Mort Shuman) – 2:15
4. "Love Me Right" (Bobby Darin and Don Kirshner) – 1:56
5. "Dix-A-Billy" (Paul R. Evans, Woody Harris, and Jack Reardon) – 1:53
6. "So High So Low" (LaVern Baker) – 1:50
7. "I Waited Too Long" (Howard Greenfield and Neil Sedaka) – 2:32
8. "Why Baby Why" (Darrel Edwards and George Jones) – 2:29
9. "Humpty Dumpty Heart" (Hank Thompson) – 2:35
10. "It's So Fine" (Tyran Carlo, Albert Green, and Berry Gordy Jr.) – 2:24
11. "Whipper Snapper" (lyrics: Jerry Leiber, music: Mike Stoller) – 2:07
12. "St. Louis Blues" (W. C. Handy) – 2:30

Compact disc bonus tracks

13. "How Often" (Baker) – 2:37
14. "A Help Each Other Romance" – 2:45
15. "You’re the Boss" (Leiber and Stoller) – 2:19
16. "I’ll Never Be Free" – 2:17
17. "I Didn’t Know I Was Crying" – 2:33
18. "Hurting Inside" – 2:14

== Personnel ==
- LaVern Baker – vocals
- Douglas Allan – marimba on "How Often"
- Mickey Baker – guitar on "If You Love Me" and "So High, So Low"
- Everett Barksdale – guitar on "I Cried a Tear", "Dix-A-Billy", and "How Often"
- Harry Breuer – xylophone on "Why Baby Why", "It’s So Fine", and "Whipper Snapper"
- Howard Biggs – arrangement on "Why Baby Why", "It’s So Fine", and "Whipper Snapper"; conducting on "Why Baby Why", "It’s So Fine", and "Whipper Snapper"
- Leon Cohen – alto saxophone on "I Cried a Tear" and "Dix-A-Billy"
- King Curtis – tenor saxophone on "I Cried a Tear" and "How Often"
- Sticks Evans – drums on "If You Love Me" and "So High, So Low"
- Panama Francis – drums on "I Cried a Tear" and "Dix-A-Billy"
- Urbie Green – trombone on "I Cried a Tear" and "Dix-A-Billy"
- Allen Hanlon – guitar on "Why Baby Why", "It’s So Fine", and "Whipper Snapper"
- Ernest Hayes – piano on "I Cried a Tear" and "Dix-A-Billy", organ on "How Often"
- Milt Hinton – double bass on "I Cried a Tear", "If You Love Me", "Dix-A-Billy", "So High, So Low",
- Marvin Israel – cover design
- Budd Johnson – saxophone on "If You Love Me" and "So High, So Low", baritone saxophone on "How Often"
- Taft Jordan – trumpet on "Why Baby Why", "It’s So Fine", and "Whipper Snapper"
- Harold L. Keith – liner notes
- Ben E. King – vocal duet on "How Often", and "A Help Each Other Romance"
- Bill Marine – choir vocals on "I Cried a Tear" and "Dix-A-Billy"
- Joe Marshall – membranophone on "Whipper Snapper"
- Wendell Marshall – double bass on "Why Baby Why", "It’s So Fine", "Whipper Snapper", and "How Often"
- Marcia Neil – choir vocals on "I Cried a Tear" and "Dix-A-Billy"
- Reggie Obrecht – piano on "How Often"; arrangement on "I Cried a Tear", "Dix-A-Billy", and "How Often"; conducting on "I Cried a Tear", "Dix-A-Billy", and "How Often"
- Jerry Parker – choir vocals on "I Cried a Tear" and "Dix-A-Billy"
- Jimmy Ricks – vocal duet on "You’re the Boss", and "I’ll Never Be Free"
- Chuck Sagle – arrangement on "If You Love Me" and "So High, So Low", conducting on "If You Love Me" and "So High, So Low"
- Jerry Schatzberg – photography
- Melvin "Red" Solomon – trumpet on "Why Baby Why", "It’s So Fine", and "Whipper Snapper"
- Ted Solomon – trumpet on "Whipper Snapper"
- Ted Sommer – membranophone on "How Often"
- Mike Stewart – choir vocals on "I Cried a Tear" and "Dix-A-Billy"
- Mike Stoller – piano on "Whipper Snapper"
- Sam "The Man" Taylor – tenor saxophone on "Why Baby Why", "It’s So Fine", and "Whipper Snapper"
- Moe Wechsler – piano on "Whipper Snapper"
- Unknown musicians:
  - Backing vocals on "Whipper Snapper"
  - Piano on "If You Love Me" and "So High, So Low"
  - Tenor saxophone on "Dix-A-Billy"
  - Trumpet on "If You Love Me" and "So High, So Low"
  - Vibraphone on "I Cried a Tear" and "Dix-A-Billy"

== See also ==
- List of 1959 albums
