= Precious Memories: LaVern Baker Sings Gospel =

Studio album by LaVern Baker
- Released: June 4, 1959
- Genre: Gospel
- Length: 35:55
- Language: English
- Label: Atlantic

LaVern Baker chronology
LaVern Baker Sings Bessie Smith (1958)	Precious Memories: LaVern Baker Sings Gospel (1959)	Blues Ballads (1959)

Precious Memories: LaVern Baker Sings Gospel is the fourth studio album from American rhythm and blues singer LaVern Baker, released by Atlantic Records in 1959.

== Reception ==
Professional ratings
Review scores
Source	Rating
AllMusic	3.5/5 stars
DownBeat	4/5 stars

Editors at AllMusic rated this album 3.5 out of 5 stars, with critic Ron Wynn writing this work is "more magnificent and moving than at any time she had done jazz, blues, or R&B". In the 2004 edition of The New Rolling Stone Album Guide, this album was rated 5 out of 5 stars and the editors write Baker never sounded better than on this album, favorably comparing her vocals to Mahalia Jackson and Sister Rosetta Tharpe.

== Track listing ==
1. "Precious Memories" – 2:50
2. "Carrying the Cross for My Boss" – 2:29
3. "Just a Closer Walk with Thee" (traditional) – 3:12
4. "Touch Me, Lord Jesus" – 2:52
5. "Didn't It Rain" (Harry Burleigh) – 2:48
6. "Precious Lord" – 4:13
7. "Somebody Touched Me" – 2:36
8. "In the Upper Room" – 2:34
9. "Journey to the Sky" – 3:25
10. "Everytime I Feel the Spirit" – 2:21
11. "Too Close" – 4:06
12. "Without a God" – 2:35

== Personnel ==
- LaVern Baker – vocals
- Abie Baker – bass
- Alex Bradford and His Singers – choir vocals
- Elliott Brodin – cover photography
- Tom Dowd – engineering
- Ahmet Ertegun – supervision
- Sticks Evans – drums
- Marvin Israel – cover design
- Phil Juhle – engineering
- Gary Kramer – liner notes
- Reggie Obrecht – conducting
- Bill Suyker – guitar
- Jerry Wexler – supervision

== See also ==
- List of 1959 albums
