= Saved (LaVern Baker album) =

Studio album by LaVern Baker
- Released: 1961
- Recorded: December 4, 1959 ("Must I Cry Again", "Eternally"); December 11, 1959 ("Manana", "Shadows of Love", "Shake a Hand"); February 26, 1960 ("Wheel of Fortune", "Senor Big and Fine")
- Studio: New York City, New York, United States
- Genre: Gospel; rhythm and blues
- Length: 27:51
- Language: English
- Label: Atlantic

LaVern Baker chronology
Blues Ballads (1959)	Saved (1961)	Richard Rodgers’ No Strings. An After‐Theatre Version (1962)

Saved is the sixth studio album by American rhythm and blues singer LaVern Baker and her second including Gospel music.

== Reception ==
Editors at AllMusic rated this album 3.5 out of 5 stars, with critic Steve Leggett writing that this "is arguably her greatest album" and that Baker "had every bit as much talent" and more famous singers like Etta James or James Brown, "and all of it is on display in this fiery collection".

The title track was the first recording of the Leiber and Stoller song to chart, reaching 17 on the R&B charts and 37 on the pop charts.

== Track listing ==
1. "Saved" (Jerry Leiber and Mike Stoller) – 2:34
2. "For Love of You" (LaVern Baker and Fred Jay) – 2:12
3. "Manana" (Dave Barbour and Peggy Lee) – 2:07
4. "My Time Will Come" (Brook Benton and Bobby Stevenson) – 2:25
5. "Shadows of Love" (Otis Blackwell) – 2:18
6. "Must I Cry Again" (Lincoln Chase, Lloyd Pemberton, and Jerry Valentine) – 2:32
7. "Bumble Bee" (Leroy Fullylove) – 2:23
8. "Shake a Hand" (Joe Morris) – 2:49
9. "Don Juan" (Leiber and Stoller) – 2:21
10. "Wheel of Fortune" (Bennie Benjamin and George David Weiss) – 1:59
11. "Senor Big and Fine" (Doc Pomus and Mort Shuman) – 2:15
12. "Eternally" (Charlie Chaplin and Geoffrey Parsons) – 1:56

Compact disc bonus tracks

13. "No Love So True" – 2:18
14. "Hey Memphis" – 2:28
15. "Loads of Love" – 2:23
16. "You Don't Tell Me" – 2:53
17. "Eager Beaver" – 2:08
18. "Itty Bitty Girl" – 2:17

== Personnel ==
- LaVern Baker – vocals
- Paul Ackerman – liner notes
- Stan Applebaum – arrangement on "Wheel of Fortune" and "Senor Big and Fine", conducting on "Wheel of Fortune" and "Senor Big and Fine"
- Abie Baker – double bass on "Manana", "Shadows of Love", "Must I Cry Again", "Shake a Hand", and "Eternally"
- Stephen Berrios – percussion on "Manana", "Shadows of Love", "Shake a Hand",
- Phil Bodner – reed instruments on "Manana", "Shadows of Love", and "Shake a Hand"
- Elise Bretton – choir vocals on "Manana", "Shadows of Love", "Must I Cry Again", "Shake a Hand", "Wheel of Fortune", "Senor Big and Fine", and "Eternally"
- Jim Buffington – French horn on "Wheel of Fortune" and "Senor Big and Fine"
- Al Caiola – guitar on "Wheel of Fortune" and "Senor Big and Fine"
- Lillian Clark – choir vocals on "Wheel of Fortune" and "Senor Big and Fine"
- George Duvivier – double bass on "Wheel of Fortune" and "Senor Big and Fine"
- Sticks Evans – drums on "Manana", "Shadows of Love", "Must I Cry Again", "Shake a Hand", and "Eternally"
- Jerome Graff – choir vocals on "Manana", "Shadows of Love", and "Shake a Hand"
- Lou Hurst – choir vocals on "Must I Cry Again" and "Eternally"
- Sam Kirson – cover
- Mundell Lowe – guitar on "Manana", "Shadows of Love", "Must I Cry Again", "Shake a Hand", and "Eternally"
- Gene Lowell – choir vocals on "Wheel of Fortune" and "Senor Big and Fine"
- Charles Magruder – choir vocals on "Must I Cry Again" and "Eternally"
- Jose Martinez – congas on "Manana", "Shadows of Love", and "Shake a Hand"
- James McGilliuroy – choir vocals on "Must I Cry Again" and "Eternally"
- Don McLeod – choir vocals on "Manana", "Shadows of Love", and "Shake a Hand"
- Romeo Penque – reed instruments on "Manana", "Shadows of Love", and "Shake a Hand"
- Peggy Powers – choir vocals on "Wheel of Fortune" and "Senor Big and Fine"
- Gretchen Rhodes – choir vocals on "Manana", "Shadows of Love", and "Shake a Hand"
- Gene Sculatti – liner notes on CD re-release
- Doc Severinsen – trumpet on "Manana", "Shadows of Love", and "Shake a Hand"
- Alan Sokoloff – choir vocals on "Manana", "Shadows of Love", "Shake a Hand", "Wheel of Fortune", and "Senor Big and Fine"
- Ted Sommer – drums on "Wheel of Fortune" and "Senor Big and Fine"
- David Vogel – choir vocals on "Manana", "Shadows of Love", and "Shake a Hand"
- Moe Wechsler – piano on "Manana", "Shadows of Love", "Shake a Hand", "Wheel of Fortune", and "Senor Big and Fine"
- Richard Wess – arrangement on "Manana", "Shadows of Love", "Must I Cry Again", "Shake a Hand", and "Eternally"; conducting on "Manana", "Shadows of Love", "Must I Cry Again", "Shake a Hand", and "Eternally"
- Unknown musicians:
  - Baritone saxophone on "Must I Cry Again" and "Eternally"
  - Bongos on "Must I Cry Again" and "Eternally"
  - Piano on "Must I Cry Again" and "Eternally"
  - Strings on "Must I Cry Again", "Wheel of Fortune" "Senor Big and Fine", and "Eternally"
  - Trombone on "Must I Cry Again" and "Eternally"
  - Trumpet on "Must I Cry Again" and "Eternally"

== See also ==
- List of 1961 albums
