= LaVern Baker (album) =

Studio album by LaVern Baker
- Released: 1957
- Recorded: February 20, 1955 ("That’s All I Need" and "Bop-Ting-A-Ling"); December 21, 1955 ("Jim Dandy"); January 10, 1956 ("Tra La La")
- Genre: Rhythm and blues; rock and roll
- Length: 38:14
- Language: English
- Label: Atlantic
- Producer: Ahmet Ertegun; Jerry Wexler

LaVern Baker chronology
LaVern (1956)	LaVern Baker (1957)	LaVern Baker Sings Bessie Smith (1958)

Singles from LaVern Baker
- 1. "Soul on Fire / How Can You Leave a Man Like This" Released: 1953

LaVern Baker is the second studio album from American rhythm and blues singer LaVern Baker, released by Atlantic Records in 1957. This release was part of Atlantic Records' 8000 Series, a collection of self-titled budget albums by R&B artists, made to allow retailers to easily introduce audiences to popular singers. This was one of the first albums to collect popular singles from a single artist.

== Reception ==
Editors at AllMusic rated this album 3.5 out of 5 stars, with critic Richie Unterberger writing that it has "generally decent quality" and features "energetic" songs of the "R&B turning into rock & roll" period. A 1998 repackaging of this with 1957's LaVern received 4.5 out of 5 stars, with critic Stephen Thomas Erlewine writing that "both records are excellent" and recommending it to listeners because it collects hard-to-find tracks, but complains that "a couple of cuts fall a little flat" and "the remastering and packaging aren't quite up to the standard of the music itself". In the 2004 edition of The New Rolling Stone Album Guide, the two-album compilation was rated 4.5 out of 5 stars and the editors write that this material features Baker with a "perky, wailing style" to her voice that complements her shift from blues-based singing to pop music. George Starostin noted "the super-catchy novelty numbers" and speculates that Baker "seems overqualified for this business".

== Track listing ==
1. "Jim Dandy" (Lincoln Chase) – 2:26
2. "Tra La La" (Johnny Parker) – 2:12
3. "I Can't Love You Enough" (LaVern Baker, Dorian Burton, and Howard Plummer) – 2:37
4. "Get Up, Get Up (You Sleepy Head)" (Jim Breedlove and Joan White) – 2:13
5. "That's All I Need" (Baker, Howard Biggs, and Chase) – 2:32
6. "Bop-Ting-A-Ling" (Winfield Scott) – 2:55
7. "Tweedlee Dee" (Scott) – 2:25
8. "Still" (Burton and Plummer) – 2:16
9. "Play It Fair" (Bill Campbell) – 2:55
10. "Tomorrow Night" (Sam Coslow and Will Gross) – 3:03
11. "That Lucky Old Sun" (Haven Gillespie and Beasley Smith) – – 2:52
12. "Soul On Fire" (Baker and Jermet [collective pseudonym of Ahmet Ertegun and Jerry Wexler]) – 2:51
13. "My Happiness Forever" (Doc Pomus) – 2:39
14. "How Can You Leave a Man Like This?" (Baker and Wexler) – 2:37

== Personnel ==
- LaVern Baker – vocals
- Mickey Baker – guitar on "That’s All I Need", "Bop-Ting-A-Ling"
- George Barnes – guitar on "Tra La La", "Get Up You Sleepy Head"
- Emmett Berry – trumpet
- Lawrence Brown – trombone
- Shad Collins – trumpet
- Walter DeVenne – instrumentation
- Ray Ellis – arrangement on "Still", conducting on "Still"
- Ahmet Ertegun – production
- The Gliders – choir/chorus vocals on "Jim Dandy", "That’s All I Need", "Bop-Ting-A-Ling", and "Tomorrow Night"
- Marvin Israel – cover
- Hank Jones – piano
- Connie Kay – drums on "That’s All I Need", "Bop-Ting-A-Ling", and "Tomorrow Night"
- Jimmy Lewis – guitar
- Dave McRae – baritone saxophone
- Freddie Mitchell – tenor saxophone
- Sylvester "Vess" Payne – drums
- Gene Redd – arrangement, conducting
- Guy Remark – liner notes
- Sam "The Man" Taylor – tenor saxophone on "That’s All I Need", "Bop-Ting-A-Ling", and "Tomorrow Night"
- Lloyd Trotman – double bass
- Jerry Wexler – production
- Pinky Williams – baritone saxophone

== See also ==
- List of 1957 albums
- Atlantic Records' 8000 Series:
  - Ruth Brown (album)
  - Ray Charles (album)
