= I Got a Woman =

Song written and composed by Ray Charles and Renald Richard

- 1964 Italian re-release

Single by Ray Charles

from the album Ray Charles
- B-side: "Come Back"
- Released: December 1954
- Recorded: November 18, 1954
- Studio: WGST studios, Atlanta, Georgia
- Genre: Rhythm and blues; soul
- Length: 2:51
- Label: Atlantic (45-1050)
- Songwriters: Ray Charles; Renald Richard
- Producer: Jerry Wexler

Ray Charles singles chronology
"Don't You Know" (1954)	"I Got a Woman" (1954)	"A Fool for You"" (1955)

"I Got a Woman" (originally titled "I've Got a Woman") is a song co-written and recorded by American R&B and soul musician Ray Charles. Atlantic Records released the song as a single in December 1954, with "Come Back Baby" as the B-side. Both songs later appeared on the 1957 album Ray Charles (subsequently reissued as Hallelujah I Love Her So).

== Origin ==
The song builds on "It Must Be Jesus" by the Southern Tones, which Ray Charles was listening to on the radio while on the road with his band in the summer of 1954, as well as a bridge inspired by Big Bill Broonzy's "Living on Easy Street". He and a member of his band, trumpeter Renald Richard, wrote a song that was built along a gospel-frenetic pace with secular lyrics and a jazz-inspired rhythm and blues (R&B) background. The song would be one of the prototypes for what later became termed as "soul music" after Charles released "What'd I Say" nearly five years later.

== Charles version ==
The song was recorded on November 18, 1954, in the Atlanta studios of Georgia Tech radio station WGST. It was a hit—Charles' first—climbing quickly to number one on the R&B charts in January 1955. Charles told the Pop Chronicles that he performed this song for about a year before he recorded it. The song would lead to more hits for Charles during this period when he was with Atlantic. It was later ranked No. 239 on Rolling Stone's list of the 500 Greatest Songs of All Time, one of Charles' five songs on the list. A re-recorded version by Ray Charles, entitled "I Gotta Woman" (ABC-Paramount 10649) reached No. 79 on the Billboard Hot 100 in 1965.

In 1990, the 1954 recording of the song by Ray Charles on Atlantic Records was inducted into the Grammy Hall of Fame.

=== Certifications ===
Region	Certification	Certified units/sales
Italy (FIMI)	Gold	25,000^{‡}
New Zealand (RMNZ)	Gold	15,000^{‡}
Spain (Promusicae)	Gold	30,000^{‡}
United Kingdom (BPI)	Silver	200,000^{‡}
^{‡} Sales+streaming figures based on certification alone.

== Elvis Presley version ==
"I Got a Woman"

Single by Elvis Presley
- B-side: "I'm Counting on You"
- Released: August 31, 1956
- Recorded: January 10, 1956
- Genre: Rock and roll, rockabilly
- Length: 2:22
- Label: RCA Victor (47-6637)
- Songwriters: Ray Charles, Renald Richard
- Producer: Steve Sholes

Elvis Presley singles chronology
"Blue Suede Shoes" (1956)	"I Got a Woman" (1956)	"I'll Never Let You Go (Little Darlin')" (1956)

The American singer Elvis Presley recorded his versions of the song on January 10, 1956, at RCA's studio in Nashville, Tennessee. The single did not chart, although it was a staple in most of Presley's shows during the 1950s and when he returned to perform live in 1969 all the way through 1977.

== Johnny Hallyday version ==
"I Got a Woman"

Single by Johnny Hallyday

from the album Sings America's Rockin' Hits
- B-side: "Be-Bop-a-Lula"
- Released: March 30, 1962
- Recorded: February 1962
- Studio: Bradley Studios, Nashville, Tennessee
- Genre: Rock and roll
- Length: 3:10
- Label: Philips
- Songwriters: Ray Charles, Renald Richard
- Producer: Shelby Singleton

Johnny Hallyday singles chronology
"Retiens la Nuit" (1961)	"I Got a Woman" (1962)	"Serre la main d'un fou" (1962)

From February 17 to 20, 1962, French musician Johnny Hallyday (who is considered the French version of Presley), for the first time in Nashville, at the Bradley Studios, recorded sixteen songs performed entirely in English, which would result in Hallyday's foreign-language and English-language debut and seventh studio album overall, Sings America's Rockin' Hits (1962), produced by legendary producer Shelby Singleton. These sessions included "I Got a Woman", which would be released as the album's only single in March 1962, with the album being released one month later. Hallyday's version peaked at Number 31 on the French Belgian charts in July 1962 and did not chart in any anglophone markets.

=== Track listings ===
1. "I Got a Woman" – 3:10
2. "Be-Bop-a-Lula" – 2:36
3. "Maybellene" – 2:02
4. "Blueberry Hill" – 2:35

=== Charts ===
Chart (1962)	Peak position
Belgium (Ultratop 50 Wallonia)	31

== The Beatles versions ==
The Beatles recorded two versions of the song for BBC Radio. The first version was recorded on 16 July 1963 at the BBC Paris Theatre in London for the Pop Go the Beatles radio show. This version was first released in 1994 on the Live at the BBC compilation.

The second version the band recorded was recorded on 31 March 1964 at the Playhouse Theatre in London for the Saturday Club radio show. This version was released in 2013 for the On Air – Live at the BBC Volume 2 compilation and is shorter than the Live at the BBC version.

== Cover versions, references and samples ==
Other versions that have made the pop or R&B charts in the US are those by Jimmy McGriff from his album I've Got a Woman (No. 20 pop, No. 5 R&B, 1962), Freddie Scott from his album Freddie Scott Sings (No. 48 pop, 1963), and Ricky Nelson from his album For Your Sweet Love (No. 49 pop, 1963).

Johnny Cash & June Carter Cash covered the song on their duet album Carryin' On with Johnny Cash & June Carter in 1967, and again in 1968 on Cash's infamous prison concert album At Folsom Prison.

The rock band Dire Straits mention the song in their song "Walk of Life", from their 1985 album Brothers in Arms at 2:44.

Kanye West's song "Gold Digger" from his 2005 album Late Registration contains samples of "I Got a Woman"; one particular line is repeated throughout the song in the background. An interpolation by Jamie Foxx, who portrayed Charles in the 2004 biopic Ray, of "I Got a Woman" serves as the introduction to "Gold Digger".

The John Mayer Trio covered the song in their 2005 live album Try!.
