= The Great Ray Charles =

Studio album by Ray Charles
- Released: August 1957
- Genre: Jazz
- Length: 37:37
- Label: Atlantic
- Producer: Ahmet Ertegun, Jerry Wexler

Ray Charles chronology
Ray Charles (1957)	The Great Ray Charles (1957)	Soul Brothers (1958)

Alternative cover
- CD re-issue with six extra tracks from The Genius After Hours

The Great Ray Charles is the second studio album by the American musician Ray Charles, released in 1957 by Atlantic Records. An instrumental jazz album, it features cover art designed by Marvin Israel. Later CD re-issues of The Great Ray Charles often include six out of the eight songs from the 1961 album The Genius After Hours, as bonus tracks.

== Release ==
Professional ratings
Review scores
Source	Rating
AllMusic	3/5 stars
DownBeat	4/5 stars

The Great Ray Charles was released by Atlantic Records in August 1957. Due to frequent airplay of two tracks off the album, "Doodlin'" and "Sweet Sixteen Bars", Atlantic released those two tracks as an EP later that same year.

== Track listing ==
=== Original LP release ===
All music is composed by Ray Charles, except where indicated.

Side one
No.	Title	Writer(s)	Length
1.	"The Ray"	Quincy Jones	4:00
2.	"My Melancholy Baby"	Ernie Burnett, George A. Norton	4:20
3.	"Black Coffee"	Sonny Burke, Paul Webster	5:32
4.	"There's No You"	Tom Adair, Harold Hopper	4:47

Side two
No.	Title	Writer(s)	Arranged by	Length
1.	"Doodlin'"	Horace Silver	Quincy Jones	5:54
2.	"Sweet Sixteen Bars"			4:07
3.	"I Surrender Dear"	Harry Barris, Gordon Clifford		5:08
4.	"Undecided"	Sid Robin, Charlie Shavers	Ernie Wilkins, Quincy Jones	3:40

Note: Some sources list "Ain't Misbehavin'" in place of "Black Coffee".

=== 1987 CD reissue ===
All music is composed by Ray Charles, except where indicated.

No.	Title	Writer(s)	Length
1.	"Dawn Ray (Note: One of six tracks from The Genius After Hours.)"		5:03
2.	"The Man I Love"	George Gershwin, Ira Gershwin	4:26
3.	"Music, Music, Music"	Bernie Baum, Stephen Weiss	2:53
4.	"Black Coffee"	Burke, Webster	5:43
5.	"The Ray"	Jones	3:55
6.	"I Surrender Dear"	Barris, Clifford	5:08
7.	"Hornful Soul"		5:29
8.	"Ain't Misbehavin'"	Harry Brooks, Andy Razaf, Fats Waller	5:40
9.	"Joy Ride"		4:39
10.	"Sweet Sixteen Bars"		4:06
11.	"Doodlin'"	Silver	5:53
12.	"There's No You"	Adair, Hopper	4:49
13.	"Undecided"	Robin, Shavers	3:40
14.	"My Melancholy Baby"	Burnett, Norton	4:22

== Personnel ==
- Ray Charles – celesta, piano
- Oscar Pettiford, Roosevelt Sheffield – bass
- Joe Harris, William Peeples – drums
- David "Fathead" Newman – alto and tenor saxophone
- Emmot Dennis – baritone saxophone
- Joe Bridgewater – trumpet, soloist
- John Hunt – trumpet

Technical

- Earle Brown, Tom Dowd – recording engineer
- Marvin Israel – design
- Lee Friedlander – cover photography
