= Waln =

Waln or WALN may refer to:

== People ==
- Frank Waln, a Sicangu Lakota rapper from South Dakota, United States
- Nora Waln (1895–1964) American journalist, author of The House of Exile
- Robert Waln (1765–1836) a United States Representative from Pennsylvania.

== Other uses ==
- WALN (FM), a radio station (89.3 FM) in Carrollton, Alabama, United States
- Western Australia Landcare Network, an affiliate of Landcare Australia
