= Abie Baker =

American jazz musician (1913–1993)

Abie "Available" Baker (né Leslie Robert Baker; September 28, 1913 – February 14, 1993) was an American session musician, arranger, and bandleader who played double bass on jazz, R&B, and pop recordings in New York City, from 1934 through the early 1960s. His credits have been chronicled under the names Abe Baker (rarely), Abie Baker (mostly), and Abie "Available" Baker.

== Career ==
He was born in South Bend, Indiana, United States. As a New York-based session bassist in jazz from 1934 to 1960, he recorded with Blanche Calloway, Snub Mosley, Herman Chittison, Joey Thomas, Titus Turner and the Howard Biggs Orchestra, Dosie Terry, John Greer, George James and the Howard Biggs Orchestra, Johnny Hartman and the Howard Biggs Orchestra, Jimmy "Baby Face" Lewis, Hadda Brooks, Melvin Smith (vocalist), The Du-Droppers, Annie Laurie, Larry Darnell, Ethel Ennis, Jimmy Tyler, Bobbie and Ronald (vocalists), Varetta Dillard, Cootie Williams, Bill Doggett, Little Willie John, Ruth Brown, King Curtis, LaVern Baker, Big Joe Turner, Teddy Humphries, Little Jimmy Scott, and Baby Boy Jennings & The Satellites.

Around 1936, he was a member of Claude Hopkins' touring orchestra.

By 1949, he had started recording in New York with his own trio and singer Richie Cannon (previously of The Ravens).

As New York session bassist in R&B during the 1950s, he recorded for labels that included Savoy and Atlantic with Sister Rosetta Tharpe, Marie Knight, Hadda Brooks, Nappy Brown, Big Maybelle, The Coasters, and The Drifters. He also played on the banned 1957 record "My Pussy Belongs to Daddy", credited to Faye Richmonde.

In filmography, Baker, in 1959, performed on "The Web", an instrumental released on the small Laurel label which was later used as part of the score for the camp horror movie The Brain That Wouldn't Die.

In June 1965, Baker established two record labels, Internationale and Forest Green, both in New York. He also established publishing companies. With Johnny Worlds, he established and headed Worlds-Baker Enterprises, covering several record labels, publishing, marketing and distribution.

He died in Harlem, New York, on February 14, 1993, at the age of 79.

== Family ==
Some sources state that he was the father of guitarist Mickey Baker, with whom he played on sessions during the 1950s, but this conflicts with other sources about Mickey Baker's parentage.

== Discography ==
With Bill Doggett

- Doggett Beat for Dancing Feet (King, 1957)

With The Coasters

- Along Came Jones
- Girls Girls Girls
- Little Egypt

With Lavern Baker

- Shake a Hand
- Saved
- "Bumble Bee"
- You Said
- My Time Will Come
- A Little Bird Told Me

With Ruth Brown

- Jack O' Diamonds
- I Can't Hear a Word You Say
- I Don’t Know
- Don't Deceive Me
- I Burned Your Letter
- What I Wouldn't Give
- The Door Is Still Open
- Taking Care Of Business
- Honey Boy
- Sure ‘Muff
- Here He Comes

With Nappy Brown

- Don't Be Angry (1961 version)
- Coal Miner
- Hoonie Boonie
- Any Time Is the Right Time

With The Top Notes

- Twist and Shout (the original version)
- Hearts of Stone
- Always Late
- The Basic Things
