= LaVern (album) =

Studio album by LaVern Baker
- Released: 1956
- Recorded: October 19, 1956 (second half of album)
- Studio: New York City, New York, United States (second half of album)
- Genre: Rhythm and blues
- Length: 30:56
- Language: English
- Label: Atlantic

LaVern Baker chronology
LaVern (1956)	LaVern Baker (1957)

LaVern is the debut studio album from American rhythm and blues singer LaVern Baker, released by Atlantic Records in 1956.

== Reception ==
Editors at AllMusic rated this release 3 out of 5 stars. A 1998 repackaging of this with 1958's LaVern Baker received 4.5 out of 5 stars, with critic Stephen Thomas Erlewine writing that "both records are excellent" and recommending it to listeners because it collects hard-to-find tracks, but complains that "a couple of cuts fall a little flat" and "the remastering and packaging aren't quite up to the standard of the music itself". In the 2004 edition of The New Rolling Stone Album Guide, the two-album compilation was rated 4.5 out of 5 stars and the editors write that this material features Baker as a "gut-bucket R&B singer" that combines blues and pop music.

== Track listing ==
1. "Lots and Lots of Love" (LaVern Baker) – 2:26
2. "Of Course I Do" (Chuck Willis) – 2:51
3. "You’ll Be Crying" (Vincent Corso) – 2:58
4. "Miracles" (Jerry Samuels) – 2:46
5. "I’m in a Crying Mood" (Fletcher Henderson and Willmette Ward) – 2:50
6. "Mine All Mine" (Bessie Smith) – 2:14
7. "Harbor Lights" (Gordon Kennedy, Jimmy Kennedy, and Hugh Williams) – 2:20
8. "I’ll Never Be Free" (Bennie Benjamin and George David Weiss) – 2:20
9. "Romance in the Dark" (Lillian "Lil" Green) – 3:00
10. "Everybody’s Somebody’s Fool" (Lionel Hampton) – 2:09
11. "How Long Will It Be" – 2:42
12. "Fool That I Am" (Floyd Hunt) – 2:20

== Personnel ==
- LaVern Baker – vocals
- Paul Ackerman – liner notes
- Tom Dowd – engineering
- Ray Ellis – arrangement and conducting on second half of album
- Ahmet Ertegun – supervision
- Marvin Israel – cover design
- Jerry Schatzberg – photography
- Jerry Wexler – supervision
- Unnamed session musicians playing bass guitar, drums, guitar, piano, and saxophone

== See also ==
- List of 1956 albums
