= Ray Charles (album) =

Studio album by Ray Charles
- Released: 1957, 1962
- Recorded: May 17, 1953 – November 27, 1956
- Genres: Soul, R&B
- Length: 41:30
- Label: Atlantic 8006
- Producers: Ahmet Ertegun, Jerry Wexler

Ray Charles chronology
Ray Charles (1957)	The Great Ray Charles (1957)

Singles from Ray Charles
- 1. "Mess Around" Released: June 19, 1953; 2. "Don't You Know" Released: July 1954; 3. "I've Got a Woman / Come Back" Released: December 1954; 4. "A Fool for You / This Little Girl of Mine" Released: June 1955; 5. "Greenbacks" Released: September 1955; 6. "Drown in My Own Tears / Mary Ann" Released: February 1956; 7. "Hallelujah I Love Her So" Released: May 1956; 8. "Ain't That Love" Released: January 31, 1957

Alternative cover
- re-release cover

Professional ratings
Review scores
Source	Rating
AllMusic	4.5/5 stars
The Encyclopedia of Popular Music	3/5 stars
The Rolling Stone Album Guide	4/5 stars

Ray Charles is the debut studio album by American pianist, vocalist, and band leader Ray Charles. Originally released in June 1957 on Atlantic Records, it was re-released under the title Hallelujah I Love Her So in 1962.

Although routinely identified as a debut album, Ray Charles could more accurately be identified as a greatest hits compilation, as all tracks had been previously issued and no fewer than 11 of its 14 tracks had been top 10 hits on the R&B chart between 1953 and 1957. In order, they were: "Mess Around" (#3, 1953), "Don't You Know" (#10, 1954), "I Got a Woman" (#1, 1955), "Come Back" (#4, 1955), "This Little Girl of Mine" (#9, 1955), "A Fool for You" (#1, 1955), "Greenbacks" (#5, 1955), "Drown in My Own Tears" (#1, 1956), "Mary Ann" (#1, 1956), "Hallelujah I Love Her So" (#5, 1956) and "Ain't That Love" (#9, early 1957).

The three remaining tracks ("Funny (But I Still Love You)", "Sinner's Prayer" and "Losing Hand") were non-charting B-sides originally issued in 1953–54. No tracks were recorded specifically for an album release.

== Critical reception ==
The Rolling Stone Album Guide thought that "lesser tunes like 'Funny but I Still Love You' and 'Losing Hand' are just as interesting" as the hits.

== Track listing ==
All music is composed by Ray Charles, except where indicated.

Side one
No.	Title	Writer(s)	Length
1.	"Ain't That Love"		2:51
2.	"Drown in My Own Tears"	Henry Glover	3:21
3.	"Come Back Baby"		3:06
4.	"Sinner's Prayer"	Lloyd Glenn, Lowell Fulson	3:24
5.	"Funny (But I Still Love You)"		3:15
6.	"Losing Hand"	Charles E. Calhoun	3:14
7.	"A Fool for You"		3:03
Total length:			22:14

Side two
No.	Title	Writer(s)	Length
1.	"Hallelujah I Love Her So"		2:35
2.	"Mess Around"	A. Nugetre	2:40
3.	"This Little Girl of Mine"		2:33
4.	"Mary Ann"		2:48
5.	"Greenbacks"	Renald Richard	2:52
6.	"Don't You Know"		2:57
7.	"I Got a Woman"	Ray Charles, Renald Richard	2:51
Total length:			19:16

== Personnel ==
- Ray Charles – vocals, piano
- The Ray Charles Orchestra – instrumentation
- Jerry Wexler – producer
- Marvin Israel – cover

== See also ==
- List of 1957 albums
- Atlantic Records' 8000 Series:
  - LaVern Baker (album)
  - Ruth Brown (album)
