= Margaret Ponce Israel =

American painter and ceramicist

- Born: December 24, 1929; Havana, Cuba
- Died: April 22, 1987 (aged 57); New York City, New York, U.S.
- Known for: Ceramics
- Spouse: Marvin Israel (m. 1950; died 1984)

Margaret Ponce Israel (also known as Marge Israel; December 24, 1929 – April 22, 1987) was an American painter and ceramicist who lived and worked in New York City.

She was born in 1929 in Havana, Cuba, and emigrated with her family to the U.S. as an infant. She attended the High School of Music & Art in New York and Syracuse University. She studied ceramics at Greenwich House Pottery, where she eventually became an instructor. She also studied in Paris, France, at the École nationale supérieure des Beaux-Arts, the Stanley William Hayter Graphic Art Studio, Atelier 17, and the Académie de la Grande Chaumière. In 1956 Israel won both first and second prize in ceramics at the Young Americans exhibition at the Museum of Contemporary Crafts, today the Museum of Arts and Design. She taught at Parsons School of Design, Greenwich House Pottery, the High School of Music & Art, and Y.M.H.A., all in New York City.

She was married to New York artist Marvin Israel from 1950 until his death in 1984.

She died in 1987, aged 57, in Manhattan after being hit by a tractor-trailer while riding her bike on West 23rd Street. Upon her death, her studio was overflowing with artwork. Her studio and home was a three-story building in Manhattan that was once a horse stable. There she housed a bantam rooster, guinea hens, doves, a rabbit, dogs, and a cat. Her works depict many of these animals, and an exhibition of her work entitled A Domestic Bestiary was shown at the Perimeter Gallery in Chicago in February 1998.

== Exhibitions ==
- 1959 - Charles Egan Gallery, New York City
- 1961 - Charles Egan Gallery, New York City
- 1971 - Cordier & Ekstrom, New York City
- 1972 - Bestiary, Cordier & Ekstrom, New York City
- 1988 - Garth Clark Gallery, New York City
- 1990 - Baruch College, New York City
- 1990 - Retrospective, Twining Gallery, New York City
- 1991 - Perimeter Gallery, Chicago, IL
- 1995 - 25th Anniversary Exhibition, Jane Hartsook Gallery, Greenwich House Pottery, New York City
- 1995 - The Nude in Clay, Perimeter Gallery, Chicago, IL
- 1995 - Artists' Artist, Studio School Museum, New York City
- 1996 - The Nude in Clay, Charles A. Wustum Museum of Fine Arts, Racine, WI
- 1996 - The Magical Art of Construction, Perimeter Gallery, Chicago, IL
- 1997 - Susan Teller Gallery, New York City
- 1997 - A Domestic Bestiary, Charles A. Wustum Museum of Fine Arts, Racine, WI
- 1997 - Retrospective, Perimeter Gallery, Chicago, IL
- 1998 - A Domestic Bestiary, Perimeter Gallery, Chicago, IL
- 1999 - 1945-1985: Hannelore Baron, Dorothy Dehner and Margaret Ponce Israel, Perimeter Gallery, Chicago, IL
