= Come Back Baby =

Song by Walter Davis
- Written: 1940
- Published: 1940
- Length: 2:46
- Songwriter: Walter Davis

"Come Back Baby" is a slow blues song written and recorded by the blues singer and pianist Walter Davis in 1940.

Ray Charles's version, with the title "Come Back" and with songwriting credited to Charles, was released as the B-side to Charles's 1954 single, "I Got a Woman". The song received airplay and peaked at number four on the R&B singles chart. It later appeared as "Come Back Baby" on his 1957 album Ray Charles, with songwriting still credited to Charles.

== Other renditions ==
- Lowell Fulson recorded in early 1950.
- Lightnin' Hopkins and John Lee Hooker recorded multiple versions.
- Stevie Wonder included a version on his Tribute to Uncle Ray album in 1962.
- Carolyn Hester recorded a version in 1962 with Bob Dylan accompanying on harmonica.
- Dave Van Ronk, accompanying himself on guitar, included it on his 1963 Folkways recording Dave Van Ronk, Folksinger.
- Bert Jansch covered the song on his 1967 album Nicola.
- Aretha Franklin later covered the song in a faster-paced version in 1967, featured on her Lady Soul album. Footage of Franklin recording the song can be found on a PBS documentary about her life. Franklin included a live recording on the album Aretha in Paris (1968).
- Love Sculpture covered the song in 1967, on their Blues Helping album.
- Hot Tuna covered the song on their 1970 debut album Hot Tuna.
- Plume Latraverse's 1978 album All Dressed includes a French language version of the song, with an entirely different set of lyrics, called "Cobaye Blues". It is erroneously credited as a 1928 song.
- Pinetop Perkins and Hubert Sumlin covered the song on their 1998 album Legends.
- Eric Clapton covered the song on his 2001 album Reptile.
- Jorma Kaukonen also covered the song on his 2007 album Stars in My Crown.
- Johnny Winter covered the song on his 2011 album Roots, featuring John Medeski (from Medeski Martin & Wood) on organ.
- Pat Donohue (member of The Guy's All-Star Shoe Band on NPR's A Prairie Home Companion) covered the song on his 2011 album Nobody's Fault.

== Credits ==
=== Ray Charles version ===
- Lead vocal and piano by Ray Charles
- Instrumentation by the Ray Charles Orchestra
- Produced by Jerry Wexler

=== Aretha Franklin version ===
- Lead vocals and piano by Aretha Franklin
- Background vocals by Erma Franklin and Carolyn Franklin
- Instrumentation by the Muscle Shoals orchestra
- Produced by Jerry Wexler
