= Walter Davis (blues) =

American blues singer, pianist, and songwriter (1912–1963)

Background information
- Born: March 1, 1911 or 1912; Grenada, Mississippi, United States
- Died: October 22, 1963 (aged 52 or 53) St. Louis, Missouri, United States
- Genres: Blues
- Occupations: Singer, pianist, songwriter
- Instrument: Piano
- Years active: Late 1920s–1953
- Labels: Victor, Bluebird
- Formerly of: Henry Townsend

Walter Davis (March 1, 1911 or 1912 – October 22, 1963) was an American blues singer, pianist, and songwriter who was one of the most prolific blues recording artists from the early 1930s to the early 1950s. He was unrelated to the jazz pianist Walter Davis, Jr.

Davis had a rich singing voice that was as expressive as the best of the Delta blues vocalists. His best-known recording, a version of the train blues standard "Sunnyland Blues", released in 1931, is more notable for the warmth and poignancy of his singing than for his piano playing. His best-known songs included "Come Back Baby", "Ashes in My Whiskey" and "Blue Blues". Davis was sometimes billed as "Hooker Joe".

== Biography ==
Davis was born on a farm in Grenada, Mississippi. He ran away from home at 13 or 14 years of age, landing in St. Louis, Missouri. He started singing with pianist Roosevelt Sykes and guitarist Henry Townsend. Davis made his first recordings, including the successful "M&O Blues", in 1930, as a singer accompanied by Sykes on piano.

A self-taught pianist, Davis increasingly accompanied himself as he became more proficient. His piano playing was described by blues historian Gérard Herzhaft as "primitive but expressive, with an irregular rhythm."

Influenced by Leroy Carr, and with a "mournful vocal tone" and a "reflective style and superior lyrics", Davis recorded prolifically for Victor and Bluebird, making over 150 recordings between 1930 and 1952. Many featured Townsend and/or Big Joe Williams on guitar. Described as "one of the finest and most original of all blues singers and pianists", Davis had a varied repertoire, including melancholy songs (such as "Tears Came Rollin' Down", written by Townsend), humorous songs, and songs laced with double entendres (such as "Think You Need a Shot"). According to Townsend, Davis "played some of the saddest songs that was ever heard about".

Townsend denied claims that Davis played club dates in the South and the lower Midwest with Townsend and Big Joe Williams, saying that Davis "didn't do no entertaining, not to my knowledge, none whatsoever. Walter was very, very bashful when it came to public entertainment. ... I've never known him to be booked on no job, not even no house party." Townsend stated that Davis's name was used falsely on club bookings by other musicians in the 1930s.

In 1940, Davis had a hit with his recording of "Come Back Baby", a song later recorded by Lowell Fulson, Ray Charles, and many others. Once he was well established as a popular recording artist, he performed regularly in hotels in St. Louis, sometimes with Townsend.

In 1952, Davis had a stroke, which effectively ended his recording career. His style of music was already becoming unfashionable. He worked for the rest of his life as a desk clerk in a hotel and as a part-time preacher. He died in St. Louis in 1963, aged about 52, and was buried in Greenwood Cemetery, in Hillsdale, Missouri.

== Legacy ==
Some of his songs have been covered by other performers. He was posthumously inducted into the Blues Hall of Fame in 2005.

In October 2012, the Killer Blues Headstone Project, a nonprofit organization, placed a headstone on Davis's unmarked grave at Greenwood Cemetery. The stone was unveiled at the 2012 Big Muddy Blues Festival in St. Louis.

== Sources ==
- Harris, Sheldon (1994). Blues Who's Who (rev. ed.). New York: Da Capo Press. ISBN 0-306-80155-8
