= The Genius After Hours =

1961 album by Ray Charles

Studio album by Ray Charles
- Released: 1961
- Recorded: April 30, 1956 – September 12, 1957, New York City
- Genres: Hard bop; jazz
- Length: 38:29
- Label: Atlantic
- Producers: Nesuhi Ertegun, Jerry Wexler

Ray Charles chronology
Genius + Soul = Jazz (1961)	The Genius After Hours (1961)	Ray Charles and Betty Carter (1961)

The Genius After Hours is an album by American musician Ray Charles, released in 1961. The songs featured on the album were taken from the same three studio sessions that created his 1957 album The Great Ray Charles, which featured the use of both a trio and a septet; the latter was arranged by Quincy Jones. Also appearing on The Genius After Hours is David "Fathead" Newman on tenor and alto saxophone, alongside trumpeter Joseph Bridgewater.

The Genius After Hours consists entirely of instrumental tracks. It was reissued in 1985 by Atlantic Jazzlore.

== Chart performance ==
The album debuted on Billboard magazine's Top LP's chart in the issue dated September 3, 1961, peaking at No. 49 during a seventeen-week run on the chart.

== Critical reception ==
Professional ratings
Review scores
Source	Rating
AllMusic	4.5/5 stars
DownBeat	4.5/5 stars
The Virgin Encyclopedia of Fifties Music	4/5 stars

In a 2003 review for AllMusic, jazz critic Scott Yanow summarized the album as "fine music; definitely a change of pace for Ray Charles."

== Track listing ==
All tracks are written by Ray Charles, except where indicated.

Side one
No.	Title	Writer(s)	Length
1.	"The Genius After Hours"		5:24
2.	"Ain't Misbehavin'"	Harry Brooks, Andy Razaf, Fats Waller	5:40
3.	"Dawn Ray"		5:03
4.	"Joy Ride"		4:39
Total length:			20:46

Side two
No.	Title	Writer(s)	Length
1.	"Hornful Soul"		5:29
2.	"The Man I Love"	George Gershwin, Ira Gershwin	4:26
3.	"Charlesville"		4:55
4.	"Music, Music, Music"	Bernie Baum, Stephan Weiss	2:53
Total length:			17:43

== Personnel ==
- Ray Charles – piano
- David "Fathead" Newman – alto saxophone, tenor saxophone
- Emmett Dennis – baritone saxophone
- Joseph Bridgewater & John Hunt – trumpet
- Oscar Pettiford or Roosevelt Sheffield – double bass
- William Peeples – drums

== Charts ==
Chart (1961)	Peak position
US Billboard Top LP's (150 Best-Selling Monoraul LP's)	49
