= Genius + Soul = Jazz =

1961 album by Ray Charles

Studio album by Ray Charles
- Released: February 1961
- Recorded: December 26–27, 1960
- Studios: Van Gelder, Englewood Cliffs, NJ
- Genre: Jazz
- Length: 36:14
- Labels: Impulse! A–2
- Producer: Creed Taylor

Ray Charles chronology
Soul Meeting (1961)	Genius + Soul = Jazz (1961)	The Genius After Hours (1961)

Singles from Genius + Soul = Jazz
- 1. "One Mint Julep / Let's Go" Released: 1961; 2. "I've Got News for You" Released: 1961; 3. "I'm Gonna Move to the Outskirts of Town" Released: 1961

Genius + Soul = Jazz is a 1961 album by American musician Ray Charles, featuring big band arrangements by Quincy Jones and Ralph Burns. Charles is accompanied by two groups drawn from members of the Count Basie Band and from the ranks of top New York session players. It was recorded at Van Gelder Studio in two sessions on December 26 and 27, 1960, and originally released on the Impulse! label as Impulse! A–2. Charles plays the Hammond B3 organ on all tracks.

The album was reissued in the UK, first in 1989 on the Castle Communications "Essential Records" label, and by Rhino Records in 1997 on a single CD together with Charles' 1970 My Kind of Jazz. In 2010, Concord Records released a deluxe edition comprising digitally remastered versions of Genius + Soul = Jazz, My Kind of Jazz, Jazz Number II, and My Kind of Jazz Part 3.

In 2000, the album was voted number 360 in Colin Larkin's All Time Top 1000 Albums, 3rd Edition. It was inducted into the Grammy Hall of Fame in 2011.

== Release and reception reception ==
Professional ratings
Review scores
Source	Rating
AllMusic	4.5/5 stars
The Encyclopedia of Popular Music	5/5 stars

The album debuted on Billboard magazine's Top LP's chart in the issue dated April 2, 1961, peaking at No. 4 during a forty-eight-week run on the chart.

In the Encyclopedia of Albums, edited by Paul Du Noyer, the album is described as "the eclectic Charles's only big-band jazzy get-together of the early Sixties"; the track "One Mint Julep" is highlighted as "[seeing] the versatile singer cool and confident enough to let the musicians do the talking, while he played the organ throughout. Yet his mixing together of various styles was vastly influential, and his legacy to singers was what Chuck Berry's was to guitarists." In 2000, Genius + Soul = Jazz was voted number 360 in Colin Larkin's All Time Top 1000 Albums, 3rd Edition.

In 2011, the album was inducted into the Grammy Hall of Fame.

== Track listing ==
All tracks are written by Ray Charles, except where noted.

No.	Title	Writer(s)	Arrangement	Length
1.	"From the Heart"		Quincy Jones	3:30
2.	"I've Got News for You"	Roy Alfred	Ralph Burns	4:28
3.	"Moanin'"	Bobby Timmons	Jones	3:14
4.	"Let's Go"		Burns	2:39
5.	"One Mint Julep"	Rudy Toombs	Jones	3:02
6.	"I'm Gonna Move to the Outskirts of Town"	Andy Razaf; Casey Bill Weldon	Jones	3:38
7.	"Stompin' Room Only"	Howard Marks	Burns	3:35
8.	"Mister C"		Burns	4:28
9.	"Strike Up the Band"	George Gershwin; Ira Gershwin	Jones	2:35
10.	"Birth of the Blues"	Ray Henderson; Buddy G. DeSylva; Lew Brown	Burns	5:05
Total length:				36:14

== Personnel ==
=== On all tracks ===
- Ray Charles – vocals, piano, Hammond B3 organ

=== December 26, 1960, session: Tracks 1, 2, 3, 7, 8 & 9 ===
- Clark Terry, Phillip Guilbeau, Thad Jones, Joe Newman, Snooky Young – trumpet
- Urbie Green, Henry Coker, Al Grey, Benny Powell – trombone
- Marshal Royal, Frank Wess – alto saxophone
- Frank Foster, Billy Mitchell – tenor saxophone
- Charlie Fowlkes – baritone saxophone
- Freddie Green – guitar
- Eddie Jones – bass
- Sonny Payne – drums

=== December 27, 1960, session: Tracks 4, 5, 6 & 10 ===
- Clark Terry, Phillip Guilbeau, Jimmy Nottingham, Joe Wilder, John Frosk – trumpet
- Jimmy Cleveland, Urbie Green, Keg Johnson, George Matthews – trombone
- George Dorsey, Earle Warren – alto saxophone
- Budd Johnson, Seldon Powell – tenor saxophone
- Haywood Henry – baritone saxophone
- Sam Herman – guitar
- Joe Benjamin – double bass
- Roy Haynes – drums

== Charts ==
Chart (1961)	Peak position
US Billboard Top LP's (150 Best-Selling Monoraul LP's)	4
