= LaVern Baker Sings Bessie Smith =

Studio album by LaVern Baker
- Released: 1958
- Recorded: January 27, 1958 ("Gimme a Pigfoot", "Baby Doll", "On Revival Day", "Nobody Knows You When You're Down and Out"); January 28, 1958 ("Money Blues", "I Ain't Gonna Play No Second Fiddle", "Empty Bed Blues", "There'll Be a Hot Time in the Old Town Tonight"); January 29, 1958 ("Backwater Blues", "After You've Gone", "Young Woman's Blues", "Preaching the Blues")
- Studio: New York City, New York, United States
- Genre: Blues; jazz
- Length: 41:46
- Language: English
- Label: Atlantic
- Producer: Nesuhi Ertegun

LaVern Baker chronology
LaVern Baker (1957)	LaVern Baker Sings Bessie Smith (1958)	Blues Ballads (1959)

LaVern Baker Sings Bessie Smith is the third studio album from American rhythm and blues singer LaVern Baker, released by Atlantic Records in 1958 and featuring cover versions of Bessie Smith songs. After her sophomore release LaVern Baker collected mostly previously released singles, this album included only new tracks. The album was initially released in monaural sound and sold well enough that Atlantic re-released it in stereo sound in November for the holiday season.

== Reception ==
Editors at AllMusic rated this album 4.5 out of 5 stars, with critic Scott Yanow writing that this album "should not have worked", but the combination of musicians and "potentially conflicting styles" of blues and jazz leads to "quite successful and often exciting" music. In the 2004 edition of The New Rolling Stone Album Guide, this album was rated 4 out of 5 stars and the editors write that this is "an essential document" that displays Baker's ability to sing with various moods and styles and shows "intelligence and personality" in reinterpreting the original work. George Starostin wrote of the music that "the arrangements are tight, thick, meaty, imposing, celebratory... and not particularly memorable" and praises the track selection as well as Baker's vocals as "beyond questioning", but considers the album "a bit dull".

== Track listing ==
1. "Gimme a Pigfoot" (Coot Grant and Wesley Wilson) – 3:08
2. "Baby Doll" – 3:37
3. "On Revival Day" (Andy Razaf) – 3:14
4. "Money Blues" – 2:52
5. "I Ain't Gonna Play No Second Fiddle" (John Henry ‘Perry’ Bradford) – 3:56
6. "Backwater Blues" (Bessie Smith) – 4:39
7. "Empty Bed Blues" (J. C. Johnson) – 4:52
8. "There'll Be a Hot Time in the Old Town Tonight" – 2:42
9. "Nobody Knows You When You're Down and Out" (Jimmy Cox) – 3:56
10. "After You've Gone" (lyrics: Henry Creamer, music: Turner Layton) – 3:09
11. "Young Woman's Blues" – 2:51
12. "Preaching the Blues" – 2:50

== Personnel ==
- LaVern Baker – vocals
- Danny Barker – guitar
- Buck Clayton – trumpet
- Jimmy Cleveland – trombone on "Money Blues", "I Ain't Gonna Play No Second Fiddle", "Empty Bed Blues", and "There'll Be a Hot Time in the Old Town Tonight"
- Vic Dickenson – trombone on "Gimme a Pigfoot", "Baby Doll", "On Revival Day", and "Nobody Knows You When You're Down and Out"
- Tom Dowd – engineering
- Nesuhi Ertegun – production
- Urbie Green – trombone on "Backwater Blues", "After You've Gone", "Young Woman's Blues", and "Preaching the Blues"
- Joe Marshall – drums
- Wendell Marshall – double bass
- Phil Moore – arrangement on "Gimme a Pigfoot", "Baby Doll", "On Revival Day", "Money Blues", "I Ain't Gonna Play No Second Fiddle", "Backwater Blues", "Empty Bed Blues", "There'll Be a Hot Time in the Old Town Tonight", "Nobody Knows You When You're Down and Out", "After You've Gone", "Young Woman's Blues", and "Preaching the Blues"
- Tom Palumbo – photography
- Nat Pierce – piano, arrangement on "Money Blues", "I Ain't Gonna Play No Second Fiddle", "Empty Bed Blues", "There'll Be a Hot Time in the Old Town Tonight", "After You've Gone", "Young Woman's Blues", and "Preaching the Blues"
- Paul Quinichette – tenor saxophone
- Jerome Richardson – baritone saxophone on "Backwater Blues", "After You've Gone", "Young Woman's Blues", and "Preaching the Blues"
- Sahib Shihab – baritone saxophone on "Gimme a Pigfoot", "Baby Doll", "On Revival Day", "Money Blues", "I Ain't Gonna Play No Second Fiddle", "Empty Bed Blues", "There'll Be a Hot Time in the Old Town Tonight", and "Nobody Knows You When You're Down and Out"
- Charles Edward Smith – liner notes
- Ernie Wilkins – arrangement on "Money Blues", "I Ain't Gonna Play No Second Fiddle", "Backwater Blues", "Empty Bed Blues", "There'll Be a Hot Time in the Old Town Tonight", "After You've Gone", "Young Woman's Blues", and "Preaching the Blues"

== See also ==
- List of 1958 albums
