= Saved (Leiber and Stoller song) =

1960 song

"Saved" is a gospel and R&B–flavored song written by Leiber and Stoller and first recorded by American singer LaVern Baker who released it in March 1961 through Atlantic Records in the US, and London Records in the UK. The "tongue-in-cheek" song is written from the perspective of someone who has lived a fast, loose life but is now exclaiming that they are "saved". The song is a satire of African-American religious conversion ecstasy.

On April 10, 1961, the recording first hit the US Billboard charts. It rose to number 17 on the R&B chart, and reached number 37 on the pop chart.

For his comeback special, Elvis Presley inserted the song into a medley along with "Where Could I Go But to the Lord" and "Up Above My Head" for the gospel production number. The song was also released outside of its original medley in 2018 in the compilation album "Where No One Stands Alone".

== Personnel ==
The musicians on the Baker recording include Gary Chester (drums), Dick Vance and Taft Jordan (trumpets), Rudy Powell (alto sax), Al Sears (tenor sax), Bert Keyes (piano), Lilton Mitchell (organ), Phil Spector (guitar), Abie Baker (bass), and Sticks Evans (bass drum). The arrangement was by Howard Biggs.
