= Think Twice (Jackie Wilson song) =

1965 duet by Jackie Wilson and LaVern Baker

Single by Jackie Wilson and LaVern Baker
- B-side: "Please Don't Hurt Me (I've Never Been In Love Before)"
- Released: 1965
- Genre: Soul
- Length: 3:02
- Label: Brunswick Records
- Songwriter: Eddie Singleton
- Producers: Eddie Singleton, Nat Tarnopol

"Think Twice" is an R&B duet sung by Jackie Wilson and LaVern Baker. It was a minor hit on the Billboard pop chart (peaking at No. 93), but fared better on the R&B chart, reaching No. 37.

== Production ==
"Think Twice" was the first time that good friends (and Brunswick Records label-mates) Wilson and Baker went into the studio together. Recorded in New York on September 2, 1965, the record featured an orchestra and chorus directed by Dale Warren; the song was written by Eddie Singleton and co-produced by Singleton and Nat Tarnopol. The B-side ("Please Don't Hurt Me (I've Never Been In Love Before)"), also by Wilson and Baker, managed to chart at #128.

=== "Version X" ===
The song was not a big hit upon its 1966 release, and may be better known today for an off-the-cuff X-rated rendition (which Wilson even introduces as "Version X"). Amid much laughter, the duo sing about their purported drug- and sex-crazed adventures ("I gave you all the reefer (and) all the cocaine," Baker says at one point, "and you still fucked up!"). Unsuitable for radio airplay at the time (or even today), "Version X" would not see an official release until it appeared on the compilation If It Ain't A Hit, I'll Eat My...Baby – The Dirtiest Of Them Dirty Blues on the Canadian label Zu-Zazz in 1987. (It can also be found on Eat To The Beat – The Dirtiest Of Them Dirty Blues, released in 2006 on Bear Family Records.)

Wilson and Baker would record seven more duets from 1965 to 1969 (including a cover of Johnny Ace's "Pledging My Love"), but none was a hit.
