= Mabel Waln Smith =

American writer (1898–1961)

Mabel Waln Smith (1898–1961) was an American writer.

== Life ==
Waln Smith was born in Grampian to a Quaker family. In 1922, she graduated from Swarthmore College. She was married in 1936 in Shanghai to Frederick Smith, a British shipping merchant. During World War II, she was taken prisoner in 1942 and held by the Japanese until the end of the war in Pudong concentration camp. In 1950, she and her husband, from whom she later separated, moved to Australia. In 1958, Waln Smith moved back to the US. She died at Casualty Hospital in Washington, D.C.

== Literary career ==
In 1940, Waln Smith published her first travel article on Korea in The Geographical Magazine. In the 1950s, she entered a Shanghai-related novel to a literary contest sponsored by the Sydney Morning Herald and published short stories for an Australian magazine, The Bulletin, about her experiences setting up an expatriate home in China and enduring a Japanese war camp. These stories appear in her second book, Springtime in Shanghai (1957).

Her first book about an alleged trip to Inner Mongolia in 1946, Land of the Swift-Running Horses (1956), contains plagiarized parts from Henning Haslund-Christensen's Tents in Mongolia (Yabonah) (1934) and Mongolian Journey (1949), Owen Lattimore's Mongol Journeys (1941) and Frans August Larson's Duke of Mongolia (1930), which was ghostwritten by Smith's sister, Nora Waln.

Her books were published in English, French and German.

== Books ==
- 1956: Land of Swift-running Horses: A Summer of Adventures in Mongolia. Harrap.
- 1957: Springtime in Shanghai. Harrap.
