= A Fool for You =

- 1968 French re-release

Single by Ray Charles

from the album Ray Charles (or, Hallelujah I Love Her So)
- B-side: "This Little Girl of Mine"
- Released: June 1955
- Recorded: April 23, 1955
- Genre: Rhythm and blues
- Length: 3:03
- Label: Atlantic
- Songwriter: Ray Charles
- Producer: Jerry Wexler

Ray Charles singles chronology
"Greenbacks" (1955)	"A Fool for You" (1955)	"Hallelujah I Love Her So" (1956)

"A Fool for You" is a bluesy, proto-soul single written and released by musician Ray Charles on Atlantic Records in 1955. The single was Charles' second number-one R&B hit.

== Personnel ==
- Lead vocal and piano by Ray Charles
- Instrumentation by the Ray Charles band
- Produced by Jerry Wexler

== Covers ==
- Ike & Tina Turner on The Ike & Tina Turner Show (Vol. 2)
- Stevie Wonder on I Was Made To Love Her
- Otis Redding on The Immortal Otis Redding
- Van Morrison on A Night in San Francisco and The Healing Game deluxe edition (both live versions, from 1993 and 1997)
- The Jackson 5 on Soulsation!
- Valerie Wellington on The New Bluebloods (1987, Alligator Records)
