= Mabel Smyth Memorial Building =

- U.S. National Register of Historic Places
- Hawaiʻi State Historic Preservation Division Historic Site
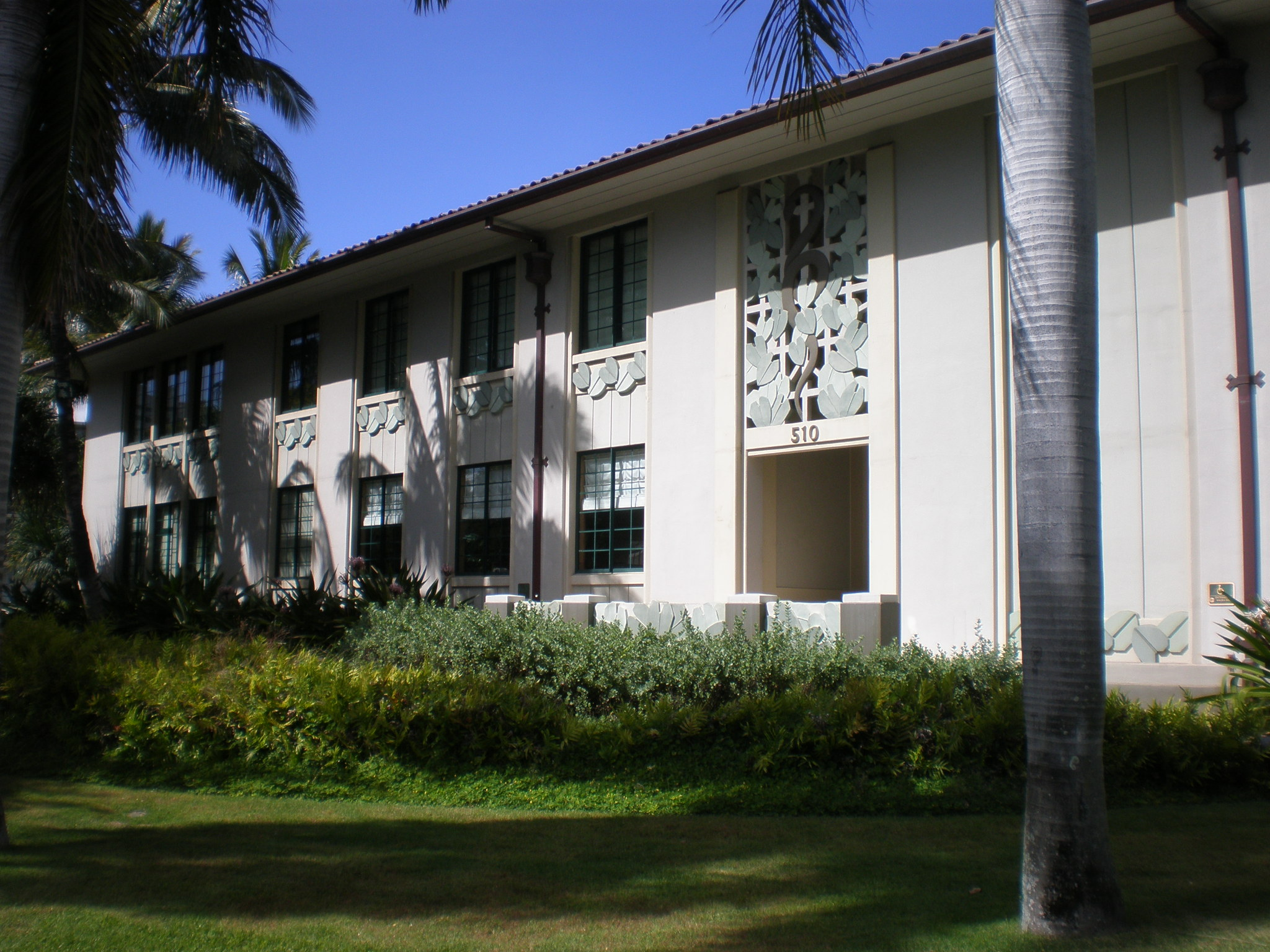
- The Mabel Smyth Memorial Building as photographed in 2009

- Location within Hawaii
- Location: 501 Punchbowl St., Honolulu, Hawaii
- Coordinates: 21°18′25″N 157°51′19″W
- Area: 0.7 acres (0.28 ha)
- Built: 1941
- Architect: Charles W. Dickey
- Architectural style: Art Deco, Hawaiian Style
- NRHP reference No.: 93001558
- Hawaiʻi SHPD No.: 80-14-9765
- Designated NRHP: February 3, 1994

The Mabel Smyth Memorial Building is a historic building in Honolulu, Hawaii. It was designed by Charles W. Dickey in 1937 and built in 1941. It was added to the National Register of Historic Places on February 3, 1994.

== Background ==
In 1937, Mabel Leilani Smyth died suddenly after serving as the superintendent of the Territory of Hawaii Public Nursing Service for eight years. In response to Smyth's death, a fund drive raised about $100,000 (the equivalent of $1,800,231 in 2025) with the intent of creating a memorial, and local architect Charles W. Dickey submitted plans for what would become the Mabel Smyth Memorial Building.

== Architecture ==
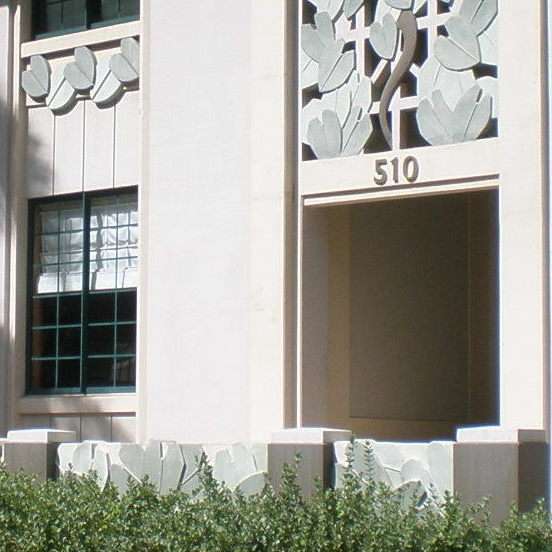
Detail of 'ape leaf design outside the main entrance

The building has an L-shaped structure with two stories, made of concrete, and with a tiled hip roof. A stairway from the parking lot up to the main entrance features a railing with an 'ape leaf design, and the same motif is repeated above the door in a panel that also includes a caduceus, as well as in smaller panels below the second story windows. The massing of the building is simple, and double doors on the second floor are carved with a torch ginger design. A renovation in 2000 led to major alterations of the building's interior design.

== Construction ==
In January 1940, a site was chosen for the building on the grounds of Queen's Hospital, oriented diagonally toward the intersection of Punchbowl and Beretania Streets. Although a different site for the building had been purchased for $15,000 in March 1937 ($335,937 in 2025), it was not used.

== Use ==
The building was dedicated on January 4, 1941, with an opening ceremony that involved Hawaiian chants and music. Plans were made almost immediately to provide a refresher training for nurses, which included a variety of demonstrations and lectures. In April 1941, a registered nurse at Queen's Hospital described the newly opened building as "the headquarters for Hawaii's professional nursing and medical organizations". It housed offices for various local nurses' associations, the Board of Registration of Nurses, and the Hawaii Territorial Medical Association and Honolulu County Medical Society. Additional amenities included a medical library and an auditorium with air conditioning.

== Designations ==
The Mabel Smyth Memorial Building was added to the National Register of Historic Places on February 3, 1994. It is also a Hawaiʻi State Historic Preservation Division (SHPD) Historic Site with Historic Site Number 80-14-9765.
