= Nora Waln =

American writer

Nora Waln (1895 – 27 September 1964) was a best-selling American writer and journalist in the 1930s–50s, writing books and articles on her time spent in Germany and China. She was among the first to report on the spread of Nazism from 1934 to 1938. She traveled widely in Europe and Asia, contributing articles to the Atlantic Monthly and other magazines. She was one of the few correspondents who reported from Communist China and Mongolia, reporting for the Saturday Evening Post for three and a half years, including reporting from the Korean War (1947-1951). She regularly contributed to the Atlantic Monthly from 1925 to 1962.

== Early years ==
She was the daughter of Thomas Lincoln and Lillian Quest Waln, from a Pennsylvanian Quaker family. Her mother was Swedish. Her sister was writer Mabel Waln Smith (1898–1961).

In 1918, she was Publicity Secretary of the American Committee for Armenian and Syrian Relief (later the Near East Foundation) and contributed a foreword to the book Ravished Armenia.

From childhood, she was interested in Chinese culture after learning of a family trading-connection with the Lin family of Hopei Province from the early 19th-century.

== China ==
Having made contact with the family, she left Swarthmore College before graduating, and in 1920, set out for China.

She ended up living for 12 years in the Lin household as a "daughter of affection" and developed this experience into her acclaimed memoir House of Exile, which was published in 1933. This gave readers an insider's look at Chinese culture and customs in a time of change following the overthrow of the Qing dynasty. The family was considered "exiles" because a Lin had been ordered by thirteenth-century Mongol Emperor Kublai Khan to help work with the Grand Canal in Hopei, and had moved North from the family's Canton homestead.

House of Exile sold well in England and America, as did French and German translations.

In 1930, Swedish traveller Frans August Larson published his book Larson, Duke of Mongolia about his adventures in Central Asia, which was ghostwritten by Waln.

== Marriage ==
While living in China, Waln met and married George Edward Osland-Hill, an English official in the Chinese Post Office, in 1922.

Ted Osland-Hill had one daughter from a previous marriage. She was Marie Osland-Hill, later Marie Wade.

Dialogue from Reaching for the Stars (Cresset Press, 1939) pp. 2–3

"Your husband is English, but you are not"

"I am an American, a Pennsylvanian".

"Where did you marry?"

"In China."

"Are you on the Continent only to enjoy yourselves?"

I explained: "Music has always been my husband's avocation. It was given a secondary place in his education, and before he was of age he was started on a career in government service in China.

His vacations he spent in study with private teachers and at the Royal College of Music in London. Now he had resigned. He had just completed eighteen months of music study in France, and was going to Germany to study."

== Germany ==
From 30 June 1934 to April 1938, she and her husband lived in Germany. She was moved to write Reaching for the Stars, completing it on Christmas Day, 1938. It was published in London by the Cresset Press and in Boston, USA by Little, Brown and Co. in April 1939. It sold well in England and America.

The book recounts the spread of Hitler's Nazi movement against a backdrop of her despair for the changes in a people she loved. In spite of the horror which she saw and described, she felt that the German people would revolt against Nazism.

Her damning exposé of Nazi Germany was a bestseller in the US in 1939 (ahead of Mein Kampf). The book was reissued in paperback by Soho Press in 1992 under a new title, The Approaching Storm: One Woman's Story of Germany, 1934-1938.

After the war, she returned to Germany and attended the Nuremberg Trials

== After Germany ==
In Britain, during the War, she served on the China Convoy Committee of Friends Ambulance Unit

After the end of the War, she traveled the world, filing stories for several prominent magazines. She returned to America, several times, to speak on the Chautauqua-Redpath circuit. Fliers for her tours in 1946, 1952 and 1955 survive in the organisation's archives now held by the University of Iowa Library.

A brochure for her 1952 speaking tour of the America states:

Just returned from three years in the Far East and six months of reporting the Korean War for the SATURDAY EVENING POST and ATLANTIC MONTHLY, Mrs. Waln has an incomparable background concerning Far Eastern affairs and the effect of American policy there.

With a speaking knowledge of Chinese (in four or five dialects), Japanese and Korean, she has lived in the homes of the people about whom she writes and talks. She has known Mao Tsetung, Syngman Rhee, Douglas MacArthur, as well as the GIs, Koreans, Turks, British, Dutch, Russian prisoners and other personalities who figure in the tragic drama of Korea.

As foreign correspondent, she landed with the troops on the Korean beach-head, flew on numerous reconnaissance missions, followed the battle line all the way up the Yalu River, and was one of the six correspondents present on the Manchurian border when the Chinese Communists began their attack.

If you are confused about American policy and Far Eastern affairs, if you wonder about the significance of the MacArthur dismissal, the strength of the Communists in Japan, the attitude of our troops in Korea. . .

and continues:

During her stay in Japan she lived with 23 Japanese families, and in her journeys to China and Korea, with the families she found along her route. For this reason, there is probably no American writer with a keener insight into the aspirations and hopes of the Chinese and Japanese people. A veteran reporter, Mrs. Waln covered General Patton's Army during World War II. She has recently been reassigned to Europe and will spend the summer of 1952 there as special writer and correspondent.

The brochure for her 1946 tour says: "During the war, she spoke extensively to large audiences throughout England and Scotland". Presumably this was between 1938, when she moved from Germany to her home on Buckinghamshire and the USA entering the war in 1942. Her Who's Who entry says her career included administering Kappa Kappa Gamma Fund for bombed mothers and children since 1940 and membership of the council, American Outpost in Britain. These activities presumably started during the 1939-1945 war.

The brochure for her 1955 tour gives more details of her travels:

The first year of the Korean war she spent most of her time at the front with the fighting men and was one of six correspondents who were on the Manchurian border when the Chinese communists began their attack. She narrowly escaped being captured.

Miss Waln knew Mao Tse-tung, Communist leader in China, when he was an assistant librarian of a university. He and the others are communists of the Marx-Lenin line. For many years, back to the time of Lenin, she says that Russia has had a plan to make China one of the Soviet republics.

On her latest European assignment for The Saturday Evening Post and The Atlantic Monthly she spent three months interviewing refugees along the Russian satellite border from Turkey to Finland.

In 1947, she was awarded the King Haakon VII Freedom Cross by the Government of Norway.

In 1956, she received the Distinguished Daughter of Pennsylvania Award.

Nora Waln died on 27 September 1964. Her husband had died on 5 January 1958.

== Publications ==
- The Street of Precious Pearls; New York, The Woman's Press, 1921, 96 pp. Available online on the Internet Archive website.
- The House of Exile, with illustrations by C. Le Roy Baldridge.; Boston, Little, Brown, and Company, 1933.
- La Maison d'exil. Mœurs et vie intime en Chine moderne. Traduction de Michel Epuy; Genève, 1934
- Süsse frucht, bittre frucht, China [House of Exile]; translated by L. Günther and Josephine Ewers-Bumiller, Berlin : W. Krüger, 1935
- Sommer in der Mongolei; Berlin : W. Krüger, 1936 "Aus dem englischen manuskript übersetzt von Josephine Ewers-Bumiller und L. Günther"
- Reaching for the stars Boston, Little, Brown and Company; 1939. Available online on the Internet Archive website.
- Reaching for the stars London, Cresset Press, 1939
- Reaching for the stars Australia, Lothian/Penguin books 1942
- Het huis van ballingschap; translated by Pauline Moody; Amsterdam: Meulenhoff, 1982. ISBN 9789029011273
- The House of Exile; with illustrations by C. Leroy Baldridge. Supplemental ed., New York : Soho Press, c1992. ISBN 093914977X Paperback 0939149788. Includes 5 chapters of Return to the House of Exile, written in 1947–1958; that book was never published separately. Review in Publishers weekly here. Available online on the Internet Archive website.
- The Approaching Storm: One Woman's Story of Germany, 1934-1938 London : Cresset Library, 1988. ISBN 0091732050 (paperback.) Series: Cresset women's voices [Reaching for the Stars retitled]. Available online on the Internet Archive website.
- The Approaching Storm: One Woman's Story of Germany, 1934-1938; New York : Soho, 1993. ISBN 093914980X. Paperback 0939149818 [Reaching for the Stars retitled]
- Surrender the Heart ?1961 - publication details not available. Mentioned in Friends Historical Library's listing of Research Papers.
- Sliding Doors appears to be another bibliographic ghost. The Speaking Tour brochure, cited above, states: "Her most recent book. Sliding Doors, which deals with her last 3 1/2 years in the Orient, will be published in the fall of 1952 by the Atlantic Monthly". No evidence of its publication has been traced.
