= See See Rider (album) =

Studio album by LaVern Baker
- Released: 1963
- Recorded: 1955–1963
- Genre: Rhythm and blues
- Length: 27:39
- Language: English
- Label: Atlantic

LaVern Baker chronology
Richard Rodgers’ No Strings. An After‐Theatre Version (1962)	See See Rider (1963)	Let Me Belong to You (1970)

See See Rider is the seventh studio album by American rhythm and blues singer LaVern Baker and her last for Atlantic Records. After this release, Baker slowed down her recording and touring for several years.

== Reception ==
Editors at AllMusic rated this album 3.5 out of 5 stars, with critic Bruce Eder writing "there is a little something for everyone", including many genres, moods, and styles that Baker explored in her music. In the 2004 edition of The New Rolling Stone Album Guide, the two-album compilation was rated 3.5 out of 5 stars and the editors write that this music is the weaker half, but continuing that listeners "can't go wrong" with her Atlantic period recordings.

== Track listing ==
1. "See See Rider" (traditional) – 2:32
2. "You Better Stop" (Jesse Stone, Danny Taylor, and Jerry Wexler) – 2:42
3. "He's a Real Gone Guy" (Nellie Lutcher) – 2:14
4. "Story of My Love" (Nugetre [a pseudonym of Ahmet Ertegun) – 2:10
5. "You Said" (Leroy Toombs and Sara Wright) – 2:19
6. "I'm Leavin' You" (Maurice King) – 2:31
7. "Don't Let the Stars Get in Your Eyes" (Cactus Pryor, Barbara Trammel, and Slim Willet) – 2:30
8. "Trying" (Billy Vaughn) – 2:07
9. "Half Your Love" (Charles Singleton) – 2:17
10. "A Little Bird Told Me So" (Ersel Hickey and Bert Russell) – 2:04
11. "Endless Love" (Barry Mann) – 2:01
12. "All the Time" (Mike Corda) – 2:12

== Personnel ==
- LaVern Baker – vocals
- Mickey Baker – guitar on "You Said"
- Emmett Berry – trumpet on "You Better Stop"
- Lawrence Brown – trombone on "You Better Stop"
- Shad Collins – trumpet on "You Better Stop"
- King Curtis – tenor saxophone on "He's a Real Gone Guy"
- Ahmet Ertegun – supervision
- Loring Eutemey – cover design
- Ernie Hayes – guitar on "He's a Real Gone Guy"
- Ed Kalish – liner notes
- Mundell Lowe – guitar on "Half of Your Love"
- Dave McRae – tenor saxophone on "You Better Stop"
- Clyde Olive – supervision
- Sam "The Man" Taylor – tenor saxophone on "You Better Stop"
- Allen Vogel – cover design
- Jerry Wexler – supervision
- Unidentified musicians include:
  - Backing vocals on "You Better Stop" and "Don't Let the Stars Get in Your Eyes"
  - Guitar on "You Better Stop"
  - Horns on "Half of Your Love"
  - Strings on "He's a Real Gone Guy"

== See also ==
- List of 1963 albums
