= I Cried a Tear =

Single by Lavern Baker

from the album Blues Ballads
- B-side: "Dix-a-Billy"
- Released: 1958
- Recorded: 1958
- Genre: Rock and roll; rhythm and blues
- Label: Atlantic
- Songwriter(s): Fred Jay, Al Julia

Lavern Baker singles chronology
"It's So Fine" (1958)	"I Cried a Tear" (1958)	"I Waited Too Long" (1959)

"I Cried a Tear" is a song written by Fred Jay and Al Julia and performed by American singer LaVern Baker. Atlantic Records released it as a single in 1958, which became Baker's most successful appearance on the record chart hits. King Curtis played the saxophone.

It peaked at number two on the Billboard R&B chart in 1959 and also peaked at number six on the pop chart.

In 1959, Ernest Tubb recorded the song. His version peaked at number twelve on the Hot C&W Sides chart.
