= Mabel Leilani Smyth =

Director of the Public Nursing Service for the Territory of Hawaii

Mabel Leilani Smyth

Mabel Leilani Smyth (September 1, 1892 – March 24, 1936) was a nursing administrator and the first Director of the Public Nursing Service for the Territory of Hawaii. She was of Hawaiian and Irish-English ancestry. Palama Settlement in Kalihi, where she had been the first head nurse of the program, eventually came under her authority at the Public Nursing Service. The Mabel Smyth Memorial Building in Honolulu, listed on the National Register of Historic Places, was erected in her honor.

== Early life ==
She was raised on a Kona coffee plantation, and grew up in a bilingual household. Her mother, Julia, was of Hawaiian ancestry, and earned a living by making Lauhala hats. She inherited Irish-English ancestry from her father, sea captain Halford Hamill Smyth. Her older twin sisters were Mabel, who died in infancy, and Eva. When Mabel Leilani was born, she was given the name of her deceased sister. After Mabel, her sister Julia was born, followed by her brothers: Charles, Harry and Joseph.

== Nursing ==
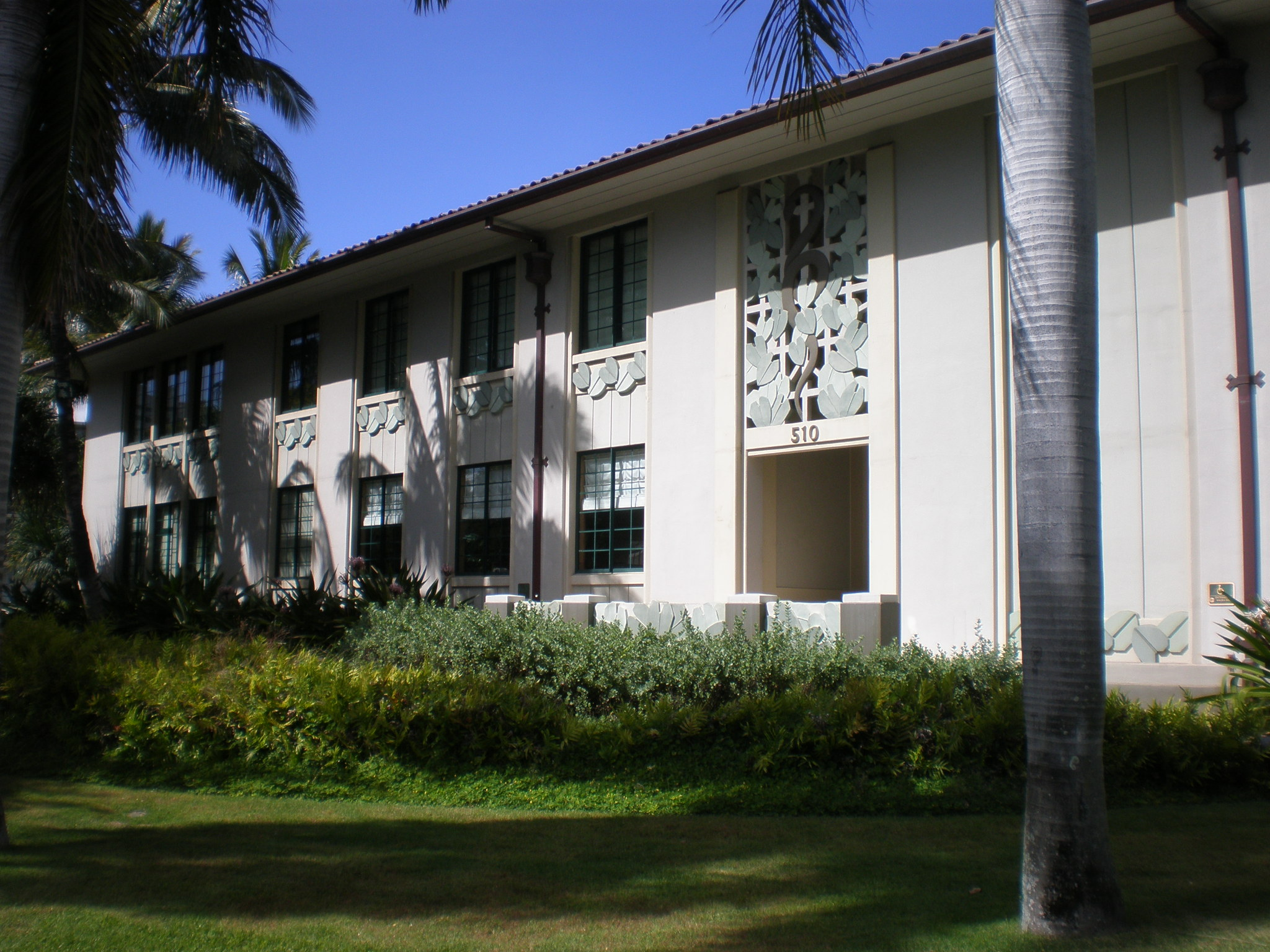
Mabel Smyth Memorial Building in Honolulu

Because her sister Eva was visually impaired, Mabel grew up in the role of care-giver. Sometime around the 1907 death of Captain Smyth, Mabel's family moved to Honolulu, where she completed her high school education. Mabel was counseled in her nursing career aspirations by Rev. Albert S. Baker, a medical doctor who was also her church pastor in Kona. He introduced her to James Arthur Rath and Ragna Helsher Rath who ran the health care facilities at Palama Settlement in Kalihi. Upon her graduation, Mabel was engaged as a care-giver for the Rath children on a 1911 trip to Massachusetts. She enrolled in the Springfield, Massachusetts Hospital Training School, returning to Hawaii after her 1915 graduation. Her first nursing assignment was in Kalihi Kae, before spending two years as a temporary director of the Hawaiian Humane Society, at that time an organization that provided care for both humans and animals. She was appointed at the first head nurse at Palama Settlement in 1918.

In 1921, Mabel took a year's sabbatical from her duties at Palama for post-graduate work at Simmons College in Massachusetts. Upon her return, she continued at Palama Settlement until 1927, when she was appointed as the first director of Public Health Nursing, a newly established department under the Hawaii Territorial Board of Health. Prior to this, there had been a separate division under the board for tuberculosis-related issues. Another separate division for maternal and infant hygiene had been headed by Dr. Vivia B. Appleton who left for another appointment. When Mabel was approved by the Board, the two divisions were reorganized as the singular Department of Public Health Nursing. Based on a 1929 recommendation by Dr. Ira V. Hiscock of Yale University, following a two-month field survey of health care in Hawaii, the Palama Settlement was also brought under the Department of Public Health Nursing.

During her career, she maintained memberships in the American Red Cross Nursing Service and the Hawaiian Civic Club. She was trustee of the Territorial Nurses Association and had served as president of the City and County of Honolulu Nurses Association.

== Death and legacy ==
Mabel died of a post-surgery embolism on March 24, 1936. The year following her death, a $100,000 memorial building was planned, financed through public fundraising. Designed by architect Charles William Dickey, the Mabel Smyth Memorial Building was officially opened January 4, 1941 on the grounds of The Queen's Medical Center in Honolulu. It was listed on the NRHP Oahu on February 3, 1994.
