= Faye Richmonde =

Background information
- Also known as: Faye Richmonde Taylor
- Born: Mabel Smith; February 21, 1917; North Carolina, US
- Died: March 23, 1959 (aged 42) Philadelphia, Pennsylvania, US
- Genres: Pop, novelty, jazz
- Occupation: Singer
- Years active: 1930s – 1959
- Label: Davis

Faye Richmonde (born Mabel Smith, later Faye Richmonde Taylor; February 21, 1917 – March 23, 1959) was an American night club singer, known for her risqué recordings in the 1950s.

== Life and career ==
She was born in North Carolina, the daughter of Joseph and Jessie Smith, but moved with her parents to Homestead, Pennsylvania as a child. She started performing during the 1930s, first winning a dancing contest with her brother in Philadelphia. The pair then began appearing in local nightclubs, before they toured the country as members of a band. She became a singer after she substituted for the band's regular singer who was ill, and then started regularly performing around the country as a nightclub singer.

In 1956 and early 1957, she recorded three albums worth of suggestive "special material" for Davis Records in New York City, accompanied by pianist Al Williams. The songs were in many cases written by Andy Razaf, some in association with record publisher and producer Joe Davis. Several of the songs had been previously recorded for Davis, in 1949, by Betty Thornton. Titles included "It Was Hard When I Kissed Her Goodbye", "The Swelling Of The Organ And The Coming Of The Bride", "My Pussy Belongs to Daddy", "You Ought to See Her Box", and "It's Smart To Be Smutty". The recordings by Faye Richmonde were issued on Davis' own label in three LPs, A Little Spice, For Men Only (both 1957), and Girlesque (1959; later issues are titled Girlesque Burlesque). The album covers showed ethnically white models in various states of undress, though Faye Richmonde herself was African-American.

Faye Richmonde died in 1959 at the age of 42, in hospital in Philadelphia, following complications from the birth of her third child.

Several of Richmonde's recordings, notably "My Pussy Belongs to Daddy", have been reissued on CD compilations of risqué 1950s material.

== Discography ==
- A Little Spice (1957)
- For Men Only (1957)
- Girlesque Burlesque (1959)
