= LaVern Baker =

American rhythm and blues singer (1929–1997)

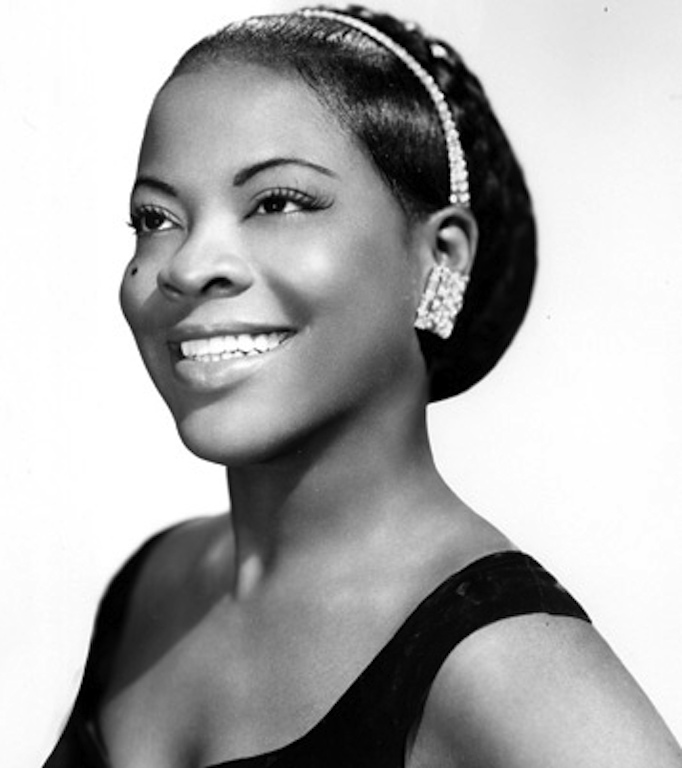
- Baker in 1956

Background information
- Also known as: Delores Williams; Little Miss Sharecropper; Bea Baker
- Born: Delores Evans; November 11, 1929; Chicago, Illinois, U.S.
- Died: March 10, 1997 (aged 67) Queens, New York, U.S.
- Genres: R&B; traditional pop; jazz; soul; rock & roll; blues
- Occupations: Singer, actress
- Years active: 1946–1996
- Labels: National, Okeh, Columbia, Atlantic, London, Brunswick
- Spouse: Eugene Williams (m. 1948)

Delores LaVern Baker (born Delores Evans; November 11, 1929 – March 10, 1997) was an American rhythm and blues singer who had several hit records on the pop charts in the 1950s and early 1960s. Her most successful records were "Tweedle Dee" (1955), "Jim Dandy" (1956), and "I Cried a Tear" (1958).

Baker was inducted into the Rock and Roll Hall of Fame in 1991. The Hall remarked that her "fiery fusion of blues, jazz and R&B showcased her alluring vocals and set the stage for the rock and roll surge of the Fifties". From 1955 to 1965, 20 of her songs made the R&B charts. Over the years, Elvis Presley recorded eight Baker songs.

== Early life ==
Born in Chicago, Illinois, United States, as Delores Evans, she was raised in nearby Calumet City. Under her mother's new surname, McMurley, Delores – on December 23, 1948, at the age of nineteen, in Cook County, Illinois – married Eugene Williams.

== Career ==
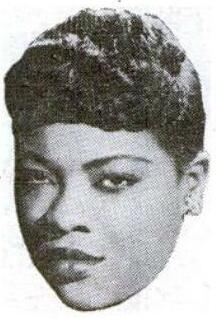
Baker in 1954

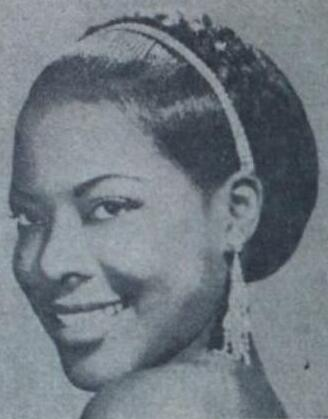
Baker c. 1957

Baker began singing in Chicago clubs such as the Club DeLisa in 1946, often billed as Little Miss Sharecropper, and first recorded under that name in 1949, leading to a recording deal with that title for National Records in 1951, shortly before it folded. She changed her name briefly to Bea Baker when recording for Okeh Records in 1951, switched to Delores Baker, and then was billed as LaVern Baker when she sang with Todd Rhodes and his band in 1952.

In 1953, Baker signed with Atlantic Records as a solo artist, her first release being "Soul on Fire". Her first hit came in early 1955, with the Latin-tempo "Tweedle Dee", which reached number 4 on the R&B chart and number 14 on the national US pop chart. It sold more than one million copies. Georgia Gibbs recorded a note-for-note cover of the song, which reached number 1; subsequently Baker made an unsuccessful attempt to sue her for $250,000 (equivalent to $3,004,658 in 2025) and petitioned Congress to consider such covers copyright violations, citing Gibbs and Vickie Young as copying her arrangement and vocal style. Her request spurred Charles Diggs to lead a Congressional investigation into song theft.

In 1955, Baker was the second most-played female artist in the United States after Etta James and she had a succession of hits on the R&B charts over the next couple of years with her backing group, the Gliders, including "Bop-Ting-a-Ling" (number 3 R&B), "Play It Fair" (number 2 R&B), and "Still" (number 4 R&B). She experienced success with both pop and R&B artists and she was one of the key musicians creating cross-over success for R&B. At the end of 1956, she had another hit with "Jim Dandy" (number 1 R&B, number 17 pop), which sold over one million copies and was certified as a gold disc. More hits followed for Atlantic, including the follow-up "Jim Dandy Got Married" (number 7 R&B), "I Cried a Tear" (number 2 R&B, number 6 pop in 1958, with sax by King Curtis), "I Waited Too Long" (number 5 R&B, number 3 pop, written by Neil Sedaka), "Saved" (number 17 R&B, written by Jerry Leiber and Mike Stoller), and "See See Rider" (number 9 R&B in 1963). In 1958, she was one of the best-selling artists for Atlantic, on a short list of musicians who never sold less than 50,000 units and by 1961, she had three million-selling singles: "I Cried a Tear", "Tweedle Dee", and "Jim Dandy". In addition to singing, she did some work with Ed Sullivan and Alan Freed on TV and in films, including Rock, Rock, Rock and Mr. Rock & Roll. In 1958, she recorded the Bessie Smith tribute album LaVern Baker Sings Bessie Smith. She then left Atlantic for Brunswick Records, for which she recorded the album Let Me Belong to You.

Baker toured Australia in 1957 as part of Lee Gordon's Big Show, performing with a number of rock 'n' roll bands including Bill Haley and the Comets. She also toured the West Indies, raising her international profile and becoming one of the most popular musicians in Jamaica.

In 1966, Baker recorded "Think Twice", a duet single with Jackie Wilson. The controversial song featured raunchy lyrics considered inappropriate for airplay at that time. Three versions were recorded, one of which is the version with the raunchy lyrics.

After divorcing Eugene Williams in late 1958, Baker married the comedian Slappy White February 19, 1959, in Baltimore. After the couple divorced in 1969, Baker signed on for a USO tour. She became seriously ill with bronchial pneumonia after a trip to Vietnam. While recovering at the U.S. naval base at Subic Bay in the Philippines, a friend recommended that she stay as the entertainment director at the Marine Corps Staff NCO club there. She remained there for 22 years, returning to the United States after the base was closed in 1991.

In 1988, she performed at Madison Square Garden for Atlantic Records' 40th anniversary. She then worked on the soundtracks of the films Shag (1989), Dick Tracy (1990) and A Rage in Harlem (1991), all of which were issued on CD. She performed a song for Alan Parker's film Angel Heart (1987), which appeared on the original vinyl soundtrack album but was not included on the later CD issue for contractual reasons.

In 1990, she made her Broadway debut, replacing Ruth Brown as the star of the hit musical Black and Blue at Brown's suggestion. In 1991, Rhino Records released the album Live in Hollywood, recorded at the Hollywood Roosevelt Cinegrill as well as Soul on Fire, a compilation of her Atlantic hits. In 1992, she recorded the album Woke Up This Morning for DRG Records. She continued performing after both legs were amputated because of complications due to diabetes in 1994. Baker made "Jump into the Fire", her last recording, for the 1995 Harry Nilsson tribute CD For the Love of Harry on the Music Masters label. She continued to perform live after the loss of her legs; in ailing health, she sang at a benefit concert honoring her in late 1996 that helped pay for her recent medical bills. At that time she said, "God took my legs, but He left me my voice so I could continue to do what I love, to sing and entertain."

In 1990, Baker was among the first group of eight recipients of the Pioneer Award from the Rhythm and Blues Foundation. In 1991, she became the second female solo artist inducted into the Rock and Roll Hall of Fame, following Aretha Franklin in 1987. Baker's song "Jim Dandy" was named one of the Rock and Roll Hall of Fame's 500 Songs That Shaped Rock and Roll and was ranked number 343 on Rolling Stone magazine's list of the 500 Greatest Songs of All Time. In 2020, Baker was inducted into the National Rhythm & Blues Hall of Fame

== Death ==
Baker died of cardiovascular disease on March 10, 1997, at the age of 67. She was buried in an unmarked plot in Maple Grove Cemetery in Kew Gardens, New York. Local historians raised funds for a headstone, which was erected on May 4, 2008.

== Discography ==
=== Singles ===
Year	Single (A-side, B-side) Both sides from same album except where indicated	Chart positions		Album
Year	Single (A-side, B-side) Both sides from same album except where indicated	^{U.S.}	^{U.S. R&B}	Album
1953	"Soul on Fire" b/w "How Can You Leave a Man Like This"	—	—	LaVern Baker
1954	"I Can't Hold Out Any Longer" b/w "I'm Living My Life for You"	—	—	Non-album tracks
1955	"Tweedlee Dee" b/w "Tomorrow Night"	14	4	LaVern Baker
1955	"Bop-Ting-a-Ling" /	—	3	LaVern Baker
1955	"That's All I Need"	—	6	LaVern Baker
1955	"Play It Fair" b/w "Lucky Old Sun"	—	2	LaVern Baker
1956	"My Happiness Forever" /	—	13	LaVern Baker
1956	"Get Up Get Up"	—	15	LaVern Baker
1956	"Fee Fee Fi Fo Fum" b/w "I'll Do the Same for You"	—	—	Non-album tracks
1956	"Still" /	97	4	LaVern Baker
1956	"I Can't Love You Enough"	22	7	LaVern Baker
1956	"Jim Dandy" /	17	1	LaVern Baker
1956	"Tra La La"	94	Flip	LaVern Baker
1957	"Jim Dandy Got Married" b/w "The Game of Love"	76	7	Non-album tracks
1957	"Humpty Dumpty Heart" b/w "Love Me Right"	71	—	Blues Ballads
1957	"St. Louis Blues" b/w "Miracles" (from LaVern)	—	—	Blues Ballads
1958	"Substitute" b/w "Learning to Love"	—	—	Non-album tracks
1958	"Harbor Lights" b/w "Whipper Snapper" (from Blues Ballads)	—	—	LaVern
1958	"It's So Fine" b/w "Why Baby Why"	—	24	Blues Ballads
1958	"I Cried a Tear" b/w "Dix-a-Billy"	6	2	Blues Ballads
1959	"I Waited Too Long" b/w "You're Teasing Me"	33	5	Blues Ballads
1959	"So High So Low" /	52	12	Blues Ballads
1959	"If You Love Me"	79	—	Blues Ballads
1959	"Tiny Tim" b/w "For Love of You" (from Saved)	63	18	Non-album track
1960	"Shake a Hand" b/w "Manana"	—	13	Saved
1960	"Wheel of Fortune" /	83	—	Saved
1960	"Shadows of Love"	83	—	Saved
1960	"A Help-Each-Other Romance" b/w "How Often"; Both tracks with Ben E. King	—	—	Non-album tracks
1960	"Bumble Bee" b/w "My Time Will Come"	46	—	Saved
1961	"You're the Boss" (with Jimmy Ricks) /	81	—	Non-album tracks
1961	"I'll Never Be Free" (with Jimmy Ricks)	103	—	Non-album tracks
1961	"Saved" b/w "Don Juan"	37	17	Saved
1961	"I Didn't Know I Was Crying" b/w "Hurtin' Inside"	—	—	Non-album tracks
1961	"Hey, Memphis" b/w "Voodoo Voodoo"	—	—	Non-album tracks
1962	"No Love So True" b/w "Must I Cry Again" (from Saved)	—	—	Non-album tracks
1962	"See See Rider" b/w "The Story of My Love"	34	9	See See Rider
1963	"Trouble in Mind" b/w "Half of Your Love" (from See See Rider)	—	—	Non-album tracks
1963	"Itty Bitty Girl" b/w "Oh, Johnny Oh, Johnny"	—	—	Non-album tracks
1964	"You Better Find Yourself Another Fool" b/w "Go Away"	128	—	Non-album tracks
1965	"Fly Me to the Moon" b/w "Ain't Gonna Cry No More"	84	31	Non-album tracks
1965	"Let Me Belong to You" b/w "Pledging My Love"	—	—	Let Me Belong to You
1966	"Think Twice" (with Jackie Wilson) /	93	37	Non-album tracks
1966	"Please Don't Hurt Me" (with Jackie Wilson)	128	—	Non-album tracks
1966	"One Monkey (Don't Stop the Show)" b/w "Baby" (from Let Me Belong to You)	—	—	Non-album tracks
1966	"Batman to the Rescue" b/w "Call Me Darling" (from Let Me Belong to You)	135	—	Non-album tracks
1967	"Wrapped, Tied and Tangled" b/w "Nothing Like Being in Love"	—	—	Non-album tracks
1967	"Born to Lose" b/w "I Need You So"	—	—	Let Me Belong to You
1969	"I'm the One to Do It" b/w "Baby"	—	—	Let Me Belong to You

=== Albums ===
- LaVern (1956)
- LaVern Baker (1957)
- LaVern Baker Sings Bessie Smith (1958)
- Precious Memories: LaVern Baker Sings Gospel (1959)
- Blues Ballads (1959)
- Saved (1961)
- Richard Rodgers’ No Strings. An After‐Theatre Version (1962, with Chris Connor, Herbie Mann, and Bobby Short)
- See See Rider (1963)
- Let Me Belong to You (1970)
  Side A
  1. "Pledging My Love"
  2. "Let Me Belong to You"
  3. "I'm the One to Do It"
  4. "Baby"
  5. "Born to Lose"
  Side B
  1. "Call Me Darling"
  2. "Love Is Ending"
  3. "Baby Don't You Do It"
  4. "I Need You So"
  5. "Play It Fair"
- Woke Up This Mornin' (1992)
