= Howard Biggs =

American pianist, songwriter and arranger (1916–1999)

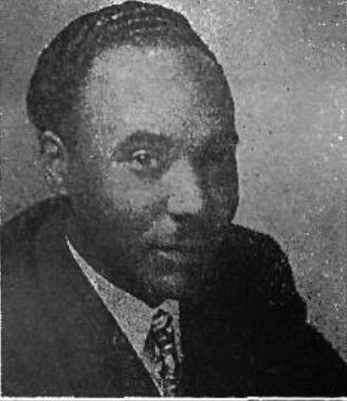
- From Billboard 1944 Music Yearbook

Background information
- Born: Howard Maceo Biggs; October 13, 1916; Seattle, Washington, United States
- Died: November 24, 1999 (aged 83) Houston, Texas, US
- Genres: R&B, jazz, musical theatre
- Occupations: Pianist, songwriter, arranger
- Instrument: Piano
- Years active: 1927– c.1980

Howard Maceo Biggs (October 13, 1916 – November 24, 1999) was an American pianist, songwriter and arranger. He is noted for his involvement with doo-wop and other styles including jazz, and was influential in the first days of rock and roll.

== Biography ==
Born in Seattle, Washington, the son of naval machinist Antonio Biggs and Thelma Buchanan, he learned piano as a child and gave his first concert at the First African Methodist Episcopal Church in the city at the age of ten. He studied at the University of Washington before becoming resident composer with the Negro Repertory Company in Seattle. In 1937 he composed the score for the company's production An Evening with Dunbar, based on the life and poems of Paul Laurence Dunbar, and wrote several songs incorporating Dunbar's words as well as directing the theatre chorus. In 1939 he wrote the score for a musical version of The Taming of the Shrew, performed in Seattle by the Federal Theatre Negro Unit.

After touring as a concert performer, he played in lounges on the West Coast before heading east to join Noble Sissle's orchestra. By 1944, he was performing in clubs in New York City. At that time, Billboard said of him: "Unlike most colored pianists, he doesn't lean much to boogie-woogie, but specializes in unusually smart arrangements of pops, show tunes, middlebrow and classics." He became established as a pianist with the Luis Russell Orchestra, before working as pianist and arranger with many R&B vocal groups on their live performances and recordings, starting with The Ravens, with whom he worked from 1946 to 1949. He wrote two of the Ravens' first hit records, "Write Me a Letter", credited as the first R&B record to hit the national pop top 25, and "Bye Bye Baby Blues", and co-wrote several others with the group's singer Jimmy Ricks. Biggs then joined another group, the Beavers, for whom he wrote "I'd Rather Be Wrong Than Blue" with Joe Thomas, who had previously been a saxophonist with Jelly Roll Morton.

In early 1950 Biggs left the Beavers when he was appointed musical director at Regal Records. Over the next few years he worked as pianist and arranger for several leading R&B vocal groups including The Five Keys and The Glowtones, and for various record labels including RCA Victor and Junior. He established a songwriting partnership with Joe Thomas, and they co-wrote the songs "Got You on My Mind", a #2 R&B hit for John Greer in 1952, later recorded by Big Joe Turner, Jerry Lee Lewis, Eric Clapton and others; "I'm Gonna Sit Right Down and Cry (Over You)", recorded by Roy Hamilton in 1954 and later by both Elvis Presley and The Beatles; "Melancholy Me", recorded by Eddy Howard; and "That's All I Need", written by Biggs, Thomas, and LaVern Baker. He also wrote "If I Could Have Your Love Again," with singer Brook Benton. He continued to perform, and in the early 1950s backed Little Jimmy Scott with a band that included bassist Charles Mingus and guitarist Mundell Lowe. He later led the Howard Biggs Orchestra which backed leading jazz and R&B vocalists including Dinah Washington, Dakota Staton, Marie Knight and Johnny Hartman.

In 1957, while working at the Junior label, he was credited with arranging "Get a Job" by The Silhouettes, a #1 R&B and pop hit the following year. However, the group's singer Richard Lewis said: "The true story is, when we auditioned 'Get A Job' for Kae [Williams], the arrangement was as it is on the record. Howard Biggs did the charts for the session based on our arrangement. He tried to replace our opening ("dip dip dip...") with a musical intro. It was scrapped because it didn't work".

Biggs later moved to Houston, Texas, and in the mid-1970s performed regularly as a solo jazz pianist in clubs and restaurants in the city. He married Joan Cockrell, thirty years his junior, in Houston in 1984. He died in Houston in 1999.
