= Marvin Israel =

American artist, photographer, painter, teacher and art director (1924–1984)

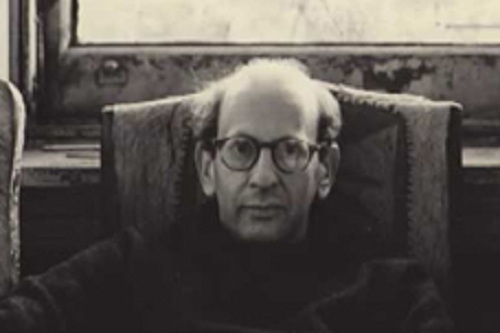
- Born: July 3, 1924; Syracuse, New York, US
- Died: May 7, 1984 (aged 59); Dallas, Texas, US
- Known for: Art director, painter, teacher

Marvin Israel (July 3, 1924 – May 7, 1984) was an American artist, photographer, painter, teacher and art director from New York City known for modern/surreal interiors, abstract imagery. Israel created sinister shadowy and exuberant interiors with implications of violence that were often sexual in nature.

== Life and career ==
Marvin Israel was born in Syracuse, New York, the son of Bessie and Harry Israel. In 1950, Israel was a graduate student at Syracuse University and spent two years in Paris studying and painting.

In 1952, he had his first one-man show at galerie Arnaud, Paris, France.

In November 1953 he participated in a collective exhibition at galerie Suzanne Michel, in Paris, with Nina-Negri, Gilbert Besançon, Robert Fontené, Henri Olive-Tamari, Michel Leroy and Lempereur-Haut.

The start of his photographic period was in 1953; he studied design with Alexey Brodovitch.

In 1955 he got his Masters of Fine Arts in graphic design from Yale; became art director for Seventeen Magazine.

In 1956 he photographed Elvis.

In 1960, Israel left photography as his main medium to concentrate on drawing in charcoal, pastel and ink.

From 1961 to 1963 he was art director for Harper's Bazaar where he featured Richard Avedon, along with artists such as Diane Arbus, Robert Frank, Lee Friedlander, Larry Rivers, Andy Warhol and established masters such as Henri Cartier-Bresson and Walker Evans. From 1957 to 1963 he worked as a freelance art director for Atlantic Records, with occasional engagements thereafter. In 1963 he taught painting and design in New York City at Parsons School of Design, Cooper Union and at the Rhode Island School of Design In 1966 he had his first one-man show at Cordier and Elkstron Gallery in NYC. In 1967, he became art director for Mademoiselle Magazine. In 1970, he designed Richard Avedon's photo exhibition at the Minneapolis Institute of Arts.

Israel was married to Cuban-born New York sculptor and ceramicist Margaret Ponce Israel. They maintained a two-story cupola studio/living space on top of a New York City skyscraper. In addition to the American artists and photographers with whom he worked, Israel was widely known among and friendly with such photographers and artists as Lisette Model, Mary Frank, Peter Beard, Saul Leiter and Garry Winogrand.

In 1972, he appeared as himself in the documentary film, Going Where I've Never Been: The Photography of Diane Arbus.

In 1978, he had a retrospective exhibition at the Brusberg Gallery in Hanover, West Germany.

In May 1984 while in Dallas, Texas, working on Richard Avedon's exhibition, "In the American West," Israel had a heart attack and died.

In 1986, a retrospective of Israel's art was held at Parson's School of Design. In 1991, a retrospective was held at Twining Gallery in NYC.
