= Billboard Top R&B Records of 1954 =

American music chart

Billboard Top R&B Records of 1954 is made up of two year-end charts compiled by Billboard magazine ranking the year's top rhythm and blues records based on record sales and juke box plays.

Retail year-end	Juke box year-end	Title	Artist(s)	Label
1	2	"Work with Me, Annie"	The Midnighters	Federal
2	1	"Honey Love"	The Drifters	Atlantic
3	4	"Oh What a Dream"	Ruth Brown	Atlantic
4	6	"You'll Never Walk Alone"	Roy Hamilton	Epic
5	3	"Shake, Rattle and Roll"	Big Joe Turner	Atlantic
6	8	"The Things That I Used to Do"	Guitar Slim	Specialty
7	7	"It Hurts Me to My Heart"	Faye Adams	Herald
8	10	"Annie Had a Baby"	The Midnighters	Federal
9	11	"Lovey Dovey"	The Clovers	Atlantic
10	9	"Sexy Ways"	The Midnighters	Federal
11	24	"Money, Honey"	The Drifters	Atlantic
12	5	"Sh-Boom"	The Chords	Cat
13	17	"I Didn't Want to Do It"	The Spiders	Imperial
14	NR	"I'll Be There"	Faye Adams	Herald
15	NR	"Honey Hush"	Big Joe Turner	Atlantic
16	12	"Just Make Love to Me"	Muddy Waters	Chess
17	NR	"Little Mama"	The Clovers	Atlantic
18	13	"Such a Night	The Drifters	Atlantic
19	NR	"You're Still My Baby"	Chuck Willis	Okeh
20	15	"Goodnight, Sweetheart, Goodnight"	The Spaniels	Vee Jay
21	20	"Ebb Tide"	Roy Hamilton	Epic
22	28	"I Don't Hurt Anymore"	Dinah Washington	Mercury
23	21	"Saving My Love for You"	Johnny Ace	Duke
24	NR	"Mambo Baby"	Ruth Brown	Atlantic
25	NR	"Hearts of Stone"	The Charms	Deluxe
26	NR	"I've Got My Eyes on You"	The Clovers	Atlantic
27	29	"You're So Fine"	Little Walter	Checker
28	14	"Gee"	The Crows	Rama
29	NR	"I'm Just Your Fool"	Buddy Johnson	Mercury
30	23	"If I Loved You"	Roy Hamilton	Epic
NR	16	"Your Cash Ain't Nothin' But Trash"	The Clovers	Atlantic
NR	18	"I'll Be True"	Faye Adams	Herald
NR	19	"I Understand (Just How You Feel)"	The Four Tunes	Jubilee
NR	22	"You Upset Me, Baby"	B.B. King	RPM
NR	25	"I'm Your Hoochie Coochie Man"	Muddy Waters	Chess
NR	26	"I'm Ready"	Muddy Waters	Chess
NR	27	"Marie"	The Four Tunes	Jubilee
NR	30	"You Better Watch Yourself"	Little Walter	Checker

== See also ==
- List of Billboard number-one R&B songs of 1954
- Billboard year-end top 30 singles of 1954
- 1954 in music
