= 1954 in music =

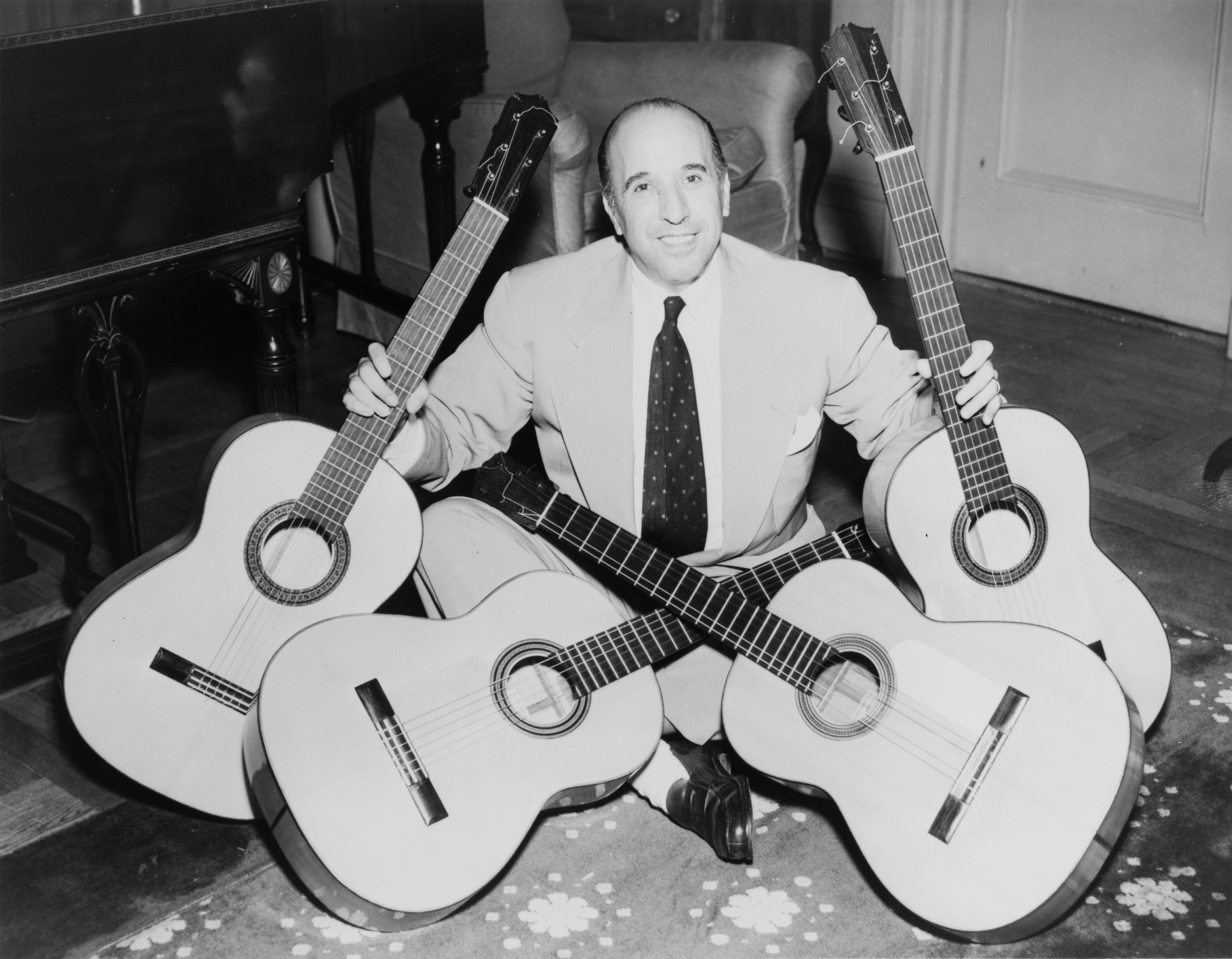
Flamenco guitarist Carlos Montoya in 1954

This is a list of notable events in music that took place in the year 1954.

== Specific locations ==
- 1954 in British music
- 1954 in Norwegian music

== Specific genres ==
- 1954 in country music
- 1954 in jazz

== Events ==
- January 14 – First documented use of the abbreviated term "Rock 'n' Roll" to promote Alan Freed's Rock 'n' Roll Jubillee, held at St. Nicholas Arena in New York City. Previously the genre term was just called "Rock and Roll".
- February 1 – Johnny "Guitar" Watson records "Space Guitar" pioneering reverb and feedback techniques on guitar.
- March 12 – Arnold Schoenberg's opera Moses und Aron has its first performance in Hamburg (it is given a staged première on June 6 in Zürich).
- March 15 – The Chords record "Sh-Boom" for Atlantic Records' Cat subsidiary.
- March 25 – At the 26th Academy Awards, Frank Sinatra wins the Academy Award for Best Supporting Actor for his role in From Here to Eternity, resuscitating his singing career in the process. At the same ceremony, Bing Crosby is nominated for Best Actor for his role in The Country Girl.
- April – Fender Stratocaster electric guitar first produced in California.
- April 12 – Bill Haley & His Comets record "Rock Around the Clock" in New York City for Decca Records.
- May 5 – The seventeenth Maggio Musicale Fiorentino opens with a performance of Gaspare Spontini's last opera, Agnese di Hohenstaufen, and continues until 20 June, featuring operas by Weber, Adriano Lualdi, Puccini, and Tchaikovsky, as well as the world premiere of Valentino Bucchi's Il contrabasso.
- May 20 – "Rock Around the Clock" is released as the B-side of "Thirteen Women (and Only One Man in Town)". The song is only a moderate success (US # 23 on May 29, 1954, for only one week; UK # 17, in December 1954) until it is featured in the film Blackboard Jungle the following year.
- July 5 – Elvis Presley has his first commercial recording session at Sun Studios in Memphis, Tennessee. He sings "That's All Right (Mama)" and "Blue Moon of Kentucky", released as his first single on July 19 naming the performers as Elvis Presley, Scotty and Bill. The songs were originally sung by Arthur Crudup in 1946 and Bill Monroe and the Blue Grass Boys in 1947 respectively.
- October 16 – Elvis Presley makes his first radio broadcast, on a show in Shreveport, Louisiana, called Louisiana Hayride.
- October 29 -- John Serry signs with Ben Selvin at RCA Thesaurus to broadcast his arrangements of popular music on national radio networks.
- Fall – A cover version of Big Joe Turner's "Shake, Rattle and Roll" by Bill Haley & His Comets becomes the first internationally popular rock and roll recording.
- Record companies deliver 7-inch 45 rpm record singles to radio stations instead of 78s.
- Lyric Opera of Chicago is founded.
- Composer/conductor Andrzej Panufnik defects from Poland to England.
- Les Paul commissions Ampex to build the first eight track tape recorder, at his own expense.
- The Drifters form.
- The Isley Brothers make their first recordings, featuring only the three eldest brothers, O'Kelly Jr., Rudolph and Ronald.
- The Newport Jazz Festival is established by George Wein.
- São Paulo State Symphony Orchestra is founded.

== Albums released ==
- Al Haig Trio (Esoteric) – Al Haig
- Bing: A Musical Autobiography – Bing Crosby
- Blue Haze – Miles Davis
- Chet Baker Sings - Chet Baker
- The Chordettes Sing Your Requests – The Chordettes
- Clap Yo' Hands – The Four Lads
- Crew Cut Capers – The Crew-Cuts
- Dinah Jams – Dinah Washington
- Irving Berlin Favorites – Eddie Fisher
- Irving Berlin's White Christmas – Rosemary Clooney
- Jacques Brel et ses chansons – Jacques Brel
- Just Patti – Patti Page
- Louis Armstrong and the Mills Brothers – Louis Armstrong & The Mills Brothers
- Louis Armstrong Plays W.C. Handy – Louis Armstrong and His All Stars
- Mambo! - Yma Súmac
- The Man That Got Away – Georgia Gibbs
- Meet The Mills Brothers – The Mills Brothers
- Mr. Rhythm – Frankie Laine
- My Heart's In The Highland – Jo Stafford
- A Night at Birdland Vol. 1 – The Art Blakey Quintet
- A Night at Birdland Vol. 2 – The Art Blakey Quintet
- Old Masters – Bing Crosby
- Patti Page Sings for Romance – Patti Page
- Patti's Songs – Patti Page
- RCA Thesaurus – John Serry, Sr.
- Red Garters – Rosemary Clooney
- Selections from Irving Berlin's White Christmas – Bing Crosby, Danny Kaye, Trudy Stevens, Peggy Lee
- So Many Memories – Patti Page
- Some Fine Old Chestnuts – Bing Crosby
- Something Cool – June Christy
- Songs for Young Lovers – Frank Sinatra
- Songs in a Mellow Mood – Ella Fitzgerald
- Swing Easy! – Frank Sinatra
- The Tin Angel – Odetta & Larry
- Toshiko at Mocambo – Toshiko Akiyoshi
- Toshiko's Piano – Toshiko Akiyoshi
- Young at Heart – Doris Day & Frank Sinatra

== Biggest hit singles ==
The following singles achieved the highest chart positions in the set of charts available for 1954.

#	Artist	Title	Year	Country	Chart entries
1	The Chordettes	"Mr. Sandman"	1954	US	US Billboard 1 – Oct 1954 (20 weeks), US 1940s 1 – Nov 1954 (8 weeks), US 1 for 4 weeks – Dec 1954, US CashBox 1 – Oct 1954 (23 weeks), Radio Luxembourg sheet music 1 for 6 weeks – Jan 1955, Australia 1 for 4 weeks – Apr 1955, Grammy Hall of Fame in 2002 (1954), Peel list 1 of 1954, US BB 5 of 1954, DZE 5 of 1954, Your Hit Parade 6 of 1954, POP 7 of 1954, RYM 9 of 1954, UK 11 – Dec 1954 (8 weeks), Brazil 27 of 1955, DDD 45 of 1954, RIAA 252, Acclaimed 1006 (1954)
2	Doris Day	"Secret Love"	1954	US	UK 1 – Apr 1954 (29 weeks), US Billboard 1 – Jan 1954 (22 weeks), US 1940s 1 – Jan 1954 (20 weeks), US 1 for 3 weeks – Feb 1954, US CashBox 1 – Nov 1953 (30 weeks), Radio Luxembourg sheet music 1 for 7 weeks – May 1954, Oscar in 1953 (film 'Calamity Jane'), Grammy Hall of Fame in 1999 (1953), UKMIX 7, DZE 8 of 1954, US BB 11 of 1954, POP 11 of 1954, Your Hit Parade 12 of 1954, RYM 12 of 1953, Brazil 17 of 1954, Italy 54 of 1954
3	The Crew-Cuts	"Sh-Boom"	1954	US	US Billboard 1 – Jul 1954 (20 weeks), US 1940s 1 – Jul 1954 (20 weeks), US 1 for 7 weeks – Aug 1954, US CashBox 1 – Jul 1954 (24 weeks), Australia 1 for 4 weeks – Dec 1954, DZE 1 of 1954, US BB 3 of 1954, Flanders 3 – Dec 1954 (3 months), POP 3 of 1954, UK 12 – Oct 1954 (9 weeks), Brazil 13 of 1954, France (50s) 20 of 1954, RYM 22 of 1954, Italy 95 of 1955
4	Kitty Kallen	"Little Things Mean a Lot"	1954	US	UK 1 – Jul 1954 (23 weeks), US Billboard 1 – Apr 1954 (26 weeks), US 1940s 1 – Apr 1954 (25 weeks), US 1 for 9 weeks – Jun 1954, US CashBox 1 – Apr 1954 (28 weeks), Radio Luxembourg sheet music 1 for 12 weeks – Jul 1954, Australia 1 for 5 weeks – Oct 1954, DZE 2 of 1954, Your Hit Parade 9 of 1954, US BB 15 of 1954, POP 15 of 1954, UKMIX 28, RYM 145 of 1954
5	Rosemary Clooney	"Hey There"	1954	US	US Billboard 1 – Jul 1954 (27 weeks), US 1940s 1 – Jul 1954 (23 weeks), US 1 for 6 weeks – Sep 1954, US CashBox 1 – Jul 1954 (31 weeks), Australia 1 for 4 weeks – Feb 1957, Grammy Hall of Fame in 1999 (1954), UK 4 – Oct 1955 (11 weeks), DZE 7 of 1954, Your Hit Parade 14 of 1954, US BB 18 of 1954, POP 21 of 1954, Brazil 31 of 1954, RYM 34 of 1954, DDD 66 of 1954

== US No. 1 hit singles ==
These singles reached the top of US Billboard magazine's charts in 1954.

First week	Number of weeks	Title	Artist
January 2, 1954	8	"Oh! My Pa-Pa"	Eddie Fisher
February 27, 1954	2	"Secret Love"	Doris Day
March 13, 1954	1	"Make Love to Me"	Jo Stafford
March 20, 1954	1	"Secret Love"	Doris Day
March 27, 1954	2	"Make Love to Me"	Jo Stafford
April 10, 1954	8	"Wanted"	Perry Como
June 5, 1954	9	"Little Things Mean a Lot"	Kitty Kallen
August 7, 1954	7	"Sh-Boom"	The Crew-Cuts
September 25, 1954	6	"Hey There"	Rosemary Clooney
November 6, 1954	1	"This Ole House"	Rosemary Clooney
November 13, 1954	3	"I Need You Now"	Eddie Fisher
December 4, 1954	7	"Mr. Sandman"	The Chordettes

== Top hits on record ==
=== A–J ===
- "Am I a Toy or a Treasure" – Kay Starr
- "Answer Me, My Love" – Nat King Cole
- "Back Where I Belong" – Frankie Laine and Jo Stafford
- "Baubles, Bangles & Beads" – Georgia Gibbs
- "Baubles, Bangles & Beads" – Peggy Lee
- "The Christmas Song" – Nat King Cole (a new version; original release was in 1946)
- "Cross Over The Bridge" – Patti Page
- "Darling, Je Vous Aime Beaucoup" – Nat King Cole
- "Earth Angel" – The Penguins (also in 1955)
- "Ebb Tide" – Roy Hamilton
- "Goodnight, Sweetheart, Goodnight" – The McGuire Sisters
- "Hearts Of Stone" – The Fontane Sisters
- "I Cried" – Patti Page
- "I Need You Now" – Eddie Fisher
- "I Speak to the Stars" – Doris Day
- "If I Give My Heart to You" – Doris Day
- "If You Love Me (Really Love Me)" – Kay Starr
- "In the Chapel in the Moonlight" – Kitty Kallen
- "In the Beginning" – Frankie Laine
- "In The Mood" – Glenn Miller
- "In the Still of the Night" – The Five Satins
- "Johnny Guitar" – Peggy Lee

=== L–S ===
- "Let Me Go, Lover" – Joan Weber
- "Little Things Mean a Lot" – Kitty Kallen
- "Lucille" - Clyde McPhatter and The Drifters
- "Make Love to Me" – Jo Stafford
- "The Man That Got Away" – Georgia Gibbs
- "Melancholy Baby" – Georgia Gibbs
- "Melody of Love" – Frank Sinatra and Ray Anthony
- "Mr. Sandman" – Chordettes
- "Muskrat Ramble" – Matys Brothers
- "My Sin" – Georgia Gibbs
- "Mystery Train" – Elvis Presley
- "Oh! My Pa-Pa" – Eddie Fisher
- "Opus One" – The Mills Brothers
- "Out Of Nowhere" – Frankie Laine
- "Papa Loves Mambo" – Perry Como
- "Rain, Rain, Rain" – Frankie Laine and The Four Lads
- "Say Hey" – Ray Anthony
- "Say Hey" – The Treniers
- "Secret Love" – Doris Day
- "Sh-Boom" – The Chords
- "Sincerely" – McGuire Sisters (also in 1955)
- "Smile" – Nat King Cole
- "Someone to Watch Over Me" – Frank Sinatra
- "Such a Night" – Clyde McPhatter and The Drifters
- "Such a Night" – Johnnie Ray
- "Sway" – Dean Martin

=== T–Y ===
- "Teach Me Tonight" – The DeCastro Sisters
- "Tenderly" – Nat King Cole
- "Thank You for Calling" – Jo Stafford
- "That's All Right Mama" – Elvis Presley
- "Tweedlee Dee" – LaVern Baker (also in 1955)
- "Wanted" – Perry Como
- "What a Dream" – Patti Page
- "When The World Was Young" – Felicia Sanders
- "Whither Thou Goest" – Les Paul and Mary Ford
- "You'll Never Walk Alone" – Roy Hamilton
- "You're Nobody till Somebody Loves You" – The Mills Brothers

== Top R&B and country hits on record ==
- "Bimbo" – Jim Reeves
- "Goodnight Sweetheart Goodnight" – Spaniels
- 'Slowly" – Webb Pierce
- "Hearts Of Stone" – Jewels
- "I'm Your Hoochie Coochie Man" – Muddy Waters
- "Mambo Baby" – Ruth Brown
- "Oh What A Dream" – Ruth Brown
- "Shake A Hand" – Faye Adams
- "Shake Rattle And Roll" – Big Joe Turner
- "I Don't Hurt Anymore" – Hank Snow
- "The Things That I Used To Do" – Guitar Slim
- "Tweedlee Dee" – LaVern Baker
- "Work with Me, Annie" – Hank Ballard & The Midnighters

== Published popular music ==
- "All of You" words and music: Cole Porter
- "Annie Had a Baby" w.m. Henry Glover & Lois Mann
- "A Blossom Fell" w.m. Howard Barnes, Harold Cornelius & Dominic John
- "Cara Mia" w.m. Tulio Trapani & Lee Lange
- "Cherry Pink And Apple Blossom White" w. (Eng) Mack David (Fr) Jacques Larue m. Louiguy
- "Count Your Blessings (Instead of Sheep)" w.m. Irving Berlin
- "Cross Over The Bridge" w.m. Bennie Benjamin & George David Weiss
- "Earth Angel" w.m. Jesse Belvin, Curtis Williams & Gaynel Hodge
- "Ev'ry Day of My Life" w.m.Al Jacobs and Jimmie Crane.
- "The Finger Of Suspicion Points At You" w.m. Paul Mann & Al Lewis
- "From The Vine Came The Grape" w.m. Leonard Whitcup & Paul Cunningham
- "Gilly Gilly Ossenfeffer Katzenellen Bogen by the Sea" w.m. Al Hoffman & Dick Manning
- "Hearts Of Stone" w. Eddy Ray m. Rudy Jackson
- "Hernando's Hideaway" w.m. Richard Adler & Jerry Ross
- "He's A Tramp" Sonny Burke, Peggy Lee
- "Hey There" w.m. Richard Adler & Jerry Ross
- "The High and the Mighty" w. Ned Washington m. Dimitri Tiomkin
- "Honeycomb" w.m. Bob Merrill
- "I Can't Tell A Waltz From A Tango" Al Hoffman, Dick Manning
- "I Could Be Happy With You" w.m. Sandy Wilson
- "I Don't Hurt Anymore" w. Jack Rollins m. Don Robertson
- "I Got A Woman" w.m. Ray Charles & Renald Richard
- "I Left My Heart In San Francisco" w. Douglas Cross m. George Cory
- "If I Give My Heart to You" w.m. Jimmy Brewster, Jimmie Crane & Al Jacobs
- "I'll Walk With God" w. Paul Francis Webster m. Nicholas Brodszky
- "I'm Not At All In Love" w.m. Richard Adler & Jerry Ross. Introduced by Janis Paige in the musical The Pajama Game.
- "In Other Words" (aka "Fly Me To The Moon") w.m. Bart Howard
- "Let Me Go, Lover!" w.m. Jenny Lou Carson & Al Hill
- "The Little Shoemaker" w.(Eng) John Turner & Geoffrey Parsons (Fr) Avril Lamarque m. Rudi Revil
- "Mambo Italiano" w.m. Bob Merrill
- "Mister Sandman" w.m. Pat Ballard
- "Misty" w. Johnny Burke m. Erroll Garner
- "My Son, My Son" w. Bob Howard m. Melville Farley & Eddie Calvert
- "The Naughty Lady of Shady Lane" w.m. Sid Tepper & Roy C. Bennett
- "Only You (and You Alone)" w.m. Buck Ram & Ande Rand
- "Open Up Your Heart (And Let the Sunshine In)" w.m. Stuart Hamblen
- "Papa Loves Mambo" w.m. Al Hoffman, Dick Manning & Bix Reichner
- "Pledging My Love" w.m. Ferdinand Washington & Don Robey
- "The Poor People of Paris" w.(Eng) Jack Lawrence (Fr) Rene Rouzaud m. Marguerite Monnot "La Goulante du Pauvre Jean"
- "Release Me" w.m. Eddie Miller & W. S. Stevenson
- "River of No Return" w. Ken Darby m. Lionel Newman from the film River of No Return.
- "Shake, Rattle And Roll" w.m. Charles Calhoun
- "Sh-Boom" w.m. James Keyes, Claude & Carl Feaster, Floyd F. McRae & William Edwards
- "Sincerely" w.m. Harvey Fuqua & Alan Freed
- "Sisters" w.m. Irving Berlin
- "Skokiaan" w. Tom Glazer m. August Musarurwa
- "Smile" w. John Turner & Geoffrey Parsons m. Charles Chaplin
- "Steam Heat" w.m. Richard Adler & Jerry Ross
- "There Once Was a Man" w. m. Richard Adler & Jerry Ross. Introduced by John Raitt and Janis Paige in the musical The Pajama Game
- "This Ole House" w.m. Stuart Hamblen
- "Three Coins In The Fountain" w. Sammy Cahn m. Jule Styne
- "Tweedle Dee" w.m. Winfield Scott
- "What a Dream" w.m. Chuck Willis
- "Whither Thou Goest" w.m. Guy Singer
- "Wonderful, Wonderful Day" w. Johnny Mercer m. Gene De Paul from the film Seven Brides for Seven Brothers
- "Work with Me, Annie" w.m. Hank Ballard
- "Young And Foolish" w. Arnold B. Horwitt m. Albert Hague from the 1955 musical Plain and Fancy

== Other notable songs ==
- "Le Déserteur" – Boris Vian
- Tierra bendita y divina – a traditional Spanish language Christian hymn is published.
- "V Put" – Vasili Solovyov-Sedoy and Mikhail Dudin

== Classical music ==
=== Premieres ===
Sortable table
Composer	Composition	Date	Location	Performers
Brian, Havergal	Symphony No. 8 (1949)	1954-02-01	London	London Philharmonic – Boult
Chávez, Carlos	Symphony No. 3	1954-12-09	Caracas, Venezuela	Venezuela Symphony – Chávez
Dohnányi, Ernő	American Rhapsody	1954-02-21	Athens, Ohio	? – Dohnányi
Enescu, George	String Quartet No. 2, Op. 22, No. 2	1954-02-07	Boston	Stradivarius Quartet
Goeyvaerts, Karel	Nummer 5	1954-10-19	Cologne (Musik der Zeit)	electronic music
Jolivet, André	Symphony No. 1	1954-05-30	Haifa, Israel (ISCM Festival)	[unknown orchestra and conductor]
Korngold, Erich W.	Symphony	1954-10-17	Vienna	Vienna Symphony – Harold Byrns^{1}
Lutosławski, Witold	Concerto for Orchestra	1954-11-26	Warsaw	Warsaw Philharmonic – Rowicki
Persichetti, Vincent	Symphony No. 4	1954-12-17	Philadelphia	Philadelphia Orchestra – Ormandy
Rubbra, Edmund	Symphony No. 6	1954-11-17	London	BBC Symphony – Sargent
Shchedrin, Rodion	Piano Concerto No. 1	1954-11-07	Moscow	Shchedrin / Moscow Conservatory Symphony – Rozhdestvensky
Shostakovich, Dmitri	Festive Overture	1954-11-06	Moscow	Bolshoi Orchestra – Nebolsin
Stockhausen, Karlheinz	Klavierstücke I–V	1954-08-21	Darmstädter Ferienkurse, Germany	Mercenier
Karlheinz Stockhausen	Studie I + Studie II	1954-10-19	Cologne (Musik der Zeit)	electronic music
Stravinsky, Igor	In memoriam Dylan Thomas	1954-09-20	Los Angeles (Monday Evening Concerts)	Robinson, Baker, Babitz, Figelski, Neikrug, Bohannon, Howard, Ulyate, Zeldin – Craft
Thomson, Virgil	Concerto for Flute, Strings, Harp and Percussion	1954-09-17	Venice Biennale	La Fenice Philharmonic – Sanzogno
Varèse, Edgard	Déserts	1954-12-02	Paris	Henry / French Radio National Orchestra – Scherchen
Vaughan Williams, Ralph	Tuba Concerto	1954-06-13	London	Catelinet / London Symphony – Barbirolli
Villa-Lobos, Heitor	Odisseia de uma raça, symphonic poem	1954-05-30	Haifa, Israel (ISCM Festival)	Israel Philharmonic – Taube
Villa-Lobos, Heitor	Rudá (Dio d'amore), symphonic poem and ballet	1954-08-30	Paris	French Radio National Orchestra – Villa-Lobos
Villa-Lobos, Heitor	String Quartet No. 14	1954-08-11	Ann Arbor, US	Stanley Quartet

- ^{1} Recording for the Austrian Radio. The Symphony received its two first concert performances in 1955 under Alois Melichar in Graz and Jan Koetsier in Munich.

=== Compositions ===
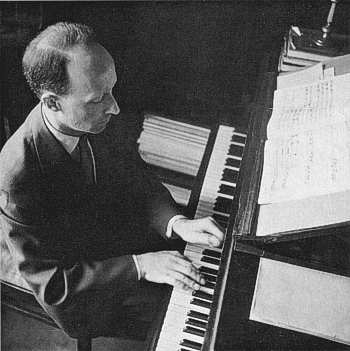
Witold Lutosławski in 1952/53; the Concerto for Orchestra launched his international career

- William Alwyn – Autumn Legend for Cor Anglais and Strings
- Luciano Berio – Nones for orchestra
- Boris Blacher – Viola Concerto
- Havergal Brian – Symphony No. 10
- Carlos Chávez – Symphony No. 3
- George Crumb – String Quartet
- Mario Davidovsky – Concertino for Percussion and Strings
- George Enescu – Chamber Symphony in E major, Op. 33
- Ross Lee Finney – Piano Trio No. 2
- Gerald Finzi – Cello Concerto
- André Fleury – Messe pour la fête de tous les saints
- Armstrong Gibbs – Dale and Fell, suite for strings
- Howard Hanson – Sinfonia sacra (Symphony No. 5)
- Andrew Imbrie – Violin Concerto
- Alemdar Karamanov – Symphony No. 1
- Wojciech Kilar –
  - The Bird for voice and piano
  - Sonata for horn and piano
- Ernst Krenek
  - Symphony "Pallas Athene", Op. 137
  - Violin Concerto No. 2, Op. 140
- György Kurtág - Mouvement for viola and orchestra
- György Ligeti – Métamorphoses nocturnes (String Quartet No. 1)
- Witold Lutosławski
  - Concerto for Orchestra
  - Dance Preludes, for clarinet and piano
- Bohuslav Martinů – Sonata for Piano, H. 350
- Darius Milhaud – West Point Suite
- Per Nørgård - Metamorfosi
- Walter Piston – Symphony No. 5
- Edmund Rubbra – Symphony No. 6
- John Serry Sr. –
  - Allegro – m. Joseph Haydn, arranged for accordion quartet
  - The Golden Wedding – m. Jean Gabriel-Marie, arranged for accordion quartet
  - Tango of Love – arranged for accordion quartet
- Roger Sessions – Idyll of Theocritus
- Robert Simpson – String Quartet No. 3
- Karlheinz Stockhausen – Studie II
- Igor Stravinsky – In memoriam Dylan Thomas
- Virgil Thomson – Concerto for Flute, Strings, Harp and Percussion
- Ernst Toch – String Quartet No. 13
- Henri Tomasi – Horn Concerto
- Eduard Tubin – Symphony No. 6
- Edgard Varèse – Déserts
- Ralph Vaughan Williams
  - Sonata in A Minor for Violin and Piano
  - Tuba Concerto
- Heitor Villa-Lobos – String Quartet No. 15
- Stefan Wolpe
  - Symphony for 24 Instruments
  - Piece for Oboe, Cello, Percussion and Piano, "Oboe Quartet"
- Iannis Xenakis - Metastaseis
- Bernd Alois Zimmermann - Nobody knows the trouble I see Concert for trumpet and chamber orchestra

== Opera ==
- Jack Beeson – Hello, Out There
- Benjamin Britten – The Turn of the Screw
- Valentino Bucchi – Il contrabasso (Maggio Musicale Fiorentino, 20 June)
- Aaron Copland – The Tender Land
- Paul Hindemith – Neues vom Tage, revised version of 1929 opera
- Bohuslav Martinů – Mirandolina
- Jerome Moross – The Golden Apple
- William Walton – Troilus and Cressida

== Film ==
- Leonard Bernstein - On the Waterfront
- Bernard Herrmann & Alfred Newman - The Egyptian
- Akira Ifukube - Godzilla
- Nino Rota - La Strada
- Max Steiner - The Caine Mutiny
- Dimitri Tiomkin - Dial M for Murder
- Dimitri Tiomkin - The High and the Mighty
- Franz Waxman - Rear Window
- Victor Young - Johnny Guitar

== Musical theater ==
- After the Ball (Music, Lyrics and Book: Noël Coward) London production opened at the Globe Theatre on June 10 and ran for 188 performances
- The Boy Friend Broadway production opened at the Royale Theatre on September 30 and ran for 485 performances
- By the Beautiful Sea (Music: Arthur Schwartz Lyrics: Dorothy Fields) Broadway production opened at the Majestic Theatre on April 8 and transferred to the Imperial Theatre on October 2 for a total run of 268 performances. Starring Shirley Booth
- Can-Can London production opened at the Coliseum on October 14 and ran for 394 performances
- The Duenna ( Music: Julian Slade Lyrics & Book: Dorothy Reynolds) London production opened at the Westminster Theatre on July 28 and ran for 134 performances
- Fanny Broadway production opened at the Majestic Theatre on November 4 and transferred to the Belasco Theatre on December 4, 1956, for a total run of 888 performances
- The Girl in Pink Tights Broadway production opened at the Mark Hellinger Theatre on March 5 and ran for 115 performances
- The Golden Apple Broadway production opened at the Alvin Theatre on April 20 and ran for 125 performances
- Happy Holiday (Music: George Posford Lyrics & Book: Eric Maschwitz and Arnold Ridley) London production opened at the Palace Theatre on December 22 and ran for 31 performances
- House of Flowers Broadway production opened at the Alvin Theatre on December 30 and ran for 165 performances
- On Your Toes Broadway revival opened at the 46th Street Theatre on October 11 and ran for 64 performances
- The Pajama Game (Richard Adler and Jerry Ross) — Broadway production opened at the St. James Theatre on May 13 and transferred to the Shubert Theatre on November 24, 1956, for a total run of 1063 performances
- Pal Joey (Music: Richard Rodgers Lyrics: Lorenz Hart Book: John O'Hara) London production opened at Princes Theatre on August 4 and ran for 245 performances
- Peter Pan Broadway production opened at the Winter Garden Theatre on October 20 and ran for 152 performances
- Salad Days (Music: Julian Slade Lyrics & Book: Dorothy Reynolds and Julian Slade) London production opened at the Vaudeville Theatre on August 5 and ran for 2283 performances
- You'll Be Lucky London revue opened at the Adelphi Theatre on February 25. Starring Sally Barnes and Lauri Lupino Lane.
- Zuleika — premiere in Cambridge, England

== Musical films ==
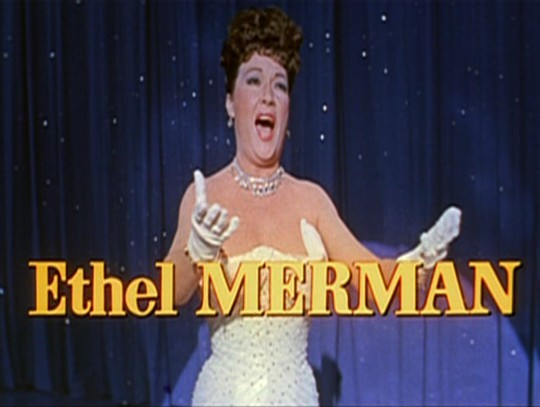
Ethel Merman sings the title number of the 1954 film There's No Business Like Show Business.

- Athena, starring Jane Powell, Debbie Reynolds, Edmund Purdom and Vic Damone
- Brigadoon
- Carmen Jones
- Casanova's Big Night starring Bob Hope
- Chandraharam, starring N.T. Rama Rao
- Deep in My Heart, starring José Ferrer
- French Cancan, starring Jean Gabin and María Félix
- The French Line, starring Jane Russell
- Living It Up, starring Dean Martin, Jerry Lewis and Janet Leigh
- Lucky Me, starring Doris Day, Robert Cummings and Phil Silvers
- Mayurpankh, directed by and starring Kishore Sahu
- New Faces
- Red Garters, starring Rosemary Clooney, Jack Carson and Guy Mitchell
- Rhapsody, starring Elizabeth Taylor
- River of No Return, starring Marilyn Monroe
- Rose Marie, starring Ann Blyth and Howard Keel
- Seven Brides for Seven Brothers, starring Jane Powell, Howard Keel and Julie Newmar.
- A Star Is Born
- The Student Prince, starring Ann Blyth and Edmund Purdom with Mario Lanza dubbing for Purdom.
- There's No Business Like Show Business
- Top Banana (film), starring Phil Silvers
- White Christmas, starring Bing Crosby, Danny Kaye, Rosemary Clooney and Vera Ellen

== Musical television ==
- Babes in Toyland
- Lady in the Dark (starring Ann Sothern)

== Births ==
=== January–April ===
- January 1 – Richard Edson, American drummer
- January 2 – Glenn Goins, American R&B/funk guitarist and singer (Parliament-Funkadelic) (died 1978)
- January 4 – Eugene Chadbourne, American guitarist and songwriter
- January 7 – José María Vitier, Cuban pianist and composer
- January 13 – Trevor Rabin, rock guitarist and vocalist (Yes) and film composer
- January 16 – Cheryl Bentyne, vocalist (The Manhattan Transfer)
- January 19 – Katey Sagal, American singer-songwriter and actress
- January 25 – Richard Finch, funk composer (K.C. and the Sunshine Band)
- January 29 – Richard Manitoba, singer
- February 1 – Chuck Dukowski, American singer-songwriter and bass player (Black Flag, Würm, Black Face and October Faction)
- February 10 – Carita Holmström, pianist, singer and songwriter
- February 18 – John Travolta, actor, singer and dancer
- February 19 – Jimmy Pursey, vocalist (Sham 69)
- February 20 – Jon Brant, bass guitar player (Cheap Trick)
- February 27 –
  - JoAnn Falletta, orchestral conductor
  - Neal Schon, rock musician (Journey) Santana
- March 2 – Hunt Sales, American drummer (Tin Machine)
- March 3 -
  - Chris Hughes, british producer and drummer (Adam and the Ants)
  - John Lilley, American singer/songwriter and guitarist (The Hooters)
- March 10 – Tina Charles, disco singer
- March 16 – Nancy Wilson, rock singer-songwriter (Heart)
- March 27 – Wally Stocker, rock guitarist (The Babys)
- March 31 – Tony Brock, rock drummer (The Babys)
- April 1 – Knut Værnes, Norwegian guitarist
- April 2 – Susumu Hirasawa, singer-songwriter, guitarist and keyboardist (P-MODEL)
- April 4 – Michel Camilo, pianist
- April 5 – Peter Case, singer-songwriter and guitarist,
- April 7 – Jackie Chan, Hong Kong martial artist
- April 13 – Jimmy Destri, rock keyboard player and songwriter (Blondie)
- April 17 – Michael Sembello, singer, instrumentalist and songwriter
- April 22 – Regina, American singer and songwriter
- April 28 – Michael Daugherty, composer

=== May–December ===
- May 1 – Ray Parker Jr., guitarist, songwriter and record producer
- May 2 –
  - Angela Bofill, singer songwriter
  - Elliot Goldenthal, composer
- May 10 – Barrington Pheloung, screen composer (died 2019)
- May 11 – Judith Weir, composer, Master of the Queens Music
- May 13 – Johnny Logan, Australian-Irish singer
- May 18 – Reinhold Heil, composer
- May 20 – Jimmie "Soybean" Henderson, rock guitarist (Black Oak Arkansas) (died 2016)
- May 21 – Marc Ribot, session guitarist and composer
- May 31 – Vicki Sue Robinson, US disco singer (died 2000)
- June 3 – Dan Hill, singer-songwriter
- June 8 – Greg Ginn, punk guitarist (Black Flag)
- June 13 – Robert Donaldson (Bo Donaldson & the Heywoods)
- June 14 – Gianna Nannini, Italian rock musician
- June 15 – Terri Gibbs, country singer
- June 20 – Michael Anthony, hard rock bassist (Van Halen)
- July 7 –
  - Pam Bricker, American singer and guitarist (died 2005)
  - Ron Jones, composer
- July 10 – Neil Tennant, British singer-songwriter and record producer (Pet Shop Boys)
- July 18 –
  - Tobias Picker, American composer
  - Ricky Skaggs, American singer-songwriter, mandolin player and producer (New South)
- August 11 – Joe Jackson, singer-songwriter and composer
- August 17 – Eric Johnson, guitarist, songwriter and record producer
- August 25 – Elvis Costello, singer-songwriter
- September 7 – Sergio Rendine, Italian composer (died 2023)
- September 14 – Barry Cowsill, drummer/bassist with family harmony group The Cowsills (died 2005)
- September 17 – Joël-François Durand, French composer
- September 21 – Phil Taylor, English heavy metal drummer (Motörhead) (died 2015)
- September 28 – George Lynch, American heavy metal guitarist (Dokken)
- September 30 –
  - Basia, Polish singer
  - Patrice Rushen, American pianist, singer and composer
- October 3 – Stevie Ray Vaughan, guitarist and singer-songwriter (died 1990)
- October 3 – Dawayne Bailey, guitarist and singer-songwriter (alias Bob Seger-Chicago)
- October 9 – James Fearnley, folk punk accordionist (The Pogues)
- October 10 –
  - Susan Frykberg, electroacoustic composer and sound artist
  - David Lee Roth (Van Halen)
- October 12 – Michael Roe, guitarist, lead singer of The 77s
- October 24 – Amadou Bagayoko, worldbeat guitarist and singer (died 2025)
- November 3 – Adam Ant, singer
- November 4 – Chris Difford, singer, songwriter and record producer (Squeeze)
- November 9 – Dennis Stratton, heavy metal guitarist (Iron Maiden)
- November 10 – Mario Cipollina, rock bassist (Huey Lewis and the News)
- November 14 –
  - Anson Funderburgh, American guitarist and bandleader
  - Yanni, pianist, keyboardist and composer
- November 15 – Randy Thomas, American singer-songwriter, guitarist and producer (Sweet Comfort Band and Allies)
- November 16 – Donald Runnicles, conductor
- November 18 – John Parr, singer
- November 23 – Bruce Hornsby, pianist and singer-songwriter (Grateful Dead)
- December 11 – Jermaine Jackson, singer (The Jackson 5)
- December 18 – Ray Liotta, American actor (d. 2022)
- December 16 – Spagna, Italian singer and songwriter
- December 25 –
  - Robin Campbell (UB40)
  - Annie Lennox, singer
- date unknown – Gérard Buquet, tubist, conductor and composer

== Deaths ==
- January 9 – Eugen Coca, violinist and composer, 60
- January 11 – Oscar Straus, Viennese operetta composer, 83
- January 21 – Per Reidarson, composer and music critic, 86
- March 3 – Noel Gay, English songwriter, 55
- March 11 – Frankie Newton, American trumpeter, 48
- March 19 – Walter Braunfels, pianist and composer, 71
- March 27 – Carl T. Fischer, composer and jazz pianist, 41
- April 5 – Claude Delvincourt, pianist and composer, 66
- April 8 – Edwin Grasse, violinist and composer, 69
- April 9 – Philip Greeley Clapp, pianist and composer, 65
- April 11 – Paul Specht, violinist and bandleader, 59
- April 14 – Lil Green, blues singer, 34 (pneumonia)
- April 17 – Torsten Ralf, operatic tenor, 53
- May 1 – Arthur Johnston, songwriter, 56
- May 19 – Charles Ives, composer, 79
- May 20 – Linda Lee Thomas, socialite and wife of Cole Porter, 70
- May 31 – Pedro Elías Gutiérrez, musician and composer, 84
- June 17 – Danny Cedrone, session guitarist (soloist on "Rock Around the Clock"), 33 (fell downstairs)
- July 7 – Idabelle Smith Firestone, American composer and songwriter, 79
- July 16 – Lucien Muratore, operatic tenor and actor, 77
- August 8 – Phil Ohman, film composer and pianist, 57
- August 13 – Demetrius Constantine Dounis, violin teacher
- August 17 – Billy Murray, singer, 77
- August 24 – Fred Rose, songwriter, music publisher, 56
- October 24 – Pepito Arriola, pianist, 57
- October 27 – Franco Alfano, composer and pianist, 79
- November 11 – J. Rosamond Johnson, composer and singer
- November 29 – Dink Johnson, jazz musician, 56
- November 30 – Wilhelm Furtwängler, conductor and composer, 68
- December 14
  - Papa Celestin, jazz musician, 70
  - Sergei Protopopov, Russian composer and music theorist, 61
- December 25
  - Johnny Ace, American rhythm and blues singer, 25 (shooting accident)
  - Rosario Scalero, violinist, teacher and composer, 84
