= List of Billboard number-one R&B songs of 1954 =

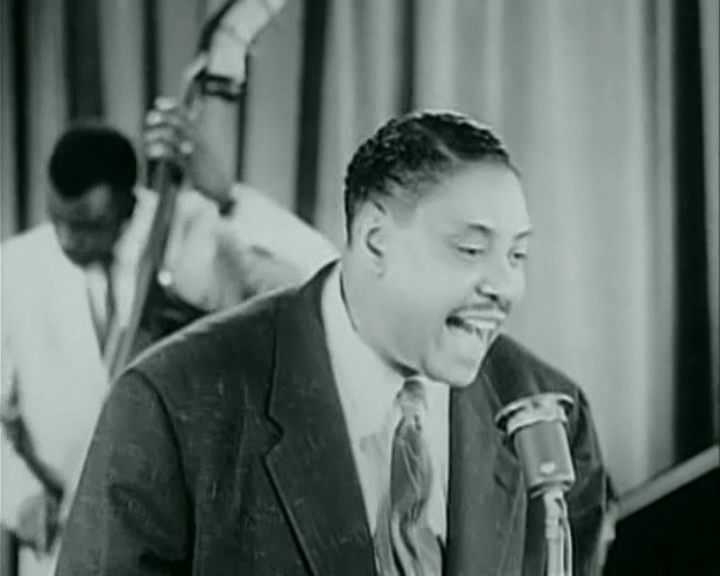
Big Joe Turner reached number one with "Shake, Rattle and Roll", which would go on to be highly influential in the development of rock and roll music.

In 1954, Billboard magazine published two charts specifically covering the top-performing songs in the United States in rhythm and blues and related African-American-oriented music genres: Best Sellers in Stores (published as National Best Sellers through the issue dated February 13) and Most Played in Juke Boxes. The two charts are considered part of the lineage of the magazine's multimetric R&B chart launched in 1958, which since 2005 has been published under the title Hot R&B/Hip Hop Songs.

In the issue of Billboard dated January 2, blues singer Big Joe Turner was at number one on the juke box chart with "Honey Hush" and Clyde McPhatter and the Drifters were atop the best sellers listing with "Money Honey". Both acts returned to the top spot later in the year. In June, Turner topped the juke box chart with "Shake, Rattle and Roll". McPhatter and the Drifters reached number one on both listings in July with "Honey Love". Shortly after Turner topped the chart with "Shake, Rattle and Roll", Bill Haley and his Comets released a cover version which is considered one of the most influential recordings in the development of the emerging rock and roll genre. Although Turner would not reach number one again, he would enjoy a lengthy career and be inducted into the Rock and Roll Hall of Fame in 1987. His original recording of "Shake, Rattle and Roll" was ranked number 127 on Rolling Stone's 2003 list of the 500 Greatest Songs of All Time.

The year's longest-running number one on the juke box chart was "The Things That I Used to Do" by Guitar Slim, which spent 14 consecutive weeks in the top spot. It was the only chart entry the Mississippi-born guitarist achieved in his career, but is considered to have significantly influenced the development of both soul music and the use of the electric guitar in rock music. The Rock and Roll Hall of Fame included the track on its list of 500 Songs That Shaped Rock and Roll. On the best sellers chart, "Honey Love" by the Drifters and Clyde McPhatter tied for the longest time spent atop the chart with Roy Hamilton's version of "You'll Never Walk Alone" from the 1945 musical Carousel, both songs spending eight weeks at number one. While no act achieved more than one number one on the juke box chart, three acts joined the Drifters in gaining two chart-toppers on the best sellers listing: Faye Adams, Ruth Brown (who replaced herself at number one in the issue of Billboard dated November 20), and the Midnighters. The year's final number one on the juke box listing was "You Upset Me Baby" by B.B. King and the last chart-topper of 1954 on the best sellers listing was "Hearts of Stone" by the Charms.

== Chart history ==
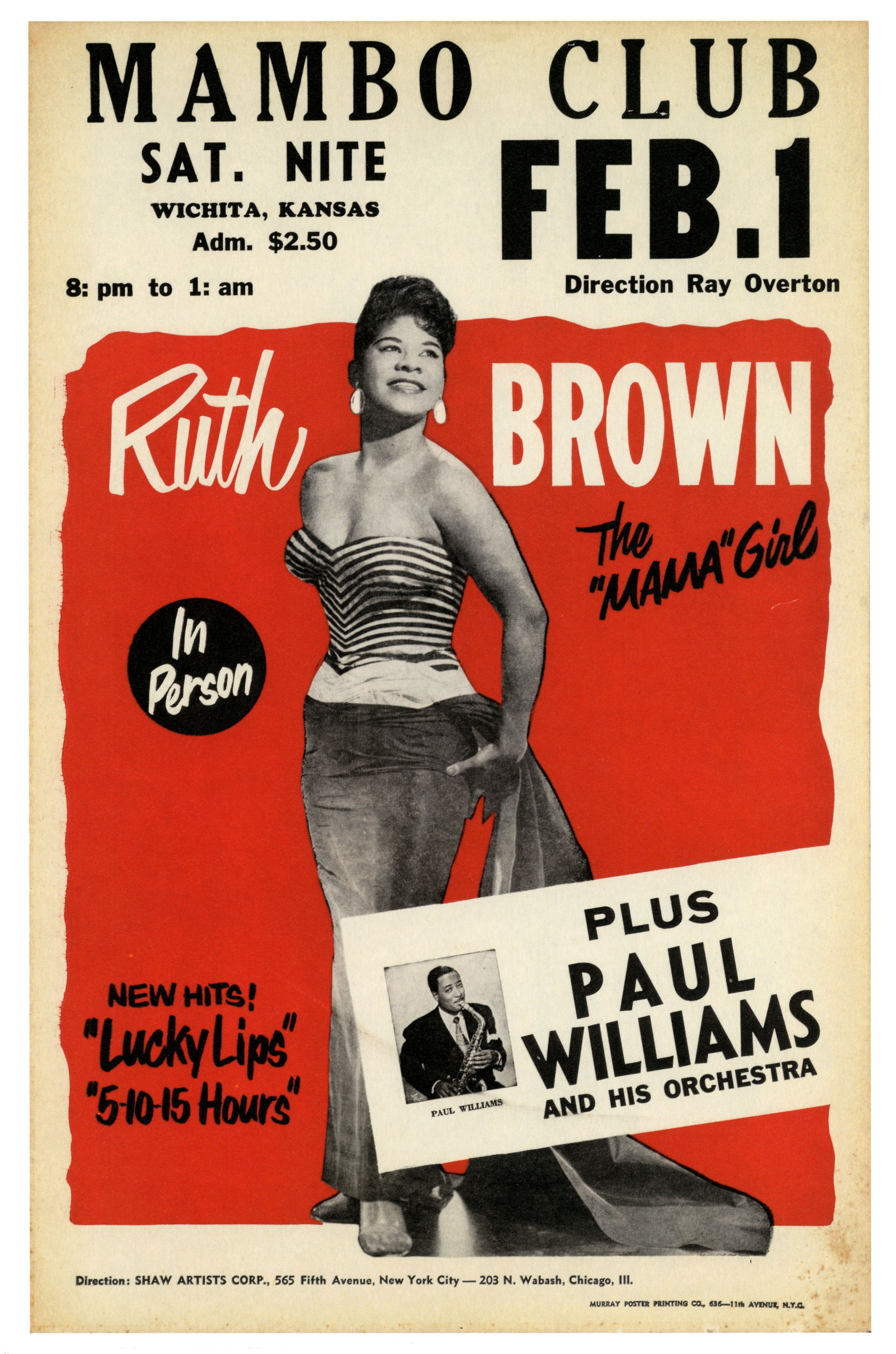
"Oh What a Dream" was a long-running number one for Ruth Brown.

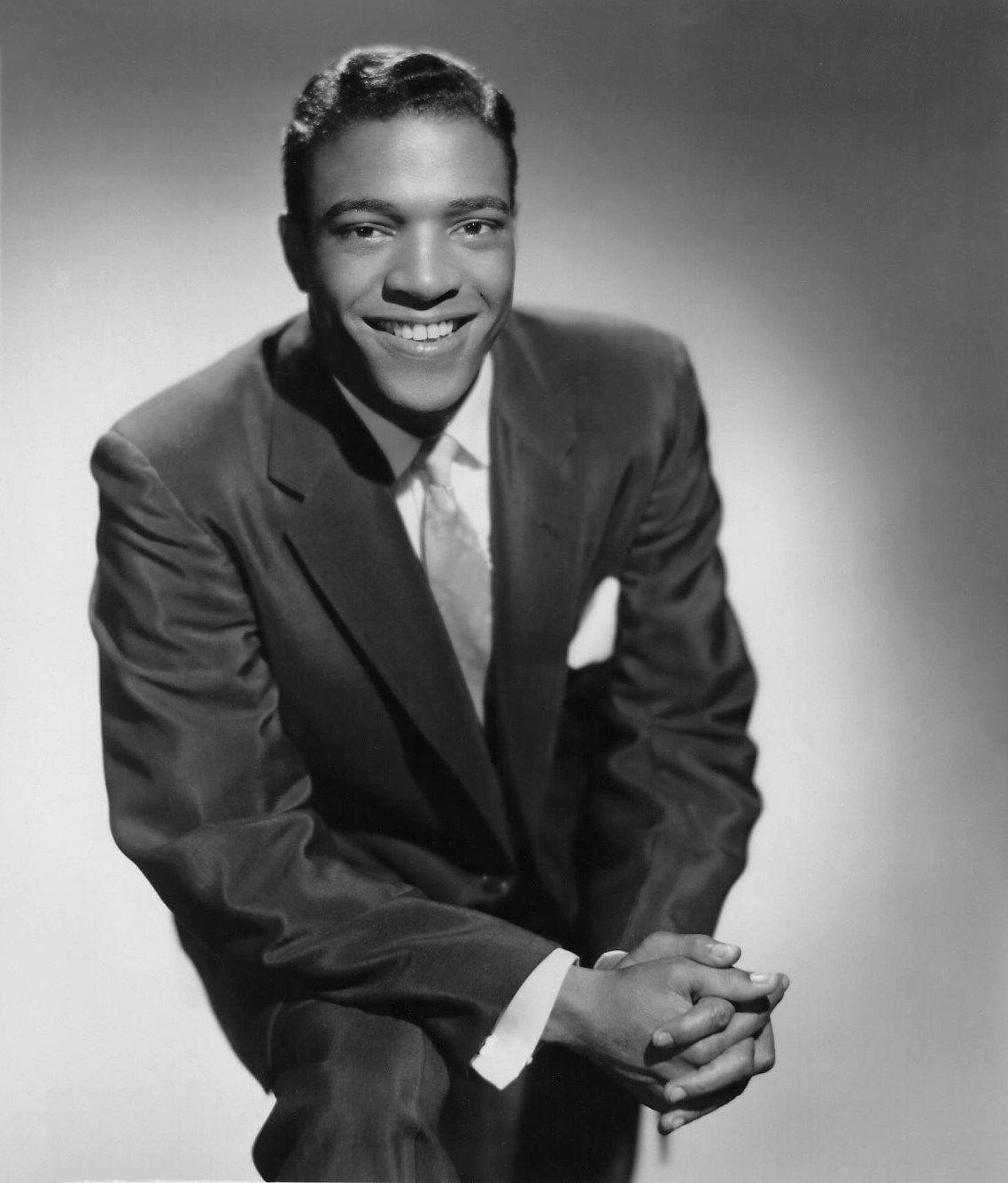
Clyde McPhatter led the Drifters on two songs which were R&B number ones in 1954.

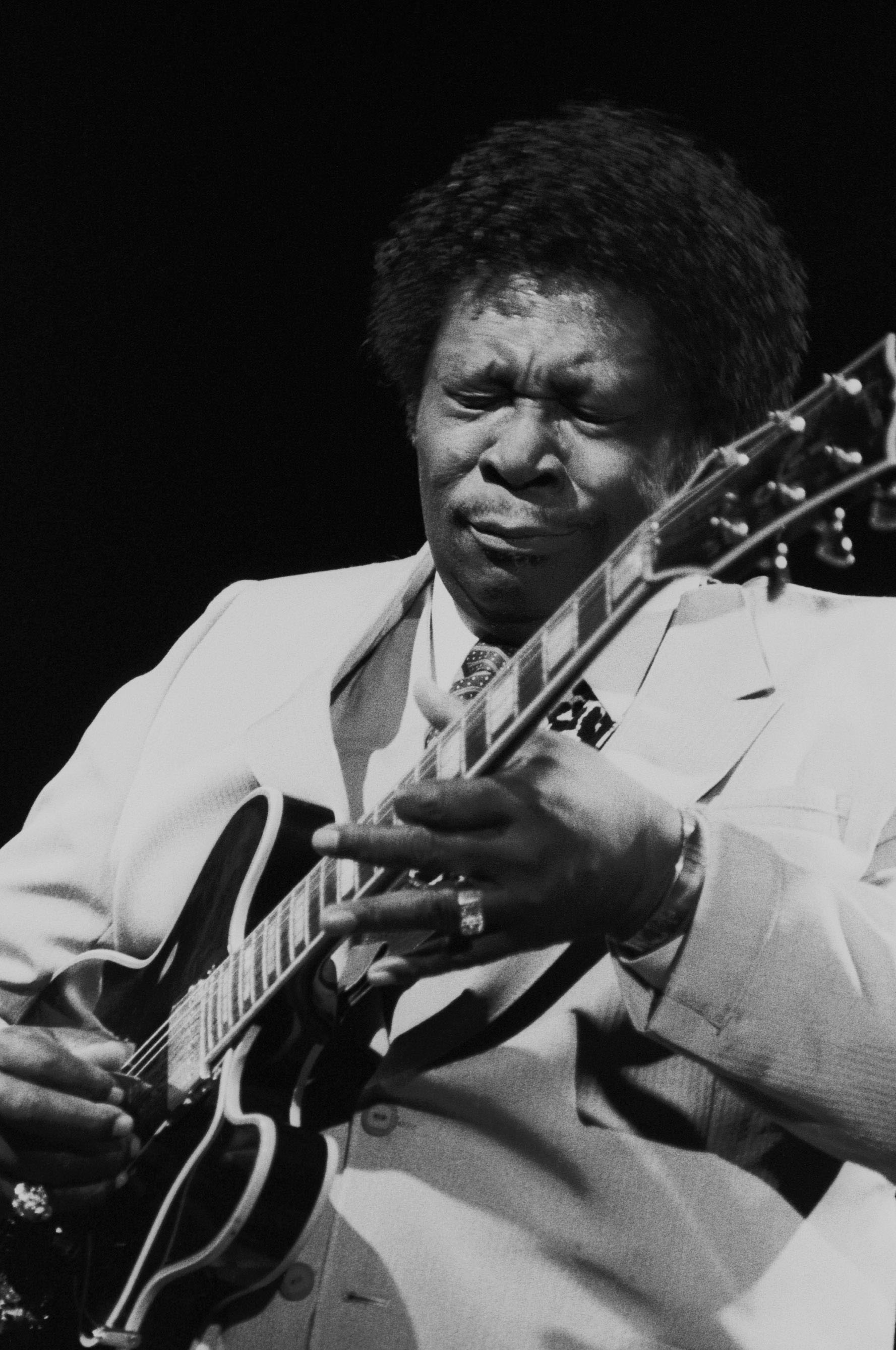
B.B. King (pictured in 1985) ended the year at number one on the juke box chart.

Chart history
Issue date	Juke Box		Best Sellers		Ref.
Issue date	Title	Artist(s)	Title	Artist(s)	Ref.
January 2	"Honey Hush"	Big Joe Turner	"Money Honey"	Clyde McPhatter and the Drifters	
January 9	"Honey Hush"	Big Joe Turner	"Money Honey"	Clyde McPhatter and the Drifters	
January 16	"Honey Hush"	Big Joe Turner	"Money Honey"	Clyde McPhatter and the Drifters	
January 23	"Honey Hush"	Big Joe Turner	"Money Honey"	Clyde McPhatter and the Drifters	
January 30	"The Things That I Used to Do"	Guitar Slim	"Money Honey"	Clyde McPhatter and the Drifters	
February 6	"The Things That I Used to Do"	Guitar Slim	"I'll Be True"	Faye Adams	
February 13	"The Things That I Used to Do"	Guitar Slim	"The Things That I Used to Do"	Guitar Slim	
February 20	"The Things That I Used to Do"	Guitar Slim	"The Things That I Used to Do"	Guitar Slim	
February 27	"The Things That I Used to Do"	Guitar Slim	"The Things That I Used to Do"	Guitar Slim	
March 6	"The Things That I Used to Do"	Guitar Slim	"The Things That I Used to Do"	Guitar Slim	
March 13	"The Things That I Used to Do"	Guitar Slim	"The Things That I Used to Do"	Guitar Slim	
March 20	"The Things That I Used to Do"	Guitar Slim	"The Things That I Used to Do"	Guitar Slim	
March 27	"The Things That I Used to Do"	Guitar Slim	"You'll Never Walk Alone"	Roy Hamilton	
April 3	"The Things That I Used to Do"	Guitar Slim	"You'll Never Walk Alone"	Roy Hamilton	
April 10	"The Things That I Used to Do"	Guitar Slim	"You'll Never Walk Alone"	Roy Hamilton	
April 17	"The Things That I Used to Do"	Guitar Slim	"You'll Never Walk Alone"	Roy Hamilton	
April 24	"The Things That I Used to Do"	Guitar Slim	"You'll Never Walk Alone"	Roy Hamilton	
May 1	"The Things That I Used to Do"	Guitar Slim	"You'll Never Walk Alone"	Roy Hamilton	
May 8	"You'll Never Walk Alone"	Roy Hamilton	"You'll Never Walk Alone"	Roy Hamilton	
May 15	"You'll Never Walk Alone"	Roy Hamilton	"You'll Never Walk Alone"	Roy Hamilton	
May 22	"You'll Never Walk Alone"	Roy Hamilton	"Work with Me, Annie"	The Midnighters	
May 29	"You'll Never Walk Alone"	Roy Hamilton	"Work with Me, Annie"	The Midnighters	
June 5	"You'll Never Walk Alone"	Roy Hamilton	"Work with Me, Annie"	The Midnighters	
June 12	"Shake, Rattle and Roll"	Big Joe Turner	"Work with Me, Annie"	The Midnighters	
June 19	"Shake, Rattle and Roll"	Big Joe Turner	"Work with Me, Annie"	The Midnighters	
June 26	"Shake, Rattle and Roll"	Big Joe Turner	"Work with Me, Annie"	The Midnighters	
July 3	"Work with Me, Annie"	The Midnighters	"Work with Me, Annie"	The Midnighters	
July 10	"Work with Me, Annie"	The Midnighters	"Honey Love"	The Drifters feat. Clyde McPhatter	
July 17	"Work with Me, Annie"	The Midnighters	"Honey Love"	The Drifters feat. Clyde McPhatter	
July 24	"Work with Me, Annie"	The Midnighters	"Honey Love"	The Drifters feat. Clyde McPhatter	
July 31	"Honey Love"	The Drifters feat. Clyde McPhatter	"Honey Love"	The Drifters feat. Clyde McPhatter	
August 7	"Honey Love"	The Drifters feat. Clyde McPhatter	"Honey Love"	The Drifters feat. Clyde McPhatter	
August 14	"Honey Love"	The Drifters feat. Clyde McPhatter	"Honey Love"	The Drifters feat. Clyde McPhatter	
August 21	"Honey Love"	The Drifters feat. Clyde McPhatter	"Honey Love"	The Drifters feat. Clyde McPhatter	
August 28	"Honey Love"	The Drifters feat. Clyde McPhatter	"Honey Love"	The Drifters feat. Clyde McPhatter	
September 4	"Honey Love"	The Drifters feat. Clyde McPhatter	"Oh What a Dream"	Ruth Brown	
September 11	"Honey Love"	The Drifters feat. Clyde McPhatter	"Oh What a Dream"	Ruth Brown	
September 18	"Honey Love"	The Drifters feat. Clyde McPhatter	"Oh What a Dream"	Ruth Brown	
September 25	"Oh What a Dream"	Ruth Brown	"Annie Had a Baby"	The Midnighters	
October 2	"Oh What a Dream"	Ruth Brown	"Annie Had a Baby"	The Midnighters	
October 9	"Oh What a Dream"	Ruth Brown	"It Hurts Me to My Heart"	Faye Adams	
October 16	"Oh What a Dream"	Ruth Brown	"It Hurts Me to My Heart"	Faye Adams	
October 23	"Oh What a Dream"	Ruth Brown	"It Hurts Me to My Heart"	Faye Adams	
October 30	"Oh What a Dream"	Ruth Brown	"It Hurts Me to My Heart"	Faye Adams	
November 6	"Oh What a Dream"	Ruth Brown	"It Hurts Me to My Heart"	Faye Adams	
November 13	"Oh What a Dream"	Ruth Brown	"Oh What a Dream"	Ruth Brown	
November 20	"It Hurts Me to My Heart"	Faye Adams	"Mambo Baby"	Ruth Brown	
November 27	"It Hurts Me to My Heart"	Faye Adams	"Hearts of Stone"	The Charms	
December 4	"It Hurts Me to My Heart"	Faye Adams	"Hearts of Stone"	The Charms	
December 11	"It Hurts Me to My Heart"	Faye Adams	"Hearts of Stone"	The Charms	
December 18	"It Hurts Me to My Heart"	Faye Adams	"Hearts of Stone"	The Charms	
December 25	"You Upset Me Baby"	B.B. King	"Hearts of Stone"	The Charms	
