= Rose Marie McCoy =

American singer-songwriter

- Born: Rose Marie Hinton; April 19, 1922; Oneida, Arkansas, U.S.
- Died: January 20, 2015 (aged 92) Champaign, Illinois, U.S.
- Genres: Country, jazz, rhythm & blues, soul, traditional pop
- Occupations: Songwriter, singer
- Years active: 1942–2015

Rose Marie McCoy (April 19, 1922 – January 20, 2015) was an American songwriter. She began her career as an aspiring singer before becoming a prolific songwriter during the 1950s and 1960s. Many artists have recorded some of the over 800 songs she published, including Big Maybelle, James Brown, Ruth Brown, Nat King Cole, Aretha Franklin, Elvis Presley, and Ike & Tina Turner.

== Life and career ==
=== Early life ===
McCoy was born Rose Marie Hinton to Levi and Celetia Brazil Hinton in Oneida, Arkansas, on April 19, 1922. Her father was a farmer. She later married James McCoy and moved to New York City with $6 in her pocket to pursue a singing career in 1942. Living in Harlem, she supported herself by working at a Chinese laundry and performing at nightclubs on the weekends. McCoy eventually booked gigs at famous venues such as the Baby Grand in Harlem, the Flame Show Bar in Detroit, the Sportsmen's Club in Cincinnati and Basin Street in Toronto. She opened for performers like Ruth Brown, Moms Mabley, Dinah Washington, and Pigmeat Markham.

=== Songwriting career ===
In 1952, Rose Marie McCoy wrote and recorded two songs for the newly formed rhythm and blues label Wheeler Records, "Cheating Blues" and "Georgie Boy Blues". After publishers heard these songs, they sought her out and she started working at the Brill Building in New York. One of the first songs she was asked to write was a half-spoken, half-sung song, "Gabbin' Blues", co-written with Leroy Kirkland, and sung by Big Maybelle with the spoken part provided by McCoy herself. "Gabbin' Blues", which reached number 3 on the Billboard R&B chart, was the first big hit for Big Maybelle and the songwriter's first hit.

McCoy wrote other songs for Big Maybelle and other popular R&B artists including Louis Jordan ("If I Had Any Sense I'd Go Back Home" and "House Party") and co-wrote, with Fred Mendelsohn, Nappy Brown's 1955 single "Don't Be Angry" (also recorded for the pop market by the Crew-Cuts).

In 1954, Rose Marie McCoy teamed with songwriter Charles Singleton. They soon scored their first hit, "It Hurts Me to My Heart", recorded in 1954 by Faye Adams. Their collaboration lasted about eight years and, individually and together, they penned many hits for the top artists of the time, including Elvis Presley's "I Beg of You", The Eagles' "Trying to Get to You" (later recorded in Presley's Sun Sessions), Ruth Brown's "Mambo Baby", and Nappy Brown's "Little by Little". Singleton and McCoy's tunes were also recorded by Nat King Cole ("If I May", "My Personal Possession"), Little Willie John ("Letter from My Darling"), Eartha Kitt, Eddy Arnold, Big Joe Turner, The Du Droppers, Little Esther, The Clovers, and many other top artists of the time.

After the Singleton and McCoy team split up, Rose Marie McCoy continued to write songs on her own and collaborated with other writers. Noted for her independent stance, McCoy turned down several opportunities to join major record labels such as Motown, Stax and Atlantic, so she could keep control of her music. One of her most successful songs was "It's Gonna Work Out Fine", co-written with Joe Seneca (as Sylvia McKinney), which was released by Ike & Tina Turner in 1961. It reached number 14 on the Billboard Hot 100 and number 2 on the R&B chart, earning them their first Grammy nomination. She also collaborated successfully with songwriter Helen Miller, writing "We'll Cry Together" for Maxine Brown, and "Got to See If I Can't Get Mommy (To Come Back Home)" for Jerry Butler.

Though she is most often associated with songs recorded by R&B artists of the 1950s and 1960s, McCoy wrote many jazz, pop, rock 'n' roll, country, and gospel songs. Jazz vocalist Jimmy Scott recorded nine of her tunes, and Sarah Vaughan recorded six of her songs, five of them on the singer's 1974 album Send in the Clowns. McCoy also composed jingles, including one sung by Aretha Franklin and Ray Charles for Coca-Cola.

The biography, Thought We Were Writing the Blues: But They Called It Rock 'n' Roll, on the life and career of McCoy was written by Arlene Corsano and published in 2014.

== Personal life ==
In 1943, McCoy married James McCoy, a supervisor at the Ford Motor Company. He died in 2000. For more than 50 years, McCoy was a resident of Teaneck, New Jersey, until she relocated to live with her niece in Illinois.

== Death ==
McCoy died at the age of 92 at Carle Foundation Hospital in Urbana, Illinois, on January 20, 2015.

== Honors ==
McCoy was honored by Community Works NYC in their 2008 exhibition and concert series "Ladies Singing the Blues". McCoy received a five-minute standing ovation during the award ceremony at the Cathedral Church of St. John the Divine in New York City for her contribution to music. To the delight of the audience, "It's gonna work out fine" was played as she was escorted to the stage.

In 2008, McCoy was inducted into the Arkansas Black Hall of Fame.

In 2022, McCoy was inducted into the Women Songwriters Hall of Fame.

In 2024, McCoy was inducted into the National Rhythm & Blues Hall of Fame.

== Discography ==
=== Singles ===
- 1951: "Cheating Blues" / "Georgie Boy" (Wheeler 102)
- 1954: "Dippin' In My Business / Down Here" (Cat 111)
- 1977: "I Do The Best I Can With What I Got" (Brunswick 55541)
- 2013: "Switch Around" (with Wallie Hoskins) (Beltone ST1005) – previously unreleased

== Sources ==
- Broadcast Music, Inc.
- Broven, John, "The Story of Rose Marie McCoy", Juke Blues, Issue 26, Summer 1992, pp. 8–15.
- Freeland, David, "Rose Marie McCoy," American Songwriter, Vol. 21, No. 3, March/April 2006, pp. 65–67.
- Rose Marie McCoy papers.
- Rosenbaum, Dan, "Songwriting Sistas", Music Alive, Vol. 26, No. 5, Feb. 2007, pp. 2–3.
