= Dorcas Cochran =

American screenwriter

Dorcas Cochran (c. 1903 – July 6, 1991) was an American lyricist and screenwriter. She is also referenced by her married name, Dorcas Cochran Jewell.

== Biography ==
As a lyricist, her best-known song was "Again," which had multiple recorded versions on the US charts. She also wrote the lyrics for two songs which were major hits for Tony Martin: "I Get Ideas" and "Here." Her English language lyric for "Under the Bridges of Paris" was recorded by both Eartha Kitt and Dean Martin for United Kingdom chart hits in 1955, although they failed to chart in the United States, and Frankie Laine's recording of her song, "In the Beginning" similarly charted in the UK but not in the US that year. She also wrote the lyrics for "Mostly Martha", which charted for The Crew-Cuts in 1955.

In 1959, she wrote the lyrics to Lionel Newman's theme to the television series Adventures in Paradise. She died in Las Vegas, Nevada.

== Music ==
She contributed to a number of films:

- Frisco Lil (1942)
- Juke Box Jenny (1942)
- Swing It Soldier (1941)
- Swing Out the Blues (1944)
- Girl on the Spot (1946)
- The Wife of Monte Cristo (1946)
- Wild West (1946)
- Girl in the Case (1944)
- The Cincinnati Kid (1965)
