= Here (1954 song) =

Song
- Published: 1954
- Composer(s): Harold Grant
- Lyricist(s): Dorcas Cochran

"Here" is a popular song, with music written by Harold Grant and lyrics by Dorcas Cochran, published in 1954. (Most sources show music and lyrics by both, but Cochran was a lyricist and Grant a composer.) The melody was adapted from the operatic aria, "Caro nome," from the opera Rigoletto by Giuseppe Verdi.

A hit version was recorded by Tony Martin on December 26, 1953. This recording was released by RCA Victor Records as catalog number 20-5665. It first reached the Billboard magazine Best Seller chart on March 17, 1954, and lasted 16 weeks on the chart, peaking at #7.

The song was also recorded by The Four Belles with Larry Clinton's orchestra and by Jimmy Young at about the same time, and by Robert Goulet in 1961.
