= Guitar Slim Jr. =

American singer

- Born: Rodney Glenn Armstrong; August 24, 1952 (age 73); New Orleans, Louisiana, United States
- Genres: New Orleans blues
- Occupation(s): Guitarist, singer
- Instrument(s): Guitar, vocals
- Years active: 1970s–present
- Website: guitarslimjr.com/NewOrleansBlues/Welcome.html

Guitar Slim Jr. (born Rodney Glenn Armstrong, August 24, 1952, New Orleans, Louisiana, United States) is an American New Orleans blues guitarist and singer. Over his lengthy playing career, he has worked with numerous other blues musicians. His debut album, Story of My Life (1988), was nominated for a Grammy Award.

== Biography ==
Armstrong's father was the noted blues performer Guitar Slim, best known for the million-selling song "The Things That I Used to Do", which is listed in The Rock and Roll Hall of Fame's 500 Songs That Shaped Rock and Roll.

Guitar Slim Jr., has worked for many years on the New Orleans blues club circuit, and his repertoire became more reliant on his father's material. His debut album, recorded in 1988, Story of My Life, was nominated for a Grammy Award for Best Traditional Blues Album in 1989. New Orleans music historian Jeff Hannusch stated in the sleeve notes for that album that Slim Jr. "has been a fixture on the black New Orleans club circuit for the better part of 20 years...[but] doesn't get to play the posher uptown clubs."

He toured with Stevie Ray Vaughan in the late 1980s, and they remained friends until the Vaughan's death in 1990. Slim's 1996 release, Nothing Nice, featured the Memphis Horns.

His most recent recorded work was the 2010 album Brought Up the Hardway.

He played at the New Orleans Jazz & Heritage Festival in 2011.

== Discography ==
Year of release	Album title	Record label
1988	Story of My Life	Orleans Records
1996	Nothing Nice	Warehouse Creek Records
2010	Brought Up the Hardway	ClyDesign Studios

== See also ==
- List of New Orleans blues musicians
- New Orleans rhythm and blues
