= Charles Singleton (songwriter) =

American songwriter (1913–1985)

Charlie "Hoss" Singleton
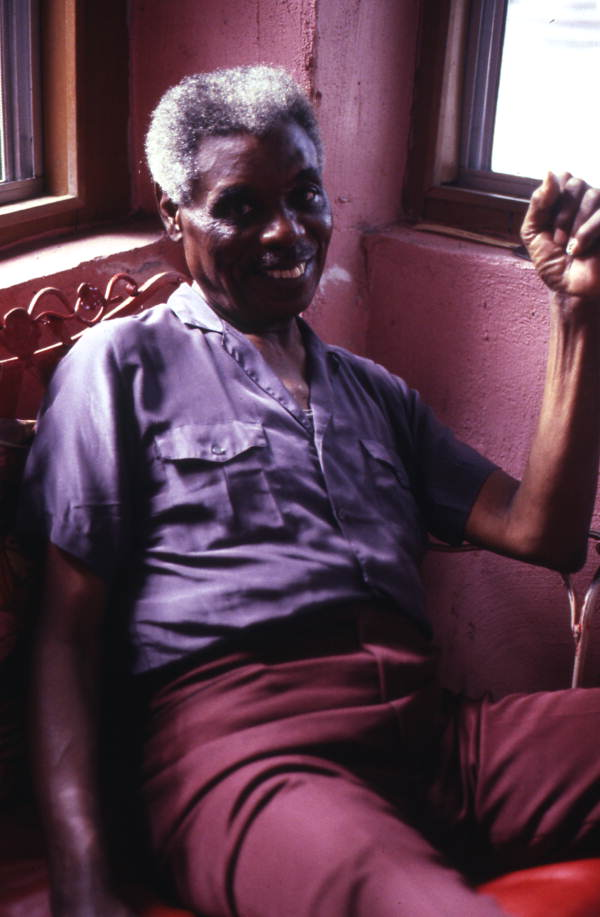
- Singleton on August 9, 1985

Background information
- Born: Charles Fowler Singleton, Jr. September 17, 1913; Jacksonville, Florida, United States
- Died: December 12, 1985 (aged 72) Jacksonville, Florida, United States
- Genres: Pop music
- Occupation: Songwriter
- Years active: 1950s–1980s

Charles Fowler Singleton Jr. (September 17, 1913 – December 12, 1985), known as Charlie "Hoss" Singleton, was an American songwriter, best known for having co-written the lyrics for "Strangers in the Night" and "Moon Over Naples" (later covered as "Spanish Eyes").

Singleton wrote or co-wrote more than a thousand songs. "Strangers in the Night" reached number one on the Billboard charts for Frank Sinatra, and the Elvis Presley version of "Spanish Eyes" sold in excess of three million copies.

== Biography ==
Charles Singleton attended several schools in and around Jacksonville, Florida, United States, and graduated in 1935 from Stanton High School. He was always interested in singing and dancing, and by the time he left school he had become a proficient songwriter. He also produced shows and was responsible for several musical extravaganzas, including April Frolics, which was staged at a nightspot in LaVilla in Jacksonville. Singleton continued to work in Jacksonville into the 1940s.

In the early 1950s, Singleton moved to New York City and presented his lyrics to Decca Records, who signed him up as a songwriter. By 1954, he had teamed up with Rose Marie McCoy, and the pair had their first writing successes with such R&B hits as Joe Turner's "Well All Right", Faye Adams' number 1 R&B hit "It Hurts Me to My Heart", and Ruth Brown's "Mambo Baby". Singleton and McCoy also wrote "Tryin' to Get to You", notably recorded by Elvis Presley at Sun (1955) but first released by Washington, D.C. group The Eagles in 1954. In 1956, Singleton and McCoy, as Charlie and Rosie, recorded a single together on RCA Victor.

Singleton went on to write songs for a number of notable artists, including Pat Boone, Nat King Cole, Ella Fitzgerald, B. B. King, Peggy Lee, Johnny Mathis, Wayne Newton and Andy Williams. One of his biggest writing successes was "Don't Forbid Me" by Pat Boone, a number one pop hit recorded in 1956. In the late 1950s and early 1960s, Singleton largely wrote songs without a writing partner, and also recorded an album, The Big Twist Hits, released in 1962 and credited to the Charlie "Hoss" Singleton Combo.

"Strangers in the Night" began as an instrumental called "Beddy Bye", by German bandleader and composer Bert Kaempfert, which appeared on the soundtrack of the film A Man Could Get Killed. When Frank Sinatra's producer Jimmy Bowen heard the tune, he asked Kaempfert to turn it into a song, and Kaempfert approached Singleton and American composer and songwriter Eddie Snyder for help. Singleton wrote the lyrics and Snyder adapted the music for what became "Strangers in the Night". Sinatra initially called the song "a piece of shit" after the first take had to be discarded because session guitarist Glen Campbell had made a mistake. But Sinatra changed his mind during the second take when he began adlibbing "dooby-dooby-doo". "Strangers in the Night" reached number-one on the Billboard Hot 100 and Adult Contemporary charts in 1966, and rejuvenated Sinatra's career.

Singleton and Snyder had also reworked another Kaempfert instrumental called "Moon Over Naples" into the song "Spanish Eyes", which was successfully recorded by Elvis Presley, Al Martino, Engelbert Humperdinck, Tom Jones, Willie Nelson, Julio Iglesias, Faith No More, and others.

Singleton, who also produced several platinum albums, died in 1985.

In some sources, Singleton seems to be confused with another musician called Charlie Singleton, a saxophonist born in Kansas City around 1930, who recorded jump blues in New York from around 1950.
