= Shake a Hand =

Song by Faye Adams
- B-side: "I've Got to Leave You"
- Recorded: 1953
- Genre: Blues; gospel
- Label: Herald Records
- Songwriter: Joe Morris

Faye Adams singles chronology
"Shake a Hand"	"I'll Be True"

"Shake a Hand" is a 1953 song written by the trumpeter and bandleader Joe Morris and originally recorded by Faye Adams, whose version stayed number one on the U.S. Billboard R&B chart for nine weeks.

== Background ==
The song, which has a strong gospel feel throughout, depicts a reassuring new lover making promises: "Just give me a chance, I'll take care of everything.

== Cover versions ==
- Red Foley (number 6 country, 1953)
- Johnnie Ray (1956)
- Pat Boone (on the 1957 album Pat)
- The Mike Pedicin Quintet (number 71 pop, 1958)
- Little Richard (on the 1959 album The Fabulous Little Richard)
- LaVern Baker (number 13 R&B, 1960)
- Jackie Wilson and Linda Hopkins (number 21 R&B, number 42 pop, 1963)
- Freddie Scott (on the 1967 album Are You Lonely for Me?)
- Magic Sam (1968, on the posthumous 1993 album Give Me Time)
- Elvis Presley (on the 1975 album Today)
- Ike & Tina Turner (on the 1985 album Golden Empire)
- Lou Ann Barton (on the 1989 album Read My Lips)
- Paul McCartney (on the 1999 album Run Devil Run)
