= Mike Pedicin =

American saxophonist (1917–2016)

- Born: Michael L.. Pedicine; October 24, 1917; Philadelphia, Pennsylvania, United States
- Died: June 26, 2016 (aged 98) Ardmore, Pennsylvania, United States
- Genres: Jazz, swing, rock
- Occupation: Musician
- Instruments: Saxophone
- Labels: RCA Victor, Cameo Records, Federal Records, Gotham Records
- Formerly of: The Four Sharps, Mike Pedicin Quartet

Mike Pedicin (born Michael L. Pedicine; October 24, 1917 – June 26, 2016) was an American saxophonist and jazz bandleader. He initially performed in the idiom of swing music, before switching to heavily influenced R&B-flavoured dance music, becoming an early pioneer of rock and roll in a similar vein of Bill Haley.

== Biography ==
Pedicine was born the son of a barber in Philadelphia, Pennsylvania and was one of four children. He started playing the saxophone at the age of nine. By the age of 10, he was a regular on the local radio show "The Horn & Hardart Children's Hour". He appeared on the show for eight years.

In the 1950s and 1960s, during the summer, Pedicin's band played at various night spots in Somers Point, New Jersey; Tony Marts & Bay Shores, being the two most popular spots. His best-known record was a cover version of Faye Adams 1953 hit "Shake a Hand " (released by Cameo Records, 1958).

Pedicin, a resident of Ardmore, Pennsylvania, died of pneumonia in June 2016 at the age of 98.
