= The Eagles (rhythm and blues group) =

- Origin: Washington, D.C.
- Genres: Rhythm and blues
- Years active: 1954–1958
- Labels: Mercury; Bear Family

The Eagles were an American 1950s rhythm and blues vocal group from the Washington, D.C. area, United States. They recorded the original version of "Tryin' to Get to You" (Rose Marie McCoy - Charles Singleton), better known through the versions by Elvis Presley (one of his Sun recordings) and The Animals (as "Trying To Get You"). The format of the title on The Eagles' record was “Tryin’ to Get to You”, with an apostrophe.

The Eagles released "Tryin' to Get to You" on Mercury Records (#70391, the B-side of "Please Please") in 1954, the year before Elvis Presley's version was recorded. Presley's vocal delivery appears to be influenced by that of The Eagles' lead singer, but Elvis dispenses altogether with the breathing in between the chorus and the verses. In addition, Scotty Moore's guitar solo on the Presley recording replaces a saxophone solo heard on the original.

The Eagles had two further releases on Mercury, "Such a Fool"/"Don't You Wanna Be Mine" (#70464, 1954) and "I Told Myself"/"What A Crazy Feeling" (#70524 1955). An Eagles anthology LP released c.1989 by German reissue label Bear Family, Trying To Get To You, included three additional tracks.
