= Mostly Martha =

Mostly Martha can refer to:

- Mostly Martha (film) (Bella Martha), a 2001 German film
- "Mostly Martha" (song), a popular version of Friedrich von Flotow's aria M’apparì tutt’amor, recorded by The Crew-Cuts
