= When You Come to the End of the Day =

Studio album by Perry Como
- Released: September 1958
- Recorded: April 30, May 1, June 18, 19, 23, 1958
- Genre: Vocal
- Length: 34:18
- Label: RCA Victor
- Producer: Joe Reisman

Perry Como chronology
Saturday Night with Mr. C (1958)	When You Come to the End of the Day (1958)	Como Swings (1959)

Professional ratings
Review scores
Source	Rating
AllMusic	4/5 stars

When You Come to the End of the Day is Perry Como's fourth RCA Victor 12" long-playing album, released in 1958 and the second recorded in stereophonic sound.

== Overview ==
When You Come to the End of the Day was recorded as an album of inspirational songs featuring well known traditional hymns such as "In the Garden" and modern inspirational tunes including "May the Good Lord Bless and Keep You". The album was reissued on compact disc in 2001.

== Chart performance ==
The album peaked at No. 16 on both the Billboard Best Selling LP's chart and the Cash Box Best Selling Pop Albums chart in January 1959.

== Track listing ==
Side one

1. "He's Got the Whole World in His Hands" (Traditional gospel song adapted by Geoff Love)
2. "Whither Thou Goest" (Music and Lyrics by Guy Singer, 1954)
3. "No Well On Earth" (Music by Dave Mann and lyrics by Bob Hilliard)
4. "Only One" (Words and Music by Sunny Skylar, Tom Glazer and Andrew Ackers)
5. "Scarlet Ribbons" (Music by Evelyn Danzig and lyrics by Jack Segal, 1949)
6. "I May Never Pass This Way Again" (Words and Music by Murray Wizell and Irving Melcher)

Side two

1. "A Still Small Voice" (Music by Ben Weisman and lyrics by Al Stillman)
2. "In the Garden" (Words and Music by C. Austin Miles, 1912)
3. "May the Good Lord Bless and Keep You" (Words and Music by Meredith Willson)
4. "Prayer for Peace" (Music by Nick Acquaviva with English lyrics by Norman Gimbel)
5. "All Through the Night" (Traditional Old Welsh hymn, Arranged by Ray Charles)
6. "When You Come to the End of the Day" (Music by Frank C. Westphal and lyrics by Gus Kahn)

== Charts ==
Chart (1959)	Peak position
US Billboard Best Selling LP's	16
US Cashbox Best Selling Pop Albums	16
