= I'll Be True =

Song by Faye Adams and the Joe Morris Orchestra
- B-side: "Happiness to My Soul"
- Label: Herald Records
- Songwriter(s): Bill McLemore

Faye Adams and the Joe Morris Orchestra singles chronology
"Shake a Hand"	"I'll Be True"

"I'll Be True" is a 1953 song written by Bill McLemore and performed by Faye Adams. The song was Faye Adams' second US Billboard R&B chart entry and her second number one on that chart. "I'll Be True" stayed at number one for one week and Adams was backed by the Joe Morris Orchestra.

== Covers ==
- Later in 1953, Bill Haley & His Comets recorded the song.
