= Whither Thou Goest =

Song by Les Paul and Mary Ford
- Written: 1954
- Published: 1954
- Released: 1954
- Genre: Pop
- Label: Capitol Records
- Songwriter: Earl Chalmers Guisinger (as Guy Singer)

"Whither Thou Goest" is a popular song written by Earl Chalmers Guisinger, under the pseudonym Guy Singer. The song was published in 1954. The words are adapted from the Bible (Ruth 1:16-17) (King James Version).

The most popular version was recorded by Les Paul and Mary Ford. Other versions were made by Perry Como (for his album When You Come to the End of the Day), Bing Crosby in a medley on his album On the Sentimental Side (1962), George Morgan (see below), Mahalia Jackson (included in her album Great Songs of Love and Faith {1962}) and Leonard Cohen.

The recording by Les Paul and Mary Ford was released by Capitol Records as catalog number 2928. It first reached the Billboard magazine charts on October 6, 1954, and lasted 9 weeks on the chart, peaking at number 14.

"Whither Thou Goest" was recorded by George Morgan and released in early 1957 on a 12-inch Columbia 33 1/3 R.P.M. long play album entitled Morgan, By George!. The Columbia standard "Red Label" LP was recorded prior to the advent of stereo in monophonic high fidelity in 1956 and was released in the winter of early 1957. The LP contains three other songs of much stronger gospel origins, "Oh, Gentle Shepherd" by well-known songwriter Cindy Walker; "Mansion Over the Hilltop" and "Jesus Savior, Pilot Me". George Morgan's version of "Whither" is only two minutes and 13 seconds long on the LP and is performed in a medium-slow tempo at 3/4 metre and is composed mostly of lead guitars, a violin, muted rhythm cymbal, acoustic bass and a small background singing group containing a soprano singer who backs Morgan quite strongly in the mix. It is the second song on side B of the Columbia LP containing 12 songs in all. Though a "pop" song, radio stations across the United States continue to program George Morgan's version as a gospel selection to this day.

The song was performed live by Leonard Cohen since 1988 and was released on his album Live in London (2009).

Additional Compositions of Ruth

James Dunne released a new composition of this story on September 10, 2019, entitled "Whither Thou Goest, I Will Go." His version begins with Naomi, whose emotional outburst of despair precipitates the first response from Ruth of the title line. The song is structured as a duet debate that ultimately ends with their reconciliation. The words from the Book of Ruth, Chapter 1, are used for the lyrics with some artistic license. For example, a chorus was added to explain "how" Naomi and Ruth reconciled, which is not explained in the Book of Ruth. That reconciling factor, proposed by James Dunne, is that of a third-party - the Lord. Upon that, Naomi and Ruth agree.
