= Joe Morris (trumpeter) =

American trumpeter (1922–1958)

- Born: Joseph Lee Morris; March 2, 1922; Montgomery, Alabama, U.S.
- Died: November 7, 1958 (aged 36) Phoenix, Arizona, U.S.
- Genres: Jazz, rhythm and blues
- Occupation: Musician
- Instrument: Trumpet
- Years active: 1942–1958

Joseph Lee Morris (March 2, 1922 – November 7, 1958) was an American jazz and rhythm and blues trumpeter.

== Biography ==
Born in Montgomery, Alabama, United States, Morris began his career as a jazz trumpeter, working and recording with Earl Bostic, Milt Buckner, Arnett Cobb, Dizzy Gillespie, Johnny Griffin, Buddy Rich, Dinah Washington, Big Joe Turner, and Lionel Hampton.

After working with Hampton as a writer, arranger, and trumpeter, he left in 1946 to set up the Joe Morris Orchestra, which featured, among others, Johnny Griffin, George Freeman, Elmo Hope, Percy Heath, Philly Joe Jones, Long John Hobbs, and Hasaan Ibn Ali (then known as William Langford). One of his first credited recordings as bandleader was with Wynonie Harris on "Drinkin' Wine Spo-Dee-O-Dee".

Morris signed with the then fledgling Boston Records, and released "Anytime, Any Place, Anywhere", with vocals by Laurie Tate. This rose to number one on the U.S. R&B chart in 1950, and he followed up with "Don't Take Your Love Away from Me". The band functioned as the unofficial house band for Atlantic Records in the early 1950s, and several future stars passed through its ranks, including Ray Charles and Lowell Fulson.

In 1953, Tate left for a solo career, and Morris replaced her with his new discovery, Faye Adams. He moved to Herald Records, where he backed Adams on her number-one R&B hit, his own composition "Shake a Hand", and its follow-up, "I'll Be True", also an R&B number-one hit. At the same time, he had his own hit with "I Had a Notion", featuring vocals by Al Savage.

Morris died in Phoenix, Arizona, of a cerebral haemorrhage in 1958, aged 36.
