= The Nutmegs =

American doo-wop vocal group

The Nutmegs were a 1950s American doo wop vocal group from New Haven, Connecticut, United States. They are best known for their songs "Story Untold" and "Ship of Love," both released in 1955. Each single made the national R&B charts, with "Story Untold" reaching No. 2 and "Ship of Love" peaking at No. 13. The quintet was led by tenor Leroy Griffin and was signed to Herald Records.

Leroy Griffin died in a factory incident in 1966. Leroy McNeil died in 1975 during an altercation.
