= Frank Westphal =

American pianist, dance band leader and composer (1889–1948)

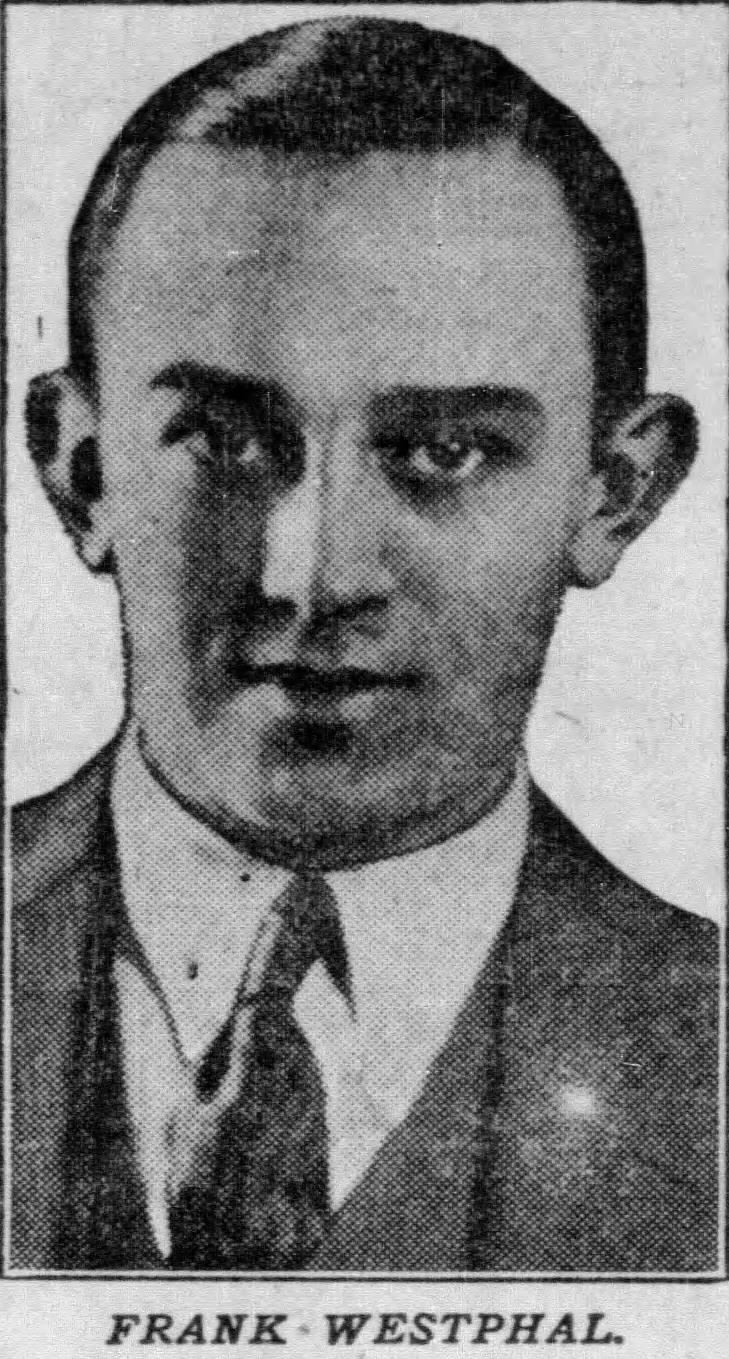
- Westphal in 1925

Background information
- Born: Frank Christian Westphal; June 15, 1889; Chicago, Illinois, U.S.
- Died: November 23, 1948 (aged 59) Hines, Illinois, U.S.
- Genres: Vaudeville, dance band, jazz
- Occupations: Musician, bandleader, composer
- Instrument: Piano
- Years active: 1910-1930s
- Label: Columbia Records

Frank Christian Westphal (June 15, 1889 – November 23, 1948) was an American pianist, dance band leader and composer who recorded in the 1920s, following the end of his marriage to singer Sophie Tucker.

== Biography ==
He was born in Chicago, the grandson of German immigrants. By 1910 he had started working as a pianist in vaudeville shows, where he met singer Sophie Tucker, who was two years his senior. She hired him as her accompanist in 1913, and they became lovers though this was not disclosed at the time. Westphal was sometimes co-billed with Tucker over the next three years, as Tucker's popularity grew.

In 1916, though their personal relationship continued, Westphal withdrew from the act, and was instead installed as proprietor of the Sophie Tucker Garage. The business venture failed, and in 1917 he returned to her shows as a separate act, sometimes becoming an unscheduled participant in the act of fellow performers The Marx Brothers. Westphal and Tucker married in October 1917, but Westphal became increasingly discontented with his secondary role onstage.

In 1918 he was drafted into the US Army, where he served as a mechanic. Tucker sued for divorce in 1919, and the marriage was formally dissolved the following year.

After leaving the army, Westphal was involved in various bands including the Benson Orchestra of Chicago. In 1921, he became established with his own dance orchestra at the newly opened Rainbo Gardens in Chicago. The open-air venue had a revolving stage to allow for continuous entertainment, table seating for 2,000 patrons, and space on the dance floor for an additional 1,500.

Westphal's band became popular for its "crisp, clever arrangements and superb musicianship." His musicians included, at various times, Charles Burns and Austyn Edwards (trumpets), Herb Winfield (trombone), Bill and Jack Richards (saxophones), John Jensen (tuba) and Earl Roberts (banjo). The band recorded in Chicago for Columbia Records regularly between 1922 and 1924, recording over 50 tracks of which 34 were issued. These included "Bugle Call Rag", "Two Time Dan", and "Oh! Sister, Ain't That Hot!", as well as novelty piano pieces played by Westphal in the style of Zez Confrey and Edward Claypoole such as "Pianola" and "Dusting The Keys", which are "testimonies to his immense skill at the keyboard".

Westphal did not record after 1924. He formed a new band, the All American Pioneers, and became the studio director of radio station WENR in Chicago, where he performed regularly and remained until the 1930s. He was also active as a composer. Among other songs, he wrote, with lyricist Gus Kahn, "When You Come to the End of the Day", later a hit for Perry Como.

He died in 1948, after spending several years in hospital.
