= Cat Records =

US record label owned by Atlantic Recording Corporation

- Company type: Conglomerate
- Industry: record label
- Founded: April 1954; United States
- Headquarters: United States

Cat Records was a short-lived subsidiary of Atlantic Records, specializing in rhythm and blues music. The label was founded in April 1954 to cash in on the popularity of R&B records among white teenagers which were called "cat" records in the South, a word coined by Atlantic executive Jerry Wexler until the term rock and roll took hold, hence the name of the label. A total of 18 singles were released, on both 78 r.p.m. and 45 r.p.m. records, over nearly two years before the label was discontinued. Its biggest hit was "Sh-Boom" by The Chords. Other artists on the label included "Little" Sylvia Vanderpool and Mickey Baker, Floyd Dixon, Rose Marie McCoy, and Margie Day.
