= Mostly Martha (song) =

"Mostly Martha" is a popular song written by Ralph Sterling (music) and Dorcas Cochran (lyrics). The best-known version was recorded by The Crew-Cuts in 1955. This recording was released by Mercury Records as catalog number 70741 along with the flip side of "Angels In the Sky". It first reached the Billboard magazine charts on January 7, 1956. It peaked at #31 on the composite chart of the top 100 songs.

The melody of the song is borrowed from the tenor aria usually known by its Italian title, "M'appari", composed in 1847 by the German Friedrich von Flotow. It was written for his opera L'Ame en Peine, but famous for its inclusion in his best-known work, Martha. The melody appears as part of the background music in Alfred Hitchcock's 1954 film Rear Window.
