= Anytime, Any Place, Anywhere =

Single by Joe Morris and His Orchestra
- B-side: "Come Back Daddy, Daddy"
- Released: August 12, 1950
- Recorded: 1950
- Genre: R&B
- Length: 3:02
- Label: Boston Records
- Songwriter(s): L Tate, Joe Morris

Joe Morris and His Orchestra singles chronology
"Anytime, Any Place, Anywhere" (1950)	"Pack Up All Your Rags" (1951)

"Anytime, Any Place, Anywhere" is the 1950 debut single by Joe Morris and His Orchestra. Joe Morris' debut single was his most successful on three entries on the R&B chart. "Anytime, Any Place, Anywhere" featured vocals by Laurie Tate and hit number one on the R&B charts.
