= It Hurts Me to My Heart =

Song by Faye Adams
- B-side: "Ain't Gonna Tell"
- Released: August 1954
- Genre: R&B
- Length: 3:01
- Label: Herald Records
- Songwriter(s): Rose Marie McCoy; Charles Singleton

Faye Adams singles chronology
"Somewhere, Somebody, Someday / Crazy Mixed-Up World" (1954)	"It Hurts Me to My Heart" (1954)	"Ain't Nothin to Play With / I Owe My Heart To You" (1954)

"It Hurts Me to My Heart" is a 1954 single by Faye Adams. The song, written by Rose Marie McCoy and Charles Singleton, was the final of Adams's three number ones on the R&B Best Sellers chart in the United States.
