= Tierra bendita y divina =

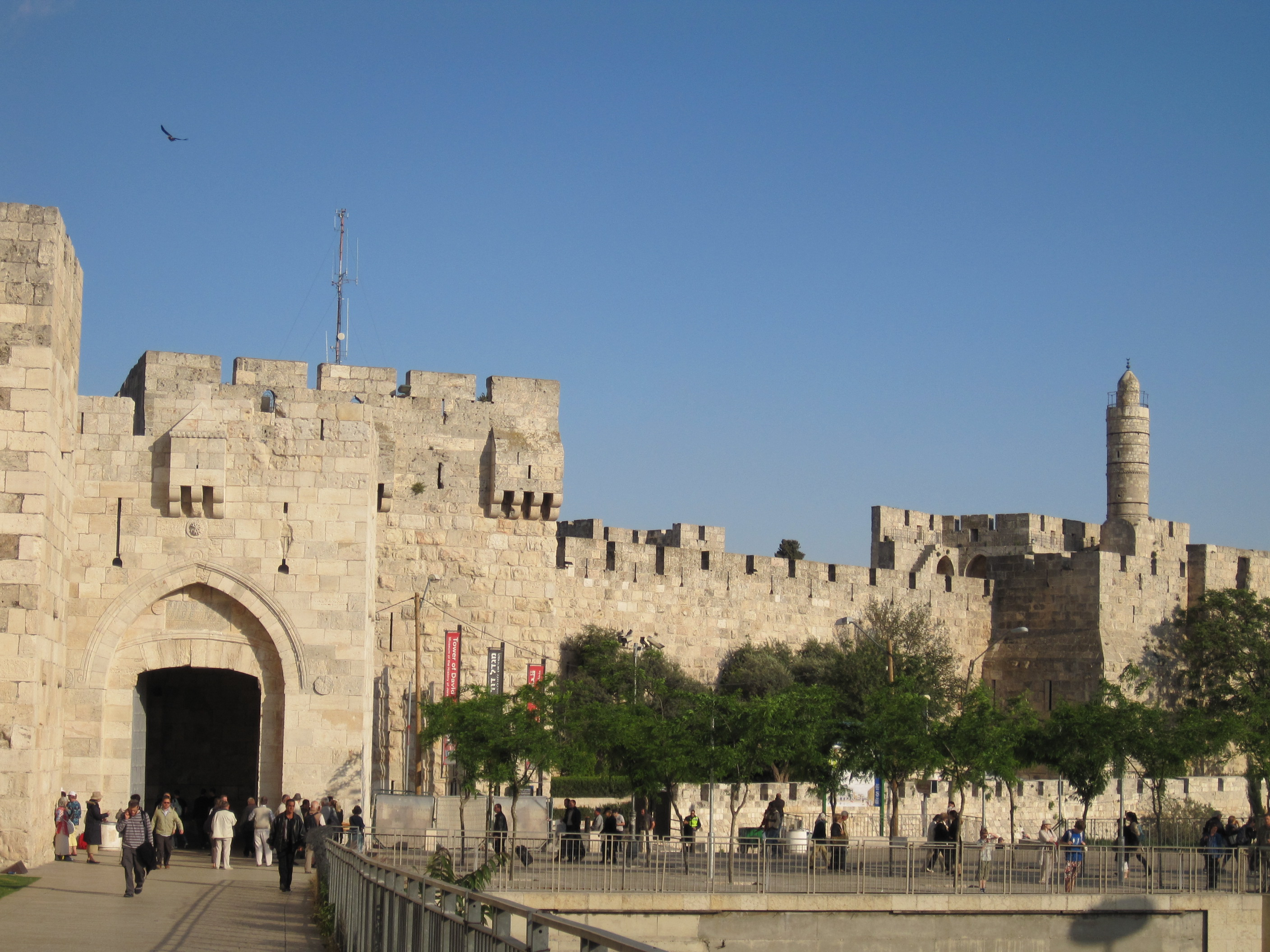
- The Jaffa Gate possibly inspired a line of the hymn from Cuba.
- English: "Blessed and Divine Land"
- Genre: Hymn
- Text: by Alejandro Tabales Santiago
- Language: Spanish
- Melody: by Robert C. Savage
- Published: 1954

"Tierra bendita y divina" (English: "Blessed and Divine Land"), also known as "Tierra de la Palestina" (English: "Land of Palestine"), is a traditional Spanish language Christian hymn derived from Cuba and composed by Robert C. Savage in 1954. It describes the land of Palestine and the details of Jesus' life, and references several historical Israelite sites, including the Western Wall, the Mount of Beatitudes, and the Jaffa Gate.

== Lyrics ==
These are the lyrics in Spanish:

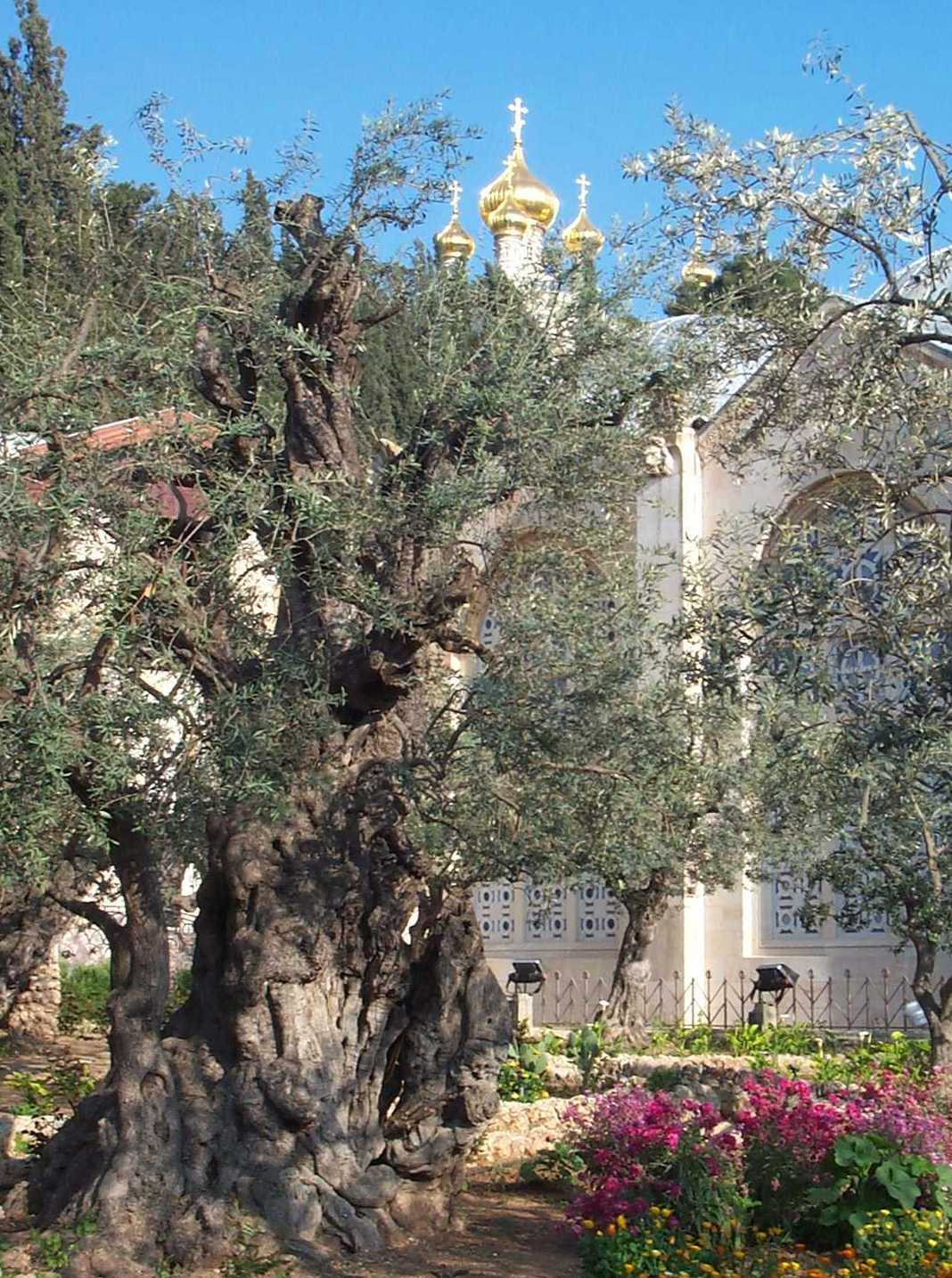
The line "Y en tus hermoso olivares," refers to the Olive trees of Israel.

Spanish lyrics: Tierra bendita y divina es la de Palestina donde nació Jesús; Eres, de las naciones, cumbre bañada por la lumbre que derramó su luz. Coro Eres la historia inolvidable, Porque en tu seno se derramó La sangre, preciosa sangre, Del unigénito Hijo de Dios. Cuenta la historia del pasado que en tu seno sagrado vivió el Salvador, Y en tus hermoso olivares, habló a los millares la palabra de amor. Quedan en ti testigos mudos, que son los viejos muros de la Jerusalén; Viejas paredes ya destruidas, que si tuvieran vida, nos hablarían bien.	English translation: Blessed and divine land is that of Palestine where Jesus was born; You are the summit of all nations bathed by the fire that His light has shed Chorus You are the unforgettable story, For in thy bosom spilled The blood, the precious blood Of the only-begotten son of God. Ancient history has it That in thy sacred bosom The Saviour lived, And in your beautiful olive groves, He spoke to thousands of people The word of love. Silent witnesses are in you, Which are those old walls of Jerusalem; Old walls since destroyed, That if they were alive, Would tell us the story.
