= The Chords (American band) =

American doo-wop group

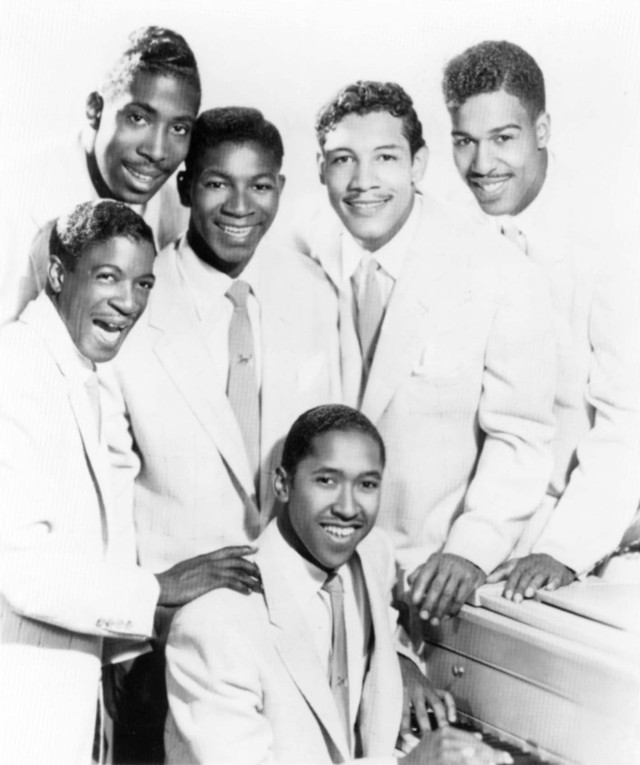
- The Chords c. 1955; Standing (l-r): Claude Feaster, William Edwards, Carl Feaster; Jimmy Keyes, Buddy McRae. * Sitting: Rupert Branker

Background information
- Origin: The Bronx, New York City, U.S.
- Genres: Doo-wop; R&B
- Years active: 1951–1980
- Labels: Atlantic; Vik
- Past members: Carl Feaster; Claude Feaster; Jimmy Keyes; Floyd McRae; William Edwards; Rupert Branker; Joe Dias; Arthur Dicks

The Chords were an American doo-wop vocal group formed in 1951 in The Bronx, known for their 1954 hit "Sh-Boom", which they wrote. It is the only song they created that reached mainstream popularity.

== Career ==
The group was formed by friends from a high school based in the Bronx, New York City, United States. The initial members were the brothers Carl and Claude Feaster, plus Jimmy Keyes, Buddy McRae, and William Edwards, with support from the pianist Rupert Branker. The Chords were one of the early acts to be signed to Cat Records, a subsidiary label of Atlantic Records.

Their debut single was a doo-wop version of a Patti Page song "Cross Over the Bridge", and the record label reluctantly allowed a number penned by the Chords on the B-side. That track was "Sh-Boom", which quickly became the more popular side. The record reached the top 10 of the U.S. pop chart, which was then a unique occurrence for an R&B number. The track was covered by The Crew-Cuts, who took the song to the top of the charts, arguably registering the first U.S. rock and roll number one hit record.

The enthusiasm doo-wop fans had for the Chords' music was dampened when Gem Records claimed that one of the groups on its roster was called the Chords; consequently, the group changed their name to the Chordcats. Their success was a one-off as subsequent releases, including "Zippity-Zum", all failed to chart. A round of personnel changes and recordings on a variety of labels all failed to reignite the public's interest.

== Members ==
- Carl Albert Feaster, lead (September 14, 1930 – January 10, 1981)
- Claude Feaster, baritone (September 23, 1933 – November 1978)
- James "Jimmy" Keyes, first tenor (May 22, 1930 – July 22, 1995)
- Floyd Franklin "Buddy" McRae Jr., second tenor (October 1, 1927 – March 19, 2013)
- William "Ricky" Edwards, bass (1919-1964)

Pianist Rupert Branker was murdered on July 3, 1961.

Later bass singer Joe "Ditto" Dias, who replaced William Edwards, died sometime in the 1960s.

Later tenor/baritone Arthur Dicks, who briefly replaced Buddy McRae, died on April 25, 1998.

Buddy McRae, the last surviving original member, died on March 19, 2013, at a nursing home in the Bronx at the age of 85.

== Discography ==
=== Compilation albums ===
Title	Details
The Best Of The Chords	Released in 2005 by Cat

=== Singles ===
==== 1950s ====
Title	Year	Peak chart positions		
Title	Year	US R&B	US	US CB
"Cross over the Bridge"	1954	—	—	—
"Sh-Boom"	1954	2	5	1
"Zippity Zum (I'm In Love)"	1954	—	—	—
"A Girl to Love"	1954	—	—	—
"Pretty Wild" (recorded on February 23,1955; unreleased)	1955			
"Love Oh Love" (recorded on February 23, 1955; unreleased)	1955			
"Heartbeat" (recorded on February 23, 1955; unreleased)	1955			
"Could It Be"	1955	—	—	—
"Lu Lu" (recorded on February 23, 1955; released in 1957)	1957			
"I Don't Want to Set the World on Fire"	1957	—	—	—

==== 1960s ====
1960 – "Blue Moon"

== See also ==
- List of doo-wop musicians
- First rock and roll record
- List of one-hit wonders in the United States
