= Sh-Boom =

1954 single by The Chords

"Sh-Boom (Life Could Be a Dream)"

Single by the Chords
- A-side: "Cross Over the Bridge"
- B-side: "Little Maiden"
- Released: April 1954
- Recorded: March 15, 1954
- Genre: Doo-wop; rhythm and blues
- Length: 2:26
- Label: Cat
- Songwriter: James Keyes, Claude & Carl Feaster, Floyd F. McRae, William Edwards

Audio
- "Sh-Boom" on YouTube

"Sh-Boom" ("Life Could Be a Dream") is a doo-wop song by the R&B vocal group the Chords. It was written by James Keyes, Claude Feaster, Carl Feaster, Floyd F. McRae, and William Edwards, members of the Chords, and was released in 1954. It is sometimes considered the first doo-wop or rock and roll record to reach the top ten on the pop charts (as opposed to the R&B charts), as it was a top-10 hit that year for both the Chords (who first recorded the song) and the Crew-Cuts. In 2004, it was ranked No. 215 on Rolling Stone's "Top 500 Best Songs of All Time".

== History ==
The song was written and first recorded on Atlantic Records' subsidiary label Cat Records by the R&B group the Chords on March 15, 1954, and would be their only hit song. The group reportedly auditioned the song for famed record producer Bobby Robinson while he was sick in bed, but he rejected them, stating the song "wasn't commercial enough". When the Chords recorded their debut single for Cat Records, a cover of Patti Page's "Cross Over the Bridge", the label reluctantly allowed them to record "Sh-Boom" for the B-side with Sam "the Man" Taylor on saxophone. "Sh-Boom" would eventually overshadow "Cross Over the Bridge", reaching No. 2 on the Billboard R&B charts and peaking at No. 9 on the pop charts. It was later released by Cat as an A-side, coupled with another Chords original, "Little Maiden".

A more traditional pop version was made by an all-white Canadian group, the Crew-Cuts (with the David Carroll Orchestra), for Mercury Records and was No. 1 on the Billboard charts for nine weeks during August and September 1954. The single first entered the charts on July 30, 1954, and stayed for 20 weeks. The Crew-Cuts performed the song on Ed Sullivan's Toast of the Town on December 12, 1954.

== Other recordings ==
Stan Freberg recorded a combined spoof of "Sh-Boom" and Marlon Brando because he felt that they both mumbled, in 1954. It reached No. 14 in the US and 15 in the UK. The Billy Williams Quartet released a version in 1954 on Coral Records that reached No. 21 on the Billboard Hot 100, with orchestra directed by Jack Pleis.

Bloodstone recorded an a cappella cover of the song for their 1975 movie Train Ride to Hollywood. The Harvard Din & Tonics have recordings of the song (arranged by Patrick Whelan) on most of their albums, and sing it near universally at their performances, inviting alumni from the audience to sing with them on stage.

== In popular culture ==
In the 1989 film Road House, Dalton (Patrick Swayze) first encounters Brad Wesley (Ben Gazzara) driving recklessly along a country road in his direction while singing along to the Crew-Cuts' version of the song, and narrowly missing him.

The song is also featured in the 2006 Pixar animated sports comedy film Cars in a scene in which Lightning McQueen and the citizens of Radiator Springs are cruising through the town when he helps light up the places before a media press come and find him and take him for his race in Los Angeles.
