= Guitar Slim =

American guitarist (1926–1959)

Background information
- Born: Eddie Jones; December 10, 1926; Greenwood, Mississippi, U.S.
- Died: February 7, 1959 (aged 32) New York City, U.S.
- Genres: Blues; R&B; rock and roll
- Occupation: Musician
- Instruments: Guitar; vocals
- Years active: 1940s–1959
- Labels: Speciality; Imperial; Bullet; Atco

Eddie Jones (December 10, 1926 – February 7, 1959), known as Guitar Slim, was an American guitarist in the 1940s and 1950s, best known for the million-selling song "The Things That I Used to Do", for Specialty Records. It is listed in the Rock and Roll Hall of Fame's 500 Songs That Shaped Rock and Roll. Slim had a major impact on rock and roll and experimented with distorted tones on the electric guitar a full decade before Jimi Hendrix.

== Biography ==
=== Early life ===
Jones was born in Greenwood, Mississippi. His mother died when he was five, and he was raised by his grandmother. In his teen years, he worked in cotton fields and spent his free time at juke joints, where he started sitting in as a singer or dancer; he was good enough as a dancer that he was nicknamed "Limber Leg".

=== Recording career ===
After returning from military service during World War II, he started playing in clubs around New Orleans, Louisiana. Bandleader Willie D. Warren introduced him to the guitar. He was particularly influenced by T-Bone Walker and Clarence "Gatemouth" Brown. About 1950 he adopted the stage name Guitar Slim and became known for his wild stage act. He wore bright-colored suits and dyed his hair to match them. He had an assistant who followed him around the audience with up to 350 feet of cord between his guitar and his amplifier, and occasionally rode on his assistant's shoulders or even took his guitar outside the club, bringing traffic to a stop. His sound was just as unusual—he played his guitar with distortion more than a decade before rock guitarists did, and his gospel-influenced vocals were easily identifiable.

He got together with Muddy Waters in Los Angeles, California, for some lively playing.

=== Recordings ===
Guitar Slim – "The Things That I Used to Do" (1953)
Guitar Slim's "The Things That I Used to Do" (1953) featured an early example of an electric guitar solo with distorted overtones.

His first recording session was in 1951. He had a minor rhythm and blues hit in 1952 with "Feelin' Sad", which Ray Charles covered. His biggest success was "The Things That I Used to Do" (1954), produced by the young Ray Charles and released by Art Rupe's Specialty Records. The song spent weeks at number one on the Billboard R&B chart and sold over a million copies, soon becoming a blues standard. It also contributed to the development of soul music. He recorded for several labels, including Imperial, Bullet, Specialty, and Atco.

=== Death and legacy ===
Jones died of pneumonia in New York City, at the age of 32. He is buried in a small cemetery in Thibodaux, Louisiana, where his manager, Hosea Hill, resided.

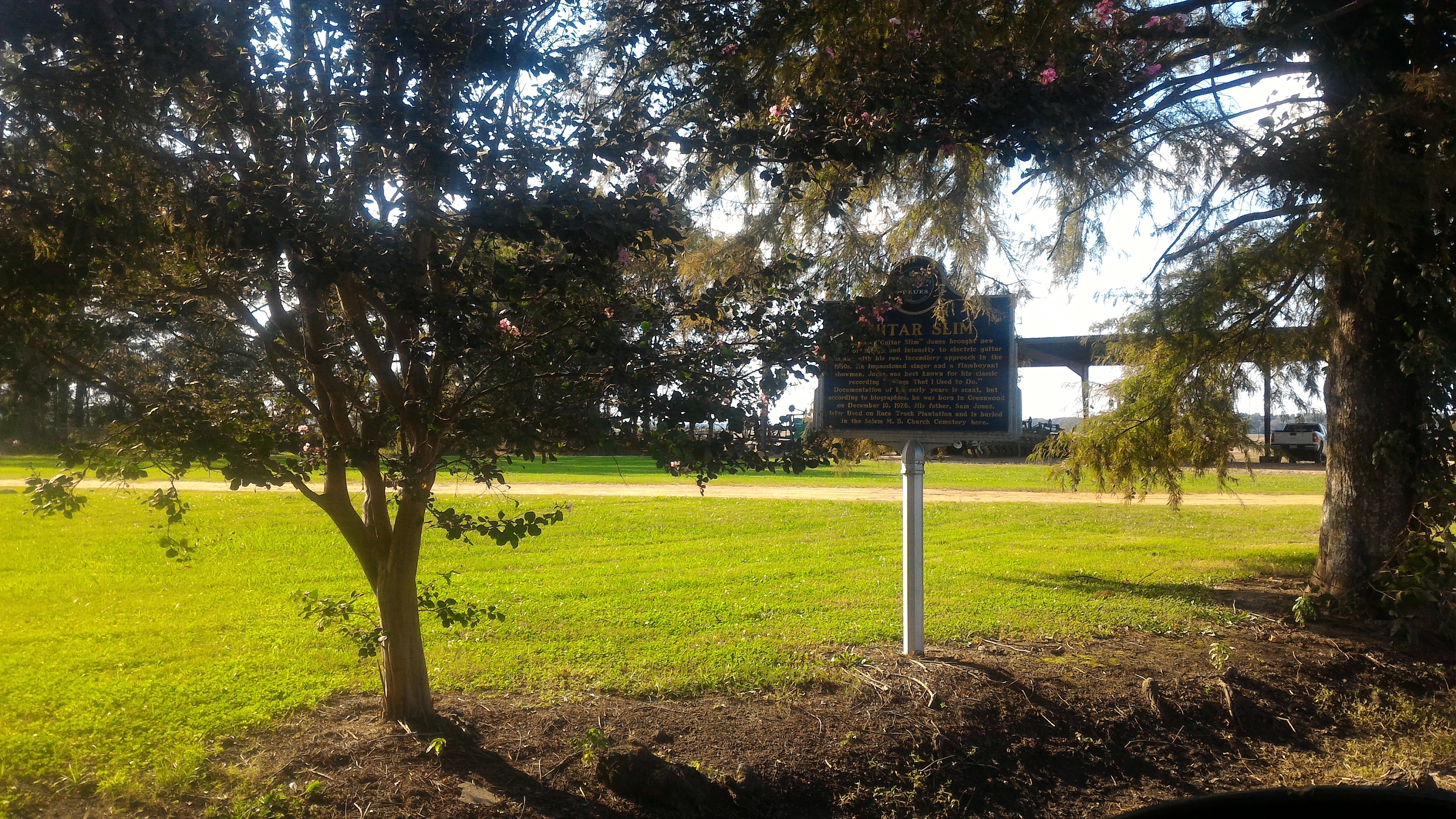
Guitar Slim Mississippi Blues Trail marker

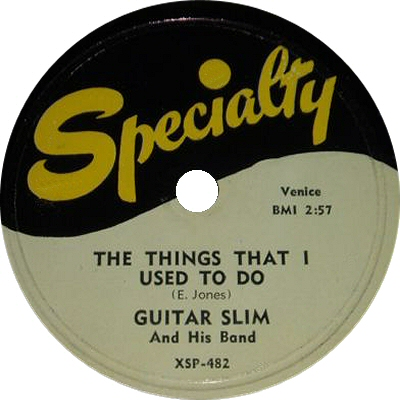
Guitar Slim The Things I used to do

Buddy Guy, Albert Collins and Frank Zappa were influenced by Guitar Slim.

Other musicians have used the nickname "Guitar Slim." The North Carolina blues guitarist James Stephens had several releases under this billing. One of Jones's sons bills himself as Guitar Slim Jr. around the New Orleans circuit. His repertoire includes many of his father's songs.

New Orleans R&B artist, Al Reed, said "I think [Jones] had a greater impact on the electric sound than any other guitarist...he could exhilarate you, he would lift you above and beyond clouds as he played, he would create sensations within your body that really played tricks with your mind. He was the first man to do this.”
