= Oh What a Dream =

Single by Ruth Brown

from the album Rock & Roll
- B-side: "Please Don't Freeze"
- Released: June 1954
- Genre: Rhythm and blues
- Length: 2:52
- Label: Atlantic
- Songwriter: Chuck Willis

Ruth Brown singles chronology
"If I Had Any Sense" (1954)	"Oh What a Dream" (1954)	"Somebody Touched Me" (1954)

"Oh What a Dream" is a 1954 blues song written by Chuck Willis and originally performed by Ruth Brown backed by members of The Drifters (only credited as her Rhythmakers). The single was Brown's fourth number one on the U.S. R&B chart.

== Song Background ==
The song has been described as a torch song with a gospel tint, adding up to a big dose of that R&B balladeering as expressed in the lyrics and Brown's soulful performance:

"Dreamed I held you in my arms

But I'm still waiting for that day to come

Ohh what a dream, what a dream I had last night"

== Cover versions ==
- Patti Page had an August 1954 single release of the song - as "What a Dream" - which reached #10 pop.
- In 1960, Conway Twitty had a minor pop hit with his version of the song.
