= The Crew-Cuts =

1950s Canadian pop and doo wop band

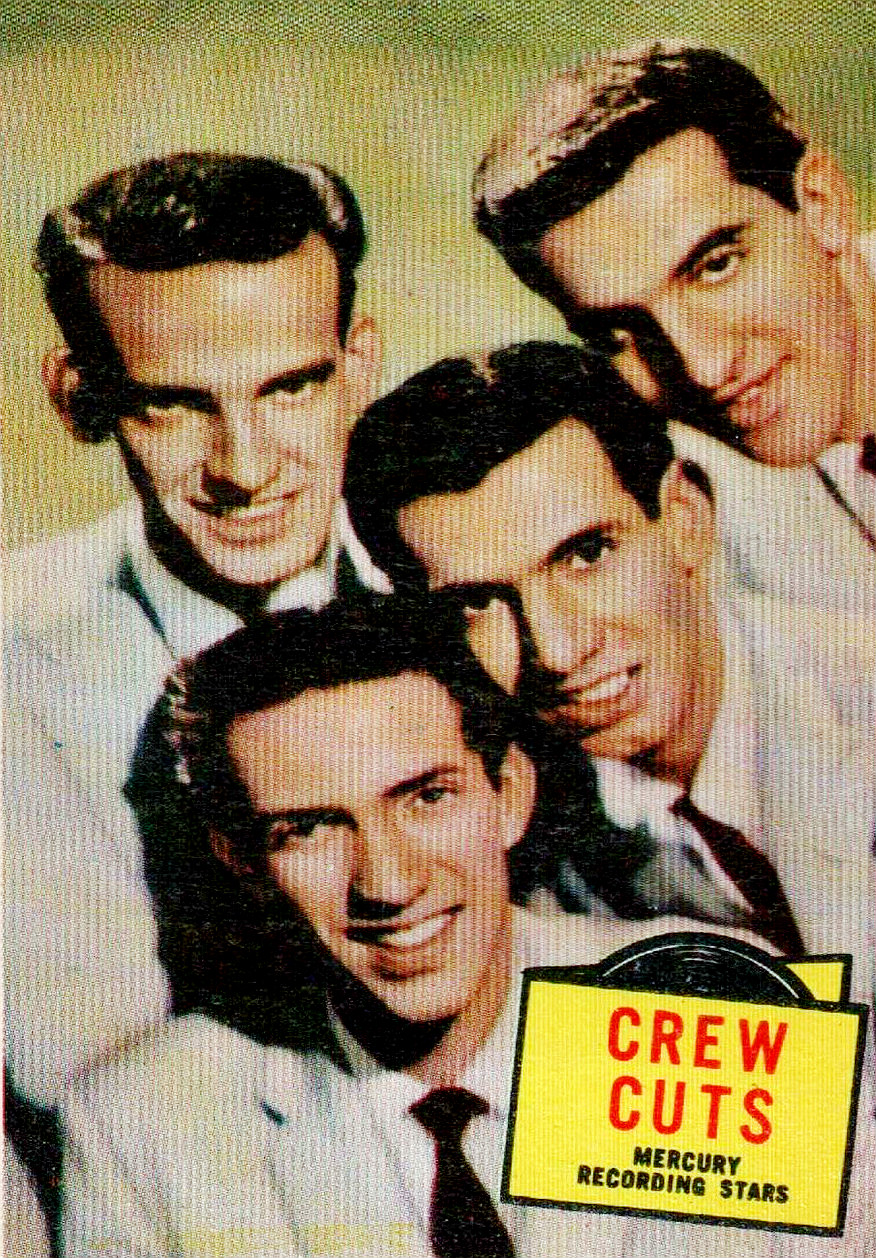
- The group in 1957: Pat (left), Rudi (top right), Johnny (center), and Ray (bottom)

Background information
- Origin: Toronto, Ontario, Canada
- Genres: Traditional pop, doo-wop, big band
- Years active: 1952–1964
- Labels: Mercury, RCA Victor, Camay
- Past members: Rudi Maugeri; John Perkins; Ray Perkins; Pat Barrett

The Crew-Cuts (sometimes spelled Crew Cuts or Crewcuts) were a Canadian vocal and doowop quartet, that made a number of popular records that charted in the United States and worldwide. They were most famous for their recording of the Chords' hit record "Sh-Boom".

The Crewcuts along with the Four Lads and the Diamonds were inducted into the Canadian Hall of Fame in 1984.

== Group members ==
- Rudi Maugeri (died 2004, lead and baritone)
- John Perkins (lead and tenor)
- Ray Perkins (bass)
- Pat Barrett (died 2016, lead and tenor)

== Biography ==
They all had been members of the St. Michael's Choir School in Toronto, which also spawned another famous quartet, the Four Lads. Maugeri, John Perkins, and two others (Bernard Toorish and Connie Codarini) who later were among the Four Lads first formed a group called the Jordonaires (not to be confused with a similarly named group, the Jordanaires, that was known for singing backup vocals on Elvis Presley's hits) and also the Otnorots ("Toronto" spelled backwards), but they split from the group to finish high school. When the Four Lads returned to Toronto for a homecoming concert, John Perkins and Maugeri ran into each other and decided that they could themselves have a musical future. They joined with Barrett and Ray Perkins in March 1952. The group was originally called the Four Tones.

A Toronto disk jockey, Barry Nesbitt, put them on his weekly teen show, whose audience gave the group a new name, the Canadaires. All four of the members were at the time working at jobs with the Ontario government, but quit to sing full-time. They worked clubs in the Niagara Falls area, but saved up their money and drove to New York City, so they could appear on Arthur Godfrey's television and radio program, Talent Scouts, where they came in second to a comedian. While they did get a record with Thrillwood Records and recorded a song titled "Chip, Chip Sing A Song Little Sparrow", this led to no improvement in their fortune, however, and they continued playing minor night clubs.

In March 1953, they returned to Toronto and appeared as an opening act for Gisele MacKenzie at the Casino Theatre. She was impressed with them and commented favorably to her record label, but could not remember the group's name.

They were playing in a Sudbury, Ontario, night club in a sub-zero Canadian winter when they received notice that they had been invited to appear as a guest on a Cleveland television program. They drove 600 miles in -40° temperatures to appear on the Gene Carroll show, where they remained for three appearances. While in Cleveland, they met local disc jockey Bill Randle. On his show, on Cleveland radio station WERE (1300 AM), he coined the name that would, from that point on, belong to the group. In addition, Randle arranged for them to audition with Mercury Records, who liked them enough to sign the quartet to a contract.

Although their first hit, "Crazy 'Bout You, Baby", was written by Maugeri and Barrett themselves, they quickly became specialists in cover recordings of originally-R&B songs. Their first cover, "Sh-Boom" (of which the R&B original was recorded by The Chords) hit number one on the U.S. charts in 1954. It sold over a million copies. A number of other hits followed including "Earth Angel" which rose to the number 2 spot on the charts and had great success in the UK and Australia. Many of the non-cover songs of theirs that became hits in Canada were unknown in the United States, while it was only their covers that had great success in the United States.

In the week beginning 19 September 1955, they played six nights at Liverpool Empire, in Liverpool, United Kingdom. A 12-year-old George Harrison was among the crowd on one of those nights, and a 13-year-old Paul McCartney got an autograph from them.

The group moved from Mercury to RCA Records in 1958 and eventually broke up in 1964, but they all moved to the U.S. and reunited in Nashville, Tennessee, in 1977. In the 1990s they were inducted into the Juno Hall of Fame. In recent years, the three remaining members (Rudi Maugeri died in 2004) appeared on a Public Broadcasting Service special filmed at Atlantic City's Trump Taj Mahal. The program, "Magic Moments: The Best of '50s Pop", continues to air as part of the fundraising efforts for PBS.

A remix of their version of the song "Sh-Boom" was featured in the credits of the video game Destroy All Humans!. The original recording of their song "Sh-Boom" can also be heard on one of the in-game radio stations in Mafia II.

In later years, Rudi Maugeri became a music director of one of the music syndication companies, Radio Arts in Burbank, California. The company supplied music on ten-inch reels of audiotape for use in radio station automation systems and for "Live Assist" use, around the world. Maugeri selected and issued a playlist every week for the company. His record of picking hit songs for syndication was in the upper 90% and record promoters had Radio Arts on their list of 'must see' companies because Radio Arts provided music to hundreds of stations weekly.

== Discography ==
=== Singles ===
Year	Single	Chart positions				
Year	Single	US	CB	UK	AU	BE
1953	"Twinkle Toes"	-	-	-	-	-
1954	"The Barking Dog"	-	19	-	-	-
1954	"I Spoke Too Soon"	24	49	-	-	-
1954	"Crazy 'Bout Ya Baby"	8	11	-	-	-
1954	"Oop Shoop"	13	13	-	-	8
1954	"Sh-Boom"	1	1	12	1	3
1955	"The Whiffenpoof Song"	-	-	-	-	-
1955	"Earth Angel"	3	2	4	-	-
1955	"Ko Ko Mo (I Love You So)"	6	3	-	13	3
1955	"Two Hearts, Two Kisses"	-	-	-	9	-
1955	"Chop Chop Boom"	flip	41	-	-	-
1955	"Carmen's Boogie"	-	42	-	4	-
1955	"Angels in the Sky"	11	10	-	36	-
1955	"Don't Be Angry"	14	9	-	-	-
1955	"A Story Untold"	16	14	-	-	-
1955	"Song of the Fool"	-	-	-	46	-
1955	"Gum Drop" b/w "Present Arms"	10	10	-	25	-
1955	"Slam Bam"	-	48	-	-	-
1955	"Are You Havin' Any Fun?"	-	49	-	-	-
1955	"Unchained Melody"	-	-	-	-	-
1955	"Mostly Martha"	31	33	-	-	-
1956	"Seven Days" b/w "That's Your Mistake"	18	21	-	-	-
1956	"Tell Me Why"	45	38	-	-	-
1956	"Bei Mir Bist Du Schon"	-	-	-	-	-
1956	"Out of the Picture"	-	49	-	-	-
1956	"Love in a Home"	-	-	-	-	-
1956	"The Halls of Ivy"	-	-	-	-	-
1957	"Young Love"	17	-	-	-	-
1957	"Whatever, Whenever, Whoever"	-	-	-	-	-
1957	"Susie Q"	-	-	-	-	-
1957	"I Sit in the Window"	-	-	-	-	-
1957	"I Like It Like That"	-	-	-	-	-
1957	"Be My Only Love"	-	-	-	-	-
1958	"Hey, Stella (Who Zat Down Your Cellar?)"	-	82	-	85	-
1959	"Over the Mountain"	-	-	-	-	-
1959	"The Legend of Gunga Din"	-	-	-	-	-

== See also ==
- Music of Canada
- Canadian Music Hall of Fame
