= The Things That I Used to Do =

1953 blues standard by Guitar Slim

Single by Guitar Slim
- B-side: "Well, I Done Got Over It"
- Released: 1953
- Recorded: 1953
- Studio: J&M (New Orleans, Louisiana)
- Genre: Blues; electric blues; New Orleans blues
- Length: 2:57
- Label: Specialty
- Songwriter: Eddie Jones a.k.a. Guitar Slim
- Producer: Ray Charles

Guitar Slim singles chronology
"Feelin' Sad" (1952)	"The Things That I Used to Do" (1953)	"Sum'thin' to Remember You By" (1954)

Audio sample
- file; help

"The Things That I Used to Do" is a blues standard written by Guitar Slim. He recorded it at Cosimo Matassa's J&M Recording Studio in New Orleans, where the young Ray Charles arranged and produced the session. Specialty Records released the song as a single in 1953 and it became a bestseller the following year. Specialty founder Art Rupe believed that the appeal would be limited to the Southern U.S. rural audience. However, urban rhythm and blues radio stations in the North began airing the song and built it into a national hit. As a result, Guitar Slim became in great demand as a performer and played at venues such as the Apollo Theater in New York City.

The single was one of the biggest hits in Specialty's history and stayed on the Billboard's Rhythm and Blues Records charts for 42 weeks. The song remained at number one for six weeks and was the best-selling R&B record of the year, selling more than a million copies.

== Composition and recording ==
Charles' arrangement and piano accompaniment emphasize the religious tone of intense but philosophical regret in the singer's voice, giving the song a gospel-influenced feel. Like Fats Domino, Guitar Slim had a voice with a less adult sound than that of the typical blues shouters of the time, and his lyrics are less explicitly sexual.

== Influence and recognition ==
The Rock and Roll Hall of Fame included the tune on its list of the "500 Songs That Shaped Rock and Roll". Stylistically, the song also contributed to the development of soul music. In addition, the song was a success, thus influencing rock and roll by demonstrating the commercial success of using content that appeals to white listeners and by the effectiveness of its gospel feel. The song had a major impact on the "electric sound" of rock music and featured distorted overtones on the electric guitar a full decade before Jimi Hendrix. Guitar Slim was a favorite of Hendrix, who recorded an impromptu version with guitarist Johnny Winter on slide guitar in 1969. It was officially released on the compilation Both Sides of the Sky (2018).

"The Things That I Used to Do" became a standard as a result of Guitar Slim's distinctive guitar figuring and the rising and falling melody. Blues historian Gerard Herzhaft noted that it "remains a classic of the New Orleans blues [which] was covered by Pee Wee Crayton, Tina Turner, Lonnie Brooks, and Joe Turner". In 1964, a version by James Brown cracked the Billboard Hot 100 at number 99 (the magazine's R&B chart was suspended at the time).
