= Faye Adams =

American singer (1923–2016)

- Fay Adams in 1953

Background information
- Also known as: Faye Scruggs; Fannie Jones
- Born: Fanny Tuell; May 22, 1923; Essex County, New Jersey, U.S.
- Died: November 2, 2016 (aged 93)
- Genres: Gospel, rhythm and blues
- Occupation: Singer
- Years active: Performance career started 1928 on radio, recording 1952-1976
- Labels: Atlantic; Herald; Imperial; Savoy Records
- Award: Rhythm and Blues Foundation - Pioneer award (1998)

Faye Adams (born Fanny Tuell, May 22, 1923 – November 2, 2016), who also performed under the stage names Faye Scruggs and Fannie Jones and Atomic Adams, was an American singer who recorded and performed gospel and rhythm and blues. She had several chart hits in the early 1950s, in the Billboard rhythm and blues record chart chart and continued to record until the late 1970s, and was also a songwriter.

== Life and career ==
=== Early life ===
Fanny Tuell was born in Essex County, New Jersey, of African descent the daughter of Naomi Edwardsand David Tuell who was a gospel singer and a key figure in the Church of God in Christ (COGIC).

=== Music career ===
Tuell started performing the age of five with her sisters singing spirituals, regularly performing on Newark radio shows. She entered an Apollo Theatre singing contest and won first prize in 1939. In 1942 she married her first husband, Tommy Scruggs, who became her business manager. Under her married name, Faye Scruggs, she became a regular performer in New York nightclubs in the late 1940s and early 1950s.

While performing in Atlanta, Georgia, she was discovered by the singer Ruth Brown, who won her an audition with the bandleader Joe Morris of Atlantic Records. Morris recruited her as a singer in 1952, and signed her to Herald Records, under new management by her former vocal coach Phil Moore. After he changed her name to Faye Adams, she released her second recording and first release at Herald with Morris's song "Shake a Hand". The recording topped the US Billboard R&B chart for ten weeks in 1953 and reached number 22 on the US pop chart. It sold one million copies and was awarded a gold disc.

According to the Acoustic Music organization, the "first clear evidence of soul music shows up with The "5" Royales, an ex-gospel group that turned to R&B and in Faye Adams, whose "Shake A Hand" becomes an R&B standard".

In 1954, Adams had two more R&B chart toppers with "I'll Be True" (later covered by Bill Haley in 1954 and by a young Jackie DeShannon in 1957) and "It Hurts Me to My Heart". During this period, she left the Morris band and was billed as "Atomic Adams". She appeared in the 1955 film Rhythm & Blues Revue. In 1957 she moved to Imperial Records, but her commercial success diminished. By the late 1950s she was seen as an older recording artist whose time had come and gone, although she continued to record for various small labels until the early 1960s and 70s. DJ Alan Freed called Adams the "little gal with the big voice" and she toured in the Rhythm and Blues Show Tours, which also featured The Drifters, The Counts and The Spaniels.

=== Later life and death ===
Adams remarried in 1968, to second husband Clarence J. Jones, and as Fannie Jones' returned to her gospel roots and family life in New Jersey. In the 1970s, she was credited as co-writer with her husband of several gospel and secular songs, and released a single, "Sinner Man", on Savoy Records in 1975.

In February 1998, she received an award from the Rhythm and Blues Foundation, and at the time was reported to be living in England.

Adams died on November 2, 2016, at the age of 93. Although this was not covered by the media and no formal obituary was located, her death was confirmed by rhythm and blues historian Marv Goldberg through Adams' great-granddaughter, Paris Alexa Williams.

== Discography ==
=== Singles ===
Year	Label	A-side	B-side	Chart Positions	
Year	Label	A-side	B-side	US Pop	US R&B
1953	Atlantic 1007	"Sweet Talk"	"Watch Out, I Told You"	—	—
1953	Herald 416	"Shake a Hand"	"I've Gotta Leave You"	22	1
1953	Herald 419	"I'll Be True"	"Happiness to My Soul"	—	1
1954	Herald 423	"Every Day"	"Say a Prayer"	—	—
1954	Herald 429	"Somebody, Somewhere, Someday"	"Crazy Mixed-Up World"	—	—
1954	Herald 434	"It Hurts Me to My Heart"	"Ain't Gonna Tell"	—	1
1954	Herald 439	"Ain't Nothin' to Play With"	"I Owe My Heart to You"	—	—
1955	Herald 444	"Anything for a Friend"	"Your Love Has My Heart Burning"	—	—
1955	Herald 450	"You Ain't Been True"	"My Greatest Desire"	—	—
1955	Herald 462	"No Way Out"	"Same Old Me"	—	—
1956	Herald 470	"Teen-Age Heart"	"Witness to the Crime"	—	—
1956	Herald 480	"Takin' You Back"	"Don't Forget to Smile"	—	—
1956	Herald 489	"Anytime, Any Place, Anywhere"	"The Hammer Keeps Knockin'"	—	—
1957	Imperial 5443	"Keeper of My Heart"	"So Much"	—	13
1957	Imperial 5456	"Johnny Lee"	"You're Crazy"	—	—
1957	Imperial 5471	"I Have a Twinkle in My Eye"	"Someone Like You"	—	—
1958	Imperial 5525	"When We Kiss"	"Everything"	—	—
1958	Herald 512	"Shake a Hand"	"I'll Be True"	—	—

== Award ==
year	Association	Award	Results
1998	Rhythm and Blues Foundation	Pioneer Award	Won
