= Herald Records =

American record label

Herald Records was an American record label of the 1950s and 1960s.

Herald was founded in Elizabeth, New Jersey in 1952 by Fred Mendelsohn. He teamed up with Al Silver and Silver's brother-in-law, who continued Herald Records after Mendelsohn left. The company signed Lightnin' Hopkins in 1954, and The Mellowkings in 1957. Its biggest hit was "Stay" by Maurice Williams and the Zodiacs in 1960.

Herald, its sister label Ember Records and Silver's Angel Publishing business faced large tax bills in the early 1960s. Silver opted to liquidate and pay creditors who had helped him build the business, rather than seek protection through bankruptcy.
