= Billboard Top R&B Records of 1955 =

American music chart

Billboard Top R&B Records of 1955 is made up of three year-end charts compiled by Billboard magazine ranking the year's top rhythm and blues records based on record sales, disc jockey plays, and juke box plays.

Retail	Disk jockey	Juke box	Title	Artist(s)	Label
1	1	2	"Pledging My Love"	Johnny Ace	Duke
2	4	1	"Ain't That a Shame"	Fats Domino	Imperial
3	7	3	"Maybellene"	Chuck Berry	Chess
4	2	4	"Earth Angel"	The Penguins	Doontone
5	9	5	"I've Got a Woman	Ray Charles	Atlantic
6	3	15	"The Wallflower (Dance with Me, Henry)"	Etta James	Modern
7	13	14	"Only You (And You Alone)"	The Platters	Mercury
8	8	6	"My Babe"	Little Walter	Chess
9	5	7	"Sincerely"	The Moonglows	Chess
10	15	19	"Unchained Melody"	Roy Hamilton	Epic
11	6	9	"Hearts of Stone"	The Charms	DeLuxe
12	10	13	"Tweedle Dee"	LaVern Baker	Atlantic
13	NR	9	"Every Day I Have the Blues"	Count Basie Orchestra, Joe Williams	Clef
14	14	11	"It's Love, Baby (24 Hours a Day)"	Louis Brooks	Excello
15	15	12	"Flip, Flop and Fly"	Big Joe Turner	Atlantic
16	22	17	"Don't Be Angry"	Nappy Brown	Savoy
17	NR	8	"Bo Diddley"	Bo Diddley	Checker
18	17	20	"What'cha Gonna Do"	The Drifters	Atlantic
19	NR	22	"Unchained Melody"	Al Hibbler	Decca
20	NR	NR	"Story Untold"	The Nutmegs	Herald
21	NR	NR	"Soldier Boy"	The Four Fellows	Glory
22	20	23	"I Hear You Knocking"	Smiley Lewis	Imperial
23	12	16	"Fool for You"	Ray Charles	Atlantic
24	NR	25	"At My Front Door"	The El Dorados	Vee Jay
25	19	NR	"All by Myself"	Fats Domino	Imperial
NR	11	NR	"Come Back"	Ray Charles	Atlantic
NR	18	NR	"Close Your Eyes"	The Five Keys	Capitol
NR	21	NR	"Rock Around the Clock"	Bill Haley & His Comets	Decca
NR	23	NR	"Most of All"	The Moonglows	Chess
NR	24	NR	"Lonely Nights"	Hearts	Baton
NR	25	NR	"The Door Is Still Open to My Heart"	The Cardinals	Atlantic
NR	NR	18	"Reconsider Baby"	Lowell Fulson	Checker
NR	NR	21	"You Don't Have to Go"	Jimmy Reed	Vee Jay
NR	NR	24	"Feel So Good"	Shirley & Lee	Aladdin

== See also ==
- List of Billboard number-one R&B songs of 1955
- Billboard year-end top 30 singles of 1955
- 1955 in music
