= Pat Boone (album) =

Studio album by Pat Boone
- Released: May 1956
- Recorded: February – December 1955
- Studio: Universal Recording Corp. (Chicago)
- Genre: Pop
- Length: 29:03
- Label: Dot
- Producer: Randy Wood

Pat Boone chronology
Pat Boone (1956)	Howdy! (1956)

Professional ratings
Review scores
Source	Rating
AllMusic	4.5/5 stars
Billboard	positive ("Spotlight" pick)

Pat Boone is the debut album by Pat Boone. Released by Dot Records in 1956, it compiled his recent hits such as "Ain't That a Shame", "At My Front Door", "Tutti Frutti", "Gee Whittakers", "I'll Be Home", with the addition of some newly recorded material.

== Chart performance ==
The album eventually peaked at No. 20 on the Billboard Best Selling Pop LP's.

== Track listing ==
Side one
No.	Title	Writer(s)	Length
1.	"Ain't That a Shame"	Fats Domino, Dave Bartholomew	2:23
2.	"Rich in Love"	Sam M. Lewis, Pete Wendling, George W. Meyer	2:34
3.	"Two Hearts"	Otis Williams, Henry Stone	2:30
4.	"No Other Arms"	Art Crafer, Jimmy Nebb	2:13
5.	"Now I Know"	Billy Vaughn, Beasley Smith	2:15
6.	"Gee Whittakers"	Winfield Scott	2:23

Side two
No.	Title	Writer(s)	Length
1.	"At My Front Door"	John C. Moore, Ewart Abner	1:53
2.	"Take the Time"	Joe Beal, Joseph Shank, Teddy Powell	2:15
3.	"Tutti Frutti"	Dorothy LaBostrie, Little Richard	2:25
4.	"Tra-La-La"	Dave Bartholomew, Tommy Ridgley	2:45
5.	"Tennessee Saturday Night"	Bill Hughes	2:37
6.	"I'll Be Home"	Fats Washington, Stan Lewis	2:50

== Charts ==
Chart (1957)	Peak position
US Billboard Best Selling Pop LP's	20
