= List of Billboard number-one R&B songs of 1955 =

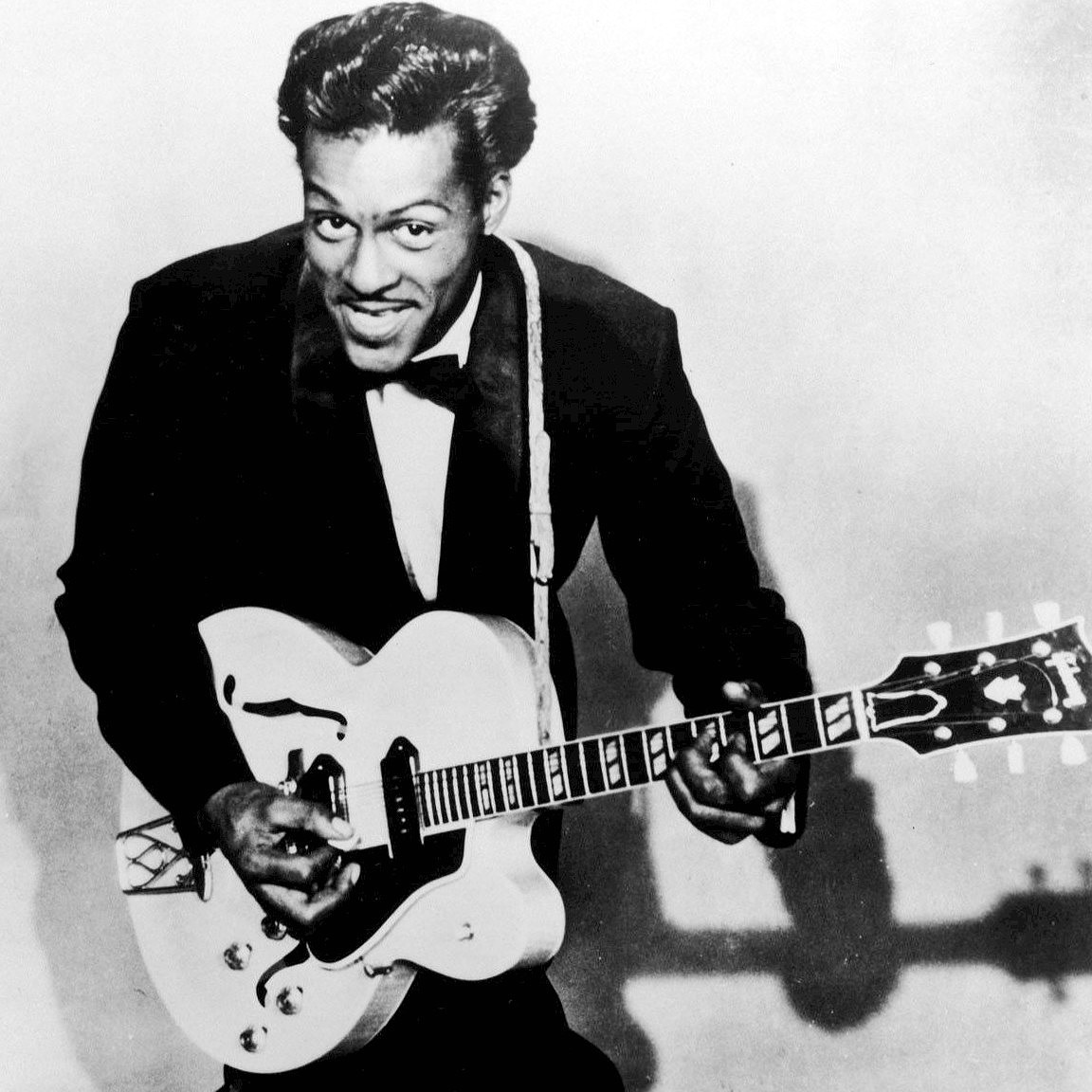
Rock and roll pioneer Chuck Berry had a lengthy run at number one on all three charts with "Maybellene".

In 1955, Billboard magazine published three charts specifically covering the top-performing songs in the United States in rhythm and blues and related African-American-oriented music genres. The Best Sellers in Stores chart ranked records based on their "current national selling importance at the retail level", based on a survey of record retailers "with a high volume of sales in rhythm and blues records". The Most Played in Juke Boxes listing was based on "plays in juke boxes thruout [sic] the country" derived from a survey of "operators using a high proportion of rhythm and blues records". The Most Played by Jockeys chart, which was first published in the issue dated January 22, ranked songs based on the "number of plays on disk jockey radio shows" according to a weekly survey of "top disk jockey shows in all key markets". The three charts are considered part of the lineage of the magazine's multimetric R&B chart launched in 1958, which since 2005 has been published under the title Hot R&B/Hip Hop Songs.

In the issue of Billboard dated January 1, "You Upset Me Baby" by B.B. King was at number one on the juke box chart and "Hearts of Stone" by the Charms held the top spot on the best sellers listing; the latter song became the first chart-topper on the jockeys chart when it was first published three weeks later. "Hearts of Stone" was among four of 1955's R&B number one songs which were also chart-toppers on Billboard's pop music charts, but in each case a different artist took the song to the top of the pop listings. At the time it was difficult for black acts to achieve sufficient crossover popularity to top the pop charts, and it was common for white acts to record cover versions of R&B songs for the mainstream market. Shortly after the Charms topped all three charts, Johnny Ace achieved the same feat with "Pledging My Love"; it was the third and final chart-topper for the singer, who had died the previous December at the age of 25.

The year's longest-running number one on both the juke box and jockeys charts was "Maybellene", the first chart-topper for Chuck Berry. The song is regarded as pivotal in the development of the emerging rock and roll genre; it was included on the Rock and Roll Hall of Fame's list of the "500 Songs That Shaped Rock and Roll", and Rolling Stone's 2021 list of the 500 Greatest Songs of All Time. The longest-running number one on the best sellers chart was "Ain't That a Shame" by Fats Domino, another pioneer of rock and roll. The song was listed on the charts as "Ain't It a Shame" because the title was printed incorrectly on the single. The year's final number one on the best sellers listing was "Hands Off" by Priscilla Bowman with Jay McShann and his Orchestra. Despite selling sufficiently in the rhythm and blues market to top this chart, the song did not enter Billboard's pop charts at all; not until 1976 would another R&B chart-topper fail to reach even the lowest position of the pop listing.

== Chart history ==
Beginning with the April 9 issue, Billboard sometimes listed both sides of a single jointly at number one on the Best Sellers and Juke Box charts, based on a methodology which combined the survey data for both songs if "significant action [was] reported on both sides of a record". This does not indicate that the single was officially released or promoted as a double A-side.

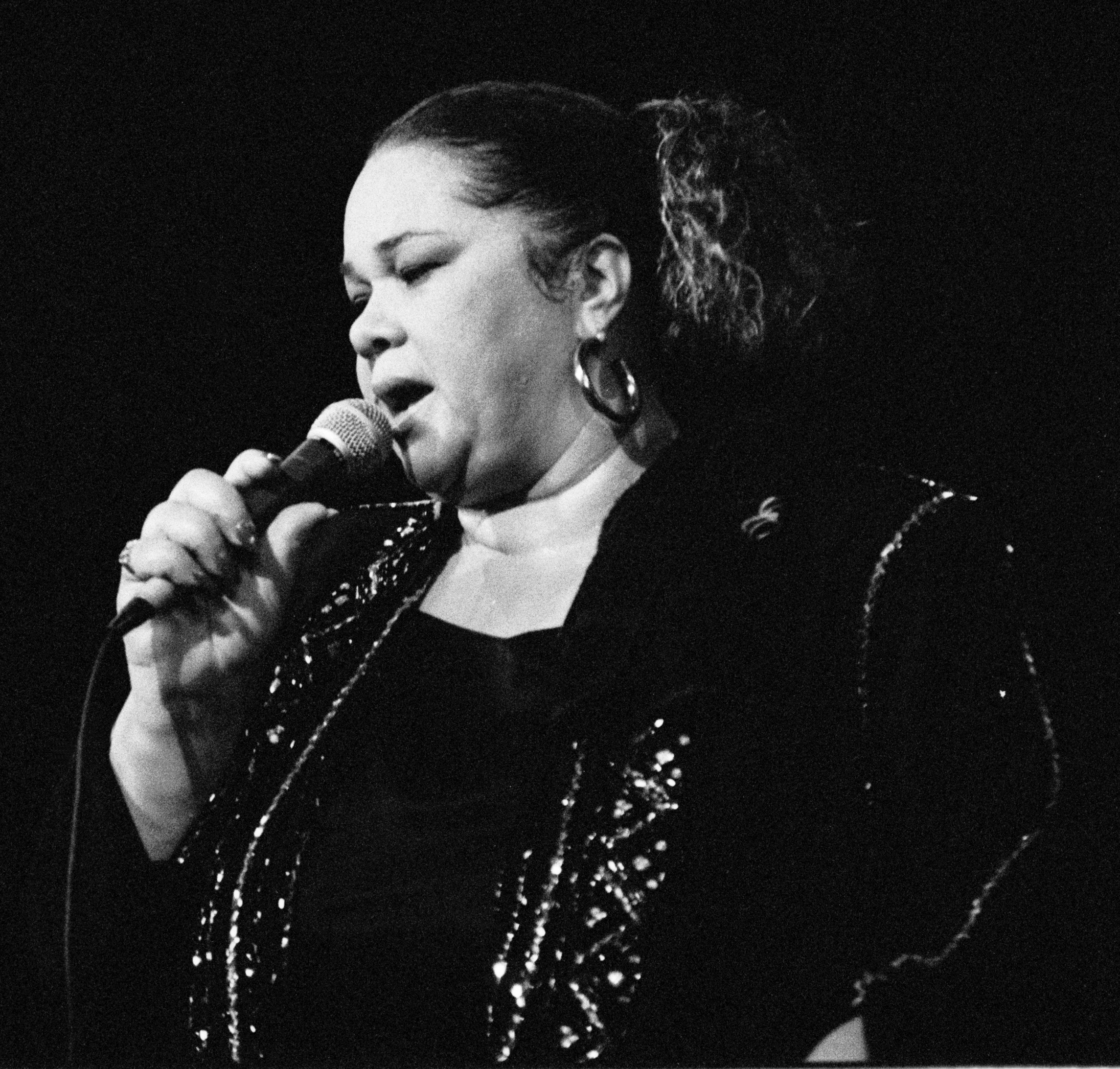
Etta James (pictured in 1990) reached number one on the jockeys chart with "The Wallflower".

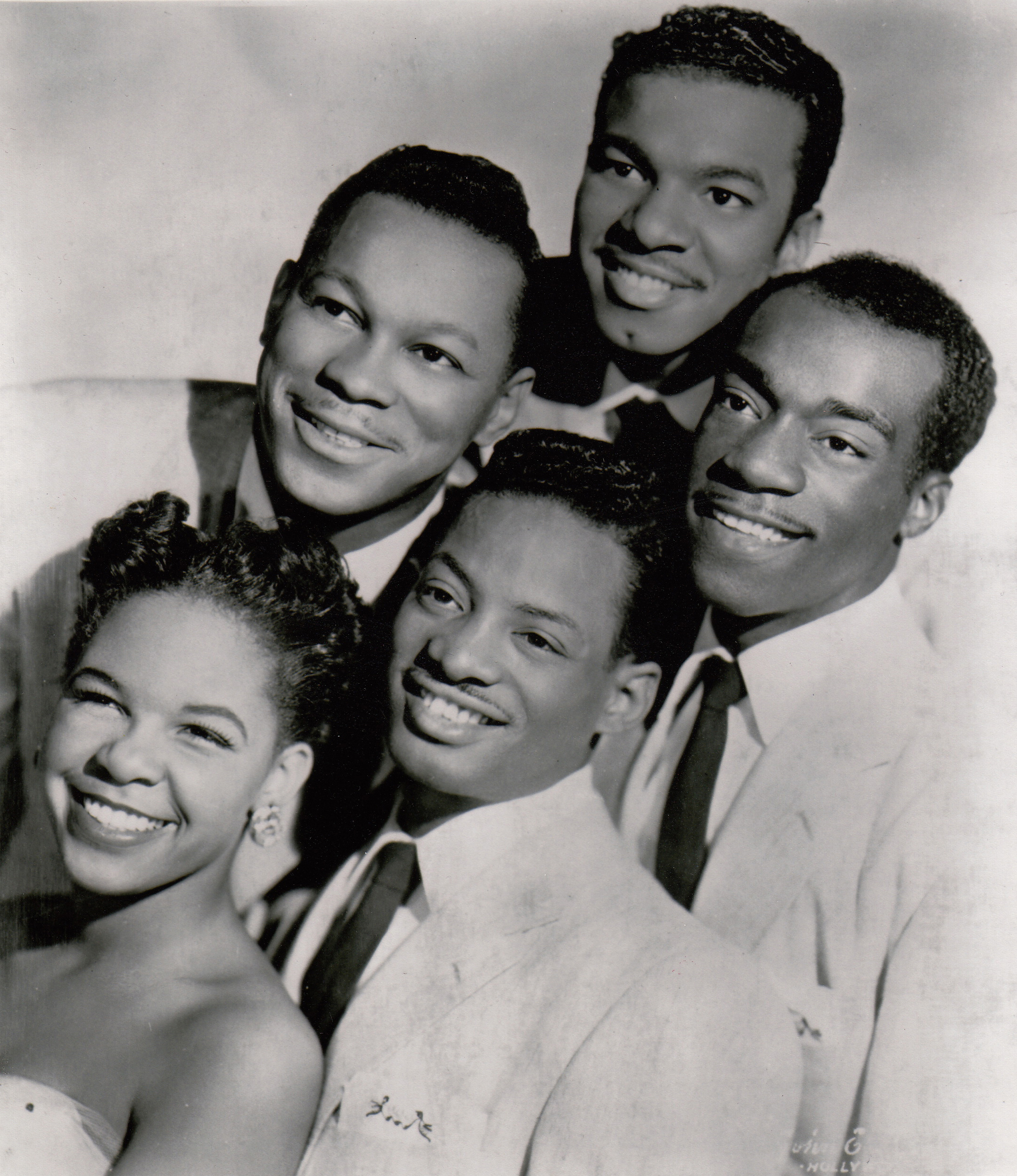
"Only You (And You Alone)" was a chart-topper for the Platters.

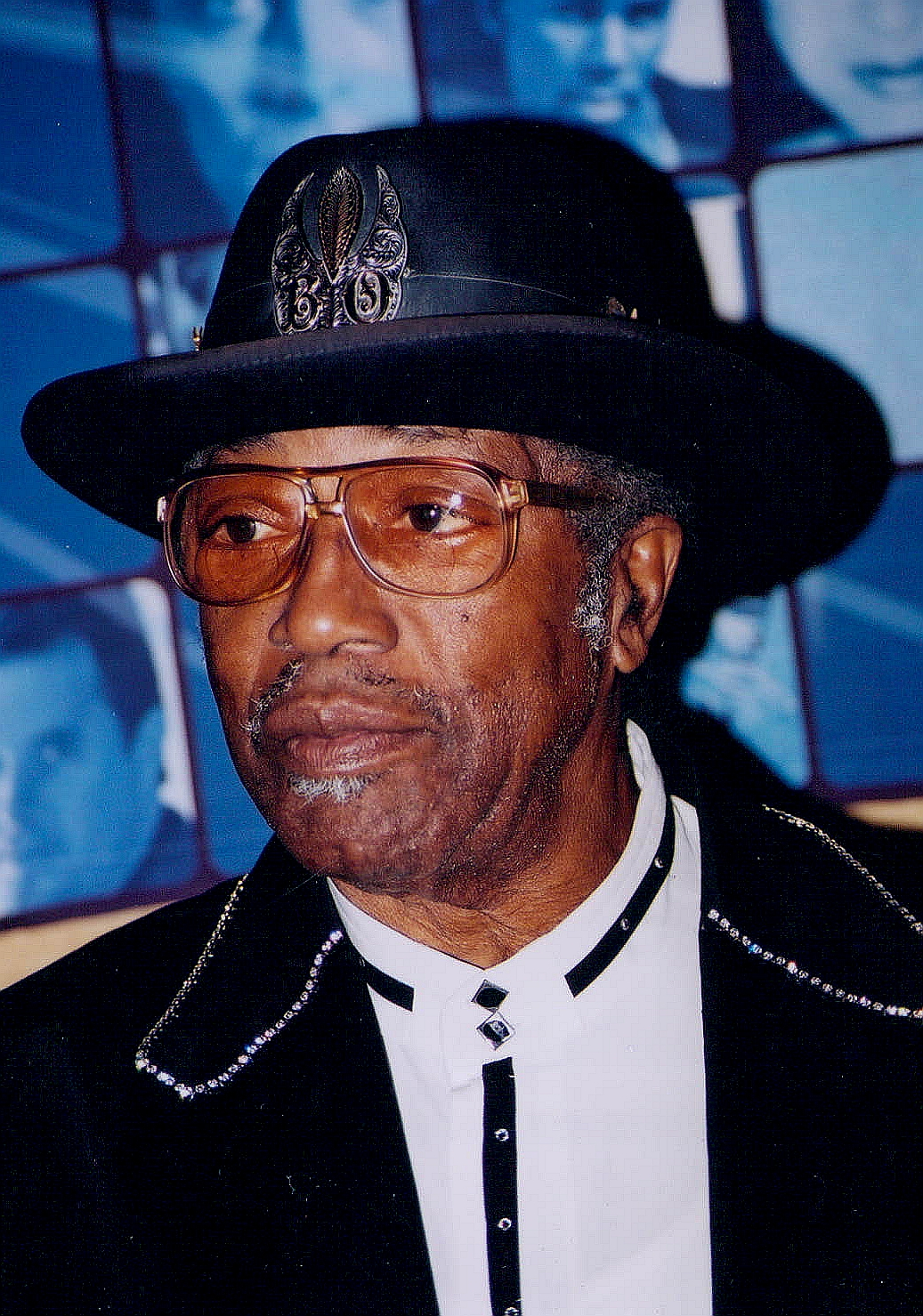
Bo Diddley (pictured in 2002) reached number one with his self-titled song.

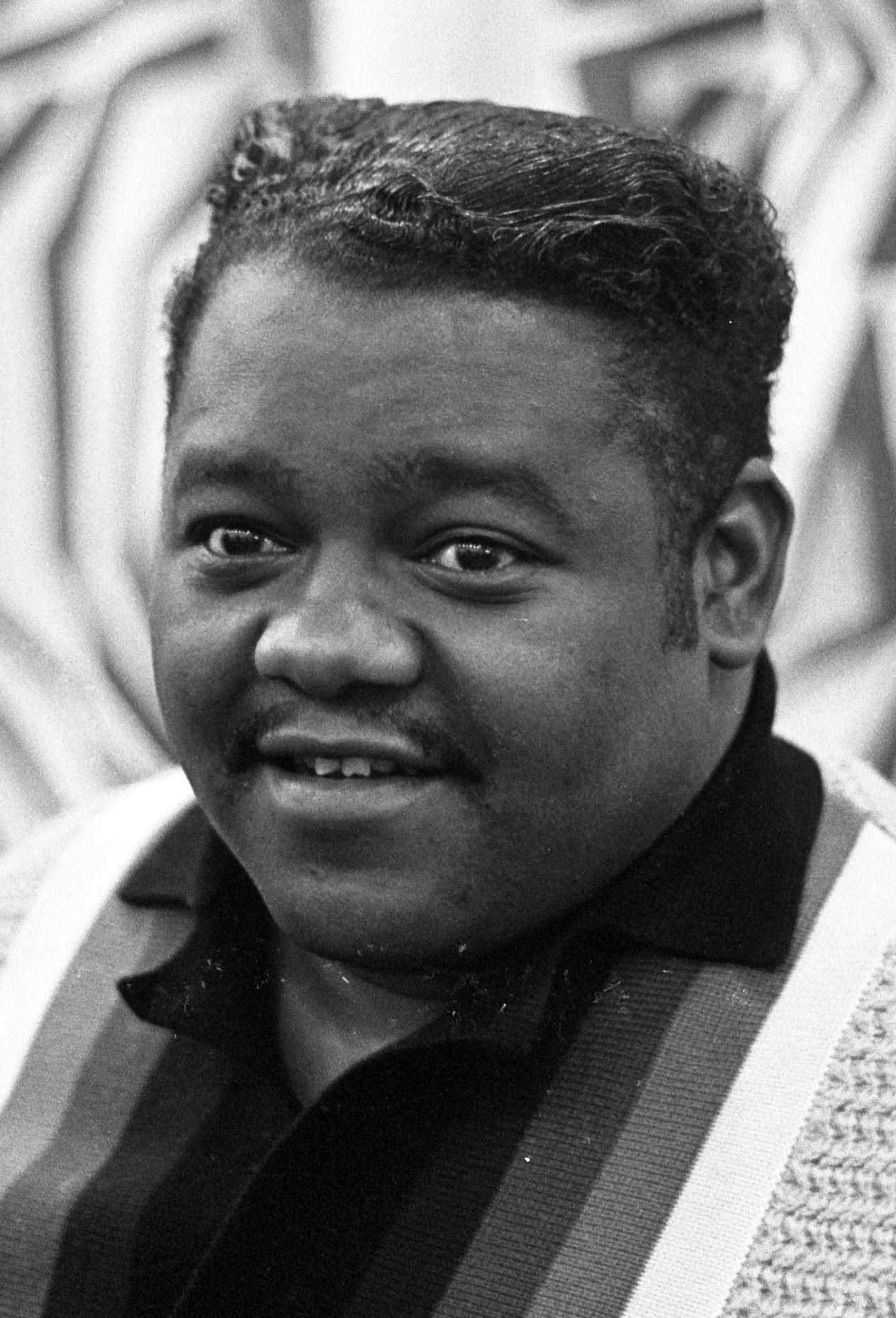
Fats Domino topped all three charts with "Ain't That a Shame".

Chart history
Issue date	Juke Box		Best Sellers		Jockeys		Ref.
Issue date	Title	Artist(s)	Title	Artist(s)	Title	Artist(s)	Ref.
January 1	"You Upset Me Baby"	B.B. King	"Hearts of Stone"	The Charms	—		
January 8	"Mambo Baby"	Ruth Brown	"Hearts of Stone"	The Charms	—		
January 15	"Earth Angel (Will You Be Mine)"	The Penguins	"Hearts of Stone"	The Charms	—		
January 22	"Sincerely"	The Moonglows	"Hearts of Stone"	The Charms	"Hearts of Stone"	The Charms	
January 29	"Hearts of Stone"	The Charms	"Earth Angel (Will You Be Mine)"	The Penguins	"Hearts of Stone"	The Charms	
February 5	"Hearts of Stone"	The Charms	"Earth Angel (Will You Be Mine)"	The Penguins	"Sincerely"	The Moonglows	
February 12	"Sincerely"	The Moonglows	"Earth Angel (Will You Be Mine)"	The Penguins	"Pledging My Love"	Johnny Ace	
February 19	"Earth Angel (Will You Be Mine)"	The Penguins	"Pledging My Love"	Johnny Ace	"Earth Angel (Will You Be Mine)"	The Penguins	
February 26	"Earth Angel (Will You Be Mine)"	The Penguins	"Pledging My Love"	Johnny Ace	"Pledging My Love"	Johnny Ace	
March 5	"Pledging My Love"	Johnny Ace	"Pledging My Love"	Johnny Ace	"Pledging My Love"	Johnny Ace	
March 12	"Pledging My Love"	Johnny Ace	"Pledging My Love"	Johnny Ace	"Pledging My Love"	Johnny Ace	
March 19	"Pledging My Love"	Johnny Ace	"Pledging My Love"	Johnny Ace	"Pledging My Love"	Johnny Ace	
March 26	"Pledging My Love"	Johnny Ace	"Pledging My Love"	Johnny Ace	"Pledging My Love"	Johnny Ace	
April 2	"Pledging My Love"	Johnny Ace	"Pledging My Love"	Johnny Ace	"Pledging My Love"	Johnny Ace	
April 9	"Pledging My Love"	Johnny Ace	"Pledging My Love"	Johnny Ace	"The Wallflower"	Etta James	
April 16	"Pledging My Love"	Johnny Ace	"Pledging My Love"	Johnny Ace	"Pledging My Love"	Johnny Ace	
April 23	"Pledging My Love"	Johnny Ace	"My Babe"	Little Walter	"Pledging My Love"	Johnny Ace	
April 30	"My Babe"	Little Walter	"My Babe"	Little Walter	"Pledging My Love"	Johnny Ace	
May 7	"I Got a Woman"	Ray Charles	"My Babe"	Little Walter	"The Wallflower"	Etta James	
May 14	"Pledging My Love"	Johnny Ace	"My Babe"	Little Walter	"My Babe"	Little Walter	
May 21	"My Babe"	Little Walter	"Unchained Melody"	Roy Hamilton	"The Wallflower"	Etta James	
May 28	"My Babe"	Little Walter	"Unchained Melody"	Roy Hamilton	"The Wallflower"	Etta James	
June 4	"My Babe"	Little Walter	"Unchained Melody"	Roy Hamilton	"My Babe"	Little Walter	
June 11	"My Babe"	Little Walter	"Ain't That a Shame"^{[a]}	Fats Domino	"Ain't That a Shame"^{[a]}	Fats Domino	
June 18	"Unchained Melody"	Al Hibbler	"Ain't That a Shame"^{[a]}	Fats Domino	"Ain't That a Shame"^{[a]}	Fats Domino	
June 25	"Bo Diddley"	Bo Diddley	"Ain't That a Shame"^{[a]}	Fats Domino	"Ain't That a Shame"^{[a]}	Fats Domino	
July 2	"Ain't That a Shame"^{[a]}	Fats Domino	"Ain't That a Shame"^{[a]}	Fats Domino	"Ain't That a Shame"^{[a]}	Fats Domino	
July 9	"Ain't That a Shame"^{[a]}	Fats Domino	"Ain't That a Shame"^{[a]}	Fats Domino	"Ain't That a Shame"^{[a]}	Fats Domino	
July 16	"Ain't That a Shame"^{[a]}	Fats Domino	"Ain't That a Shame"^{[a]}	Fats Domino	"Ain't That a Shame"^{[a]}	Fats Domino	
July 23	"Ain't That a Shame"^{[a]}	Fats Domino	"Ain't That a Shame"^{[a]}	Fats Domino	"Ain't That a Shame"^{[a]}	Fats Domino	
July 30	"Ain't That a Shame"^{[a]}	Fats Domino	"Ain't That a Shame"^{[a]}	Fats Domino	"Ain't That a Shame"^{[a]}	Fats Domino	
August 6	"Bo Diddley"	Bo Diddley	"Ain't That a Shame"^{[a]}	Fats Domino	"A Fool for You"	Ray Charles	
August 13	"Ain't That a Shame"^{[a]}	Fats Domino	"Ain't That a Shame"^{[a]}	Fats Domino	"Ain't That a Shame"^{[a]}	Fats Domino	
August 20	"Ain't That a Shame"^{[a]}	Fats Domino	"Ain't That a Shame"^{[a]}	Fats Domino	"Maybellene"	Chuck Berry	
August 27	"Ain't That a Shame"^{[a]}	Fats Domino	"Maybellene"	Chuck Berry	"Maybellene"	Chuck Berry	
September 3	"Maybellene"	Chuck Berry	"Maybellene"	Chuck Berry	"Maybellene"	Chuck Berry	
September 10	"Maybellene"	Chuck Berry	"Maybellene"	Chuck Berry	"Maybellene"	Chuck Berry	
September 17	"Maybellene"	Chuck Berry	"Maybellene"	Chuck Berry	"Maybellene"	Chuck Berry	
September 24	"Maybellene"	Chuck Berry	"Maybellene"	Chuck Berry	"Maybellene"	Chuck Berry	
October 1	"Maybellene"	Chuck Berry	"Maybellene"	Chuck Berry	"Maybellene"	Chuck Berry	
October 8	"Maybellene"	Chuck Berry	"Maybellene"	Chuck Berry	"Maybellene"	Chuck Berry	
October 15	"Maybellene"	Chuck Berry	"Maybellene"	Chuck Berry	"Maybellene"	Chuck Berry	
October 22	"Maybellene"	Chuck Berry	"Maybellene"	Chuck Berry	"Only You (And You Alone)"	The Platters	
October 29	"Maybellene"	Chuck Berry	"Only You (And You Alone)"	The Platters	"All by Myself"	Fats Domino	
November 5	"Maybellene"	Chuck Berry	"Only You (And You Alone)"	The Platters	"All by Myself"	Fats Domino	
November 12	"Maybellene"	Chuck Berry	"Only You (And You Alone)"	The Platters	"All by Myself"	Fats Domino	
November 19	"Only You (And You Alone)"	The Platters	"Only You (And You Alone)"	The Platters	"Only You (And You Alone)"	The Platters	
November 26	"Only You (And You Alone)"	The Platters	"Only You (And You Alone)"	The Platters	"Only You (And You Alone)"	The Platters	
December 3	"Only You (And You Alone)"	The Platters	"Only You (And You Alone)"	The Platters	"Only You (And You Alone)"	The Platters	
December 10	"Only You (And You Alone)"	The Platters	"Only You (And You Alone)"	The Platters	"Only You (And You Alone)"	The Platters	
December 17	"Only You (And You Alone)"	The Platters	"Hands Off"	Priscilla Bowman with Jay McShann and his Orchestra	"Hands Off"	Priscilla Bowman with Jay McShann and his Orchestra	
December 24	"Only You (And You Alone)"	The Platters	"Hands Off"	Priscilla Bowman with Jay McShann and his Orchestra	"Hands Off"	Priscilla Bowman with Jay McShann and his Orchestra	
December 31	"Adorable" / "Steamboat"^{[b]}	The Drifters	"Hands Off"	Priscilla Bowman with Jay McShann and his Orchestra	"Poor Me"	Fats Domino	

== Notes ==
a. Listed on the chart as "Ain't It a Shame"
b. Both sides listed jointly at number one
