= Edward Wiley Ray =

American songwriter and record producer (1926–2026)

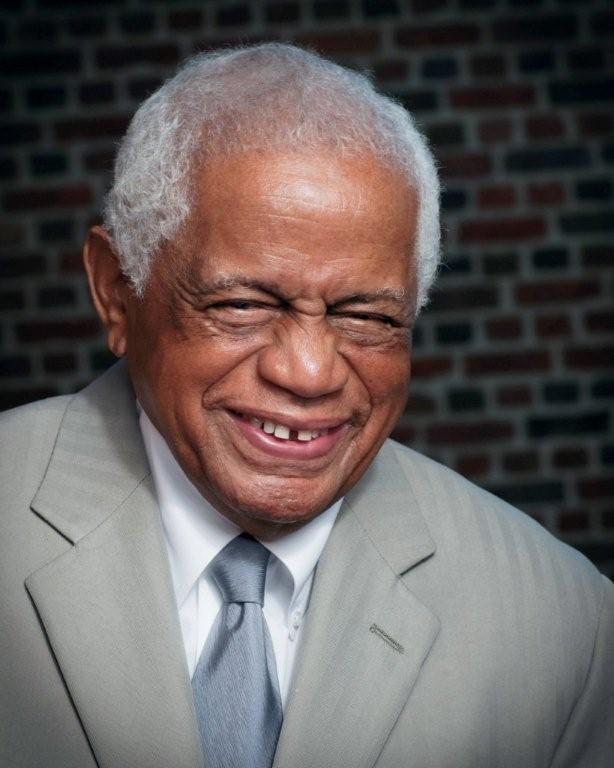
Ray in 2011

Edward Wiley Ray (December 21, 1926 – June 21, 2026), better known as Eddie Ray, was an American songwriter, record producer and company executive, author and consultant who was Operation Director and Vice Chairman of the North Carolina Music Hall of Fame Museum. He was also an inductee in the North Carolina Music Hall of Fame. He was also a United States Presidential Appointee under Ronald Reagan serving as Commissioner and Chairman of the Copyright Royalty Tribunal.

== Early years ==
Ray was born on December 21, 1926 in Franklin, North Carolina, where he was also raised. He was the third youngest of eight children born to his father, Andrew Ray, owner of a janitorial service and his mother, Grace Ray, who was a homemaker.

He had to leave Franklin to attend high school at Laurinburg Institute in Laurinburg, North Carolina, because Franklin was segregated and did not have a high school for African American children.

After graduating from high school in 1944, Ray was accepted into an Army Reserve Specialized Training Program at Howard University in Washington, D.C. Upon becoming 18 years of age he was inducted into the regular Army and then applied for Army Officer Candidate School. However, he was unable to pass the vision test because of formations of cataracts on both his eyes. After only a few months in the regular Army, Ray was discharged from the Army and in early 1945 moved to Milwaukee, where he got his first job in the music industry as a stock boy at Decca Records Distributing Company.

== Early music career ==
In November 1945, Ray moved to Los Angeles and in early 1946 began working for Aladdin Records, a major, independent record company, as an assistant shipping clerk. Aladdin was owned by two brothers, Leo and Eddie Mesner both of whom became Ray's mentors in the music industry. Some of the major recording artists on Aladdin at that time included, Johnny Moore, The Three Blazers featuring Charles Brown, Amos Milburn, The Five Keys, Lester Young and Illinois Jacquet.

Ray was given opportunities to meet these artists and to attend their concerts and recordings session and began to learn in detail about the commercial music and recording business. During Ray's three years employment at Aladdin Records, he also earned an Associate Arts degree in Business Administration from Los Angeles City College.

After leaving Aladdin Records in early 1950, Ray joined Central Record Sales Company, a major independent wholesale record distributor in Los Angeles, California. Central Record Sales was the exclusive distributor for a majority of the major, national independent record companies for the Southern California area. Initially Ray was responsible for Central's “in house sales” to Southern California's smaller retail stores and juke box operators. He eventually became chief record “buyer” and radio promotion man for Central Record Sales.

While at Central Record Sales, Ray promoted and sold records for numerous rhythm and blues artists including Ruth Brown, The Drifters, B. B. King, Sam Cooke, Ray Charles, Joe Turner, Clyde McPhatter, Howlin' Wolf, Jesse Belvin, The Clovers, and other R&B recording stars of that era.

In 1954, while still at Central Record Sales, Ray and a musician/songwriter Rudy Jackson began writing songs together. Their biggest hit, was a song entitled “Hearts of Stone”, performed by a local Los Angeles singing group, The Jewels.

Ray, Al Schlesinger and Larry Goldberg formed a record label, "R & B Records", and released “Hearts of Stone” in the Southern California area only and sold over 50,000 copies. The song later became a top national charted, Pop, R&B and Country hit by the Fontaine Sisters, The Charms and Red Foley. Years later it became a national top charted record by the Bill Black Combo and John Fogerty and The Blue Ridge Rangers. “Hearts of Stone” has been recorded by over 32 major recording artists, including Elvis Presley and is in the soundtracks of several movies including Goodfellas. "Hearts of Stone" is listed as one of Broadcast Music, Inc.'s Award Winning Songs.

== 1950s–1960s ==
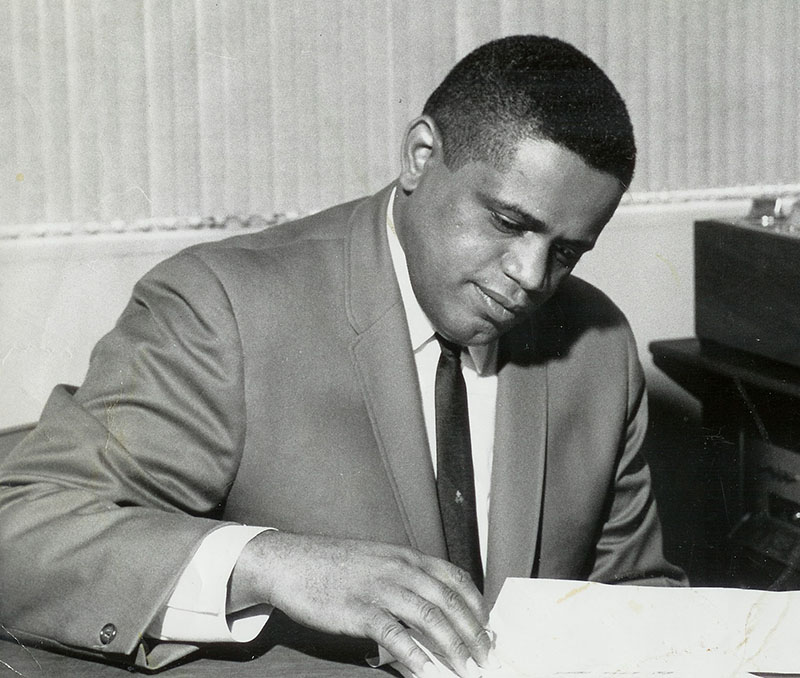
Ray at Capitol Records

In February, 1955, Ray joined Imperial Records in Hollywood, California, a major, independent record company, as National Director of Promotion and Sales. During the nine years that Ray was with Imperial Records he was responsible for all the national promotion and sales for all Imperial/Minit recording artists, including, recording artists Fats Domino, Ricky Nelson, Slim Whitman, Sandy Nelson, Johnny Rivers, Ernie Freeman, Irma Thomas, Aaron Neville, Ernie K-Doe, Smiley Lewis, Billy J. Kramer and many others.

In addition to Ray's responsibilities as director of national promotion and sales for Imperial, he also produced national chart hit single records by Sandy Nelson ( "Let There Be Drums"), Ernie Freeman ("Raunchy"), Irma Thomas ("Wish Someone Would Care" / "Time Is On My Side" / "Break Away") and several national charted albums by Sandy Nelson and Ernie Freeman.

In 1964, Ray joined Capitol Records, in Hollywood, California as Artists and Repertoire (A&R) Director of Tower Records, Capitol Records’ newly created, wholly owned subsidiary. Subsequently, Ray became Vice President of A&R for Capitol/Tower Records becoming the first African American executive of a major U.S. record company.

During Ray's five years as A&R chief for Capitol/Tower Records he acquired scores of successful selling EMI English and U.S. independently produced artists such as Freddie & The Dreamers, The Standells, Ian Whitcomb, The Arrows, the Sunrays, Harry Nilsson are some of the artists that had singles and/or albums that attained national chart positions during Ray's tenure there.

In addition, two of Ray's most important acquisitions for Capitol/Tower Records were American International Pictures (AIP) successful movie sound track albums, including The Wild Angels and several others, produced by independent producer, Mike Curb, and the acquisition of the EMI rock group Pink Floyd.

== Coburt Television Production/MGM Records ==
In July 1969 Ray joined Coburt Television Production in Beverly Hills, California as executive vice president of COBURT's newly created Record Music Division. COBURT was an independent television production company owned by Pierre Cossette, a successful Hollywood entertainment agent and subsequently an exclusive television producer of the Grammy Awards telecast for thirty four years and Burt Sugarman, a successful Beverly Hills business and investment financier, who subsequently produced Midnight Special TV musical series.

Some of Ray's most important accomplishments while with Coburt were his establishment of BMI & ASCAP music publishing firms for the Coburt Music Division; the successful negotiation of a Coburt/MGM Records label distribution agreement; and his production of a Chevrolet merchandising album featuring Glen Campbell, Dionne Warwick and Burt Bacharach that sold over a million units.

In 1970, Ray left CoBurt Television Production and joined MGM Records in Hollywood, California as Senior Vice President of A&R Administration. As head of A&R Administration at MGM, Ray was responsible for the administration of MGM's Recording studios in Hollywood, California and Nashville, Tennessee; MGM's Copyright Clearance & Licensing Departments; MGM Artist's recording contract fulfillment requirements; Musician Union negotiations; recording session schedules & musician payments; record release pre-preparation; and the preparations of multimillion-dollar recording budgets.

Some of the artists with whom Ray worked while at MGM were the Osmonds, Donnie & Marie, Lou Rawls, Sammy Davis, Jr., Hank Williams, Jr., Richie Havens, and The Sylvers.

MGM was sold to Polygram in 1973 but Ray was unwilling to move to the new MGM/Polydor/Polygram headquarters in New York City and negotiated his resignation from his MGM employment agreement.

== Mid–late 1970s ==
In early 1974, Ray moved to Memphis, Tennessee, and became executive vice president and part owner of Sounds of Memphis Recording Studio and Record Production Company (SOM). Before Ray joined the company SOM had produced a couple of national hit records, one of which was the iconic record “Wooly Bully” by Sam the Sham & Pharaohs that was distributed by MGM Records.

While at SOM, Ray terminated and negotiated new foreign music publishing and performance rights agreements for SOM's music publishing companies; terminated and negotiated new SOM artists distribution agreements; and expanded SOM's Recording Studio's custom service business. Some of the artists represented by Ray while at SOM were Solomon Burke, Jazz organist Jimmy Smith, the Ovations, Barbara and the Browns, hit songwriter/artist George Jackson and others.

Also, while still at SOM, Ray established his own company, Eddie Ray Music Enterprises, that among its other activities, established a vocational commercial music school named, The Tennessee College of Recording Arts and Sciences. Ray operated the school for two years and then assisted in incorporating the school's commercial music program curricula into a degree program offered by Memphis State University's (presently known as the University of Memphis) College of Fine Arts & Communications.

In 1976, Ray joined Cream/Hi Records as executive vice president and general manager. Ray was also responsible for the management of Cream/HI Records’ music publishing company, East Memphis Music, a former Stax Record music publishing company. Hi Records was a successful R&B Independent record label. Some of HI Records artists were Hall of Fame and Grammy award artist & songwriter Al Green, Ann Peebles, Ace Cannon, and the Bill Black Combo.

Cream/Hi Records was well known for the numerous valuable music copyrights they owned which included songs such as “In The Midnight Hour”, “Knock On Wood”, “Green Onions”, “Hold On I'm Coming”, “Respect”, “Soul Man”, “Lets Stay Together” and many others.

== Appointment to US Copyright Tribunal ==
In October, 1981, Ray was appointed by President Ronald Reagan, and confirmed by the US senate, to serve as a US Commissioner on the US Copyright Royalty Tribunal (CRT), for the unexpired term of a commissioner who resigned. Then in September 1982, President Reagan nominated Ray for the second for a full term of seven years as a Commissioner on the CRT.

The CRT's primary responsibilities was (1) to set the Statutory Rates for certain sections of the Compulsory Licensing provisions of the US Copyright Act; and (2) to conduct Distribution Hearings to distribute Statutory Royalty funds that were deposited directly to the US Copyright Office by copyright users to be distributed to the appropriate copyright owners.

During Ray's tenure, the CRT conducted one Statutory Rate Hearing and raised the original rate set by Congress for Cable/Satellite companies that retransmitted broadcast signals into a distant market. The definition of “distant market” was thirty miles from the location where the broadcast signal originated. The CRT's Cable/Satellite rate final Determination cause a tremendous controversy among Cable/Satellite companies and several members of Congress who believed the rate was much too high. The Cable/ Satellite companies appealed the CRT's Determination to the Second Federal Circuit Court in Washington, DC and the Court upheld the CRT's Determination in full.

The CRT also conducted a Distribution Hearing each year while Ray served as Commissioner at the CRT. During each of the Distribution Hearings, copyright owners were represented by copyright Claimants MPAA(for movies & TV Situation Comedies); Joints Sports (for NBA, Major League Baseball & NCAA ); Devotionals (TV Religious Programs); Music Performance Societies ( BMI, ASCAP, SESAC ); PBS; and NPR.

The CRT annually distributed approximately $200,000,000 in royalties. In each of the Distribution Hearing's the CRT's final Determination were challenged by one or more of the copyright Claimants and appealed to the Second Federal Circuit Court in Washington, D.C. In each Distribution Hearing appeal, the Circuit Court upheld the CRT's determination.

=== Tribunal controversy ===
President Reagan appointed Marianne Mele Hall to be Commissioner at the CRT. Commissioner Hall attempted to get Congress to change the law to permit only attorneys to serve as commissioners on the CRT which would have directly affected Commissioner Ray and Commissioner Mario Aguero, a Cuban-American on the CRT. Ray and Aguero were the only minority members and the only non-attorneys on the CRT at the time. During Hall's campaign to have Congress change the law, she noted that she had co-authored a book entitled, “Foundations of Sand”. Later a reporter who had interviewed her secured the book and read it. The book contained disparaging remarks about African Americans, suggesting they were inferior to Caucasians quoting, “They insist on preserving their jungle freedoms, their women, their avoidance of personal responsibility, and their abhorrence of the work ethic”.

Several national articles about the controversy appeared in newspapers across the country including the Washington Post, New York Times, and LA Times. The controversy also raised additional scrutiny regarding Presidential appointees and their vetting process in Congress and the public.

Hall later tried to claim she only edited “Foundations of Sand” and was not a co-author. Despite her efforts to distance herself from the book, Hall's association to the book damaged her character and caused national embarrassment for the Reagan Administration which forced her to resign from the CRT.

Commissioner Ray became Acting Chairman of the CRT after Commissioner Hall's resignation and appeared before Congress to respond to the issues that had been raised during the controversy. In addition, he oversaw changes to the CRT like the reduction of commissions from 7 to 5 which were voted on by Congress in response to the issues raised during the Hall controversy.

On September 29, 1989, Commissioner Ray's term at the CRT expired and he did not seek another term.

== North Carolina Music Hall of Fame ==
From October 1989 through 2009 Ray was an independent commercial music consultant for various national record/music clients. During this period he also wrote and self-published books of poetry entitled Natural Expression, Straight From The Heart, Reflections On The Joys & Sorrows of The Heart, Thorns And Roses, and Up From The Mountains.

In January 2009, Ray became vice chairman of the North Carolina Music Hall of Fame (NCMHOF) and operation director of its Hall of Fame Museum in Kannapolis, North Carolina. The NCMHOF is a non-profit organization and museum that was created to honor musicians, composers and artists with ties to North Carolina that have made significant impact in the music industry. Ray was instrumental in reopening the museum and moving it from its original home in Thomasville, North Carolina, to its present location in Kannapolis.

In October 2009, Ray was inducted into the North Carolina Music Hall of Fame as a non-performing artist, originally from the State of North Carolina.

== Death ==
Ray died on June 21, 2026, at the age of 99.
