= Priscilla Bowman =

American singer (1928–1988)

- Born: Priscilla Mills; May 30, 1928; Kansas City, Kansas, U.S.
- Died: July 24, 1988 (aged 60) Kansas City, Kansas
- Genres: R&B
- Occupation: Singer
- Years active: c.1950 – c.1975
- Formerly of: Jay McShann

Priscilla Bowman (born Priscilla I. Mills, May 30, 1928 – July 24, 1988) was an American jazz and rhythm and blues singer, who had a No. 1 hit single on the Billboard magazine R&B chart in 1955 with the song "Hands Off". She was the lead singer for the Jay McShann band.

== Biography ==
The daughter of Ethel and Solomon Mills, she was born in Kansas City, Kansas, and has been called the city's "original rock 'n' roll mama." Her influences included singers Ruth Brown and Annie Laurie. She joined the Jay McShann band in the early 1950s. In 1955 the band signed with Vee-Jay Records, and Bowman recorded two sessions with them. One of the songs, "Hands Off", became a hit and stayed at No. 1 on the R&B chart for three weeks in December 1955.

She recorded three sessions for Vee-Jay and its subsidiary label, Falcon, as a solo singer between 1957 and 1959 but could not repeat her success. However, in 1958 she was the first to record the song "A Rockin' Good Way (to Mess Around and Fall in Love)", with uncredited vocal backing by The Spaniels. The song was written with Brook Benton and became a hit when Benton recorded it himself as a duo with Dinah Washington in 1960.

Bowman recorded again for Abner Records in 1959 and continued to record and make personal appearances, some with McShann, through the mid-1970s. She retired to family life. A compilation album of her recordings, An Original Rock & Roll Mama, was released in 1986.

Bowman died in July 1988 from lung cancer at the age of 60.
