= James Bracken =

American songwriter (1909–1972)

James C. Bracken (May 23, 1909 – February 20, 1972) was an American songwriter and the co-founder and co-owner of Vee-Jay Records with his wife Vivian and her brother, Calvin Carter.

== Life ==
Bracken was born in Oklahoma and grew up in Kansas City. He was living in Chicago when he met Vivian Carter in 1944. In 1950 they founded Vivian's Record Shop in Gary, Indiana, and three years later decided to start their own record company, which they named Vee-Jay from their initials. As well as producing and releasing records through his label, Bracken also wrote some of the songs recorded. During the 1950s and early 1960s Vee-Jay became a major independent record label with acts including Jimmy Reed, John Lee Hooker, Gene Chandler, Jerry Butler, The Four Seasons and, for a time, The Beatles. The company folded in 1966.

Bracken died in Los Angeles in 1972.

== Songwriting credits ==
Bracken is sometimes credited with songs recorded by Vee-Jay artists, such as John Lee Hooker ("Baby Lee", "Dimples", "Little Wheel", "Kiss The Girls"), Jimmy Reed ("High and Lonesome"), Memphis Slim ("Steppin' Out," which ultimately became a showcase for Eric Clapton with John Mayall's group and, especially, with Cream), The Spaniels ("Baby It's You", "Sloppy Drunk"). He is often erroneously credited as the songwriter on releases of the 1969 Buddah Records live recording by Bill Haley and His Comets of "Rock the Joint", which was written by Harold Crafton, Wendell Keane, and Harold Bagby.
