= Withrow Minstrels =

High school musical variety show in Ohio, US

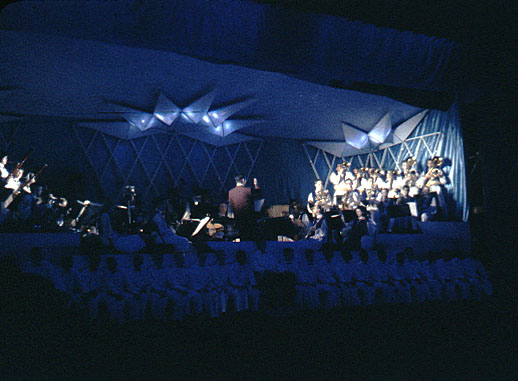
The 1960 Withrow Presentation Orchestra

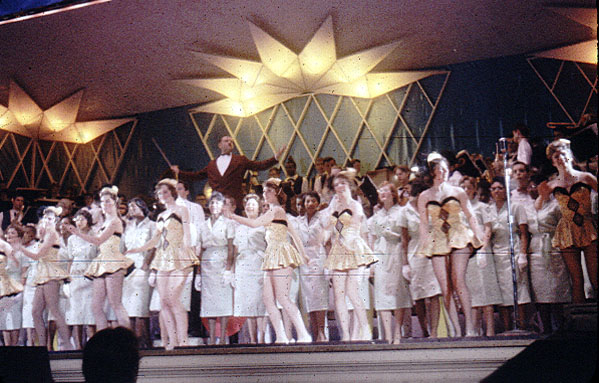
Opening Ponies, 1960

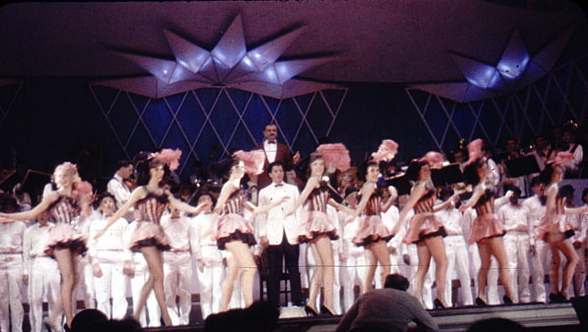
Take Me Along, 1960

The Withrow Minstrels was a musical variety show that ran for 35 years at Withrow High School in Cincinnati, Ohio. It was known as "The Minstrels". Two hundred performances were staged between 1931 and 1965.

== History ==
The Minstrels was created in 1931 by the school's 22-year-old band director, George G. "Smittie" Smith and performed under "Smittie's" direction every year. The Minstrels is one of the nation's first high school performing arts programs. At the first performance in May 1931, the crowd was thrilled by the polish and professionalism of the cast of 12- to 17-year-old kids (until 1970 the six Cincinnati public high schools comprised grades seven to twelve). The curtain closed on the last performance on Saturday, May 8, 1965, when Smittie retired from teaching (Enquirer, 6/26/1982). It ran for six nights, drawing sell-out crowds in excess of 2000 people per performance (Enquirer, 5/12/60). In 1956 the Cincinnati Board of Education ordered the school to cut performances to five nights, citing concern that the show took much of the students' time.

== Withrow Presentation Orchestra and Staging ==
The centerpiece of The Minstrels was the Withrow Presentation Orchestra, a 60 piece, Paul Whiteman style (American Musicians II, pp 497–8) big band consisting of brass, woodwinds, strings, and percussion (drums, tympani, chimes, vibraphone). The orchestra performed renditions of Tin Pan Alley and other music to accompany students' vocal and dance performances. Staging featured sophisticated lighting and special effects. (Cincinnati Post, 7/17/85). Sets and lighting were constructed by students (Cincinnati Post, 7/17/85). Student performances included solos, production numbers with solo singers, solo dancers, ensemble singing, special effects, and a Rockettes style "pony chorus". Each show ran almost three hours without intermission.

No stock sheet music was used in The Minstrels (Cincinnati Enquirer, 5/12/60). Smittie arranged the music and Ansel C. Martin, the school's choir director, arranged the vocal scores.

Russell Dale Flick, writing in The Cincinnati Post, observed that "Smittie's Minstrels gave many of his student performers their one-and-only exposure to the bright lights, costumes, make-up, and rapturous applause of the musical stage".

In his book American Musicians II: Seventy-One Portraits in Jazz, jazz critic Whitney Balliett quotes bassist Michael Moore, who performed in the Withrow Presentation Orchestra while a student at Withrow High School. "I became part of the Withrow Minstrels, a high-caliber musical organization...run by George Smith...his shows were practically Paul Whiteman Productions."

Sheet music from The Withrow Minstrels of 1934 is in the Library of Congress.

Minstreleers who went on to careers in entertainment include Carole Black, CEO and President of Lifetime Entertainment; R&B singer Otis Williams of Otis Williams and the Charms; jazz bassist Michael Moore; Bruce Rhoten, Principal Trumpet of the NDR Radiophilharmonie; Richard Johnson, Principal Oboe Emeritus of the Cincinnati Symphony Orchestra, and United States Air Force director of entertainment, Tommy Edwards.
