= Vivian Carter =

American businesswoman (1921–1989)

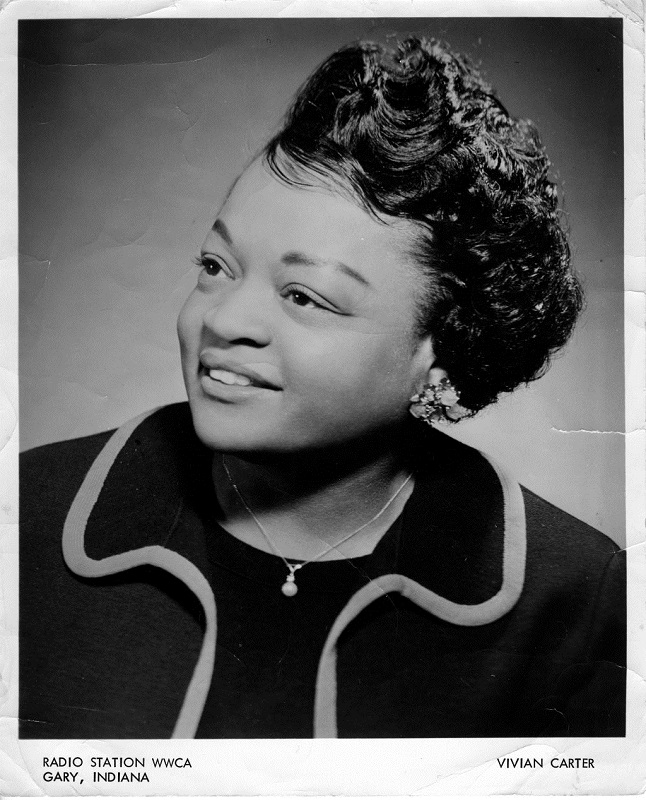
- Born: March 25, 1921; Tunica, Mississippi, U.S.
- Died: June 12, 1989 (aged 68)
- Education: Roosevelt High School
- Known for: Radio DJ
- Spouse: James Bracken (m. 1953; died 1972)
- Relatives: Calvin Carter (brother)

Vivian Carter (March 25, 1921 – June 12, 1989) was an American record company executive who was a founder of Vee-Jay Records with her future husband, Jimmy Bracken. Carter was also a Gary, Indiana, and Chicago, Illinois, radio disc jockey. Vee Jay, an independent record label, became the first successful black-owned recording company in the United States. It released original music from artists of the 1950s and 1960s in a variety of genres, including rhythm and blues, doo-wop, pop, and gospel.

== Early life and education ==
Carter was born in Tunica, Mississippi, United States, and moved with her parents to Gary, Indiana, when she was a child. She graduated from Gary's Roosevelt High School in 1939. Carter excelled at public speaking, theater, and chorus. A classmate and longtime friend described her as a fun-loving extrovert with "a rich alto voice."

After graduation, Carter took classes at a business college before becoming a clerical worker for the U.S. Army's Quartermaster Corps during World War II. After a year in Washington, D.C., she transferred to Chicago to be closer to family and friends.

== Marriage and family ==
In 1944, Carter met Jimmy Bracken, who became her business partner. They were married on December 16, 1953. Bracken died in 1972.

== Career ==
=== Radio personality ===
In 1948, Carter won a talent contest conducted by Al Benson, a disc jockey (dee jay) at Chicago's WGES radio station. The prize was an opportunity to host a fifteen-minute segment on WGES, which launched her radio career. Carter worked at WGES for three months, but struggled financially and returned to Gary to work in a local millinery shop until she landed a job at WJOB (AM) in Hammond, Indiana. In 1952 Carter moved to WGRY and in 1954 to WWCA in Gary, where she hosted the "Livin' with Vivian" show six nights a week. Carter aired a mix of musical genres, including blues, gospel, jazz, and what became known as doo-wop.

=== Record store owner ===
In 1950, Carter and Bracken opened Vivian's Record Shop at 1640 Broadway in Gary's Midtown district.

=== Cofounder of Vee-Jay Records ===
In 1953, Carter and Bracken borrowed $500 to establish a new record company, Vee-Jay Records, taking its name from the initials of their first names. The Spaniels recording of "Baby It's You" and "Bounce" (B side) became Vee Jay's first release for the group. However, with no capacity to distribute the record, Vee Jay leased the recording to Chance Records. "Baby It's You" eventually reached number ten on Billboard magazine's rhythm-and-blues chart. In 1954, when Chance went out of business, Ewart Abner, Chance's accountant, moved to Vee Jay and assumed most of its management responsibilities. Calvin Carter, Vivian's brother, later joined Vee Jay as it A&R (artists and repertoire) man to discover, produce, and develop new talent for the label.

During the 1950s and early 1960s, under Carter's and Bracken's ownership, Vee-Jay became a major independent record label with acts including The Spaniels, Jimmy Reed, the El Dorados, John Lee Hooker, Gene Chandler, Jerry Butler, Dee Clark, The Staple Singers, and The Four Seasons, among others. Because of their success with The Four Seasons, Vee Jay was approached by Transglobal Music Co., Inc. to carry Frank Ifield's single, "I Remember You". As part of the package, Vee Jay obtained the rights to the Beatles' "Please Please Me" and "Ask Me Why" which were released in 1963 (catalog number VJ 498). Vee Jay secured the American distribution rights to The Beatles in 1963, and even sold a million copies of "Introducing the Beatles", but contract loopholes and lawsuits caused the company to lose them to Capitol Records. Meanwhile, Carter continued to work as a radio dee jay, a key factor in attracting musical talent to the label.

Vee Jay Records, among the most successful independent labels of its era, made Carter a wealthy businesswoman. However, by the mid-1960s the record company was experiencing financial and legal difficulties arising from significant debts and spending beyond its means. Carter, who later admitted that she had delegated too much of the company's day-to-day management, was unable to save the company, even after attempts to establish a new management team and closing its offices in California to reduce expenses. By 1964 the company was bankrupt; it ceased record production in 1966.

== Later years ==
In 1967, Carter lost a bid for election to become Gary's city clerk and later worked in the township trustee's office. She also continued to remain active in radio as a late-night dee jay on WWCA in Gary.

== Death and legacy ==
By the mid-1980s, Carter's health began to fail from high blood pressure, diabetes, and strokes. Partially paralyzed, she died in a nursing home in 1989.

During Carter's career as a radio disc jockey, she helped introduce and promote the music of many notable American recording artists of the 1950s and 1960s. Although she was described by one biographer as "negligent financially toward performers" her recording company developed, she was also a pioneer in helping to promote and capture their musical sounds on vinyl records.

In 2026, Carter was inducted into the Radio Hall of Fame in the "Legends" category.
