= Two Hearts (The Charms song) =

1954 song

Single by The Charms
- A-side: "The First Time We Met"
- Released: November 1954
- Genre: doo-wop
- Length: 2:36
- Label: De Luxe
- Songwriters: Otis Williams, Henry Stone

"Two Hearts", or "Two Hearts, Two Kisses (Make One Love)" is a popular song, written by Otis Williams and Henry Stone in 1954. It was originally recorded by Otis Williams and the Charms, it first reached the Billboard R&B chart on March 23, 1955, and lasted 12 weeks on the chart, peaking at number 8.

== Background ==
The song has an unusual 44-bar form, alternating 12-bar blues sections with an 8-bar bridge.

== Cover versions ==
In 1955, it was recorded by Pat Boone for a major hit peaking at number 16 on the pop charts. This recording was released by Dot Records as catalog number 15338.
