= North Carolina Music Hall of Fame =

Museum in Kannapolis, North Carolina

- Established: 1994
- Location: Kannapolis, North Carolina
- Coordinates: 35°29′50″N 80°37′31″W
- Type: Music
- Director: Eddie Ray
- Website: www.northcarolinamusichalloffame.org

The North Carolina Music Hall of Fame is a non-profit organization and museum in Kannapolis, North Carolina, which was created to honor musicians, composers and artists with ties to North Carolina that have made significant impact in the music industry. The museum serves as a clearinghouse for North Carolina musicians from all time periods, and preserves a number of memorabilia artifacts for public display.

In December 2014, the North Carolina Music Hall of Fame relocated to a new home within the Curb Museum for Music and Motorsports at 600 Dale Earnhardt Boulevard.

== History ==
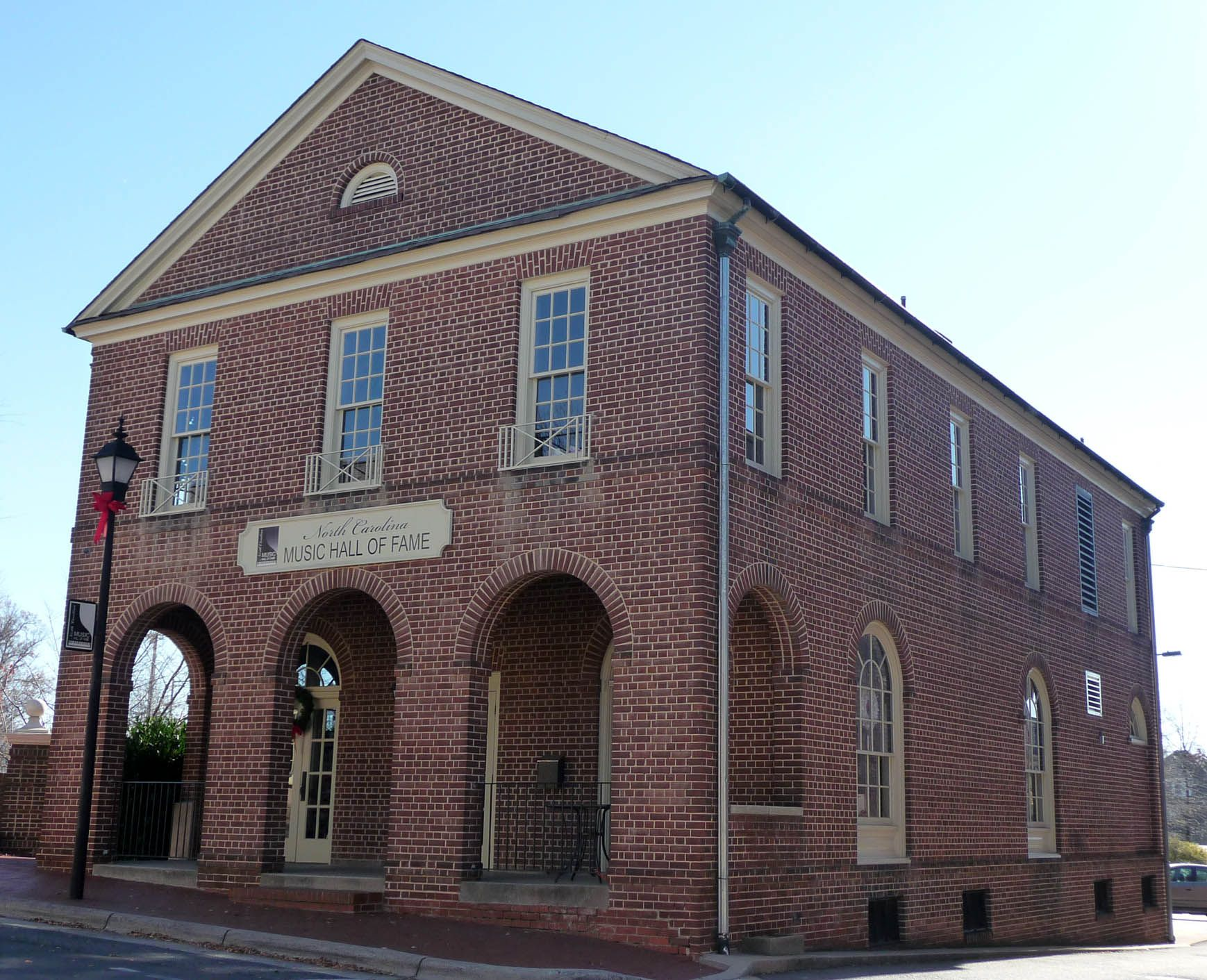
Building housing the North Carolina Music Hall of Fame located in Kannapolis, North Carolina. It previously was the old jail for the town.

The organization was founded in 1994 by businessmen Doug Croft and Joe Carroll. Originally located in Thomasville, North Carolina, the group inducted seven people in 1999 and one in 2002. Suffering from a lack of space, a historic city jail in Kannapolis, North Carolina, was chosen as the new location. Full renovation began in 2008, with the museum completed 7 months later in 2009.

Much of the renewed interest in the NC Music Hall of Fame was driven by music industry mogul Mike Curb who has ties to Kannapolis and is friends with David H. Murdock who was building the Kannapolis-based North Carolina Research Campus. He worked out a deal to lease and renovate the old city jail and police station. Curb also has his close friend and North Carolina native, music executive Eddie Ray, become operations director to oversee the day-to-day for the organization.

Mike Curb and Eddie Ray were both inducted into the Hall in 2009. Mike Curb for his contribution and support of the Hall of Fame and Eddie Ray for his lifetime achievement in the music non-performer category.

In 2012, the organization hosted its third induction ceremony which was open to the public. Being held at the Vintage Motor Club Conference & Events Center in nearby Concord, North Carolina allowed the group to sell tickets to the event.

== Criteria for inclusion ==
Musicians that were either born in North Carolina or have made it their home are eligible for induction 10 years after their entry into the music industry. Inductees are not limited to music performers, and producers, industry executives and educators are also eligible for induction.

== Inductees ==
Inductees are from virtually every genre of music, including Jazz, Opera, Hip Hop, Blues, Rock, Folk, Country, and Bluegrass. Some of the inductees include:

=== 1999 ===
- Chairmen of the Board
- Charlie Daniels
- Bill Griffin
- Kay Kyser
- Victoria Livengood
- Loonis McGlohon
- Billy Scott

=== 2002 ===
- Ronnie Milsap

=== 2009 ===
- The "5" Royales
- Johnny Bristol
- George Clinton
- John Coltrane
- Roberta Flack
- Johnny Grant
- Wilbert Harrison
- Ben E. King
- Thelonious Monk
- Clyde McPhatter
- Eddie Ray
- Max Roach
- Earl Scruggs
- Nina Simone
- Kate Smith
- James Taylor
- Randy Travis

Honorary member

- Mike Curb - Honorary member (2009)

=== 2010 ===
- Les Brown
- Shirley Caesar
- Donna Fargo
- Don Gibson
- Andy Griffith
- George Hamilton IV
- Oliver
- Don Schlitz
- Curly Seckler
- Arthur "Guitar Boogie" Smith
- Billy Taylor
- Doc Watson
- Maurice Williams

=== 2011 ===
- Billy "Crash" Craddock
- Michael English
- Ben Folds
- Anthony Dean Griffey
- John D. Loudermilk
- Clyde Moody
- Maceo Parker
- Billy Edd Wheeler

=== 2012 ===
- Tori Amos
- Lou Donaldson
- Fred Foster
- Stonewall Jackson
- Jodeci
- J. E. Mainer
- Nantucket
- Shirley Reeves & Doris Jackson

=== 2013 ===
- Alicia Bridges
- Tony Brown
- Rick Dees
- The Catalinas
- John P. Kee
- Del Reeves
- Grady Tate
- Willie Weeks

=== 2014 ===
- Clay Aiken
- Fantasia Barrino
- Jimmy Capps
- The Embers
- Little Eva
- Lulu Belle and Scotty
- Tab Smith
- Link Wray

=== 2015 ===
- Gerald Alston
- Nappy Brown
- Eric Church
- The Fantastic Shakers
- Warren Haynes
- Chuck Jackson
- Reverend Fairthcolth Barnes
- Jay Spell

=== 2016 ===
- The Avett Brothers
- Band of Oz
- Chuck Brown
- Carolina Chocolate Drops
- Percy Heath
- David Holt
- Kellie Pickler
- Ron Tyson

=== 2017 ===
- Anthony Hamilton
- Bucky Covington
- Etta Baker
- Jim Lauderdale
- Richard Lewis Spencer
- Sensational Nightingales
- Steep Canyon Rangers

=== 2018 ===
- Blind Boy Fuller
- Calvin Richardson
- Chris Daughtry
- Dolphus Ramseur
- John Tesh
- Luther Barnes
- The Hoppers

=== 2019 ===
- Elizabeth Cotten
- Merle Watson
- Mitch Easter
- 9th Wonder
- Big Daddy Kane

=== 2020 ===
- The Briar-Hoppers
- Donald Lawrence
- The Squirrel Nut Zippers
- Michael Mauldin
- Jermaine Dupri
- Charles Whitfield

=== 2022 ===
- Nnenna Freelon
- Janet Paschal
- Stephanie Mills
- Bernard Edwards
- Charlie Poole

=== 2023 ===
- Scotty McCreery
- Loudon Wainwright III
- Bill Curtis
- Fetchin Bones
- George Beverly Shea
- Betty Davis

=== 2024 ===
- Petey Pablo
- Clarence Avant
- Mary Cardwell Dawson
- Merge Records
- Tommy Faile
- Bobby Hicks

=== 2025 ===
- Luke Combs
- Robert Deaton
- Clyde Mattocks
- David Childers
- Hattie Leeper
- Dexter Romweber

=== 2026 ===
- MC Sha-Rock
- Gregory "Sugar Bear" Elliot
- Arrogance
- Barry Poss
- Billy Strayhorn
- George Clinton

== See also ==
- List of music museums
