= Billy Scott (singer) =

American singer-songwriter

- Born: Peter Pendleton; October 7, 1942; Huntington, West Virginia, United States
- Died: November 17, 2012 (aged 70) Charlotte, North Carolina, United States
- Genres: R&B
- Occupation: Singer-songwriter
- Instrument: Vocals,
- Label: North Carolina Music Hall of Fame
- Website: www.theprophets.com/fr_home.cfm

Billy Scott (October 5, 1942 – November 17, 2012) was an American R&B singer, who was lead vocalist for the group The Prophets, later known as "The Georgia Prophets", and eventually "Billy Scott & The Party Prophets". He was known for Beach music hits such as "I Got the Fever", "California" and "My Kind of Girl".

== Background ==
Billy Scott was born in 1942 as Peter Pendleton in Huntington, West Virginia.

In 1995 Billy and DJ Curtiss Carpenter formed the CAMMYS (Carolina Magical Music years) which today is known as the Carolina Beach Music Awards. The first in 1995 was held at the then Holiday Inn in Salisbury, North Carolina; the next two years were in Charlotte before it moved to its permanent home in Myrtle Beach, South Carolina.

Before forming The Prophets in 1965, he sang with various groups while in the Army, and after he was discharged in 1964 took the stage name "Billy Scott".

Billy Scott was the 1982 Male Single Artist of the Year at the Beach Music Awards.

Scott was the Chairman of the Beach Music Association International.

== Career ==
In 1968, he gained his first gold record for the song "I Got the Fever".

In the 1970s, he and his band recorded a number of songs in the beach music genre, a regional variant of R&B. Scott was a regular guest on the Jerry Peeler Beach Show on WANS radio in Anderson, South Carolina.

It was reported in the July 1982 issue of Mix that Billy Scott was in New River Studios in Fort Lauderdale working on his single which would be his second release on Lamon Records.

Billy Scott & the Prophets recorded the single, "My Kind of Girl" bw "All Aboard Too" which was released on Ruby Jude in 2000. It was a hit and it won Song of the Year and Ballad of the Year, and Scott also took home the 2001 Male Vocalist of the Year award. It was a number one hit on the Rhythm 'n' Beach Top 40 Chart during its 21-week run.

He also was a back up singer on Mariah Carey’s 1990 debut performance showcase by CBS and Sony.

== Later life and death ==
In 2006, Billy Scott released his final album and on Saturday November 17, 2012, he died of pancreatic and liver cancer at his home in Charlotte, North Carolina.
