= Curb Museum for Music and Motorsports =

Museum in Kannapolis, North Carolina, US

Coordinates: 35.4927°N 80.6320°W

Curb Museum for Music and Motorsports is a museum about music and NASCAR racing, both reflecting the business interests and passions of owner Mike Curb. The museum is located at 600 Dale Earnhardt Blvd in Kannapolis, North Carolina.

A long-time motorsports enthusiast, Curb is the owner and founder of Curb Records, a country music record label with such notable artists as Wynonna Judd, Tim McGraw, LeAnn Rimes, Hank Williams, Jr. and Lyle Lovett. Over the years, Mike Curb has owned cars driven by NASCAR legends including Dale Earnhardt, Richard Petty, Dale Jarrett, Ron Bouchard and Johnny Sauter.

The museum showcases NASCAR, IndyCar and modified race cars, as well as LeAnn Rimes’ very first car, a 1995 black Dodge Viper. The museum features the #2 car that Dale Earnhardt drove in his first Winston Cup Championship and the #43 car Richard Petty drove in his 199th Winston Cup win – sister-car to the one Petty drove in his 200th Winston Cup win that now resides at the Smithsonian Museum in Washington, DC. Images of popular recording artists cover the museum's walls, stand on life-sized cardboard cut-outs and also appear on the hoods of a few race cars. Displayed among the auto racing memorabilia are gold record awards, autographed posters from country and pop superstars and of photos of recording artists.

== North Carolina Music Hall of Fame ==
In December 2014, the North Carolina Music Hall of Fame relocated within Kannapolis to the Curb Museum for Music and Motorsports. Some of the Curb Museum's NASCAR cars and memorabilia were relocated to the nearby NASCAR Hall of Fame in Charlotte, North Carolina.

The North Carolina Music Hall of Fame features photographs and memorabilia of notable state musicians. Honorees include singers, musicians, musical groups, songwriters, record producers, disc jockeys, journalists, music educators and others involved in music.

== See also ==
- List of music museums
