= Tyrone Brown (gridiron football) =

American gridiron football player (born 1973)

No. 80, 83, 11
- Position: Wide receiver

Personal information
- Born: January 3, 1973 (age 53); Cincinnati, Ohio, U.S.
- Listed height: 5 ft 11 in (1.80 m)
- Listed weight: 168 lb (76 kg)

Career information
- High school: Withrow (Cincinnati)
- College: Toledo
- NFL draft: 1995: undrafted

Career history
- Atlanta Falcons (1995–1996); San Diego Chargers (1998)*; Toronto Argonauts (1999–2001); Indiana Firebirds (2003)
- * Offseason or practice squad member only

Career NFL statistics
- Receptions: 45
- Receiving yards: 523
- Touchdowns: 1
- Stats at Pro Football Reference

Career CFL statistics
- Receptions: 102
- Receiving yards: 1,484
- Touchdowns: 10

Career AFL statistics
- Receptions: 6
- Receiving yards: 62
- Touchdowns: 1
- Stats at ArenaFan.com

Tyrone Barry Brown (born January 3, 1973) is an American former professional football player who was a wide receiver in the National Football League (NFL), Canadian Football League (CFL) and Arena Football League (AFL). He played college football at Toledo. Brown played for the Atlanta Falcons of the NFL, Toronto Argonauts of the CFL and Indiana Firebirds of the AFL.
