= Hands Off (song) =

Single by Jay McShann
- B-side: "Another Night"
- Released: 1955
- Recorded: 1955
- Genre: R&B
- Length: 2:45
- Label: Vee-Jay
- Songwriter(s): Jay McShann

Jay McShann singles chronology
| "Hands Off" (1955) | "I've Got News for You" (1956) |

"Hands Off" is a 1955 song written and recorded by Jay McShann. The single, on the Vee-Jay label, was the most successful Jay McShann release on the Billboard R&B chart. "Hands Off", with vocals performed by Priscilla Bowman, was number one on the R&B best seller chart for three weeks. The single is notable because this was the last single to hit number one on the R&B chart without making the Billboard pop charts until 1976. For the next twenty-one years, all singles which made the top spot on the Billboard R&B chart would make the pop charts.

Preston Foster reworked "Hands Off" to create the 1956 song "Got My Mojo Working" popularised by Muddy Waters.
