= Carole Black =

American business executive

Carole Federle Black (born 1945), is the former President and Chief Executive Officer of Lifetime Entertainment Services, a multimedia brand for women, including Lifetime Network, Lifetime Movie Network, Lifetime Real Women Network, Lifetime Online and Lifetime Home Entertainment, serving from March 1999 to March 2005. Prior to that, Black served as the President and General Manager of NBC4, Los Angeles, a commercial television station, from 1994 to 1999, and in various marketing-related positions at The Walt Disney Company, a media and entertainment company, from 1986 to 1993. Black has served as a director of Time Warner Cable Inc. since July 2006.

Black was born in Cincinnati, Ohio, where she attended and graduated from Withrow High School in 1961. She was Withrow's first female student body president and a walk-on comedian in The Withrow Minstrels. She is a 1965 graduate of the Ohio State University. She married an Ohio State graduate student in the dental school, William Black, and for a time lived in Dayton, Ohio. She subsequently held a number of positions in Chicago, in advertising and marketing.
