= Teddy Bailey =

American football player (1944–2021)

No. 33, 37
- Position: Running back

Personal information
- Born: August 12, 1944; Cincinnati, Ohio, U.S.
- Died: December 23, 2021 (aged 77); Cincinnati, Ohio, U.S.
- Listed height: 6 ft 1 in (1.85 m)
- Listed weight: 225 lb (102 kg)

Career information
- High school: Withrow (OH)
- College: Cincinnati
- NFL draft: 1967: undrafted

Career history
- Buffalo Bills (1967); Boston Patriots (1969)

Career NFL statistics
- Games played: 3
- Stats at Pro Football Reference

William Theodore Bailey Jr. (August 12, 1944 – December 23, 2021) was a college and professional American football player. Bailey died in Cincinnati, Ohio on December 23, 2021, at the age of 77.

== See also ==
- List of American Football League players
