= I'll Be Home =

1955 song written by Stan Lewis

Single by The Flamingos
- B-side: "Need Your Love"
- Released: January 1956
- Recorded: October 1955
- Studio: Chess (Chicago)
- Label: Checker 830
- Songwriter(s): Ferdinand Washington, Stanley Lewis

"I'll Be Home" is a 1955 song that was written by Ferdinand Washington and songwriter, Stan Lewis.

Both the Flamingos and the Pat Boone versions feature a spoken recitation of the Bridge section.

== Flamingos version ==
The Flamingos first recorded the song in October 1955 at Chess' rudimentary office studio at 4750 South Cottage Grove using just two microphones and a tape recorder, then later at Universal Recording Corporation. Leonard Chess chose to release the less-polished version, recorded at Chess. The song was released on Chess' Checker Records subsidiary in January 1956, with The Flamingos version going to No. 5 on Billboard's R&B chart, its sales greatly overshadowed by the Pat Boone version released the same month.

== Pat Boone version ==
"I'll Be Home"

Single by Pat Boone

from the album Pat Boone
- B-side: "Tutti Frutti"
- Released: January 1956
- Recorded: December 1955
- Label: Dot
- Songwriter(s): Ferdinand Washington, Stanley Lewis
- Producer(s): Randy Wood

Pat Boone recorded the song in December 1955 with producer Randy Wood for Dot Records. Boone's version was released as a single with "Tutti Frutti" as the B-side in January 1956. Boone's version peaked at No. 5 on the US Billboard chart. Overseas, it was a number one hit in the UK Singles Chart, spending five weeks at No. 1, and 24 weeks on the charts altogether. It was the best-selling single of 1956 in the United Kingdom.

== Other versions ==
Slim Whitman featured a version on his hit 1977 album Home on the Range.
