= Curtis Anderson (American football, born 1957) =

American football player (born 1957)

No. 90
- Position: Defensive end

Personal information
- Born: May 16, 1957 (age 69); Cincinnati, Ohio, U.S.
- Listed height: 6 ft 6 in (1.98 m)
- Listed weight: 250 lb (113 kg)

Career information
- High school: Withrow (Cincinnati)
- College: Central State
- NFL draft: 1979: 5th round, 128th overall pick

Career history
- Dallas Cowboys (1979)*; Kansas City Chiefs (1979); Ottawa Rough Riders (1980); Michigan Panthers (1983); Oklahoma Outlaws (1984); Jacksonville Bulls (1985); Minnesota Vikings (1986)*; St. Louis Cardinals (1987)*; Green Bay Packers (1987)
- * Offseason or practice squad member only

Awards and highlights
- USFL champion (1983); NAIA All-American (1978); 3× NAIA All-District 22 (1976, 1977, 1978)

Career NFL statistics
- Games played: 6
- Stats at Pro Football Reference

Curtis Lee Anderson (born May 16, 1957) is an American former professional football player who was a defensive end in the National Football League (NFL) for the Kansas City Chiefs and Green Bay Packers. He also was a member of the Michigan Panthers, Oklahoma Outlaws and Jacksonville Bulls in the United States Football League (USFL). He played college football for the Central State Marauders.

== Early life ==
Anderson attended Withrow High School. He accepted a football scholarship from Central State University. He was a three-year starter at defensive end and also played defensive tackle occasionally in a five-man defensive line.

He led the team in sacks and tied for the lead in interceptions in his last three seasons. As a junior, he had 12 sacks in 10 games. As a senior, he registered seven sacks in nine games.

In 2011, he was inducted into the Central State University Athletic Hall of Fame.

== Professional career ==
Anderson was selected by the Dallas Cowboys in the 5th round (128th overall) of the 1979 NFL draft. He was waived on August 18.

On October 9, 1979, he was signed as a free agent by the Kansas City Chiefs to replace an injured Mike Bell. He was released on July 21, 1980.

In 1980, he signed with the Ottawa Rough Riders of the Canadian Football League. He was released on June 29, 1981.

On November 23, 1982, he was signed by the Michigan Panthers of the United States Football League. In 1983, he played only 3 games (2 starts) because of a hand injury, for a team that would become the USFL champion. He was selected by the Oklahoma Outlaws in the first round of the United States Football League expansion draft at the end of the season.

In 1984, he led the Outlaws in sacks with 11. At the end of the season, the league consolidated from 18 to 14 teams and Anderson was allocated to the Jacksonville Bulls. In 1985, he had 3 sacks. The league folded in 1986.

On July 23, 1986, he signed with the Minnesota Vikings. He left training camp on August 2.

On July 14, 1987, he was signed by the St. Louis Cardinals. He was released on August 2. After the NFLPA strike was declared on the third week of the season, those contests were canceled (reducing the 16 game season to 15) and the NFL decided that the games would be played with replacement players. In September, he was signed to be a part of the Green Bay Packers replacement team. He was released at the end of the strike.
