= Hearts of Stone =

Single by Otis Williams and the Charms
- B-side: "Who Knows"
- Released: September 1954
- Recorded: 1954
- Genre: R&B
- Length: 2:29
- Label: DeLuxe
- Songwriter(s): Eddie Ray, Rudy Jackson

Otis Williams and the Charms singles chronology
"Hearts of Stone" (1954)	"Ling, Ting, Tong" (1955)

"Hearts of Stone" is an American R&B song. It was written by Eddie Ray and Rudy Jackson, members of the San Bernardino, California-based rhythm and blues vocal group the Jewels (no relation to the female group the Jewels from Washington, DC) which first recorded it for the R&B label in 1954. The Jewels began as a gospel group, then became the Marbles, recording for the Lucky label out of Los Angeles. According to Johnny Torrence, leader of the Marbles/Jewels, it was taken from a song they recorded in their gospel days.

"Hearts of Stone" was covered and taken to the charts in 1954 by East Coast R&B vocal group the Charms, causing the story of the Jewels' involvement to be ignored by various writers and DJs who assume the Charms' cover was the original. The Charms' version of the song went to number one on the R&B Best Sellers and number fifteen on the pop charts.

== Other recordings ==
"Hearts of Stone" has also been recorded by:

- Ruby Wright (credited as Ruby Wells) on RCA Victor in 1954. This was the first recording of the song by a white performer and retained the original "I thought your daddy knew" lyric which was changed to "I thought you knew" in most cover versions.
- The Fontane Sisters on Dot Records in 1954. This version, arranged by Billy Vaughn, reached #1 on the Billboard in early 1955 and was the group's highest charting hit.
- The Chordettes on a 1955 Cadence Records EP, 8 Top Hits, largely duplicating the arrangement from the Fontane Sisters' recording.
- Connie Francis on a 1958 MGM Records single. This version generally followed the Fontane Sisters' recording but was slightly faster and featured an electric guitar outro.
- John Fogerty and The Blue Ridge Rangers in 1973, which reached number 37 on the Billboard Hot 100, and number 35 in Canada.
