= Barbara and the Browns =

American soul and gospel vocal group

Barbara and the Browns were an American soul and gospel vocal group, fronted by Barbara Jean Brown (Born 1st May 1935) (Died 3rd February 2010) who also recorded as a solo singer.

The group were from Memphis, Tennessee, and originally comprised Barbara Brown with her sisters Roberta, Betty, Maurice, and brothers Walter and Richard writing some of their material. In 1963 they auditioned with Chips Moman, intending to record gospel music, but Moman persuaded them to record his secular song "Big Party". The song was released as a single on Wilmo Records, and after it became locally successful the master was leased to Stax Records. The record rose to # 97 on the Billboard Hot 100 during a period when no R&B chart was being published. Stax released two more singles by the group, "In My Heart" and "I Don't Want Trouble" in 1964–65, but neither were commercially successful.

The group were then signed by Gene Lucchesi to the XL label, who recorded the group - and, then, Barbara as a solo artist - using producer Charles Chalmers. Several singles were released on the Cadet, Atco and Tower labels, and on XL itself. Although subsequently highly regarded by critics and aficionados of Southern soul, the records sold poorly at the time.

Barbara Brown did not record after 1972. A compilation of her recordings, Can't Find Happiness, including several unreleased recordings, was issued by Kent Records in 2007. She died in Detroit, Michigan on February 3rd 2010; she was 74 years old.

== Discography ==
=== Singles ===
- "You Belong to Her" / "Big Party" (Wilmo, 1963)
- "You Belong to Her" / "Big Party" (Stax, 1964)
- "In My Heart" / "Please Be Honest with Me" (Stax, 1964)
- "I Don't Want Trouble" / "My Lover" (Stax, 1965)
- "I Don't Want to Have to Wait" / "Plenty of Room" (Cadet, 1966)
- "Can't Find No Happiness" / "A Great Big Thing" (Atco, 1968)
- "There's a Look on Your Face" / "Things Have Gone to Pieces" (Tower, 1968)
- "You Don't Love Me" / "If I Can't Run to You I'll Crawl" (XL / Sounds of Memphis, 1971)
- "Pity a Fool" / "If It's Good to You" (Sounds of Memphis, 1972)
- "Big Party" / "Watch Dog" (Sounds of Memphis, 1972)
