= At My Front Door =

Single by The El Dorados

from the album Crazy Little Mama
- B-side: "What's Buggin' You Baby"
- Released: August 1955
- Recorded: 24 April 1955
- Studio: Universal Recording Corp. (Chicago)
- Genre: Doo-wop
- Length: 2:32
- Label: Vee-Jay
- Songwriter(s): Ewart Abner, John Moore

The El Dorados singles chronology
"One More Chance" (1955)	"At My Front Door" (1955)	"I'll Be Forever Loving You" (1955)

"At My Front Door" is a song written by Ewart Abner and John Moore and performed by The El Dorados. It reached #1 on the U.S. R&B chart and #17 on the U.S. pop chart in 1955. The song was featured on their 1957 album, Crazy Little Mama.

== Charting versions ==
- Pat Boone released a version of the song as a single in 1955 which reached #7 on the U.S. pop chart and #12 on the U.S. R&B chart.
- Dee Clark released a version of the song as a single in 1960 which reached #56 on the U.S. pop chart.

== Other versions ==
- The Modernaires released a version of the song as a single in 1955.
- Arthur Lee Maye and the Johnny Otis Orchestra released a version of the song as the B-side to his 1957 single "Honey Love".
- The Righteous Brothers released a version of the song as the B-side to their 1965 single "Justine".
- Harry Nilsson released a version of the song on his 1972 album Son of Schmilsson and featured in 1974 film Son of Dracula and on its soundtrack.
- The Darts released a version of the song as the B-side to their 1977 single "Love Bandit".
- Rockats released a version of the song on their 1981 album Live at the Ritz.

== Sampled ==
- DTV set The El Dorados' version of the song to the Silly Symphony The Wise Little Hen.
- De La Soul sampled The El Dorados' version on "Let, Let Me In" from their 1991 album De La Soul Is Dead.
