= Calvin Carter =

American songwriter (1925–1986)

Calvin Tollie Carter (May 27, 1925 – July 9, 1986) was an American record producer, record label manager and songwriter of jazz and pop songs.

Calvin Carter was born in Gary, Indiana, in 1925. He joined Vee-Jay Records, founded by his sister Vivian Carter and her husband James Bracken, in 1953 and became its principal A&R man and producer, in charge of recording sessions. According to AllMusic, he was responsible for giving "direction and vision" to the company, which mainly recorded R&B acts such as Elmore James, John Lee Hooker, Billy Emerson and Jimmy Reed. In the 1960s, Vee Jay Records was the first American company to sign The Beatles and helped to establish The Four Seasons as a major-selling group.

After Vee Jay was forced to close by financial problems, Calvin Carter worked at Liberty Records, running their soul subsidiary, Minit Records, for a while and working with Canned Heat. He produced leading blues artist, Little Milton for Chess Records in the late 1960s and Betty Everett for Fantasy Records in the early 1970s. He had first signed her for Vee Jay a decade earlier, producing several hits for her including "The Shoop Shoop Song". He recorded jazz musicians such as Eddie Harris and Gene Ammons while with Vee Jay.

His best-known song, "I Ain't Got You", was recorded by both Jimmy Reed and Billy Boy Arnold in 1955 and later covered by The Yardbirds in 1964 (as the B-side to their "Good Morning Little Schoolgirl" single), by The Animals on their 1965 UK release Animal Tracks, by Aerosmith in 1978 on their Live! Bootleg album, by Blue Öyster Cult in 1975 on their On Your Feet or on Your Knees album (as "Maserati GT (I Ain't Got You)"), by The Blues Brothers in 1980 on their Made in America album, by Molly Hatchet on their The Deed Is Done album, and by the Belgian band The Baboons in 2011 (on their Back Scratch album).

Burt Bacharach has stated that it was Calvin Carter who really gave him his first big break when Carter, who was head of A&R at Vee Jay Records, called him to say that Jerry Butler wanted to do his song 'Make It Easy On Yourself'. Carter asked him to fly out to New York and to basically take charge of the recording session. Bacharach said that was the first time anyone had allowed him to be in control. He said "I just went from there".

Carter died in Oak Forest, Illinois, in 1986, aged 61.
