= Annie Laurie (musician) =

American singer

- Born: Annie L. Page; August 11, 1924 (possible); Atlanta, Georgia, United States
- Died: November 13, 2006 (aged 82) (possible) Titusville, Florida, United States
- Genres: Jump blues, rhythm and blues
- Occupation: Singer
- Instrument: Vocals
- Years active: 1940s-early 1960s
- Labels: Various including Regal, De Luxe and Okeh

Annie Laurie (tentatively identified as Annie L. Page, August 11, 1924 – November 13, 2006) was an American jump blues and rhythm and blues singer. She is most associated with the bandleader and songwriter, Paul Gayten, although she also registered hit singles in her own name. Laurie first recorded in the mid-1940s and her professional career lasted until the early 1960s. Appraisal of her qualities appear to vary between Dinah Washington stating that Laurie was her favorite singer, to Irma Thomas, who opined – "Annie Laurie? She was okay."

She is best known for her cover version of "Since I Fell for You", and another US Top Ten R&B hit, "It Hurts to Be in Love."

== Life and career ==
Laurie was born in Atlanta, Georgia, United States. Her personal details are obscure, but she has been tentatively identified by blues researchers Bob Eagle and Eric LeBlanc as Annie L. Page, born there in 1924.

Her singing career started by vocalising for two territory bands led by Dallas Bartley and Snookum Russell, on the Chitlin' Circuit. In 1945, she recorded a version of "Saint Louis Blues" with the Bartley led band for Cosmo Records. She relocated to New Orleans, Louisiana, and was engaged by Paul Gayten. In 1947, she was performing in concert in New Orleans with Gayten, when the latter asked the young Fats Domino to come and play "Swanee River Boogie" on stage. Recording for both the Regal and De Luxe labels between 1947 and 1950, Laurie sang on several sides backed by Gayten's orchestra. Her first success was with her version of "Since I Fell for You" (1947), of which recording studio owner Cosimo Matassa said: "Annie Laurie did the first really good record that I liked... [She] was just fantastic, I mean nobody will ever make another version like that." She followed its success up with "Cuttin' Out" (1949), "You Ought To Know" (1950), "I Need Your Love" (1950), "Now That You're Gone" (1950) and "I'll Never Be Free" (1950). Laurie also toured with Gayten's orchestra in 1951.

Laurie's association with Regal Records ended in 1951, and she started recording for Okeh. By 1956 her releases were issued on Savoy Records, for whom she recorded in New York City with Hal Singer's orchestra, featuring guitarist Mickey Baker. Her biggest hit came in 1957 when De Luxe Records released "It Hurts to Be in Love," which was co-written by Julius Dixson and Rudy Toombs. Other releases with De Luxe included the Andy Gibson co-written track, "Hand in Hand" and "Love Is A Funny Thing (both 1957). In July 1960, Laurie appeared in concert, sharing the bill with Screamin' Jay Hawkins, the Five Satins, Joe Turner, Faye Adams, Ben E. King, and Nappy Brown, at Chicago's Regal Theater. The same month she had her final chart hit with "If You're Lonely."

By 1962, her affiliation had switched to Ritz Records, and she recorded several sides for them. However she left the music industry at this time, devoting herself to the Jehovah's Witnesses.

According to Eagle and LeBlanc, she died in Titusville, Florida, in 2006, aged 82.

== Discography ==
=== Chart singles ===
Year	Single	Chart positions	
Year	Single	US Pop	US R&B
1947	"Since I Fell for You"	—	3
1949	"Cuttin' Out"	—	6
1950	"I'll Never Be Free"	—	4
1957	"It Hurts to Be in Love"	61	3
1960	"If You're Lonely"	104	17

=== Compilation albums ===
Year	Title	Record label
1959	It Hurts to Be in Love	Audio Lab/King Records
1979	Creole Gal with Paul Gayten	Route 66 Records
1991	Regal Records in New Orleans with Paul Gayten	Specialty Records
2012	Rhythm & Blues Greats 1951–1959	Master Classics
2020	Since I Fell for You: The Essential Annie Laurie	Jasmine Records
2022	The Annie Laurie Collection 1945–62	Acrobat Records

== See also ==
- List of jump blues musicians
