= Gee Whittakers! =

1955 song by The Five Keys

"Gee Whittakers!" is a song written by Winfield Scott and originally recorded in 1955 by the Five Keys.

The lyrics prominently feature a number of contemporary teenage slang phrases. Billboard wrote in its November 5 review of the Five Keys' single: "The group wraps up a bright novelty 'Gee Whittakers!' in a bouncy, solidly commercial vocal treatment and a happy beat."

The original version reached number 14 on Billboard's R&B chart.

Later in 1955, the song was covered by Pat Boone, his version was a hit as well.
