= The El Dorados =

The El Dorados were an American doo-wop group, who achieved their greatest success with the song "At My Front Door", a no. 1 hit on the US Billboard R&B chart in 1955.

== History ==
The group formed in Chicago, Illinois, United States, in 1952, originally as "Pirkle Lee and the Five Stars". It comprised Pirkle Lee Moses Jr. (lead vocals), Louis Bradley and Arthur Basset (tenors), Jewel Jones (second tenor/baritone), James Maddox and Richard Nickens (both baritone/bass). When Moses Jr. got out of the United States Air Force in 1954, they changed their name to The El Dorados.

Vivian Carter heard them and signed them to her Vee-Jay Records label, making their first recordings in mid 1954. After a string of unsuccessful singles, they recorded "At My Front Door" (also known as "Crazy Little Mama") in 1955, and it rose to No. 1 on the US Billboard R&B chart, and No. 17 on the US pop chart. Their follow-up, "I’ll Be Forever Loving You", also made the R&B top ten in early 1956.

After Basset and Nickens left the group, they continued to record as a quartet. The original group split up in 1957. Moses stayed in Chicago and formed a new version of The El Dorados with John Brunson plus members of another group, The Kool Gents. Meanwhile, Bradley, Jones and Maddox moved to California, and renamed themselves The Tempos.

The label dropped The El Dorados in 1958, and Moses Jr. subsequently toured with a succession of backing vocalists. In 1969, he resuscitated the group name with new members, at the same time as a former member of The Tempos, Johnny Carter, also toured with another set of El Dorados. The two competing groups merged in the late 1970s, and subsequently continued to tour and record as The El Dorados until Moses' death in 2000.

After Moses's death, Norman Palm, a long-time member since the late 1970s, took over and renamed the group Pirkle Lee Moses Jr's El Dorados, in tribute to his long-time colleague and friend.

Clarence Wright & Larry Johnson joined sometime In the 1980s

Rufus Hunter(Formerly Of The Magnificents) was a member In the 1990s.

Louis Bradley Died On April 15, 1991.

Richard Nickens Died On August 3, 1991, From cancer.

Larry "Hi-C" Johnson died In 1999.

As of 2008, Pirkle Lee Moses Jr's El Dorados actively tours the Midwest, and the East Coast from time to time.

In 2013 The Lineup was, Norman Palm, Norman Palm Jr, Saalik Ziyad, and Clarence "Huffy" Wright.

Saalik Ziyad Died On February 12, 2019

James Maddox Died On January 4, 2022

== Discography ==
=== Singles ===
- Vee-Jay 115: "Baby I Need You" / "My Lovin' Baby"
- Vee-Jay 118: "Annie's Answer" / "Living with Vivian" (A-side with Hazel McCollum / B-side instrumental)
- Vee-Jay 127: "One More Chance" / "Little Miss Love"
- Vee-Jay 147: "At My Front Door" / "What's Buggin' You, Baby?"
- Vee-Jay 165: "I'll Be Forever Loving You" / "I Began to Realize"
- Vee-Jay 180: "Now That You've Gone" / "Rock 'n' Roll's for Me"
- Vee-Jay 197: "A Fallen Tear" / "Chop Ling Soon"
- Vee-Jay 211: "Bim Bam Boom" / "There in the Night"
- Vee-Jay 250: "Tears on My Pillow" / "A Rose for My Darling"
- Vee-Jay 263: "Three Reasons Why" / "Boom Diddle Boom"
- Vee-Jay 302: "Lights Are Low" / "Oh, What a Girl"
