= De Luxe Records =

Record company

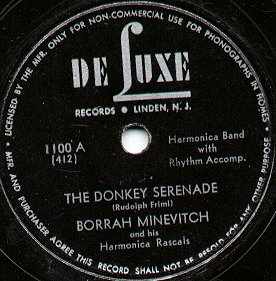
- Founded: 1944
- Founder: David Braun; Julius Braun
- Defunct: 1951
- Genre: Jazz, rhythm and blues
- Country of origin: U.S.
- Location: Linden, New Jersey

De Luxe Records (later DeLuxe Records) was a record company and label formed in 1944 by brothers David Braun (1908–1985) and Julius "Jules" Braun (1911–2002), the sons of Hungarian Jewish immigrants, in Linden, New Jersey. The label flourished in the 1940s and 1950s, notably for its rhythm and blues (R&B) and early rock and roll recordings.

Early recordings on the label covered a range of styles including R&B, gospel, jazz, and polka. The first singles on the label included some by the vocal group the Four Blues (who also recorded gospel as the Golden Echo Quartet), Billy Eckstine, and Benny Carter.

In 1947, the Braun brothers went to New Orleans seeking new talent, and discovered and signed bandleaders Paul Gayten and Dave Bartholomew, and singers Roy Brown and Annie Laurie. Brown had a national R&B hit the following year with "Good Rocking Tonight", a notable precursor of rock and roll. Several of the label's other New Orleans–based musicians also achieved success. Recording studio owner Cosimo Matassa said that the Braun brothers were the first talent scouts to go to New Orleans to record local musicians commercially.

In 1947, Syd Nathan, the founder and owner of King Records, purchased a majority interest in DeLuxe. The Braun brothers then set up another label, Regal Records. In 1949, Nathan moved the DeLuxe label to Cincinnati, Ohio and in 1951, after a bitter legal battle, he bought out the Braun brothers. Otis Williams and the Charms, The Manhattans and Donnie Elbert were among artists who recorded R&B hits for DeLuxe from the mid-1950s to the early 1970s.

== See also ==
- List of record labels
