= Withrow High School =

Public school in Cincinnati, Ohio, US

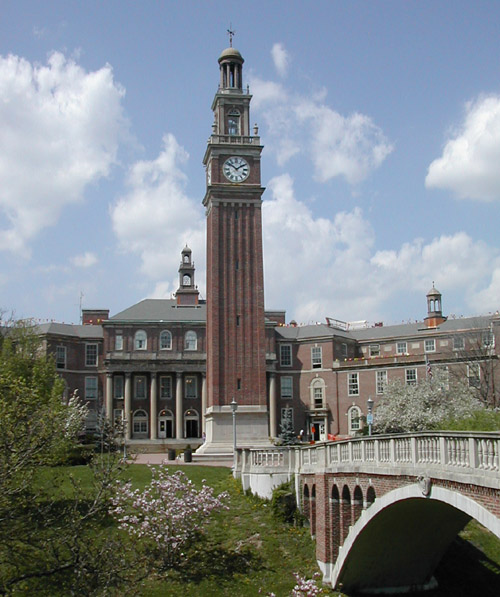
- Withrow High School entrance in 2007

Location
- 2520 Madison Road; Cincinnati, (Hamilton County), Ohio 45208; United States; 39°8′27″N 84°27′9″W

Information
- Type: Public, Coeducational high school
- Established: 1919
- Status: Open
- School district: Cincinnati Public Schools
- Superintendent: Shauna Murphy
- Principal: Stephen Lickert
- Teaching staff: 84.84 (FTE)
- Grades: 7-12
- Student to teacher ratio: 15.65
- Campus: Urban
- Colors: Black and Orange
- Athletics conference: Cincinnati Metro Athletic Conference
- Mascot: Tiger
- Team name: Tigers
- Accreditation: North Central Association of Colleges and Schools
- Withrow High School
- U.S. National Register of Historic Places
- Area: 14 acres (5.7 ha)
- Built: 1919
- Architect: Garber & Woodward
- Architectural style: Colonial Revival
- NRHP reference No.: 83001987
- Added to NRHP: January 19, 1983

Withrow High School (originally East Side High School) is a public high school located on the east side of Cincinnati, Ohio, United States. It is part of the Cincinnati Public Schools.

== History ==
The school opened in 1919 and was listed on the National Register of Historic Places in 1983. Frederick W. Garber's firm was involved in the school's design, known for its arching entry bridge, 114-foot (35 m) clock tower, plantings and trees, 27-acre (110,000 m^{2}) campus, and large sports complex.

== Notable alumni ==
- Curtis Anderson, former NFL and USFL player.
- Ethan Allen, former MLB player.
- Teddy Bailey, former NFL player.
- Carole Black, former president and CEO of Lifetime Entertainment Services.
- Tyrone Brown, former NFL player.
- Rosemary Clooney, former actress and singer.
- Shamika Cotton, actress
- Jimmie Dodd, former Disney Mousketeer and musician.
- Yancy Gates (born 1989), basketball player for Ironi Nahariya of the Israeli Premier League
- Paul Herget, astronomer and founder of the Minor Planet Center
- Joey Jackson, former NFL player.
- Al Lakeman, former MLB player.
- Ruth Lyons pioneer radio and television broadcaster
- Neil McElroy, former United States Secretary of Defense.
- Ron Oester, former MLB player.
- Louis Orr, former NBA player.
- Conrad Rucker, former NFL player.
- John Ruthven, wildlife artist.
- Tony Scott, former MLB player.
- Robert Surtees, cinematographer.
- LaSalle Thompson, former NBA player.
- Dwight Tillery, mayor of Cincinnati
- Devin Williams, professional basketball player
- Perry Williams, former NFL player.
- Le'Donn Mathis, first CPS athlete drafted into professional rugby.
