= The Five Keys =

American rhythm and blues vocal group

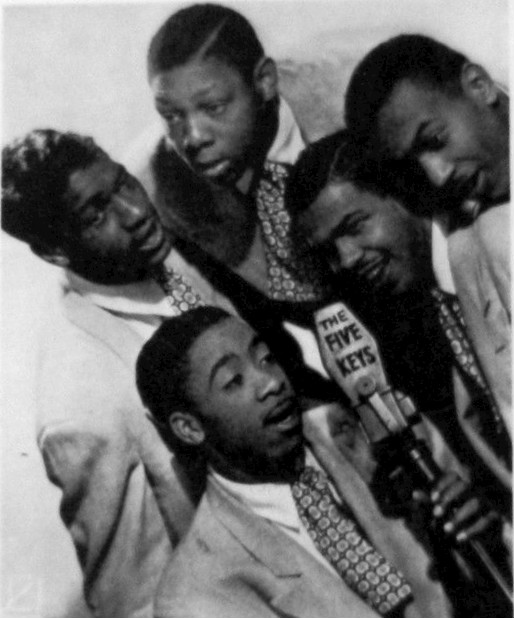
- The Five Keys in 1952

Background information
- Also known as: Sentimental Four
- Origin: Newport News, Virginia, US
- Genres: Rhythm and blues, doo-wop
- Years active: 1948–1962
- Labels: Aladdin Records, Capitol Records
- Past members: Charles "Bobby" Crawley; Edwin Hall; Raymond Haskiss; Ulysses K. Hicks; Raphael Howard Ingram; Ripley Ingram; "Rocky Mount" Joe Jones; Theodore "Pepper" Jones; "Virginia" Joe Jones; Ramon Loper; Gene Moore; Maryland Pierce; James "Dickie" Smith; Dickie Threat; Bernie West; Rudy West

The Five Keys were an American rhythm and blues vocal group who were instrumental in shaping this genre in the 1950s.

They were formed with the original name of Sentimental Four in Newport News, Virginia, US, in the late 1940s, and initially consisted of two sets of brothers – Rudy West and Bernie West, and Ripley Ingram and Raphael Ingram. Raphael Ingram left in 1949 and Maryland Pierce and Thomas 'Dickie' Threat became members in his place. At this juncture the name of the group was changed to The Five Keys.

They were signed to Aladdin Records in 1951, and in 1952 Rudy West left to join the United States Army, and he was replaced by Ulysses K. Hicks. When Hicks died of a heart attack in Boston in 1955, Rudy West returned to the group. In 1954 Dickie Smith left and was replaced with Ramon Loper. At this point the Five Keys were signed to Capitol Records, and their popularity increased, although more instrumentation was used.

The group was inducted into the Vocal Group Hall of Fame in 2002.

== Members ==
- Ulysses K. Hicks died from a heart attack in Boston, on February 1, 1955, at the age of 25.
- Raphael Howard Ingram died on August 16, 1984, at the age of 53.
- Theodore "Pepper" Jones died in Hampton, Virginia on May 4, 1990, at the age of 52.
- Charles "Bobby" Crawley died on March 31, 1992, at the age of 67.
- "Virginia" Joe Jones died from cancer on August 31, 1992, at the age of 59.
- Ripley Ingram died on March 23, 1995, at the age of 66.
- "Rocky Mount" Joe Jones died on November 30, 2006, at the age of 85.
- Rudy West died from a heart attack on May 14, 1998, at the age of 65.
- Edwin Hall died on September 3, 2001, at the age of 71.
- James "Dickie" Smith died on June 25, 2002, at the age of 68.
- Ramon Loper died after a short illness on October 16, 2002, at the age of 66.
- Dickie Threat, lead tenor from 1958 to 1961, died in Newport News, Virginia on October 9, 2007, at the age of 69.
- Bernie West died on December 22, 2018, at the age of 89.
- Maryland Pierce died on July 22, 2021, at the age of 89.

== Discography ==
=== Albums ===
- The Best of the Five Keys (Aladdin 1956)
- The Five Keys on the Town (Score 1957)
- The Five Keys on Stage (Capitol 1957)
- The Five Keys (King 1960)
- Rhythm and Blues Hits Past and Present (King 1960)
- The Fantastic Five Keys (Capitol 1962)

=== Singles ===
| Year | Titles (A-side, B-side) Both sides from same album except where indicated | Chart positions | | Album |
| Year | Titles (A-side, B-side) Both sides from same album except where indicated | US Hot 100 | US R&B | Album |
|---|---|---|---|---|
| 1951 | "The Glory of Love" b/w "Hucklebuck with Jimmy" | | 1 | Best of The Five Keys |
| 1951 | "It's Christmas Time" b/w "Old MacDonald" (Non-album track) | | | Best of The Five Keys |
| 1952 | "Yes Sir, That's My Baby" b/w "Old MacDonald" | | | Non-album tracks |
| 1952 | "Darling" b/w "Goin' Downtown (8-9-10)"; Unreleased | | | Non-album tracks |
| 1952 | "Be Anything But Be Mine" b/w "Red Sails in the Sunset" (from Best of The Five Keys) | | | Non-album tracks |
| 1952 | "Mistakes" b/w "How Long" | | | Non-album tracks |
| 1952 | "I Hadn't Anyone Till You" b/w "Hold Me" | | | Non-album tracks |
| 1952 | "I Cried for You" b/w "Serve Another Round" (from Best of The Five Keys) | | | Non-album tracks |
| 1953 | "Can't Keep From Crying" b/w "Come Go My Bail, Louise" | | | Non-album tracks |
| 1953 | "Mama (Your Daughter Told a Lie on Me)" b/w "There Ought to Be a Law (Against Breaking a Heart)" | | | Non-album tracks |
| 1953 | "These Foolish Things" b/w "Lonesome Old Story" (Non-album track) | | | Best of The Five Keys |
| 1953 | "Teardrops in Your Eyes" b/w "I'm So High" (Non-album track) | | | Best of The Five Keys |
| 1953 | "Oh Babe!" b/w "My Saddest Hour" | | | Best of The Five Keys |
| 1954 | "Love My Loving" b/w "Someday, Sweetheart" (Non-album track) | | | Best of The Five Keys |
| 1954 | "Deep in My Heart" b/w "How Do You Expect Me to Get It" | | | Non-album tracks |
| 1954 | "Ling, Ting, Tong" b/w "I'm Alone" (Non-album track) | 28 | 5 | The Fantastic Five Keys |
| 1955 | "Close Your Eyes" b/w "Doggone It, You Did It" | | 5 | The Fantastic Five Keys |
| 1955 | "My Love" b/w "Why, Oh Why" | | | Non-album tracks |
| 1955 | "The Verdict" b/w "Me Make Um Pow Wow" (Non-album track) | | 13 | The Fantastic Five Keys |
| 1955 | "Don't You Know I Love You" b/w "I Wish I'd Never Learned To Read" | | | Non-album tracks |
| 1955 | "'Cause You're My Lover" / | | 12 | Non-album tracks |
| 1955 | "Gee Whittakers!" | | 14 | Non-album tracks |
| 1956 | "Story of Love" b/w "Serve Another Round" (from Best of The Five Keys) | | | Non-album tracks |
| 1956 | "What Goes On" b/w "You Break the Rules of Love" | | | Non-album tracks |
| 1956 | "I Dreamt I Dwelt in Heaven" b/w "She's the Most" (from The Fantastic Five Keys) | | | Non-album tracks |
| 1956 | "Peace and Love" b/w "My Pigeon's Gone" | | | Non-album tracks |
| 1956 | "Out of Sight, Out of Mind" b/w "That's Right" | 23 | 12 | Non-album tracks |
| 1956 | "Wisdom of a Fool" b/w "Now Don't That Prove I Love You" (Non-album track) | 35 | | The Fantastic Five Keys |
| 1957 | "Let There Be You" b/w "Tiger Lily" | 83 | | On Stage! |
| 1957 | "It's a Groove" b/w "Four Walls" | | | Non-album tracks |
| 1957 | "The Blues Don't Care" b/w "This I Promise You" (Non-album track) | | | The Fantastic Five Keys |
| 1957 | "The Face of an Angel" b/w "Boom Boom" (from On Stage!) | | | Non-album tracks |
| 1957 | "Do Anything" b/w "It's a Cryin' Shame" | | | Non-album tracks |
| 1957 | "From Me to You" b/w "Whippety Whirl" | | | Non-album tracks |
| 1958 | "With All My Love" b/w "You're for Me" | | | Non-album tracks |
| 1958 | "Handy Andy" b/w "Emily Please" | | | Non-album tracks |
| 1958 | "One Great Love" b/w "Really-O Truly-O" | | | Non-album tracks |
| 1959 | "I Took Your Love for a Toy" b/w "Ziggus" | | | The Five Keys |
| 1959 | "Dream On" b/w "Dancing Senorita" | | | The Five Keys |
| 1960 | "How Can I Forget You" b/w "I Burned Your Letter" | | | The Five Keys |
| 1960 | "Gonna Be Too Late" b/w "Rosetta" | | | The Five Keys |
| 1960 | "I Didn't Know" b/w "No Says My Heart" (from Rhythm and Blues Hits - Past and Present) | | | Non-album track |
| 1960 | "Valley of Love" b/w "Bimbo" | | | Rhythm and Blues Hits - Past and Present |
| 1961 | "Stop Your Crying" b/w "Do Something for Me" | | | Rhythm and Blues Hits - Past and Present |
| 1962 | "Out of Sight, Out of Mind" b/w "You're the One" | | | Non-album tracks |
| 1962 | "From the Bottom of My Heart" b/w "Out of Sight, Out of Mind" | | | Non-album tracks |
| 1964 | "I'll Never Stop Loving You" b/w "I Can't Escape from You" | | | Rhythm and Blues Hits - Past and Present |
| 1967 | "Hey Girl" b/w "No Matter" | | | Non-album tracks |
| 1973 | "Goddess of Love" b/w "Stop - What You're Doing to Me" | | | Non-album tracks |
