= Vee-Jay Records =

American record label

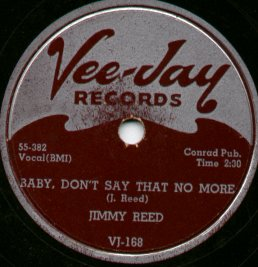
- Single by Jimmy Reed, 1956
- Parent company: Concord Records
- Founded: 1953
- Founder: Vivian Carter; James C. Bracken
- Genre: Jazz; blues; rock; R&B; disco
- Country of origin: U.S.
- Location: Gary, Indiana, Chicago, Illinois

Vee-Jay Records is an American record label founded in the 1950s, located in Chicago which releases blues, jazz, rhythm and blues, and rock and roll music. The label was founded in Gary, Indiana, in 1953 by Vivian Carter and James C. Bracken, a husband-and-wife team who used their initials for the label's name. Vivian's brother, Calvin Carter, ran the label's A&R. Ewart Abner, formerly of Chance Records, joined the label in 1955, first as manager, then as vice president, and eventually was president. One of the earliest Black American-owned record companies, Vee-Jay quickly became a major R&B label, with the first song recorded, the Spaniels' "Baby It's You," making it to the top 10 on the national R&B charts.

== Artists ==
Major acts on Vee-Jay in the 1950s included blues singers Jimmy Reed, Memphis Slim, and John Lee Hooker, and rhythm and blues vocal groups the Spaniels, the Dells, and the El Dorados. In the 1960s, the label became a major soul label with Jerry Butler, Gene Chandler, Dee Clark, and Betty Everett having hit singles on both the pop and R&B charts. Vee-Jay was also the first label to nationally release a record by the Pips (through a master purchase from the tiny HunTom label of Atlanta), who became Gladys Knight and the Pips in 1962 when they moved to Fury Records.

Vee-Jay had significant success with pop/rock and roll acts including the Four Seasons (their first non-black act) and the Beatles. Vee-Jay acquired the rights to some of the early recordings by the Beatles through a licensing deal with EMI Records, since EMI's American affiliate Capitol Records initially rejected issuing the Beatles records in the U.S. The main attraction at the time, however, was another EMI performer, Frank Ifield from the Sydney suburbs. Calvin Carter later said, "There was a number one record over in England at the time—it was 'I Remember You' by Frank Ifield. We took the record, and as a throw in, they had a group and asked us if we would take them, too. The group turned out to be the Beatles and we got a five-year contract on the Beatles as a pickup on the Frank Ifield contract."

In the mid-1960s, Vee-Jay signed the former successful child singer Jimmy Boyd, known for the hit "I Saw Mommy Kissing Santa Claus"; Boyd was then 25 years old. The company ventured into folk music with Hoyt Axton and the New Wine Singers, also picking up Little Richard who re-recorded his Specialty Records hits and recording "I Don't Know What You've Got (But It's Got Me)" which was released in 1965, an R&B success with Don Covay, Bernard Purdie, Ronny Miller, Billy Preston, and Jimi Hendrix (before Hendrix became successful on his own).

Vee-Jay's jazz line accounted for a small portion of the company's releases, but recorded artists including Eddie Harris, Wynton Kelly, Lee Morgan, and Wayne Shorter. Sid McCoy was A&R for the label's jazz releases. The company also had a major gospel line, recording the Staple Singers, The Famous Boyer Brothers, the Argo Singers, Swan Silvertones, the Caravans, Dorothy Love Coates, the Gospel Harmonettes, and Maceo Woods. Vee-Jay even released comedy on LP, with records by Dick Gregory, and Them Poems, Mason Williams' early nightclub act, recorded with a studio audience in 1964.

== Early history ==
Calvin Carter set up Vee-Jay's first rehearsal space in a garage at 47th Street and King Drive in Chicago in 1953, then discovered and signed Jimmy Reed. Carter also established a regular studio use arrangement with Universal Recording Corporation, one of the largest independent recording studios in the U.S.

== Success ==
Vee-Jay's biggest successes occurred from 1962 to 1964, with the ascendancy of the Four Seasons and the distribution of early Beatles material ("From Me to You" b/w "Thank You Girl," "Please Please Me" b/w "From Me to You," and "Do You Want to Know a Secret" b/w "Thank You Girl" via Vee-Jay; and "Love Me Do" b/w "P.S. I Love You" and "Twist and Shout" b/w "There's a Place" via its subsidiary Tollie Records), because EMI's autonomous United States' company Capitol initially refused to release Beatles records. Vee-Jay's releases were at first unsuccessful, but quickly became huge hits once the British Invasion took off in early 1964, selling 2.6 million Beatles singles in a single month. Cash flow problems, reportedly caused by Ewart Abner's tapping the company treasury to cover personal gambling debts, led to the company's temporary demise; Vee-Jay had been forced to temporarily cease operations in the second half of 1963, leading to royalty disputes with the Four Seasons and EMI. The Four Seasons then left Vee-Jay for Philips Records and Swan Records purchased the rights to the Beatles' "She Loves You," which failed to meet a sales quota to retain the rights to the band. EMI's Capitol Records picked up the U.S. rights for both the Beatles and Ifield.

Other Vee-Jay subsidiary labels included Interphon (which yielded a Top 5 hit, "Have I the Right?" by another British group, the Honeycombs from north London), and Oldies 45 for reissues along with Tollie and Abner Records, which was an early subsidiary label formed in 1958. Vee-Jay also did distribution for Champion Records (notable for producing the original version of Tainted Love) as well as Rick Hall's Fame Records and, for a time, the Memphis label Goldwax Records and Johnny Vincent's Ace Records. Vee-Jay moved back to Chicago in 1965 after a year in Los Angeles. Liens were placed on Vee-Jay assets still in Los Angeles after legal action by Pye Records, a British label, due to non-payment of royalties.

== As Vee-Jay International ==
Vee-Jay Records filed for bankruptcy in August 1966. The assets were subsequently purchased by label executives Betty Chiappetta and Randy Wood (not the Dot Records founder), who changed its name to Vee-Jay International. The Four Seasons' catalog was not included in the sale, as the band had negotiated a contract clause that in the event of bankruptcy would return the catalog to the band, which has retained them ever since.

From 1967 to 1972, Vee-Jay was limited to selling some of the inventory on hand when the company went under, and leasing or licensing the Vee Jay masters to Buddah Records, who came out with "The First Generation" series, and Springboard International, who issued dozens of albums featuring Vee Jay material on their subsidiary label, Upfront Records. In the 1970s, Vee Jay International itself re-released a number of titles on LPs and 8-track cartridges. In 1978, Vee Jay released a Silver Anniversary catalog to commemorate the 25th anniversary of the label.

== 1980s–present ==
The label was revived under new management in 1982 as a dance and R&B label, but closed in 1986. In the mid-late 1980s, a one-hour independent documentary film titled “Cradle of Rock and Roll" aired on PBS soon after its completion. It covered the history of Vee-Jay and Chess Records in Chicago, which helped to begin a revival of some interest in Vee-Jay's history and catalog. In 1986 Motown licensed 26 of Vee Jay's soul, blues, and R&B hits for a CD compilation, "Hits from the Legendary Vee Jay Records."

In 1993, the Vee Jay Limited Partnership released a 3-CD boxed set, "The Vee Jay Story (Celebrating 40 Years of Classic Hits)," again drawn from the label's R&B, soul, and blues catalog. The package includes a red-vinyl facsimile 45 of the Spaniels' "Goodnite Sweetheart Goodnite." Under the management of Michele Tayler, the company was reactivated in 1998 as The Vee-Jay Limited Partnership. Its main office is located in Redding, Connecticut. Collectables Records has remastered and reissued Vee-Jay albums on audio CD since 2000. A compilation which contains a Best of Vee-Jay box set as well as individual "Best of the Vee-Jay Years" CDs is released by Shout! Factory.

In July 2014 its catalogue was acquired by Concord Music Group. The sale was facilitated by Minneapolis film producer, Scott McLain. The Vee-Jay Records story is featured on the documentary series Profiles of African-American Success.

== Subsidiaries ==
Abner Records was a subsidiary of Vee-Jay Records. It was originally named Falcon Records, but the name was changed in 1958 since another Falcon Records already existed. The label was named after Ewart Abner who was general manager at Vee-Jay, 1955–1961. Falcon Records Scotland (2011–present) is a sub-label of Jilted Generation Inc. Falcon Records launched October 2011 in partnership with "Music Media Management" owned by Diania Elliott Tomlin Perkins & Eric Bryce, "In Hoodz We Trust (IHWT)" owned by Jay Supa & "Make Noise Fife" owned by Alex Herbert. Exodus Records was also a subsidiary of Vee-Jay, focusing largely on gospel music releases (such as early Billy Preston recordings) as well as being the label for some reissues of blues and jazz records.

== See also ==
- List of record labels
- Category:Vee-Jay Records albums
- Category:Vee-Jay Records artists
