= Otis Williams and the Charms =

American doo-wop group

- Also known as: The Charms
- Genres: Doo-wop
- Years active: 1950s
- Past members: Otis Williams; Bob Smith; Donald Peak; Rolland Bradley; Joe Penn; Richard Parker; Tony T-Money Middleditch

Otis Williams and the Charms were an American doo-wop vocal group in the 1950s, who were originally billed as The Charms. Williams is not related to Otis Williams of The Temptations.

== Career ==
Otis Williams (born June 2, 1936, in Cincinnati, Ohio, United States) attended Withrow High School in Cincinnati, and in 1952 joined an existing singing group in the school when one of its members was sick. The other original members were Bob Smith (tenor) (later replaced by Donald Peak), Rolland Bradley (tenor), Joe Penn (baritone/tenor), and Richard Parker (bass; December 31, 1936 – September 24, 2018).

The group, which Williams named The Charms, performed "Rags to Riches" in the Withrow Minstrels in May 1954, where they were seen in the opening show by Syd Nathan of King Records. Nathan only wanted to sign Williams, but Williams insisted on taking the rest of the group along. They signed immediately to a subsidiary label, Rockin' Records, based in Florida and owned by Henry Stone (later of TK Records), with Williams giving up a sports career to pursue singing instead. As a condition of their signing, Nathan required that The Charms pull out of The Minstrels, and so they did not appear in the subsequent five performances of the 1954 production.

The Charms' first record in June 1953, "Heaven Only Knows", was not a hit, and after a couple more releases they moved to another King subsidiary label, De Luxe Records, also run by Stone. They recorded several more times before, in 1954, "Hearts of Stone" gave them their first and biggest hit, reaching No. 1 on the R&B charts for nine weeks at the end of the year. It sold over one million copies, their first recording to do so, and was awarded a gold disc. It also reached No. 15 on the pop chart, with a cover version by the Fontane Sisters reaching No. 1.

The group had further R&B chart success with "Ling, Ting, Tong" and "Two Hearts", and they toured with The Clovers, Big Joe Turner and others. Another song recorded in 1955, written by Rudy Toombs, was "Gum Drop," a single issued on DeLuxe 6090 and labeled by Otis William and the Charms. It was very popular and covered by the Crew Cuts. Later pressings of this song, probably late 1955 listed the performance by Otis Williams and his "New Group." This change happened when, in late 1955, Stone persuaded the other members of the group that they could succeed without Williams, and they left to join Stone's new Chart label. After a court battle, Williams continued recording for DeLuxe, credited as Otis Williams and His Charms, and had another big hit in 1956 with "Ivory Tower" (No. 5 R&B, No. 11 Pop).

Williams continued to record for DeLuxe in the late 1950s, but with less success. He also co-produced and arranged Hank Ballard's original version of "The Twist", and helped arrange Little Willie John's "Fever". Peak, Bradley, Penn, and Parker, the Chart Records Charms, had their last recordings released in 1956. These recordings were, however, re-releases of older recordings that featured Otis Williams. The group made no other recordings.

Williams was drafted in 1960, and recorded sporadically as his army leave permitted. This also marked the breakup of his Charms. He was discharged in 1962 and recorded solo for another year, before retiring in 1963. He returned in 1965, recording soul music for the Okeh label. He took a further break, becoming a barber, and later relocated to Nashville, Tennessee, where he met Stop Records producer Pete Drake, who produced some records with his old backing group The Endeavors, then bet him that he could not make a country music album that sells, causing him to record Otis Williams and the Midnight Cowboys in 1971, claiming a fictitious all-black country band that was really some Nashville musicians including Elvis Presley's guitarist Scotty Moore.

In the 1990s, Williams returned to group harmony singing, touring internationally with a new Charms group, and, in 2001, being inducted to the United in Group Harmony Association Hall of Fame. Williams performed in Cincinnati with The Coda Band on November 24, 2007.

== Discography ==
Year	Title	Chart positions	
Year	Title	US	US R&B
1954	"Hearts of Stone"	15	1
1955	"Ling, Ting, Tong"	26	5
1955	"Bazoom (I Need Your Lovin')"	—	15
1955	"Two Hearts"	—	8
1956	"That's Your Mistake"	48	14
1956	"Ivory Tower"	11	5
1957	"United"	—	5
1961	"Little Turtle Dove"	95	—
1961	"Panic"	99	—
