= Ray Charles discography =

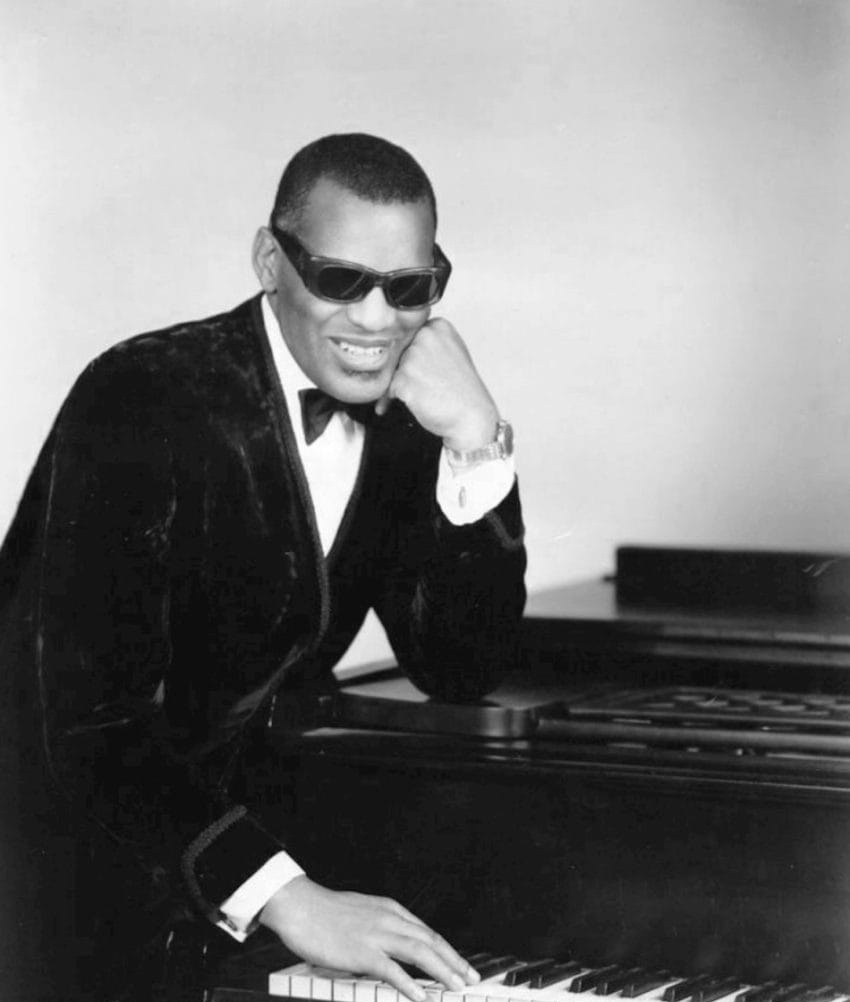
- Studio albums: 54
- Live albums: 7
- Compilation albums: 39
- Singles: 127

The discography of American musician Ray Charles consists of 54 studio albums, 7 live albums, 39 compilations albums, and 127 singles.

== Overview ==
Ray Charles first appeared on a Billboard chart in 1949, when — as part of the Maxin Trio with G.D. McKee and Milton Garred — he charted his first single with "Confession Blues." It reached No. 2 on the R&B chart, then called the Most-Played Juke Box Race Records. In 1952, Charles signed with Atlantic Records and went on to top Billboard's pop, country, R&B, jazz, and dance charts.

In the early 1960s, after leaving Atlantic Records to sign with ABC–Paramount, he negotiated for ownership of his own master recordings. He also established his own labels. Tangerine came first, which evolved into CrossOver Records. As a songwriter, Charles penned nearly 200 songs. He also operated his own publishing companies, Tangerine Music and Racer Music.

On the Billboard Hot 100, Charles had 80 hits between 1958 (the year the chart began) and 1990, when "I'll Be Good to You" became his last Hot 100 single, reaching No. 18. His biggest hit, "I Can't Stop Loving You", spent five weeks at No. 1 in 1962. He also topped the Hot 100 with the singles "Hit the Road Jack" and "Georgia on My Mind". Among all acts, he charted the third-most singles on the Hot 100; only Elvis Presley (with 108) and James Brown (91) had more.

On Billboard's R&B chart, Charles had 86 hits, including 11 chart-toppers such as "I've Got a Woman", "What'd I Say (Part 1)", "Hit the Road Jack", and "You Are My Sunshine."

Charles also reached No. 1 on the Hot Country Songs chart in 1985 with "Seven Spanish Angels", a duet with Willie Nelson. The single appears on Charles' duets album, Friendship, which reached No. 1 on Top Country Albums. His 1962 album, Modern Sounds in Country and Western Music, became his first album to top the Billboard 200.

In 1990, Charles had a No. 1 on the Hot Dance Club Songs chart with "I'll Be Good to You", a collaboration with Quincy Jones and Chaka Khan.

== Studio albums ==
=== The Atlantic years ===
Year	Album	Peak positions	Label
Year	Album	US	Label
1957	Ray Charles	35	Atlantic
1957	The Great Ray Charles	68	Atlantic
1958	Soul Brothers (with Milt Jackson)	—	Atlantic
1958	Yes Indeed!	32	Atlantic
1959	What'd I Say	20	Atlantic
1959	The Genius of Ray Charles	17	Atlantic
1961	Soul Meeting (with Milt Jackson)	—	Atlantic
1961	The Genius After Hours	49	Atlantic
1961	The Genius Sings the Blues	73	Atlantic
"—" denotes a releases that did not chart.

=== The ABC years ===
Year	Album	Peak positions			Certifications	US Label
Year	Album	US	US R&B	UK	Certifications	US Label
1960	The Genius Hits the Road	9	—	—		ABC
1961	Dedicated to You	11	—	—		ABC
1961	Genius + Soul = Jazz	4	—	—		ABC
1961	Ray Charles and Betty Carter	52	—	—		ABC
1962	Modern Sounds in Country and Western Music	1	—	6	RIAA: Gold	ABC
1962	Modern Sounds in Country and Western Music Volume Two	2	—	15	RIAA: Gold	ABC
1963	Ingredients in a Recipe for Soul	2	—	—		ABC
1964	Sweet & Sour Tears	9	—	—		ABC
1964	Have a Smile with Me	36	—	—		ABC
1965	Together Again	116	—	—		ABC
1966	Crying Time	15	1	—		ABC
1966	Ray's Moods	52	7	—		ABC / Tangerine
1967	Ray Charles Invites You to Listen	76	9	—		ABC / Tangerine
1968	A Portrait of Ray	51	5	—		ABC / Tangerine
1969	I'm All Yours Baby!	167	25	—		ABC / Tangerine
1969	Doing His Thing	172	34	—		ABC / Tangerine
1970	My Kind of Jazz	155	37	—		Tangerine
1970	Love Country Style	155	34	—		ABC / Tangerine
1971	Volcanic Action of My Soul	52	16	—		ABC / Tangerine
1972	A Message from the People	52	22	—		ABC / Tangerine
1972	Through the Eyes of Love	186	43	—		ABC / Tangerine
1973	Jazz Number II	194	48	—		Tangerine
"—" denotes a recording that did not chart or was not released in that territory.

=== 1973–2004 ===
Year	Album	Peak positions						Certifications	Label
Year	Album	US	US R&B	US Country	AUS	CAN	UK	Certifications	Label
1975	Renaissance	175	34	—	—	—	—		CrossOver
1975	My Kind of Jazz Part 3	—	55	—	—	—	—		CrossOver
1976	Porgy and Bess (with Cleo Laine)	138	30	—	63	—	—		RCA
1977	True to Life	78	23	—	—	—	—		Atlantic
1978	Love & Peace	—	35	—	—	—	—		Atlantic
1979	Ain't It So	—	59	—	—	—	—		Atlantic
1980	Brother Ray Is at It Again	203	52	—	—	—	—		Atlantic
1983	Wish You Were Here Tonight	—	—	29	—	—	—		Columbia
1984	Do I Ever Cross Your Mind	—	—	55	—	—	—		Columbia
1984	Friendship	75	—	1	87	81	—		Columbia
1984	The Spirit of Christmas	—	—	42	—	—	—		Columbia
1986	From the Pages of My Mind	—	—	16	—	—	—		Columbia
1988	Just Between Us	—	68	—	—	—	—		Columbia
1990	Would You Believe?	—	61	—	—	—	—		Qwest/Warner Bros.
1993	My World	145	53	—	—	—	—		Qwest/Warner Bros.
1996	Strong Love Affair	—	85	—	—	—	—		Qwest/Warner Bros.
2002	Thanks for Bringing Love Around Again	178	30	—	—	—	—		E-Nate/Welk Music Group; XIII Bis
2004	Genius Loves Company	1	4	—	4	1	18	RIAA: 3× Platinum; ARIA: Platinum; BPI: Gold	Concord
"—" denotes a recording that did not chart or was not released in that territory.

=== Posthumous albums ===
Year	Album	Peak positions					Label
Year	Album	US	US R&B	US Jazz	CAN	UK	Label
2005	Genius & Friends	36	14	2	72	142	Rhino
2025	No One Does It Like.. Ray Charles !						Tangerine
"—" denotes a recording that did not chart or was not released in that territory.

=== Compilations ===
Hundreds of Ray Charles compilations and "Greatest Hits/Best Of" albums have been released and continue to be produced and released by various labels around the world. Some of the more notable compilations include:

- 1958: Ray Charles (Coronet)
- 1959: The Original Ray Charles (Hollywood)
- 1959: The Fabulous Ray Charles (Hollywood)
- 1961: Do the Twist! with Ray Charles (Atlantic) [reissued as The Greatest Ray Charles]
- 1962: The Ray Charles Story, Volume One (Atlantic) (#12 US)
- 1962: The Ray Charles Story, Volume Two (Atlantic)
- 1962: Ray Charles' Greatest Hits(ABC-Paramount) (#5 US)
- 1963: The Ray Charles Story, Volume Three (Atlantic)
- 1964: The Ray Charles Story, Volume Four (Atlantic)
- 1967: A Man And His Soul (ABC)
- 1970: The Best of Ray Charles (Atlantic) (BPI: Silver)
- 1971: A 25th Anniversary in Show Business Salute to Ray Charles (ABC) (#152 US)
- 1973: Ray Charles Live (Atlantic)
- 1978: The Tender Side of Ray Charles (Suffolk Marketing, Inc.)
- 1980: Heart to Heart (Endeavour) (AUS #46)
- 1982: A Life in Music (Atlantic/Deluxe)
- 1987: Ray Charles – His Greatest Hits, Volume 1/Volume 2 (DCC Compact Classics)
- 1988: Ray Charles Anthology (Rhino) [1960–1972 ABC material]
- 1989: Seven Spanish Angels and Other Hits (Columbia)
- 1990: The Collection (Castle Communications) (AUS #34)
- 1991: The Classic Years (Castle Communications) (AUS #19)
- 1991: The Birth of Soul: The Complete Atlantic R&B Recordings 1952–1959 (Atlantic)
- 1992: The Collection Volume 2 (Castle Communications)
- 1993: Ray Charles – Blues + Jazz (Rhino)
- 1994: The Best of Ray Charles: The Atlantic Years (Rhino)
- 1995: Jazz & Blues Collection, Vol. 3 (Charly/Editions Atlas)
- 1996: The Complete Swing Time & Down Beat Recordings 1949–1952 (Night Train International)
- 1997: Genius & Soul: The 50th Anniversary Collection (Rhino)
- 1998: The Complete Country & Western Recordings, 1959–1986 (Rhino)
- 1999: Ultimate Hits Collection (Rhino/WEA)
- 2000: The Very Best of Ray Charles, Volume 1/Volume 2 (Rhino/WEA)
- 2001: The Definitive Ray Charles (Rhino/WEA) (BPI: Gold)
- 2002: Ray Charles Sings for America (Rhino)
- 2003: Ray Charles in Concert (Rhino Handmade)
- 2004: RAY (Rhino/WEA) (AUS #7) (BPI: Gold)
- 2004: The Best of Ray Charles Live (Essentials)
- 2005: Pure Genius: The Complete Atlantic Recordings (1952–1959) (Atlantic)
- 2009: Genius! The Ultimate Ray Charles Collection (Concord)
- 2011: Singular Genius: The Complete ABC Singles (Concord)
- 2011: The Complete Early Recordings 1949–1952 (JSP Records)
- 2017: An Introduction to Ray Charles (Atlantic)
- 2020: One Two Three Songs
- 2021: True Genius (Tangerine) 6-CD 'limited edition' boxed set

== Singles ==
=== Down Beat, Swing Beat, Swing Time releases ===
1949: The McSon Trio (a.k.a. Maxin Trio and Maxim Trio):

- "I Love You, I Love You (I Will Never Let You Go)" / "Confession Blues"

"Confession Blues" reached No. 2 on the U.S. R&B charts.

- "Blues Before Sunrise" / "How Long Blues"
- "A Sentimental Blues" / "You'll Never Miss the Water (Until the Well's Gone Dry)"
- "Alone in the City" / "Can Anyone Ask for More?"
- "Rockin' Chair Blues" / "Let's Have a Ball" (a.k.a. "Here I Am")
- "If I Give You My Love" / "This Love of Mine" (a.k.a. "The Honey Bee")
- "Ain't That Fine" / "Don't Put All Your Dreams in One Basket"

1949–1953: Ray Charles, The Ray Charles Trio:

- "I've Had My Fun (Going Down Slow)" / "Sitting on Top of the World (Now She's Gone)" (1949)
- "See See Rider" / "What Have I Done?" (1950)
- "She's on the Ball" / "Honey, Honey" (1950)
- "Th' Ego Song" ("Sweet as Can Be") / "Late in the Evening" (1950)
- "Some Day" (a.k.a. "Worried Life Blues"/"Someday Baby") / "I'll Do Anything but Work" (1950)
- "I Wonder Who's Kissing Her Now" / "All to Myself" (1951)
- "Lonely Boy" / "Baby Let Me Hold Your Hand" (1951)

"Baby Let Me Hold Your Hand" reached No. 5 on the U.S. R&B charts.

- "I'm Glad for Your Sake" / "Kissa Me Baby" (1952)

"Kissa Me Baby" reached No. 8 on the U.S. R&B charts.

- "Baby Won't You Please Come Home" / "Hey Now" (1952)
- "Baby Let Me Hear You Call My Name" / "Guitar Blues" (B-side by Rufus Beacham Orchestra) (1952)
- "I Can't Do No More" / "Roly Poly" (a.k.a. "Back Home") (B-side by Rufus Beacham Orchestra) (1952)
- "Walkin' and Talkin' to Myself" / "I'm Wonderin' and Wonderin'" (1952)
- "Misery in My Heart" / "The Snow Is Falling (Snowfall)" (1953)

=== Atlantic releases ===
The list of singles below are songs Ray Charles released while on the Atlantic label between 1952 and 1980.

Year	Single	Peak positions		Certifications	Album
Year	Single	US	US R&B	Certifications	Album
1952	"Roll with My Baby" b/w "The Midnight Hour" (from The Genius Sings the Blues (1961))	—	—		What'd I Say (1959)
1953	"The Sun's Gonna Shine Again" b/w "Jumpin' in the Mornin'" (from What'd I Say (1959))	—	—		Yes Indeed! (1958)
1953	"Mess Around" b/w "Funny (But I Still Love You)"	—	3		Ray Charles (1957)
1953	"Feelin' Sad" b/w "Heartbreaker" (from Yes Indeed! (1958))	—	—		The Genius Sings the Blues (1961)
1954	"It Should've Been Me" b/w "Sinner's Prayer" (from Ray Charles (1957))	—	5		The Ray Charles Story (Volume One)
1954	"Don't You Know" b/w "Losing Hand"	—	10		Ray Charles (1957)
1954	"I Got a Woman" /	—	1	BPI: Silver	Ray Charles (1957)
1954	"Come Back"	—	4		Ray Charles (1957)
1955	"This Little Girl of Mine" /	—	9		Ray Charles (1957)
1955	"A Fool for You"	—	1		Ray Charles (1957)
1955	"Blackjack" /	—	8		Yes Indeed! (1958)
1955	"Greenbacks"	—	5		Ray Charles (1957)
1956	"Drown in My Own Tears" /	—	1		Ray Charles (1957)
1956	"Mary Ann"	—	1		Ray Charles (1957)
1956	"Hallelujah I Love Her So" /	—	5		Ray Charles (1957)
1956	"What Would I Do Without You"	—	5		Yes Indeed! (1958)
1956	"Lonely Avenue" b/w "Leave My Woman Alone"	—	6		Yes Indeed! (1958)
1957	"Ain't That Love" b/w "I Want to Know" (from Yes Indeed! (1958))	—	9		Ray Charles (1957)
1957	"It's All Right" b/w "Get on the Right Track Baby"	—	—		Yes Indeed! (1958)
1957	"Swanee River Rock" b/w "I Want a Little Girl"	34	14		Yes Indeed! (1958)
1958	"Talkin' 'bout You" b/w "What Kind of Man Are You" (from What'd I Say)	—	—		Yes Indeed! (1958)
1958	"Yes Indeed" b/w "I Had a Dream"	—	—		Yes Indeed! (1958)
1958	"My Bonnie" b/w "You Be My Baby"	—	—		What'd I Say (1959)
1958	"Rockhouse (Part 2)" b/w "Rockhouse (Part 1)"	79	14		What'd I Say (1959)
1959	"Night Time Is the Right Time" b/w "Tell All the World About You" (from What'd I Say (1959))	95	5		The Genius Sings the Blues (1961)
1959	"That's Enough" b/w "Tell Me How Do You Feel"	—	19		What'd I Say (1959)
1959	"What'd I Say (Part 1)" b/w "What'd I Say (Part 2)"	6	1		What'd I Say (1959)
1959	"I'm Movin' On" b/w "I Believe to My Soul"	40	11		The Genius Sings the Blues (1961)
1960	"Let the Good Times Roll" /	78	—		The Genius of Ray Charles (1959)
1960	"Don't Let the Sun Catch You Cryin'" /	95	17		The Genius of Ray Charles (1959)
1960	"Just for a Thrill" b/w "Heartbreaker" (from Yes Indeed! (1958))	—	16		The Genius of Ray Charles (1959)
1960	"Tell the Truth" b/w "Sweet Sixteen Bars" (from The Ray Charles Story (Volume One))	—	13		Do the Twist with Ray Charles
1960	"Come Rain or Come Shine" b/w "Tell Me You'll Wait for Me"	83	—		The Genius of Ray Charles (1959)
1960	"Doodlin' (Part 1)" b/w "Doodlin (Part 2)"	—	—		The Great Ray Charles
1961	"Early in the Mornin'" b/w "A Bit of Soul" (from The Ray Charles Story Volume 4)	—	—		The Genius Sings the Blues (1961)
1961	"Am I Blue" b/w "It Should've Been Me" (from The Ray Charles Story (Volume One))	—	—		The Genius of Ray Charles (1959)
1961	"Hard Times (No One Knows Better Than I)" b/w "I Wonder Who"	—	—		The Genius Sings the Blues (1961)
1963	"Feelin' Sad" b/w "Carrying That Load" (from The Great Hits of Ray Charles)	113	—		The Genius Sings the Blues (1961)
1964	"Talkin' 'bout You"" b/w "In a Little Spanish Town" (from The Ray Charles Story Volume 4)	—	—		Yes Indeed! (1958)
1968	"Come Rain or Come Shine" (Reissue) b/w "Tell Me You'll Wait for Me"	98	30		The Genius of Ray Charles (1959)
1977	"I Can See Clearly Now" b/w "Anonymous Love"	—	25		True to Life
1978	"Game Number Nine" b/w "A Peace That We Never Before Could Enjoy" (from Love & Peace)	—	37		True to Life
1978	"Ridin' Thumb" b/w "You Forgot Your Memory" (Non-album track)	—	32		Love & Peace
1979	"Some Enchanted Evening" b/w "You 20th Century Fox" (from Love & Peace)	—	41		Ain't It So
1979	"Just Because" b/w "Love Me or Set Me Free"	—	78		Ain't It So
1980	"Compared to What" b/w "Now That We've Found Each Other"	—	33		Brother Ray Is at It Again!
"—" denotes a recording that did not chart or was not released in that territory.

=== ABC releases ===
This list below is of songs Ray Charles released on the ABC-Paramount, ABC, and subsidiary Impulse and Tangerine/TRC labels from 1960 to 1973.

Year	Single Both sides from same album except where indicated	Peak positions						Sales	Certifications	Album
Year	Single Both sides from same album except where indicated	US	US R&B	US AC	CAN	CAN AC	UK	Sales	Certifications	Album
1960	"My Baby! (I Love Her, Yes I Do)" b/w "Who You Gonna Love"	—	—	—	—	—	—			Non-album tracks
1960	"Sticks and Stones" b/w "Worried Life Blues" (Non-album track)	40	2	—	—	—	—			Ray Charles' Greatest Hits
1960	"Georgia on My Mind" b/w "Carry Me Back to Old Virginny"	1	3	—	—	—	24			The Genius Hits the Road
1960	"Ruby" /	28	10	—	—	—	—			Dedicated to You
1960	"Hardhearted Hannah"	55	—	—	—	—	—			Dedicated to You
1960	"Them That Got" b/w "I Wonder"	58	10	—	—	—	—			Ray Charles' Greatest Hits
1961	"One Mint Julep" b/w "Let's Go"	8	1	—	—	—	—			Genius + Soul = Jazz
1961	"I've Got News for You" /	66	8	—	—	—	—			Genius + Soul = Jazz
1961	"I'm Gonna Move to the Outskirts of Town"	84	25	—	—	—	—			Genius + Soul = Jazz
1961	"Hit the Road Jack" b/w "The Danger Zone"	1	1	—	—	—	6		BPI: Gold	Ray Charles' Greatest Hits
1961	"Unchain My Heart" /	9	1	—	—	—	—			Ray Charles' Greatest Hits
1961	"But on the Other Hand Baby"	72	10	—	—	—	—			Ray Charles' Greatest Hits
1962	"Baby, It's Cold Outside" b/w "We'll Be Together Again" (Both tracks with Betty Carter)	91	—	—	—	—	—			Ray Charles & Betty Carter
1962	"Hide Nor Hair" /	20	7	—	—	—	—			Non-album tracks
1962	"At the Club"	44	7	—	—	—	—			Non-album tracks
1962	"I Can't Stop Loving You" /	1	1	1	1	—	1			Modern Sounds in Country and Western Music
1962	"Born to Lose"	41	—	13	—	—	—			Modern Sounds in Country and Western Music
1962	"You Don't Know Me" /	2	5	1	—	—	9			Modern Sounds in Country and Western Music
1962	"Careless Love"	60	—	19	—	—	—			Modern Sounds in Country and Western Music
1962	"You Are My Sunshine" /	7	1	—	—	—	—			Modern Sounds in Country and Western Music, Volume Two
1962	"Your Cheatin' Heart"	29	23	7	—	—	13			Modern Sounds in Country and Western Music, Volume Two
1963	"Don't Set Me Free" /	20	9	—	—	—	37			Non-album tracks
1963	"The Brightest Smile in Town"	92	—	—	—	—	—			Non-album tracks
1963	"Take These Chains from My Heart" /	8	7	3	—	—	5			Modern Sounds in Country and Western Music, Volume Two
1963	"No Letter Today"	105	—	—	—	—	—			Modern Sounds in Country and Western Music, Volume Two
1963	"No One" /	21	9	6	—	—	35			Non-album tracks
1963	"Without Love (There Is Nothing)"	29	15	—	—	—	—			Non-album tracks
1963	"Busted" /	4	3	—	—	—	21			Ingredients in a Recipe for Soul
1963	"Making Believe"	102	—	—	—	—	—			Modern Sounds in Country and Western Music, Volume Two
1964	"That Lucky Old Sun" b/w "Ol' Man Time"	20	—	10	—	—	—			Ingredients in a Recipe for Soul
1964	"My Heart Cries for You" /	38	^{[A]} 9	12	—	—	—			Non-album track
1964	"Baby, Don't You Cry"	39	^{[A]} 7	—	—	—	—			Sweet and Sour Tears
1964	"My Baby Don't Dig Me" b/w "Something's Wrong"	51	^{[A]} 13	—	—	—	—			Non-album tracks
1964	"A Tear Fell" /	50	^{[A]} 13	6	39	—	—			Sweet and Sour Tears
1964	"No One to Cry To"	55	^{[A]} 14	8	—	—	38			Sweet and Sour Tears
1964	"Smack Dab in the Middle" b/w "I Wake Up Crying" (Non-album track)	52	^{[A]} 19	13	—	—	—			Have a Smile with Me
1965	"Makin' Whoopee" b/w "Makin' Whoopee" (Instrumental)	46	^{[A]} 10	11	—	—	42			Live In Concert
1965	"Cry" /	58	—	11	44	—	—			Sweet and Sour Tears
1965	"Teardrops from My Eyes"	112	—	—	—	—	—			Sweet and Sour Tears
1965	"I Gotta Woman" (Part One) b/w "I Gotta Woman" (Part Two)	79	—	—	—	—	—			Live in Concert
1965	"Without a Song" (Part 1) b/w "Without a Song" (Part 2)	112	—	—	—	—	—			Non-album tracks
1965	"I'm a Fool to Care" b/w "Love's Gonna Live Here (Swingova)"	84	—	22	26	—	—			Non-album tracks
1965	"The Cincinnati Kid" b/w "That's All I Am to You"	115	—	19	—	—	—			Non-album tracks
1966	"Crying Time" b/w "When My Dreamboat Comes Home" (Non-album track)	6	5	1	4	—	50			Crying Time
1966	"Together Again" /	19	10	1	17	—	48			Country and Western Meets Rhythm and Blues
1966	"You're Just About to Lose Your Clown"	91	—	—	—	—	—			Crying Time
1966	"Let's Go Get Stoned" b/w "The Train" (Non-album track)	31	1	—	57	—	—	US: 500,000		Crying Time
1966	"I Chose to Sing the Blues" b/w "Hopelessly" (Non-album track)	32	22	—	44	—	—	US: 200,000		A Man and His Soul
1966	"Please Say You're Fooling" /	64	—	30	68	—	—			Ray's Moods
1966	"I Don't Need No Doctor"	72	45	—	—	—	—			A Man and His Soul
1967	"I Want to Talk About You" /	98	—	—	—	—	—			Non-album tracks
1967	"Something Inside Me"	112	—	—	—	—	—			Non-album tracks
1967	"Here We Go Again" /	15	5	38	12	—	38			Ray Charles Invites You to Listen
1967	"Somebody Ought to Write a Book About It"	105	—	—	—	—	—			Non-album tracks
1967	"In the Heat of the Night" b/w "Something's Got to Change"	33	21	—	36	—	—			Non-album tracks
1967	"Yesterday" b/w "Never Had Enough of Nothing Yet" (Non-album track)	25	9	—	24	—	44			Ray Charles Invites You to Listen
1968	"That's a Lie" b/w "Go On Home"	64	11	—	—	—	—			Non-album tracks
1968	"Eleanor Rigby" /	35	30	33	45	—	36			A Portrait of Ray
1968	"Understanding"	46	13	—	—	—	—			A Portrait of Ray
1968	"Sweet Young Thing Like You" /	83	—	—	57	—	—			A Portrait of Ray
1968	"Listen, They're Playing My Song"	92	—	—	—	—	—			Non-album track
1969	"If It Wasn't for Bad Luck" / (with Jimmy Lewis)	77	21	—	66	—	—			Doing His Thing
1969	"When I Stop Dreaming"	112	—	25	—	—	—			A Portrait of Ray
1969	"I Didn't Know What Time It Was" b/w "I'll Be Your Servant" (Non-album track)	105	—	—	74	18	—			I'm All Yours Baby!
1969	"Let Me Love You" b/w "I'm Satisfied"	94	28	—	64	—	—			Non-album tracks
1969	"We Can Make It" b/w ""I Can't Stop Loving You Baby" (Non-album track)	101	31	—	93	—	—			Doing His Thing
1970	"Claudie Mae" b/w "Someone to Watch over Me"	111	—	—	—	—	—			Non-album tracks
1970	"Laughin and Clownin" b/w "That Thing Called Love" (from Doing His Thing)	98	18	—	—	—	—			Non-album tracks
1970	"If You Were Mine" b/w "Till I Can't Take It Anymore"	41	19	26	65	—	—			Love Country Style
1971	"Don't Change on Me" /	36	13	22	—	—	—			Love Country Style
1971	"Sweet Memories"	—	—	27	—	5	—			Love Country Style
1971	"Booty Butt" b/w "Sidewinder" (Both tracks as The Ray Charles Orchestra)	36	13	—	—	—	—			My Kind of Jazz
1971	"Feel So Bad" b/w "Your Love Is So Doggone Good" (from Love Country Style)	68	16	—	—	—	—			Volcanic Action of My Soul
1972	"What Am I Living For" b/w "Tired of My Tears" (Non-album track)	54	—	20	—	—	—			Volcanic Action of My Soul
1972	"Look What They've Done to My Song, Ma" b/w "America the Beautiful"	65	25	—	—	—	—			A Message from the People
1972	"Hey Mister" b/w "There'll Be No Peace Without All Men as One"	115	47	—	—	—	—			A Message from the People
1973	"I Can Make It Thru the Days (But Oh Those Lonely Nights)" b/w "Ring of Fire" (From Love Country Style)	81	21	—	—	—	—			Through the Eyes of Love
	"—" denotes a recording that did not chart or was not released in that territory.									

- AThrough a period between November 1963 and January 1965, Billboard Magazine did not publish an R&B singles chart. Positions shown are from the Cashbox RnB Charts during this period.

=== CrossOver releases ===
This list below is of songs Ray Charles released while on the CrossOver label from 1973 to 1976.

Year	Single	Peak positions						Album
Year	Single	US	US R&B	US AC	CAN	CAN AC	UK	Album
1973	"Come Live with Me" b/w "Everybody Sing"	82	30	20	—	30	—	Come Live with Me
1974	"Louise" b/w "Somebody"	—	77	—	—	—	—	Come Live with Me
1975	"Living for the City" b/w "Then We'll Be Home"	91	22	—	—	—	—	Renaissance
1976	"America the Beautiful" b/w "Sunshine" (from Renaissance)	—	98	—	—	—	—	Non-album track
"—" denotes a recording that did not chart or was not released in that territory.

=== Columbia releases (all country music) ===
Listed below are songs Ray Charles released during his Columbia Records tenure which was spent on the country singles chart.

Year	Single	Peak positions		Album
Year	Single	US Country	CAN Country	Album
1983	"Born to Love Me"	20	25	Wish You Were Here Tonight
1983	"Ain't Your Memory Got No Pride at All"	82	—	Wish You Were Here Tonight
1983	"3/4 Time"	37	—	Wish You Were Here Tonight
1984	"We Didn't See a Thing" (with George Jones & Chet Atkins)	6	7	Friendship
1984	"Do I Ever Cross Your Mind"	50	—	Do I Ever Cross Your Mind
1984	"Rock and Roll Shoes" (with B.J. Thomas)	14	15	Friendship
1985	"Seven Spanish Angels" (with Willie Nelson)	1	1	Friendship
1985	"It Ain't Gonna Worry My Mind" (with Mickey Gilley)	12	31	Friendship
1985	"Two Old Cats Like Us" (with Hank Williams, Jr.)	14	18	Friendship
1986	"The Pages of My Mind"	34	54	From the Pages of My Mind
1986	"Dixie Moon"	66	—	From the Pages of My Mind
1987	"A Little Bit of Heaven"	76	—	From the Pages of My Mind
"—" denotes a recording that did not chart or was not released in that territory.

=== Other releases ===
Listed below are songs Ray Charles issued on various labels where the pop and R&B charts are concerned.

Year	Single	Peak positions							
Year	Single	US	US R&B	US AC	US Dance	CAN	CAN AC	UK	Japan
1986	"Baby Grand" (with Billy Joel)	75	—	3	—	—	—	—	—
1989	"Ellie My Love" (Southern All Stars cover)	—	40	—	—	—	—	—	3
1990	"I'll Be Good to You" (with Quincy Jones & Chaka Khan)	18	1	30	1	—	—	21	—
1993	"A Song for You"	104	57	9	—	35	12	23	—
1993	"Please (You Got That ...)" (with INXS)	—	—	—	9	—	—	50	—
2002	"Mother"	—	72	—	—	—	—	—	—
2005	"You Don't Know Me" (with Diana Krall)	—	38	21	—	—	—	—	—
2006	"Walkin' & Talkin'"	—	—	—	6	—	—	—	—
"—" denotes a recording that did not chart or was not released in that territory.

=== Billboard Year-end performances ===
Year	Song	Year-end position
1959	"What'd I Say"	50
1960	"Georgia on My Mind"	78
1961	"Hit the Road Jack"	19
1961	"One Mint Julep"	60
1962	"I Can't Stop Loving You"	2
1962	"You Don't Know Me"	54
1963	"Busted"	45
1963	"Take These Chains from My Heart"	81
1966	"Crying Time"	45
1967	"Here We Go Again"	80

== Video performances ==
- O Genio – Live in Brazil 1963 (Rhino) 1963 São Paulo performance
- The Dick Cavett Show – Ray Charles Collection (Shout! Factory Theatre) 1972 and 1973 TV appearances
- Soul of the Holy Land (Xenon) 1973 Israel tour
- Ray Charles Live – In Concert with the Edmonton Symphony (Eagle Rock) 1981 performance
- Ray Charles – 50 Years in Music (Image Entertainment) 1991 Pasadena, CA performance
- Live at Montreux, 1997 (Eagle Rock, Sunset Home Visual Entertainment)
- Ray Charles, Live at the Olympia, 2000 (XIII Bis) 2000 Paris performance
- Ray Charles in Concert (with special guest Diane Schuur) (Image Entertainment) 1999 Miami, FL 'Lighthouse for the Blind' benefit
- Ray Charles Celebrates a Gospel Christmas with Voices of Jubilation (Urban Works, Medialink Entertainment, LLC) 2002 Green Bay, WI performance
- The Legend Lives On (Immortal) video compilation of various performances
