= Yes Indeed! (Ray Charles album) =

Yes Indeed!!

Studio album by Ray Charles
- Released: October 1958
- Recorded: September 11, 1952 – February 20, 1958, in New York City and Atlanta
- Genre: Rhythm and blues
- Length: 36:02
- Label: Atlantic
- Producer: Ahmet Ertegün, Jerry Wexler

Ray Charles chronology
Soul Brothers (1958)	Yes Indeed!! (1958)	Ray Charles at Newport (1958)

Singles from Yes Indeed!
- 1. "The Sun's Gonna Shine Again" Released: January 1953; 2. "Blackjack" Released: September 1955; 3. "What Would I Do Without You" Released: May 1956; 4. "Lonely Avenue" Released: September 1956; 5. "It's All Right" Released: May 1957; 6. "Swanee River Rock" Released: September 1957; 7. "Talkin 'Bout You" Released: January 1958; 8. "Yes Indeed" Released: March 1958

alternative cover

Professional ratings
Review scores
Source	Rating
AllMusic	3/5 stars

Yes Indeed!! is the fourth album by Ray Charles, released in 1958 by Atlantic. It was the second of three Atlantic LPs that compiled Charles' hit singles for the label. (See discography)

Ray Charles, Yes Indeed!! is also the title of the book and DVD tribute published in memory of Charles by his manager Joe Adams, The Ray Charles Marketing Group and Genesis Publications in 2009.

== Track listing ==
All songs written by Ray Charles except as indicated.

Side One

1. "What Would I Do Without You?" – 2:32
2. "It's All Right" – 2:14
3. "I Want to Know" – 2:07
4. "Yes Indeed!!" (Sy Oliver) – 2:12
5. "Get On the Right Track Baby" (Titus Turner) – 2:19
6. "Talkin' 'bout You" – 2:48
7. "Swanee River Rock (Talkin' 'bout That River)" – 2:15

Side Two

1. "Lonely Avenue" (Doc Pomus) – 2:33
2. "Blackjack" – 2:17
3. "The Sun's Gonna Shine Again" (Sam Sweet) – 2:35
4. "I Had a Dream" – 2:51
5. "I Want a Little Girl" (Billy Moll, Murray Mencher) – 2:50
6. "Heartbreaker" (A. Nugetre) – 2:49
7. "Leave My Woman Alone" – 2:38

== Personnel ==
- Ray Charles - piano, vocals
- Joshua Willis - trumpet (track 1)
- Joe Bridgewater - trumpet (tracks 1, 6, 7, 9, 12)
- John Hunt - trumpet (tracks 2, 3, 5, 8, 14)
- Marcus Belgrave - trumpet (tracks 4, 11)
- Lee Harper - trumpet (tracks 4, 11)
- Ricky Harper - trumpet (tracks 6, 7, 12)
- Charles Whitley - trumpet (track 9)
- Jesse Drakes - trumpet (track 13)
- Don Wilkerson - tenor saxophone (tracks 1, 9)
- David Newman - tenor saxophone, alto saxophone (tracks 2, 3, 4, 5, 6, 7, 8, 11, 12, 14), baritone saxophone (track 9)
- Sam Taylor - tenor saxophone (track 13)
- Cecil Payne - baritone saxophone (track 1)
- Emmet Dennis - baritone saxophone (tracks 2, 3, 4, 5, 6, 7, 8, 11, 12, 14)
- Dave McRae - baritone saxophone (track 13)
- Wesley Jackson - guitar (track 9)
- Mickey Baker - guitar (track 13)
- Paul West - bass (track 1)
- Roosevelt Sheffield - bass (tracks 2, 3, 5, 8, 14)
- Edgar Willis - bass (tracks 4, 6, 7, 11, 12)
- Jimmy Bell - bass (track 9)
- Lloyd Trotman - bass (track 13)
- Panama Francis - drums (track 1)
- William Peeples - drums (tracks 2, 3, 5, 6, 7, 8, 12, 14)
- Richie Goldberg - drums (tracks 4, 11)
- Glenn Brooks - drums (track 9)
- Connie Kay - drums (track 13)
- The Cookies - vocals (tracks 3, 8, 14)
- The Raelettes - vocals (tracks 6, 7, 12)
- Mary Ann Fisher - vocals (tracks 6, 7, 12)

Technical

- Marvin Israel - cover design
