= My World (Ray Charles album) =

Studio album by Ray Charles
- Released: 1993
- Genres: Soul, contemporary R&B
- Length: 44:42
- Label: Warner Bros.
- Producer: Richard Perry

Ray Charles chronology
The Birth of Soul (1991)	My World (1993)	Strong Love Affair (1996)

My World is an album by the American musician Ray Charles, released in 1993. Charles incorporated elements of gospel, funk, and new jack swing.

The album peaked at No. 145 on the Billboard 200. "A Song for You" won a Grammy Award for "Best R&B Vocal Performance, Male".

== Production ==
The album was produced by Richard Perry. Charles covered Leon Russell's "A Song for You" and Paul Simon's "Still Crazy After All These Years". Mavis Staples duetted with Charles on "Love Has a Mind of Its Own". Billy Preston, Eric Clapton, Abe Laboriel, Brenda Russell, Jeff Porcaro, Paulinho Da Costa, Randy Waldman, Steve Gadd, and Vinnie Colaiuta contributed to My World.

== Critical reception ==
Professional ratings
Review scores
Source	Rating
AllMusic	2/5 stars
Chicago Tribune	3/4 stars
Robert Christgau	(dud)
The Encyclopedia of Popular Music	3/5 stars
Entertainment Weekly	B−
Rolling Stone	3/5 stars

Rolling Stone wrote: "Over the years, a benign, grandfatherly quality has crept into Charles's singing. In bringing this amused overview to 'Still Crazy', Charles turns the Simon gem into a jubilant, frisky declaration of independence by a proud eccentric." Ebony stated that Charles "continues to infuse his music with social messages, smooth productions and rhythmic funk."

The Chicago Tribune noted that "producer Richard Perry inexplicably insists on separating the Genius from his keyboards; that's a cardinal sin." Newsday called the album "surprisingly potent, awash in rhythms and production techniques not even imagined when Ray first entered a studio." The Baltimore Sun concluded that "what Brother Ray needs first and foremost are songs, and when you hear how much he makes of a classic, Paul Simon's 'Still Crazy After All These Years', it suddenly becomes obvious how cut-rate the rest of the writing here is."

AllMusic wrote that the album "marked an attempt to somewhat 'modernize' Ray Charles by incorporating elements of hip-hop and New Jack swing into his trademark sound."

== Track listing ==
No.	Title	Length
1.	"My World"	4:01
2.	"A Song for You"	4:12
3.	"None of Us Are Free"	4:59
4.	"So Help Me God"	3:59
5.	"Let Me Take Over"	5:25
6.	"One Drop of Love"	4:22
7.	"If I Could"	4:52
8.	"Love Has a Mind of Its Own"	4:06
9.	"I'll Be There"	3:48
10.	"Still Crazy After All These Years"	4:58
