= Ray Charles =

American singer, songwriter and pianist (1930–2004)

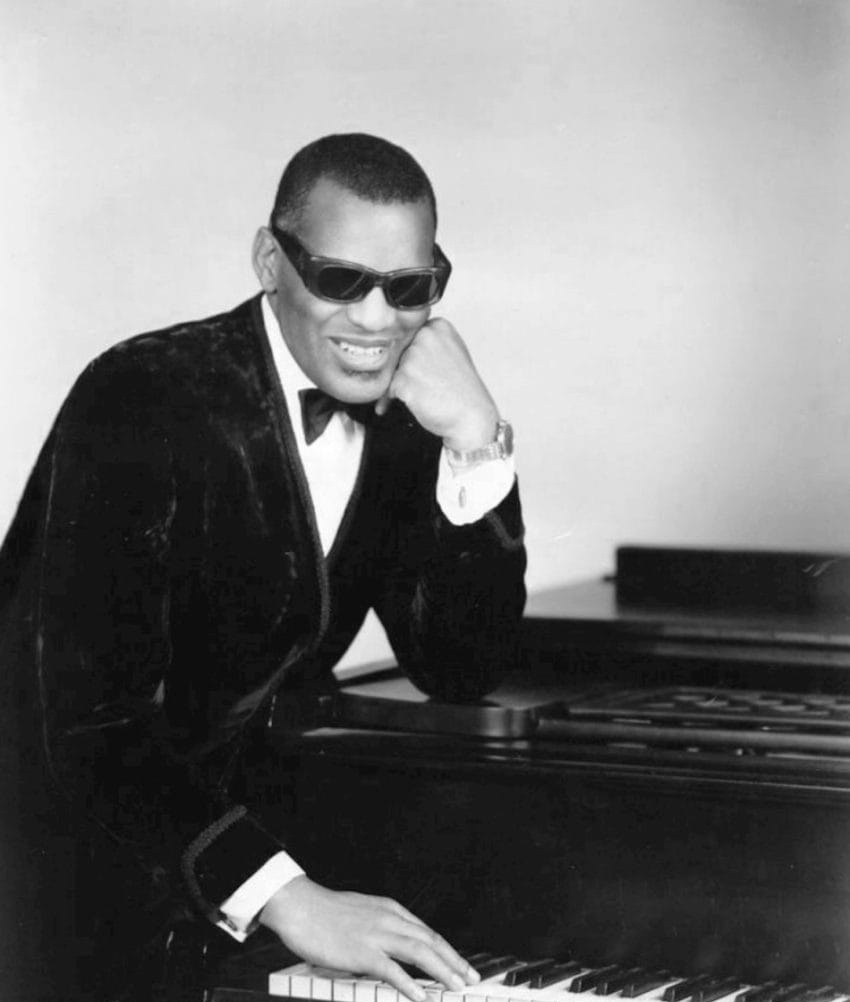
- Charles in 1969
- Born: Ray Charles Robinson (Note: According to Blues: A Regional Experience, based on the authors' interpretation of 1935 Florida census information, he was born Horace Charles Robinson in Greenville, Florida. However, most other reliable sources give his birth name as Ray Charles Robinson, and his birthplace as Dougherty County, Georgia. It has been suggested that there has been a misinterpretation and that Horace Charles Robinson was in fact a half-brother.); September 23, 1930; Albany, Georgia, U.S.
- Died: June 10, 2004 (aged 73); Los Angeles, California, U.S.
- Resting place: Inglewood Park Cemetery
- Occupations: Singer; musician; songwriter; composer
- Years active: 1945–2004
- Spouses: Eileen Williams (m. 1951; div. 1952); Della Howard (m. 1955; div. 1977)
- Children: 12
- Musical career
- Origin: Greenville, Florida, U.S.
- Genres: R&B; soul; blues; gospel; country; jazz; rock and roll
- Instruments: Vocals; piano
- Works: Discography
- Labels: Atlantic; ABC; Tangerine/Crossover; Warner Bros.; Swing Time; Concord; Columbia; Flashback; His Master's Voice (UK)
- Formerly of: The Raelettes; USA for Africa
- Website: raycharles.com

Ray Charles Robinson (September 23, 1930 – June 10, 2004) was an American singer, songwriter, and pianist. He is regarded as one of the most influential musicians of the 20th century and was often referred to by contemporaries as "The Genius". Among friends and fellow musicians, Charles preferred being called "Brother Ray". He lost his vision as a child, possibly due to glaucoma, and consequently wore dark glasses.

Charles pioneered the soul music genre during the 1950s by combining elements of blues, jazz, rhythm and blues, and gospel into his music during his time with Atlantic Records. He contributed to the integration of country music, rhythm and blues, and pop music during the 1960s with his crossover success on ABC Records, notably with his two Modern Sounds albums. With ABC, Charles became one of the first black musicians to be granted artistic control by a mainstream record company.

Charles's 1960s hit "Georgia on My Mind" was the first of his three career No. 1 hits on the Billboard Hot 100. His 1962 album Modern Sounds in Country and Western Music became his first album to top the Billboard 200. Charles had multiple singles reach the Top 40 on various Billboard charts: 61 on the US R&B singles chart, 33 on the Hot 100 singles chart, and eight on the Hot Country singles charts.

Charles cited Nat King Cole as a primary influence, but was also influenced by Art Tatum, Louis Jordan and Charles Brown. He had a lifelong friendship and occasional partnership with Quincy Jones. Frank Sinatra called Charles "the only true genius in show business", although Charles downplayed this notion. Billy Joel said, "This may sound like sacrilege, but I think Ray Charles was more important than Elvis Presley."

For his musical contributions, Charles received the Kennedy Center Honors, the National Medal of Arts, and the Polar Music Prize. He was one of the inaugural inductees at the Rock and Roll Hall of Fame in 1986. Charles has won 17 Grammy Awards (five posthumously), the Grammy Lifetime Achievement Award in 1987, and 10 of his recordings have been inducted into the Grammy Hall of Fame. Rolling Stone ranked Charles No. 10 on their list of the "100 Greatest Artists of All Time", and No. 2 on their list of the "100 Greatest Singers of All Time". In 2023, in its revised list for the "200 Greatest Singers of All Time", Charles was replaced at the No. 2 position by Whitney Houston while taking the sixth spot. In 2022, he was inducted into the Country Music Hall of Fame, as well as the Black Music & Entertainment Walk of Fame.

== Early life and education ==
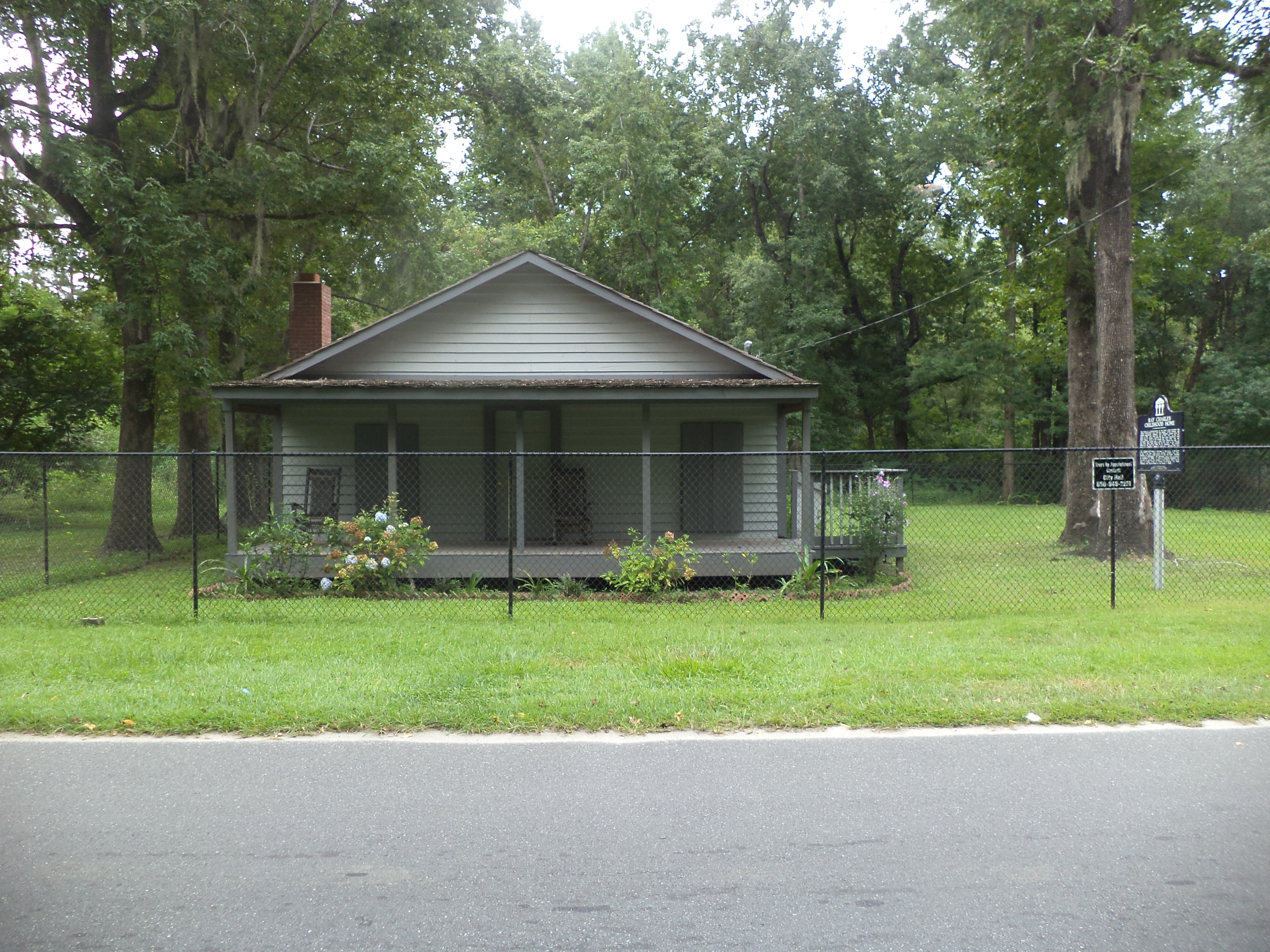
Charles's childhood home in Greenville, Florida

Ray Charles Robinson was born on September 23, 1930, in Albany, Georgia. He was the son of Bailey Robinson, a laborer, and Aretha (or Reatha) Robinson (née Williams), a laundress, of Greenville, Florida. During Aretha's childhood, her mother died and her father could not keep her. Bailey, a man her father worked with, took her in. The Robinson family—Bailey, his wife Mary Jane, and his mother—informally adopted her, and Aretha took the surname Robinson. A few years later, Aretha became pregnant by Bailey. During the ensuing scandal, she left Greenville late in the summer of 1930 to be with family back in Albany. After Charles's birth, she and the infant returned to Greenville. Aretha and Bailey's wife, who had lost a son, then shared in Charles's upbringing. The father had left Greenville and married another woman elsewhere. By his first birthday, Charles had a brother, George.

In his early years, Charles showed an interest in mechanical objects and often watched his neighbors working on their cars and farm machinery. Charles's musical curiosity was sparked at Wylie Pitman's Red Wing Cafe, at age three, when Pitman played boogie woogie on an old upright piano; Pitman subsequently taught Charles how to play the piano. Charles and his mother were always welcome at the Red Wing Cafe and even lived there when they were in financial distress. Pitman also cared for Ray's younger brother George, to take some of the burden off their mother. George accidentally drowned in his mother's laundry tub at age four.

Charles started to lose his sight at age four or five, and was blind by age seven, likely as a result of glaucoma. Because of his blindness, Charles donned his famous sunglasses. Destitute, uneducated, and mourning the loss of her younger son, Aretha Robinson used her connections in the local community to find a school that would accept a blind African-American pupil. Despite his initial protest, Charles attended school at the Florida School for the Deaf and the Blind in St. Augustine from 1937 to 1945 and learned to play a variety of instruments, including the piano, alto saxophone, clarinet, trumpet, and organ. He focused primarily on the piano.

Charles further developed his musical talent at school, taking classical piano lessons and learning the music of composers such as Bach, Mozart, Beethoven, Chopin, and Sibelius. Charles's music teacher, Mrs. Lawrence, taught him to read and write music using Braille, a difficult process that requires learning the left hand movements by reading braille with the right hand and learning the right hand movements by reading braille with the left hand, then combining the two parts.

Charles's mother died in the spring of 1945, when he was 14. Her death came as a shock to Charles, and he later said the deaths of his brother and mother were "the two great tragedies" of his life. Charles decided not to return to school after the funeral.

== Career ==
=== 1945–1952: Florida, Los Angeles, and Seattle ===
After leaving school, Charles moved to Jacksonville to live with Charles Wayne Powell, who had been friends with his late mother. He played the piano for bands at the Ritz Theatre in LaVilla for over a year, earning $4 a night (US$48, in 2025 value). He joined Local 632 of the American Federation of Musicians, in the hope that it would help him get work, and was able to use the union hall's piano to practice, since he did not have one at home; he learned piano licks from copying the other players there. He started to build a reputation as a talented musician in Jacksonville, but the jobs did not come fast enough for him to construct a strong identity, so, at age 16, he moved to Orlando, where he lived in borderline poverty and went without food for days. Charles eventually started to write arrangements for a pop music band, and in the summer of 1947, he unsuccessfully auditioned to play piano for Lucky Millinder and his sixteen-piece band.

In 1947, Charles moved to Tampa, where he held two jobs, including one as a pianist for Charles Brantley's Honey Dippers. In his early career, Charles modeled himself on Nat King Cole. His first four recordings—"Wondering and Wondering", "Walking and Talking", "Why Did You Go?" and "I Found My Baby There"—were allegedly done in Tampa, although some discographies claim he recorded them in Miami in 1951 or else Los Angeles in 1952.

Charles had always played piano for other people, but he was keen to have his own band. He decided to leave Florida for a large city, and, considering Chicago and New York City too big, followed his friend Gosady "Garcia" McGee to Seattle, Washington, in March 1948, knowing that the biggest radio hits came from northern cities. There, under the tutelage of record producer Robert Blackwell, he met and befriended the 15-year-old Quincy Jones.

With Charles on piano, McKee on guitar, and Milton Garred on bass, The McSon Trio (named for McKee and Robinson) started playing the 1–5 A.M. shift at the Rocking Chair. Publicity photos of this trio are some of the earliest known photographs of Charles. In April 1949, he and his band recorded "Confession Blues", which became his first national hit, soaring to the second spot on the Billboard R&B chart. While still working at the Rocking Chair, Charles also arranged songs for other artists, including Cole Porter's "Ghost of a Chance" and Dizzy Gillespie's "Emanon". After the success of his first two singles, Charles moved to Los Angeles in 1950 and spent the next few years touring with the blues musician Lowell Fulson as Fulson's musical director.

In 1950, Charles's performance in a Miami hotel impressed record executive and producer Henry Stone, who went on to record a Ray Charles Rockin' record, which did not achieve popularity. During his stay in Miami, Charles was required to stay in the segregated but thriving black community of Overtown. Stone later helped Jerry Wexler find Charles in St. Petersburg.

After signing with Swing Time Records, Charles recorded two more R&B hits under the name Ray Charles: "Baby, Let Me Hold Your Hand" (1951), which reached No. 5, and "Kissa Me Baby" (1952), which reached No. 8. Swing Time folded the following year, and Ahmet Ertegun, founder of Atlantic, signed Charles.

In addition to being a musician, Charles was also a record producer, producing Guitar Slim's No. 1 hit, "The Things That I Used to Do".

=== 1952–1959: Atlantic Records ===
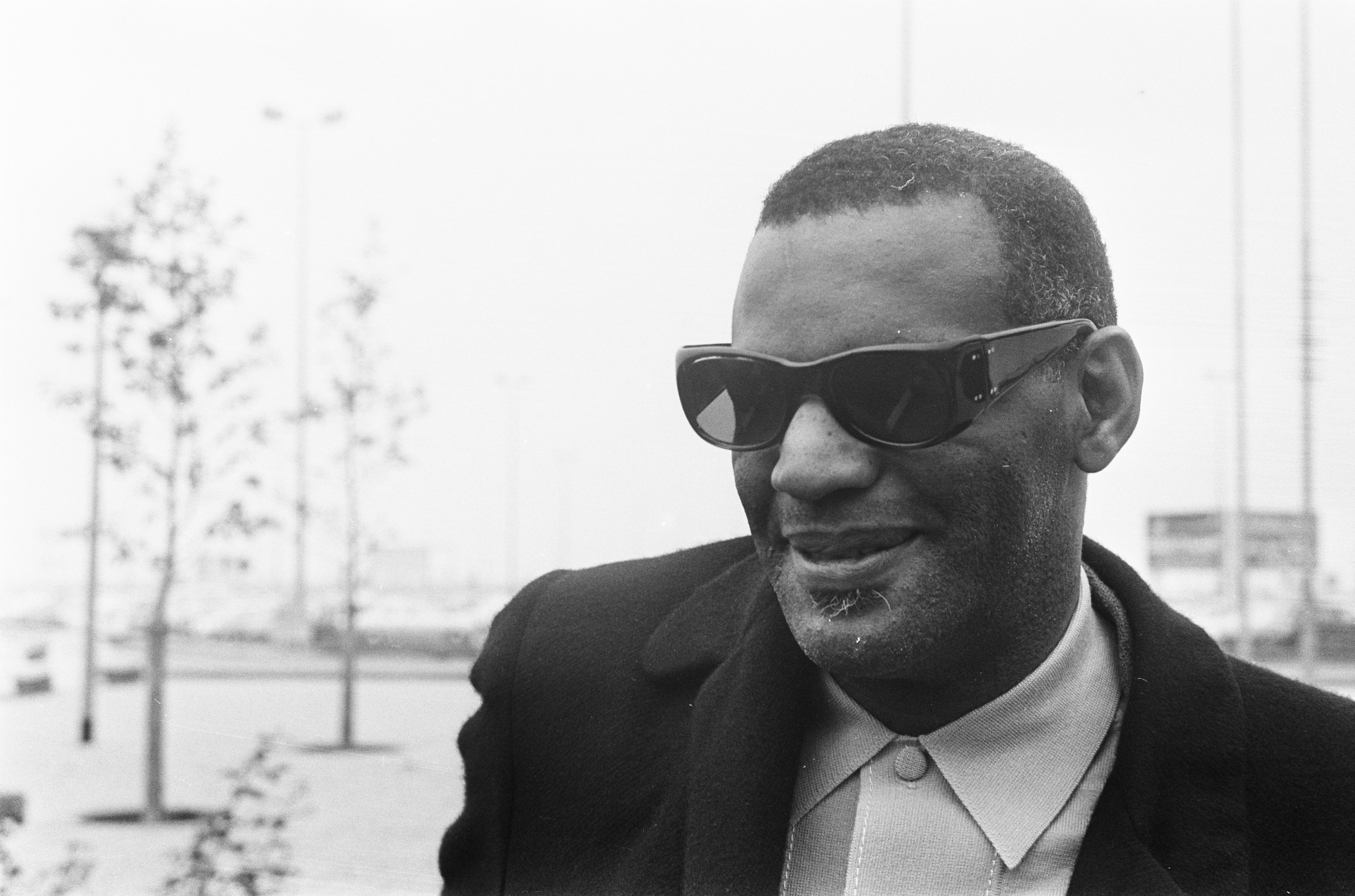
Charles in 1968

In June 1952, Atlantic bought Charles's contract for $2,500 (US$30,310 in 2025 dollars). His first recording session for Atlantic ("The Midnight Hour"/"Roll with My Baby") took place in September 1952, although Charles's last Swing Time release ("Misery in My Heart"/"The Snow Is Falling") would not appear until February 1953.

In 1953, "Mess Around" became Charles's first small hit for Atlantic; during the next year, he had hits with "It Should've Been Me" and "Don't You Know". He also recorded the songs "Midnight Hour" and "Sinner's Prayer" around this time.

Late in 1954, Charles recorded "I've Got a Woman". The lyrics were written by bandleader Renald Richard, but Charles claimed the composition. They later admitted that the song went back to the Southern Tones' "It Must Be Jesus" (1954). It became one of his most notable hits, reaching No. 2 on the R&B chart. "I've Got a Woman" combined gospel, jazz, and blues elements. In 1955, he had hits with "This Little Girl of Mine" and "A Fool for You". In upcoming years, hits included "Drown in My Own Tears" and "Hallelujah I Love Her So".

Charles also recorded jazz, such as The Great Ray Charles (1957). He worked with vibraphonist Milt Jackson, releasing Soul Brothers in 1958 and Soul Meeting in 1961. By 1958, Charles was not only headlining major black venues such as the Apollo Theater in New York, but also larger venues such as Carnegie Hall and the Newport Jazz Festival, where his first live album was recorded in 1958. Charles hired a female singing group, the Cookies, and renamed them the Raelettes. In 1958, Charles and the Raelettes performed for the famed Cavalcade of Jazz concert produced by Leon Hefflin Sr. held at the Shrine Auditorium on August 3. The other headliners were Little Willie John, Sam Cooke, Ernie Freeman, and Bo Rhambo. Sammy Davis Jr. was also there to crown the winner of the Miss Cavalcade of Jazz beauty contest. The event featured the top four prominent disc jockeys of Los Angeles.

Charles reached the pinnacle of his success at Atlantic with the release of "What'd I Say", which combined gospel, jazz, blues and Latin music. Charles said that he wrote it spontaneously while he was performing in clubs with his band. Despite some radio stations banning the song because of its sexually suggestive lyrics, the song became Charles's first top-10 pop record. It reached No. 6 on the Billboard Pop chart and No. 1 on the Billboard R&B chart in 1959. Later that year, he released his first country song (a cover of Hank Snow's "I'm Movin' On") and recorded three more albums for the label: a jazz record (The Genius After Hours, 1961); a blues record (The Genius Sings the Blues, 1961); and a big band record (The Genius of Ray Charles, 1959) which was his first Top 40 album, peaking at No. 17.

=== 1959–1967: Crossover success ===
Charles moved from Atlantic Records to ABC when ABC offered a contract Atlantic could not match; Charles later offered the details: "ABC took me from Atlantic and gave me a contract that was unheard of in those days. I made 75 cents on every dollar. It was ridiculous. Nobody ever heard of a deal like that. Never! Never! That's what [ABC] did in order to get me to leave Atlantic. I didn't want to leave. Checking it out with [founders] Jerry Wexler or Ahmet Ertegun. They will tell you. I took the contract and showed it to them and said, 'I don't want to leave you guys, so if you can match this—you don't have to beat it, just match it—I'll stay here'. And they said, 'Ray, if these people are sincere, if they're legitimate, then you go with them, because there is no way for us to match it. There is no way we can give any artist 75 cents of every dollar; we just can't do it'. And Atlantic Records and Ray Charles remain friends until this day. I can call Ahmet up right now and ask him for anything and I'll get it, because we left on good terms. There was no bad vibes or bad feelings".

ABC offered him a $50,000 (US$552,226 in 2025 dollars) annual advance, higher royalties than before, and eventual ownership of his master tapes—a very valuable and lucrative deal at the time. During his Atlantic years, Charles had been hailed for his inventive compositions, but by the time of the release of the largely instrumental jazz album Genius + Soul = Jazz (1960) for ABC's subsidiary label Impulse!, he had given up on writing in favor of becoming a cover artist, giving his own eclectic arrangements of existing songs.

With "Georgia on My Mind", his first hit single for ABC-Paramount in 1960, Charles received national acclaim and four Grammy Awards, including two for "Georgia on My Mind" (Best Vocal Performance Single Record or Track, Male, and Best Performance by a Pop Single Artist). Written by Stuart Gorrell and Hoagy Carmichael in 1930, the song was Charles's first work with Sid Feller, who produced, arranged and conducted the recording. Charles's rendition of the tune helped elevate it to the status of an American classic, and his version also became the state song of Georgia in 1979.

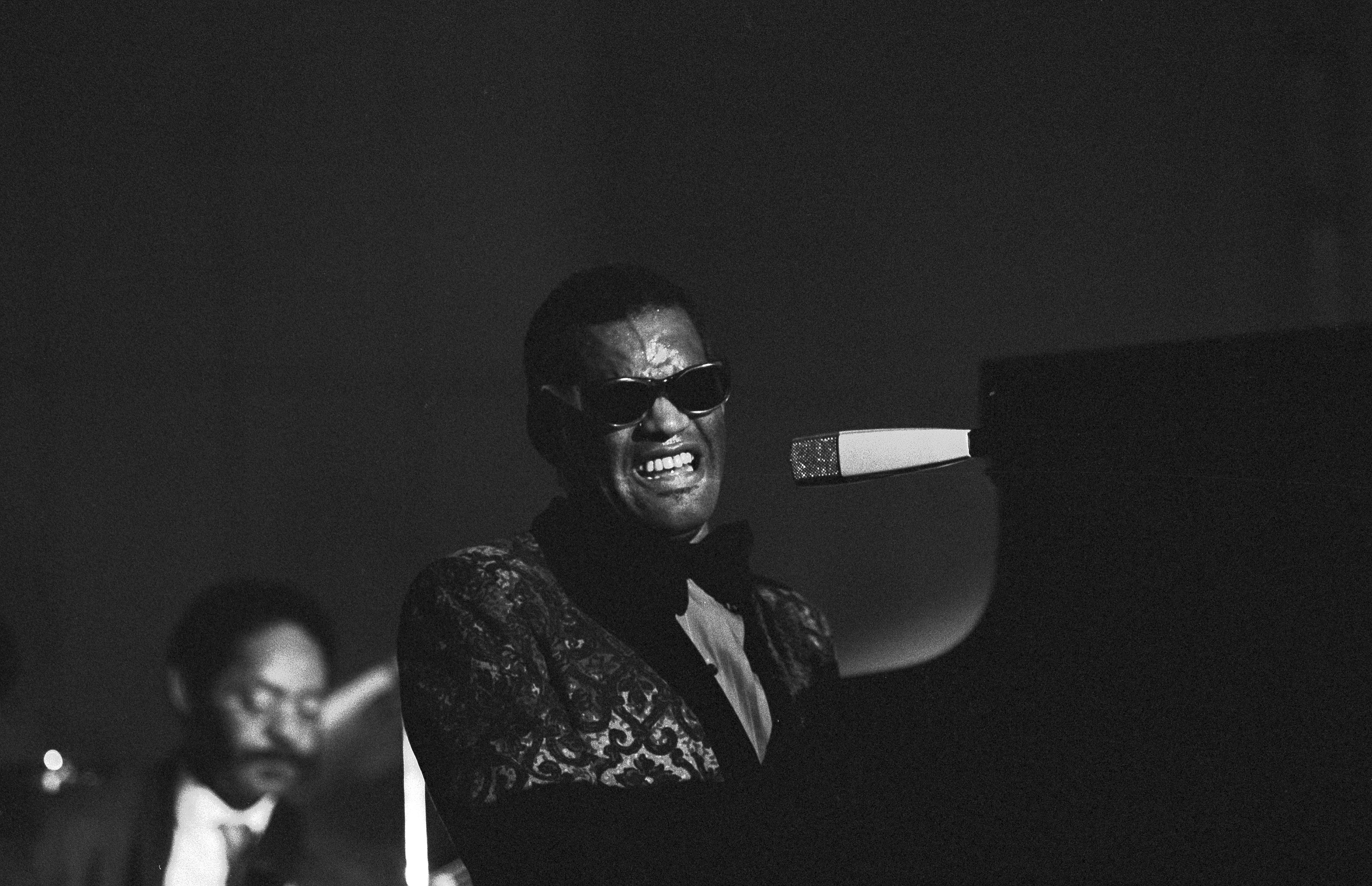
Charles in 1971

Charles earned another Grammy for the follow-up track "Hit the Road Jack", written by R&B singer Percy Mayfield.

In 1961, Charles had expanded his small road ensemble to a big band, partly as a response to increasing royalties and touring fees, becoming one of the few black artists to cross over into mainstream pop with such a level of creative control. Concerts in Antibes and later Zurich, Lyon and Paris led to Charles becoming the No. 1 bestselling jazz artist in France for many years. This success, however, came to a momentary halt during a concert tour in November 1961, when a police search of Charles's hotel room in Indianapolis, Indiana, led to the discovery of heroin in the medicine cabinet. The case was eventually dropped, as the search lacked a proper warrant by the police, and Charles soon returned to music.

In the early 1960s, on the way from Louisiana to Oklahoma City, Charles faced a near-death experience when the pilot of his plane lost visibility, as snow and his failure to use the defroster caused the windshield of the plane to become completely covered in ice. The pilot made a few circles in the air before he was finally able to see through a small part of the windshield and land the plane. Charles placed a spiritual interpretation on the experience, claiming that "something or someone which instruments cannot detect" was responsible for creating the small opening in the ice on the windshield which enabled the pilot to eventually land the plane safely.

The 1962 album Modern Sounds in Country and Western Music and its sequel, Modern Sounds in Country and Western Music, Vol. 2, helped to bring country music into the musical mainstream. Charles's version of the Don Gibson song "I Can't Stop Loving You" topped the Pop chart for five weeks, stayed at No. 1 on the R&B chart for ten weeks, and gave him his only No. 1 record in the UK. In 1962, he founded his record label, Tangerine, which ABC-Paramount promoted and distributed. Charles had major pop hits in 1963 with "Busted" (US No. 4) and "Take These Chains from My Heart" (US No. 8). In 1964, Margie Hendrix was kicked out of the Raelettes after a big argument.

In 1964, Charles's career was halted once more after he was arrested for a third time for possession of heroin. He agreed to go to a rehabilitative facility to avoid jail time and eventually kicked his habit at a clinic in Los Angeles. After spending a year on parole, Charles reappeared in the charts in 1966 with a series of hits composed with Ashford & Simpson and Jo Armstead, including the dance number "I Don't Need No Doctor" and "Let's Go Get Stoned", which became his first No. 1 R&B hit in several years. His cover version of "Crying Time", originally recorded by country singer Buck Owens, reached No. 6 on the pop chart and helped Charles win a Grammy Award the following March. In 1967, he had a top-20 hit with another ballad, "Here We Go Again".

=== 1967–1983: Commercial decline ===
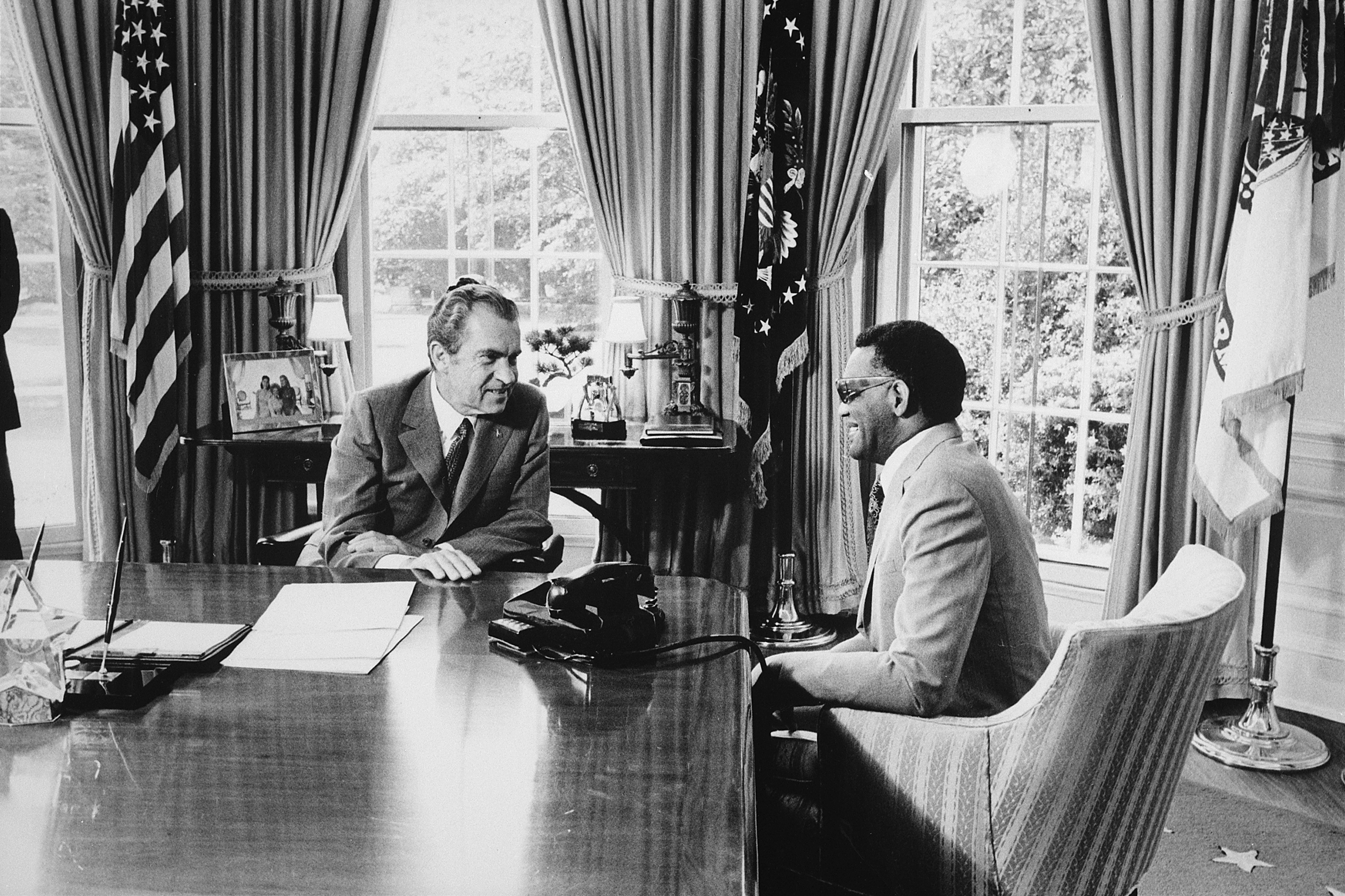
Charles meeting with President Richard Nixon, 1972 (photo by Oliver F. Atkins)

Charles's renewed chart success proved to be short lived, and by the 1970s, his music was rarely played on radio stations. The rise of psychedelic rock and harder forms of rock and R&B music had reduced Charles's radio appeal, as did his choosing to record pop standards and covers of contemporary rock and soul hits, since his earnings from owning his master tapes had taken away the motivation to write new material. Charles nonetheless continued to have an active recording career. Most of his recordings between 1968 and 1973 evoked strong reactions: either adored or panned by fans and critics alike. His recordings during this period, especially 1972's A Message from the People, moved toward the progressive soul sound popular at the time. A Message from the People included his unique gospel-influenced version of "America the Beautiful" and a number of protest songs about poverty and civil rights. Charles was often criticized for his version of "America the Beautiful" because it was very drastically changed from the song's original version. On July 14, 1973, Margie Hendrix, the mother of Ray's son Charles Wayne Hendrix, died at 38 years of age, which led to Ray having to care for the child. The official cause of her death is unknown.

In 1974, Charles left ABC Records and recorded several albums on his own label, Crossover Records. A 1975 recording of Stevie Wonder's hit "Living for the City" later helped Charles win another Grammy. In 1977, he reunited with Ahmet Ertegun and re-signed to Atlantic Records, for which he recorded the album True to Life, remaining with his old label until 1980. However, the label had now begun to focus on rock acts, and some of their prominent soul artists, such as Aretha Franklin, were starting to be neglected. In November 1977, Charles appeared as the host of the NBC television show Saturday Night Live.

In April 1979, his version of "Georgia on My Mind" was proclaimed the state song of Georgia, and an emotional Charles performed the song on the floor of the state legislature. In 1980, Charles performed in the musical film The Blues Brothers. Although he had notably supported the civil rights movement and Martin Luther King Jr. during the 1960s, Charles was criticized for performing at the Sun City resort in South Africa in 1981 during an international boycott protesting that country's apartheid policy. Charles later defended his choice of performing there, insisting that the audience of black and white fans would integrate while he was there.

=== 1983–2004: Later years ===
In 1983, Charles signed a contract with Columbia. He recorded a string of country albums and had hit singles in duets with singers such as George Jones, Chet Atkins, B. J. Thomas, Mickey Gilley, Hank Williams Jr., Dee Dee Bridgewater ("Precious Thing") and his longtime friend Willie Nelson, with whom Charles recorded "Seven Spanish Angels". In 1985, Charles participated in the musical recording and video "We Are the World", a charity single recorded by the supergroup United Support of Artists (USA) for Africa. Five years later, Charles participated for the first time in the Sanremo Music Festival with song "Good Love Gone Bad", written by Toto Cutugno.

Before the release of his first album for Warner, Would You Believe, Charles made a return to the R&B charts with a cover of the Brothers Johnson's "I'll Be Good to You", a duet with his lifelong friend Quincy Jones and the singer Chaka Khan, which hit No. 1 on the R&B chart in 1990 and won Charles and Khan a Grammy for their duet. Prior to this, Charles returned to the pop charts with "Baby Grand", a duet with singer-songwriter Billy Joel. In 1989, he recorded a cover of the Southern All Stars' "Itoshi no Ellie" for a Japanese TV advertisement for the Suntory brand, releasing it in Japan as "Ellie My Love", where it reached No. 3 on its Oricon chart. In the same year he was a special guest at the Verona Arena during the tour promoting Oro Incenso & Birra of the Italian singer Zucchero Fornaciari.

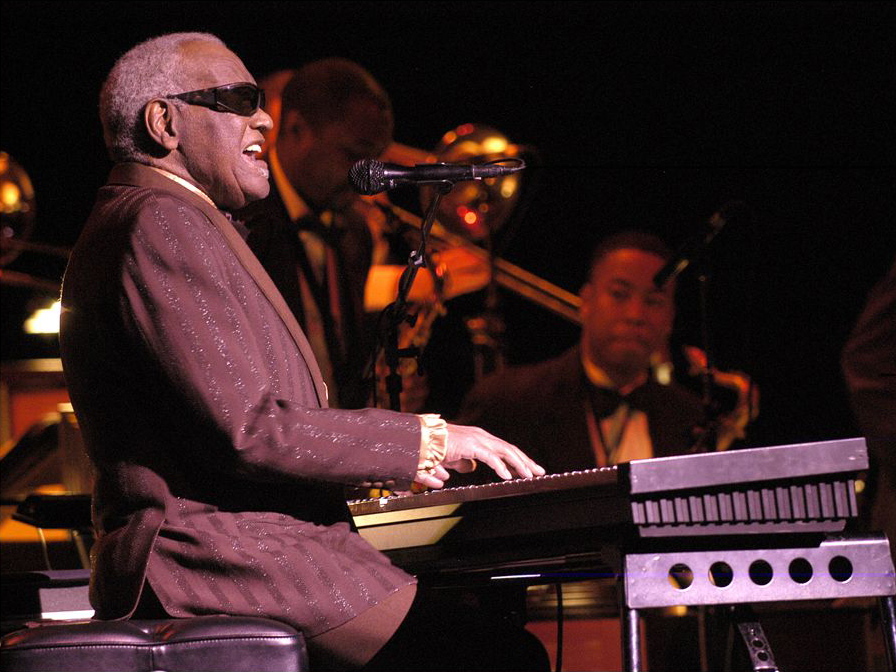
Charles at the 2003 Montreal International Jazz Festival, one of his last public performances

In 2001–02, Charles appeared in commercials for the New Jersey Lottery to promote its campaign "For every dream, there's a jackpot." In 2003, he headlined the White House Correspondents' Association Dinner in Washington, D.C., attended by President George W. Bush, Laura Bush, Colin Powell and Condoleezza Rice. Also in 2003, Charles presented Van Morrison with Morrison's award upon being inducted in the Songwriters Hall of Fame, and the two sang Morrison's song "Crazy Love" (the performance appears on Morrison's 2007 album The Best of Van Morrison Volume 3). In 2003, Charles performed "Georgia on My Mind" and "America the Beautiful" at a televised annual banquet of electronic media journalists held in Washington, D.C. His final public appearance was on April 30, 2004, at the dedication of his music studio as a historic landmark in Los Angeles.

== Legacy ==
=== Influence on music industry ===
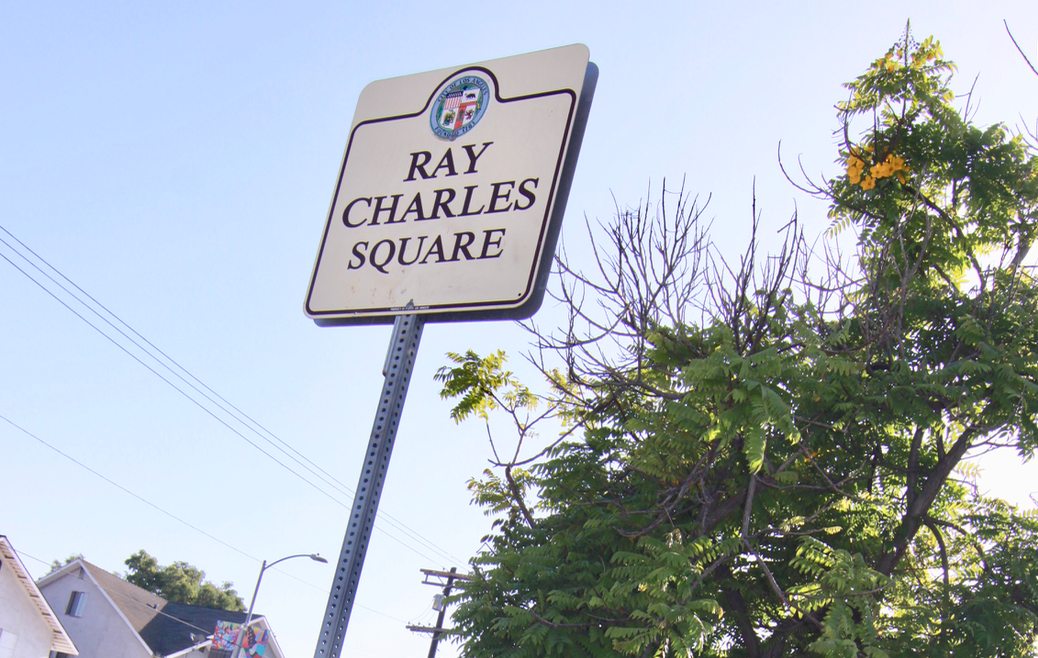
The sign for Ray Charles Square in West Adams Heights, Los Angeles

Charles possessed one of the most recognizable voices in American music. In the words of musicologist Henry Pleasants:

Sinatra, and Bing Crosby before him, had been masters of words. Ray Charles is a master of sounds. His records disclose an extraordinary assortment of slurs, glides, turns, shrieks, wails, breaks, shouts, screams and hollers, all wonderfully controlled, disciplined by inspired musicianship, and harnessed to ingenious subtleties of harmony, dynamics and rhythm... It is either the singing of a man whose vocabulary is inadequate to express what is in his heart and mind or of one whose feelings are too intense for satisfactory verbal or conventionally melodic articulation. He can't tell it to you. He can't even sing it to you. He has to cry out to you, or shout to you, in tones eloquent of despair—or exaltation. The voice alone, with little assistance from the text or the notated music, conveys the message.

Pleasants continues, "Ray Charles is usually described as a baritone, and his speaking voice would suggest as much, as would the difficulty he experiences in reaching and sustaining the baritone's high E and F in a popular ballad. But the voice undergoes some sort of transfiguration under stress, and in music of gospel or blues character he can and does sing for measures on end in the high tenor range of A, B flat, B, C and even C sharp and D, sometimes in full voice, sometimes in an ecstatic head voice, sometimes in falsetto. In falsetto he continues up to E and F above high C. On one extraordinary record, 'I'm Going Down to the River'...he hits an incredible B flat...giving him an overall range, including the falsetto extension, of at least three octaves."

Charles's style and success in the genres of rhythm and blues and jazz had an influence on a number of highly successful artists, including, as Jon Pareles has noted, Elvis Presley, Aretha Franklin, Stevie Wonder, Van Morrison, and Billy Joel. Other singers who have acknowledged Charles's influence on their own styles include James Booker, Steve Winwood, Richard Manuel, and Gregg Allman. According to Joe Levy, a music editor for Rolling Stone, "The hit records he made for Atlantic in the mid-1950s mapped out everything that would happen to rock 'n' roll and soul music in the years that followed." Charles was also an inspiration to Pink Floyd member Roger Waters, who told the Turkish newspaper Hürriyet: "I was about 15. In the middle of the night with friends, we were listening to jazz. It was "Georgia on My Mind", Ray Charles's version. Then I thought 'One day, if I make some people feel only one-twentieth of what I am feeling now, it will be quite enough for me.'"

Ray, a biopic portraying his life and career between the mid-1930s and 1979, was released in October 2004, starring Jamie Foxx as Charles. Foxx won the 2005 Academy Award for Best Actor for the role.

=== Awards and honors ===
Year	Award/Honor	Category/Recognition	Notable Works or Details
1960	Grammy Award	Best Rhythm & Blues Performance	Song: "Let the Good Times Roll"
1960	Grammy Award	Best Male Vocal Performance, Pop	Song: "Georgia on My Mind"
1960	Grammy Award	Best Performance by a Pop Single Artist	Song: "Georgia on My Mind"
1961	Grammy Award	Best Male Vocal Performance, R&B	Song: "Hit the Road Jack"
1961	Playboy Award	Best Male Vocalist, Jazz and Pop	Recognition from Playboy magazine
1962	Grammy Award	Best Male Solo Vocal Performance	Song: "I Can't Stop Loving You"
1962	Grammy Award	Best Rhythm & Blues Recording	Song: "I Can't Stop Loving You"
1962	Grammy Award	Best Male Pop Vocal Performance	Song: "I Can't Stop Loving You"
1963	Grammy Award	Best Rhythm & Blues Recording	Song: "Busted"
1963	Grammy Award	Best Vocal Performance, Male	Song: "Busted"
1965	Playboy Award	Best Male Vocalist, Jazz	Recognition from Playboy magazine
1967	Grammy Award	Best R&B Solo Vocal Performance, Male or Female	Song: "Crying Time"
1971	Playboy Award	Best Pop and R&B Vocalist	Recognition from Playboy magazine
1975	Academy of Achievement's Golden Plate Award	For distinguished career in music	Celebrated for career achievements
1981	Hollywood Walk of Fame	Star on Walk of Fame	Recognized for his contributions to entertainment
1986	Rock and Roll Hall of Fame	Inductee (Inaugural Class)	One of the first musicians inducted
1986	Medal of Commander	The Order of Arts and Letters	Commander of Fine Arts and Letters
1986	Kennedy Center Honors	Lifetime Achievement in Arts	Celebrated as a cultural icon and pioneer in music
1987	President's Merit Award	Recognition by the Recording Academy	Honored for contributions to music
1987	Grammy Lifetime Achievement Award	Lifetime Achievement	Celebrated for career achievements
1990	Honorary Doctorate – University of South Florida	Doctor of Fine Arts	Recognized for his influence on arts and culture
1991	Grammy Award	Best R&B Vocal Performance by a Duo or Group	Song: "I'll Be Good to You" (w/Quincy Jones feat. Chaka Khan)
1991	Rhythm & Blues Foundation Pioneer Award	Inductee	Recognized for contributions to R&B music
1991	George and Ira Gershwin Award	Lifetime Musical Achievement Award at UCLA Spring Sing	Honored for his lasting musical legacy
1993	National Medal of Arts	Presented by President Bill Clinton	Highest U.S. award for artistic achievement
1998	Polar Music Prize	Awarded with Ravi Shankar	Sweden's most prestigious award, presented by the King & Queen
2001	Candle Award from Morehouse College	Lifetime Achievement in Arts and Entertainment	Recognized for his contributions to arts and education
2001	Honorary Doctorate – Morehouse College	Doctor of Humane Letters	$2 million donation to fund music education
2003	Honorary Doctorate – Dillard University	Doctor of Humane Letters	Endowed a professorship in African-American culinary history
2004	Grammy Award	Best Gospel Performance	Song: "Heaven Help Us All" (with Gladys Knight)
2004	Grammy Award	Best Instrumental Arrangement Accompanying Vocalists	Song: "Here We Go Again" (with Norah Jones)
2004	Grammy Award	Record of the Year	Song: "Here We Go Again" (with Norah Jones)
2004	Grammy Award	Album of the Year	Album: Genius Loves Company
2004	Grammy Award	Best Pop Vocal Album	Album: Genius Loves Company
2004	National Black Sports & Entertainment Hall of Fame	Inductee	Honored for achievements in entertainment
2005	Grammy Awards Dedication	Grammy Awards dedicated to Charles	Tribute after his passing
2010	Ray Charles Performing Arts Center	Facility named at Morehouse College	$20 million facility established for arts education
2013	USPS Forever Stamp	Part of the Musical Icons series	Recognized as an American music icon
2013	Rolling Stone	No. 10 on "100 Greatest Artists of All Time"	Recognized among music legends
2013	Rolling Stone	No. 2 on "100 Greatest Singers of All Time"	Praised for vocal prowess and influence
2015	Rhythm and Blues Music Hall of Fame	Inductee	Honored for his influence on R&B music
2016	"A Tribute to Ray Charles: In Performance at the White House"	Statement on "America the Beautiful" and performance by Usher "Georgia on My Mind"	A Smithsonian Salute broadcast on PBS. Barack Obama praised his rendition as deeply patriotic
2022	Country Music Hall of Fame	Inductee (Posthumous)	Third African-American inducted, honored for country influence

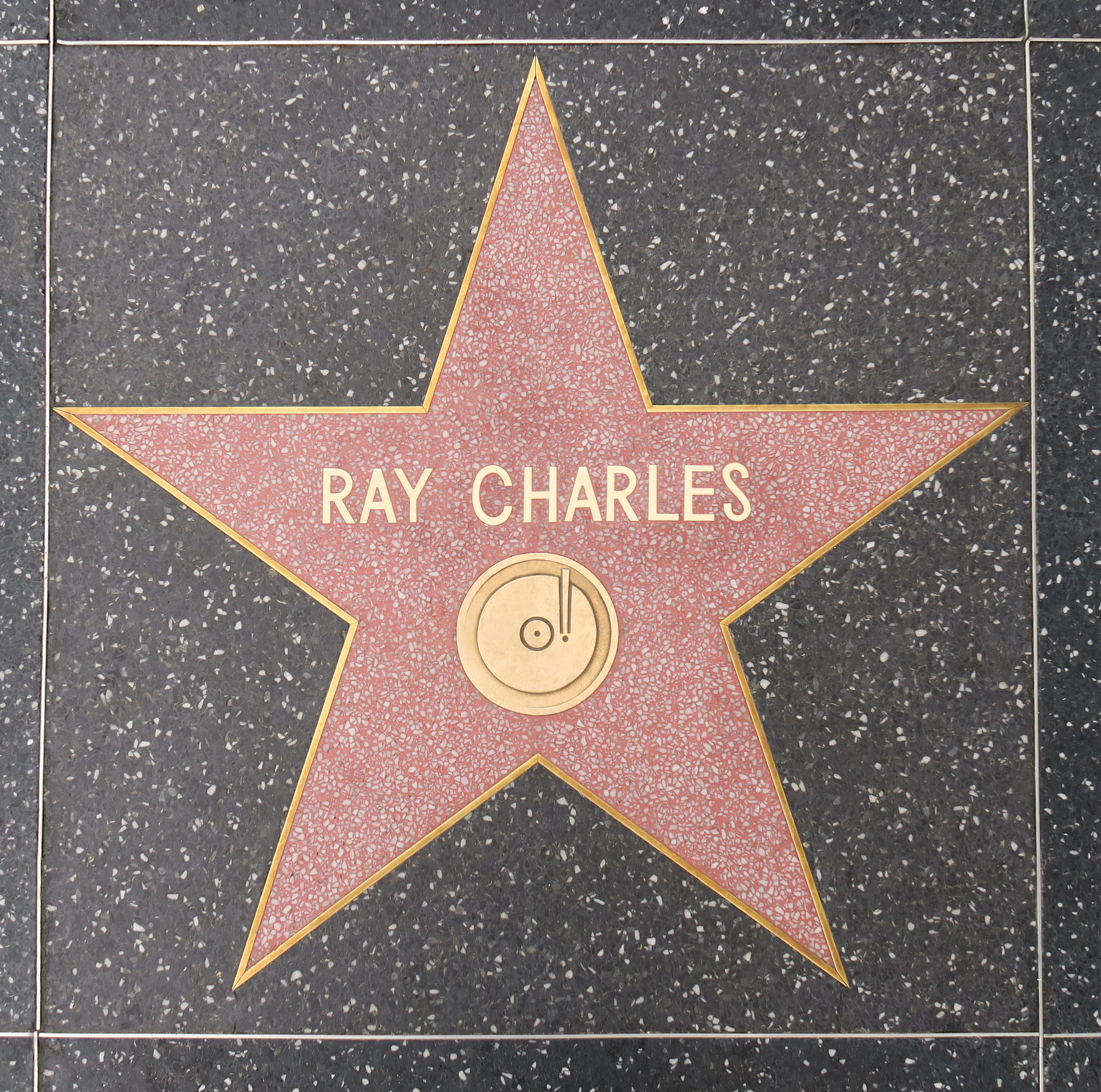
Star honoring Charles on the Hollywood Walk of Fame, at 6777 Hollywood Boulevard

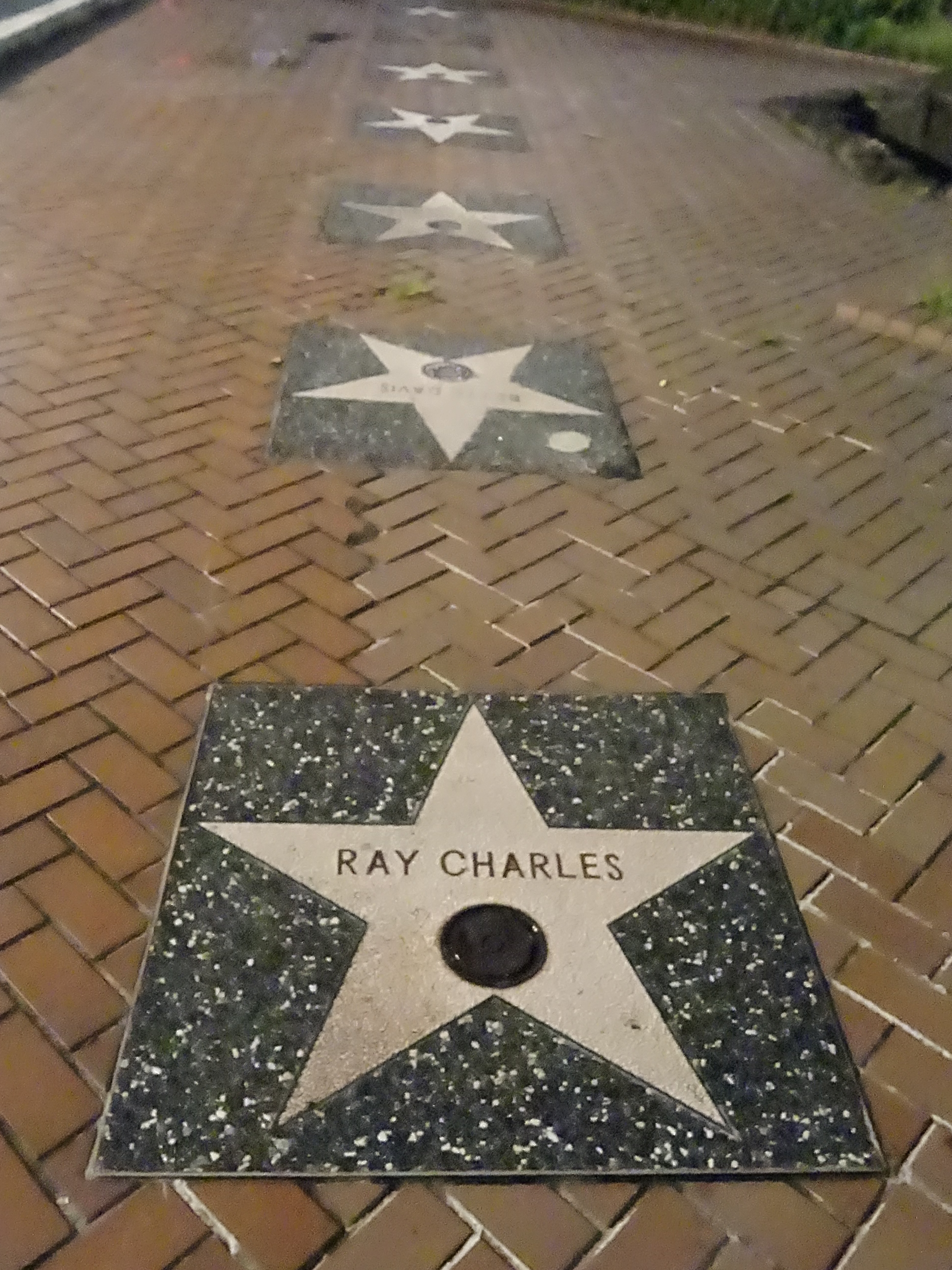
Star honoring Charles on the Nagoya Walk of Fame in Japan

In 1975, Ray Charles was inducted into the American Academy of Achievement and presented with the Golden Plate Award and the Academy of Achievement gold medal.

In 1979, Charles was one of the first musicians born in the state to be inducted into the Georgia Music Hall of Fame. His version of "Georgia on My Mind" was also made the official state song of the state of Georgia.

In 1981, Charles was given a star on the Hollywood Walk of Fame.

In 1986, Charles was one of the first inductees to the Rock & Roll Hall of Fame at its inaugural ceremony. He also received the Kennedy Center Honors in 1986.

Charles won 17 Grammy Awards from his 37 nominations. In 1987, he was awarded the Grammy Lifetime Achievement Award.

In 1990, Charles was given an honorary doctorate of fine arts by the University of South Florida. The following year, he was inducted to the Rhythm & Blues Foundation and was presented with the George and Ira Gershwin Award for Lifetime Musical Achievement during the 1991 UCLA Spring Sing.

In 1993, Charles was awarded the National Medal of Arts. Five years later, he was awarded the Polar Music Prize, together with Ravi Shankar, in Stockholm, Sweden. In 2004, Charles was inducted to the National Black Sports & Entertainment Hall of Fame. The Grammy Awards of 2005 were dedicated to him.

In 2001, Morehouse College honored Charles with the Candle Award for Lifetime Achievement in Arts and Entertainment, and later that same year granted him an honorary doctor of humane letters. Charles donated $2 million to Morehouse "to fund, educate and inspire the next generation of musical pioneers".

In 2003, Charles was awarded an honorary degree by Dillard University, and upon his death he endowed a professorship of African-American culinary history at the school, the first such chair in the nation.

On September 22, 2004, Charles was honored with a Google Doodle on what would have been his 74th birthday. It was one of the first Doodles for someone's birthday.

In 2010, a $20 million, 76,000 sq ft (7,100 m^{2}) facility named the Ray Charles Performing Arts Center and Music Academic Building, opened at Morehouse.

The United States Postal Service issued a forever stamp honoring Charles, as part of its Musical Icons series, on September 23, 2013.

In 2015, Charles was inducted into the Rhythm and Blues Music Hall of Fame.

In 2016, U.S. President Barack Obama wrote via his press secretary, "Ray Charles's version of 'America the Beautiful' will always be in my view the most patriotic piece of music ever performed."

In 2022, Charles was posthumously inducted into the Country Music Hall of Fame, the third African-American to be inducted after Charley Pride (2000) and Deford Bailey (2005). He was also the 13th person to be inducted into both the Country and Rock Halls of Fame.

=== Contribution to civil rights movement ===
On March 15, 1961, shortly after the release of the hit song "Georgia on My Mind" (1960), the Albany, Georgia-born musician was scheduled to perform at a dance at Bell Auditorium in Augusta, but cancelled the show after learning from students of Paine College that the larger auditorium dance floor was restricted to whites, while blacks would be obliged to sit in the Music Hall balcony. Charles left town immediately after letting the public know why he would not be performing, but the promoter went on to sue Charles for breach of contract, and Charles was fined $757 in Fulton County Superior Court in Atlanta on June 14, 1962. The following year, Charles did perform at a desegregated Bell Auditorium concert together with his backup singers, the Raelettes, on October 23, 1963, as depicted in the 2004 film, Ray. On December 7, 2007, Ray Charles Plaza was opened in Albany, Georgia, with a revolving, lighted bronze sculpture of Charles seated at a piano.

=== The Ray Charles Foundation ===
Statue by Andy Davis in Ray Charles Plaza in Albany, Georgia

Founded in 1986, the Ray Charles Foundation maintains the mission statement of financially supporting institutions and organizations in the research of hearing disorders. Originally known as The Robinson Foundation for Hearing Disorders, it was renamed in 2006 and has provided financial donations to numerous institutions involved in hearing loss research and education. The purpose of the foundation has been "to administer funds for scientific, educational and charitable purposes; to encourage, promote and educate, through grants to institutions and organizations, as to the causes and cures for diseases and disabilities of the hearing impaired and to assist organizations and institutions in their social educational and academic advancement of programs for the youth, and carry on other charitable and educational activities associated with these goals as allowed by law."

Recipients of donations include Benedict College, Morehouse College, and other universities. The foundation has taken action against donation recipients who do not use funds in accordance with its mission statement, such as the Albany State University, which was made to return a $3 million donation after not using the funds for over a decade. The foundation houses its executive offices at the historic RPM International Building, originally the home of Ray Charles Enterprises and now also home to the Ray Charles Memorial Library on the first floor, which was founded on September 23, 2010 (what would have been his 80th birthday). The library was founded to "provide an avenue for young children to experience music and art in a way that will inspire their creativity and imagination", and is not open to the public without reservation, as the main goal is to educate mass groups of underprivileged youth and provide art and history to those without access to such documents.

== Personal life ==
Charles stated in his 1978 autobiography, Brother Ray: Ray Charles' Own Story, that he became hooked on women after losing his virginity at 12 years old to a woman who was about 20. "Cigarettes and smack [heroin] are the two truly addictive habits I've known. You might add women," he said. "My obsession centers on women—did then [when young] and does now. I can't leave them alone," he added.

=== Relationships and children ===
Charles was married twice. His first marriage lasted less than a year, his second 22 years. Throughout his life, Charles had many relationships with women, and he fathered a dozen children.

Charles was married to his first wife, Eileen Williams, from July 31, 1951, until sometime in 1952.

Charles met his second wife, Della Beatrice Howard Robinson (called "Bea" by Charles), in Texas in 1954. They married the following year, on April 5, 1955. Their first child, Ray Charles Robinson Jr., was born in 1955. Charles was not in town for the birth because he was playing a show in Texas. The couple had two more sons, David and Robert, and raised their children in View Park, California. Charles felt that his heroin addiction took a toll on Della during their marriage. Due to his drug addiction, extramarital affairs on tours and volatile behavior, the marriage deteriorated and she filed for divorce in 1977.

Charles had a six-year-long affair with Margie Hendrix, one of the original Raelettes, and in 1959 they had a son, Charles Wayne. His affair with Mae Mosley Lyles, another member of the Raelettes, resulted in a daughter, Renee, born in 1961. In 1963, Charles had another daughter, Sheila Raye Charles, by Sandra Jean Betts. Sheila Raye, like her father, was a singer-songwriter; she died of breast cancer on June 15, 2017. In 1977, Charles had a child with his Parisian lover, Arlette Kotchounian, whom he had met 10 years earlier. Charles's longtime girlfriend and partner at the time of his death was Norma Pinella.

Charles fathered a total of 12 children with nine different women:

- Evelyn Robinson, born in 1949 (daughter with Louise Flowers)
- Ray Charles Robinson Jr., born May 25, 1955 (son with wife Della Bea Robinson)
- David Robinson, born in 1958 (son with wife Della Bea Robinson)
- Charles Wayne Hendricks, born on October 1, 1959 (son with Margie Hendricks, one of the Raelettes)
- Robert Robinson, born in 1960 (son with wife Della Bea Robinson)
- Renee Robinson, born in 1961 (daughter with Mae Mosely Lyles, one of the Raelettes)
- Sheila Robinson, born in 1963 (daughter with Sandra Jean Betts)
- Reatha Butler, born in 1966 (daughter with Mary-Chantal Bertrand)
- Alexandra Bertrand, born in 1968 (daughter with Mary-Chantal Bertrand)
- Vincent Kotchounian, born in 1977 (son with Arlette Kotchounian)
- Robyn Moffett, born in 1978 (daughter with Gloria Moffett)
- Ryan Corey Robinson den Bok, born in 1987 (son with Mary Anne den Bok)

Charles held a family luncheon for his 12 children in 2002, 10 of whom attended. Charles told them that he was terminally ill and that $500,000 had been placed in trusts for each of them, to be paid out over the next five years.

=== Drug abuse and legal problems ===
At 18, Charles first tried marijuana when he played in McSon Trio and was eager to try it as he thought it helped musicians create music and tap into their creativity. He later became addicted to heroin for seventeen years. Charles was first arrested in 1955, when he and his bandmates were caught backstage with loose marijuana and drug paraphernalia, including a burnt spoon, syringe, and needle. The arrest did not deter his drug use, which only escalated as he became more successful and made more money.

In 1958, Charles was arrested on a Harlem street corner for possession of narcotics and equipment for administering heroin.

Charles was arrested on a narcotics charge on November 14, 1961, while waiting in an Indiana hotel room before a performance. The detectives seized heroin, marijuana, and other items. Charles, then 31, said he had been a drug addict since the age of 16. The case was dismissed because of the manner in which the evidence was obtained, but Charles's situation did not improve until a few years later.

On Halloween 1964, Charles was arrested for possession of heroin at Boston's Logan Airport. He decided to quit heroin and entered St. Francis Hospital in Lynwood, California, where he endured four days of cold turkey withdrawal. Following his self-imposed stay, he pleaded guilty to four narcotic charges. Prosecutors called for two years in prison and a hefty fine, but the judge listened to Charles's psychiatrist, Dr. Hacker's account of Charles's determination to get off drugs and he was sent to McLean Hospital in Belmont, Massachusetts. The judge offered to postpone the verdict for a year if Charles agreed to undergo regular examinations by government-appointed physicians. When Charles returned to court, he received a five-year suspended sentence, four years of probation, and a fine of $10,000.

Charles responded to the saga of his drug use and reform with the songs "I Don't Need No Doctor" and "Let's Go Get Stoned" and the release of Crying Time, his first album since kicking his heroin addiction in 1966.

=== Chess hobby ===
Charles enjoyed playing chess. As part of his therapy when he quit heroin, he met with psychiatrist Friedrich Hacker, who taught him how to play chess. He used a special board with raised squares and holes for the pieces. When questioned if people try to cheat against a blind man, he joked in reply, "You can't cheat in Chess... I'm gonna see that!" In a 1991 concert, he referred to Willie Nelson as "my chess partner". In 2002, he played and lost to the American grandmaster and former U.S. champion Larry Evans. When Evans complimented him for spotting a tactical trap he had set, Charles replied "Come on man, I play bad, but not that bad!"

== Death ==
In 2003, Charles had successful hip replacement surgery and was planning to go back on tour, but then he began having other ailments. Charles died on June 10, 2004, at age 73, of complications resulting from liver failure at his home in Beverly Hills, California. His funeral was held at the First African Methodist Episcopal Church of Los Angeles eight days later, with numerous musical figures in attendance. B. B. King, Glen Campbell, Stevie Wonder and Wynton Marsalis each played a tribute at the funeral. Charles was interred in the Inglewood Park Cemetery.

Charles' final album, Genius Loves Company, released two months after his death, consists of duets with admirers and contemporaries: B.B. King, Van Morrison, Willie Nelson, James Taylor, Gladys Knight, Michael McDonald, Natalie Cole, Elton John, Bonnie Raitt, Diana Krall, Norah Jones, and Johnny Mathis. The album won eight Grammy Awards, including Best Pop Vocal Album, Album of the Year, Record of the Year and Best Pop Collaboration with Vocals (for "Here We Go Again", with Norah Jones), and Best Gospel Performance (for "Heaven Help Us All", with Gladys Knight); he also received nods for his duets with Elton John and B.B. King. The album included a version of Harold Arlen and E. Y. Harburg's "Over the Rainbow", sung as a duet with Johnny Mathis, which was played at Charles's memorial service.

== Discography ==
Charles's discography is highly complex and extensive. AllMusic has listed approximately 60 original albums and more than 200 compilation albums, while music essayist Robert Christgau noted the existence of more. At least 20 record labels have released near-identical compilations of Charles's pre-Atlantic Records tracks, while many of the masters that Charles began to own after 1960 were not digitally reissued, leading the Atlantic sister label Rhino Entertainment to focus on rereleasing his mid-to-late 1950s music. Christgau has called Charles's discography a "monumental mess" and that "any map of his oeuvre must be personal and provisional".

=== Studio albums ===
- Ray Charles (1957)
- The Great Ray Charles (1957)
- Soul Brothers (with Milt Jackson, 1958)
- Yes Indeed! (1958)
- What'd I Say (1959)
- The Genius of Ray Charles (1959)
- The Genius Hits the Road (1960)
- Dedicated to You (1961)
- Genius + Soul = Jazz (1961)
- Ray Charles and Betty Carter (with Betty Carter, 1961)
- The Genius Sings the Blues (part-compilation, 1961)
- Soul Meeting (with Milt Jackson, 1961)
- The Genius After Hours (1961)
- Modern Sounds in Country and Western Music (1962)
- Modern Sounds in Country and Western Music Volume Two (1962)
- Ingredients in a Recipe for Soul (1963)
- Sweet & Sour Tears (1964)
- Have a Smile with Me (1964)
- Together Again (1965)
- Crying Time (1966)
- Ray's Moods (1966)
- Ray Charles Invites You to Listen (1967)
- A Portrait of Ray (1968)
- I'm All Yours Baby! (1969)
- Doing His Thing (1969)
- My Kind of Jazz (1970)
- Love Country Style (1970)
- Volcanic Action of My Soul (1971)
- A Message from the People (1972)
- Through the Eyes of Love (1972)
- Jazz Number II (1973)
- Renaissance (1975)
- My Kind of Jazz Part 3 (1975)
- Porgy and Bess (with Cleo Laine, 1976)
- True to Life (1977)
- Love & Peace (1978)
- Ain't It So (1979)
- Brother Ray Is at It Again (1980)
- Wish You Were Here Tonight (1983)
- Do I Ever Cross Your Mind (1984)
- Friendship (1984)
- The Spirit of Christmas (1984)
- From the Pages of My Mind (1986)
- Just Between Us (1988)
- Would You Believe? (1990)
- My World (1993)
- Strong Love Affair (1996)
- Thanks for Bringing Love Around Again (2002)

=== Posthumous studio albums ===
- Genius Loves Company (2004)
- Genius & Friends (2005)
- No One Does It Like.. Ray Charles ! (2025)

== Filmography ==
=== Film ===
Year	Title	Role	Notes
1961	Swingin' Along	Himself	
1965	Ballad in Blue	Himself	
1966	The Big T.N.T. Show	Himself	Documentary film
1980	The Blues Brothers	Ray	Cameo appearance
1989	Limit Up	Julius	
1990	Listen Up: The Lives of Quincy Jones	Himself	Documentary
1994	Love Affair	Himself	Cameo appearance
1996	Spy Hard	Bus Driver	Cameo appearance
1998	New Yorkers 2	Himself	Cameo appearance
2000	The Extreme Adventures of Super Dave	Himself	
2000	Blue's Big Musical Movie	G-Clef (voice)	First voice and final film role
2004	Ray	Himself	Uncredited; Archival footage
2014	Face of Unity	Himself	includes tributes to Nelson Mandela from President Barack Obama, Samuel L. Jackson, Ray Charles, and Morgan Freeman.

=== Television ===
Year	Title	Role	Notes
1977	Saturday Night Live	Himself (host)	Season 3, Episode 5
1977	Sesame Street	Himself	3 episodes
1987	Who's the Boss	Himself	Episode: "Hit the Road, Chad"
1987	St. Elsewhere	Arthur Tibbits	Episode: "Jose, Can You See?"
1987	Moonlighting	Himself	Episode: "A Trip to the Moon"
1987–1990	Super Dave	Himself	4 episodes
1994	Ray Alexander: A Taste for Justice		Television movie
1994	Wings	Himself	Episode: "A Decent Proposal"
1997–1998	The Nanny	Sammy	4 episodes

== See also ==
- Album era
- Progressive soul
