= Love & Peace (Ray Charles album) =

Studio album by Ray Charles
- Released: 1978
- Genre: R&B
- Label: Atlantic
- Producer: Ray Charles

Ray Charles chronology
True to Life (1977)	Love & Peace (1978)	The Early Years (1978)

Love & Peace is an album by the American musician Ray Charles, released in 1978. It peaked at No. 35 on Billboard's Top Black Albums chart. Charles supported the album with a North American tour.

== Production ==
The album was produced by Charles. He used a 24-track machine, picking and mixing his favorite rhythm and horn parts; due to the pervasiveness of disco, he somewhat reluctantly added layers of synthesizers to some of the tracks. "Riding Thumb" was written by Seals and Crofts. "We Had It All" was written by Troy Seals and Donnie Fritts. The Raelettes backed Charles on "Take Off That Dress". "Give the Poor Man a Break" is addressed to President Carter.

== Critical reception ==
Professional ratings
Review scores
Source	Rating
AllMusic	1.5/5 stars
Robert Christgau	B−
Journal Herald	D
Omaha World-Herald	4.5/5 stars
Pittsburgh Post-Gazette	C
The Rolling Stone Album Guide	2.5/5 stars
The Virgin Encyclopedia of R&B and Soul	2/5 stars

The Bay State Banner wrote that "the album works because Ray knows how to fit a tune or a lyric into his own unique method, and his strong singing remains impressive." Robert Christgau noted that, "with a filler from his publishing subsidiary at a redundant nadir, the same old horn charts and obligatory big productions really begin to grate." The Boston Globe called the album "a hard-hitting affair where he tackles contemporary R&B trends and proves conclusively that he is no bygone relic."

The Kansas City Star determined that "it occasionally sounds a little heavy-handed and overpowering, but most of the time that pounding sound fits right in with the overall effect Charles seems to want." The Pittsburgh Post-Gazette panned Charles's selection of "mediocre" material. The Richmond Times-Dispatch concluded that Love & Peace "is what happens when an exceptional blues and jazz interpreter attempts to sing down to the common denominator."

AllMusic wrote: "His powers of expression as a vocalist and keyboardist are undiminished on the second album of his return to the Atlantic fold; he could still squeeze some soul out of anything... But his ability to choose great, good, or even merely appropriate material had deserted him." The Rolling Stone Album Guide labeled "You 20th Century Fox" "a genuine hoot."

== Track listing ==
No.	Title	Length
1.	"You 20th Century Fox"
2.	"Take Off That Dress"
3.	"She Knows"
4.	"Riding Thumb"
5.	"We Had It All"
6.	"No Achievement Showing"
7.	"A Peace That We Never Before Could Enjoy"
8.	"Is There Anyone Out There?"
9.	"Give the Poor Man a Break"

== Personnel ==
- Ray Charles – vocals, piano
