= Confession Blues =

Single by The McSon Trio (Ray Charles band)
- B-side: "I Love You, I Love You"
- Released: February 1949
- Recorded: 1948
- Studio: Seattle recording studio
- Genre: Rhythm and blues, jazz
- Length: 2:31
- Label: Down Beat Records
- Songwriter: R. C. Robinson (Ray Charles)

"Confession Blues" is a song by The McSon Trio released in 1949 as a single on the Down Beat Records label (later known as "Swing Time Records"). The single featured American Rhythm and blues musician Ray Charles on piano and vocals, and was also written by Charles himself under his birth name Ray Charles Robinson (listed on the recording credits as R. C. Robinson).

Charles moved to Seattle in 1948, where he founded "The McSon Trio" with guitarist G. D. "Gossie" McKee and bassist Milton S. Garret. In late 1948, Jack Lauderdale of Down Beat Records heard Charles play at the Seattle jazz club, "The Rocking Chair". The next day, Lauderdale took Charles and his trio to a Seattle recording studio where they recorded "Confession Blues" and "I Love You, I Love You". In February 1949, the two songs were released as Down Beat record number 171 with "Confession Blues" as the B-side. The band name — The McSon Trio — was unwillingly listed as The Maxin Trio on the record. The song became the first single recorded by Charles to chart. "Confession Blues", as well as much of Charles' early work, was grounded in the style of jazz musicians like Nat King Cole and Charles Brown. The song entered the charts in early April 1949 at No. 11 on "the Billboard Best Selling Retail Race Records chart" (renamed "the Retail Rhythm & Blues Records chart" a short time later). It peaked at No. 5 in mid-May 1949.
