= Friedrich Hacker =

Austrian-American psychiatrist (1914–1989)

- Born: 19 January 1914; Vienna, Austria-Hungary
- Died: 23 June 1989 (aged 75); Mainz, West Germany
- Occupations: Psychiatrist, psychoanalyst
- Known for: Research on aggression, violence, and terrorism

Friedrich Hacker (19 January 1914 – 23 June 1989) was an Austrian-American psychiatrist and psychoanalyst known for his interdisciplinary work on aggression, violence, and terrorism. He became a prominent public expert in the United States during the 1960s and 1970s and served as a consultant and forensic evaluator in several high-profile criminal cases.

== Early life and education ==
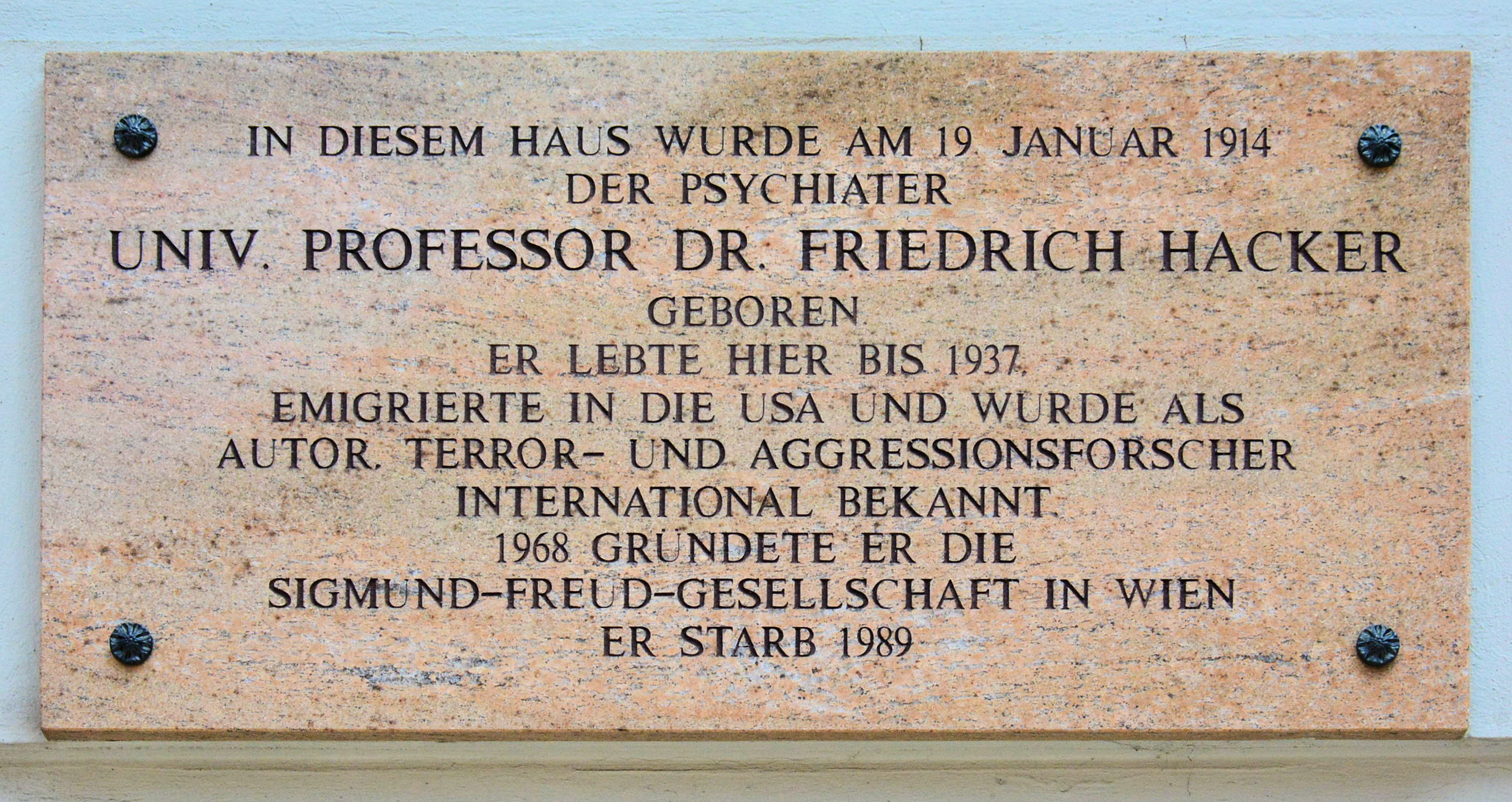
Commemorative plaque at Friedrich Hackers birthplace in Vienna (Hegelgasse 21), where he lived until 1937.

Hacker was born in Vienna and studied medicine at the University of Vienna. After the Anschluss in 1938, he first fled to Switzerland before emigrating to the United States, where he completed his psychiatric training and pursued psychoanalytic studies. He later settled in Los Angeles, California.

== Early life and education ==
Hacker was born in Vienna and studied medicine at the University of Vienna. After the Anschluss in 1938, he was expelled from the university and first fled to Switzerland before emigrating to the United States, where he completed his psychiatric training and pursued psychoanalytic studies. He later settled in Los Angeles, California.

== Career ==
In Los Angeles, Hacker established himself as a psychiatrist and psychoanalyst with a growing interest in the psychological and social roots of violence. In 1968 he founded the Institute for the Study of Violence, one of the first centers to approach violence as a multidisciplinary phenomenon involving psychiatry, sociology, political science, and criminology.

Hacker also became involved in the Patty Hearst case, serving as one of the psychiatrists who examined her after her arrest and providing assessments of her psychological condition. His evaluations contributed to the broader public and legal debate over Hearst's mental state, coercion, and the effects of her captivity by the Symbionese Liberation Army. During the 1970s he became widely known for his analyses of terrorism, radicalization, and political violence. He lectured internationally, advised governmental and law-enforcement agencies, and appeared frequently in media discussions on contemporary violence.

Hacker also worked as a forensic psychiatrist and was consulted in several notable criminal proceedings.

== Research and contributions ==
Hacker's work combined psychoanalytic theory with broader social-scientific perspectives. His main areas of research included:

- psychological mechanisms of aggression and violent behavior,
- pathways to radicalization and political extremism,
- the role of communication and symbolism in terrorism,
- family and group dynamics associated with violence,
- societal conditions that foster violent behavior.

His writings contributed to early interdisciplinary violence studies and influenced public debates on terrorism in the 1970s.

== Selected publications ==
- Aggression: The Myth of the Beast Within. New York, 1971.
- Crusaders, Criminals, Crazies: Terror and Terrorism in Our Time. New York, 1976.
- Children of Violence. Los Angeles, 1979.

== See also ==
- Susanne Krejsa MacManus: „Kein Massaker ohne Hacker“, Wiener Geschichtsblätter 3-4/2025, 213-221.
- Susanne Krejsa MacManus: „Kein Massaker ohne Hacker“, https://magazin.wienmuseum.at/zum-35-todestag-von-friedrich-hacker, 20. 6. 2024.
