= Wish You Were Here Tonight =

Studio album by Ray Charles
- Released: 1983
- Genre: Country
- Label: Columbia
- Producer: Ray Charles

Ray Charles chronology
Brother Ray Is at It Again (1980)	Wish You Were Here Tonight (1983)	Do I Ever Cross Your Mind (1984)

Wish You Were Here Tonight is an album by the American musician Ray Charles, released in 1983. Charles shot videos for the title track and "3/4 Time"; both were nominated for American Video Awards.

"Born to Love Me" was nominated for a Grammy Award for "Best Country Vocal Performance, Male". The album peaked at No. 29 on Billboard's Top Country Albums chart. It was a moderate commercial success.

== Production ==
Produced by Charles, the album was recorded in Los Angeles. Charles recorded many of the songs in a country music style, employing mandolin, banjo, and fiddle. "Let Your Love Flow" is a cover of the Bellamy Brothers song.

== Critical reception ==
Professional ratings
Review scores
Source	Rating
AllMusic	3/5 stars
Robert Christgau	B
The Encyclopedia of Popular Music	2/5 stars
The Rolling Stone Album Guide	3/5 stars

The Globe and Mail wrote that "the material Charles has chosen is nearly all third-rate and the arrangements limp along hopelessly out of synch with the growl and roar of his voice." The Philadelphia Daily News opined that "it's the best he's made in the better part of a decade, and whatever the weakest material is more than made up for by his always wise and whimsical performances." Robert Christgau deemed the album "another rehash of his jokey, deeply felt shtick... Not that it can't be great shtick."

== Track listing ==
No.	Title	Writer(s)	Length
1.	"3/4 Time"	T. J. White
2.	"I Wish You Were Here Tonight"	J. Sullins
3.	"Ain't Your Memory Got No Pride at All"	R. Lane, R. Porter, B. Jones
4.	"Born to Love Me"	B. Morrison
5.	"I Don't Want No Stranger Sleepin' in My Bed"	B. Emerson, G. Jones
6.	"Let Your Love Flow"	L. E. Williams
7.	"You Feel Good All Over"	S. Throckmorton
8.	"String Bean"	J. Lewis
9.	"You've Got the Longest Leaving Act in Town"	S. Throckmorton, D. Kirby
10.	"Shakin' Your Head"	M. Smotherman
