= True to Life (Ray Charles album) =

Studio album by Ray Charles
- Released: October 1977
- Recorded: 1977
- Studios: R.P.M International, Los Angeles, California
- Genres: R&B, soul
- Length: 38:44
- Label: Atlantic
- Producer: Ray Charles

Ray Charles chronology
Porgy and Bess (1976)	True to Life (1977)	Love & Peace (1978)

True to Life is a 1977 studio album by American musician Ray Charles. It marked Charles's return to Atlantic Records. The album contains cover versions of popular songs, including Johnny Nash's "I Can See Clearly Now", Bobby Charles' "The Jealous Kind", George and Ira Gershwin's "How Long Has This Been Going On?", and the Beatles' "Let It Be". The album was arranged by Larry Muhoberac, Roger Newman, Sid Feller and Ray Charles.

== Critical reception ==
Professional ratings
Review scores
Source	Rating
AllMusic	3/5 stars
Christgau's Record Guide	A−
The Rolling Stone Album Guide	3/5 stars

The Bay State Banner wrote: "His album is not new ground, the break-through his name on a song once assured; but it is sensitive, sometimes exhilarating, stuff."

== Track listing ==
1. "I Can See Clearly Now" (Johnny Nash) – 4:22
2. "The Jealous Kind" (Robert Guidry) – 4:38
3. "Oh, What a Beautiful Mornin'" (Oscar Hammerstein II, Richard Rodgers) – 4:30
4. "How Long Has This Been Going On?" (George Gershwin, Ira Gershwin) –- 5:07
5. "Be My Love" (Nicholas Brodsky, Sammy Cahn) – 4:19
6. "Anonymous Love" (Edward Langford, Joel Webster) – 4:36
7. "Heavenly Music" (Bob Bradstreet, Solomon Burke) – 3:38
8. "Game Number Nine" (Dee Ervin, Tommy Payton) – 4:07
9. "Let It Be" (John Lennon, Paul McCartney) – 3:27

== Personnel ==
- Ray Charles – arranger, engineer, keyboards, piano, producer, vocals
- Sid Feller – arranger
- Bob Gratts – engineer
- Robert Gratts – engineer
- Larry Muhoberac – arranger
- Roger Newman – arranger
