= Doing His Thing =

Studio album by Ray Charles
- Released: May 1969
- Recorded: RPM, Los Angeles, California
- Genre: Soul
- Length: 32:33
- Label: ABC/Tangerine
- Producer: Joe Adams

Ray Charles chronology
I'm All Yours Baby (1969)	Doing His Thing (1969)	My Kind of Jazz (1970)

Doing His Thing is a 1969 studio album by Ray Charles, released by Tangerine Records. The cover artwork was by Lafayette Chew.

== Chart performance ==
The album debuted on Billboard magazine's Top LP's chart in the issue dated July 26, 1969, peaking at No. 172 during a three-week run on the chart.

== Critical reception ==
Professional ratings
Review scores
Source	Rating
The Rolling Stone Album Guide	4/5 stars
The Village Voice	A

In his January 1970 "Consumer Guide" column, The Village Voice critic Robert Christgau wrote of Charles and the LP: "It's so easy to forget what a genius he still is. No balladeering here, no Beatle-mongering, nothing but hard-bopping Ray Charles soul. Yeah." In The Rolling Stone Album Guide (1992), J. D. Considine said it marked a return to Charles' funkier style of music with "an album that's long on groove but short on songs (although the interplay between Charles and Jimmy Lewis on 'If It Wasn't for Bad Luck' is delightful)".

Rex Reed's review of the album for Stereo Review in December 1969 stated, "Ray Charles is one singer who can be counted on to do his own thing, and if you dig his doing it over and over again, you'll love this record. Mr. Charles has collaborated in writing several of the songs here, and Jimmy Lewis has a credit on every one of them. The result is a sameness of emotional content, musical style, and tempo. Over it all hangs Charles' hearty wail, like a baitrabbit leading a pack of greyhounds. Round and round the track he leads them. If you're an avid Charles fan, you'll still be in the stands for the final band. I left this event early and went to one of my favorite restaurants, where they still have 'Ruby' on the jukebox." Reviewing the cassette, 8-track and reel-to-reel versions two months later, Don Heckman, in the same publication, wrote:

Like most blues performers, Ray Charles is at his best when he works with material that is close to fundamentals. Composer Jimmy Lewis has provided just that—a panorama of contemporary blues—and Charles responds brilliantly. No country-&-western, no pop standards, no rock tunes—just one of the consummate blues performers of the day working with new material and sympathetic backing. A must for Ray Charles freaks; a joy for anyone else.

== Track listing ==
all songs written by Jimmy Lewis except as noted

=== Side A ===
1. "The Same Thing That Can Make You Laugh (Can Make You Cry)" (Jimmy Lewis, Ray Charles) – 2:06
2. "Finders Keepers, Losers Weepers" (Cliff Chambers, Jimmy Holiday, Jimmy Lewis) – 2:25
3. "You Ought to Change Your Ways" – 2:45
4. "Baby Please" – 3:35
5. "Come and Get It" – 2:48

=== Side B ===
1. "We Can Make It" – 3:43
2. "I’m Ready" – 3:20
3. "That Thing Called Love" – 2:54
4. "If It Wasn’t for Bad Luck" (Jimmy Lewis, Ray Charles) – 4:45
5. "I Told You So" – 4:11

== Personnel ==
- Ray Charles – keyboards, vocals
- Jimmy Lewis – vocals

== Charts ==
Chart (1969)	Peak position
US Billboard Top LPs	172

== Notes / references ==
- ABC 695
- Doing His Thing at Allmusic.com
