= The Birth of Soul =

Box set by Ray Charles
- Released: October 1, 1991
- Recorded: 1952–1959
- Genre: Rhythm and blues; soul; blues
- Length: 148:48
- Label: Atlantic
- Producer: Herb Abramson, Ahmet Ertegün, and Jerry Wexler

Ray Charles chronology
Rhythm & Blues: Ray Charles – 1954–1966 (1991)	The Birth of Soul (1991)	His Greatest Hits (1992)

Professional ratings
Review scores
Source	Rating
AllMusic	5/5 stars
Down Beat	5/5 stars
The Rolling Stone Album Guide	5/5 stars

The Birth of Soul: The Complete Atlantic Rhythm and Blues Recordings is a 3-CD box set compilation by American musician Ray Charles, released in 1991.

== Critical reception ==
In a contemporary review, Peter Watrous of The New York Times said that the box set "tracks the progress of a figure who profoundly changed what was possible in American music." He ranked it as the twelfth best album of 1991. The Birth of Soul was voted the third best reissue of the year in The Village Voice's annual Pazz & Jop critics' poll for 1991.

In 2003, the album was ranked number 54 on Rolling Stone magazine's list of the 500 greatest albums of all time, maintaining the rating in a 2012 revised list, then dropping to number 210 in a 2020 reboot of the list. In a retrospective article for the magazine, Robert Christgau wrote that, despite "caveats" such as material repeated on more "economic" releases, The Birth of Soul is "the rockingest Charles long-form you can buy" and remarked on the legacy of its recordings:

Although Charles' fabled blues-gospel synthesis is on display from 'I Got a Woman' to 'I Believe to My Soul,' 'birth of soul' gets the emphasis wrong. Seldom conventionally catchy, this Robert Palmer-annotated collection epitomizes a world-historic catchall of a genre that Charles could only describe as 'genuine down-to-earth Negro music' — namely, rhythm & blues. Crack bands, first Atlantic's and then his own, underpin his rich, gravelly vocals with hard-hitting grooves of deceptive rhythmic and harmonic complexity. Halfway in, a female backup group soon to be known as the Raelettes starts shoring up his male voice and egging it on, an innovation that became a cliche so fast people think it was always there.

Christgau recommended Rhino Entertainment's 1994 compilation album The Best of Ray Charles: The Atlantic Years as a cheaper alternative to the box set.

== Track listing ==
All tracks are written by Ray Charles, unless otherwise noted.

Disc 1 (1952–1954)
No.	Title	Writer(s)	Length
1.	"The Sun's Gonna Shine Again"		2:36
2.	"Roll With My Baby"		2:35
3.	"The Midnight Hour"	Sam Sweet	2:59
4.	"Jumpin' in the Mornin'"		2:44
5.	"It Should Have Been Me"	Memphis Curtis	2:42
6.	"Losing Hand"	Charles Calhoun	3:11
7.	"Heartbreaker"	Ahmet Ertegun	2:51
8.	"Sinner's Prayer"	Lowell Fulson; Lloyd Glenn	3:21
9.	"Mess Around"	Ahmet Nugetre	2:38
10.	"Funny But I Still Love You"		3:12
11.	"Feelin' Sad"	Eddie Jones	2:47
12.	"I Wonder Who"		2:47
13.	"Don't You Know"		2:55
14.	"Nobody Cares"		2:37
15.	"Ray's Blues"		2:52
16.	"Mr. Charles' Blues"		2:45
17.	"Blackjack"		2:18
Total length:			47:50

Disc 2 (1954–1957)
No.	Title	Writer(s)	Length
1.	"I Got a Woman"	Ray Charles; Renald Richard	2:50
2.	"Greenbacks"	Ray Charles; Renald Richard	2:48
3.	"Come Back Baby"		3:04
4.	"A Fool for You"		3:00
5.	"This Little Girl of Mine"		2:30
6.	"Hard Times"		2:53
7.	"A Bit of Soul"		2:17
8.	"Mary Ann"		2:45
9.	"Drown in My Own Tears"	Henry Glover	3:19
10.	"Hallelujah, I Love Her So"		2:34
11.	"What Would I Do Without You?"		2:34
12.	"Lonely Avenue"	Doc Pomus	2:33
13.	"I Want to Know"		2:09
14.	"Leave My Woman Alone"		2:38
15.	"It's Alright"		2:15
16.	"Ain't That Love"		2:51
17.	"Get on the Right Track"	Titus Turner	2:17
18.	"RockHouse (Parts 1 & 2)"		3:51
Total length:			49:08

Disc 3 (1957–1959)
No.	Title	Writer(s)	Length
1.	"Swanee River Rock"		2:18
2.	"That's Enough"		2:43
3.	"Talkin' 'bout You"		2:49
4.	"What Kind of Man Are You"		2:47
5.	"I Want a Little Girl"	Murray Mencher; Billy Moll	2:53
6.	"Yes Indeed"	Sy Oliver	2:14
7.	"I Had a Dream"	Ray Charles; Ricky Harper	2:52
8.	"You Be My Baby"	Ray Charles; Doc Pomus; Mort Shuman	2:28
9.	"Tell All the World About You"		2:01
10.	"My Bonnie"		2:44
11.	"Early in the Morning"	Dallas Bartley; Leo Hickman; Louis Jordan	2:43
12.	"(Night Time Is) The Right Time"	Lew Herman	3:26
13.	"Carryin' that Load"	Doc Pomus; Mort Shuman	2:22
14.	"Tell Me How Do You Feel"	Ray Charles; Percy Mayfield	2:42
15.	"What'd I Say (Parts 1 & 2)"		6:26
16.	"Tell the Truth"	Lowman Pauling	3:03
17.	"I'm Movin' On"	Hank Snow	2:20
18.	"I Believe to My Soul"		2:59
Total length:			51:50
