= My Kind of Jazz Part 3 =

Studio album by Ray Charles
- Released: October 1975
- Recorded: 1975 in Los Angeles, CA
- Genre: Soul, jazz
- Length: 38:13
- Label: Crossover
- Producer: Ray Charles

Ray Charles chronology
Renaissance (1975)	My Kind of Jazz Part 3 (1975)	Live In Japan (1975)

My Kind of Jazz Part 3 is a 1975 album by Ray Charles released by Crossover Records. Concord Records re-issued the contents in digital form in 2009.

Professional ratings
Review scores
Source	Rating
Allmusic	link

== Track listing ==
1. "I'm Gonna Go Fishin'" (Duke Ellington) – 5:32
2. "For Her" (Alf Clausen) – 6:18
3. "Sister Sadie" (Horace Silver) – 4:07
4. "3/4 of the Time" (Roger Neumann) – 2:50
5. "Ray Minor Ray" (Benny Golson) – 3:47
6. "Samba de Elencia" (Alf Clausen) – 4:39
7. "Metamorphosis" (Roger Neumann) – 4:12
8. "Nothing Wrong" (Charlie Mariano) – 3:32
9. "Project 'S'" (Jimmy Heath) – 3:16
