= Strong Love Affair =

Studio album by Ray Charles
- Released: January 30, 1996
- Recorded: 1995–1996
- Genre: Soul
- Label: Warner Bros.
- Producer: Ray Charles, Jean-Pierre Grosz

Ray Charles chronology
My World (1993)	Strong Love Affair (1996)	Live at the Olympia, 2000 (2000)

Professional ratings
Review scores
Source	Rating
AllMusic	2/5 stars
Muzik	4/5 stars

Strong Love Affair is a studio album by Ray Charles, released in 1996, through Warner Bros. Records.

== Track listing ==
1. "All She Wants to Do Is Love Me" – 4:15
2. "Say No More" – 4:19
3. "No Time to Waste Time" – 3:38
4. "Angelina" – 4:06
5. "Tell Me What You Want Me to Do" (Ray Charles) – 5:21
6. "Strong Love Affair" – 4:08
7. "Everybody's Handsome Child" – 3:56
8. "Out of My Life" – 4:25
9. "The Fever" – 3:46
10. "Separate Ways" – 4:07
11. "I Need a Good Woman Bad" – 4:59
12. "If You Give Me Your Heart" – 4:27
