= From the Pages of My Mind =

Studio album by Ray Charles
- Released: 1986
- Genre: Country
- Label: Columbia
- Producer: Billy Sherrill, Ray Charles

Ray Charles chronology
The Spirit of Christmas (1984)	From the Pages of My Mind (1986)	Ray Charles – His Greatest Hits, Volume 1/Volume 2 (1987)

From the Pages of My Mind is an album by the American musician Ray Charles, released in 1986. It was Charles's final album dedicated to country music. From the Pages of My Mind peaked at No. 16 on the Top Country Albums chart. "Class Reunion" was released as a single.

== Production ==
Recorded in Nashville and Los Angeles, the album was coproduced by Billy Sherrill. "Anybody with the Blues" was written by Dave Loggins. Pete Drake played pedal steel on the album.

== Critical reception ==
Professional ratings
Review scores
Source	Rating
AllMusic	2.5/5 stars
Atlanta Voice	3/5 stars
The Cincinnati Enquirer	1/5 stars
MusicHound Rock: The Essential Album Guide	2.5/5 stars
The Philadelphia Inquirer	3/4 stars
The Rolling Stone Album Guide	2/5 stars
The Virgin Encyclopedia of R&B and Soul	2/5 stars

The Philadelphia Inquirer wrote that the album "signals one of Charles' periodic returns to country music, and the change in genre has enlivened his vocals." The Boston Globe called it "middle-of-the-road country-pop, with efficient but unexciting studio musicians." The Commercial Appeal concluded that "the usual fire from his throat is suppressed for the twang of country, which he has yet to master after several attempts."

The New York Daily News determined that "the music here is far too subdued, and could use a blast of the old energetic Charles." The Cincinnati Enquirer opined that "Charles is dogging it on this soul-less album." The Edmonton Journal noted that Charles's "solitary, alienated style is an absolute contrast from the tradition of country singers aiming for eye-to-eye, heart-to-hear contact."

AllMusic deemed it "another light country and countrypolitan outing."

== Track listing ==
No.	Title	Length
1.	"The Pages of My Mind"
2.	"Slip Away"
3.	"Anybody with the Blues"
4.	"Class Reunion"
5.	"Caught a Touch of Your Love"
6.	"A Little Bit of Heaven"
7.	"Dixie Moon"
8.	"Over and Over (Again)"
9.	"Beaucoup Love"
10.	"Love Is Worth the Pain"
