= A Portrait of Ray =

Studio album by Ray Charles
- Released: March 1968
- Genre: R&B, soul
- Length: 32:19
- Label: ABC / Tangerine
- Producer: Joe Adams

Ray Charles chronology
Ray Charles Invites You to Listen (1967)	A Portrait of Ray (1968)	I'm All Yours Baby (1969)

A Portrait of Ray is a studio album by Ray Charles released in March 1968.

== Track listing ==
1. "Never Say Naw" (Percy Mayfield) – 3:06
2. "The Sun Died" (Ray Charles, Ann Grégory, Hubert Giraud, Pierre Delanoë) – 3:58
3. "Am I Blue?" (Harry Akst, Grant Clarke) – 4:13
4. "Yesterdays" (Jerome Kern, Otto Harbach) – 4:40
5. "When I Stop Dreaming'" (Ira Louvin, Charlie Louvin) – 3:04
6. "I Won't Leave" (Lou Courtney, Luther Ingram, Robert Bateman) – 3:32
7. "A Sweet Young Thing Like You" (Dee Ervin) – 2:18
8. "The Bright Lights and You Girl" (Sayde Shepherd) – 2:39
9. "Understanding" (Jimmy Holiday, Ray Charles) – 3:12
10. "Eleanor Rigby" (John Lennon, Paul McCartney) – 2:57

== Personnel ==
- Ray Charles – vocals, piano, keyboards
- F. Bryon Clark – engineering, remixing

== Chart positions ==
Chart	Peak chart position
Billboard 200	51
R&B Albums	5
Jazz Albums	4
