= Soul Meeting =

Studio album by Ray Charles and Milt Jackson
- Released: 1961
- Recorded: April 10, 1958
- Genres: R&B, jazz
- Length: 37:43
- Label: Atlantic
- Producer: Tom Dowd

Ray Charles chronology
Dedicated to You (1961)	Soul Meeting (1961)	Genius + Soul = Jazz (1961)

Milt Jackson chronology
European Concert (1960)	Soul Meeting (1961)	Bags & Trane (1961)

Alternative cover
- compilation CD re-issue

Soul Meeting is a 1961 Atlantic Records album of recordings made by Ray Charles and Milt Jackson in 1957. The album was later re-issued together with the earlier Soul Brothers (1958), on a 2 CD compilation together with other 'bonus' tracks from the same Charles and Jackson recording sessions.

== Reception ==
On release the album was given a rating of 3.5 out of 5 in the February 1963 issue of Down Beat magazine. In a retrospective review for AllMusic, Cub Koda described the music as "bluesy jazz in a laid-back manner".

== Track listing ==
All songs composed by Ray Charles except as indicated.

=== Original LP release ===
LP side A

1. "Hallelujah, I Love Her So" – 5:27
2. "Blue Genius" – 6:38
3. "X-Ray Blues" – 7:01

LP side B

1. "Soul Meeting" (Milt Jackson) – 6:03
2. "Love on My Mind" – 3:45
3. "Bags of Blues" (Jackson) – 8:49

=== Later CD compilation/re-issue ===
CD disc 1

1. "How Long Blues" (Leroy Carr) – 9:16
2. "Cosmic Ray" – 5:23
3. "The Genius After Hours" – 5:24
4. "Charlesville" – 4:55
5. "Bags Of Blues" (Jackson) – 8:50
6. "'Deed I Do" (Walter Hirsch, Fred Rose) – 5:50
7. "Blue Funk" – 8:05

CD disc 2

1. "Soul Brothers" (Quincy Jones) – 9:34
2. "Bag's Guitar Blues" (Jackson) – 6:27
3. "Soul Meeting" (Jackson) – 6:04
4. "Hallelujah, I Love Her So" – 5:29
5. "Blue Genius" – 6:40
6. "X-Ray Blues" – 8:10
7. "Love On My Mind" – 3:46

== Personnel ==
- Ray Charles – vocals, piano, alto saxophone
- Milt Jackson – vibraphone
- Billy Mitchell – tenor saxophone
- Kenny Burrell – guitar
- Oscar Pettiford – bass
- Percy Heath – bass
- Connie Kay – drums
- Art Taylor – drums
- Tom Dowd – engineer

== Other sources ==
- Atlantic Records 1360
- Soul Meeting at allmusic.com
- Soul Meeting at Discogs
