= Soul Brothers =

Studio album by Ray Charles & Milt Jackson
- Released: June 1958
- Recorded: September 12, 1957 (tracks 1–2), and April 10, 1958 (tracks 3–7), in New York City
- Genres: R&B, jazz
- Length: 38:42
- Labels: Atlantic, Studio One
- Producer: Nesuhi Ertegun

Ray Charles chronology
The Great Ray Charles (1957)	Soul Brothers (1958)	Yes Indeed! (1958)

Milt Jackson chronology
The Modern Jazz Quartet Plays No Sun in Venice (1958)	Soul Brothers (1958)	The Modern Jazz Quartet at Music Inn Volume 2 (1959)

alternate release cover
- compilation CD / re-issue

Professional ratings
Review scores
Source	Rating
AllMusic	4/5 stars
DownBeat	3.5/5 stars

Soul Brothers is the third album recorded by Ray Charles and the eleventh album by Milt Jackson, released by Atlantic Records in 1958. The album was later re-issued in a two-CD compilation together with the other Charles–Jackson album Soul Meeting and included additional tracks from the same recording sessions not present on the original LP releases.

== Track listing ==
All songs composed by Ray Charles except where noted.

=== Original LP release ===
Side A

1. "Soul Brothers" (Quincy Jones) – 9:34
2. "How Long, How Long Blues" (Leroy Carr) – 9:15

Side B

3. "Cosmic Ray" – 5:21
4. "Blue Funk" – 8:09
5. "Bag's Guitar Blues" (Milt Jackson) – 6:23 [mono LP release]
6. "'Deed I Do" (Walter Hirsch, Fred Rose) – 5:50 [stereo LP release]

=== CD re-issue/compilation ===
Disc one

1. "How Long, How Long Blues" Leroy Carr – 9:16
2. "Cosmic Ray" – 5:23
3. "The Genius After Hours" – 5:24
4. "Charlesville" – 4:55
5. "Bags of Blues" (Jackson) – 8:50
6. "'Deed I Do" (Hirsch, Rose) – 5:50
7. "Blue Funk" – 8:05

Disc two

1. "Soul Brothers" (Jones) – 9:34
2. "Bag's Guitar Blues" (Jackson) – 6:27
3. "Soul Meeting" (Jackson) – 6:04
4. "Hallelujah, I Love Her" So – 5:29
5. "Blue Genius" – 6:40
6. "X-Ray Blues" – 8:10
7. "Love on My Mind" – 3:45

== Personnel ==
- Ray Charles – piano, alto saxophone
- Milt Jackson – vibraphone, piano, guitar
- Billy Mitchell – tenor saxophone
- Skeeter Best – guitar
- Oscar Pettiford – bass
- Connie Kay – drums

== Production ==
- Tom Dowd – recording engineer
- Marvin Israel – cover design
- Lee Friedlander – photography
