= My Kind of Jazz =

Studio album by Ray Charles
- Released: April 1970
- Recorded: January 1–10, 1970
- Studio: RPM Studios, Los Angeles, California
- Genre: Jazz
- Length: 30:20
- Label: Tangerine
- Producer: Quincy Jones

Ray Charles chronology
Doing His Thing (1969)	My Kind of Jazz (1970)	Love Country Style (1970)

Professional ratings
Review scores
Source	Rating
Allmusic	link

My Kind of Jazz is a 1970 album by Ray Charles.

== Chart performance ==
The album debuted on Billboard magazine's Top LP's chart in the issue dated July 11, 1970, peaking at No. 155 during a two-week run on the chart.

== Track listing ==
1. "Golden Boy" (Charles Strouse, Lee Adams) – 3:34
2. "Booty Butt" (Ray Charles) – 4:11
3. "This Here" (Bobby Timmons) – 4:43
4. "I Remember Clifford" (Benny Golson) – 3:39
5. "Sidewinder" (Lee Morgan) – 3:29
6. "Bluesette" (Toots Thielemans) – 3:22
7. "Pas–Se–O–Ne Blues" (John Anderson) – 4:43
8. "Zig Zag" (Bill Baker) – 4:31
9. "Angel City" (Teddy Edwards) – 4:24
10. "Señor Blues" (Horace Silver) – 5:24

== Personnel ==
- Bobby Bryant, Bill King, Marshall Hunt, Blue Mitchell - trumpet
- Glen Childress, Henry Coker, Joe Randazzo (and Edward Comegys? or Fred Murrell? or David Phelps?) - trombone
- J. Lloyd Miller - alto saxophone, oboe
- Curtis Peagler - alto saxophone
- Andy Ennis, Albert McQueen, Clifford Scott - tenor saxophone
- Leroy Cooper - baritone saxophone
- Ben Martin - guitar
- Edgar Willis - bass
- Ernest Elly - drums
- Teddy Edwards - arranger (track 9 only)

== Charts ==
Chart (1970)	Peak position
US Billboard Top LPs	155
