= Love Country Style =

Studio album by Ray Charles
- Released: June 1970
- Length: 35:25
- Label: ABC/Tangerine
- Producer: Joe Adams

Ray Charles chronology
My Kind of Jazz (1970)	Love Country Style (1970)	Volcanic Action of My Soul (1971)

Professional ratings
Review scores
Source	Rating
AllMusic	2.5/5 stars
Christgau's Record Guide	B

Love Country Style is a studio album by Ray Charles, released in June 1970 on Charles' Tangerine Records label.

== Chart performance ==
The album debuted on Billboard magazine's Top LP's chart in the issue dated August 22, 1970, peaking at No. 192 during a four-week run on the chart.

== Track listing ==
LP side A:

1. "If You Were Mine" (Jimmy Lewis) – 3:47
2. "Ring of Fire" (June Carter Cash, Merle Kilgore) – 3:05
3. "Your Love Is So Doggone Good" (Big Dee Irwin, Rudy Love) – 2:59
4. "Don’t Change On Me" (Eddie Reeves, Jimmy Holiday) – 3:22
5. "Till I Can’t Take It Anymore" (Clyde Otis, Dorian Burton) – 3:27

LP side B:

1. "You’ve Still Got a Place in My Heart" (Leon Payne) – 4:45
2. "I Keep It Hid" (Jimmy Webb) – 3:46
3. "Sweet Memories" (Mickey Newbury) – 3:31
4. "Good Morning Dear" (Mickey Newbury) – 3:31
5. "Show Me the Sunshine" (Buddy Scott, Jimmy Radcliffe) – 3:12

== Personnel ==
- Ray Charles – keyboards, vocals
- Sid Feller – arrangements, conductor
- David T. Walker, Steve Guillory – guitar
- Carol Kaye – electric bass

Technical

- David Braithwaite, Ray Charles Robinson – engineer

== Charts ==
Chart (1970)	Peak position
US Billboard Top LPs	192
