= I'm All Yours Baby =

I’m All Yours Baby!

Studio album by Ray Charles
- Released: February 1969
- Genre: R&B
- Length: 40:05
- Label: ABC/Tangerine
- Producer: Joe Adams

Ray Charles chronology
A Portrait of Ray (1968)	I’m All Yours Baby! (1969)	Doing His Thing (1969)

Professional ratings
Review scores
Source	Rating
Allmusic	link

I'm All Yours Baby! is a studio album by Ray Charles released in 1969 on Charles' Tangerine Records label.

== Chart performance ==
The album debuted on Billboard magazine's Top LP's chart in the issue dated April 5, 1969, peaking at No. 167 during an eleven-week run on the chart.

== Track listing ==
LP side A:

1. "Yours" (Gonzalo Roig, Jack Sherr & Albert Gamse) – 4:00
2. "I Didn't Know What Time It Was" (Richard Rodgers, Lorenz Hart) – 4:58
3. "Love Is Here to Stay" (Ira Gershwin, George Gershwin) – 3:17
4. "Memories of You" (Andy Razaf, Eubie Blake) – 4:25
5. "Till the End of Time" (Buddy Kaye, Ted Mossman) – 2:39

LP side B:

1. "I Had the Craziest Dream" (Harry Warren, Mack Gordon) – 4:19
2. "Someday" (Brian Hooker, Rudolf Friml) – 4:46
3. "Indian Love Call" (Oscar Hammerstein II, Otto Harbach, Rudolf Friml) – 4:31
4. "I Dream of You (More Than You Dream I Do)" (Edna Osser, Marjorie Goetschius) – 3:18
5. "Gloomy Sunday" (Rezső Seress, Sam M. Lewis) – 3:52

== Personnel ==
- Ray Charles – keyboards, vocals
- Sid Feller – arrangements

Technical

- Mark Taylor – engineer
- Daniel Pezza, Henry Epstein – design, cover

== Charts ==
Chart (1969)	Peak position
US Billboard Top LPs	167
