= True Genius =

Box set by Ray Charles
- Released: September 10, 2021
- Recorded: 1959–2004
- Length: 347:30 (CD version); 398:34 (CD version with bonus disc); 90:30 (Sides of Ray)
- Label: Tangerine

True Genius is a box set of material by American musician Ray Charles, first released on September 10, 2021, by Tangerine Records, as a six-CD collection. The set contains 90 remastered tracks by Charles, as well as nine previously unreleased songs, which were recorded live in Stockholm, Sweden, in 1972. The release of True Genius purposely coincided with the 90th anniversary of Charles's year of birth.

The six-CD release was followed by a condensed version of the material, True Genius: Sides of Ray, which was released as a double-disc vinyl album on November 19, 2021. On May 6, 2022, the unearthed recordings of Charles's 1972 Stockholm concert were issued as a standalone release titled Live in Stockholm 1972.

== Background ==
True Genius was compiled by record producer John Burk—who produced Charles's final studio album, Genius Loves Company—and The Ray Charles Foundation, led by Valerie Ervin. During the assembly of True Genius, they discovered previously unreleased recordings of a concert by Charles held in Stockholm, Sweden, in 1972. The nine songs from that concert were included on the CD release of True Genius, and later received a standalone release as Live in Stockholm 1972.

== Release ==
True Genius was first released on September 10, 2021, by Tangerine Records, as a six-CD set with a coffee table-style hardcover book. It was followed by a double-disc vinyl record release, True Genius: Sides of Ray, on November 19, 2021. Live in Stockholm 1972 received a limited edition colored vinyl record release on Record Store Day, on Black Friday in November 2021; this initial vinyl release was limited to 2,000 copies. Live in Stockholm 1972 later received a standard vinyl release on May 6, 2022.

== Critical reception ==
Jon Pareles of The New York Times wrote that "This straightforward, career-spanning compilation covers his early years as he forges his fusion of gospel, swing, blues, country and pop, though for his pivotal 1950s Atlantic singles—"Hallelujah, I Love Her So," "I've Got a Woman" and "What'd I Say"—it swaps in live versions instead of the studio classics. It moves through his decades as an interpreter, when he homed in on the soul within other people's hits, and includes a rambunctious 1972 concert set from Stockholm and latter-day duets with admirers like Willie Nelson, Norah Jones and Billy Joel."

== Track listing ==
=== CD version ===
All tracks are written by Ray Charles, except where indicated.

Disc one
No.	Title	Writer(s)	Length
1.	"Georgia on My Mind"	Hoagy Carmichael, Stuart Gorrell	3:39
2.	"Them That Got"	Ricci Harper	2:49
3.	"Ruby"	Mitchell Parish, Heinz Roemheld	3:54
4.	"Hardhearted Hannah"	Jack Yellen, Bob Bigelow, Charles Bates, and Milton Ager	3:17
5.	"One Mint Julep"	Rudy Toombs	3:06
6.	"I've Got News for You"	Roy Alfred	4:32
7.	"I'm Gonna Move to the Outskirts of Town"	Andy Razaf, Casey Bill Weldon	3:44
8.	"Hit the Road Jack"	Percy Mayfield	1:59
9.	"Unchain My Heart"	Bobby Sharp	2:51
10.	"Baby, It's Cold Outside" (with Betty Carter)	Frank Loesser	4:10
11.	"Hide nor Hair"	Mayfield	3:11
12.	"I Can't Stop Loving You"	Don Gibson	4:15
13.	"You Don't Know Me"	Eddy Arnold, Cindy Walker	3:16
14.	"You Are My Sunshine"	Jimmie Davis, Charles Mitchell	2:59
15.	"Take These Chains from My Heart"	Fred Rose, Hy Heath	2:56
16.	"No One"	Doc Pomus, Mort Shuman	3:10
17.	"Busted"	Harlan Howard	2:36
18.	"That Lucky Old Sun"	Beasley Smith, Haven Gillespie	4:23
19.	"Baby, Don't You Cry"	Buddy Johnson, Ned Washington	2:34
20.	"Smack Dab in the Middle"	Charles E. Calhoun	3:18
21.	"My Heart Cries for You"	Carl Sigman, Percy Faith	2:49
22.	"Cry"	Churchill Kohlman	3:34
Total length:			73:02

Disc two
No.	Title	Writer(s)	Length
1.	"Makin' Whoopie" (Live)	Gus Kahn, Walter Donaldson	6:13
2.	"Hallelujah I Love Her So" (Live)		2:59
3.	"I've Got a Woman" (Live)	Charles, Renald Richard	6:11
4.	"What'd I Say" (Live)		4:32
5.	"I'm a Fool to Care"	Ted Daffan	3:18
6.	"The Cincinnati Kid"	Dorcas Cochran	2:24
7.	"Crying Time"	Buck Owens	2:55
8.	"Together Again"	Owens	2:40
9.	"Let's Go Get Stoned"	Nickolas Ashford, Valerie Simpson, Jo Armstead	2:57
10.	"Please Say You're Fooling"	Bobby Stevenson	2:43
11.	"I Don't Need No Doctor"	Ashford, Simpson, Armstead	2:33
12.	"Here We Go Again"	Don Lanier, Red Steagall	3:16
13.	"Somebody Ought to Write a Book About It"	Jimmy Holiday, Jimmy Lewis, Cliff Chambers	3:07
14.	"In the Heat of the Night"	Quincy Jones, Marilyn Bergman, Alan Bergman	2:35
15.	"Yesterday"	Lennon–McCartney	2:50
16.	"Sweet Young Thing Like You"	Dee Ervin	2:17
17.	"Eleanor Rigby"	Lennon–McCartney	3:00
18.	"If It Wasn't for Bad Luck"	Lewis, Charles	4:45
19.	"I Didn't Know What Time It Was"	Richard Rodgers, Lorenz Hart	4:52
20.	"Let Me Love You"	Holiday	2:48
21.	"I'm Satisfied"	Ashford, Simpson, Armstead	2:30
Total length:			71:25

Disc three
No.	Title	Writer(s)	Length
1.	"We Can Make It"	Lewis	3:42
2.	"Laughin' and Clownin'"	Sam Cooke	3:23
3.	"If You Were Mine"	Lewis	3:51
4.	"Booty Butt"		4:14
5.	"Feel So Bad"	L. Temple, J. Johnson	3:16
6.	"Your Love Is So Doggone Good"	D. Erwin, R. Love	3:03
7.	"Something"	George Harrison	4:04
8.	"America the Beautiful"	Katharine Lee Bates, Samuel A. Ward	3:36
9.	"Look What They've Done to My Song, Ma"		3:43
10.	"There'll Be No Peace Without All Men as One"	Melanie Safka	3:52
11.	"Every Saturday Night"	Aaron Collins	3:22
12.	"Our Suite"	Charles, Roger Neumann	8:07
13.	"I Can Make It Through the Days (But Oh Those Lonely Nights)"	Charles, Ervin, Ruth Robinson	3:55
14.	"Ring of Fire"	June Carter Cash, Merle Kilgore	3:08
15.	"Come Live with Me"	Felice and Boudleaux Bryant	3:24
16.	"Somebody"		4:06
17.	"Till There Was You"	Meredith Willson	4:10
Total length:			66:56

Disc four
No.	Title	Writer(s)	Length
1.	"Living for the City"	Stevie Wonder	6:04
2.	"It Ain't Easy Being Green"	Joe Raposo	4:14
3.	"3/4 Time"	Tony Joe White	2:50
4.	"Summertime" (with Cleo Laine)	George Gershwin, DuBose Heyward, Ira Gershwin	6:15
5.	"Take Me Home Country Roads" (Live)	Bill Danoff, Taffy Nivert, John Denver	4:32
6.	"Am I Blue" (Live)	Harry Akst, Grant Clarke	6:57
7.	"I Can See Clearly Now"	Johnny Nash	4:25
8.	"How Long Has This Been Going On"	G. Gershwin, I. Gershwin	5:21
9.	"Let It Be"	Lennon–McCartney	3:32
10.	"Is There Anyone Out There?"	Guy Fletcher, Doug Flett	5:57
11.	"Drift Away"	Mentor Williams	3:46
12.	"Blues in the Night"	Harold Arlen, Johnny Mercer	7:39
13.	"3/4 Time"		4:23
14.	"Compared to What"	Gene McDaniels	4:23
Total length:			70:18

Disc five
No.	Title	Writer(s)	Length
1.	"Do I Ever Cross Your Mind"	Billy Burnette and Michael Smotherman	3:50
2.	"Two Old Cats Like Us" (with Hank Williams Jr.)	Troy Seals	2:37
3.	"Seven Spanish Angels" (with Willie Nelson)	Seals, Eddie Setser	3:50
4.	"Anybody with the Blues Knows"		3:30
5.	"Baby Grand" (with Billy Joel)	Billy Joel	4:05
6.	"Stranger in My Own Home Town" (with Kenny Carr)	Mayfield	3:20
7.	"Save the Bones for Henry Jones" (with Lou Rawls and Milt Jackson)	Danny Barker, Vernon Lee	3:42
8.	"Ellie My Love"	Keisuke Kuwata	4:13
9.	"I'll Be Good to You" (with Quincy Jones and Chaka Khan)	George Johnson, Louis Johnson, Sonora Sam	4:57
10.	"A Song for You"	Leon Russell	4:16
11.	"Still Crazy After All These Years"	Paul Simon	5:00
12.	"If I Could"	Ken Hirsch, Ron Miller, Marti Sharron	4:55
13.	"None of Us Are Free" (with Eric Clapton)	Barry Mann, Cynthia Weil, Brenda Russell	5:05
14.	"Imagine"	John Lennon, Yoko Ono	4:28
15.	"Here We Go Again" (with Norah Jones)	Lanier, Steagall	3:58
16.	"The Long and Winding Road" (with Count Basie Orchestra)	Lennon–McCartney	4:03
Total length:			65:49

Bonus disc: Live in Stockholm, 1972
No.	Title	Writer(s)	Length
1.	"Alexander's Ragtime Band" (Live)	Irving Berlin	2:34
2.	"What'd I Say" (Live)		4:04
3.	"I've Had My Fun" (Live)	Jimmy Ogden	7:04
4.	"Raelettes Introduction" (Live)		1:16
5.	"Games People Play" (Live)	Joe South	5:40
6.	"Don't Change On Me" (Live)	Eddie Reeves, Holiday	3:24
7.	"I Can't Stop Loving You" (Live)	Don Gibson	4:01
8.	"Marie" (Live)	Irving Berlin	1:45
9.	"I've Got a Woman" (Live)	Charles, Renald Richard	8:46
Total length:			38:34

=== Vinyl version (Sides of Ray) ===
All tracks are written by Ray Charles, except where indicated.

Side One – Soul
No.	Title	Writer(s)	Length
1.	"Hit the Road Jack"	Mayfield	1:59
2.	"I Don't Need No Doctor"	Ashford, Simpson, Armstead	2:33
3.	"Unchain My Heart"	Sharp	2:51
4.	"No One"	Pomus, Shuman	3:10
5.	"Hide nor Hair"	Mayfield	3:11
6.	"I've Got a Woman" (Live)	Charles, Renald Richard	6:11
Total length:			19:55

Side Two – Jazz & Blues
No.	Title	Writer(s)	Length
1.	"Let's Go Get Stoned"	Ashford, Simpson, Armstead	2:57
2.	"I'm Gonna Move to the Outskirts of Town"	Razaf, Weldon	3:44
3.	"Smack Dab in the Middle"	Calhoun	3:18
4.	"Them That Got"	Harper	2:49
5.	"One Mint Julep"	Toombs	3:06
6.	"I've Got News for You"	Alfred	4:32
Total length:			20:26

Side Three – Country
No.	Title	Writer(s)	Length
1.	"Here We Go Again"	Lanier, Steagall	3:16
2.	"You Are My Sunshine"	Davis, Mitchell	2:59
3.	"Crying Time"	Owens	2:55
4.	"Take These Chains from My Heart"	Rose, Heath	2:56
5.	"Ring of Fire"	Cash, Kilgore	3:08
6.	"I Can't Stop Loving You"	Gibson	4:15
Total length:			19:29

Side Four – Pop Classics
No.	Title	Writer(s)	Length
1.	"Georgia on My Mind"	Carmichael, Gorrell	3:39
2.	"Eleanor Rigby"	Lennon–McCartney	3:00
3.	"Busted"	Howard	2:36
4.	"Till There Was You"	Willson	4:10
5.	"Hallelujah I Love Her So" (Live)		2:59
6.	"A Song for You"	Russell	4:16
Total length:			20:40

== Charts ==
=== Monthly charts ===
Monthly chart performance for True Genius
Chart (2025)	Peak position
German Jazz Albums (Offizielle Top 100)	14
