= Anthology (Ray Charles album) =

Greatest hits album by Ray Charles
- Released: 1988
- Recorded: 1960–1972
- Genre: R&B; soul; jazz; piano blues
- Length: 67:25 (original), 66:18 (re-release)
- Label: Rhino
- Producer: Ray Charles; Steve Hoffman; Richard Foos

Ray Charles chronology
Just Between Us (1988)	Anthology (1988)	Would You Believe? (1990)

Posthumous cover

Professional ratings
Review scores
Source	Rating
AllMusic	4.5/5 stars

Anthology is the first compact disc to collect many of soul music icon Ray Charles' ABC-Paramount-era recordings. AllMusic considers it to be "the best single CD collection of Ray Charles' '60s and '70s ABC-Paramount material", while Rhino Records, the issuing label, refers to it in the liner notes as "the compact disc edition of Ray Charles' Greatest Hits", alluding to the two Rhino LPs issued the same year. It is one of the first CDs to be released by Rhino.

Charles, who retained the master rights (currently controlled by his estate since his June 2004 passing) to his ABC-Paramount recordings, supervised a remixing of the 20 songs on this compilation especially for this recording with mastering engineer Steve Hoffman, while Rhino chairman Richard Foos helped select and sequence the tracks for the CD.

While the CD is culled entirely from Charles' ABC-Paramount recordings, his Atlantic Records period is represented by three live recordings of "What'd I Say", "I Got a Woman", and "Hallelujah I Love Her So" from the 1965 concert recording Ray Charles Live In Concert.

The album was repackaged with a new cover after Charles' death. The original release included the song "Sticks and Stones"; this was substituted for "America the Beautiful" on subsequent releases.

== Track listing ==
Original release

1. "Hit the Road Jack" (Percy Mayfield)
2. "Georgia on My Mind" (Stuart Gorrell/Hoagy Carmichael)
3. "Let's Go Get Stoned" (Nick Ashford/Valerie Simpson/Jo Armstead)
4. "I Don't Need No Doctor" (Nick Ashford/Valerie Simpson/Jo Armstead)
5. "Hallelujah I Love Her So" (1965 live version) (Ray Charles)
6. "One Mint Julep" (Rudy Toombs)
7. "That Lucky Old Sun" (Haven Gillespie/Harry Beasley Smith)
8. "Unchain My Heart" (Teddy Powell/Bobby Sharp)
9. "Don't Set Me Free" (Teddy Powell)
10. "I Can't Stop Loving You" (Don Gibson)
11. "Busted" (Harlan Howard)
12. "Crying Time" (Buck Owens)
13. "Cry" (Churchill Kohlman)
14. "What'd I Say" (1965 live version) (Ray Charles)
15. "Here We Go Again" (Don Lanier/Red Steagall)
16. "Sticks and Stones" (Titus Turner)
17. "I Got a Woman" (1965 live version) (Ray Charles)
18. "Eleanor Rigby" (John Lennon/Paul McCartney)
19. "You Are My Sunshine" (Jimmie Davis/Charles Mitchell)
20. "Born to Lose" (Ted Daffan)

Re-release

1. "Hit the Road Jack" (Percy Mayfield)
2. "Georgia on My Mind" (Stuart Gorrell/Hoagy Carmichael)
3. "Let's Go Get Stoned" (Nick Ashford/Valerie Simpson/Jo Armstead)
4. "I Don't Need No Doctor" (Nick Ashford/Valerie Simpson/Jo Armstead)
5. "Hallelujah I Love Her So" (1965 live version) (Ray Charles)
6. "One Mint Julep" (Rudy Toombs)
7. "That Lucky Old Sun" (Haven Gillespie/Harry Beasley Smith)
8. "Unchain My Heart" (Teddy Powell/Bobby Sharp)
9. "Don't Set Me Free" (Teddy Powell)
10. "I Can't Stop Loving You" (Don Gibson)
11. "Busted" (Harlan Howard)
12. "Crying Time" (Buck Owens)
13. "Cry" (Churchill Kohlman)
14. "What'd I Say" (1965 live version) (Ray Charles)
15. "Here We Go Again" (Don Lanier/Red Steagall)
16. "I Got a Woman" (1965 live version) (Ray Charles)
17. "Eleanor Rigby" (John Lennon/Paul McCartney)
18. "You Are My Sunshine" (Jimmie Davis/Charles Mitchell)
19. "Born to Lose" (Ted Daffan)
20. "America the Beautiful" (Katharine Lee Bates/Samuel Ward)

== Certifications and sales ==
Region	Certification	Certified units/sales
United States (RIAA)	Gold	500,000^{^}
^{^} Shipments figures based on certification alone.
