= Here We Go Again: Celebrating the Genius of Ray Charles =

2011 live album by Willie Nelson and Wynton Marsalis

Here We Go Again

Live album Celebrating the Genius of Ray Charles by Willie Nelson and Wynton Marsalis featuring Norah Jones
- Released: March 29, 2011
- Recorded: February 9–10, 2009
- Venues: Rose Theater, New York City
- Genres: Jazz, country
- Length: 61:49
- Label: Blue Note

Willie Nelson chronology
Country Music (2010)	Here We Go Again (2011)	Remember Me, Vol. 1 (2011)

Wynton Marsalis chronology
Vitoria Suite (2010)	Here We Go Again (2011)	Play the Blues (2011)

Norah Jones chronology
... Featuring Norah Jones (2010)	Here We Go Again (2011)	Rome (2011)

Here We Go Again: Celebrating the Genius of Ray Charles is a live tribute album by country singer Willie Nelson and jazz trumpeter Wynton Marsalis. It was recorded during concerts at the Rose Theater in New York City, on February 9 and 10, 2009. The album received mixed reviews, in which the instrumentation of Marsalis' orchestra was praised by the critics.

== Background and recording ==
Nelson and Marsalis played together for the first time in 2007 at The Allen Room in Lincoln Center, which resulted in the critically acclaimed album Two Men with the Blues, released the next year. The album held the number one position in the Billboard Jazz Albums chart for four weeks. Nelson and Marsalis joined again in 2009 along with Norah Jones for a series of two concerts, at the Rose Theater, on February 9 and February 10. The recordings were released on March 29, 2011.

== Reception ==
Professional ratings
Aggregate scores
Source	Rating
Metacritic	(63/100)
Review scores
Source	Rating
AllMusic	3.5/5 stars
The Austin Chronicle	2/5 stars
The Daily Telegraph	4/5 stars
The Jazz Line	4/5 stars
Los Angeles Times	3/4 stars
The New Zealand Herald	3.5/5 stars
PopMatters	7/10
Rolling Stone	2.5/5 stars

The Los Angeles Times's music critic rated the release with three stars out of four, and wrote: "Ray Charles surely would have admired the inventive and lively jazz-drenched arrangements accompanying many of his standards, including "Hit the Road Jack," "Busted," "Hallelujah I Love Her So," "Unchain My Heart" and "Cryin' Time." Rolling Stone praised Nelson and Jones' duet on Buck Owens' "Crying Time", but criticized the abundance of solos between Nelson and Marsalis' band: "(Here We Go Again) feels like a missed opportunity. Nelson's nylon-stabbing guitar is too scarce here, giving way to Marsalis' jazz band, a slick cast that rotates solos exhaustively." The Texas Monthly also criticized the arrangements: "applying Willie's offhand cool and Jones's trademark reserve to the genius's hits, particularly his blistering soul classics, makes about as much sense as asking Tony Bennett to cover the Butthole Surfers [...] Here We Go Again is full of arrangements that take the wrong fork in the road. The expert musicianship of Marsalis's working band overthinks and dulls down almost every tune."

The Daily Telegraph rated it with four stars out of five. Praising Nelson, Marsalis and Jones as well as the backing band, the critic stated "They have done Ray Charles proud". Meanwhile, The Austin Chronicle rated the album with two stars out of five; critic Jay Trachtenberg wrote: "Despite boasting favorites from Charles repertoire including "Cryin' Time," "Busted," and "Hit the Road Jack," this summit never clicks, perhaps a result of the one-off nature of the project making it hard for the musical personalities to fully gel". The New Zealand Herald wrote: "While they may seem like a funny couple, with the deft precision and style of Marsalis seemingly at odds with Nelson's more unkempt delivery, it actually works".

AllMusic wrote: "With Charles' standards like "Hallelujah I Love Her So", "Cryin' Time", "Hit the Road Jack", "Busted", "Makin' Whoopie", and his iconic signature hit, "What'd I Say" all sounding comfortable and fresh. The only thing missing is Ray Charles himself, who undoubtedly would have had no trouble fitting into these shows. Radio now splits everything into little niches. That isn't what Charles was about. He saw music as convergence. This fine concert album plays in that same spirit".

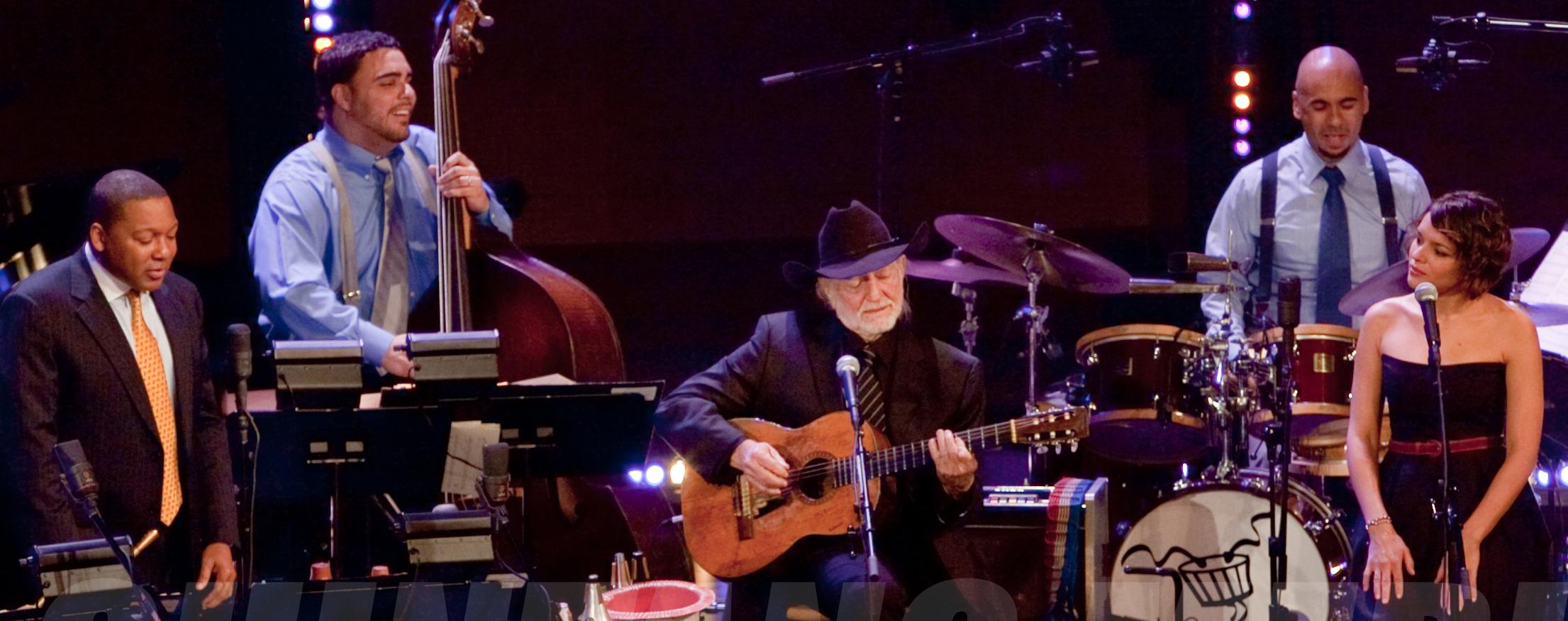
(L-R) Wynton Marsalis, Willie Nelson and Norah Jones during a tour to promote Two Men with the Blues

PopMatters delivered a mixed review, praising the team of Nelson, Marsalis and Jones, but criticizing the performance of the songs, indicating that they consisted only of an all-star lineup that did not apply a new perspective to Charles' recordings: "the whole never really rises above the sum of its parts, and no one ever tries to teach us something new about these tunes. [...] Not that hearing these voices on great tunes doesn't thrill. It does. [...] What's missing is some element of risk or sacrifice".

BBC Music wrote a mixed review, remarking that

"Marsalis and company don't exactly hit the bull's-eye every time on this recording of the event. And what's most apparent, sadly, is that Nelson's vocal deficiencies grow more obvious every year. Some might argue that his weathered voice has gained in character what it has lost in strength and range, but my ears tell me otherwise [...] On the plus side, the Marsalis band compensates quite adequately for occasional lacklustre vocals, navigating the various nooks and crannies of Charles' eclectic songbook with just the right combination of jazz and pop smarts. [...] Thanks largely to the instrumental work, there’s a satisfying amount of entertainment value on this release – even if major revelations are not forthcoming."

The review also noted that, while Jones added "style and panache" to both jazz ("Come Rain or Come Shine", "Makin' Whoopee") and country ("Here We Go Again") songs, she sat out most rhythm and blues songs.

== Track listing ==
No.	Title	Writer(s)	Length
1.	"Hallelujah I Love Her So"	Ray Charles	4:54
2.	"Come Rain or Come Shine" (featuring Norah Jones)	Harold Arlen, Johnny Mercer	3:52
3.	"Unchain My Heart"	Teddy Powell, Bobby Sharp	5:35
4.	"Cryin' Time" (featuring Norah Jones)	Buck Owens	4:32
5.	"Losing Hand"	Charles Calhoun	5:16
6.	"Hit the Road Jack" (featuring Norah Jones)	Percy Mayfield	7:45
7.	"I'm Moving On"	Hank Snow	5:44
8.	"Busted"	Harlan Howard	3:52
9.	"Here We Go Again" (featuring Norah Jones)	Don Lanier, Red Steagall	5:10
10.	"Makin' Whoopee" (featuring Norah Jones)	Gus Kahn, Walter Donaldson	4:54
11.	"I Love You So Much It Hurts"	Floyd Tillman	2:52
12.	"What'd I Say" (featuring Norah Jones)	Ray Charles	6:11

A Barnes & Noble-exclusive edition has three bonus tracks: "You Don't Know Me" (4:45), "You Are My Sunshine" (6:26), and "That's All" (6:04).

== Personnel ==
Musicians

- Willie Nelson – guitar (1–9, 12), vocals (1, 3–9, 11, 12)
- Wynton Marsalis – trumpet, arranger, vocals (6, 8, 12)
- Norah Jones – vocals (2, 4, 6, 9, 10, 12)
- Dan Nimmer – piano
- Carlos Henríquez – bass
- Walter Blanding – tenor saxophone, vocals (6)
- Mickey Raphael – harmonica
- Ali Jackson – drums, percussion
- Arrangements by Sherman Irby (1), Richard DeRosa (2, 10), Victor Goines (3, 4), Jackson (5), Vincent Gardner (6), Marsalis (7, 11), Christopher Crenshaw (8) and Andy Farber (9, 12)
- Music supervised by Christianna English and Kay Niewood
- Music copyists were Geoff Burke, Jonathan Kelly and Kate Sain

Production

- Jeff Jones – producer, engineer (mixing, mastering)
- Jazz at Lincoln Center – producer
- Mark Rothbaum – executive producer
- Saundra Palmer-Grassi – engineer (recording)
- Rob Macomber – engineer (recording)
- Gordon H. Lee – creative direction
- Randall Leddy – art direction, design
- Darren Booth – typography

== Chart performance ==
Chart	Peak position
Billboard Jazz Albums	2
Alben Top 75 (Austria)	40
