= Ray Charles Invites You to Listen =

Studio album by Ray Charles
- Released: June 1967
- Length: 39:26
- Label: ABC / Tangerine
- Producer: Joe Adams

Ray Charles chronology
Ray's Moods (1966)	Ray Charles Invites You to Listen (1967)	A Portrait of Ray (1968)

Singles from Ray Charles Invites You to Listen
- 1. "Here We Go Again" Released: May 1967; 2. "Yesterday" Released: November 1967

Ray Charles Invites You to Listen (sometimes referred to as Invites You to Listen or Listen) is a studio album by American recording artist Ray Charles, released in June 1967. Made up of several standards, the album had Charles experiment with falsetto. The album received mixed response from music critics, some noting that the style of music was "old fashioned".

== Background and composition ==
As Ray Charles' 1967 greatest hits album, A Man and His Soul, was released, he returned to the recording studio to begin work on Ray Charles Invites You to Listen. The album was produced by Joe Adams. Charles used falsetto on the album "for no other reason than self-satisfaction". Ray Charles Invites You to Listen consists mostly of standards. Sid Feller chose ten songs for the album, and wrote their arrangements. A big band provided instrumentation for two of the songs, while the others were backed with fourteen string instruments, eight brass instruments, guitar, bass and drums; Feller conducted the strings, and Adams engineered the record. Ray Charles Invites You to Listen contains a cover version of The Beatles' "Yesterday"; Charles purposely recorded the song with a hoarse voice so that the title lyric sounded as "yeshh-terday". Charles also re-recorded Jule Styne's "People" with a trombone vamp.

== Singles ==
"Yesterday" and "Here We Go Again" were released as singles in 1967.

== Critical reception ==
Professional ratings
Review scores
Source	Rating
AllMusic	3/5 stars
DownBeat	1/5 stars

Author Mike Evans wrote that Ray Charles Invites You to Listen is "one of the most remarkable recordings of his career". The use of falsetto received a mixed response from critics; it was called "grating and unpleasant" by DownBeat's Carol Sloane (who also described Feller's arrangements as "vapid," and Charles' performance on the whole as "lack[ing in] depth and feeling"), while others praised its femininity.

== Track listing ==
1. "She's Funny That Way (I Got a Woman Crazy for Me)" (Neil Moret, Richard Whiting) – 4:53
2. "How Deep Is the Ocean (How High Is the Sky)" (Irving Berlin) – 3:58
3. "You Made Me Love You (I Didn't Wanna Do It)" (James V. Monaco, Joseph McCarthy) – 3:20
4. "Yesterday" (John Lennon, Paul McCartney) – 2:48
5. "I'll Be Seeing You" (Irving Kahal, Sammy Fain) – 5:34
6. "Here We Go Again" (Don Lanier, Red Steagall) – 3:17
7. "All for You" (Robert Scherman) – 5:05
8. "Love Walked In" (George Gershwin, Ira Gershwin) – 4:26
9. "Gee, Baby, Ain't I Good to You" (Andy Razaf, Don Redman) – 2:56
10. "People" (Bob Merrill, Jule Styne) – 5:09

== Charts ==
Chart	Peak position
US Billboard 200	76
US Hot R&B LPs	9
US Jazz Albums	11

== Bibliography ==
- Evans, Mike (2005). Ray Charles: The Birth of Soul. Omnibus Press. ISBN 978-1-84449-764-5.
- Lydon, Michael (2004) [First published 1998]. Ray Charles: Man and Music. Routledge. ISBN 978-0-415-97043-3.
- Hubbard-Brown, Janet (2008). Ray Charles: Musician. Infobase Publishing. ISBN 1-60413-001-6.
