= My Woman, My Woman, My Wife (Dean Martin album) =

- Cover art by Bernie Fuchs

Studio album by Dean Martin
- Released: 1970
- Recorded: 1970
- Genres: Traditional pop, country
- Length: 28:41
- Labels: Reprise; RS 6403
- Producer: Jimmy Bowen

Dean Martin chronology
I Take a Lot of Pride in What I Am (1969)	My Woman, My Woman, My Wife (1970)	For the Good Times (1971)

My Woman, My Woman, My Wife is the twenty-eighth studio album by Dean Martin, arranged by John Bahler, Glen D. Hardin and Billy Strange.

== Overview ==
Recorded right after the hit single with the same name, the album peaked at 97 on the Billboard 200 and at 92 on the Australian Kent Music Report. It was reissued on CD by Capitol Records in 2006 and Hip-O Records in 2009. Martin was recording infrequently at this stage of his career, recording for only two days every spring to produce a new album and otherwise recording an occasional singles session.

== Advertisement ==
My Woman, My Woman, My Wife was advertised by Reprise Records as Martin's open letter to the Women's liberation movement. The advert ended with the statement "Take that, ladies".

== Reception ==
Professional ratings
Review scores
Source	Rating
Allmusic	2.5/5 stars

The initial Billboard review from 22 August 1970 commented that "Martin has everything going for him".

William Ruhlmann on Allmusic.com gave the album two and a half stars out of five. Ruhlmann criticized Martin's lack of emotional commitment to the lyrics of the title song, and of Bowen and Martin's collaboration adds that "Martin obliged, and Bowen provided his usual Nashville sound-style production. But this was nothing the two hadn't done many times before, and record buyers were losing interest".

== Track listing ==
Side One:

1. "My Woman, My Woman, My Wife" (Marty Robbins) – 3:30
2. "Once a Day" (Bill Anderson) – 2:44
3. "Here We Go Again" (Don Lanier, Red Steagall) – 3:07
4. "Make the World Go Away" (Hank Cochran) – 2:47
5. "The Tip of My Fingers" (Bill Anderson) – 2:28

Side Two:

1. "Detroit City" (Danny Dill, Mel Tillis) – 3:43
2. "Together Again" (Buck Owens) – 2:32
3. "Heart Over Mind" (Mel Tillis) – 2:44
4. "Turn the World Around" (Ben Peters) – 2:24
5. "It Keeps Right On a-Hurtin''" (Johnny Tillotson) – 2:42

== Personnel ==
- Dean Martin – vocals
- John Bahler – arranger
- Glen D. Hardin
- Billy Strange
- Ed Thrasher – art direction
- Eddie Brackett – engineer
- Chuck Britz
- Jimmy Bowen – record producer
