= Nancy (Nancy Sinatra album) =

Studio album by Nancy Sinatra
- Released: 1969
- Genre: Pop
- Length: 50:11
- Label: Reprise
- Producer: Billy Strange

Nancy Sinatra chronology
Country, My Way (1967)	Nancy (1969)	Woman (1972)

Professional ratings
Review scores
Source	Rating
AllMusic	2.5/5 stars

Nancy is the sixth studio album by Nancy Sinatra, released on Reprise Records in 1969. It peaked at number 91 on the Billboard 200 chart.

== Track listing ==
No.	Title	Writer(s)	Length
1.	"God Knows I Love You"	Delaney Bramlett, Mac Davis	3:09
2.	"Memories"	Billy Strange, Mac Davis	3:42
3.	"Just Bein' Plain Old Me"	Lawrence Castleman	3:35
4.	"Here We Go Again"	Donny Lanier, Red Steagall	3:09
5.	"My Dad (My Pa)"	Herbert Martin, Michael Leonard	2:34
6.	"Light My Fire"	Jim Morrison, John Densmore, Ray Manzarek, Robby Krieger	3:05
7.	"Big Boss Man"	Al Smith, Willie Dixon	5:01
8.	"My Mother's Eyes"	Abel Baer, Wolfe Gilbert	3:26
9.	"I'm Just in Love"	Scott Davis	3:23
10.	"Son of a Preacher Man"	John Hurley, Ronnie Wilkins	2:49
11.	"Long Time Woman"	Bob Lind	3:22
12.	"For Once in My Life"	Orlando Murden, Ronald Miller	2:50

1996 reissue edition bonus tracks
No.	Title	Writer(s)	Length
13.	"Nice 'n' Easy"	Alan and Marilyn Bergman, Lew Spence	2:04
14.	"Old Devil Moon"	Burton Lane, Yip Harburg	1:52
15.	"Happy"	Lee Hazlewood	2:29
16.	"Home"	Mac Davis	3:41

== Personnel ==
Credits adapted from liner notes.

- Nancy Sinatra – vocals
- The Blossoms – backing vocals
- B. J. Baker Singers – backing vocals
- Sid Sharp – strings
- Roy Caton – trumpet
- Jim Horn – flute
- Don Randi – piano
- Red Rhodes – pedal steel guitar
- Al Casey – guitar
- Jerry McGee – guitar
- Chuck Berghofer – double bass
- Carol Kaye – bass guitar
- Jerry Scheff – bass guitar
- Hal Blaine – drums
- Billy Strange – production
- Les Taylor – orchestration

== Charts ==
Chart	Peak position
US Billboard 200	91
