= ... Featuring Norah Jones =

...Featuring Norah Jones

Compilation album by Norah Jones
- Released: November 12, 2010
- Recorded: 2001–2010
- Length: 71:15
- Label: Blue Note

Norah Jones chronology
The Fall (2009)	...Featuring Norah Jones (2010)	Here We Go Again (2011)

Professional ratings
Aggregate scores
Source	Rating
Metacritic	68/100
Review scores
Source	Rating
AllMusic	3.5/5 stars
Billboard	73/100
Clash	5/10 stars
Entertainment Weekly	B
Los Angeles Times	3/4 stars
Now	2/5 stars
Paste	7.2/10
PopMatters	5/10 stars
Slant Magazine	3.5/5 stars
Uncut	4/5 stars

...Featuring Norah Jones is a compilation album by American singer Norah Jones that was released on November 16, 2010, by Blue Note Records. The album includes songs by other artists on which Jones is featured, including songs by her side bands The Little Willies and El Madmo. The album includes "Here We Go Again", a duet with Ray Charles, which won the Grammy Award for Record of the Year in 2005. The song "Little Lou, Ugly Jack, Prophet John" by Belle & Sebastian had only been released one month prior to the release of this album on the group's October 2010 album Belle and Sebastian Write About Love.

== Track listing ==
#	Song title	Artist	Previously released on	Length
1	"Love Me"	The Little Willies	The Little Willies	3:51
2	"Virginia Moon" (feat. Norah Jones)	Foo Fighters	In Your Honor	3:51
3	"Turn Them" (feat. Norah Jones)	Sean Bones	Rings	4:03
4	"Baby, It's Cold Outside" (feat. Norah Jones)	Willie Nelson	American Classic	3:58
5	"Bull Rider (feat. Sasha Dobson)"	Norah Jones	iTunes Originals	2:59
6	"Ruler of My Heart" (feat. Norah Jones)	Dirty Dozen Brass Band	Medicated Magic	2:59
7	"The Best Part"	El Madmo	El Madmo	3:25
8	"Take Off Your Cool" (feat. Norah Jones)	OutKast	Speakerboxxx/The Love Below	2:38
9	"Life Is Better" (feat. Norah Jones)	Q-Tip	The Renaissance	4:27
10	"Soon the New Day" (feat. Norah Jones)	Talib Kweli	Eardrum	4:04
11	"Little Lou, Ugly Jack, Prophet John" (feat. Norah Jones)	Belle & Sebastian	Belle & Sebastian Write About Love	4:25
12	"Here We Go Again" (feat. Norah Jones)	Ray Charles	Genius Loves Company	3:59
13	"Loretta" (feat. Gillian Welch & David Rawlings)	Norah Jones	Live in 2004	3:16
14	"Dear John" (feat. Norah Jones)	Ryan Adams	Jacksonville City Nights	4:36
15	"Creepin' In" (feat. Dolly Parton)	Norah Jones	Feels like Home	3:00
16	"Court & Spark" (feat. Norah Jones)	Herbie Hancock	River: The Joni Letters	7:36
17	"More than This" (feat. Norah Jones)	Charlie Hunter	Songs from the Analog Playground	4:11
18	"Blue Bayou" (feat. M. Ward) (Live in Austin)	Norah Jones	Live from Austin	3:43
19	"I Got It Bad (And That Ain't Good)" (feat. Norah Jones) [amazon.com MP3 download]	Dayna Kurtz	Beautiful Yesterday	
20	"Any Other Day" (feat. Norah Jones) [Japan CD bonus track and amazon.co.jp MP3 download]	Wyclef Jean	Carnival Vol. II: Memoirs of an Immigrant	

== Charts ==
=== Weekly charts ===
Chart (2010–2011)	Peak position
Australian Albums (ARIA)	16
Belgian Albums (Ultratop Flanders)	35
Belgian Albums (Ultratop Wallonia)	51
Canadian Albums (Billboard)	20
Dutch Albums (Album Top 100)	57
European Top 100 Albums	33
Finnish Albums (Suomen virallinen lista)	47
French Albums (SNEP)	54
German Albums (Offizielle Top 100)	55
Greek Albums (IFPI)	18
Italian Albums (FIMI)	28
Japanese Albums (Oricon)	10
Mexican Albums (AMPROFON)	46
New Zealand Albums (RMNZ)	21
Norwegian Albums (VG-lista)	40
Portuguese Albums (AFP)	12
Spanish Albums (Promusicae)	18
Swedish Albums (Sverigetopplistan)	27
Swiss Albums (Schweizer Hitparade)	13
UK Jazz & Blues Albums (Official Charts)	4
US Billboard 200	29

=== Year-end charts ===
Chart (2011)	Position
US Billboard 200	168

== Certifications ==
Region	Certification	Certified units/sales
Canada (Music Canada)	Gold	40,000^{^}
Poland (ZPAV)	Gold	10,000^{*}
^{*} Sales figures based on certification alone.^{^} Shipments figures based on certification alone.
