= A Man and His Soul =

Compilation album by Ray Charles
- Released: 1967
- Recorded: Various
- Genre: Rhythm and blues, soul
- Length: 79:29
- Label: ABC 590

Professional ratings
Review scores
Source	Rating
Allmusic link	3/5 stars

A Man and His Soul is a 1967 compilation of studio and live performances by Ray Charles. The LP version includes an album size booklet containing biographical information, photos, and details on his recordings.

== Track listing ==
Side 1

1. "I Can't Stop Loving You" (Don Gibson) – 4:13
2. "What'd I Say" [Live] (Ray Charles) – 4:30
3. "Ol' Man River" (Jerome Kern, Oscar Hammerstein) – 5:33
4. "One Mint Julep" (Randolph Toombs) – 3:02
5. "Crying Time" (Buck Owens) – 2:54
6. "Makin' Whoopee" [Live] (Gus Kahn, Walter Donaldson) – 2:16

Side 2

1. "Busted" (Harlan Howard) – 2:06
2. "Takes Two to Tango" (Al Hoffman, Dick Manning) – 3:17
3. "Ruby" (Mitchell Parish, Heinz Roemheld) – 3:51
4. "Let's Go Get Stoned" (Nickolas Ashford, Valerie Simpson, Josie Armstead) – 2:57
5. "Cry" (Churchill Kohlman) – 3:31
6. "Unchain My Heart" (A. Jones, F. James)> – 2:52

Side 3

1. "Georgia on My Mind" (Stuart Gorrell, Hoagy Carmichael) – 3:37
2. "Baby, It's Cold Outside" (Frank Loesser) – 4:05
3. "Worried Mind" (Jimmie Davis, Ted Daffan) – 2.54
4. "I Chose to Sing the Blues" (Jimmy Holiday, Charles) – 2:28
5. "I Don't Need No Doctor" (Ashford, Simpson) – 2:29
6. "Born to Lose" (Frankie Brown) – 3:15

Side 4

1. "Hit the Road Jack" (Percy Mayfield) – 2:00
2. "You Are My Sunshine" (Jimmie Davis, Charles Mitchell) – 2:58
3. "From the Heart" (Charles) – 3:30
4. "Teardrops from My Eyes" (Toombs) – 3:22
5. "No Use Crying" (Roy Gaines, Johnny B. Daniels, Freddy Kober) – 3:15
6. "Chitlin's With Canned Yams" (Charles) – 4:34

== Certifications and sales ==
Region	Certification	Certified units/sales
United States (RIAA)	Gold	500,000^{^}
^{^} Shipments figures based on certification alone.
