= Kenneth Carr =

Kenneth Carr may refer to:

- Kenny Carr (born 1955), American basketball player
- Kenneth Monroe Carr (1925–2015), chairman of the Nuclear Regulatory Commission
- Kenny Carr (guitarist), American jazz guitarist
