= Here We Go Again (Ray Charles song) =

1967 single by Ray Charles

- "Here We Go Again" 7-inch single cover art

Single by Ray Charles

from the album Ray Charles Invites You to Listen
- B-side: "Somebody Ought to Write a Book About It"
- Released: May 1967
- Recorded: 1967
- Studio: RPM International (Los Angeles)
- Length: 3:18
- Label: ABC/Tangerine
- Songwriters: Don Lanier, Red Steagall
- Producer: Joe Adams

Ray Charles singles chronology
"Please Say You're Fooling" (1966)	"Here We Go Again" (1967)	"In the Heat of the Night" (1967)

"Here We Go Again" is a country music standard written by Don Lanier and Red Steagall that first became notable as a single by Ray Charles from his 1967 album Ray Charles Invites You to Listen. It was produced by Joe Adams for ABC Records/Tangerine Records. To date, this version of the song has been the biggest commercial success, spending twelve consecutive weeks on the US Billboard Hot 100 chart, peaking at number 15.

The most notable cover version is a duet by Charles and Norah Jones, which appeared on the 2004 album Genius Loves Company. This version has been the biggest critical success. After Genius Loves Company was released, "Here We Go Again" earned Grammy Awards for Record of the Year and Best Pop Collaboration at the 47th Grammy Awards in February 2005, posthumously for Charles, who died before the album's release. Another notable version by Nancy Sinatra charted for five weeks in 1969. Johnny Duncan charted the song on Billboard's Hot Country Songs chart for five weeks in 1972, while Roy Clark did so for seven weeks in 1982.

The song has been covered in a wide variety of musical genres. In total, five different versions have been listed on the music charts. Although its two most successful versions have been rhythm and blues recordings, many of its other notable covers were featured on country music albums. "Here We Go Again" was first covered in an instrumental jazz format, and many of the more recent covers have been sung as duets, such as one with Willie Nelson and Norah Jones with Wynton Marsalis accompanying. The song was released on their 2011 tribute album Here We Go Again: Celebrating the Genius of Ray Charles. The song lent its name to Red Steagall's 2007 album as well. Cover versions have appeared on compilation albums by a number of artists, even some who did not release "Here We Go Again" as a single.

== Original version ==
In November 1959, after twelve years as a professional musician, Ray Charles signed with ABC Records, following the expiration of his Atlantic Records contract. According to Will Friedwald in A Biographical Guide to the Great Jazz and Pop Singers, "His first four ABC albums were all primarily devoted to standards..." In the 1960s, he experienced crossover success with both rhythm and blues and country music. Because Charles was signed to ABC as a rhythm and blues singer, he decided to wait until his contract was up for its three-year renewal before experimenting with country music, although he wanted to do so sooner. With the assistance of ABC executive Sid Feller, he gathered a set of country songs to record, despite the wishes of ABC. The release of his 1962 country albums Modern Sounds in Country and Western Music and its follow-up Modern Sounds in Country and Western Music, Vol. 2 broadened the appeal of his music to the mainstream. At this point, Charles began to appeal more to a white audience. In 1962 he founded his own record label, Tangerine Records, which ABC-Paramount Records promoted and distributed.

"Here We Go Again" was recorded during a phase in Charles' career when he was focused on performing country music. Thus, "Here We Go Again" was a country music song released by the Tangerine label ABC-Paramount, but performed in Charles' rhythm and blues style. However, his works did not bear the Tangerine label until 1968. Feller left ABC in 1965, but he returned to arrange Charles' 1967 album, Ray Charles Invites You to Listen. Joe Adams produced and engineered the album, which included "Here We Go Again".

First released by Charles in 1967, "Here We Go Again" was written by Don Lanier and Rod Steagall and published by the Dirk Music Company. Charles recorded it at RPM International Studios, Los Angeles, and the song was listed as the sixth of ten tracks on Ray Charles Invites You to Listen. Starting in 1987, it was included in numerous greatest hits and compilation albums. When Modern Sounds in Country and Western Music was reissued in 1988, the song was added as a bonus track. It was also included on the 1988 album Ray Charles Anthology.

=== Composition ===
"Here We Go Again" (1967)
Ray Charles' "Here We Go Again" from Ray Charles Invites You to Listen is the first notable cover of the song. It is a rhythm and blues version from the part of Charles's career when he was recording country music.

According to the sheet music published by Dirk Music, "Here We Go Again" is set in 12/8 time with a slow shuffle tempo of sixty-nine beats per minute. The song is written in the key of B♭ major. It is primarily a country song, but contains gospel influences. According to Matthew Greenwald of AllMusic, "'Here We Go Again' is a soulful ballad in the Southern blues tradition. Lyrically, it has a resignation and pain that makes the blues, simply, what it is. The recording has a simple and sterling gospel arrangement and, in retrospect, is one of Charles' finer attempts in the studio from the 1960s."

=== Reception ===
Greenwald described the original version of "Here We Go Again" as "Another excellent example of how Ray Charles was able to fuse blues and country". In a review for the single, a writer for Billboard magazine wrote that the song could easily be a "blockbuster" for Charles.

The original version debuted at number 79 on the Billboard Hot 100 chart in the May 20, 1967, issue and number 48 on the US Billboard Hot Rhythm & Blues Singles top 50 chart on June 10, 1967. For the weeks ending July 15, 22 and 29, the song spent three weeks at its peak position of number 15 on the Hot 100 chart. It spent July 22 and 29 at its peak position of number 5 on the Hot Rhythm & Blues Singles chart. By August 12, it fell out the Hot 100 chart, ending a 12-week run. It remained on the Hot Rhythm & Blues Singles chart for 13 weeks ending on September 2. "Here We Go Again" was Charles' last single to enter the top twenty of the Hot 100. For the year 1967 the song finished at number 80 on the US Billboard Year-End Hot 100 chart and 33 on the Year-End Hot Rhythm & Blues Singles chart.

Abroad, it debuted on the UK Singles Chart top 40 at number 38 on July 8, 1967, which would be its peak. It totalled 3 non-consecutive weeks on the chart. In the Netherlands, "Here We Go Again" appeared on the singles chart at number 10 on July 15, 1967, and later peaked at number three.

According to Will Friedwald, this song is an example of Charles vocalizing in what would ordinarily be a generally extraneous manner for dramatic effect by using a different voice than he had ever previously exhibited. He sang "... not just using the squeak—using a whole new kind of squeak, in fact—for additional coloring on the sidelines, but making it the heart of the matter, literally squeaking out the words and notes in harmony with the Raelettes" (his background singers).

=== Track listing ===
- 7-inch single
1. "Here We Go Again" – 3:14
2. "Somebody Ought to Write a Book About It" – 3:02

According to AllMusic, the solo version is listed at lengths between 3:14 and 3:20 on various albums.

=== Credits ===
Charles is credited as vocalist and pianist with unknown accompaniment. Feller is credited for having arranged and conducted the recording. This is one of two songs on the album ("Yesterday" being the other) that in addition to being listed as ABC-Par ABC595 is credited as Dunhill DZS036 [CD]. The individual song had a label number ABC/TRC 10938. "In the Heat of the Night" also had a Dunhill credit but a different number for both Dunhill and ABC.

== Nancy Sinatra version ==
"Here We Go Again"

Single by Nancy Sinatra

from the album Nancy
- B-side: "Memories"
- Released: 1969
- Recorded: 1969
- Genre: Country
- Length: 3:07
- Label: Reprise (#0821)
- Songwriters: Don Lanier, Red Steagall
- Producer: Billy Strange

Nancy Sinatra singles chronology
"God Knows I Love You" (1968)	"Here We Go Again" (1969)	"Drummer Man" (1969)

Nancy Sinatra recorded a cover of the song for her 1969 album Nancy, which was her first album after ending her business relationship with producer Lee Hazlewood. The cover, which according to programming guides had an easy listening and country music appeal, was produced by Billy Strange. The B-side to the single, "Memories", was written by Strange along with Mac Davis. Billboard magazine staff reviewed the song favorably, stating that the cover was a "smooth sing-a-long pop style". They also commended Sinatra's singing, calling it a "fine" performance, noting that it would likely return her to the Billboard charts. Sinatra's version was later remastered and reissued in 1996.

=== Chart performance ===
Although CD Universe describes the song as a country music song, it never charted on country music charts. For the week ending May 17, 1969, the song was listed among US Billboard Bubbling Under Hot 100 Singles chart at number 106 and debuted on the US Billboard Easy Listening Top 40 chart at number 30. The following week it debuted on the US Billboard Hot 100 chart at number 98, its apex for its two-week stay. The song then spent a total of two weeks on the Hot 100. For the week ending June 7, the song spent a second consecutive week at its peak position of number 19 on the Easy Listening chart. The song remained on the chart for five weeks until June 14, 1969. In Canada "Here We Go Again" debuted at number 38 on the RPM Adult Contemporary chart (previously Young Adult Chart) on June 2, 1969. It peaked at number 21 for the week of June 16, 1969. The song spent a total of five weeks on the chart. According to AllMusic databases, 1969 was the final year in her career that Sinatra reached the Hot 100 chart (with "Here We Go Again", "God Knows I Love You" and "Drummer Man").

=== Track listing ===
- 7-inch vinyl single
1. "Here We Go Again" – 3:07
2. "Memories" – 3:40

According to AllMusic, the original track was 3:09, but when it appeared on the 2006 compilation album Essential Nancy Sinatra, it was 3:11. The single was initially released through Reprise Records. In a non-exclusive licensing agreement, Reprise (part of Warner Music) gave RCA Records the rights to distribute the records of some of their artists including Sinatra and Dean Martin. In 1971, Sinatra and Reprise parted ways, so she signed a long-term contract with RCA Records.

=== Credits ===
The following musicians performed on this track:

- B.J. Baker Singers (backup vocals)
- The Blossoms (backup vocals)

The following musicians performed on this album:

- Al Casey (guitar)
- Jerry McGee (guitar)
- Red Rhodes (steel guitar)
- Sid Sharp (violin, strings)
- Jim Horn (flute)
- Roy Caton (trumpet)
- Don Randi (piano)
- Jerry Scheff (bass guitar)
- Carol Kaye (bass guitar)
- Hal Blaine (drums)

== Norah Jones and Ray Charles duet version ==
"Here We Go Again"

Single by Ray Charles and Norah Jones

from the album Genius Loves Company
- Released: January 31, 2005
- Studio: RPM International (Los Angeles)
- Genre: Pop
- Length: 3:59
- Label: Concord/Hear Music
- Songwriters: Don Lanier, Red Steagall
- Producer: John R. Burk

Ray Charles singles chronology
"Mother" (2002)	"Here We Go Again" (2005)	"You Don't Know Me" (2005)

Norah Jones singles chronology
"Those Sweet Words" (2004)	"Here We Go Again" (2004)	"Thinking About You" (2006)

Audio video
- "Here We Go Again" on YouTube

In 2004, Ray Charles re-recorded "Here We Go Again" as a duet with American singer-songwriter Norah Jones, who grew up listening to his music. During Jones' Billboard interview for her 2010 collaboration album ...Featuring, which included her "Here We Go Again" duet, she said "I got a call from Ray asking if I'd be interested in singing on this duets record. I got on the next plane and I brought my mom. We went to his studio and did it live with the band. I sang it right next to Ray, watching his mouth for the phrasing. He was very sweet and put me at ease, which was great because I was petrified walking in there." She noted in one ...Featuring interview that the only part that was not done live was a piano overlay that she added afterwards to complement Charles' keyboard. In the same interview, she noted that she had been given the opportunity to select a song from Charles' songbook to perform as a duet and felt that this one provided the best opportunity to harmonize rather than alternate vocal verses. On the record, the two singers vocalize, accompanied by Billy Preston on Hammond organ, who had at one time been the regular organist in Charles' band.

=== Reception ===
As part of Charles' Grammy Award for Album of the Year-winning Genius Loves Company, the song proved to be the most popular and critically acclaimed on the album. Although the song had its early detractors, it received mostly favorable reviews. Several reviewers noted the complementarity of Jones and Charles. The Daily Vault's Jason Warburg described the song as a "jazzy, slinky pas de deux" in which Charles matches Jones note for note." JazzTimes' Christopher Loudon said Charles "blends seamlessly with Jones on a velvet-and-buckram" performance. The song was described by the Orlando Sentinel's Jim Abbott as a recreation of one of the gems from Charles' country music phase of the 1960s that produced the perfect "combination of voices and instruments" with Preston's accompanying role on Hammond B3. As opposed to other tracks on the album, when Charles' voice was understated, this song was said to represent his "indomitable spirit", while Jones performed as "an empathetic foil, [with] her warm, lazy vocals meshing convivially with his over a spare but funky arrangement". Author Mike Evans wrote that "there's a mutual warmth of purpose in every breath [Charles and Jones] take" on the song. Music Week staff noted the timeliness of the release with the biographical film Ray in theaters and described the song as soulful, that finely combines Charles' "deep, honeyed growl with Jones's lighter timber", while noting Preston for his "sweeping" organ work.

The song received other specific forms of praise. Robert Christgau notes that Jones carried the vocal burden as did many of Charles's duet partners on the album. USA Today's Steve Jones said the song "strikes an easy groove". PopMatters' Kevin Jagernauth says "Jones nicely compliments Charles on this beautiful opening track". Preston's performance was favorably described by The Washington Post's Richard Harrington as "smoky". Critic Randy Lewis from the Chicago Tribune noted that the song's "countrified ache" represented that part of Charles' career.

When the song was included on Jones' ...Featuring, which included three of her collaborations from Albums of the Year and several from albums that were nominees, the song did not stand out. Few of the reviews at Metacritic had substantive comments on the duet when included among her group of collaborations. While reviewing ...Featuring, Jonathan Keefe of Slant Magazine wrote that the duet was a "more staid and less compelling recording" on the album. However, AllMusic staff noted that she worked comfortably with Charles and Chris Rizik of Soul Tracks said the track was more than just filler.

=== Awards and nominations ===
"Here We Go Again" (2004)
The Jones–Charles version was the first notable duet vocals version and earned Grammy Awards for Record of the Year and Best Pop Collaboration with Vocals (posthumously for Charles).

In December 2004, the Jones–Charles version of the song was nominated in two categories at the 47th Grammy Awards. At the February 13, 2005 awards ceremony, the duet earned the award for Record of the Year and Best Pop Collaboration with Vocals. It was the second Record of the Year winner not to make the Hot 100 (following "Walk On" in 2001 by U2). The song won Record of the Year, but not Song of the Year. Record of the Year is awarded to the artist(s), producer(s), recording engineer(s) and/or mixer(s), if other than artist for newly recorded material. Song of the Year is awarded to the songwriter(s) of a new song or a song first achieving prominence during the eligibility year. Steagall and Lanier are credited as the writers of this song from their work on its original version in 1967. Thus, the song was not a new song.

=== Chart performance ===
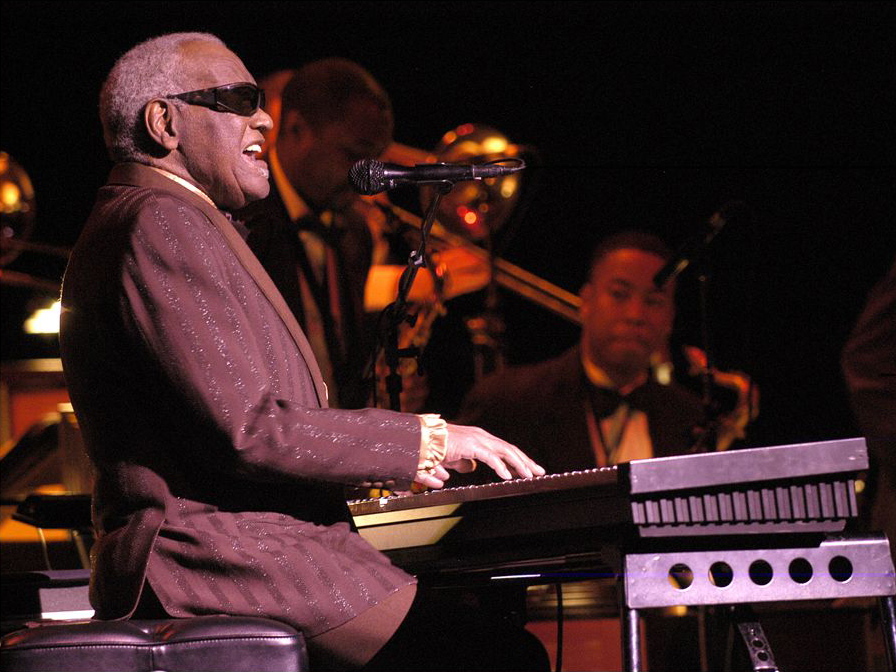
Charles in July 2003, less than 11 months before his 2004 death

For the week ending September 18, 2004, Genius Loves Company sold 202,000 copies, ranking second on the US Billboard 200 chart and becoming Charles' highest-charting album in over 40 years. Digital singles sales saw 12 of the 13 tracks on the album make the US Billboard Hot Digital Tracks Top 50 chart. "Here We Go Again" was the download sales leader among the album's songs that totaled 52,000 digital downloads. During the week the album was released, the song debuted on the US Billboard Hot Digital Tracks chart at number 26. "Here We Go Again" fell out of the top 50 two weeks later. It was released as a single for digital download on January 31, 2005. On May 22, 2019, the song was certified gold by the Recording Industry Association of America for shipments exceeding 500,000 units in the United States.

After the album earned eight Grammy Awards and the song won Record of the Year, sales picked up and the album was re-promoted. "Here We Go Again" entered the US Billboard Bubbling Under Hot 100 chart at number five in the issue dated (for the week ending) February 26, 2005. The song charted for a week on both the US Billboard Hot Digital Songs top 75 at number 73 and the US Billboard Pop 100 at number 74 for the week ending March 5, 2005, but still did not make the Hot 100, ranking 113th before falling out of the chart. However, it ascended to its Bubbling Under Hot 100 chart peak position of number two for the week ending March 5, 2005. A compact disc single of the song was released on April 19, 2005.

In Austria, the duet debuted on the Ö3 Austria Top 40 chart at number 53 on March 6, 2005, and peaked the following week at number 52. It logged six weeks on the chart. "Here We Go Again" entered the French Singles Chart at number 54 on April 2, 2005 and peaked one week later at number 51. It lasted 10 weeks on the top 100 chart.

=== Certification ===
On May 22, 2019, the song achieved gold RIAA certification.

Region	Certification	Certified units/sales
United States (RIAA)	Gold	500,000^{‡}
^{‡} Sales+streaming figures based on certification alone.

=== Track listing ===
- CD single
1. "Here We Go Again" (Ray Charles and Norah Jones) – 3:59
2. "Mary Ann" (Poncho Sanchez featuring Ray Charles) – 5:05
3. "Interview With Norah Jones" – 1:35

According to AllMusic, the duet version was between 3:56 and 3:59 on various albums.

=== Credits ===
Musicians

- Ray Charles (keyboard)
- Norah Jones (piano)
- Billy Preston (Hammond B3)
- Irv Kramer (guitar)
- Tom Fowler (bass guitar)
- Ray Brinker (drums)

Technicians

- John Burk (producer)
- Terry Howard (recording)
- Seth Presant (Pro Tools engineer)
- Ken Desantis (assistant engineer)
- Bill Kramer (assistant engineer)
- Mark Fleming (assistant engineer)
- Al Schmitt (mixer)
- Steve Genewick (assistant mixer)
- Doug Sax (mastering)
- Robert Hadley (mastering)

The song was recorded at RPM International Studio (Los Angeles), mixed at Capitol Studios and mastered at the Mastering Lab.

== Country chart versions ==
Johnny Duncan charted a version of the song for Columbia Records that missed the Hot 100 chart. It debuted on the Hot Country Songs chart on September 30, 1972, peaking at number 66 and spending a total of five weeks on the chart. The song also spent five weeks on the Cashbox Country Singles Chart, debuting on October 7, 1972, and peaking at number 61 three weeks later.

In 1982, Roy Clark produced a version of the song on his Turned Loose album for Churchill Records that he performed on the November 6, 1982 (season 15, episode 9), episode of Hee Haw. It missed the Hot 100 chart, but it entered the Hot Country Songs chart for the week ending October 30, 1982, at 88. The song was one of only two mentioned in the October 30, 1982, Billboard album review and was described as "a solid country number". The song peaked at number 65 in the week ending November 27 and remained in the chart for two more weeks, making the total run seven weeks. The song also spent seven weeks on the Cashbox Country Singles Chart, debuting on November 6, 1982, and peaking at number 61 for two weeks (December 4 and 11).

== Other versions and uses ==
Billy Vaughn covered "Here We Go Again" on his 1967 Ode to Billy Joe instrumental album, as did Dean Martin on his 1970 album My Woman, My Woman, My Wife. Glen Campbell's version appeared on his 1971 album The Last Time I Saw Her, Eddy Arnold's on his 1972 album Lonely People, and George Strait's on his 1992 album Holding My Own. Steagall performed it with Reba McEntire on his 2007 Here We Go Again album, but she did not include it on her 2007 duets album Reba: Duets, which was released four weeks later. Their collaboration was favorably reviewed, and McEntire was said to reinvigorate this country standard by Nathalie Baret of ABQ Journal. Martin's version was 3:07, and it later appeared on compilation albums, starting with the 1996 Dean Martin Gold, Vol. 2. It has appeared on a handful of other Martin compilation albums. Campbell's version was only 2:26. Strait's version is 2:53 and appears later on his 2004 Greatest Collection at a 2:55 length. Steagall's version with McEntire (who Steagall discovered at a 1974 county fair) is 3:10. R&B and boogie-woogie pianist and singer Little Willie Littlefield recorded a version for his 1997 album The Red One. Peters and Lee made a version of the song on their 1976 on their Serenade album. Joe Dolan produced a 1972 single of the song that he included on his 1976 album Golden Hour Of Joe Dolan Vol. 2 and several of his greatest hits albums.

Willie Nelson and Wynton Marsalis, along with Norah Jones, performed two concerts at Lincoln Center's Rose Theatre on February 9 and 10, 2009. A 2011 live tribute album by Nelson and Marsalis featuring Jones entitled Here We Go Again: Celebrating the Genius of Ray Charles was recorded on these two live dates. The album, which was released on March 29, 2011, included a track entitled "Here We Go Again". The vocals on "Here We Go Again" were performed by Jones and Nelson, while instrumental support was provided by Marsalis (trumpet), Dan Nimmer (piano), Mickey Raphael (harmonica), Walter Blanding (tenor saxophone), Carlos Henriquez (bass) and Ali Jackson (drums and percussion). The song, which had a length of 5:10, was arranged by Andy Farber and performed in a rhythm and blues 12/8 shuffle. BBC music reviewer Bill Tilland noted that Jones added her usual "style and panache" to this performance. At one concert performance, The New York Times critic Nate Chinen felt the song sounded unrehearsed. Although critique of this track is sparse, Pop Matters's Will Layman notes that the album reveals "how decisive and strong Jones sounds while singing with a truly legitimate jazz group" and how Nelson predictably "breezes through his tunes with cavalier grace". Meanwhile, he praises the professional mastery of Marsalis' quintet. Tilland also notes that on the album Marsalis' band "compensates quite adequately for occasional lacklustre vocals."

George Strait's country music version was performed with the instrumental support of Joe Chemay (bass guitar), Floyd Domino (piano), Buddy Emmons (steel guitar), Steve Gibson (acoustic guitar), Johnny Gimble (fiddle), Jim Horn (saxophone, alto flute), Larrie Londin (drums), Liana Manis (background vocals), Curtis Young (background vocals), and Reggie Young (electric guitar). The album was produced by Jimmy Bowen and Strait. In 1992 Entertainment Weekly's Alanna Nash regarded the album as Strait's "most hard-core country album" up to that point in his career. AllMusic staff noted that the album held its own at the time of release against most of its competitors and has aged better than most country music albums. Ralph Novak, Lisa Shea, Eric Levin, and Craig Tomashoff of People said the album represents the most straightforward style of singing. The iTunes Store describes the album as the result of a transition in eras of country music.

The song plays during the opening credit dance by Franz Walsch (Harry Baer) and Margarethe (Margarethe von Trotta) in Rainer Werner Fassbinder's 1970 film Gods of the Plague. However, the song was on neither the eponymous soundtrack for the 2004 film Ray nor the limited edition additional soundtrack album More Music From Ray.

== Bibliography ==
- Albert, George; Frank Hoffmann (1984). The Cash Box Country Singles Charts 1958–1982. Scarecrow Press, Inc. ISBN 0-8108-1685-7.
- Charles, Ray; Ritz, David (2004). Brother Ray: Ray Charles' Own Story (Third Da Capo Press ed.). Da Capo Press. ISBN 0-306-81431-5.
- Lydon, Michael (1998). Ray Charles: Man and Music. Riverhead Books. ISBN 1-57322-132-5.
- Evans, Mike (2005). Ray Charles: The Birth of Soul. Omnibus Press. ISBN 978-1-84449-764-5.
