= Genius Loves Company =

Studio album by Ray Charles
- Released: August 31, 2004
- Recorded: June 2003 – March 2004
- Genres: Rhythm and blues, soul, country, blues, jazz, pop
- Length: 54:03
- Label: Concord/Hear Music
- Producers: John Burk; Phil Ramone

Ray Charles chronology
Strong Love Affair (1996)	Genius Loves Company (2004)	Genius & Friends (2005)

Singles from Genius Loves Company
- 1. "You Don't Know Me" Released: September 18, 2004; 2. "Here We Go Again" Released: 2005

"Here We Go Again"
Ray Charles and Norah Jones' "Here We Go Again" from Genius Loves Company

Genius Loves Company is the final studio album by rhythm and blues and soul musician Ray Charles, posthumously released August 31, 2004, on Concord Records. Recording sessions for the album took place between June 2003 and March 2004. The album consists of rhythm and blues, soul, country, blues, jazz and pop standards performed by Charles and several guest musicians, such as Natalie Cole, Elton John, James Taylor, Norah Jones, B. B. King, Gladys Knight, Diana Krall, Van Morrison, Willie Nelson and Bonnie Raitt. Genius Loves Company was the last album recorded and completed by Charles before his death in June 2004.

The album was produced by Concord A&R man, John Burk, who approached Charles with the concept of a duets album for a collaboration of Concord Records and Hear Music, the record label owned by the coffee chain Starbucks. It served as the first original non-compilation release by Hear Music, as well as one of Ray Charles' most commercially successful albums. On February 2, 2005, Genius Loves Company was certified triple-platinum in sales by the Recording Industry Association of America following sales of over three million copies in the United States. It also became Charles' second to reach number one on the Billboard 200, after Modern Sounds in Country and Western Music (1962). On February 13, 2005, the album was awarded eight Grammy Awards including Album of the Year and Record of the Year.

== Reception ==
Professional ratings
Review scores
Source	Rating
AllMusic	3/5 stars
Robert Christgau	A−
The Daily Vault	A−
Entertainment Weekly	(C)
JazzTimes	(favorable)
Mojo	4/5 stars
PopMatters	(favorable)
Rolling Stone	3/5 stars
USA Today	3/4 stars
The Western Courier	B+

=== Commercial performance ===
Genius Loves Company proved to be a comeback success for Ray Charles, in terms of sales and critical response, quickly becoming his first top-10 album in forty years and the best-selling record of his career. The release of Genius Loves Company served as Charles' two-hundred fiftieth of his recording career, and was his last recording before his death on June 10, 2004.

Within its first week of release, the album sold over 200,000 copies in the United States alone, while it debuted at #2 on the Billboard 200 chart, eventually ascending to #1 on March 5, 2005, becoming Charles' first #1 album since Modern Sounds In Country And Western Music in 1962. Genius Loves Company also received a significant amount of airplay on jazz, blues, R&B, urban contemporary and country radio stations, as well as critical praise from well-known publications and music outlets. By the first month of its release, the album had shipped over two million copies in the United States and shipped more than three million worldwide, receiving gold, silver and platinum certifications across North America, Europe and several other regions. The massive commercial success of the album (over 5.5 million copies were sold worldwide up to 2007) was attributed in part to it being distributed and promoted via Starbucks coffeehouses, as well as the distribution and marketing relationship between Concord Records and the Starbucks Hear Music label. The Starbucks Coffee Company proved to be singularly responsible for nearly thirty-percent of the total domestic sales of the album. Following several certifications of gold, platinum and multi-platinum in the United States during the fall of 2004, Genius Loves Company earned a triple-platinum sales certification by the Recording Industry Association of America (RIAA) on February 2, 2005.

For the week ending September 18, 2004, Genius Loves Company sold 202,000 copies, ranking second on the Billboard 200. This was Charles' highest charting album in over 40 years and represented an opening week record for a duets album (since Nielsen SoundScan began tracking such statistics in 1991). Frank Sinatra's 1993 Duets sold 339,000 during the Christmas week, eight weeks after its 173,500-unit opening. The initial shipment of 733,000 units was an all-time record for the 31-year history of Concord Records and the sales represented a Soundscan record for the company. In addition, the album placed at number five on the Top R&B/Hip-Hop Albums for Charles' highest placement since A Portrait of Ray peaked at fifth in 1968. These albums sales occurred despite digital singles sales that saw 12 of the 13 tracks on the album make the Hot Digital Tracks Top 50 chart. The previous record for most tracks from the same album was 9 by Neil Young & Crazy Horse with their 2003 Greendale album. "Here We Go Again" was the download sales leader among the album's tracks, but the 12 tracks totaled 52,000 digital downloads.

=== Grammy Awards ===
In December 2004, announcements were made that the album had earned ten Grammy Award nominations. At the 47th Grammy Awards on February 13, 2005, Genius Loves Company led the annual ceremony with a total of eight awards, including Album of the Year, while its hit single "Here We Go Again" won a Grammy Award for Record of the Year. Awards won are as listed below:

- Grammy Award for Album of the Year: John Burk, Phil Ramone, Herbert Waltl, Don Mizell (producers), Terry Howard (producer & engineer/mixer), Robert Fernandez, John Harris, Pete Karam, Joel Moss, Seth Presant, Al Schmitt, Ed Thacker (engineers/mixers), Robert Hadley, Doug Sax (mastering engineers)
- Grammy Award for Best Pop Vocal Album: Ray Charles and various artists
- Grammy Award for Best Engineered Album, Non-Classical: Robert Fernandez, John Harris, Terry Howard, Pete Karam, Joel Moss, Seth Presant, Al Schmitt & Ed Thacker (engineers)
- Grammy Award for Best Surround Sound Album: John Burk (Producer), Al Schmitt (surround mix engineer), Robert Hadley & Doug Sax (surround mastering)
- Grammy Award for Record of the Year: John Burk (producer), Terry Howard, Al Schmitt (engineers/mixers), Ray Charles & Norah Jones for "Here We Go Again"
- Grammy Award for Best Pop Collaboration with Vocals: Ray Charles and Norah Jones for "Here We Go Again"
- Grammy Award for Best Gospel Performance: Ray Charles & Gladys Knight for "Heaven Help Us All"
- Grammy Award for Best Instrumental Arrangement Accompanying Vocalist(s): Victor Vanacore (arranger) for "Over the Rainbow" performed by Ray Charles & Johnny Mathis

The Album of the Year award was presented to coproducer John Burk, who accepted on behalf of himself and coproducer Phil Ramone, who was unable to make the trip to Los Angeles for the Grammy ceremony. The cover featured an iconic image by photographer Norman Seeff.

== Track listing ==
In UK, this album was also published as LP record, where track 1 to 7 were on side A and the rest of tracks were on side B.

No.	Title	Writer(s)	Length
1.	"Here We Go Again" (with Norah Jones)	Don Lanier, Red Steagall	3:59
2.	"Sweet Potato Pie" (with James Taylor)	James Taylor	3:47
3.	"You Don't Know Me" (with Diana Krall)	Eddy Arnold, Cindy Walker	3:55
4.	"Sorry Seems to Be the Hardest Word" (with Elton John)	Elton John, Bernie Taupin	3:59
5.	"Fever" (with Natalie Cole)	Eddie Cooley, John Davenport	3:30
6.	"Do I Ever Cross Your Mind?" (with Bonnie Raitt)	Billy Burnette, Michael Smotherman	4:34
7.	"It Was a Very Good Year" (with Willie Nelson)	Ervin Drake	4:59
8.	"Hey Girl" (with Michael McDonald)	Gerry Goffin, Carole King	5:15
9.	"Sinner's Prayer" (with B. B. King)	Lowell Fulson, Lloyd Glenn	4:25
10.	"Heaven Help Us All" (with Gladys Knight)	Ronald Miller	4:32
11.	"Over the Rainbow" (with Johnny Mathis)	Harold Arlen, E.Y. Harburg	4:54
12.	"Crazy Love" (with Van Morrison)	Van Morrison	3:42

10th Anniversary Deluxe Edition
No.	Title	Writer(s)	Length
13.	"Mary Ann" (with Poncho Sanchez)	Ray Charles	5:05
14.	"Unchain My Heart" (with Take 6)	Teddy Powell, Bobby Sharp	4:06

== Chart history ==
=== Weekly charts ===
Chart (2004–05)	Peak position
Australian Albums (ARIA)	4
Austrian Albums (Ö3 Austria)	1
Belgian Albums (Ultratop Flanders)	2
Belgian Albums (Ultratop Wallonia)	6
Canadian Albums (Billboard)	1
Canadian R&B Albums (Nielsen SoundScan)	1
Danish Albums (Hitlisten)	27
Dutch Albums (Album Top 100)	4
Finnish Albums (Suomen virallinen lista)	37
French Albums (SNEP)	6
German Albums (Offizielle Top 100)	10
Hungarian Albums (MAHASZ)	9
Icelandic Albums (Tónlist)	3
Irish Albums (IRMA)	21
Italian Albums (FIMI)	1
New Zealand Albums (RMNZ)	3
Norwegian Albums (VG-lista)	6
Portuguese Albums (AFP)	2
Scottish Albums (Official Charts)	24
Spanish Albums (Promusicae)	30
Swedish Albums (Sverigetopplistan)	9
Swiss Albums (Schweizer Hitparade)	4
UK Albums (Official Charts)	18
US Billboard 200	1
US Top R&B/Hip-Hop Albums (Billboard)	4

=== Year-end charts ===
Chart (2004)	Position
Belgian Albums (Ultratop Wallonia)	61
Dutch Albums (Album Top 100)	58
French Albums (SNEP)	134
US Billboard 200	51
US Top R&B/Hip-Hop Albums (Billboard)	95
Worldwide Albums (IFPI)	24

Chart (2005)	Position
Australian Albums (ARIA)	55
Austrian Albums (Ö3 Austria)	36
Belgian Albums (Ultratop Flanders)	61
Belgian Albums (Ultratop Wallonia)	77
Dutch Albums (Album Top 100)	59
French Albums (SNEP)	190
German Albums (Offizielle Top 100)	85
Swiss Albums (Schweizer Hitparade)	58
UK Albums (OCC)	170
US Billboard 200	20
US Top R&B/Hip-Hop Albums (Billboard)	35

=== Singles ===
Single	Chart (2004)	Peak position
"You Don't Know Me"	U.S. Billboard Adult Contemporary	21
"Here We Go Again"	French Singles Chart	51
"Here We Go Again"	Austrian Singles Chart	52

== Certifications ==
Sales certifications for Genius Loves Company
Region	Certification	Certified units/sales
Argentina (CAPIF)	Platinum	40,000^{^}
Australia (ARIA)	Platinum	70,000^{^}
Austria (IFPI Austria)	Gold	15,000^{*}
Canada (Music Canada)	2× Platinum	200,000^{^}
France (SNEP)	Gold	100,000^{*}
Germany (BVMI)	Gold	100,000^{^}
Ireland (IRMA)	Gold	7,500^{^}
Japan (RIAJ)	Gold	126,900
Netherlands (NVPI)	Gold	40,000^{^}
New Zealand (RMNZ)	2× Platinum	30,000^{^}
Poland (ZPAV)	Gold	20,000^{*}
Portugal (AFP)	Gold	20,000^{^}
Spain (Promusicae)	Gold	50,000^{^}
Switzerland (IFPI Switzerland)	Gold	20,000^{^}
United Kingdom (BPI)	Gold	100,000^{^}
United States (RIAA)	3× Platinum	3,000,000^{^}
Summaries
Europe (IFPI)	Platinum	1,000,000^{*}
^{*} Sales figures based on certification alone.^{^} Shipments figures based on certification alone.

== Personnel ==
- Ray Charles – piano, keyboards, vocals, song-writer

=== Guest appearances ===
- Natalie Cole – author, guest appearance
- Elton John – author, guest appearance
- Norah Jones – piano, author, guest appearance
- B.B. King – guitar, author, guest appearance
- Gladys Knight – author, guest appearance
- Diana Krall – author, guest appearance
- Johnny Mathis – author, guest appearance
- Michael McDonald – keyboards, author, guest appearance
- Van Morrison – author, guest appearance
- Willie Nelson – guitar, author, guest appearance
- Bonnie Raitt – slide guitar, author, guest appearance
- James Taylor – author, guest appearance

=== Musicians ===
- Ray Brinker – drums (1–3, 6–8, 11)
- Michael Bearden – keyboards (12)
- Tim Christensen – double bass (7)
- Tom Fowler – bass (1–9)
- Mark Converse – percussion (7–8, 11)
- George Doering – guitar (3, 5)
- Charles Fearing – guitar (10)
- James Gadson – drums (10)
- David Hayes – bass (12)
- Trey Henry – bass, double bass (11)
- Scott Higgins – timpani (11)
- Danny Jacob – guitar (10)
- Bashiri Johnson – percussion (12)
- Jim Keltner – Drums (9)
- Irvin "Magic" Kramer – guitar (1–3, 5, 7–9)
- Abraham Laboriel – bass (10)
- Michael Landau – guitar (2)
- George Marinelli – guitar (6), photography
- Jeff Mironov – guitar (12)
- Clarence McDonald – piano (10), arranger
- Alan Pasqua – piano (4)
- Shawn Pelton – drums (12)
- Billy Preston – Hammond B3 organ (1, 9–10)
- John "4 Daddman" Robinson – drums (4)
- Richard Shaw – double bass (7)
- Wally Snow – percussion (7–8, 11)
- Dave Stone – double bass (11)
- Michael Thompson – guitar (4)
- Karl Vincent – double bass (11)
- Randy Waldman – piano (3, 6–8, 11), keyboards (2–3, 5), arranger, rhythm arrangements
- Ken Wild – double bass (11)

=== Horn section ===
- Rick Baptist – trumpet (8, 11)
- Leanne Becknell- Oboe (7–8, 11)
- Wayne Bergeron – trumpet (8, 10–11)
- Charles Boito – Clarinet (7–8, 11)
- Reverend Dave Boruff – Saxophone (2, 10)
- Charlie Davis – trumpet (2)
- Dennis Farias – trumpet (8, 11)
- Brandon Fields – Baritone Saxophone (10)
- Bruce Fowler – trombone (2)
- Walt Fowler – trumpet (2)
- Gary Grant – trumpet (10)
- Larry Hall – trumpet (8, 11)
- Matt Holland – trumpet (11)
- Greg Huckins – flute (7–8, 11)
- Alexander Isles – trombone (8, 11)
- Tony Kadleck – trumpet (12)
- Jeff Kievit – trumpet (12)
- Steve Kujala – Flute (7–8, 11)
- Don Markese – clarinet (7–8, 11)
- Andrew Martin – trombone (8, 11)
- Bob McChesney – trombone (2, 10)
- Joe Meyer – French horn (7)
- John Mitchell – bassoon (7–8, 11)
- Suzette Moriarty – French horn (8, 11)
- Charlie Morillas – trombone (8, 11)
- Charles Pillow – tenor saxophone (12)
- David Riddles – bassoon (7–8, 11)
- Robert Sanders – trombone (8, 11)
- Tom Saviano – saxophone (10)
- Kenny Scharf – trumpet (8)
- Bob Shepard – saxophone (2)
- Patricia Skye – French horn (7)
- Kurt Snyder – French horn (7–8, 11)
- Richard Todd – French horn (7)
- Martin Winning – tenor saxophone (12)
- Phil Yao – French horn (8, 11)

=== String section ===
- John Acevedo – viola
- John Acosta – cello
- Sai Ly Acosta – violin
- Miguel Atwood – Ferguson viola
- Briana Bandy – viola
- Brian Benning – violin
- Robert Berg – viola
- Leslie Brown – violin
- Daphne Chen – violin
- Elenore Choate – harp
- Ronald Clark – violin
- Reginald Clews – violin
- Larry Corbett – cello
- Franklyn d'Antonio – violin
- Joel Derouin – violin
- Alan Ellsworth – violin
- Alicia Engley – violin
- Charles Everett – violin
- Kirstin Fife – violin
- Stefanie Fife – cello
- Ronald Folsom – violin
- Samuel Formicola – viola
- Armen Garabedian – violin
- Berj Garabedian – violin
- Suzanna Giordono – viola
- Nick Grant – violin
- Amy Wickman Guerra – violin
- Trevor Handy – cello
- Xiao Niu He – violin
- Gerry Hilera – violin
- Suzie Katayama – cello
- Leslie Brown Katz – violin
- Jaroslav Kettner – violin
- David Kilbride – violin
- Raymond Kobler – violin
- Johana Krejci – violin
- John Krovoza – cello
- Armen Ksadjikian – cello
- Timothy Landauer – cello
- Songa Lee – violin
- Tricia Lee – violin
- Martha Lippi – cello
- Paul Manaster – violin
- Shawn Mann – viola
- Edith Markman – violin
- Michael Markman – violin
- Robert Matsuda – violin
- Dennis Molchan – violin
- Horia Moroaica – violin
- Jennifer Munday – violin
- Maria Newman – viola
- Igor Pandurski – violin
- Todor Pelev – violin
- Edward Persi – viola
- Andrew Picken – viola
- Vladimir Polimatidi – violin
- Shanti Randall – viola
- Michele Richards – violin
- Steve Richards – cello
- Carolyn Riley – viola
- Kathleen Robertson – violin
- Julie Rogers – violin
- Anatoly Rosinsky – violin
- Nancy Roth – violin
- Edmund Stein- Violin
- Rudolph Stein – cello
- David Stenske – violin, Viola
- Raymond Tischer – viola
- Kevan Torfeh – cello
- Irina Voloshina – violin
- David F. Walther – viola
- Jennifer Walton – violin
- Zheng Wang – violin
- Dynell Weber – violin
- North Wood – violin
- Margaret Wooten – violin
- Alwyn Wright – violin
- Ken Yerke – violin
- Yang-Qin Zhao – cello

=== Vocals ===
- Tawatha Agee – vocals, singer
- James Chip Burney – choir, chorus
- Rosemary Butler – choir, chorus
- Janey Clewer – choir, chorus
- Kevin Dorsey – choir, chorus
- DeAnte Duckett – choir, chorus
- Clydene Jackson Edwards – choir, chorus
- Jim Gilstrap – choir, chorus
- Irene Madison – choir, chorus
- Fred Martin & the Levite Camp – choir, chorus
- Alethea Mills – choir, chorus
- Chavonne Morris – choir, chorus
- Seven Morris – choir, chorus
- Aminah Ofumbi – choir, chorus
- Darryl Phinnessee – choir, chorus
- Vaneese Thomas – vocals, singer
- Fonzi Thornton – vocals, singer
- John West – choir, chorus
- Terry Woods – choir, chorus
- Clarissa Watkins – choir, chorus

=== Recording personnel ===
- Brian Bennison – Copyist
- Abbey Anna – Design, Design Consultant
- David Blumberg – Arranger, String Arrangements
- John Burk – Producer, Liner Notes, Executive Producer
- Kristy Cameron – Design
- Jill Dell'Abate – Production Coordination
- Greg Dennon – Assistant Engineer
- Ken Desantis – Assistant Engineer
- Steve Deutsch – Digital Editing
- Assa Dori – Concert Master
- Assa Drori – Concert Master
- Chris Dunn – A&R
- Michael Eleopoulos – Assistant Engineer
- Andrew Felluss – Assistant Engineer
- Robert Fernandez – Engineer
- Mark Fleming – Engineer
- Steve Genewick – Assistant Engineer
- Keith Gretlein – Assistant Engineer
- Ken Gruberman – Copyist
- Robert Hadley – Mastering
- John Harris – Engineer
- Mary Hogan – A&R
- Terry Howard – Producer, Engineer
- John Jennings – Photography
- Hardi Kamsani – Assistant Engineer
- Pete Karam – Engineer
- Bill Kaylor – Assistant Engineer
- Lisa Laarman – Creative Director
- David R. Legry – Liner Notes
- Rob Mathes – Conductor
- Don Mizell – Producer
- Joel Moss – Engineer
- Vitaliano Napolitano – Photography
- Casey Phariss – Assistant Engineer
- Robert Peterson – Concert Master
- Seth Presant – Digital Editing
- Phil Ramone – Producer
- Doug Sax – Mastering
- Al Schmitt – Engineer, Mixing, String Engineer
- Jaime Sickora – Assistant Engineer
- Norman Seeff – Photography
- Dennis Shirley – Photography
- Joel Singer – Assistant Engineer
- Joe Soldo – Contractor
- Jamie Siskkora – Assistant Engineer
- Bill Airey Smith – Assistant
- Jay Spears – Assistant Engineer
- Ed Thacker – Engineer
- Darrell Thorp – Assistant Engineer
- Mike Vaccaro – Contractor
- David Vanacore – Score Assistance
- Victor Vanacore – Arranger, Score Assistance
- Herbert Waltl – Producer
