= Harry Smith Recording =

Coordinates: 40.756244°N 73.979567°W

Harry Smith Recording was the first independent recording studio on the east coast of the United States, founded in the 1930s by Harry Smith.The studio was located at 2 West 46th Street in New York City, and was taken over in 1944 by Fred Hall and Chuck Phillips.

The studio ran a recording service for radio personalities, radio stations, and radio performers who wanted to record their live radio performances. This service at this time was mechanically fixed (sound cut into a wax type of record) onto a '78 styled disk record.

== Harry Smith ==
Harry Smith was a former recording engineer for Brunswick Records. One of the records he engineered at Brunswick was Benny Goodman's "Sing, Sing, Sing." Harry Smith was born Harry Schmitt but changed his name from "Schmitt" to "Smith" because of the anti-German sentiment of the era. Smith's nephew (and godson) was Al Schmitt, who he let help on sessions at the studio from the age of 8. Schmitt recalls watching big band sessions at the recording studio. The sessions would only have one mic.

== Notable recordings ==
- Frank Sinatra, "Our Love"
- Charlie Parker Quartet, "Cheryl" (1947)
- Charlie Parker All Stars, "Parker's Mood" (1948)

Frank Sinatra made his first recording at Harry Smith Recording, an unreleased version of the song, "Our Love". Sinatra was at the studio hanging out with a band during a session and the session finished early. He asked the band if he could record a tune and sing with the band during the extra time.
