= Country Music (Willie Nelson album) =

Studio album by Willie Nelson
- Released: April 20, 2010
- Recorded: Sound Emporium (Nashville, Tennessee)
- Genres: Country, bluegrass
- Length: 54:47
- Label: Rounder
- Producer: T Bone Burnett

Willie Nelson chronology
American Classic (2009)	Country Music (2010)	Here We Go Again (2011)

Country Music is the 58th studio album by country artist Willie Nelson. The album consists in a compilation of country music standards. Produced by Grammy-winning T Bone Burnett, it was released on April 20, 2010, by Rounder Records, and according to Nelson is the first traditional album he has ever recorded. It was his first release in the 2010s.

== Recording ==
The album consists in a recollection of country music standards, Nelson stated that the album reflects his ideal of country music, featuring mandolins, fiddles and steel guitars and compared the album to his 1978 pop standards success Stardust. Nelson and music producer T Bone Burnett had the idea to record an album together while they were playing a golf game in California. The album was recorded in Nashville, Nelson stated "We venture into all kinds of music but this is country music. No one would argue the fact that these are country songs".

== Reception ==
Professional ratings
Aggregate scores
Source	Rating
Metacritic	78/100
Review scores
Source	Rating
AllMusic	3/5 stars
Los Angeles Times	3/4 stars
Mojo	4/5 stars
MusicOMH	4/5 stars
Paste	8.5/10
PopMatters	9/10
Q	4/5 stars
Slant Magazine	4/5 stars
Uncut	8/10
Under the Radar	7/10

The album reached number four in Billboard's Top Country Albums, number twenty in the Billboard 200 and number five in Canadian Top Country Albums. It was nominated for Best Americana Album in the 2011 Grammy Awards.

Billboard described the album as "front-porch, rural and rustic country music". Stephen Thomas Erlewine of AllMusic thought it lacked the "immediacy" of his recent works, and noted a displeasure in the production which "puts a layer of gauze between the listener and the singer." Juli Thanki of Engine 145 gave the album 4 out of 5 stars, complimenting the musical arrangements and song choices. However, she commented that Nelson's vocal performances were inconsistent on a few of the tracks, namely "Satan Your Kingdom Must Come Down" and "Dark as a Dungeon."

Slant Magazine rated the article with four stars out of five. Critic Jonathan Keefe wrote: "the spectacular collection of songs as much as Burnett's ace production and Nelson's first-rate performances that elevates Country Music above the recent spate of country covers records and makes the album an essential addition to Nelson's rich catalogue".

In its review of the album, BBC Music praised Willie Nelson's vocal performance, particularly his interpretations of traditional country songs. The review contrasted the album with Nelson's earlier recordings, including "Blue Eyes Crying in the Rain", "On the Road Again", "Crazy", and Red Headed Stranger. Although the reviewer considered the album different in style from his previous work, Nelson's distinctive voice was highlighted as one of its strengths. The review also praised his performances of traditional songs such as "Satan Your Kingdom Must Come Down" and "I Am a Pilgrim".

The Washington Post described Country Music as "a calm, contemplative and remarkably consistent album", praising specially the performance of "Satan, Your Kingdom Must Come Down": "while Nelson's voice remains front and center throughout, Burnett's fingerprints are all over 'Satan Your Kingdom Must Come Down.' It's a traditional hymn that nudges Nelson out of his easy-breezy comfort zone, placing those warm, generous pipes in an eerie new context. The musicians barely touch their instruments as they creep along to the song's phantom pulse".

PopMatters wrote: "One virtue shared by both Burnett, the producer, and Nelson, the performer, is an unerring trust that the song itself is up to the task. Both stand amongst American music’s most incisive students of song. That expertise reveals itself in both the selection and handling of each track on Country Music... it takes someone like T Bone Burnett to remind us that there’s no one like Willie Nelson".

== Track listing ==
No.	Title	Writer(s)	Length
1.	"Man with the Blues"	Willie Nelson	2:21
2.	"Seaman's Blues"	Billy Talmadge, Ernest Tubb	3:22
3.	"Dark as a Dungeon"	Merle Travis	4:49
4.	"Gotta Walk Alone"	Weldon Allard, John Hathcock	2:13
5.	"Satan Your Kingdom Must Come Down"	Traditional	3:19
6.	"My Baby's Gone"	Hazel Houser	5:05
7.	"Freight Train Boogie"	Jim Scott, Robert Nabor; Credited in the liner notes to Doc Watson	2:39
8.	"Satisfied Mind"	Joe "Red" Hayes, Jack Rhodes	3:52
9.	"You Done Me Wrong"	George Jones, Ray Price	3:12
10.	"Pistol Packin' Mama"	Al Dexter	2:36
11.	"Ocean of Diamonds"	Cliff Carnahan	3:36
12.	"Drinking Champagne"	Bill Mack Smith	3:42
13.	"I Am a Pilgrim"	Traditional	4:52
14.	"House of Gold"	Hank Williams	4:43
15.	"Nobody's Fault but Mine"	Traditional	4:26
Total length:			54:47

== Personnel ==
- Willie Nelson - vocals; gut-string acoustic guitar
- Jim Lauderdale - vocal harmonies on 1, 2, 7, 11, 12, 13, 14, 15
- Buddy Miller - electric guitar; vocal harmonies on 5, 6, 8, 9
- Chris Sharp - acoustic guitar; vocal harmonies on 11
- Dennis Crouch – acoustic bass
- Riley Baugus – banjo
- Ronnie McCoury - mandolin
- Mike Compton - mandolin on 2
- Russell Pahl - pedal steel
- Stuart Duncan - fiddle
- Shad Cobb - fiddle on 2, 13, 15
- Mickey Raphael - harmonica

== Chart performance ==
Country Music debuted at #4 on the U.S. Billboard Top Country Albums chart and at #20 on the U.S. Billboard 200. As of May 19, 2010, the album has sold 45,348 copies.

Chart (2010)	Peak position
U.S. Billboard Top Country Albums	4
U.S. Billboard 200	20
Swedish Albums Chart	41

=== End of year charts ===
Chart (2010)	Year-end 2010
US Billboard Top Country Albums	66
