= Al Schmitt =

American recording engineer and record producer (1930–2021)

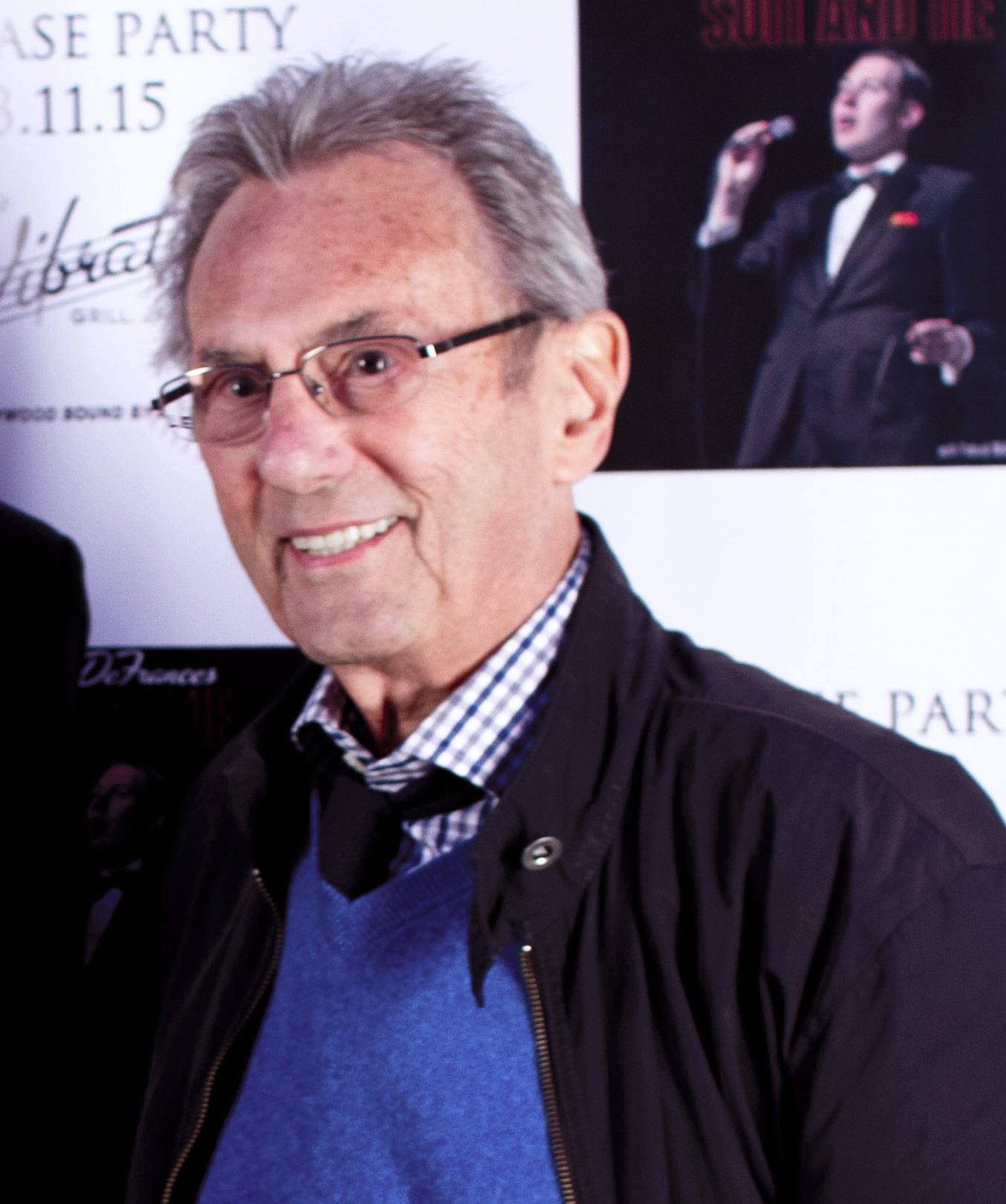
- Schmitt at James DeFrances' red carpet premiere of Suit & Tie in Bel Air (2015)

Background information
- Born: Albert Harry Schmitt; April 17, 1930; Brooklyn, New York, U.S.
- Died: April 26, 2021 (aged 91) Bell Canyon, California, U.S.
- Occupations: Recording engineer, record producer
- Years active: 1957–2021
- Label: Capitol
- Website: alschmitt.com

Albert Harry Schmitt (April 17, 1930 – April 26, 2021) was an American recording engineer and record producer. He won twenty Grammy Awards for his work with Henry Mancini, Steely Dan, George Benson, Toto, Natalie Cole, Quincy Jones, and others. He also won 2 Latin Grammys, and a Trustees Grammy for Lifetime Achievement.

== Biography ==
=== Early career ===
Schmitt grew up in New York City and lived in Brooklyn until the late 1940s. He bought his first 78 at the age of 10, Jimmie Lunceford's record "White Heat." Schmitt's favorite band was Jimmie Lunceford & His Orchestra. He had a younger sister, Doris, and two younger brothers, Richie and Russell, both of whom became audio engineers. His family was poor so some Saturdays he worked at a shop doing shoe repairs.

On the weekends, Schmitt would spend time at his uncle's recording studio, Harry Smith Recording (Smith had changed his name from "Schmitt" to "Smith" because of the anti-German sentiment of the era). From the age of 8, Schmitt would ride the subway himself from Brooklyn to Manhattan to go to the studio.

Smith's studio was the first independent recording studio on the East Coast, and he engineered sessions there for Brunswick Records including with Bing Crosby, and the Andrews Sisters. Smith was his father's brother and also Schmitt's godfather. Schmitt considers Smith one of his mentors for recording along with Tom Dowd.

Smith was friends with Les Paul, who became "like another uncle" to Schmitt. Schmitt and Paul remained friends for life.

=== Apex ===
After serving in the U.S. Navy, he began working at Apex Recording Studios at the age of 19 as an apprentice. He got the job based on a recommendation from his uncle. His job was primarily assisting on engineer Tom Dowd's recording sessions. After a few months, he was engineering small demo recordings (mono recordings at 78 rpm).

On a Saturday afternoon, Schmitt had a recording session with Duke Ellington and his Orchestra — not the small demo recording he was expecting. Schmitt was the only one at the studio and couldn't get the owner or engineer Tom Dowd on the phone so he did the session in person. Schmitt said he told Ellington many times, "Mr. Ellington, I’m not qualified to do this". Ellington responded by patting him on the leg, looking him in the eye and saying, "It’s okay sonny, we are going to get through this". They cut three songs in four hours.

He worked at Apex for two years until it closed.

When Apex closed, he moved to Nola Studios for a year (Tom Dowd told him of the opening), then worked at Fulton Recording. At Fulton, he worked with engineer Bob Doherty who taught him how to mix large orchestras.

In 1958, Schmitt moved to Los Angeles and became a staff engineer at Radio Recorders on Santa Monica Blvd in Hollywood.

In 1960, he moved to RCA in Hollywood as a staff engineer, the first engineer hired for the studio. While at RCA he engineered albums for Henry Mancini ("Moon River"), Cal Tjader, Al Hirt, Rosemary Clooney, Liverpool Five, The Astronauts, Sam Cooke ("Bring It On Home to Me," "Cupid," "Another Saturday Night") in 1961. He also did a lot of motion picture scoring work for Alex North and Elmer Bernstein. In addition, Schmitt worked with Jascha Heifetz's "Million Dollar Trio", which comprised Heifetz himself, Arthur Rubinstein on the piano, and Gregor Piatigorsky or Emanuel Feuermann on cello. Schmitt once stated that "Mr. Heifetz was very temperamental in the Studio." He has also stated that Heifetz would have angry fits during recording sessions. Schmitt also engineered the recording sessions held at RCA Hollywood for Elvis Presley's first post-army motion picture for Paramount Pictures, titled G.I. Blues. These recording sessions were held on April 27–28, 1960.

=== From the mid-1960s to 2020 ===
In 1966, Schmitt left RCA and became an independent producer. He produced albums for Jefferson Airplane, Eddie Fisher, Glenn Yarborough, Jackson Browne and Neil Young. In the mid 1970s he began spending more time engineering again, recording and mixing many artists including Willy DeVille and Dr. John.

Other career highlights include engineering both Frank Sinatra Duets albums, Ray Charles' Genius Loves Company and some of Diana Krall's albums. Much of his work in his last years was with producer Tommy LiPuma. He also recorded Sammy Davis Jr., Natalie Cole, Thelonious Monk, Elvis Presley, Tony Bennett, Madonna, Michael Jackson, and many others.

In 2014, Schmitt worked on Bob Dylan's album, Shadows in the Night, which was released on January 30, 2015.

He also worked on the Samsung's Over the Horizon telephone ringtone theme of 2015 as a recording/mixing engineer.

=== Capitol Studios ===
After leaving RCA, Schmitt worked almost exclusively at Capitol Studios, with occasional sessions at United Recording Studios and EastWest Studios, formerly Western Recording. He appeared in an advertisement for AMS Neve that featured the Neve 88R console at Capitol's Studio A.

Schmitt also appeared on the online internet television series "Pensado's Place", hosted by Dave Pensado and Herb Trawick. During one of the segments he mentioned that his favorite microphone was the Neumann U 67 tube (valve) condenser microphone, and explained that he used it on numerous sources.

=== Death ===
Schmitt died in Bell Canyon, California, on April 26, 2021, aged 91.

== Selected production discography ==
- Twist Party Vol. 2 The Ventures (1962)
- Mashed Potatoes and Gravy The Ventures (1962)
- Jazz Suite on the Mass Texts — Paul Horn, composed and conducted by Lalo Schifrin (RCA Victor, 1965)
- After Bathing at Baxter's — Jefferson Airplane (1967)
- Crown of Creation — Jefferson Airplane (1968)
- Bless Its Pointed Little Head — Jefferson Airplane (1969)
- Volunteers — Jefferson Airplane (1969)
- Hot Tuna — Hot Tuna (1970)
- Playing My Fiddle for You — Papa John Creach (1974)
- On the Beach — Neil Young (1974)
- Late for the Sky — Jackson Browne (1974)
- We Got By — Al Jarreau (1975)
- Farther Along — Spirit (1976)
- Glow — Al Jarreau (1976)
- Look to the Rainbow — Al Jarreau (1977) (co–produced w/Tommy LiPuma)
- All Fly Home — Al Jarreau (1978)
- Dream Machine — Paul Horn (1978)
- Casiopea — Casiopea (1979)

== Awards and honors ==
During his career, Schmitt recorded and mixed more than 150 Gold and Platinum albums.

He won more Grammy Awards than any other engineer or mixer. He was the first person to win both the Grammy and Latin Grammy for Album of the Year. After being Grammy nominated for his work on the film Breakfast at Tiffany's (1961), he won his first Grammy in 1963 for engineering the Hatari! score by Henry Mancini. He was awarded two Latin Grammy Awards in 2000 including Album of the Year. In 2005 he won five Grammys for his work on Ray Charles' Genius Loves Company, including Album of the Year, setting the record for most Grammys won by an engineer or mixer in one night. In 2006, he was given the Grammy Trustees Lifetime Achievement Award.

In 2014, Schmitt was awarded a star on the Hollywood Walk of Fame. The star recognizes his contribution to the music industry and is located at 1750 N. Vine Street.

Don Was, Joe Walsh, and president/CEO of the Hollywood Chamber of Commerce, Leron Gubler were speakers at Schmitt's Star Unveiling Ceremony. Gubler declared that August 13 would be designated "Al Schmitt Day" in Hollywood. Although Natalie Cole and Paul McCartney were unable to attend the ceremony, both released statements that were read by Gubler at the ceremony.

He was inducted into the TEC Awards Hall of Fame in 1997.

In June 2014, he won the Pensado Giant Award. In September 2014, he received an honorary doctorate from the Berklee College of Music.

=== Grammy Awards ===
Year	Category	Title	Note
1962	Best Engineering Contribution – Other Than Novelty And Other Than Classical	Hatari!	Henry Mancini
1976	Best Engineered Recording – Non-Classical	Breezin'	George Benson
1977	Best Engineered Recording – Non-Classical	Aja	Steely Dan
1978	Best Engineered Recording – Non-Classical	"FM (No Static at All)"	Steely Dan
1982	Best Engineered Recording – Non-Classical	Toto IV	Toto
1991	Best Engineered Album – Non-Classical	Unforgettable… with Love	Natalie Cole
1996	Best Engineered Album – Non-Classical	Q's Jook Joint	Quincy Jones
1999	Best Engineered Album – Non-Classical	When I Look in Your Eyes	Diana Krall
2000	Album of the Year	Amarte Es Un Placer	Luis Miguel
2000	Pop Album	Amarte Es Un Placer	Luis Miguel
2001	Best Engineered Album, Non-Classical	The Look of Love	Diana Krall
2002	Best Jazz Vocal Album	Live in Paris	Diana Krall
2004	Best Surround Sound Album	Genius Loves Company	Ray Charles
2004	Best Engineered Album, Non-Classical	Genius Loves Company	Ray Charles
2004	Best Pop Vocal Album	Genius Loves Company	Ray Charles
2004	Album of the Year	Genius Loves Company	Ray Charles
2004	Record of the Year	"Here We Go Again"	Norah Jones & Ray Charles
2006	Best Jazz Instrumental Album, Individual or Group	The Ultimate Adventure	Chick Corea
2008	Best Traditional Pop Vocal Album	Still Unforgettable	Natalie Cole
2010	Best Jazz Vocal Album	Eleanora Fagan (1915–1959): To Billie with Love from Dee Dee Bridgewater	Dee Dee Bridgewater
2012	Best Traditional Pop Vocal Album	Kisses on the Bottom	Paul McCartney
2013	Best Surround Sound Album	Live Kisses	Paul McCartney
