= Just Between Us (Ray Charles album) =

Studio album by Ray Charles
- Released: July 1988
- Studios: RPM Studios, Johannesburg
- Genres: R&B, soul, country soul
- Label: Columbia
- Producers: Ray Charles (all tracks), Quincy Jones (track 5)

Ray Charles chronology
Ray Charles Live (1973)	Just Between Us (1988)	Would You Believe? (1990)

Professional ratings
Review scores
Source	Rating
AllMusic	2/5 stars

Just Between Us is an album by the American singer Ray Charles, released by Columbia Records in 1988. The songs included on it represent all the styles that Charles performed until the early 1990s, which combined R&B, soul, country, blues and pop.

== Track listing ==
1. "Nothing Like a Hundred Miles" (James Taylor)
2. "I Wish I'd Never Loved You at All" (K. Morrison Phelps, R. Hice)
3. "Too Hard to Love You" (Jim Johnson)
4. "Now I Don't Believe That Anymore" (David A. Morgan)
5. "Let's Call the Whole Thing Off" (George Gershwin, Ira Gershwin)
6. "Stranger in My Hometown" (Percy Mayfield)
7. "Over the Top" (Tony Colton, Keith Christopher)
8. "I'd Walk a Little More for You" (Ken Hirsch, Doc Pomus)
9. "If That's What'cha Want" (Dave Loggins)
10. "Save the Bones for Henry Jones" (Danny Barker, Vernon Lee)

== Personnel ==
- B. B. King – guitar on "Nothing Like a Hundred Miles"
- Gladys Knight – vocals on "I Wish I'd Never Loved You at All"
- Lou Rawls – vocals on "Save the Bones for Henry Jones"
- Kenny Carr – Guitar on "Stranger in My Hometown"
