= American Classic =

Studio album by Willie Nelson
- Released: August 25, 2009
- Genres: Country; outlaw country; jazz; traditional pop
- Label: Blue Note
- Producer: Tommy LiPuma

Willie Nelson chronology
Willie and the Wheel (2009)	American Classic (2009)	Country Music (2010)

American Classic is the 57th studio album by American country music artist Willie Nelson, released on August 25, 2009. It focuses on the American popular songbook and standard jazz classics, and includes guest appearances by Norah Jones and Diana Krall.

== Recording ==
In 2008, Nelson met at his ranch in Austin, Texas with his producer Tommy Lipuma, and jazzman Joe Sample to select the songs for the album. The twelve songs selected were a collection of classics, that included a re-recording by Nelson of Always on My Mind. A duet with Barbra Streisand was planned for the recording of the album, that ultimately was not performed. The photo in the cover of the album was taken in Nelson's ranch by photographer Danny Clinch.

== Reception ==
Professional ratings
Aggregate scores
Source	Rating
Metacritic	67/100
Review scores
Source	Rating
AllMusic	3.5/5 stars
The A.V. Club	B
Consequence of Sound	B
Evening Standard	3/5 stars
Mojo	4/5 stars
MSN Music (Consumer Guide)	B+
PopMatters	4/10
Record Collector	4/5 stars
Rolling Stone	3/5 stars
Slant Magazine	3/5 stars

Rolling Stone rated the album with three stars out of five, receiving a mixed review: "Nelson can be kind of lazy [...] he only occasionally sounds like he's trying. [...] But his band pushes the music into airless cocktail-jazz territory, and Nelson often sounds glib and unengaged."

The New York Times praised Nelson's band but criticized his performance of the songs: "(American Classic) follows the lineage of “Stardust” in one sense, with a menu of songbook fare. But in another sense it feels like a capitulation.Its sound is lustrous, its personnel impeccable. What's missing is the sense of conviction that Mr. Nelson brings to his strongest work. [...] What redeems much of “American Classic” is the singularity of Mr. Nelson's voice, along with the deceptive shrewdness of his singing".

The Austin Chronicle rated the album with two stars out of five. The publication criticized the arrangements: "American Classic is tender and light, and Nelson inhabits the songs easily [...] Unable to recapture the shock of reinvention that was Stardust, producer Tommy LiPuma rests Nelson's slowly distilled vocals atop a band of jazz ringers that squares the Texan with the tradition rather than upsetting it, and only Joe Sample's piano steps up to push the songs beyond their ready-made standard status".

Prefix Magazine rated the album with eight points out of ten. The magazine gave a positive review to the album: "Country star (Willie Nelson) seems quite comfortable flying to the moon and singing among those stars. Nelson’s weathered voice is complemented by refined instrumentals from a collective of seasoned jazzmen [...] At the age of 76, the Texas native proves that there is still plenty of stardust left under his cowboy hat".

PopMatters rated the album 4/10, the bad review focused in Nelson's phrasing and the arrangements: "Nelson’s signature phrasing has become a vehicle for his laziness, as his words sound hollow and forced [...] certain performances sound like a man going through the motions. [...] Nelson’s lackluster vocals put the listener to sleep. He murmurs the verses, and seemingly wakes up for a few seconds to sing the louder chorus. Then he goes back to his nodding-out rumblings. While LiPuma and Nelson bonded over Bob Wills and the Texas Playboys and Django Reinhardt, and tried to incorporate those sounds into the arrangements, the sweeping, cinematic string sections do not resemble the Playboys’ fiddle or Reinhardt's distinct gypsy sound".

The album was nominated at the 52nd Grammy Awards for Grammy Award for Best Traditional Pop Vocal Album.

== Track listing ==
No.	Title	Writer(s)	Length
1.	"The Nearness of You"	Hoagy Carmichael, Ned Washington	4:44
2.	"Fly Me to the Moon"	Bart Howard	2:51
3.	"Come Rain or Come Shine"	Harold Arlen, Johnny Mercer	3:57
4.	"If I Had You" (featuring Diana Krall)	James Campbell, Reginald Connelly, Ted Shapiro	4:22
5.	"Ain't Misbehavin'"	Fats Waller, Harry Brooks, Andy Razaf	2:56
6.	"I Miss You So"	Jimmy Henderson, Bertha Scott, Sid Robin	4:32
7.	"Because of You"	Arthur Hammerstein, Dudley Wilkinson	3:24
8.	"Baby, It's Cold Outside" (featuring Norah Jones)	Frank Loesser	3:59
9.	"Angel Eyes"	Matt Dennis, Earl Brent	4:34
10.	"On the Street Where You Live"	Alan Jay Lerner, Frederick Loewe	2:57
11.	"Since I Fell for You"	Buddy Johnson	3:41
12.	"Always on My Mind"	Johnny Christopher, Mark James, Wayne Carson Thompson	3:28

== Personnel ==
- Willie Nelson - guitar, vocals
- Joe Sample - piano, arrangements
- Norah Jones - piano, vocals
- Mickey Raphael - harmonica
- Diana Krall - piano, vocals
- Anthony Wilson - guitar
- Lewis Nash - drums
- Jeff Hamilton - drums
- Christian McBride - bass guitar
- Robert Hurst - bass guitar
- Jim Cox - Hammond B3 organ
- Jeff Clayton - alto saxophone

== Charts ==
Chart performance for American Classic
Chart (2009)	Peak position
Australian Albums (ARIA)	52
Danish Albums (Hitlisten)	29
German Albums (Offizielle Top 100)	96
Irish Albums (IRMA)	3
New Zealand Albums (RMNZ)	3
Swedish Albums (Sverigetopplistan)	16
US Billboard 200	43
US Top Country Albums (Billboard)	14
