= El Madmo (album) =

Studio album by El Madmo
- Released: May 20, 2008 (United States)
- Genre: Indie rock, alternative rock, blues rock
- Label: Team Love Records
- Producer: MISTAREE

Professional ratings
Review scores
Source	Rating
AllMusic	3.5/5 stars

El Madmo is the first album by Norah Jones's tongue-in-cheek indie-rock band El Madmo.

A side project for jazzy singer/songwriter Jones, El Madmo is Jones on guitar and vocals, the bass guitar and vocalist Daru Oda and the drummer Andrew Borger of Jones' backing group the Handsome Band. Theatrical and often humorous (garishly glam make-up, wigs and costumes are de rigueur), each member of El Madmo goes by a stage name, with Oda as "El", Jones as "Maddie" and Borger as "Mo" — hence the band name.

== Track listing ==
1. "Carlo!"
2. "Head in a Vise"
3. "Vampire Guy"
4. "GGW"
5. "Sweet Adrenaline"
6. "Attack of the Rock People"
7. "The Best Part"
8. "Fantasy Guy"
9. "I Like it Low"
10. "Scary Lady"
11. "Nonny Goat Mon"
12. "Rock Yer Balls Off"

== Personnel ==
Band members

- El (Daru Oda) - bass guitar, vocals
- Maddie (Norah Jones) - guitar, vocals
- Mo (Andrew Borger) - drums
