= Roy Caton =

American musician (1927–2010)

- Born: Roy Vernon Caton; January 28, 1927; Frackville, Pennsylvania, U.S.
- Died: July 29, 2010 (aged 83) Avila Beach, California, U.S.
- Occupation: Musician
- Instrument: Trumpet
- Formerly of: The Wrecking Crew

Roy Vernon Caton (January 28, 1927 – July 29, 2010) was an American trumpet player and session musician.

== Biography ==
Caton was born to Vernon and Eleanor Reed Caton in Frackville, Pennsylvania. At the age of seven, he received a cornet from a family friend that began a lifelong fascination with the instrument.

After graduating from high school, Caton served in the Army until 1946. Following his discharge from the service, Caton attended the Schillinger School of Music, where he took his degree in 1951. A tour with Woody Herman's Third Herd Orchestra put him on the road with seasoned musicians, before he settled into work as a session player in Hollywood recording studios.

Caton recorded with many popular artists of the 1960s and 1970s, and was among the musicians who came to be known as The Wrecking Crew. He died in Avila Beach, California, at the age of 83.

== Selected discography ==
=== As sideman ===
- Nancy (Nancy Sinatra)
- The Birds, The Bees & The Monkees (The Monkees)
- Feelin' Groovy (Harpers Bizarre)
- The Notorious Byrd Brothers (The Byrds)
- Forever Changes (Love)
- Revolution! (Paul Revere & the Raiders)
- Back to Back (The Righteous Brothers)
- Pet Sounds (The Beach Boys)
