= John Burk =

- Born: January 6, 1962 (age 63); Oakland, California
- Occupation(s): Record producer, record executive

John Burk (born January 6, 1962) is a record producer and co-founder of the American record label Concord Records.

John Burk was born in Oakland, California, and attended high school at De La Salle. In 1995 Glen Barros and John Burk co-founded Concord Records. Artists who have published records through Concord include Esperanza Spalding, Christian Scott, Ray Charles, Ozomatli, James Taylor, George Benson and Al Jarreau.

The album Genius Loves Company, performed by Ray Charles and produced by Burk, won the Album of the Year and Record of the Year categories at the Grammy Awards in 2005. The album also led to Concord's creation of the Hear Music record label. Burk also won the category for Surround Sound Production at the 2005 Grammy Awards.

Burk was president at Concord records when artist Esperanza Spalding recorded her Exposure album during a 77-hour long live-streamed session, citing "pressure from executives at Concord Music Group, her label, to change the choice of songs on an album, or to add a featured guest that will help her reach new audiences".
