= Kenny Carr (guitarist) =

- Born: Kenneth H Carr; July 6, 1964 (age 62)
- Origin: Santa Cruz, CA, United States
- Genres: Jazz rock
- Occupations: Guitarist, musician
- Instruments: Guitar, guitar synthesizer, piano, bass
- Years active: 1979–present
- Labels: Zoozazz Music, TAS Management
- Website: https://www.youtube.com/@kennycarr5653

Kenny Carr (born July 6, 1964) is an American jazz guitarist who has recorded ten albums as a bandleader with appearances on Ray Charles' albums Live at Montreux (1997) and Just Between Us (1988).

== Life and career ==
Growing up in Santa Cruz, California, Carr began playing violin at the age of nine, gravitating to guitar by age 12. On the recommendation of his teacher Carr started playing with “Warmth” at the Cooper house where he met (Multi Grammy nominated) Saxophonist Donny McCaslin and Drummer Kenny Wollesen. They formed the "Jazz Animals" which played around Santa Cruz, culminating with a performance at the 1981 Mount Tamalpais jazz festival, opening for Freddie Hubbard and Carmen McRae. In September 1986 Carr joined Ray Charles’ group during his senior year at Berklee College of Music and toured with him for 10 years. Since Charles's passing Carr has played with the Maceo Parker Big Band and recorded ten albums as a leader.

== Discography ==
- • Friday at Five (2005)
- • Turn the Page (2006)
- • Changing Tide (2007)
- • Idle Talk (2014)
- • Exit Moon (2015)
- • Departure (2018)
- • Passages (2020)
- • Hard Jazz (2020)
- • Distance” (2021)
- The Sea (2022)
