= Charles Mitchell (songwriter) =

American songwriter

Uless Charles Mitchell (April 1, 1904 – December 27, 1972) was a songwriter, best known as a collaborator with Jimmie Davis. Davis's best-known composition, "You Are My Sunshine", published in 1939 was co-written by Mitchell.

Mitchell worked as the registrar of voters in Caddo Parish, Louisiana. He died on December 27, 1972, at the age of 67.
