= Stuart Gorrell =

American songwriter (1901–1963)

Stuart Graham Steven Gorrell (September 17, 1901 – August 10, 1963) was best known for writing the lyrics for the song "Georgia on My Mind".

Born in Knox, Indiana, Gorrell attended Indiana University Bloomington; there he became friends with fellow student Hoagy Carmichael. After hearing Carmichael play the newly composed melody at a party, Gorrell stayed up all night with Carmichael working on the song and ended up writing lyrics for it. Another successful collaboration with Carmichael was the song "My Sweet," immortalized by Louis Armstrong And His Orchestra on the OKeh label (April 5, 1930) and revived by the Quintette du Hot Club de France on the French Decca label (January 31, 1938).

Following his brief song-writing career, Gorrell became a banker.

== Sources ==
- Allmusic
