= You Are My Sunshine =

1940 song copyrighted and published by Jimmie Davis and Charles Mitchell

Single by Jimmie Davis with Charles Mitchell's Orchestra
- B-side: "Old Timer"
- Released: 1940
- Recorded: February 5, 1940
- Studio: Decca Recording, New York, New York State, U.S.
- Genre: Country, Old-time
- Length: 2:47
- Label: Decca
- Songwriter: Disputed
- Producers: Jimmie Davis, Charles Mitchell

"You Are My Sunshine" (French: Tu es mon soleil; Louisiana Creole: To vyé mô soléy) is an American standard of old-time and country music and the state song of Louisiana. Its original writer is disputed. According to BMI, by the year 2000 the song had been recorded by over 350 artists and translated into 30 languages.

Written and recorded as early as 1939, the song was first published and copyrighted in 1940 by Jimmie Davis and Charles Mitchell. Davis went on to be governor of Louisiana from 1944 to 1948 and again from 1960 to 1964, and used the song for his election campaign. In 1977, the Louisiana State Legislature decreed "You Are My Sunshine" the state song in honor of Davis. Its best-known covers include a recording by Johnny Cash in 1989. In 1999, "You Are My Sunshine" was honored with a Grammy Hall of Fame award, and the Recording Industry Association of America named it one of the Songs of the Century. In 2003, it was ranked as No. 73 on CMT's 100 Greatest Songs in Country Music.

== History ==
"You Are My Sunshine"
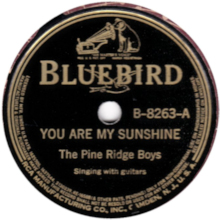

Single by the Pine Ridge Boys
- Released: October 6, 1939
- Recorded: August 22, 1939
- Studio: Atlanta, Georgia
- Genre: Country
- Length: 2:45
- Label: Bluebird
- Songwriters: Doug Spivey, Marv Taylor

The Pine Ridge Boys (Marv Taylor and Doug Spivey) recorded the song under the title "You Are My Sunshine" on August 22, 1939, and released it on October 6, 1939, for Bluebird Records. The song was recorded in Atlanta, Georgia, where the Pine Ridge Boys were from. No songwriter was listed.

The Rice Brothers' Gang recorded the song next for Decca, on September 13, 1939, and released it the following month. This group was originally from Northern Georgia but relocated to Shreveport, Louisiana, where they performed on radio station KWKH. The songwriter was listed as "Paul Rice". Paul and Hoke Rice sold the music to Jimmie Davis and Charles Mitchell shortly before 1940.

=== Copyright and publication ===
On January 30, 1940, "You Are My Sunshine" was copyrighted by Davis and Mitchell and published by Southern Music Publishing Co., Inc. of New York. The pair recorded the song on February 5, 1940, at Decca Studios in New York. Both received song-writing credit and when the copyright was renewed on February 2, 1967, both of their names were on it. Southern Music Publishing Co., Inc. is still run by the Peer Family, though BMI now lists it under American Performing Rights Society, Inc., also known by its acronym, APRS, c/o Peermusic.

=== Claims of ownership ===
According to a November 1990 article by Theodore Pappas, in Chronicles Magazine, the true writer of the song was Oliver Hood of LaGrange, Georgia. The name of the article is "The Theft of an American Classic". He asserts that Davis never actually claimed authorship because he bought the song, along with all the rights, from Paul Rice before copyrighting and publishing—a practice not uncommon in the pre-World War II music business. Though some early versions of the song credit the Rice Brothers, descendants and associates of Oliver Hood, a musician who collaborated with Rice, state that Hood wrote the song in the early 1930s and first performed it in 1933 at a Veterans of Foreign Wars convention at LaGrange.

A newspaper article in the Shreveport Times related, "On a day in 1939—no one seems to remember the exact date—Charles Mitchell and Jimmie Davis called the station KWKH to see Paul Rice (who was playing there at the time). Paul's wife was in the hospital and he needed cash to pay her bills. He sold 'Sunshine' to Davis and Mitchell for $35. Each put in $17.50." Paul Rice said, "I wrote 'You Are My Sunshine' in 1937. Where I got the idea for it, a girl over in South Carolina wrote me this long letter—it was long about seventeen pages. And she was talking about how I was her sunshine. I got the idea for the song and put a tune to it."

According to Rice, "At least 20 people claimed to have written 'You Are My Sunshine'. I had a gal write me from California that she wrote it."

Davis lived to be 101 years old and gave several conflicting accounts. When interviewed by Dorothy Horstman for her 1975 book Sing Your Heart Out Country Boy, he didn't claim authorship of the song, but instead relayed its history.

Tony Russell states, "Though Mitchell's name appears on the copyright listing, he had already sold his half-share to Davis." This is not reflected in the records of the United States Copyright Archives, which give the name, date and renewal number, "Charles Mitchell (A); 2Feb67; R403742".

== Chart performance ==
"You Are My Sunshine"

Single by Gene Autry
- B-side: "It Makes No Difference Now"
- Released: July 10, 1941
- Recorded: June 18, 1941
- Studio: CBS Columbia Square, Hollywood, California
- Genre: Hillbilly
- Length: 2:25
- Label: Okeh

"You Are My Sunshine" was one of Jimmie Davis' biggest-selling records (one source claims it was "among the top five country music recordings of that year"), and it has enjoyed continual success since. In 1940, the Vocalion version by Bob Atcher and Bonnie Blue Eyes, released in February, went to number 1 on the embryonic Billboard Top Hillbilly Recordings of the Month (July 27, 1940, issue). Perhaps thanks to the popularity of the Davis and Atcher versions, the original 1939 recording by The Pine Ridge Boys peaked at number 4 on October 26, 1940. Wayne King and his Orchestra recorded the first version to hit the popular music chart on September 4, and reached number 19 on November 9, 1940.

On March 14, 1941, the Gene Autry movie Back in the Saddle debuted with Autry singing "You Are My Sunshine" along with his signature song, "Back in the Saddle Again". On June 18, he recorded "You Are My Sunshine" at CBS Columbia Square Studio, Hollywood, California, and it was released July 10 on Okeh Records.

On July 8, 1941, Bing Crosby recorded his version at Decca Recording Studios, New York City, also released in July. Both recordings made the National Best-Selling Charts, with Autry going to number 1 on the Billboard Top Hillbilly Recordings chart on September 27, where he remained for over 20 weeks into January 1942. Autry's version remained on the chart for much of 1942, finally bowing out after 50 weeks.

In January 1951, Columbia released a version of "You Are My Sunshine" by Doris Day as a singer and polka musician Frankie Yankovic. It was assessed by Billboard as "good" but did not make it onto the charts.

In 1962, a version by Ray Charles, with the Raelettes and Margie Hendrix, reached number one on the Billboard Hot R&B Singles chart and number 7 on its Hot 100 chart.

== Appearances ==
In the 1997 The Simpsons episode "The Secret War of Lisa Simpson", Marge Simpson sends a recording of herself singing "You Are My Sunshine" to her daughter Lisa, who is homesick while enrolled in a military school. Sam Scott of Looper called it "one of the most powerful moments of melancholy beauty in a series that got them down to an art form."

In March 2020, British choirmaster Gareth Malone announced a new initiative titled the Great British Home Chorus, a new home choir for people internationally while everyone was stuck at home during the COVID-19 pandemic. For the finale, Malone orchestrated a choral version of "You Are My Sunshine", with over 11,000 singers taking part, accompanied by the London Symphony Orchestra. The song was released as a charity single, with all the profits being donated to NHS Charities Together.

== Recognition ==
After Davis' second term as governor, his admirers were disappointed when Gov. John McKeithen vetoed a bill in 1968 that would have made "You Are My Sunshine" Louisiana's official song. The reason was that the song said not a word about Louisiana. Virginia Shehee, a long-time Davis family friend and member of the Louisiana State Senate from 1976 to 1980, re-introduced legislation to make "You Are My Sunshine" the official state song. In 1977, the Legislature decreed that "You Are My Sunshine" would share honors as the state song with "Give Me Louisiana" by Doralice Fontane.

As the millennium drew near, Hall of Fame organizations started drawing up lists to honor the best music of the 20th century. On September 2, 1992, Country America magazine designated "You Are My Sunshine" 35th on its Top 100 Country Songs of All-Time list. Next, it was among the pre-1950 records selected to join the Grammy Hall of Fame on February 24, 1999. On June 17, groundbreaking ceremonies were held for the new Country Music Hall of Fame in downtown Nashville, and the event included a guitar marching band, led by Chet Atkins, playing "Wildwood Flower" and "You Are My Sunshine".

In 2000, the Songwriter's Hall of Fame chose Davis' version of "You Are My Sunshine" to receive its Towering Song Award. The National Endowment for the Arts (NEA) and the Recording Industry Association of America (RIAA) published their list of the top 365 "Songs Of The Century" on March 7, 2001, and "You Are My Sunshine" placed #14. The Country Music Foundation published "Heartaches By The Number" celebrating country's "500 greatest singles" on March 14, 2003, with "You Are My Sunshine" by Jimmie Davis on the list. On June 8, 2003, it ranked #73 on CMT's "100 Greatest Songs of Country Music". On March 21, 2013, the National Recording Registry of the Library of Congress added it for long-term preservation.

The song became associated with a viral internet meme in 2024, after it was part of a video featuring NBA player LeBron James, in which Christina Perri's cover of the song is played over a portrait photo of LeBron, intended to mock obsessive and defensive fans of LeBron, framing him as their sunshine. It is unclear who first created the video. As a result, the meme became an influence for other similar memes, such as "LeEvil James", an evil counterpart using a portrait of LeBron accompanied with a slowed down version of Perri's cover. Fans also began spamming comments on social media posts regarding James, posting lyrics of the song, and calling him "honey", "glorious king", "goat", "pookie bear" and "dad".

The song is popularly associated with animatronics, especially flowers. One such flower appeared in the finale of the third season of The L Word, when Dana dies, and Alice—who bought the flower for Dana—collapses to the ground in tears as the flower sings its song over the closing credits.
