= Red Steagall =

American performing artist (born 1938)

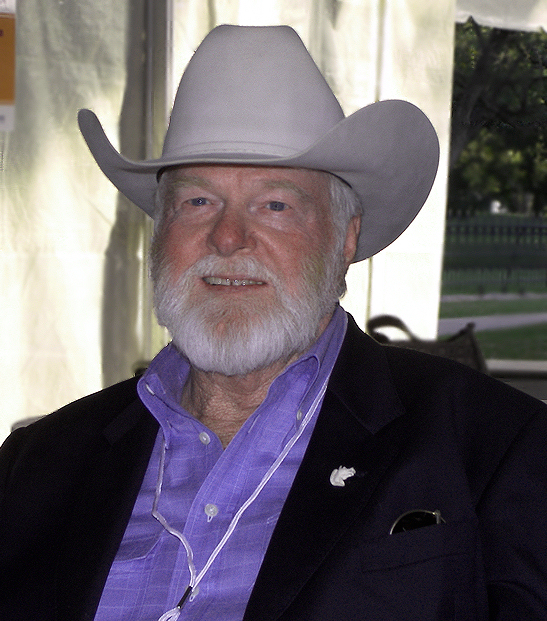
- Red Steagall at the 2007 Texas Book Festival.

Background information
- Born: Russell Steagall; December 22, 1938 (age 87); Gainesville, Texas, United States
- Origin: Sanford, Texas, United States
- Genre: Country
- Occupation: Singer-songwriter
- Instrument: Guitar
- Years active: 1968–present
- Labels: Warner Western; Capitol Nashville; Dot
- Website: www.redsteagall.com

Russell "Red" Steagall (born December 22, 1938) is an American singer, musician, poet, and stage performer, who focuses on American Western and country music genres.

== Early life and day jobs ==
He was born in Gainesville, Texas, United States. He became a bull rider at rodeos while he was still a teenager, but at the age of 15, he was stricken with polio. He took up the guitar and the mandolin as physical therapy to recover the strength and dexterity of his arms and hands. Based out of Amarillo, he formed a dance band, Russell Don & The Premiers making his first recordings (which were unreleased) at Norman Petty Recording Studios in Clovis, New Mexico, in April 1961. Steagall entered a career in agricultural chemistry after graduating from West Texas State University with a degree in animal science and agronomy. After five years spent in sales for Shamrock Oil, Steagall then spent eight years as a music industry executive in Hollywood, and has spent the last 50 years as a recording artist, songwriter, and television and motion picture personality. He currently maintains offices outside of Fort Worth, Texas, where he is involved in the production of motion pictures and television shows.

On December 28, 1974, Hee Haw season six, episode 16, Steagall saluted his hometown of Sanford, Texas, population 181.

== Television and radio personality ==
Steagall made numerous appearances on syndicated television shows such as Hee Haw and Nashville on the Road. He also spent four years as host of the nationally televised National Finals Rodeo, was host of the Winston Pro Tour on ESPN for the 1985 season, and co-hosted the College National Finals Rodeo for the Freedom Sports Network from 1988 through 1991. He was also the host of Western Theater on America One Television.

Steagall currently hosts a one-hour syndicated radio show, Cowboy Corner, on 170 stations in 43 states. Cowboy Corner celebrates the lifestyle of the American West through the poems, songs, and stories of the American cowboy. In 2010, In the Bunkhouse with Red Steagall began airing on the RFD-TV network; as of 2017, Steagall now hosts Red Steagall is Somewhere West of Wall Street for the same channel. His down-home, friendly manner and considerable musical talents make him a favorite of rural America.

== Motion pictures ==
Steagall had a major role in the motion picture Benji the Hunted, which was released in the summer of 1987. He also appeared in the motion pictures Dark Before Dawn and Abilene. He produced the motion picture Big Bad John, starring Jimmy Dean, Jack Elam, Ned Beatty, and Bo Hopkins, and directed by Burt Kennedy.

Steagall is a trustee of the Pro Rodeo Hall of Champions, honorary member of the Cowboy Artists of America, and former board chairman of the Academy of Country Music.

== Musical and literary accomplishments ==
Along with Don Lanier, in 1966, Steagall co-wrote the song "Here We Go Again", most notably recorded by Ray Charles.

In 1974, he discovered a then-unknown Reba McEntire and signed her to Mercury Records the following year. He discovered her while she was performing the national anthem at the National Rodeo Finals competition in Oklahoma City, Oklahoma. Two years later, in October 1977, McEntire released her first album on Mercury Records, and though most of her Mercury albums were commercial failures, in 1984, she picked up with her big album, My Kind of Country.

In March 1993, Texas Christian University Press published Steagall's first book, entitled Ride for the Brand, a 168-page collection of poetry and songs embracing the Western lifestyle. The book is illustrated by Cowboy Artists of America members Bill Owen, Fred Fellows, Joe Beeler, and Howard Terpning.

In September 2003, Texas Tech University Press published Born to This Land, a joint effort between Steagall and Pulitzer Prize-winning photographer Skeeter Hagler. The book contains Hagler's black-and-white studies of modern ranching, accompanied by Steagall's award-winning poetry. The Academy of Western Artists named Born to This Land as recipient of the Will Rogers Award for best book of 2003.

Steagall has won the Wrangler Award for original music five times: 1993 (for his Warner Western album, Born to This Land), 1995 (for the Warner Western album, Faith and Values), 1997 (for his Warner Western album, Dear Mama, I'm a Cowboy), 1999 (for Love of the West). In fall 2002, Steagall released his 20th album, Wagon Tracks, which also won the Wrangler Award from the National Cowboy and Western Heritage Museum.

He released his new album Here We Go Again in August 2007. Here We Go Again features duets with Toby Keith, Reba McEntire, Charley Pride, Ray Benson, Neal McCoy, Larry Gatlin, and Charlie Daniels.

In May 2011, Bunkhouse Press released Steagall's CD Dreamin' of......When the Grass Was Still Deep, featuring eight songs and two poems.

Texas Tech University Press published Steagall’s autobiography in 2024

== Honors and awards ==
The Texas Legislature named Red Steagall the Official Cowboy Poet of Texas in April 1991. Steagall was an early participant in the American Cowboy Culture Association, which holds the annual National Cowboy Symposium and Celebration each September in Lubbock.

Steagall is also the official Cowboy Poet Laureate of San Juan Capistrano, California.

Since 1991, he has hosted the annual Red Steagall Cowboy Gathering in the Stockyards National Historic District of Fort Worth. The event features a ranch rodeo, chuckwagon cookoff, children's poetry contest, Western swing dances, cowboy music and poetry, a trappings show, and horsemanship clinics.

In 1999, Steagall was inducted into the Texas Trail of Fame.

In April 2003, Steagall was inducted into the Hall of Great Westerners at the National Cowboy and Western Heritage Museum in Oklahoma City, joining the likes of Will Rogers, Theodore Roosevelt, Charles Goodnight, and Charlie Russell.

In January 2004, Steagall received the Spirit of Texas Award and was inducted into the Texas Cowboy Hall of Fame in Fort Worth.

In April 2005, he was inducted to the Texas Rodeo Cowboy Hall of Fame in Belton.

He was named "2006 Poet Laureate of the State of Texas" at the Capital in Austin in the spring of 2005. Steagall is the first "cowboy" poet to be named the poet laureate of Texas.

In 2007, he was inducted into the National Multicultural Western Heritage Museum in Fort Worth, Texas.

He was named the 2023 Legend of ProRodeo.

In 2024, he received the Original Wrangler Bullfights Hall of Fame's Supporting Legend Award.

In 2025, he was awarded the Ken Stemler Pioneer Award.

=== Red Steagall Institute for Traditional Western Arts ===
In 2024, the National Ranching Heritage Center in Lubbock, Texas, announced the forthcoming location at the center of the Red Steagall Institute for Traditional Western Arts, which will feature interactive classes and displays for the public to learn about Western culture. The Texas Tech System Board of Regents approved the NRHC's $42 million dollar expansion in May 2024. Jim Bret Campbell, executive director of the NRHC, said that the project comes after Steagall and his wife sought a location to donate his collection of Western songs, poetry, and various radio and television recordings of his programs.

== Discography ==
=== Albums ===
Year	Album	US Country	Label
1972	Party Dolls and Wine	—	Capitol
1973	Somewhere My Love	42	Capitol
1973	If You've Got the Time, I've Got the Song	—	Capitol
1974	Finer Things in Life	47	Capitol
1976	Lone Star Beer and Bob Wills Music	27	ABC/Dot
1976	Texas Red	36	ABC/Dot
1977	For All My Cowboy Friends	—	ABC/Dot
1978	Hang On Feelin'	—	ABC/Dot
1979	It's Our Life	—	Tractor
1982	Cowboy Favorites	—	Delta
1986	Red Steagall	—	Dot/MCA
1993	Born to This Land	—	Warner Western
1995	Faith and Value	—	Warner Western
1996	Cowboy Code	—	Eagle
1997	Dear Mama I'm a Cowboy	—	Warner Western
1999	Love of the West	—	Warner Western
2002	Wagon Tracks	—	Shanachie
2006	The Wind, the Wire and the Rail	—	Wildcatter
2007	Here We Go Again	—	Wildcatter
2011	Dreamin' of.....When The Grass Was Still Deep	—	Bunkhouse Press

=== Singles ===
Year	Single	Chart Positions		Album
Year	Single	US Country	CAN Country	Album
1972	"Party Dolls and Wine"	31	—	Party Dolls and Wine
1972	"Somewhere, My Love"	22	65	Somewhere My Love
1973	"True Love"	51	80	Somewhere My Love
1973	"If You've Got the Time"	41	—	If You've Got the Time, I've Got the Song
1973	"The Fiddle Man"	87	—	If You've Got the Time, I've Got the Song
1974	"This Just Ain't My Day (For Lettin' Darlin' Down)"	93	—	single only
1974	"I Gave Up Good Mornin' Darling"	54	—	Finer Things in Life
1974	"Finer Things in Life"	52	—	Finer Things in Life
1974	"Someone Cares for You"	17	17	Finer Things in Life
1975	"She Worshipped Me"	62	—	single only
1976	"Lone Star Beer and Bob Wills Music"	11	—	Lone Star Beer and Bob Wills Music
1976	"Truck Drivin' Man"	29	10	Lone Star Beer and Bob Wills Music
1976	"Rosie (Do You Wanna Talk It Over)"	45	—	Texas Red
1977	"Her L-O-V-E's Gone"	59	—	Texas Red
1977	"I Left My Heart in San Francisco"	53	—	Texas Red
1977	"Freckles Brown"	90	—	For All Our Cowboy Friends
1977	"The Devil Ain't a Lonely Woman's Friend"	72	—	Hang On Feelin'
1978	"Hang On Feelin'"	63	—	Hang On Feelin'
1978	"Bob's Got a Swing Band in Heaven"	flip	—	Hang On Feelin'
1979	"Good Time Charlie's Got the Blues"	41	—	singles only
1980	"3 Chord Country Song"	31	—	singles only
1980	"Dim the Lights and Pour the Wine"	49	—	singles only
1980	"Hard Hat Days and Honky Tonk Nights"	30	—	singles only
