= Don Lanier =

American songwriter (1936–2014)

- Born: Don Lanier; July 13, 1936
- Died: July 23, 2014 (aged 78)
- Genres: rock, country

Don Lanier (July 13, 1936 – July 23, 2014) was an American songwriter and composer. He composed and wrote dozens of songs for artists including Ray Charles, Dean Martin, The Everly Brothers and Hank Snow. His latest contributions as a songwriter and composer were on Featuring by Norah Jones and on Sugartime by Charlie Phillips. He was the original lead guitarist for Buddy Knox and Jimmy Bowen of The Rhythm Orchids.
