= Ray Sings, Basie Swings =

Compilation album by Ray Charles, Count Basie Orchestra
- Released: October 3, 2006
- Recorded: Mid-1970s, February – May 2006
- Studio: Los Angeles
- Genre: Soul, jazz, Swing
- Label: Concord/Hear Music
- Producer: Gregg Field

Ray Charles chronology
Genius & Friends (2005)	Ray Sings, Basie Swings (2006)	Rare Genius: The Undiscovered Masters (2010)

Ray Sings, Basie Swings is an album that mixes previously unreleased Ray Charles vocal performances from 1973 with newly recorded instrumental tracks by the contemporary Count Basie Orchestra.

Professional ratings
Review scores
Source	Rating
AllMusic	3.5/5 stars

== Track listing ==
1. "Oh, What a Beautiful Morning" (Oscar Hammerstein, Richard Rodgers) – 4:35
2. "Let the Good Times Roll" (Sam Theard, Fleecie Moore) – 2:57
3. "How Long Has This Been Going On?" (George Gershwin, Ira Gershwin) – 6:19
4. "Every Saturday Night" (Jerry West, Silas Hogan) – 4:05
5. "Busted" (Harlan Howard) – 2:35
6. "Crying Time" (Buck Owens) – 3:53
7. "I Can't Stop Loving You" (Don Gibson) – 4:02
8. "Come Live with Me" (Felice Bryant, Boudleaux Bryant) – 4:10
9. "Feel So Bad" (James Johnson, Leslie Temple) – 4:10
10. "The Long and Winding Road" (John Lennon, Paul McCartney) – 4:04
11. "Look What They've Done to My Song (Melanie Safka) – 2:51
12. "Georgia on My Mind" (Hoagy Carmichael, Stuart Gorrell) – 4:40

== Personnel ==
- Ray Charles – vocals, piano
- Directed by Bill Hughes
- Marshall McDonald – Lead alto saxophone, flute
- Grant Langford – 2nd alto saxophone
- Doug Lawrence – 1st tenor saxophone
- Doug Miller – 2nd tenor saxophone
- John Williams – baritone saxophone
- Dave Keim – Lead trombone
- Clarence Banks – 2nd trombone
- Alvin Walker - 3rd trombone
- Barry Cooper – bass trombone
- Mike Williams - Lead trumpet
- Scotty Barnhart – 2nd trumpet
- Shawn Edmonds – 3rd trumpet
- Endré Rice – 4th trumpet
- Joey DeFrancesco – organ
- Tony Suggs – piano
- James Leary – double bass
- Will Matthews – guitar
- Butch Miles – drums

Backing vocals

- Patti Austin
- Maxi Anderson
- Lynne Fiddmont
- Lorraine Perry
- Sharon Perry
- Darlene Perry
- Valerie Pinkston
- Sandy Simmons

Additional musicians

- Wayne Bergeron
- Chuck Berghofer
- Jim Cox
- John Chiodini
- Andy Martin

Technical

- Quincy Jones – arranger
- John Clayton – arranger
- Roger Neumann – arranger
- Larry Muhoberac – arranger
- Shelly Berg – arranger, conductor, musician
- Tom Scott – arranger, conductor
- Bill Hughes – orchestra director
- Aaron Woodward – executive producer
- Bill Airey Smith – engineer
- Bill McKinney – assistant engineer
- Charles Paakkari – engineer
- Doug Sax – mastering
- Don Murray – engineer, mixing
- Eric Weaver – assistant engineer
- Gregg Field – conductor, engineer, producer, vocal arrangement
- Joe Adams – executive producer, producer
- Joe Brown – assistant engineer
- John Burk – executive producer, producer
- Paul "Scooby" Smith – assistant engineer
- Paul Hamann – assistant engineer
- Sanwook Nam – mastering
- Seth Presant – engineer
- Steve Genewick – engineer
