= Live in Concert (Ray Charles album) =

Live album by Ray Charles
- Released: January 1965
- Recorded: September 20, 1964
- Venue: Shrine Auditorium, Los Angeles, California
- Genre: Soul
- Length: 37:45; 75:17 (2011 reissue)
- Label: ABC
- Producer: Sid Feller

Ray Charles chronology
Have a Smile with Me (1964)	Live in Concert (1965)	Together Again/Country and Western Meets Rhythm and Blues (1965)

Professional ratings
Review scores
Source	Rating
AllMusic	3/5 stars

Live in Concert is a live album by Ray Charles released in 1965 by ABC-Paramount Records. The recording was made at the Shrine Auditorium in Los Angeles, California in September 1964 following a tour of Japan.

In 2011, the record was remastered and reissued on CD with new liner notes and previously unreleased tracks, extending the record to over an hour's worth of music.

== Chart performance ==
The album debuted on Billboard magazine's Top LP's chart in the issue dated February 20, 1965, and peaked at No. 80 during an eighteen-week run on the chart.

== Track listings ==
=== Original LP ===
Side A

1. "Opening" – 0:35
2. "Swing a Little Taste" (Julian Priester) – 3:35
3. "I Got a Woman" (Charles, Richard) – 6:10
4. "Margie" (Con Conrad, Davis, J. Russel Robinson) – 2:39
5. "You Don't Know Me" (Eddy Arnold, Cindy Walker) – 3:14
6. "Hide nor Hair" (Percy Mayfield) – 2:57

Side B

1. "Baby, Don't You Cry" (Buddy Johnson, Washington) – 2:35
2. "Makin' Whoopee" (Walter Donaldson, Gus Kahn) – 6:17
3. "Hallelujah I Love Her So" (Charles) – 2:55
4. "Don't Set Me Free" (Agnes Jones, Freddy James) – 3:58
5. "What'd I Say" (Charles) – 4:30
6. "Finale" – 1:55

=== 2011 reissue ===
1. "Opening" – 0:39
2. "Swing a Little Taste" (Priester) – 3:37
3. "One Mint Julep" (Toombs) – 2:58
4. "I Got a Woman" – 6:08
5. "Georgia on My Mind" (Carmichael, Gorrell) – 7:26
6. "Margie" – 2:17
7. "You Don't Know Me" – 3:15
8. "Hide Nor Hair" – 2:54
9. "That Lucky Old Sun" (Gillespie, Smith) – 5:12
10. "Baby, Don't You Cry" – 2:40
11. "In the Evening (When the Sun Goes Down)" (Carr, Ledbetter, Raye) – 6:50
12. "Hallelujah, I Love Her So" – 2:58
13. "Makin' Whoopee" – 6:10
14. "Busted" (Howard) – 2:23
15. "Don't Set Me Free" – 3:49
16. "Two Ton Tessie" (Handman, Turk) – 4:42
17. "My Baby (I Love Her, Yes I Do)" (Charles) – 5:01
18. "What'd I Say" – 4:25
19. "Finale" – 1:56

== Personnel ==
- Ray Charles – piano, Hammond organ (on "One Mint Julep", "Georgia on My Mind", "That Lucky Old Sun" and the intro to "What'd I Say?"), vocals
- Oliver Beener – trumpet
- Wallace Davenport – trumpet
- Philip Guilbeau – trumpet
- John Hunt – trumpet, flugelhorn
- Henderson Chambers – trombone
- James Harbert – trombone
- Frederic "Keg" Johnson – trombone
- Julian Priester – trombone
- Bennie "Hank" Crawford – alto saxophone
- William "Buddy" Pearson – alto saxophone, flute
- David "Fathead" Newman – tenor saxophone
- Leroy "Hog" Cooper – baritone saxophone
- Don Peake – guitar
- Edgar Willis – bass
- Wilbert Hogan – drums
- The Raelettes – backing vocals
  - Gwen Berry
  - Lillian Forte
  - Pat Lyle
  - Darlene MacRae

Technical

- Wally Heider – engineer, recording
- Ray Hearne – photography

== Charts ==
Chart (1965)	Peak position
US Billboard Top LPs	80
