= Modern Sounds in Country and Western Music Volume Two =

1962 album by Ray Charles

Modern Sounds, Vol. 2

Studio album by Ray Charles
- Released: October 1962
- Recorded: September 5 & 7, 1962
- Studios: Capitol, New York City; United Western, Hollywood
- Length: 34:15
- Label: ABC-Paramount
- Producer: Sid Feller

Ray Charles chronology
Ray Charles Greatest Hits (ABC) (1962)	Modern Sounds, Vol. 2 (1962)	Ingredients in a Recipe for Soul (1963)

Singles from Modern Sounds in Country and Western Music Volume Two
- 1. "You Are My Sunshine" Released: 1962; 2. "Your Cheating Heart" Released: 1962; 3. "Take These Chains from My Heart" Released: 1963; 4. "No Letter Today" Released: 1963; 5. "Making Believe" Released: 1963

Modern Sounds in Country and Western Music Volume Two is a 1962 album by Ray Charles. It is the second volume of country and western recordings by Charles following his landmark debut on ABC Records. Following the surprising success of Modern Sounds in Country and Western Music, an album of country music covers, which sold over a million copies, Charles and producer Sid Feller decided to do a follow-up. Unlike the previous album, where slow and fast tracks more or less alternated, this one features one side performed by the Ray Charles Big Band with the Raelettes, while the other side features a string section and the Jack Halloran Singers.

The album has been reissued on CD, coupled with Volume 1, and is also featured on The Complete Country & Western Recordings: 1959-1986 Box Set which also features the first C & W volume and many of Charles' later country recordings.

== Critical reception ==
Professional ratings
Review scores
Source	Rating
AllMusic	5/5 stars
The Encyclopedia of Popular Music	4/5 stars
MusicHound R&B	5/5 stars
The Rolling Stone Album Guide	5/5 stars

In The Rolling Stone Album Guide (1992), J. D. Considine regarded the second Modern Sounds album as superior to the first, "because its balladry is smoother (as with his version of Williams's 'Your Cheatin' Heart') and because the blues tunes rock harder (check his smouldering rendition of Gibson's 'Don't Tell Me Your Troubles')." AllMusic's Richard S. Ginell said it "defied the curse of the sequel and was just as much of an artistic triumph as its predecessor, if not as immediately startling". Robert Christgau, on the other hand, preferred the first volume, writing in Rolling Stone that the second was a "half a step down".

== Track listing ==
Side one (big band tracks arranged and conducted by Gerald Wilson)
No.	Title	Writer(s)	Length
1.	"You Are My Sunshine"	Jimmie Davis, Charles Mitchell	3:01
2.	"No Letter Today"	Ted Daffan	3:01
3.	"Someday (You'll Want Me to Want You)"	James Hodges	2:41
4.	"Don't Tell Me Your Troubles"	Don Gibson	2:07
5.	"Midnight"	Boudleaux Bryant, Chet Atkins	3:17
6.	"Oh Lonesome Me"	Don Gibson	2:10

Side two (strings/choir tracks arranged and conducted by Marty Paich)
No.	Title	Writer(s)	Length
1.	"Take These Chains from My Heart"	Fred Rose, Hy Heath	2:57
2.	"Your Cheating Heart"	Hank Williams	3:35
3.	"I'll Never Stand in Your Way"	Fred Rose, Hy Heath	2:20
4.	"Making Believe"	Jimmy Work	2:52
5.	"Teardrops in My Heart"	Vaughn Horton	3:04
6.	"Hang Your Head in Shame"	Fred Rose, Edward Nelson, Steve Nelson	3:16

== Charts ==
=== Album ===
Chart	Peak position
US Billboard Top LP's (150 Best-Selling Monoraul LP's)	2

=== Singles ===
Song	US R&B	US Pop
"You Are My Sunshine"	1	7
"No Letter Today"	—	105
"Take These Chains from My Heart"	7	8
"Your Cheating Heart"	23	29
"Making Believe"	—	102
