= Modern Sounds in Country and Western Music =

Studio album by Ray Charles
- Released: March 1962
- Recorded: February 5, 7, and 15, 1962
- Studios: Capitol (New York); United Western (Hollywood)
- Genres: Country; rhythm and blues; countrypolitan
- Length: 39:33
- Label: ABC-Paramount
- Producer: Sid Feller

Ray Charles chronology
The Genius Sings the Blues (1961)	Modern Sounds in Country and Western Music (1962)	Ray Charles Greatest Hits (ABC) (1962)

Singles from Modern Sounds in Country and Western Music
- 1. "I Can't Stop Loving You" / "Born to Lose" Released: April 1962; 2. "You Don't Know Me" / "Careless Love" Released: July 1962

Modern Sounds in Country and Western Music is a studio album by the American singer and pianist Ray Charles. It was recorded in February 1962 at Capitol Studios in New York City and United Western Recorders in Hollywood, and released in March of that year by ABC-Paramount Records.

The album departed further stylistically from the rhythm and blues music Charles had recorded for Atlantic Records in the 1950s. It featured country, folk, and Western music standards reworked by Charles in popular song forms of the time, including R&B, pop, and jazz. Charles produced the album with Sid Feller, who helped the singer select songs to record, and performed alongside saxophonist Hank Crawford, a string section conducted by Marty Paich, and a big band arranged by Gil Fuller and Gerald Wilson.

Modern Sounds in Country and Western Music was an immediate critical and commercial success. The album and its four hit singles brought Charles greater mainstream notice and recognition in the pop market, as well as airplay on both R&B and country radio stations. The album and its lead single, "I Can't Stop Loving You", were both certified gold by the Recording Industry Association of America in 1962, as each record had sold at least 500,000 copies in the United States.

The album's integration of soul and country challenged racial barriers in popular music at the height of the Civil Rights Movement. In the process of recording the album, Charles became one of the first African-American musicians to exercise complete artistic control over his own recording career. In retrospect, it has been considered by critics as his best studio record and a landmark recording in American music. According to Robert Christgau, the album "transfigured pop, prefigured soul, and defined modern country & western music." It has been called one of the greatest albums of all time by publications such as Rolling Stone and Time. In 2026, the album was selected by the Library of Congress for preservation in the National Recording Registry for its "cultural, historical or aesthetic importance in the nation's recorded sound heritage."

== Background ==
After his Atlantic Records contract ended, Ray Charles signed with ABC-Paramount Records in November 1959, obtaining a much more generous contract than other artists had at the time. Following his commercial and pop crossover breakthrough with the hit single "What'd I Say" earlier that year, ABC offered Charles a $50,000 annual advance, higher royalties than previously offered and eventual ownership of his masters—a very valuable and lucrative deal at the time. Composed by Charles himself, the single furthered Charles's mainstream appeal, while becoming a Top 10 pop hit and selling a million copies in the United States, despite the ban placed on the record by some radio stations, in response to the song's sexually-suggestive lyrics. However, by the time of the release of the instrumental jazz LP Genius + Soul = Jazz (1960) for ABC's subsidiary label Impulse!, Charles had virtually given up on writing original material and had begun to follow his eclectic impulses as an interpreter.

Following his blues fusion with gospel and jazz influences on his earlier Atlantic material, which had brought him much fame and controversy, Charles sought to experiment with country music. As Charles himself noted in the liner notes of What'd I Say (1959), he was influenced by the genre in his youth, writing that he "used to play piano in a hillbilly band" and that he believed that he "could do a good job with the right hillbilly song today." At Atlantic, he attempted to incorporate this style and influence with his cover of country singer Hank Snow's "I'm Movin' On". Charles later said about the song, "When I heard Hank Snow sing 'Moving On', I loved it. And the lyrics. Keep in mind, I'm a singer, so I like lyrics. Those lyrics are great, so that's what made me want to do it." The "I'm Movin' On" sessions were his last for Atlantic.

Charles's recording of his acclaimed studio effort The Genius of Ray Charles (1959) brought him closer to expressing his jazz and pop crossover ambitions. Described by one music critic as "the most important of his albums for Atlantic", the record was the first to introduce Charles's musical approach of blending his brassy R&B sound with the more middle of the road, pop-oriented style, while performing in the presence of a big band ensemble. Recording of the album, as well his ABC-Paramount debut, The Genius Hits the Road (1960), a collection of place-name songs devoted to parts of the United States, expanded on Charles's thematic and conceptually organized approach to albums rather than commercially successful singles production. Inspired by this approach and his recording of "I'm Movin' On", Charles originally made plans for a single-less concept album.

When Charles had announced that he wanted to work on an album of country music in 1961, during a period of racial segregation and tension in the United States, he received generally negative commentary and feedback from his peers, including fellow R&B musicians and ABC-Paramount executives. The country album concept, however, meant more to Charles as a test of his record label's faith in him and respect for his artistic freedom than as a test of social tolerance among listeners amid racial distinctions of country and R&B. Fueled by his esteem for creative control, Charles pitched the idea of a country album to ABC representatives. Following the successful lobby of the concept and a contract renewal in early 1962, which was linked to the launching of his own Tangerine label, Charles prepared his band for the recording sessions that produced Modern Sounds in Country and Western Music.

== Recording ==
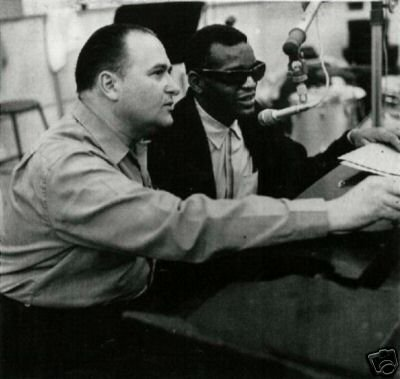
Sid Feller (left) and Ray Charles in 1962

Modern Sounds in Country and Western Music was the 18th overall LP Charles had recorded. According to him, the title of the album was conceived by producer Sid Feller and ABC-Paramount's executives and management people. The recording sessions for the album took place at three sessions in mid-February 1962. The first two sessions were set on February 5 and 7 at Capitol Studios in New York, New York, at which one half of the album was recorded and produced. The other half was recorded on February 15 of that same year in United Studio B at United Western Recorders in Hollywood, California.

Instead of drawing what he should record from memory and his knowledge of country music, Charles asked Feller, his newly appointed A&R (Artists and Repertoire) man, to research top country standards through major country music publishers. Feller canvassed premier country publishing companies, such as Acuff-Rose Publishing (which featured the Hank Williams catalog) and Hill & Range Songs (most of which were located in Nashville, Tennessee). In doing so, he amassed around 250 songs on tape for Charles to consider recording for Modern Sounds in Country and Western Music. From New York City, Feller sent the recordings to Charles, who was living in California at the time, for him to choose. According to music essayist Daniel Cooper:

[Feller] listened to all of them to see which one he could make a Ray Charles record with. A Ray Charles version. Not copy a country & western singer's version. So in other words, by hearing the original, he knew what he didn't want to do. So consequently, he made up his own things, and some of the things he made up, you know, the melodies themselves are interpretations. Some of the ballads, that were so beautiful, he just made it sound like Ray Charles made it up, even though he was singing the exact melody of the original. And yet when Ray Charles sings it, it sounds like a brand new song.

While his selections provided the album's country and western foundation, the musical arrangements represented its contemporary influence. Eager to display his big band ensemble in studio, Charles enlisted premier jazz arrangers Gerald Wilson and Gil Fuller, while Marty Paich, who was active in the West Coast jazz scene, was hired to arrange the lush strings and chorus numbers. Despite enlisting a roster of professional arrangers and musicians, Charles intended to control the artistic direction of the recordings. To indicate specific licks he wanted emphasized for certain songs, Charles would put together voice-and-piano demos and pass them along to the arrangers, informing them of what he wanted to do with specific sounds. According to Feller, at one point during recording, Charles rewrote an entire botched arrangement and dictated the parts to each of the 18 backing musicians.

== Music and lyrics ==
The album's themes are about heartbreak and love, with most of the material chosen by Charles being ballads. The concept which had originally attracted the interest of Charles to this style of music was the strength he admired in writing a ballad's somber or melancholy lyrics and then performing the ballad with aesthetic and emotional stability; an element he had found to be common in even the most diverse musical genres. Writer Daniel Cooper said of Charles's adaptation of country elements, "His country forays play like a series of intricate variations or like one long meditation on the expansive qualities of music commonly described as the white man's blues." AllMusic's Stephen Cook writes that "Charles intones the sleepy-blue nuances of country crooners while still giving the songs a needed kick with his gospel outbursts."

Despite the racial and social implications of R&B and country at the time, Charles did not agree with contemporary views of race records and other genres, including pop and country, as essentially different. In an interview with Ben Fong-Torres of Rolling Stone, Charles said of the similarities between the blues and country music, "[T]he words to country songs are very earthy like the blues, see, very down. They're not as dressed up, and the people are very honest and say, 'Look, I miss you, darlin', so I went out and I got drunk in this bar.' That's the way you say it. Where in Tin Pan Alley will say, 'Oh, I missed you darling, so I went to this restaurant and I sat down and I had dinner for one.' That's cleaned up now, you see? But country songs and the blues is like it is."

In an interview with music historian Peter Guralnick, Charles further elaborated on his understanding, stating "You take country music, you take black music, you got the same goddamn thing exactly." While Modern Sounds features mostly covers of country and western music standards, its sound and musical style are marked by the heavy rhythm and blues influence of Charles's playing. A considerable amount of the material's melancholy lyrics and words are backed by piano and orchestral arrangements that are rooted in jazz, as well as West Coast and Charles's style of piano blues. Charles has said that the country album was "completely different from rhythm and blues".

"You Don't Know Me"
The song is about unrequited love and has a string-laden production.

"Careless Love"
The love song contains horn arrangements and elements of West Coast jazz.

"You Don't Know Me" has a string and vocal ensemble production and themes of desirous unrequited love. The song's narrator longs for a woman that views him as "just a friend/That's all I've ever been/For you don't know me." AllMusic editor Bill Janovitz writes of the song's affecting narrative, stating "The genius, the pathos, and the soul that is Charles oozes into this recording [...] No matter how many times one hears the song, it still induces chills down the spine after the narrator blows any chance he might have had and is left alone at the end."

Both composed by Hank Williams, "You Win Again" and "Hey, Good Lookin'" are derived from Williams's different emotional perspectives. The difference is further accentuated by Charles's interpretations of the songs. "I Can't Stop Loving You", a countrypolitan ballad with lush, cushioned arrangements, was placed at the 11th spot in the track listing, assumed by Sid Feller to be the album's weakest song, after which becoming the album's top-selling single. Charles was disappointed with him, as Feller was in charge of sequencing for the album.

Charles also covered the heartbreak ballads "It Makes No Difference Now" and "I Love You So Much It Hurts", both originally by honky tonk musician Floyd Tillman,. The Ted Daffan-penned "Worried Mind" and "Born to Lose" expand his take on country balladry and feature a blend of piano blues with string arrangements.

== Marketing and sales ==
Modern Sounds in Country and Western Music was released in March 1962 and quickly became one of the best-selling albums recorded by a black musician of the time, as well as one of the best-selling country albums, shipping at least 500,000 copies in its first three months of release. This achievement was due in part to the mainstream promotional efforts Modern Sounds had received from ABC prior to and following release. The album proved to be a crossover hit as well, as distributors claimed the record had been selling in pop, R&B and country music markets; at the time, often referred to as white and black markets during the period.

Writing of the album shortly after its release, Billboard magazine claimed that, "in addition to being powerful dealer material, this package will fracture knowledgeable jockeys who will find in it a wealth of material to talk about as well as play." By mid-April, reports of the album's sales and radio airplay had started coming in from cities such as Dallas and Philadelphia. On June 23, 1962, the mono issue of Modern Sounds replaced the West Side Story soundtrack album as the number one album in the United States, knocking it off the top of the Billboard Pop Albums chart.

The album spawned four charting singles, "Born to Lose", "Careless Love", "I Can't Stop Loving You" and "You Don't Know Me", the latter two of which went number one on the Adult Contemporary chart. The hit singles quickly gained a significant amount of radio airplay on both country and R&B stations. By mid-May, the album's lead single, "I Can't Stop Loving You", had sold 700,000 copies within its first four weeks of release. Record dealers began describing the album as "equal in sales action to some of the early Presley disks" and, after moving 400,000 copies of the single, influential Atlanta record distributor Gwen Kestler told Billboard magazine that "the record is so hot in her district that people who don't even own record players are buying it." "I Can't Stop Loving You" hit number one on the Billboard Pop Singles chart on June 2, spending five consecutive weeks at the top of the chart. By the time it fell off the top, the single was reported to have reached nearly a million and a half in sales, moving over 100,000 copies per week. In July the record spent two weeks at number one in Great Britain.

As Modern Sounds in Country and Western Music and its singles were performing well in the United States, Charles toured Europe with his big band and the Raelettes. He performed both his signature R&B and jazz material at such venues as Paris Olympia and the Hot Club de France, where he was hailed as "a true jazz artist in the tradition of Louis Armstrong and Duke Ellington." Upon his return to the United States at the end of the summer, ABC-Paramount had officially recognized his achievements, presenting Charles with two gold records—one for "I Can't Stop Loving You", the other for his Modern Sounds album—during a live concert performance at the Convention Hall in Asbury Park, New Jersey. Through his ventures into country music and the European jazz scene, Charles's white audience grew significantly at concerts. The album was quickly followed by another recording of country, western and pop standards covered by Charles, and recorded in September 1962. Modern Sounds in Country and Western Music, Vol. 2 was released six months after the first volume and proved to be equally successful, while also earning a gold certification by the following year. Following his tenure with ABC-Paramount, Charles later went on to achieve more commercial success recording country music under Columbia Records throughout most of the 1980s.

== Critical reception ==
Contemporary professional reviews
Review scores
Source	Rating
New Record Mirror	4/5 stars

Retrospective professional reviews
Review scores
Source	Rating
AllMusic	5/5 stars
Blender	4/5 stars
Country Weekly	5/5 stars
The Encyclopedia of Popular Music	5/5 stars
Music Story	5/5 stars
MusicHound R&B	5/5 stars
Q	5/5 stars
The Rolling Stone Album Guide	5/5 stars

Modern Sounds in Country and Western Music received positive reviews from critics of both rhythm and blues and country music. Billboard called it "one of the most intriguing albums in a long time" in a contemporary review, finding its musical concept "wonderful". "I Can't Stop Loving You" earned Charles a Grammy Award for Best Rhythm & Blues Recording at the 1963 Grammy Awards, while the album was nominated in the Album of the Year category.

Since its initial reception, the album has been praised by critics for Charles's style and manner of interpreting country music into his R&B musical language. Robert Hilburn of the Los Angeles Times wrote that the "masterful interpretation of several country standards ... opened a lot of pop ears to country music and showed Nashville much about the proper use of orchestration." AllMusic editor Stephen Cook called the album a "fine store of inimitable interpretations", and stated, "Less modern for its country-R&B blend and lushly produced C&W tone than for its place as a high-profile crossover hit, Modern Sounds in Country and Western fit right in with Ray Charles's expansive musical ways while on the Atlantic label in the '50s". Chris Neal of Country Weekly commented that Charles "recast 12 country favorites in big-band and orchestrated settings with a visionary's easy grace", adding that he "gets to the heart of each [song] in a way that remains thoroughly modern." John Morthland of the Oxford American called it a "landmark LP of transcendent vocals set against kitschy orchestrations that (along with early rock 'n' roll) illuminated black-white roots connections for a popular audience."

=== Accolades ===
In 1999, the album was inducted into the Grammy Hall of Fame, as was "I Can't Stop Loving You" in 2001. Modern Sounds in Country and Western Music was cited by The Recording Academy as a recording of "historical significance". "I Can't Stop Loving You" was ranked number 49 on Country Music Television's list of the 100 Greatest Songs of Country Music. In November 2003, Rolling Stone ranked the album number 104 on its list of the 500 Greatest Albums of All Time, and 105 in a 2012 revised list, and 127 in a 2020 revised list. The album was also included in Robert Christgau's "Basic Record Library" of 1950s and 1960s recordings, published in Christgau's Record Guide: Rock Albums of the Seventies (1981). In May 2026, the album was inducted into the National Recording Registry by the Library of Congress for being "culturally, historically, or aesthetically significant"; the second of Charles's recordings to do so, following "What'd I Say", which was one of the inaugural inductees in 2002.

Publication	Country	Accolade	Year	Rank
Blender	United States	The 100 Greatest American Albums of All time	2002	16
Blender	U.S.	500 CDs You Must Own Before You Die	2003	*
CMT	U.S.	40 Greatest Albums in Country Music	2006	2
Elvis Costello (Vanity Fair, Issue No. 483)	U.S.	500 Albums You Need	2005	*
Fast 'n' Bulbous	U.S.	The Best Albums from 1949–64	2005	85
Greil Marcus	U.S.	STRANDED: "Treasure Island" Albums	1979	*
Pause & Play	U.S.	Albums Inducted into a Time Capsule	2008	*
The Recording Academy	U.S.	Grammy Hall of Fame Albums and Songs	1999	*
The Review (University of Delaware)	U.S.	100 Greatest Albums of All Time	2001	88
Robert Dimery	U.S.	1001 Albums You Must Hear Before You Die	2005	*
Rolling Stone	U.S.	500 Greatest Albums of All Time	2023	127
Stereophile	U.S.	40 Years of Stereophile: The 40 Essential Albums	2002	Honorable mention
Time	U.S.	Top 100 Albums of All Time	2006	*
VH1	U.S.	The 100 Greatest Albums of R 'N' R	2001	97
Various writers	U.S.	Albums: 50 Years of Great Recordings	2006	*
John Tobler	United Kingdom	100 Great Albums of the Sixties	1994	*
Paul Morley	U.K.	100 Greatest Albums	2003	*
Exposure	Canada	50 Greatest Albums not to make the Greatest Albums lists	2005	10
(*) designates lists that are unordered.

== Legacy and influence ==
=== Country music ===
In the wake of Modern Sounds in Country and Western Music and its success, country music experienced an immediate increase in popularity. According to music writer Daniel Cooper, "the album raised the genre's profile", specifically Nashville sound, which Charles had covered. Benefiting from this were songwriters, music publishers, and country singers who covered the subgenre's material. As noted by Cooper, by the end of 1962, Nashville country publishers were being held as "the hottest source of music material in the record business these days." Charles's success with the stylistic fusion of country and soul on Modern Sounds led to similar efforts from artists such as Candi Staton and Solomon Burke, who were greatly influenced by the album. Many country music artists such as Willie Nelson and Buck Owens have cited Charles's take on the genre with the album as a major influence. In an interview for Country Music Television (CMT), Nelson said that the album "did more for country music than any one artist has ever done." Doug Freeman of the Austin Chronicle wrote of Charles's influence through the album, stating:

Country and soul have always had a tenuous connection, undoubtedly exacerbated by the racial identifications of their respective fanbases. Yet despite the perceived disconnect between the two genres, the populist formats of both have always been more fluid and contiguous than is traditionally recognized. Elvis' melding of country and R&B may even arguably be considered the genesis of rock & roll, though that middle ground has largely only served to allow soul and country to remain segregated. With his 1962 Modern Sounds in Country and Western Music, Ray Charles created the benchmark for crossing the line, highlighting the similarities in sentiment often overshadowed by sound.

Summing up on the impact Modern Sounds had on country music and listeners, writer Daniel Cooper states, "There is no telling how many people, who perhaps never paid much attention to country music or even had professed to dislike it, listened anew based on the impact of having heard what Ray Charles was capable of doing with that music." Charles eventually earned a country music repertoire and reputation following the success of the Modern Sounds records, later country hit singles for Warner Bros. Records, and various appearances at country music events, including The Johnny Cash Show in 1970 and the Grand Ole Opry's 58th anniversary in 1983, the program to which he listened as a youth.

=== Social impact ===
Following the album's release, Charles quickly earned an influx of white listeners and audiences at concert venues, without experiencing any fall-out from his predominantly black audience. Writer Daniel Cooper later said of the album's effect, "It's an idea as corny as any country song you can think of, and one that Charles knew to be true; music unites people. It just really does." Throughout the years following its initial reception, Modern Sounds gained further acknowledgment of its impact on the music industry and society. Through conceiving and recording the album, Charles became one of the first African-American musicians to receive and practice artistic control bestowed upon by a mainstream record company. In a 1998 interview, country musician Raul Malo acknowledged the album's influence, calling it "one of the most important records of our time, not only because of its content, but also due to its social and political ramifications." In a July 8, 2004 article for Rolling Stone magazine, music journalist Robert Christgau praised the impact and influence that the Modern Sounds recordings had on music, stating "In the world it created, not only could a black person sing the American songbook Ella Fitzgerald owned by then, but a country black person could take it over. Soon Charles's down-home diction, cotton-field grit, corn-pone humor and overstated shows of emotion were standard operating procedure in American music, black and white."

In addition to its social implications, the musical integration of soul and country into popular format by Charles changed and revolutionized racial boundaries and restraints in music, and contributed to the historical Civil Rights Movement. Robert Fontenot of About.com was one of several writers to praise the album's musical and social implications, stating "Arguably one of the most brilliant interpretive albums ever released, it did more to integrate modern American music than almost any other LP in history." In paying tribute to the magazine's selection of the 100 Greatest Singers of All Time, which had selected Charles at #2, singer-songwriter Billy Joel noted the album's racial and social impact in an article for Rolling Stone, stating "here is a black man giving you the whitest possible music in the blackest possible way, while all hell is breaking loose with the civil rights movement." Another article for Rolling Stone, written in honor of Charles and his achievements, later stated that through his Modern Sounds recordings, Ray Charles "made it acceptable for black people to sing country & western music, in the process doing almost as much to break down racial barriers as did the civil-rights movement."

=== Subsequent work by Charles ===
In addition to the album's legacy as one of the most influential recordings of all time, Modern Sounds also had an effect on Charles's later work. According to writer Nate Guidry, the recording marked the zenith of Charles's popularity and success. By the mid-1960s and continuing into the 1970s and 1980s, the majority of his musical output was focused onto more middle of the road and pop releases, featuring less of his recognizable, trademark soul and R&B, and more of the crossover and fusion tendencies of Modern Sounds in Country and Western Music. On the album's influence, columnist Spencer Leigh of The Independent stated that "Numerous artists followed Charles's lead, but it must be said that Charles himself repeated the trick much too often." The period of releases following Modern Sounds has been recognized by writers as a "critical slide" and the weakest in his recording career. Several of the LP albums from this period have yet to be reissued and have remained rare among record collectors, if not out of print. Charles's final studio album Genius Loves Company (2004) would later be released shortly after his death, and proved to be a comeback success, in terms of sales and critical response, as it quickly became Charles's first top-10 album in forty years and the best-selling record of his career.

On October 27, 1998, Rhino Entertainment issued a four-disc box set entitled The Complete Country & Western Recordings: 1959–1986, which chronicles Charles's country and western recordings. The collection features the two volumes of Modern Sounds, as well as his later country singles for Warner Bros. Included in the set is a hardcover booklet of essays by producer Sid Feller, writer Daniel Cooper, and Ray Charles, along with liner photography by Howard Morehead and Les Leverett. On June 2, 2009, both volumes of Modern Sounds in Country and Western Music were reissued as a single package by Concord Music.

== Track listing ==
All tracks were produced by Ray Charles and Sid Feller.

Side one
No.	Title	Writer(s)	Length
1.	"Bye Bye Love"	Boudleaux Bryant, Felice Bryant	2:09
2.	"You Don't Know Me"	Eddy Arnold, Cindy Walker	3:14
3.	"Half as Much"	Curley Williams	3:24
4.	"I Love You So Much It Hurts"	Floyd Tillman	3:33
5.	"Just a Little Lovin' (Will Go a Long Way)"	Eddy Arnold, Zeke Clements	3:26
6.	"Born to Lose"	Frankie Brown, pseudonym of Ted Daffan	3:15

Side two
No.	Title	Writer(s)	Length
1.	"Worried Mind"	Ted Daffan, Jimmie Davis	2:54
2.	"It Makes No Difference Now"	Floyd Tillman, Jimmie Davis	3:30
3.	"You Win Again"	Hank Williams	3:29
4.	"Careless Love"	Traditional, arranged by Ray Charles	3:56
5.	"I Can't Stop Loving You"	Don Gibson	4:13
6.	"Hey, Good Lookin'"	Hank Williams	2:10

- In October 1988, the album was reissued on compact disc by the specialty record label Rhino Entertainment, accompanied by three bonus tracks.

CD reissue bonus tracks
No.	Title	Writer(s)	Length
13.	"You Are My Sunshine" (from Modern Sounds in Country and Western Music Volume Two, 1962)	Jimmie Davis, Charles Mitchell	3:01
14.	"Here We Go Again" (from Ray Charles Invites You to Listen, 1967)	Don Lanier, Red Steagall	3:18
15.	"That Lucky Old Sun (Just Rolls Around Heaven)" (from Ingredients in a Recipe for Soul, 1963)	Haven Gillespie, Beasley Smith	4:21

== Personnel ==
=== Musicians ===
- Ray Charles – piano, vocals, producer
- Hank Crawford – alto saxophone
- Gil Fuller, Gerald Wilson – arrangements (big band)
- Marty Paich – arrangements (strings)

=== Additional personnel ===
- Frank Abbey – engineering (tracks 1, 3, 5, 8, 10, 12)
- Joe Adams – production (track 14)
- Bob Arnold – engineering (track 15)
- Hugh Bell – photography
- Johnny Cue – engineering (track 13)
- Todd Everett – liner notes
- Sid Feller – production
- Bill Inglot– remastering
- Michael Ochs Archives – photography
- Ken Perry – remastering
- Bill Putnam – engineering (tracks 2, 4, 6, 7, 9, 11, 15)
- Gene Thompson – engineering (tracks 1, 3, 5, 8, 10, 12)

== Charts ==
Year	Chart	Peak position
1962	U.S. Pop Albums	1
1962	UK Albums Chart	6

=== Singles ===
Year	Single	Peak positions			
Year	Single	US Hot 100	US R&B Singles	Easy Listening	UK Singles
1962	"Born to Lose"	41	—	—	—
1962	"Careless Love"	60	—	—	—
1962	"I Can't Stop Loving You"	1	1	1	1
1962	"You Don't Know Me"	2	5	1	9
"—" denotes a release that did not chart.

== See also ==
- Modern Sounds in Country and Western Music Volume Two
- The Blue Room (Madeleine Peyroux album), a 2013 release that includes several songs on this album
- Album era
- Progressive soul
