= Sweet & Sour Tears =

Studio album by Ray Charles
- Released: March 1964
- Recorded: 1964
- Genre: R&B, soul, country soul
- Label: ABC 480
- Producer: Ray Charles, Sid Feller

Ray Charles chronology
Ingredients in a Recipe for Soul (1963)	Sweet & Sour Tears (1964)	Have a Smile with Me (1964)

Sweet & Sour Tears is a 1964 album by Ray Charles. It is a concept album featuring songs with titles or lyrics referring to crying. In 1997, Rhino Records reissued the album on compact disc with seven bonus tracks from his early career (1956–1971) that added to the "crying" theme.

== Chart performance ==
The album debuted on Billboard magazine's Top LP's chart in the issue dated March 21, 1964, peaking at No. 9 during a twenty-three-week run on the chart.

== Critical reception ==
Professional ratings
Review scores
Source	Rating
AllMusic	3/5 stars

Robert Christgau hailed the Rhino reissue as the best of the label's reissue program for Charles' ABC albums, saying both producer Sid Feller and the bonus tracks were suited for the original album's crying theme.

== Track listing ==
=== Side one ===
1. "Cry" (Churchill Kohlman) – 3:34
2. "Guess I'll Hang My Tears Out to Dry" (Sammy Cahn, Jule Styne) – 4:20
3. "A Tear Fell" (Eugene Randolph, Dorian Burton) – 2:45
4. "No One to Cry To" (Sid Robin, Foy Glenn Willing) – 2:43
5. "You've Got Me Crying Again" (Isham Jones, Charles Newman) – 2:52
6. "After My Laughter Came Tears" (Charles Tobias, Roy Turk) – 3:13

=== Side two ===
1. "Teardrops from My Eyes" (Rudolph Toombs) – 3:29
2. "Don't Cry Baby" (Saul Bernie, James P. Johnson, Stella Unger) – 3:09
3. "Cry Me a River" (Arthur Hamilton) – 3:20
4. "Baby, Don't You Cry" (Buddy Johnson, Ned Washington) – 2:40
5. "Willow, Weep for Me" (Ann Ronell) – 4:37
6. "I Cried for You" (Arthur Freed, Abe Lyman, Gus Arnheim) – 2:40

=== Bonus tracks (1997 CD release) ===
1. "My Heart Cries for You" (Carl Sigman, Percy Faith) – 2:51
2. "I Wake Up Crying" (Burt Bacharach, Hal David) – 3:00
3. "Drown in My Own Tears" (Henry Glover) – 3:21
4. "Teardrops in My Heart" (Vaughn Horton) – 3:05
5. "Crying Time" (Buck Owens) – 2:58
6. "No Use Crying" (Freddie Lee Kober, J.B. Daniels, Roy Gaines) – 3:19
7. "Tired of My Tears" (Jimmy Holiday, Jimmy Lewis) – 2:23

== Personnel ==
- Ray Charles – vocals, keyboards
- Gene Lowell Singers – backing vocals
- Billy Preston – electric organ on "No Use Crying"
- Calvin Jackson, Sid Feller – arrangements

Technical

- Bill Putnam, Phil Macy – engineer
- Joe Lebow – design
- Howard Morehead – photography

== Charts ==
Chart (1964)	Peak position
US Billboard Top LPs	9
