= Have a Smile with Me =

Have a Smile With Me

Studio album by Ray Charles
- Released: June 1964
- Recorded: 1964
- Genre: R&B, soul, country soul
- Label: ABC 495
- Producer: Ray Charles

Ray Charles chronology
Sweet & Sour Tears (1964)	Have a Smile With Me (1964)	Live in Concert (1965)

Alternative cover
- 1997 Rhino CD re-issue with Ingredients in a Recipe for Soul

Professional ratings
Review scores
Source	Rating
Allmusic	link

Have a Smile With Me is a 1964 album by Ray Charles. In a reversal of the previous concept album Sweet & Sour Tears, this album is filled with humorous songs.

In 1997, it was packaged together with 1963's Ingredients in a Recipe for Soul (and both sides of the 1965 single "Without a Song") on a two-for-one CD reissue on Rhino with historical liner notes.

== Chart performance ==
The album debuted on Billboard magazine's Top LP's chart in the issue dated August 29, 1964, peaking at No. 36 during a sixteen-week run on the chart.

== Track listing ==
=== Side one ===
1. "Smack Dab in the Middle" (Charles E. Calhoun) – 3:21
2. "Feudin' and Fightin'" (Al Dubin, Burton Lane) – 2:15
3. "Two Ton Tessie" (Lou Handman, Roy Turk) – 4:00
4. "I Never See Maggie Alone" (Everett Lynton, Henry B. Tisley) – 5:46
5. "Move It On Over" (Hank Williams) – 2:40

=== Side two ===
1. "Ma (She's Making Eyes at Me)" (Sidney Clare, Con Conrad) – 3:30
2. "The Thing" (Charles Randolph Grean) – 2:28
3. "The Man with the Weird Beard" (Milton Drake, Al Hoffman, Jerry Livingston) – 3:59
4. "The Naughty Lady of Shady Lane" (Roy C. Bennett, Sid Tepper) – 3:12
5. "Who Cares (For Me)" (Don Gibson) – 2:19

== Personnel ==
- The Ray Charles Orchestra
- Ray Charles – vocals, piano
- The Raelettes – background vocals
- Benny Carter (tracks: A1, A2, B1), Gerald Wilson (tracks: A5, B5), Johnny Parker (tracks: A3, A4, B2, B3, B4) – arrangements

== Charts ==
Chart (1964)	Peak position
US Billboard Top LPs	36
