= Blue Train (Johnny Cash song) =

Single by Johnny Cash

from the album All Aboard the Blue Train with Johnny Cash
- B-side: "Born to Lose"
- Released: 1962
- Recorded: 1958
- Label: Sun

Audio
- "Blue Train" on YouTube

"Blue Train" is a song written by William H. Smith. Originally recorded by Johnny Cash for Sun in May 1958, it wasn't released until 1962, when Cash's long-time former label chose it as the opening track of his album All Aboard the Blue Train and for a single release.

== Composition ==
It is a catchy, bluesy song in the "love and unrequited" vein that predominated in the songs Johnny Cash did at Sun.

== Reception ==
The single failed to chart. According to C. Eric Banister, the author of the book Johnny Cash FAQ, the song "deserved more recognition that it got".

== Track listing ==
7" single (Sun 376, 1962)

1. "Blue Train" (2:01)
2. "Born to Lose" (2:08)

== Covers ==
The song has been covered by a number of artists including Marty Stuart.
