= Ray Charles Greatest Hits =

Greatest hits album by Ray Charles
- Released: August 1962
- Genres: R&B, Soul
- Length: 36:32
- Label: ABC-Paramount
- Producer: Sid Feller

Ray Charles chronology
Modern Sounds in Country and Western Music (1962)	Ray Charles Greatest Hits (1962)	Modern Sounds in Country and Western Music Volume Two (1962)

Singles from Ray Charles Greatest Hits
- 1. "Unchain My Heart" Released: November 1961

Ray Charles Greatest Hits is a 1962 album by Ray Charles. Although many similarly titled albums would be released over the years, this was the first, and it contained many tracks previously released by ABC only as singles.

The album is included in Robert Christgau's "Basic Record Library" of 1950s and 1960s recordings, published in Christgau's Record Guide: Rock Albums of the Seventies (1981).

== Track listing ==
Side A:

1. "Them That Got" [ABC-Paramount 10141a] (Ricci Harper) – 2:47
2. "Georgia on My Mind" [10135a] (Carmichael, Gorrell) – 3:37
3. "Unchain My Heart" [10266a] (Sharp) – 2:52
4. "I'm Gonna Move to the Outskirts of Town" [Impulse 202b] (Weldon) – 3:38
5. "The Danger Zone" [10244b] (Mayfield) – 2:22
6. "I've Got News for You" [Impulse 202a] (Roy Alfred) – 4:28

Side B:

1. "Hit the Road Jack" [ABC-Paramount 10244a] (Mayfield) – 2:00
2. "Ruby" [10164a] (Roemheld, Parish) – 3:51
3. "I Wonder" [10141b] (Gant, Leveen) – 2:30
4. "Sticks and Stones" [10118a] (Titus Turner) – 2:14
5. "But on the Other Hand Baby" [10266b] (Mayfield, Charles) – 3:11
6. "One Mint Julep" [Impulse 200a] (Toombs) – 3:02

=== Notes ===
- A2 was previously released on The Genius Hits the Road.
- B2 was previously released on Dedicated to You.
- A4, A6, and B6 were previously released on Genius + Soul = Jazz.
- A1, A3, A5, B1, B3, B4 and B5 were released only as singles prior to this album.
- All the above tracks had also been released as singles in 1960 and 1961.

== Certifications ==
Region	Certification	Certified units/sales
United States (RIAA)	Gold	500,000^{^}
^{^} Shipments figures based on certification alone.
