= Unchain My Heart (song) =

1961 single by Ray Charles

Single by Ray Charles

from the album Ray Charles Greatest Hits
- B-side: "But on the Other Hand Baby"
- Released: November 1961
- Genre: Rhythm and blues
- Length: 2:52
- Label: ABC-Paramount
- Songwriters: Robert Sharp Jr., Teddy Powell

Ray Charles singles chronology
"Careless Love" (1961)	"Unchain My Heart" (1961)	"I Can't Stop Loving You" (1962)

"Unchain My Heart" is a song written by Bobby Sharp and recorded first in 1961 by Ray Charles and in 1963 by Trini Lopez and later by many others. Sharp sold the song to Teddy Powell for $50. Powell demanded half the songwriting credit. Sharp later successfully fought for the rights to his song. In 1987, he was also able to renew the copyright for his publishing company, B. Sharp Music.

The song was a hit for Charles when released as a single in late 1961. Accompanied by his backup singers the Raelettes, Charles sang about wanting to be free from a woman who will not let him go, with his band's longtime saxophonist David "Fathead" Newman soloing on the instrumental interlude. The song reached number nine on the pop singles chart, number one on the R&B singles chart and was the working title of Charles' 2004 biopic Ray.

== Charts ==
=== Ray Charles version ===
Chart (1961–1962)	Peak position
Belgium (Ultratip Bubbling Under Wallonia)	–
US Billboard Hot 100	9
US Hot R&B/Hip-Hop Songs (Billboard)	1

=== Joe Cocker version ===
Chart (1987–1988)	Peak position
Australia (Kent Music Report)	17
Belgium (Ultratop 50 Flanders)	40
Canada Adult Contemporary (RPM)	18
Europe (European Hot 100 Singles)	17
France (SNEP)	25
Greece (IFPI)	2
Italy Airplay (Music & Media)	20
Netherlands (Dutch Top 40)	26
Netherlands (Single Top 100)	27
Switzerland (Schweizer Hitparade)	15
UK Singles (Official Charts)	46
US Album Rock Tracks (Billboard)	11
West Germany (GfK)	33

Chart (1992)	Peak position
Europe (European Hot 100 Singles)	44
UK Singles (Official Charts)	17
UK Airplay (Music Week)	18

== Notable cover versions ==
- The track was further popularized by British singer Joe Cocker when he named his 1987 album after the song. His version of the song was re-released in 1992 and reached number 17 in the UK. In Australia, the Howard government used Cocker's version to promote the television advertisements for the introduction of the Goods and Services Tax (GST) in 2000.
