= No One Stands Alone =

No One Stands Alone may refer to:

- No One Stands Alone (Blue Murder album), 2002
- No One Stands Alone (Don Gibson album), 1958
