= Rare Genius =

Rare Genius: The Undiscovered Masters

Remix album by Ray Charles
- Released: 2010
- Genre: Soul
- Length: 41:36
- Label: Concord
- Producer: Ray Charles, John Burk

Ray Charles chronology
Ray Sings, Basie Swings (2006)	Rare Genius: The Undiscovered Masters (2010)

Professional ratings
Review scores
Source	Rating
Allmusic (link)	3.5/5 stars
PopMatters (link)	7/10 stars
All About Jazz (link)	favorable

Rare Genius: The Undiscovered Masters is a posthumously created album that remixes previously unreleased Ray Charles studio recordings and demos made in the 1970s, 1980s and 1990s together with some contemporary instrumental and backing vocal parts.

== Track listing ==
1. "Love's Gonna Bite You Back" – 3:54
2. "It Hurts To Be In Love" (Dixson, Toombs) – 4:53
3. "Wheel of Fortune" (Benjamin, Weiss) – 4:00
4. "I'm Gonna Keep On Singin'" – 5:30
5. "There'll Be Some Changes Made" (Blackstone, Overstreet) – 4:04
6. "Isn't It Wonderful" (Taylor, Webster) – 4:13
7. "I Don't Want No One But You" – 4:20
8. "A Little Bitty Tear" (Cochran) – 3:35
9. "She's Gone" – 3:10
10. "Why Me Lord?" (featuring Johnny Cash) (Kristofferson) – 3:57

== Personnel ==
Original recordings:

- Ray Charles – vocals, piano / keyboards
- The Raelettes – backing vocals
- Johnny Cash – lead vocal on "Why Me Lord?"
- others (horns, strings, etc.)

contemporary (2010) additions:

- Keb' Mo' – guitar
- George Doering – guitar
- Bobby Sparks – organ
- Larry Goldings – piano, organ
- Gary Grant – trumpet
- Alan Kaplan – trombone
- Trey Henry – bass
- Chuck Berghofer – bass
- Gregg Field – drums
- Ray Brinker – drums
- Eric Benét – background vocal
