= Ingredients in a Recipe for Soul =

Studio album by Ray Charles
- Released: July 1963
- Recorded: February 6, 1960–April 28, 1963
- Genres: Pop, blues
- Label: ABC 465
- Producer: Sid Feller

Ray Charles chronology
Modern Sounds in Country and Western Music, Vol. 2 (1962)	Ingredients in a Recipe for Soul (1963)	Sweet & Sour Tears (1964)

Singles from Ingredients in a Recipe for Soul
- 1. "Busted" Released: 1963; 2. "That Lucky Old Sun / Ol' Man Time" Released: 1964

Alternative cover
- 1997 Rhino CD re-issue with Have a Smile with Me

Professional ratings
Review scores
Source	Rating
AllMusic	4/5 stars
Record Mirror	4/5 stars
The Rolling Stone Album Guide	4/5 stars

Ingredients in a Recipe for Soul is a 1963 album by Ray Charles. It was arranged by Benny Carter, Sid Feller, Marty Paich, and Johnny Parker, with the Paich tracks also featuring accompaniment by the Jack Halloran Singers.

In 1990, the album was released on compact disc by DCC with four bonus tracks. In 1997, it was packaged together with 1964's Have a Smile with Me (and both sides of the 1965 single "Without a Song") on a two-for-one CD reissue on Rhino with historical liner notes.

== Chart performance ==
The album debuted on Billboard magazine's Top LP's chart in the issue dated August 31, 1963, peaking at No. 2 during a thirty-six-week run on the chart.

== Track listing ==
1. "Busted" (Harlan Howard) – 2:15
2. "Where Can I Go?" (Leo Fuld, Sigmunt Berland, Sonny Miller) – 3:29
3. "Born to Be Blue" (Mel Tormé, Robert Wells) – 2:53
4. "That Lucky Old Sun" (Beasley Smith, Haven Gillespie) – 4:20
5. "Ol' Man River" (Oscar Hammerstein, Jerome Kern) – 5:29
6. "In the Evening (When The Sun Goes Down)" (Leroy Carr) – 5:50
7. "A Stranger In Town" (Mel Tormé) – 2:26
8. "Ol' Man Time" (Cliff Friend) – 2:27
9. "Over the Rainbow" (Harold Arlen, E.Y. Harburg) – 4:09
10. "You'll Never Walk Alone" (Hammerstein, Richard Rodgers) – 4:00

Bonus tracks (1990 CD release)

11. "Something's Wrong" – 2:49
12. "The Brightest Smile in Town" – 2:47
13. "Worried Life Blues" (with Sid Feller) – 3:07
14. "My Baby! (I Love Her, Yes I Do)" (Ray Charles) – 3:04

== Charts ==
Chart (1963)	Peak position
US Billboard Top LPs	2
