= That Gibson Boy =

Studio album by Don Gibson
- Released: 1959
- Recorded: RCA Studios, Nashville, Tennessee
- Genre: Country
- Label: RCA Victor
- Producer: Chet Atkins

Don Gibson chronology
No One Stands Alone (1958)	That Gibson Boy (1959)	Look Who's Blue (1959)

Professional ratings
Review scores
Source	Rating
Allmusic	4/5 stars

That Gibson Boy is a studio album by American country singer Don Gibson, released in 1959.

== Track listing ==
1. "Even Tho'" (Webb Pierce, Curt Peeples, Willie Jones)
2. "It's My Way " (Wayne Walker, Pierce)
3. "Midnight" (Chet Atkins, Boudleaux Bryant)
4. "As Much" (Mel Tillis)
5. "Do You Think" (Lee Emerson)
6. "Didn't Work Out, Did It?" (Dave Rich)
7. "Won't Cha Come Back to Me" (Don Gibson)
8. "I Wish It Had Been a Dream" (Charlie Louvin, Ira Louvin)
9. "Ages and Ages Ago" (Gene Autry, Fred Rose, Ray Whitley)
10. "Almost" (Vic McAlpin, Jack Toombs)
11. "It Has to Be" (Gibson)
12. "Foggy River" (Rose)

== Personnel ==
- Don Gibson – vocals, guitar
- Hank Garland – guitar
- Chet Atkins – guitar
- Harold Bradley – guitar
- Bob Moore – bass
- Buddy Harman – drums
- Floyd Cramer – piano
- The Anita Kerr Singers (Anita Kerr, Dottie Dillard, Louis Nunley, Bill Wright) – background vocals

== See also ==
- Nashville sound
