= Born to Lose (Ted Daffan song) =

1942 song by Ted Daffan

Single by Ted Daffan's Texans
- A-side: "No Letter Today"
- Published: May 29, 1943 by Peer International Corp., New York
- Released: February 20, 1943
- Recorded: February 20, 1942
- Studio: CBS Columbia Square Studio, Los Angeles
- Genre: Western swing, Hillbilly
- Length: 2:41
- Label: Okeh 6706
- Songwriter: Frankie Brown (Ted Daffan)
- Producer: Art Satherley

"Born to Lose"

Single by Ray Charles

from the album Modern Sounds in Country and Western Music
- A-side: "I Can't Stop Loving You"
- Released: April 1962
- Genre: Country
- Length: 3:15
- Label: ABC-Paramount
- Producer: Sid Feller

Professional ratings
"I Can't Stop Loving You" / "Born to Lose"
Review scores
Source	Rating
Billboard	positive

"Born to Lose" is a song written by Ted Daffan. Recorded by his band Ted Daffan's Texans, with vocal by Leon Seago, on February 20, 1942, it was released as a double A-side single exactly one year later, at the height of the Second World War. This was Daffan's most successful record, as well as the most successful release of "Born to Lose"; it remained on the hillbilly chart for 82 weeks. The song has been covered by many artists, including Johnny Cash. Probably the most famous version is found on Ray Charles's 1962 album Modern Sounds in Country and Western Music. Released as a single (as a flip side to "I Can't Stop Loving You"), his recording peaked at number 41 on the Billboard Hot 100, which earned Charles a platinum disc in 1962. Daffan's version of "Born to Lose" sold over one million copies, and was awarded a gold disc by the RIAA.

In December 1938, Columbia Broadcasting System (aka CBS Radio) injected a breath of fresh air into the recovering record industry by purchasing American Record Corporation (ARC), the rights to Columbia, Okeh, and their respective record catalogues and artists. They promptly renamed all Columbia Record Corporation. Though they lost the rights to the Brunswick and Vocalion labels to Decca, Columbia took over for Brunswick, and Okeh was revived to replace Vocalion (and serve as Columbia's Hillbilly and Race label). ARC's former A&R man/producer Art Satherley, one of the best known execs in the business

In the late 1930s, Ted Daffan was working on his song writing and steel-guitar skills, mostly in association with Cliff Bruner and Decca Records. He had just written "Truck Driver's Blues", and was working with Jimmie Davis on "Worried Mind". Satherley, who recalled Daffan from a previous encounter, flew down to Houston and signed Daffan to a recording contract with the Columbia subsidiary Okeh. (Daffan's recordings consisted mostly of self-penned material, which made Satherley uneasy. It wasn't company policy to take so many songs from one writer, so he suggested that Daffan adopt a nom de plume for the purpose of disguising his identity. 'Frankie' was plucked out of thin air, and 'Brown' was his mother's maiden name.)

== 1943 hillbilly music sensation ==
In early 1942, Ted Daffan wrote "Born to Lose" along with "No Letter Today", and recorded both on February 20, at CBS Columbia Square Studio, located at Sunset Boulevard & Gower Street in Los Angeles, California. They were paired on a single, Okeh 6706, but not released until February 20, 1943, due to Columbia's pressing plant being used for wartime needs. Daffan used the pseudonym "Freddie Brown" for the songwriting credits on both the record label and the copyright application, filed on May 29, 1943, by publisher Peer International Corp.

The American Musician's Strike was over six months old, and record companies were scanning their catalogues, looking for unreleased gems to satisfy the American public's appetite for fresh music. This environment created opportunity for two Hillbilly singles that would have been routinely overlooked, Okeh 6706 and 6708, the latter released a few weeks later, Al Dexter's "Pistol Packin' Mama" / "Rosalita".

Although Billboard did not publish its first Folk-Hillbilly chart until January 8, 1944, reports from jukebox operators were published weekly in "The Billboard American Folk Records" column. "No Letter Today" and "Pistol Packin' Mama" both started causing a minor sensation in June, and it grew from there. "No Letter Today" was the hottest jukebox record during June and July, followed by "Pistol Packin' Mama" in August, which stayed on top through the end of the year. "Born to Lose" held the number two position for eight weeks through September and October.

History was made by "Pistol Packin' Mama", as it dominated the popular "Best Selling Records" chart through October and November 1943, which had never been done. It became the first "Hillbilly" record to reach No. 1 on the National chart on October 30, 1943, on its way to selling 3 million copies. In Billboard's 1943 Yearbook, released in September, "Pistol Packin' Mama" by Dexter was the only hillbilly record to join Glenn Miller and Tommy Dorsey in the best-selling record list.

"Born to Lose" finally ended its 82-week chart run on January 20, 1945. It continued to be a favorite of musicians, and it is now a considered a classic. "No Letter Today" spent over a year on the chart with six weeks at number 1. Ted Daffan was a charter member of the Nashville Songwriters Hall of Fame.

== Chart performance ==
=== "Born To Lose" ===
Chart (1943)	Rank
US Billboard National Best Selling Retail Records	19
US Billboard American Folk Records" column	2
US Billboard National Best Selling Retail Records Year-End	124
US Billboard American Folk Records Year-End	8

=== "No Letter Today" ===
Charts (1943)
US Billboard National Best Selling Retail Records	9
US Billboard American Folk Records" column	1
US Billboard National Best Selling Retail Records Year-End	47
US Billboard American Folk Records Year-End	3
