= The Velvets =

Doo-wop group from Odessa, Texas

- Origin: Odessa, Texas, United States
- Genres: Doo-wop
- Years active: 1959–1962
- Labels: Monument
- Past members: Virgil Johnson; Will Solomon; Mark Prince; Clarence Rigsby; Bob Thursby

The Velvets were an American doo-wop group from Odessa, Texas, United States. They were formed in 1959 by Virgil Johnson, a high-school English teacher, with four of his students. Roy Orbison heard the group and signed them to Monument Records in 1960. They recorded in Nashville in Studio B, with the A Team as their backup band. Their first release was a tune called "That Lucky Old Sun". Their biggest hit single was "Tonight (Could Be the Night)", which hit #26 on the Billboard Hot 100 chart in 1961. The follow-up, "Laugh", peaked at #90, and after a half-dozen further singles the group disbanded.

Virgil Johnson, a former deejay at Radio KDAV in Lubbock, Texas, was the lead tenor singer, with backup from Mark Prince (bass), Clarence Rigsby (tenor), Robert Thursby (first tenor), and William Solomon (baritone). The four were originally Johnson's eighth-grade pupils in an English class which he instructed in Odessa in the 1959-1960 school year.

"That Lucky Old Sun" (#46) and "Tonight (Could Be the Night)" (#50) made brief appearances in the UK Singles Chart in 1961.

Their complete recorded output runs to 30 songs, which were collected on one compact disc and released by Ace Records in 1996.

== Aftermath ==
Johnson was later a school principal before his death in February 2013. Clarence Rigsby was killed in an automobile accident in 1978.

== Members ==
- Virgil Johnson (December 29, 1935– February 24, 2013)
- William Solomon (1941–2006)
- Mark Anthony Prince (September 26, 1942– November 11, 2021)
- Clarence Rigsby (1947–1978)
- Robert "Bob" Thursby

== Discography ==
=== Singles ===
Year	Title	Peak chart positions	Record Label	B-side
Year	Title	US Pop	Record Label	B-side
1961	"That Lucky Old Sun"	—	Monument	"Time and Again"
1961	"Tonight (Could Be the Night)"	26	Monument	"Spring Fever"
1961	"Laugh"	90	Monument	"Lana"
1962	"The Love Express"	—	Monument	"Don't Let Him Take My Baby"
1962	"Let the Good Times Roll"	102	Monument	"The Lights Go On, the Lights Go Off"
1963	"Crying in the Chapel"	—	Monument	"Dawn"
1964	"Nightmare"	—	Monument	"Here Comes That Song Again"
1964	"If"	—	Monument	"Let the Fool Kiss You (But Don't Let the Kiss Fool You)"
1966	"Baby the Magic Is Gone"	—	Monument	"Let the Fool Kiss You (But Don't Let the Kiss Fool You)"
