= Genius & Friends =

Studio album by Ray Charles
- Released: September 20, 2005
- Recorded: 1997–2005
- Genre: Soul
- Label: Rhino
- Producer: Phil Ramone

Ray Charles chronology
| Genius Loves Company (2004) | Genius & Friends (2005) | Ray Sings, Basie Swings (2006) |

Genius & Friends is a 2005 studio album by rhythm and blues singer Ray Charles, consisting of previously unreleased duets between Ray and artists recorded between 1997 and 2005. The contributing artists were personally chosen by Ray Charles.

Professional ratings
Review scores
| Source | Rating |
|---|---|
| AllMusic | 2/5 stars |

== Track listing ==
1. "All I Want to Do" (Walden, McKinney) with Angie Stone
2. "You Are My Sunshine" (Davis, Mitchell) with Chris Isaak
3. "It All Goes By So Fast" (Ken Hirsch, Jay Levy) with Mary J. Blige
4. "You Were There" (Ken Hirsch, Ron Miller) with Gladys Knight
5. "Imagine" (John Lennon) with Ruben Studdard and The Harlem Gospel Singers
6. "Compared to What" (Gene McDaniels) with Leela James
7. "Big Bad Love" (Tyrell, Tyrell, Sample) with Diana Ross
8. "I Will Be There" (Walden, Dakota) with Idina Menzel
9. "Blame It on the Sun" (Stevie Wonder, Syreeta Wright) with George Michael
10. "Touch" (Walden, Brooks, McKinney) with John Legend
11. "Shout" (Walden, Hilden) with Patti LaBelle and the Andrae Crouch Singers
12. "Surrender to Love" with Laura Pausini
13. "Busted" (Live) (Harlan Howard) with Willie Nelson
14. "America the Beautiful" (Katharine Lee Bates, Samuel A. Ward) with Alicia Keys
