= Oh Lonesome Me (album) =

Studio album by Don Gibson
- Released: April 1958
- Recorded: June and December 1957, February 1958
- Studio: RCA Studio B, Nashville
- Genre: Country
- Label: RCA Victor
- Producer: Chet Atkins

Don Gibson chronology
Songs by Don Gibson (1958)	Oh Lonesome Me (1958)	No One Stands Alone (1958)

Singles from Oh Lonesome Me
- 1. "Oh Lonesome Me" Released: December 1957; 2. "I Can't Stop Loving You" Released: 1958

Professional ratings
Review scores
Source	Rating
AllMusic	3/5 stars
The Encyclopedia of Popular Music	4/5 stars

Oh Lonesome Me is a studio album by American country singer Don Gibson, released in 1958. It is an example of the beginning of the Nashville Sound. On November 17, 1958, it was rated No. 1 on Billboard magazine's "Favorite C&W Albums" based on the magazine's annual poll of country and western disc jockeys.

The title song reached the Top 10 and also topped the country chart. Its B-side was "I Can't Stop Loving You" which became a standard song for unrequited love.

The title song has been covered many times, most notably by Neil Young as part of the 1970 LP, After the Goldrush. M. Ward and Lucinda Williams performed it in 2009 for Hold Time.

== Track listing ==
All tracks are written by Don Gibson except as noted.

Side One
No.	Title	Writer(s)	Length
1.	"Bad Bad Day"		2:38
2.	"Take Me as I Am (Or Let Me Go)"	Boudleaux Bryant	2:32
3.	"I Can't Leave"		2:15
4.	"I Can't Stop Loving You"		2:37
5.	"Blues in My Heart"	Jenny Lou Carson, Red Foley	2:40
6.	"Sweet, Sweet Girl"		1:53

Side Two
No.	Title	Writer(s)	Length
7.	"Blue Blue Day"		1:56
8.	"Heartbreak Avenue"	Mel Foree	2:45
9.	"We Could"	Bryant	2:31
10.	"Oh Lonesome Me"		2:32
11.	"Too Soon to Know"		2:36
12.	"If You Don't Know It"		2:14

1998 Reissue Bonus Tracks
No.	Title	Writer(s)	Length
13.	"Give Myself a Party" (1958)		2:30
14.	"Who Cares (For Me)" (1959)		2:13
15.	"Just One Time" (1960)		2:03
16.	"Sea of Heartbreak" (1961)	Paul Hampton, Hal David	2:30

== Personnel ==
- Don Gibson – vocals, guitar
- Hank Garland – guitar
- Chet Atkins – guitar
- Velma Williams Smith – guitar
- Bob Moore – bass
- Buddy Harman – drums
- Floyd Cramer – piano
- The Jordanaires, (Gordon Stoker, Hoyt Hawkins, Neal Matthews, Hugh Jarrett) - background vocals
