= No One Stands Alone (Don Gibson album) =

Studio album by Don Gibson
- Released: December 1958
- Recorded: 1958
- Studio: RCA Studios, Nashville, Tennessee
- Genre: Country, gospel
- Label: RCA Victor
- Producer: Chet Atkins

Don Gibson chronology
Oh Lonesome Me (1958)	No One Stands Alone (1958)	That Gibson Boy (1959)

Professional ratings
Review scores
Source	Rating
Allmusic	link

No One Stands Alone is a studio album by American country singer Don Gibson, released in 1958. It was reissued on CD in 2000 by BMG with four bonus tracks.

== Track listing ==
1. "Satisfied" (Martha Carson)
2. "(Prayer Is the Key to Heaven) Faith Unlocks the Door" (Samuel T. Scott, Robert L. Sands)
3. "That Lonesome Valley" (A. P. Carter, Traditional)
4. "Evening Prayer" (Charles H. Gabriel, C. M. Battersby)
5. "Known Only to Him" (Stuart Hamblen)
6. "Canaan's Land" (A. P. Carter, Traditional)
7. "Where No One Stands Alone" (Mosie Lister)
8. "My God Is Real" (Kenneth Morris)
9. "Wait for the Light to Shine" (Fred Rose)
10. "Taller Than Trees" (Lee Ferebee)
11. "Lord, I'm Coming Home" (William J. Kirkpatrick)
12. "Climbing Up the Mountain" (Lister)
  2000 reissue bonus tracks:
13. "Be Ready" (Audrey Allison)
14. "Old Ship of Zion" (Thomas A. Dorsey)
15. "Hide Me, Rock of Ages" (Brantley C. George)
16. "God Walks These Hills with Me" (Marvin Hughes)

== Personnel ==
- Don Gibson – vocals, guitar
- Hank Garland – guitar
- Chet Atkins – guitar
- Velma Williams Smith – guitar
- Bob Moore – bass
- Buddy Harman – drums
- Floyd Cramer – piano
- The Anita Kerr Singers (Anita Kerr, Dottie Dillard, Louis Nunley, Bill Wright) – background vocals
