= That Lucky Old Sun =

1949 song by Beasley Smith and Haven Gillespie

- 1968 French re-release

Single by Frankie Laine
- Published: March 9, 1949 by Robbins Music Corporation, New York
- Recorded: June 14, 1949
- Genre: Traditional pop
- Length: 2:58
- Label: Mercury 5316
- Composer: Beasley Smith
- Lyricist: Haven Gillespie

"That Lucky Old Sun"

Single by Ray Charles

from the album Ingredients in a Recipe for Soul
- B-side: "Ol' Man Time"
- Released: November 1963
- Recorded: 1963
- Genre: R&B
- Length: 3:05
- Label: ABC Paramount
- Composer: Beasley Smith
- Lyricist: Haven Gillespie

Ray Charles singles chronology
"Making Believe" (1963)	"That Lucky Old Sun" (1963)	"My Heart Cries for You" (1964)

"That Lucky Old Sun (Just Rolls Around Heaven All Day)" is a 1949 popular song with music by Beasley Smith and words by Haven Gillespie.

== Background ==
Like "Ol' Man River", its lyrics contrast the toil and intense hardship of the singer's life with the obliviousness of the natural world.

== 1949 recordings ==
- The biggest hit version of the song was by Frankie Laine. This recording was released by Mercury Records as catalog number 5316. It first reached the Billboard Best Seller chart on August 19, 1949, and lasted 22 weeks on the chart, peaking at No. 1.
- The recording by Vaughn Monroe & His Orchestra was released by RCA Victor Records as catalog number 20-3531 (78 rpm) and 47-3018 (45 rpm) (in the US) and by EMI on the His Master's Voice label as catalog number B 9836. It first reached the Billboard Best Seller chart on September 16, 1949, and lasted 14 weeks on the chart, peaking at No. 9.
- The recording by Louis Armstrong was released by Decca Records as catalog number 24752. It first reached the Billboard Best Seller chart on October 14, 1949, and lasted three weeks on the chart, peaking at No. 24.
- Frank Sinatra released his competing version of the song on the Columbia label catalog number 38608. It reached the best sellers chart on October 29, 1949, and peaked at No. 16. Included on his The Best of The Columbia Years 1943–1952 album.
- A recording by Herb Lance peaked at No. 6 on the Most-Played Juke Box Rhythm & Blues Records chart.
- Bob and Alf Pearson in 1949
- Phil Harris in 1949 on the Phil Harris Alice Faye Show, Sep 25, 1949 "Keeping Regular Office Hours"

== Later recordings ==
- Pat Boone on the album Howdy! 1957
- The Buffalo Bills, a barbershop quartet, recorded it as a solo for their tenor, Vern Reed.
- The rhythm and blues singer LaVern Baker released a version of the song in 1955 as the "A" side of a release on Atlantic Records.
- Jerry Lee Lewis recorded an unreleased solo version at Sun Studios in 1956 or 1957 and again in 1989 on the Great Balls of Fire soundtrack album.
- A version by Sam Cooke appeared on his debut LP Sam Cooke (1958)
- Bobby Darin on the album For Teenagers Only (1960)
- The Velvets released their doo wop version on Monument records around 1960/61.
- A version by Ray Charles appeared on his 1963 album Ingredients in a Recipe for Soul. It was also released as a single, reaching No. 20 on the Billboard Hot 100 chart in January 1964. (This recording is also included as a bonus track on post-1988 CD reissues of Charles' landmark 1962 album Modern Sounds in Country and Western Music.)
- Aretha Franklin recorded the song for her album The Electrifying Aretha Franklin (1962).
- Grant Green recorded an instrumental version for his album His Majesty King Funk in 1965.
- Benzion Witler recorded a cover of the song that includes the lyrics sung in Yiddish
- Tom Jones recorded the song on his album Tom Jones Live! At the Talk of the Town (1967).
- Bill Medley recorded the song as a single in 1967, which would later be released on The Righteous Brothers album Standards (1968).
- George Benson recorded the song for his album Goodies (1968).
- Big Mama Thornton recorded the song for her album Stronger than Dirt in 1969.
- Paul Williams recorded a version on the 1972 album Life Goes On
- Jerry Reed recorded a country version for his album Lord, Mr. Ford in 1973
- Willie Nelson recorded a version on the 1976 album The Sound in Your Mind which was also released as an extra track on the reissued Stardust: 30th Anniversary Legacy Edition.
- The Jerry Garcia Band performed a version on the Jerry Garcia Band live album in 1991.
- American R&B and boogie-woogie pianist and singer Little Willie Littlefield recorded a version for his 1994 album Yellow Boogie & Blues.
- Johnny Cash covered it on the album American III: Solitary Man in 2000.
- k.d. lang covered it on the album A Wonderful World in 2002.
- Brian Wilson premiered a song cycle inspired by the song entitled That Lucky Old Sun (A Narrative) at the Royal Festival Hall, London, England on September 10, 2007.
- A duet with Kenny Chesney and Willie Nelson is included on Chesney's 2008 album Lucky Old Sun. This version reached No. 56 on the Hot Country Songs chart, based on unsolicited airplay.
- In Czech by Hana Hegerova.
- Karel Gott in 1964
- Ólöf Arnalds recorded a cover for her 2010 album Innundir skinni.
- Chris Isaak recorded a cover for his 2011 album Beyond the Sun.
- Bob Dylan recorded a version for his 2015 Frank Sinatra covers album Shadows in the Night.
- Crossroads, a barbershop quartet, performed a cover en route to become the 2009 International Quartet Champions.
- Asleep at the Wheel recorded a cover on their 1988 album Western Standard Time.
- Alligatoah, a German rapper recorded a cover on Fremde Zungen in 2018.
- Solomon Burke covered the song on his 1969 album Proud Mary.
- Lau recorded a cover and released it on an EP for their album The Bell That Never Rang in 2015.
- Tommy Womack covered the song on his 2021 album "I thought I was Fine".
- A Finnish rock band The Boys recorded a cover on their debut album Numero 1 (1965)
- Handmade Moments covered the song on their 2019 record "Number Ones".
- Being a well-documented song and publicised by English Folk Dance and Song Society, The Broadside Ballads Project, and Mainly Norfolk, the song was recorded by Oli Steadman for inclusion in "365 Days Of Folk".
