= I Can't Stop Loving You =

1957 song by Don Gibson

Single by Don Gibson

from the album Oh Lonesome Me
- A-side: "Oh Lonesome Me"
- Written: June 7, 1957
- Published: February 7, 1958 Acuff-Rose Publications, Inc.
- Released: December 1957
- Recorded: December 3, 1957
- Studio: RCA Studio B, Nashville
- Genre: Country
- Length: 2:37
- Label: RCA Victor
- Songwriter: Don Gibson
- Producer: Chet Atkins

Don Gibson singles chronology
""Oh Lonesome Me" (1958)	"I Can't Stop Loving You" (1957)	"Blue Blue Day" (1958)

"I Can't Stop Loving You" is a popular song written and composed by country musician Don Gibson from his 1958 album Oh Lonesome Me, who first recorded it on December 3, 1957, for RCA Victor Records. It was released in 1958 as the B-side of "Oh Lonesome Me", becoming a double-sided country hit single. At the time of Gibson's death in 2003, the song had been recorded by more than 700 artists, most notably by Ray Charles, whose recording reached number one on the Billboard Hot 100 chart.

== Composition ==
Don Gibson wrote both "I Can't Stop Loving You" and "Oh Lonesome Me" on June 7, 1957, in Knoxville, Tennessee. "I sat down to write a lost love ballad," Gibson said in Dorothy Horstman's 1975 book Sing Your Heart Out, Country Boy. "After writing several lines to the song, I looked back and saw the line 'I can't stop loving you.' I said, 'That would be a good title,' so I went ahead and rewrote it in its present form."

=== Charts ===
Note: This original recording was released as "I Can't Stop Lovin' You".

Chart (1958)	Peak position
Norway (VG-lista)	2
US Hot Country Songs (Billboard)	7
US Billboard Hot 100	81

== Ray Charles version ==
"I Can't Stop Loving You"

Single by Ray Charles

from the album Modern Sounds in Country and Western Music
- B-side: "Born to Lose"
- Released: April 1962
- Recorded: February 15, 1962
- Studio: United Western Recorders, United B, Hollywood, California
- Genre: Country; countrypolitan
- Length: 2:37 (single version); 4:12 (album version)
- Label: ABC-Paramount 10330
- Songwriter: Don Gibson
- Producer: Sid Feller

Ray Charles singles chronology
"Hit the Road Jack" (1961)	"I Can't Stop Loving You" (1962)	"You Don't Know Me" (1962)

Audio sample
- file; help

Professional ratings
"I Can't Stop Loving You" / "Born to Lose"
Review scores
Source	Rating
Billboard	positive

The song was covered by Ray Charles in 1962, featured on Charles' album Modern Sounds in Country and Western Music, and released as a single. Charles' version reached number one on the Billboard Hot 100 in 1962, for five weeks. This version went to number one on the U.S. R&B and adult contemporary charts. From June 9, 1962 through June 30, 1962, the song simultaneously was at number one on the Billboard Hot 100, Hot R&B Singles and Adult Contemporary (then called the Easy Listening chart), holding a 31-year record for the most weeks it simultaneously topped the pop, R&B and AC charts until January 1993 when Whitney Houston's hit "I Will Always Love You" broke it with five weeks between December 19, 1992 and January 16, 1993. Billboard ranked "I Can't Stop Loving You" as the No. 2 song for 1962. Charles reached No. 1 in the UK Singles Chart in July 1962, staying for two weeks. In Sweden it was the first number one single on the sales chart Kvällstoppen on July 10, 1962.

The Ray Charles version is noted for his saying the words before the last five lines of the song on the final chorus: "Sing the song, children". Choral backing was provided by the Randy Van Horne Singers. It was ranked number 164 on Rolling Stone's list of the 500 Greatest Songs of All Time and number 49 on CMT's "100 Greatest Songs in Country Music".

In 1963 at the 5th Annual Grammy Awards, the Ray Charles version of the song won him the Grammy Award for Best Rhythm and Blues Recording.

This recording was featured in the 2001 film Metropolis, where it can be heard during the explosion of the skyscraper Ziggurat shortly after the climax.

=== Charts ===
Chart (1962)	Peak position
Australia (Kent Music Report)	1
Finland (Suomen virallinen)	1
New Zealand (lever hit parade)	1
Norway (VG-Lista)	4
Sweden (Kvällstoppen)	1
Sweden (Tio i Topp)	1
UK Singles Chart	1
US Billboard Hot 100	1
US Billboard R&B Singles	1
US Adult Contemporary (Billboard)	1

==== All-time charts ====
Chart (1958–2018)	Position
US Billboard Hot 100	125

== Certifications ==
Region	Certification	Certified units/sales
United States (RIAA)	Gold	1,000,000^{^}
^{^} Shipments figures based on certification alone.

== Other versions ==
The song has been recorded by many other artists. Some recordings are titled as "I Can't Stop Lovin' You" (with or without an apostrophe).

- 1958: Kitty Wells on her album Kitty Wells' Golden Favorites; No. 3 on the Billboard country chart.
- 1961: Roy Orbison on his album Sings Lonely and Blue; charted in Variety magazine's Top 100 listing.
- 1962: Ray Anthony recorded the song for the album Ray Anthony Plays Worried Mind.
- 1963: Aliza Kashi on her album A Internacional Aliza Kashi.
- 1963: Sue Thompson on her album Two Of A Kind
- 1963: Count Basie's recording, a Quincy Jones arrangement, won the 1964 Grammy Award for Best Instrumental Arrangement at the 6th Annual Grammy Awards.
- 1963: Johnny Tillotson on his album Talk Back Trembling Lips (MGM Records – E 4188).
- 1963: Paul Anka on his album Songs I Wish I'd Written (RCA Victor – LSP-2744).
- 1963: Saxophonist Boots Randolph recorded an instrumental version of the song for his album Boots Randolph's Yakety Sax!.
- 1964: Faron Young on his album Country Dance Favorites (Mercury Records - SR 60931)
- 1964: Frank Sinatra recorded the song for his album It Might As Well Be Swing, his second collaboration with Count Basie and the Count Basie Orchestra.
- 1964: Jim Reeves on his last album The Jim Reeves Way which was released in 1965.
- 1964: Ike & Tina Turner covered the song in 1964; released on their album Live! The Ike & Tina Turner Show in January 1965.
- 1965: Duke Ellington recorded the song for his album Ellington '66.
- 1965: Andy Williams on his album Andy Williams' Dear Heart.
- 1966: Pavel Novak, Czech singer.
- 1967: Ronnie Dove on his LP Cry.
- 1969: Elvis Presley performed the song live from 1969 until his final tours in 1977, first recording it on the RCA release Elvis in Person at the International Hotel, Las Vegas, Nevada.
- 1969: Jerry Lee Lewis recorded it on the album Sings the Country Music Hall of Fame Hits, Vol. 2.
- 1972: Conway Twitty on his album I Can't Stop Loving You/(Lost Her Love) On Our Last Date; the song reached No. 1 on Billboard's Hot Country Singles chart.
- 1973: Guy & Ralna included a recording of the song on their 1973 album Country Songs We Love to Sing; the duo also performed the song numerous times on The Lawrence Welk Show, on which they were regulars.
- 1974: Donna Hightower recorded a cover in Spain on her Columbia album I'm In Love with Love (also released as I'm in Love with You and The One I Cried).
- 1974: Dolly Parton and Chet Atkins performed the song (to Atkins' guitar accompaniment) on The Porter Wagoner Show in 1974.
- 1974: Johnny Rodriguez covered the song on his album Songs About Ladies and Love. This version is notable as Rodriguez alternates between singing in English and Spanish throughout the song.
- 1977: Sammi Smith covered the song for her Mixed Emotions album. The song also reached No. 27 on Billboard's Hot Country Singles chart.
- 1978: Mary K. Miller reached No. 28 on Billboard's Hot Country Singles chart.
- 1981: Millie Jackson recorded an upbeat, disco-influenced version for her Just a Lil' Bit Country album. The song was also released as a single in the U.S. and charted #62 R&B.
- 1982: Freddy Fender recorded the song on the self titled album, Freddy Fender.
- 1991: Van Morrison on his album Hymns to the Silence; also appears on a limited edition album Live at Austin City Limits Festival (2006).
- 2002: Anne Murray on her album Country Croonin'.
- 2005: Martina McBride on her album Timeless.
- 2014: Bryan Adams recorded a version for his album Tracks of My Years.
