= Busted (Harlan Howard song) =

1962 song by Harlan Howard

Single by Harlan Howard
- B-side: "The Everglades"
- Released: 1965
- Recorded: 1964
- Genre: Country
- Length: 2:14
- Label: Monument
- Songwriter: Harlan Howard
- Producer: Bobby Bare

"Busted" is a song written by Harlan Howard in 1962. It was recorded by Johnny Cash (with the Carter Family) for Cash's 1963 album Blood, Sweat and Tears. It has been recorded by several notable artists, including Ray Charles (also in 1963), Nazareth (1977), John Conlee (1982) and Chris Ledoux (1982).

== Charting versions ==
- Johnny Cash, with the Carter Family, reached No. 13 on Billboard's Hot Country Singles chart in 1963.
- Ray Charles reached No. 4 on the Billboard Hot 100 chart in 1963. This was from his album Ingredients in a Recipe for Soul. In 1964 at the 6th Annual Grammy Awards, Ray Charles won the Grammy for Best Rhythm & Blues Recording for his version of the song. A live version with Willie Nelson was included in Charles' 2005 duets album, Genius & Friends.
- John Conlee reached No. 6 on Billboard's Hot Country Singles chart in 1982.
