= Ted Daffan =

American singer-songwriter

Background information
- Born: Theron Eugene Daffan; September 21, 1912
- Origin: Beauregard Parish, Louisiana, United States
- Died: October 6, 1996 (aged 84)
- Genres: Country
- Occupation: Country artist
- Instrument: Guitar
- Years active: 1930s–1960s

Theron Eugene "Ted" Daffan (September 21, 1912 – October 6, 1996) was an American country musician noted for composing the seminal "Truck Driver's Blues" and two much−covered country anthems of unrequited love, "Born to Lose" and "I'm a Fool to Care".

== Early years ==
Daffan was born in Beauregard Parish, Louisiana, United States. He lived in Texas in the 1930s, working in an instrument repair shop in Houston.

== Music career ==
In the 1930s, Western Swing bandleader Milton Brown convinced Daffan to start performing. Soon after he scored his first success as a songwriter with "Truck Drivers' Blues", one of the first truck-driving songs, a motif which would come to dominate country music for decades.

=== "Truck Drivers' Blues" ===
Daffan wrote "Truck Drivers' Blues" after he stopped at a roadside diner, and noticed that every time a trucker parked his rig and strolled into the cafe, the first thing he did, even before ordering a cup of coffee, was push a coin in the jukebox. He decided to write a song to capture some of the truck drivers' nickels and make himself rich and famous. Recorded by western swing artist Cliff Bruner (with Moon Mullican on lead vocal) in 1939, the song sold more than 100,000 copies.

=== "Worried Mind" ===
It was such a big hit that Art Satherley of Columbia Records gave him a recording contract, and Ted recorded his first song ‘Worried Mind’ on April 25, 1940, at Burrus Sawmill Studio, Saginaw, Texas. It was released July 1940 on Vocalion 05668, then on Okeh 05668. It was also his own composition and sold over 350,000 copies, in spite of being covered by 12 other prominent artists including Bob Wills, Roy Acuff and Wayne King.

=== "Born to Lose" ===
Forming his own band, The Texans, Daffan scored a string of hits, including "Those Blue Eyes Are Not Shining Anymore", "She Goes The Other Way", "No Letter Today", and "Born to Lose", which was also a platinum disc for Ray Charles in 1962. Daffan's version of "Born to Lose" sold over one million copies, and was awarded a gold disc by the RIAA.

=== Other hits ===
"I'm a Fool to Care" was first released by Ted Daffan's Texans in 1940. Its enduring lament, "I'm a fool to care, when you don't care for me", was recorded by numerous artists over the ensuing 75 years. The Les Paul and Mary Ford version went to No. 6 on the Billboard Hot 100 chart in 1954, and was featured in a popular Southern Comfort commercial in 2013. Joe Barry's 1961 swamp pop version sold over one million copies. Ray Charles recorded it in 1965; Ringo Starr included it on his first solo album in 1970; and Boz Scaggs made it the title song on his 2015 release, which went to No. 1 on the Billboard blues chart.

== Retirement and death ==
Daffan left active performance in the 1960s, and founded a Nashville-based publishing house with Hank Snow. He retired to Houston, but retained interests in the publishing business for a time. He died in 1996 in Houston, Texas.

== Discography ==
=== Singles ===
- Conqueror 9697: "Put Your Little Arms Around Me/I'm a Fool to Care" (1940)
- Conqueror 9698: "She Goes the Other Way/Gray Eyed Darling" (1940)
- Conqueror 9699: "Blue Steel Blues/Worried Mind" (1940)
- Conqueror 9700: "Rainy Day Blues/Let Her Go" (1940)
- Conqueror 9701: "I'm Sorry I Said Goodbye/I Told You So" (1940)
- Okeh 5668: "Worried Mind/Blue Steel Blues"
- Okeh 5741: "Crying the Blues Again/Where the Deep Waters Flow" (1940)
- Okeh 6172: "Because/Those Blue Eyes Don't Sparkle Anymore" (1941)
- Okeh 6253: "Weary, Worried and Blue/Too Late, Little Girl, Too Late" (1941)
- Okeh 6504: "I'll Travel Alone/I Lost My Sunshine" (1941)
- Okeh 6542: "Breakin' My Heart Over You/Car Hop's Blues" (1941)
- Okeh 6706: "Born to Lose/No Letter Today" (1942)
- Columbia 37033: "Bluest Blues"/"Look Who's Talkin" (2/20/42)
- Columbia 37038: "Time Won't Heal My Broken Heart"/"Youre Breaking My Heart" (2/20/42, 2/21/42)
- Columbia 37044: "Shadow on My Heart"/"Headin' Down the Highway" (1/10/45)
- Columbia 20077: "Shut That Gate/Broken Vows" (1946)
- Columbia 20103: "Baby You Can't Get Me Down/You Better Change Your Ways Baby" (1946)
- Columbia 20358: "Long John/Lonesome Highway" (1945)
- Columbia 37087: "Shut That Gate"/"Broken Vows" (6/1946)
- Columbia 37267: "You Better Change Your Ways"/"Baby You Can't Get Me Down" (6/1946)
- Columbia 20567: "Flame of Love/I'm That Kind of Guy" (1949)
- Columbia 20628: "That's a Dad Blamed Lie/Take That Leash Off of Me" (1949)
- Columbia 20678: "I've Got Five Dollars and It's Saturday Night/I'm Gonna Leave This Darned Old Town" (1950)
- Columbia 20707: "Ain't Got No Name Rag/Kiss Me Goodnight" (1950)
