= Don Gibson =

American country musician (1928–2003)

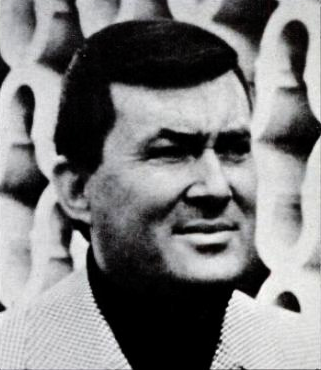
- Gibson in 1970

Background information
- Born: Donald Eugene Gibson; April 3, 1928; Shelby, North Carolina, U.S.
- Died: November 17, 2003 (aged 75) Nashville, Tennessee, U.S.
- Genre: Country
- Occupation: Singer-songwriter
- Instruments: Vocals; guitar
- Years active: 1949–2003
- Labels: Mercury Records, RCA Victor, Hickory
- Spouse: Bobbi Patterson (m. 1967)

Donald Eugene Gibson (April 3, 1928 – November 17, 2003) was an American country singer and songwriter. Gibson wrote such country standards as the ballad "Sweet Dreams" and "I Can't Stop Loving You", and enjoyed a string of country hits from 1956 until the late '70s, including number ones on the US Country Chart with Oh Lonesome Me and Blue Blue Day, both tracks he also wrote.

Gibson was an inductee into the Country Music Hall of Fame and the Nashville Songwriters Hall of Fame, nicknamed "the Sad Poet" because he frequently wrote songs that told of loneliness and lost love.

== Early life ==
Don Gibson was born in Shelby, North Carolina, The youngest of five children, he was born to a family of sharecroppers during the Depression. His father, Solon Gibson, worked for the railroad and died when Don was two years old. His mother, Mary, later remarried and the family eventually made living as sharecroppers. Gibson disliked farm work from an early age and sought to distance himself from the life of agricultural labor.

Gibson stopped attending school regularly after the second grade, a decision he later regretted. He subsequently became an avid reader, reportedly in part to compensate for his limited formal education. He was also notably shy throughout his childhood and youth and had a pronounced stutter. He was self-conscious about his appearance and voice and would sometimes avoid entering crowded places.

Music became an important form of escape for Gibson. He frequented a local pool hall, where he listened to country music, and also heard country performers on the radio. At the age of 14, he bought an inexpensive guitar and began teaching himself to play. Among the performers whose songs he learned were Red Foley and Tennessee Ernie Ford. His early musical development was largely informal, based on listening, imitation, and practice rather than formal musical training.

== Career ==
Gibson's first band was called Sons of the Soil, with whom he made his first recording for Mercury Records in 1949. In 1957, he journeyed to Nashville to work with producer Chet Atkins and record his self-penned songs "Oh Lonesome Me" and "I Can't Stop Loving You" for RCA Victor. The afternoon session resulted in a double-sided hit on both the country and pop charts. "Oh Lonesome Me" set the pattern for a long series of other RCA hits. "Blue Blue Day", recorded prior to "Oh, Lonesome Me" was a number-une hit in 1958. His later singles included "Look Who's Blue" (1958), "Don't Tell Me Your Troubles" (1959), "Sea of Heartbreak" (1961), "Lonesome No. 1", "I Can Mend Your Broken Heart" (1962), and "Woman (Sensuous Woman)", a number-one country hit in 1972.

Gibson recorded a series of successful duets with Dottie West in the late 1960s and early 1970s, the most successful of which were the number-two country hit "Rings of Gold" (1969) and the top-10 hit "There's a Story Goin' Round" (1970). West and Gibson released an album together in 1969, titled Dottie and Don. He also recorded several duets with Sue Thompson, among these being the top-40 hits "I Think They Call It Love" (1972), "Good Old Fashioned Country Love" (1974), and "Oh, How Love Changes" (1975).

His song "I Can't Stop Loving You" has been recorded by over 700 artists, most notably by Ray Charles in 1962. He also wrote and recorded "Sweet Dreams", a song that became a major 1963 crossover hit for Patsy Cline. Roy Orbison was a fan of Gibson's songwriting, and in 1967, he recorded an album of his songs simply titled Roy Orbison Sings Don Gibson. Gibson's wide appeal was also shown in Neil Young's recorded version of "Oh Lonesome Me" on his 1970 album, After the Gold Rush, which is one of the few songs Young has recorded that he did not write.

== Personal life and death ==
Gibson married Polly Bratcher prior to 1958. He married Bobbi Patterson in 1967.

He died of natural causes on November 17, 2003.

== Legacy ==
Gibson was inducted into the Nashville Songwriters Hall of Fame in 1973. In 2001, he was inducted into the Country Music Hall of Fame and the North Carolina Music Hall of Fame in 2010.

=== The Don Gibson Theater ===
Located in Cleveland County, North Carolina, the Don Gibson Theater opened in November 2009 in historic uptown Shelby. Originally constructed in 1939, the renovated art deco gem features an exhibit of the life and accomplishments of singer-songwriter Don Gibson, an intimate 400-seat music hall, and adjoining function space that can accommodate up to 275 people. The theater showcases a busy schedule of premier musical performances. Past performers have included Marty Stuart, Pam Tillis, Tom Paxton, Ralph Stanley, Vince Gill, Ricky Skaggs, John Oates, and Gene Watson.

== Discography ==
=== Albums ===
Year	Album	Chart Positions		Label
Year	Album	US Country	US	Label
1958	Songs by Don Gibson	—	—	Lion
1958	Oh Lonesome Me	—	—	RCA
1959	No One Stands Alone	—	—	RCA
1959	That Gibson Boy	—	—	RCA
1960	Look Who's Blue	—	—	RCA
1960	Sweet Dreams	—	—	RCA
1961	Girls, Guitars and Gibson	—	—	RCA
1962	Some Favorites of Mine	—	—	RCA
1964	I Wrote a Song	14	134	RCA
1964	God Walks These Hills	—	—	RCA
1965	A Blue Million Tears	—	—	RCA
1965	The Best of Don Gibson	—	—	RCA
1965	Too Much Hurt	13	—	RCA
1966	Don Gibson with Spanish Guitars	4	—	RCA
1966	Great Country Songs	14	—	RCA
1967	All My Love	19	—	RCA
1968	The King of Country Soul	21	—	RCA
1968	More Country Soul	26	—	RCA
1969	Dottie and Don (with Dottie West)	21	—	RCA
1969	Don Gibson Sings All-Time Country Gold	17	—	RCA
1970	The Best of Don Gibson 2	—	—	RCA
1970	Hits, The Don Gibson Way	39	—	Hickory
1970	A Perfect Mountain	—	—	Hickory
1971	Hank Williams as Sung by Don Gibson	—	—	Hickory
1971	Country Green	17	—	Hickory
1972	Woman (Sensuous Woman)	16	—	Hickory
1972	The Two of Us Together (with Sue Thompson)	—	—	Hickory
1973	Touch the Morning / That's What I'll Do	26	—	Hickory/MGM
1974	Snap Your Fingers	21	—	Hickory/MGM
1974	The Very Best of Don Gibson	30	—	Hickory/MGM
1974	Bring Back Your Love to Me	38	—	Hickory/MGM
1975	I'm the Loneliest Man	47	—	Hickory/MGM
1975	Oh, How Love Changes (with Sue Thompson)	43	—	Hickory/MGM
1975	Don't Stop Loving Me	—	—	Hickory/MGM
1976	I'm All Wrapped Up in You	—	—	Hickory/MGM
1977	If You Ever Get to Houston	—	—	Hickory/MGM
1978	Starting All Over Again	—	—	Hickory/MGM
1978	Look Who's Blue	—	—	Hickory/MGM

=== Singles ===
Year	Single	Chart Positions			Album
Year	Single	US Country	US	CAN Country	Album
1956	"Sweet Dreams"	9	—	—	single only
1958	"Oh Lonesome Me"	1	7	—	Oh Lonesome Me
1958	"I Can't Stop Lovin' You"	7	81	—	Oh Lonesome Me
1958	"Blue Blue Day"	1	20	—	Oh Lonesome Me
1958	"Give Myself a Party"	5	46	—	I Wrote a Song
1958	"Look Who's Blue"	8	58	—	singles only
1959	"Who Cares"	3	43	—	singles only
1959	"A Stranger to Me"	27	—	—	singles only
1959	"Lonesome Old House"	11	71	—	singles only
1959	"Don't Tell Me Your Troubles"	5	85	—	I Wrote a Song
1959	"Heartbreak Avenue"	—	—	—	Oh, Lonesome Me
1959	"I'm Movin' On"	14	—	—	single only
1960	"Big Hearted Me"	29	—	—	Look Who's Blue
1960	"Just One Time"	2	29	—	Look Who's Blue
1960	"Far, Far Away"	11	72	—	Sweet Dreams
1960	"Sweet Dreams" (re-recording)	6	93	—	Sweet Dreams
1961	"What About Me"	22	100	—	Sweet Dreams
1961	"The World Is Waiting for the Sunrise"	—	108	—	Sweet Dreams
1961	"Sea of Heartbreak"	2	21	—	The Best of Don Gibson
1961	"I Think It's Best"	—	—	—	Girls, Guitars and Gibson
1961	"Lonesome Number One"	2	59	—	I Wrote a Song
1961	"The Same Old Trouble"	—	—	—	singles only
1962	"I Can Mend Your Broken Heart"	5	105	—	singles only
1962	"So How Come (No One Loves Me)"	22	—	—	singles only
1963	"Head Over Heels in Love with You"	12	—	—	singles only
1963	"It Was Worth It All"	—	—	—	singles only
1963	"Anything New Gets Old (Except My Love for You)"	22	—	—	I Wrote a Song
1964	"Oh Such a Stranger"	—	—	—	I Wrote a Song
1964	"Cause I Believe in You"	23	—	—	singles only
1965	"Again"	19	—	—	singles only
1965	"Watch Where You're Going"	10	—	—	singles only
1966	"A Born Loser"	12	—	—	Great Country Songs
1966	"(Yes) I'm Hurting"	6	—	—	Great Country Songs
1966	"Funny, Familiar, Forgotten Feelings"	8	—	—	More Country Soul
1967	"Lost Highway"	51	—	—	Great Country Songs
1967	"All My Love"	23	—	—	All My Love
1968	"Ashes of Love"	37	—	—	The King of Country Soul
1968	"Good Morning, Dear"	71	—	—	The King of Country Soul
1968	"It's a Long, Long Way to Georgia"	12	—	20	More Country Soul
1968	"Ever Changing Mind"	30	—	—	singles only
1969	"Solitary"	28	—	—	The Best of Don Gibson 2
1969	"I Will Always"	21	—	—	singles only
1969	"There's a Story (Goin' 'Round)" (with Dottie West)	7	—	—	singles only
1970	"Don't Take All Your Loving"	17	—	31	A Perfect Mountain
1970	"A Perfect Mountain"	16	—	—	A Perfect Mountain
1970	"Someway"	37	—	31	Country Green
1971	"Guess Away the Blues"	19	—	4	Country Green
1971	"(I Heard That) Lonesome Whistle"	29	—	29	Hank Williams as Sung by Don Gibson
1971	"Country Green"	5	—	7	Country Green
1972	"Far, Far Away" (re-recording)	12	—	6	Woman (Sensuous Woman)
1972	"Woman (Sensuous Woman)"	1	—	1	Woman (Sensuous Woman)
1972	"Is This the Best I'm Gonna Feel"	11	—	3	Woman (Sensuous Woman)
1973	"If You're Goin' Girl"	26	—	9	Touch the Morning / That's What I'll Do
1973	"Touch the Morning"	6	—	5	Touch the Morning / That's What I'll Do
1973	"That's What I'll Do"	30	—	83	Touch the Morning / That's What I'll Do
1973	"Snap Your Fingers"	12	—	23	Snap Your Fingers
1974	"One Day at a Time"	8	—	30	Snap Your Fingers
1974	"Good Old Fashioned Country Love" (with Sue Thompson)	31	—	29	single only
1974	"Bring Back Your Love to Me"	9	—	14	Bring Back Your Love to Me
1975	"I'll Sing for You"	27	—	—	Bring Back Your Love to Me
1975	"(There She Goes) I Wish Her Well"	24	—	48	I'm the Loneliest Man
1975	"Don't Stop Loving Me"	43	—	—	Don't Stop Loving Me
1975	"I Don't Think I'll Ever (Get Over You)"	76	—	—	Don't Stop Loving Me
1976	"You've Got to Stop Hurting Me Darling"	79	—	—	Don't Stop Loving Me
1976	"Doing My Time"	39	—	—	I'm All Wrapped Up in You
1976	"I'm All Wrapped Up in You"	23	—	—	I'm All Wrapped Up in You
1977	"Fan the Flame, Feed the Fire"	30	—	—	If You Ever Get to Houston
1977	"If You Ever Get to Houston (Look Me Down)"	16	—	—	If You Ever Get to Houston
1977	"When Do We Stop Starting Over"	67	—	—	If You Ever Get to Houston
1978	"Starting All Over Again"	16	—	—	Starting All Over Again
1978	"The Fool"	22	—	—	Starting All Over Again
1978	"Oh, Such a Stranger"	61	—	—	Look Who's Blue
1978	"I Love You Because"	flip	—	—	Look Who's Blue
1978	"Any Day Now"	26	—	31	Look Who's Blue
1979	"Forever One Day at a Time"	37	—	33	singles only
1980	"Sweet Sensuous Sensations"	42	—	—	singles only
1980	"I'd Be Crazy Over You"	—	—	—	singles only
1980	"Love Fires"	80	—	—	singles only

=== Singles from collaboration albums ===
Year	Single	Artist	Chart Positions		Album
Year	Single	Artist	US Country	CAN Country	Album
1969	"Rings of Gold"	Dottie West	2	1	Dottie & Don
1969	"Sweet Memories"	Dottie West	32	—	Dottie & Don
1970	"Till I Can't Take It Anymore"	Dottie West	46	—	Dottie & Don
1971	"The Two of Us Together"	Sue Thompson	50	—	The Two of Us Together
1972	"Did You Ever Think"	Sue Thompson	71	—	The Two of Us Together
1972	"I Think They Call It Love"	Sue Thompson	37	—	The Two of Us Together
1972	"Cause I Love You"	Sue Thompson	64	—	The Two of Us Together
1973	"Go with Me"	Sue Thompson	52	49	The Two of Us Together
1973	"Warm Love"	Sue Thompson	53	52	The Two of Us Together
1975	"No One Will Ever Know"	Sue Thompson	—	—	Oh, How Love Changes
1975	"Oh, How Love Changes"	Sue Thompson	36	—	Oh, How Love Changes
1975	"Maybe Tomorrow"	Sue Thompson	—	—	Oh, How Love Changes
1976	"Get Ready-Here I Come"	Sue Thompson	98	—	Oh, How Love Changes
1976	"Let's Get Together"	Sue Thompson	—	—	Oh, How Love Changes

== Other sources ==
- Wolfe, Stacey (1998). "Don Gibson". In The Encyclopedia of Country Music. Paul Kingsbury, Editor. New York: Oxford University Press. p. 199.
