= Sid Feller =

American musician (1916–2006)

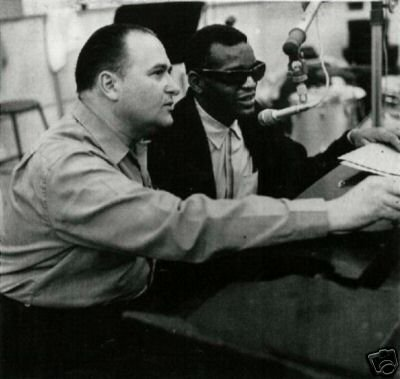
(Photo courtesy of Jane Feller) Sid Feller with Ray Charles - ca 1962

Sidney Feller (December 24, 1916 – February 16, 2006) was an American conductor and arranger, best known for his work with Ray Charles. He worked with Charles on hundreds of songs including Georgia on My Mind and worked as Charles' conductor while on tour. Ray Charles once said of him "if they call me a genius, then Sid Feller is Einstein." [739.ece]

== Early career ==
Feller learned how to play the trumpet while a member of the Boy Scouts of America and also played the piano. He started playing as a member of local bands around New York City in the late 1930s and his career as an arranger started around that time. Feller worked with Jack Teagarden in 1940 before joining the US Army as a musician.

After the war, he worked with Teagarden again before joining Carmen Cavallaro's band in 1949. He joined Capitol Records where he worked as a conductor and arranger. During this period, he worked on records by Elvis Presley, Dean Martin, Peggy Lee, Matt Monro, Mel Tormé, Sandler and Young, Dakota Staton, Donna Hightower, Nancy Wilson and Jackie Gleason.

Feller joined a new record label, ABC-Paramount, in 1955, where he worked with Paul Anka, Eydie Gorme and Steve Lawrence. He also recorded three albums of his own: Music for Expectant Mothers, Music to Break a Lease By and More Music to Break a Lease By.

== Work with Ray Charles ==
Feller met Ray Charles when Charles left Atlantic Records for ABC-Paramount. Their first album together was The Genius Hits the Road featuring "Georgia on My Mind". He also played a significant role in developing Modern Sounds in Country and Western Music. Charles recalled: 'Sid researched the hell out of it and came up with 250 tunes. I picked the ones I liked, and of the ones I picked, they were all new to me except "Bye Bye, Love".' Amongst the songs they recorded was "I Can't Stop Loving You" which would become Charles' biggest hit. Ironically, Feller was skeptical about the market for a pop singer covering country songs. Feller worked with Charles for 30 years, both on record and on tour as a conductor.

== Subsequent career ==
In 1965, Feller moved his wife and four children to California where he worked as a freelancer. He was conductor/arranger on Doris Day's The Love Album, recorded in 1967. He worked as the musical arranger for The Flip Wilson Show in the early 1970s and on specials for John Denver, Andy Williams, Sandler and Young and Pat Boone amongst others. He also produced Broadway soundtrack albums. He finally retired after a heart attack in the late 1990s and moved to Ohio to be near one of his daughters.

Feller died in 2006. He was survived by his wife Gert; his daughters Lois, Debbie, and Jane; and son Bill.
