= Prince Poppycock =

American singer

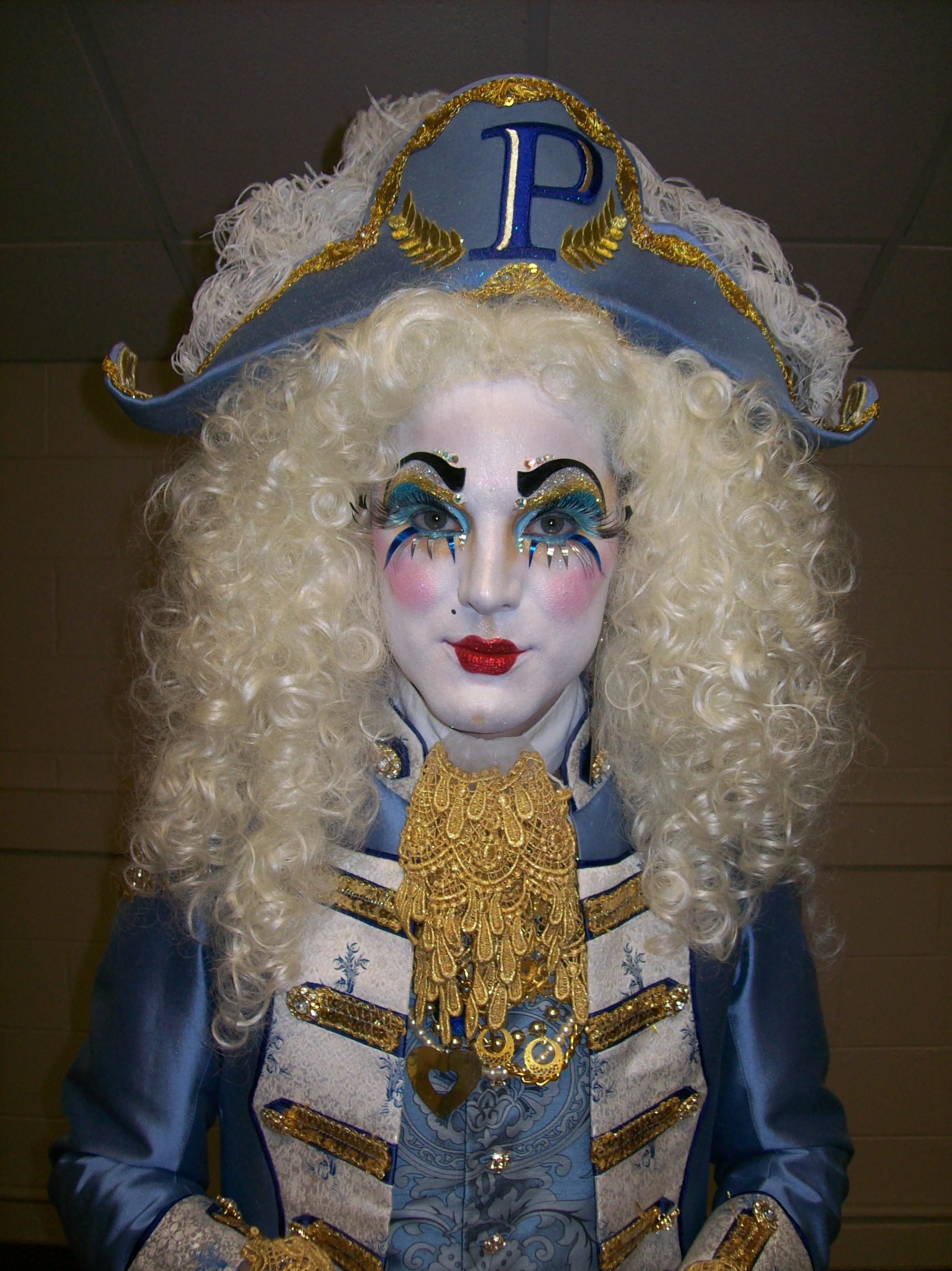
- Poppycock at America's Got Talent tour stop in Greensboro, North Carolina, in November 2010

Background information
- Also known as: Prince Poppycock
- Born: John Andrew Quale
- Origin: Great Falls, Virginia, U.S.
- Genres: Musical theater, opera, pop, rock
- Occupations: Singer, songwriter, performer
- Instruments: Vocals, piano
- Years active: 1980s–present

John Andrew Quale is an American singer, songwriter, and performer best known by the stage name and persona of Prince Poppycock. Quale, who specializes in musical theater and opera, describes Prince Poppycock on his website as a "roguish operatic dandy."

Poppycock came to national attention in 2010 when he competed on the fifth season of America's Got Talent. On September 15, 2010, he was voted fourth place in the final four.

== Early life and career ==
As a child, Quale sang "incessantly" and was a member of several children's choirs. His first public performance was at age 11 at Kennedy Center in the Children's Choir of the Washington National Opera. In his teenage years, Quale developed a love for writing music and became "enamored" with David Bowie, Depeche Mode, opera, madrigals, Gregorian chant, the Smiths and Gilbert and Sullivan. He also began recording his own music. While in high school, he spent several summers at Interlochen Arts Camp, a competitive performing arts program of the Interlochen Center for the Arts. Quale performed and toured with musicals and choirs throughout high school and college. In December 2001, Quale joined Chicago synth-pop band Endora as lead singer and songwriter. Quale moved to Los Angeles around 2005 and studied musical theatre at the Beverly Hills Playhouse. Quale wrote and released a solo album, Worldview, and was one of several young gay performing artists profiled in Brian Gleason's documentary Rise Up and Shout!.

Quale played the role of Jesus in the musical The Beastly Bombing, which won the LA Weekly Theater Award for Best Musical and enjoyed two short runs off-Broadway in New York City. He also performed and entertained at La Belle Epoque, with Ann Magnuson at Redcat, and has opened for The Dresden Dolls, Club Dandy, Wig Out, Dirty Deeds and Jer Ber Jones. Quale has studied voice for several years with Derek Graydon. Additionally, Quale has been collaborating with Kristian Hoffman, songwriter for The Mumps and Klaus Nomi, on a rock album entitled The Solipsist's Soliloquy.

Recently, John showed his support for the Trevor Project, a nationwide non-profit organization focused on suicide prevention efforts among lesbian, gay, bisexual, transgender and questioning (LGBTQ) youth, through his "It Gets Better" video.

Quale developed the Prince Poppycock character, an opera singer who performs in the elaborate dress of a baroque dandy, in 2006 so he could perform in a Los Angeles nightclub show. Quale was studying opera and had completed learning the Figaro baritone aria "Largo al factotum" from The Barber of Seville. A friend asked Quale to perform but stipulated he must wear a wig; he decided to perform as a "powdered-wigged baroque dandy, and highlight how the song was about being a fabulous hairdresser".

Poppycock "is my mask," says Quale in People Magazine. "Give a man a mask and he will tell you the truth, in the style of Commedia dell'arte." The New York Post noted Poppycock embodies the sensibility of "humor, irony and sarcasm". He wears elaborate costuming and "dresses as if he stepped out of a French Baroque painting (pantaloons, powdered wig and pasty makeup)." His face is matted with whiteface (or white clown) a symbol of the highest status in the clown hierarchy and the oldest of modern clown archetypes.

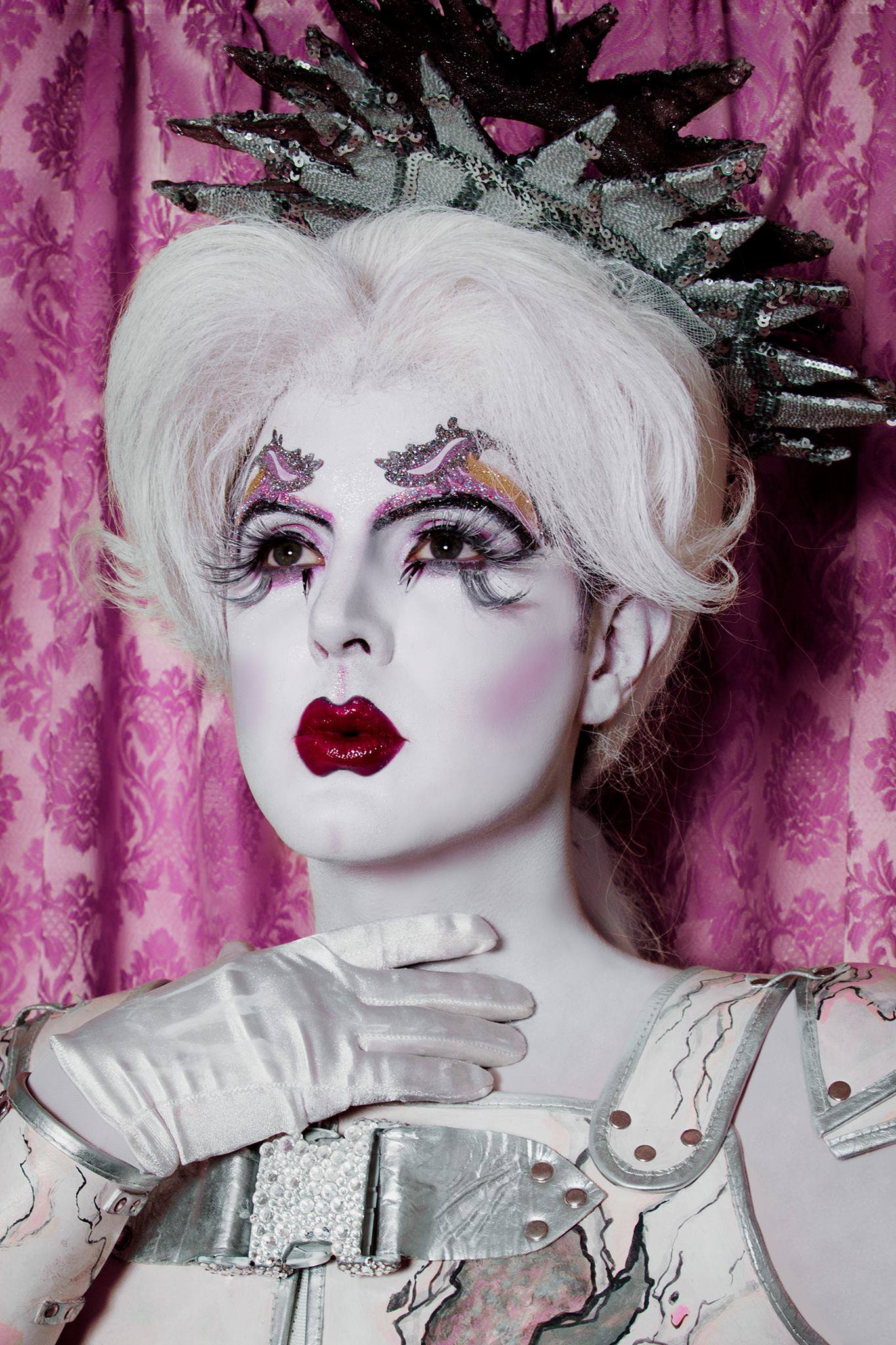
Prince Poppycock

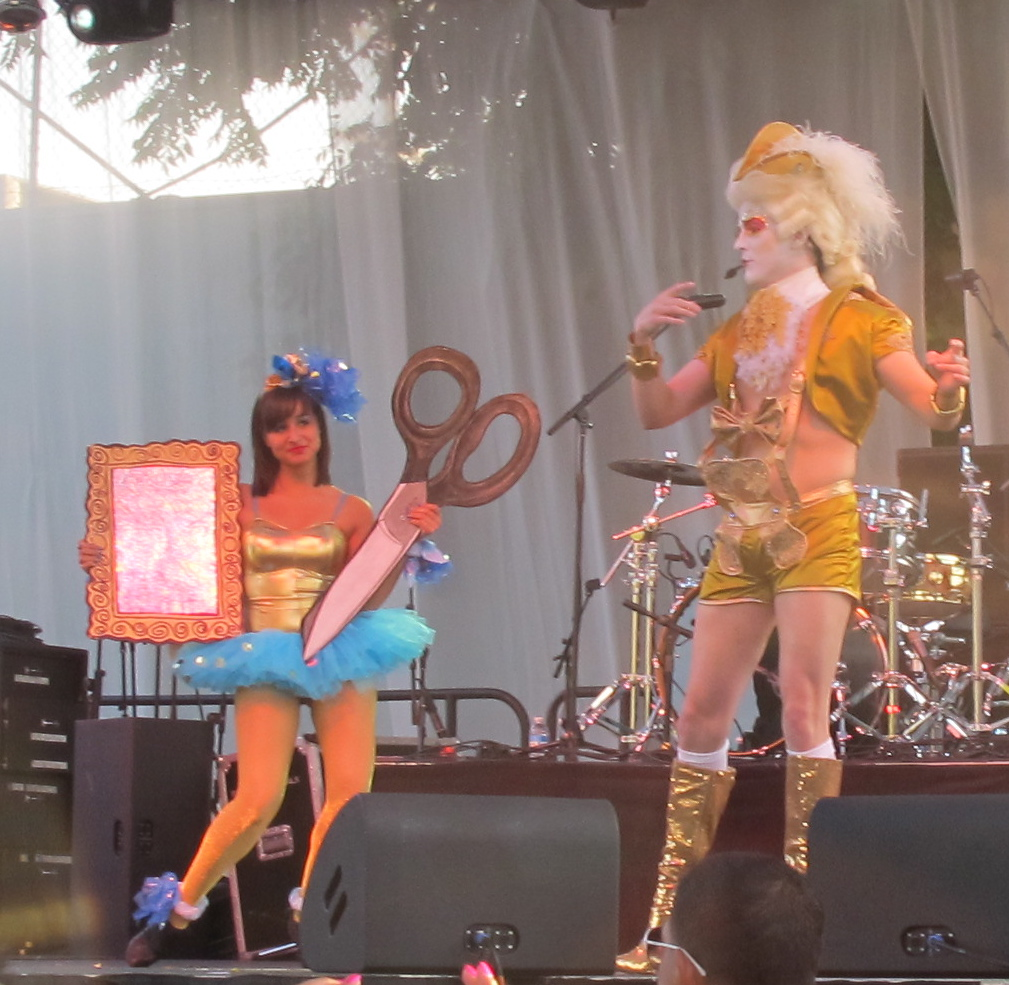
Prince Poppycock performing at Gay Pride in West Hollywood in 2011

On Halloween, October 31, 2010, Prince Poppycock was crowned the honorary Mayor of West Hollywood for the Creative City's annual Halloween Carnaval.

== America's Got Talent ==
In summer 2010, Quale auditioned and became one of the top four finalists on NBC's reality television talent show series America's Got Talent that features singers, dancers, magicians, comedians and other performers of all ages competing for the advertised top prize of US$1 million, and a show as the headliner on the Las Vegas Strip. The Tampa Tribune called him "one of the most unusual contestants in the show's history". They noted he has been called "a male Lady Gaga" and "the Adam Lambert of America's Got Talent", and that he "may be the most innovative act since Pee-wee Herman".

For the New York City auditions (June 8) he performed a modified—to fit the 90 second timeframe—and slightly personalized version of the Figaro aria ("Largo al factotum"). Sung at the first entrance of the title character, the repeated "Figaro" notes before the final patter section are an icon in popular culture of operatic singing. Due to the fast tempo and tongue-twisting lines, the piece is often noted as one of the most difficult baritone arias to perform. In the pre-interview segment he noted the difficulty of the piece, as did the judges after the performance.

For the Las Vegas Week, Classical Singers performance (July 6) Quale's voice was compromised by illness but his overall performance of an abridged version of "La donna è mobile" ("Woman is fickle"), the cynical Duke of Mantua's canzone from Giuseppe Verdi's opera Rigoletto (1851), helped him advance to the quarterfinals. The canzone is famous as a showcase for tenors. Quale could be seen struggling to hit the highest notes and was visibly upset that he could not be in better health.

For Week 4 of the quarterfinals (August 3) he performed "Vesti la giubba" ("Put on the costume"), a famous tenor aria from the opera Pagliacci by Ruggero Leoncavallo, and first performed in 1892. The aria exemplifies the entire notion of the 'tragic clown': smiling on the outside but crying on the inside. Quale was costumed by Steve LaNasa as a clown with a tear after he took off a large wrapped costuming, the costume was later lit up from inside with several hundred color-changing LEDs.

For round 1 of the semifinals (August 24) Quale performed a modified version "Bohemian Rhapsody", a song by the British rock band Queen, written by Freddie Mercury for the album A Night at the Opera (1975).

For the Top 10 show (September 7) Quale did a medley of "The Star-Spangled Banner", "The Yankee Doodle Boy", and "The Stars and Stripes Forever". In the middle he quoted from the second sentence of the United States' "Declaration of Independence", a sweeping statement of individual human rights, "We hold these truths to be self-evident, that all men are created equal ..." While he spoke, images of American civil rights icons Abraham Lincoln, Susan B. Anthony, Harvey Milk, and Rosa Parks were shown as well as an image of Poppycock on a $3 bill.

Quale stated he planned to have a more emotionally connected performance for the Final 4 show, "I feel it's a strength that I have as a performer that hasn't really been showcased as much because I've been focused so much on spectacle [for America's Got Talent]. I'll still bring spectacle, but hopefully an emotionally resonant performance as well." He performed "Nessun dorma" ("None shall sleep"), an aria from Giacomo Puccini's opera Turandot (1926). During the performance he was buzzed by judge Piers Morgan who said, "I think you've blown it. ... You were guilty, I'm afraid, of that terrible crime that many contestants do at this stage, of taking yourself a little bit too seriously. And the whole point of Prince Poppycock is that you're great fun. You're a great showman. You make me smile. And you didn't make me smile tonight!"

On the September 15, 2010, finale, Poppycock opened the show with a duet with one of his favorite celebrities, singer and disco superstar Donna Summer. That night, he finished in fourth place. A day after the finale of America's Got Talent Poppycock made an appearance on The Tonight Show with Jay Leno in a segment called "The Ross Report" (with Ross Mathews) which he mentioned and posted pictures of on his Twitter page. The top ten finalists performed in a 25-city tour of the US in October and November 2010. He returned to AGT as a guest artist in August 2011.

=== Performances ===
Episode	Song(s)	Original artist/composer
New York City auditions (June 8)	"Largo al factotum" ("Make way for the factotum"), an aria from The Barber of Seville (1816)	Gioachino Rossini
Las Vegas Week, Classical Singers (July 6)	"La donna è mobile" ("Woman is fickle"), a canzone from Rigoletto (1851)	Giuseppe Verdi
Week 4 (August 3)	"Vesti la giubba" ("Put on the costume"), an aria from Pagliacci (1892)	Ruggero Leoncavallo
Round 1 (August 24)	"Bohemian Rhapsody" (1975), by British rock band Queen	Freddie Mercury
Top 10 (September 7)	Medley of "The Star-Spangled Banner" (1814), "The Yankee Doodle Boy" (1904), and "Columbia, the Gem of the Ocean" (1843) with an excerpt of the U.S. Declaration of Independence (1776)	Francis Scott Key; George M. Cohan; Thomas á Becket; Thomas Jefferson
Top 4 (September 14)	"Nessun dorma" ("None shall sleep"), an aria from Turandot (1926); Buzzed by Piers Morgan	Giacomo Puccini
Finale (September 15)	Medley of Donna Summer's Last Dance (1978) and No More Tears (Enough Is Enough) (1979)	Paul Jabara, Jabara and Bruce Roberts
