= Alice Tan Ridley =

American singer (1952–2025)

Alice Ann Ridley-Sidibe
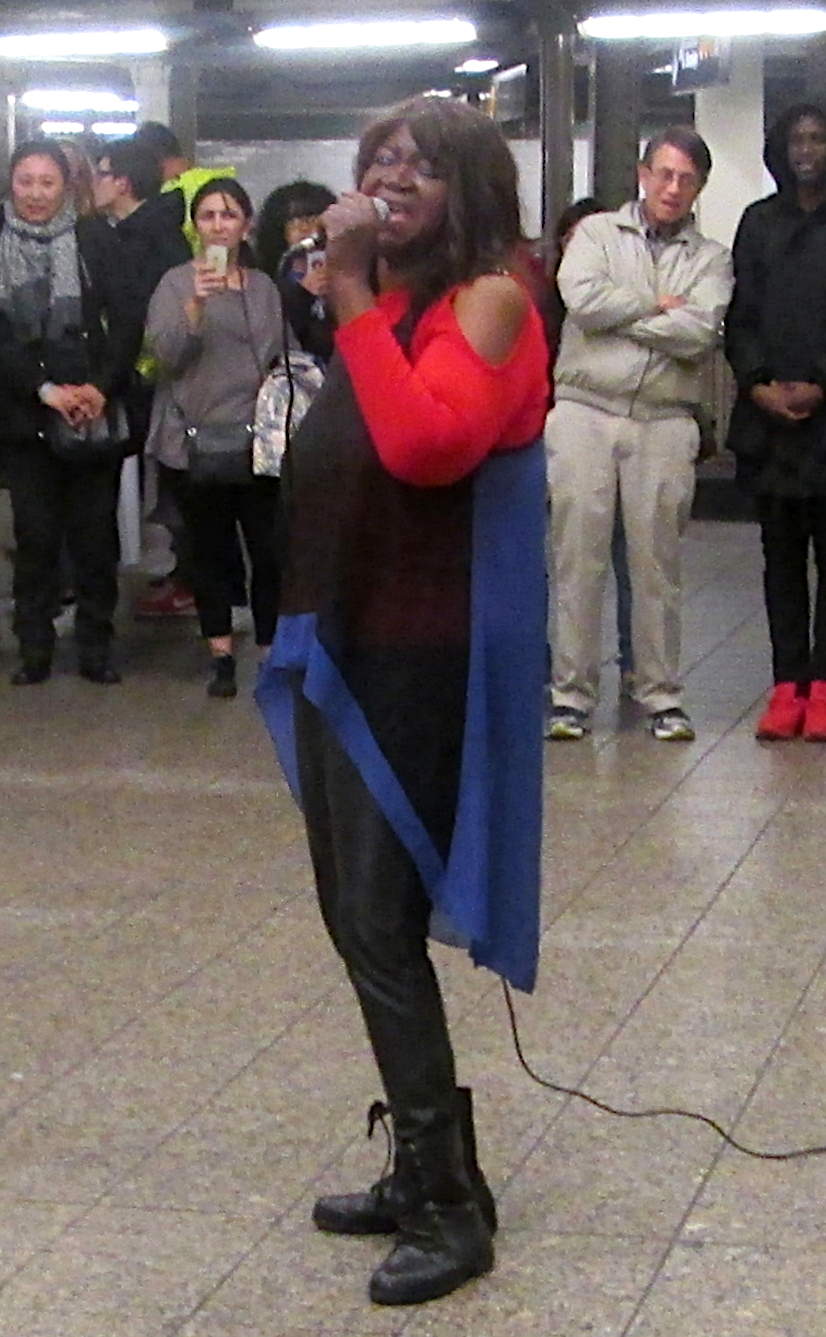
- Ridley performing in the Times Square Subway station

Background information
- Also known as: Alice Tan Ridley
- Born: December 21, 1952; Lumpkin, Georgia, U.S.
- Died: March 25, 2025 (aged 72) New York City, New York U.S.
- Genres: Gospel, R&B
- Occupation: Singer
- Years active: 1995–2025

Alice Ann "Tan" Ridley (December 21, 1952 – March 25, 2025) was an American gospel and R&B singer, the mother of actress Gabourey Sidibe, and sister of feminist and activist Dorothy Pitman Hughes. Ridley advanced to the semi-finals of the NBC television series America's Got Talent, after previously winning $25,000 in the pilot episode of 30 Seconds to Fame. Ridley released her debut album Never Lost My Way at the age of 63 in September 2016.

== Biography ==
Alice Ann Ridley, known affectionately as "Tan", was born and raised in Lumpkin, Georgia, one of nine children of Melton and Lessie Lee. Moving to New York, she married Ibnou Sidibe in 1980. She had two children with Ibnou: Ahmed and Gabourey Sidibe. The couple divorced in the early 1990s.

For about 30 years, Ridley had been singing and busking in New York City subway stations, mainly at Herald Square in Midtown Manhattan. She was a paid singer at Harlem's Cotton Club for many years, performing for "Brunch and Gospel". For six years, Ridley toured with a 7-piece band doing shows at performing arts centers across America. Her daughter Gabourey Sidibe starred in the 2009 hit film Precious and garnered critical acclaim.

On October 6, 2012, Ridley performed, for the first time in her life, with a 65-piece symphony orchestra at Ohio Northern University in Ada, Ohio.

== America's Got Talent ==
Overview

Ridley auditioned in New York for the fifth season of America's Got Talent. She auditioned with Etta James' hit song "At Last". She was praised by judges Piers Morgan, Sharon Osbourne, and Howie Mandel and advanced to Vegas Week. There, she was selected to move on to the Top 48, alongside fellow singer Debra Romer. On July 20, Ridley performed "Midnight Train to Georgia" by Gladys Knight. She received a standing ovation from the crowd and the judges, and was praised for her performance. She advanced to the semi-finals with AscenDance, Michael Grimm, and Antonio Restivo. Her semi-final performance of "I Have Nothing" was the first performance of the twelve of the night, with Piers Morgan calling it a great beginning for the show. When placed against Studio One Young Beast Society in the final moments of the results show the next night, both Piers Morgan and Sharon Osbourne opted for Studio One, and ended Ridley's time on America's Got Talent.

Performances and results

Week	Theme	Song choice	Original artist	Performance order	Result
Audition	New York	"At Last"	Etta James	N/A	Safe
Vegas Week	Female Singers	"Proud Mary"	Creedence Clearwater Revival	2	Safe
Top 48	Quarterfinals	"Midnight Train to Georgia"	Gladys Knight	2	Safe
Top 24	Semifinals	"I Have Nothing"	Whitney Houston	1	Eliminated; Judges' Choice

== Personal Life and Death ==
Ridley died in New York City on March 25, 2025, at the age of 72. She was buried at Mount Olive Primitive Baptist Church Cemetery in Louvale, Georgia, on April 12, 2025.
