= Michael Grimm (album) =

Studio album by Michael Grimm
- Released: May 17, 2011
- Genre: Blues
- Label: Epic, Sony, Syco
- Producer: Don Was

Michael Grimm chronology
Leave Your Hat On (2010)	Michael Grimm (2011)

Singles from Michael Grimm
- 1. "Fallin'" Released: March 22, 2011

Professional ratings
Review scores
Source	Rating
Allmusic	3.5/5 stars

Michael Grimm is the major-label debut album, and third overall, by America's Got Talent season five winner, Michael Grimm.

== Background ==
A week after winning Talent, Michael was signed to Epic Records. Michael collaborated with Ann Wilson on the opening track, "Gasoline and Matches," and he collaborated with Travis Tritt on the Lynyrd Skynyrd remake, "Simple Man." The album was produced by Don Was.

== Singles ==
Michael performed the song "Fallin'" by Alicia Keys on The Ellen DeGeneres Show to promote the album on March 24, 2011. He also announced the album's release date during the show.

== Reception ==
The album debuted at #13 on the US Billboard 200 chart, selling 22,000 copies.

== Track listing ==
The track list according to Amazon.com and Allmusic.

No.	Title	Writer(s)	Length
1.	"Gasoline and Matches (Feat. Ann Wilson)"	Buddy Miller, Judy Miller	3:21
2.	"Something I Said"	Michael Grimm, Kevin Hunter	4:28
3.	"Stay With Me (Baby)"	Jerry Ragovoy, George David Weiss	4:34
4.	"No Other Love"	Chuck Prophet	3:50
5.	"Simple Man"	Gary Rossington, Ronnie Van Zant	6:37
6.	"Champagne and Wine"	Otis Redding	3:09
7.	"Let's Make Love Again"	Michael Grimm	4:41
8.	"Red"	Ian Dench, Amanda Ghost, Scott McFarnon	4:41
9.	"Suddenly You Are"	Michael Grimm, Kevin Hunter	3:51
10.	"Fallin'"	Alicia Keys	4:99
11.	"I Am"	Michael Grimm, Kevin Hunter	4:30
12.	"You Don't Know Me"	Cindy Walker, Eddy Arnold	4:18
13.	"Stay With Me"	Rod Stewart, Ron Wood	4:42

Bonus tracks Syco Music - Epic Records CD edition:
No.	Title	Writer(s)	Length
14.	"A Mile Away"	Michael Grimm, Kevin Hunter, Ian Dench	3:48
15.	"Angel Eyes"		4:56
16.	"Don't Be Afraid of Love"		3:30

== Personnel ==
- Michael Grimm - guitar, acoustic guitar, lead vocals
- Waddy Wachtel - guitar, electric guitar
- Patrick Warren - keyboards
- Reggie McBride, Davey Faragher - bass
- Ian McLagan - Hammond B3, piano, Wurlitzer
- Greg Leisz - dobro, guitar, electric guitar, pedal steel, slide guitar, mandolin
- Kenny Aronoff - drums, percussion
- Daphne Chen - violin
- Lauren Chipman - viola
- Richard Dodd - cello
- Julia Waters, Julie Waters, Maxine Waters - backing vocals

== Credits ==
- Producer - Don Was
- Production coordinator - Ivy Skoff
- Engineer - Howard Willing
- Second engineers - Phil Allen, Scott Moore
- Mixing - Bob Clearmountain
- Mixing assistant - Brandon Duncan
- Vocal engineer - Thom "TK" Kidd
- Mastering - Bob Ludwig
- Photography - Dove Shore
- Art direction, design - Fusako Chubachi
