= America's Got Talent season 5 =

Season of television series

America's Got Talent
- Season 5
- Showrunner: Jason Raff
- Hosted by: Nick Cannon
- Judges: Piers Morgan; Sharon Osbourne; Howie Mandel
- Winner: Michael Grimm
- Runner-up: Jackie Evancho
- Finals venue: CBS Television City
- No. of episodes: 32

Release
- Original network: NBC
- Original release: June 1 – September 15, 2010

Season chronology
- ← Previous; Season 4 Next → Season 6

Judges and Host for America's Got Talent Season 5

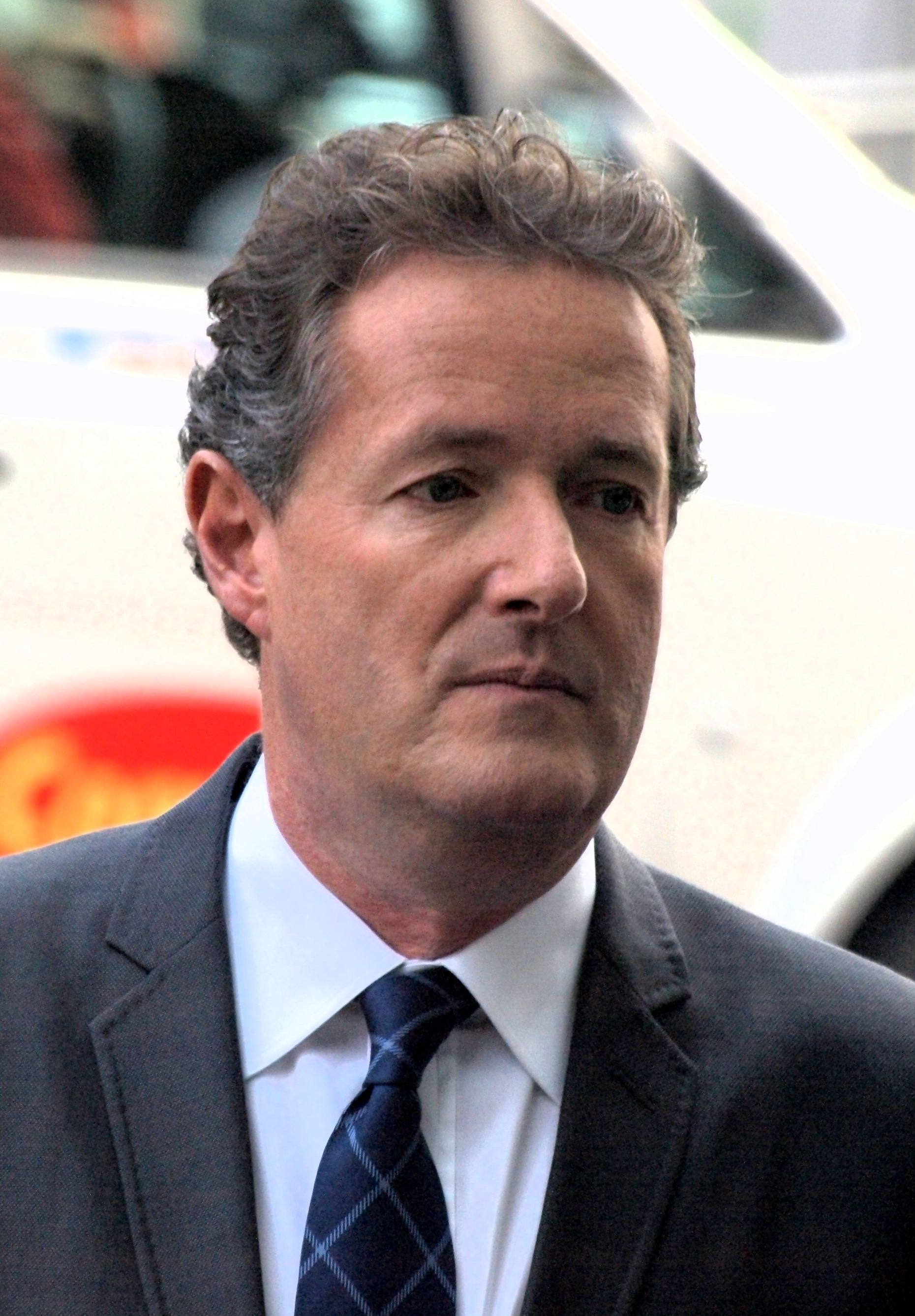
Piers Morgan

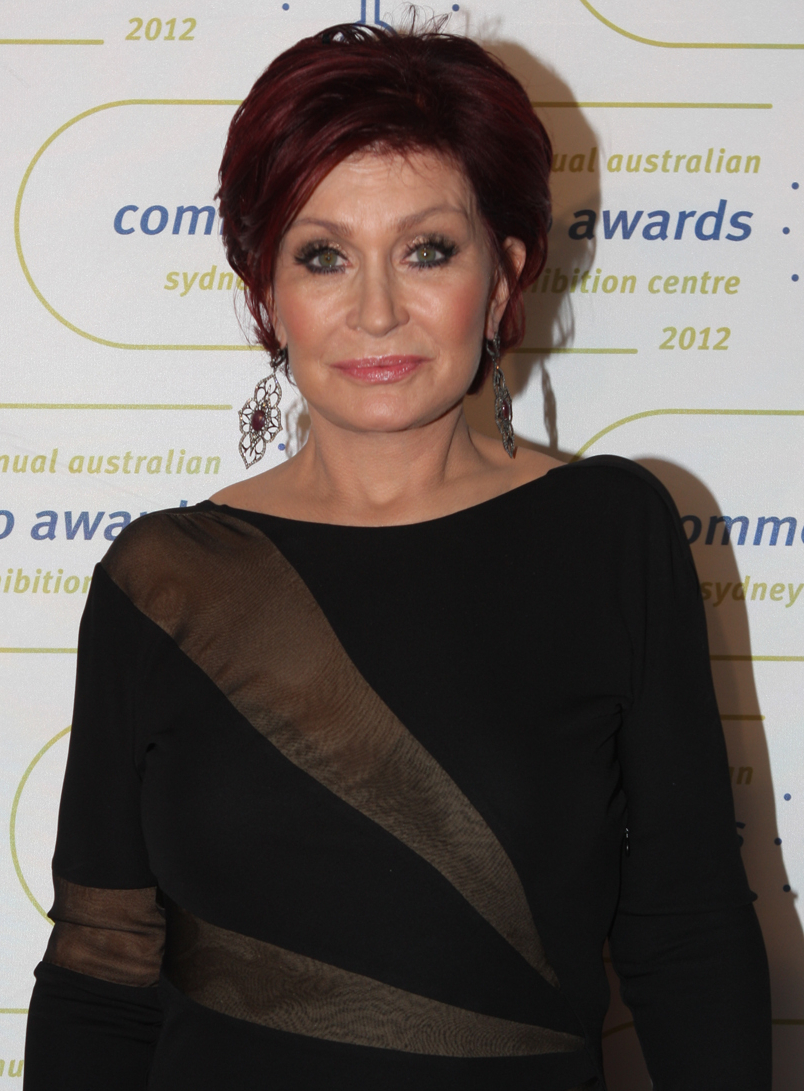
Sharon Osbourne

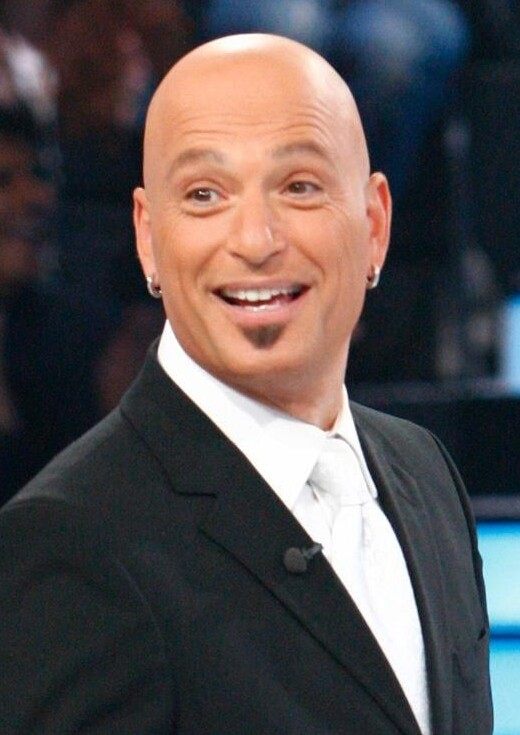
Howie Mandel

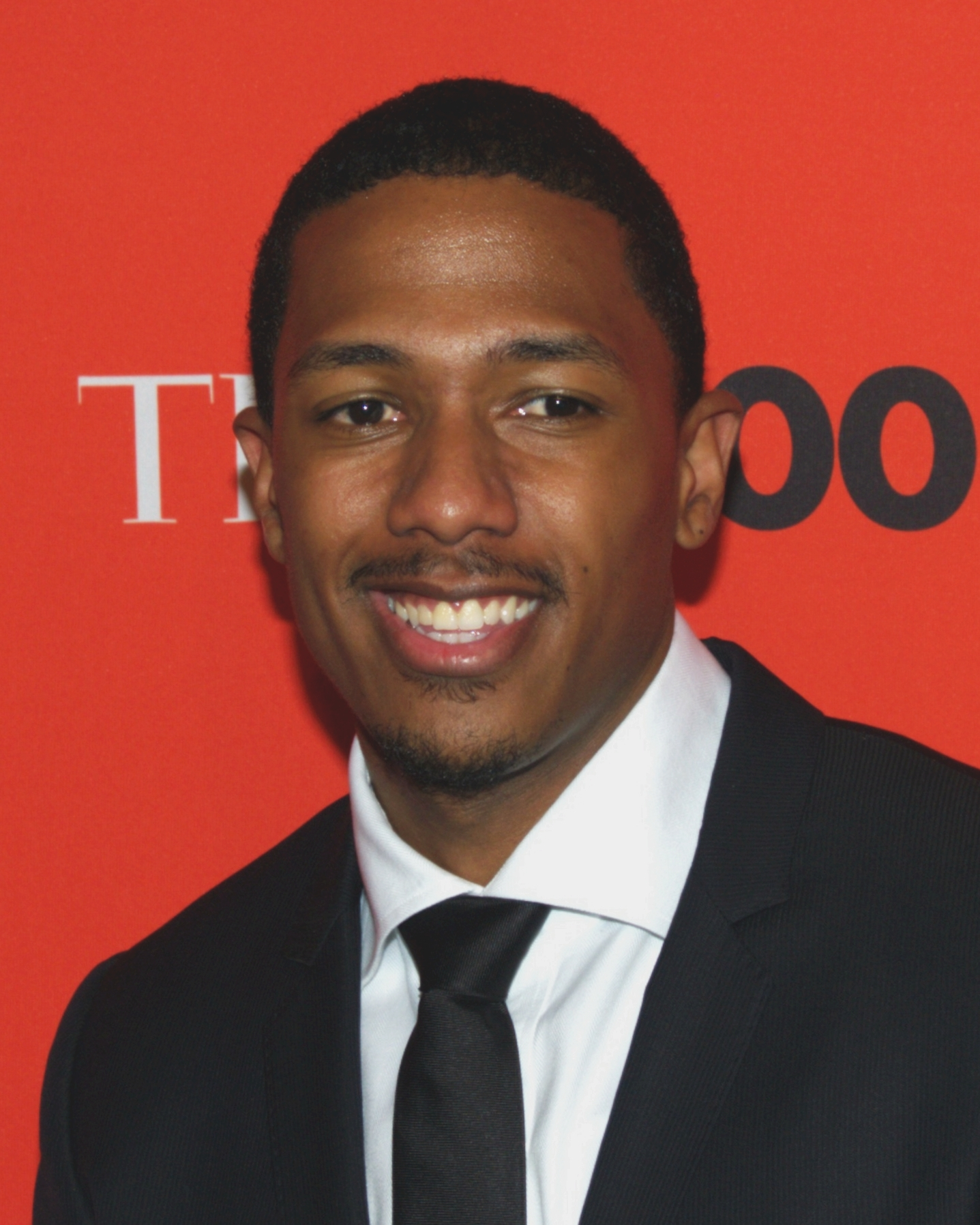
Nick Cannon

The fifth season of American talent show competition series America's Got Talent was broadcast on NBC from June 1 to September 15, 2010. For the season, production staff introduced two new quarter-finals: one for Wildcards selected from the participants eliminated during auditions or their respective quarter-final, and one for acts that auditioned via YouTube, following changes in the online application process. After the conclusion of the fourth season, David Hasselhoff left the program, and was replaced by Howie Mandel.

The fifth season was won by soul singer Michael Grimm, with classical crossover singer Jackie Evancho finishing in second, and blacklight performaners Fighting Gravity placing third. During its broadcast, the season averaged about 11.11 million viewers, with its season finale being the most watched in the program's history with approximately 16.41 million viewers.

== Season overview ==
Auditions for the fifth season's competition took place during Winter until mid-Spring 2010. Auditions were filmed in Dallas, Los Angeles, New York, Portland, Chicago and at the Universal Orlando Resort. Prior to production starting, David Hasselhoff left the show to focus on a new project, leaving a replacement needed for his role as judge. A week after Hasselhoff announced his departure from AGT, the network unveiled his successor as Howie Mandel, who had recently finished his fourth season as host of the American edition of Deal or No Deal (before its eight-year hiatus began that year).

For the season, format changes included the addition of two new rounds in the quarter-finals. The first new round was arranged for online auditions, which in itself was modified in rules and arrangements. Prior to the fifth season, most online auditions were made via MySpace and did not guarantee that any submissions made would secure a place in the competition. However, these online applications were later changed so that applicants could submit recorded auditions on a special YouTube channel. Eleven acts were picked by the judges, while a twelfth would be selected by voting from online viewers, guaranteeing a place in the competition via a special quarter-final round. The second new round was a reformatting of the Wildcard system. Unlike the original format, the judges could each pick about four participants who were eliminated from the competition, either at the Vegas Verdicts stage or in the quarter-finals. The decision to include two new quarter-finals to the competition's schedule, meant that the number of quarter-finalists allowed to move on to the semi-finals, were reduced to around four from each quarter-final. The top three were voted on by the public, and the fourth was chosen by the judges from those placed fourth and fifth respectively, in the public vote.

Another change in the format was a deeper involvement of guest performers in America's Got Talent. While the program had mainly made use of them for entertainment during the Results episode aired after the Performance episodes in the previous season, additional guest performers became involved in the program after the rules on performances in the live grand-final were changed. Participants could each conduct a performance alongside a guest performer, with the choice determined by the type of act they performed. Despite arranging a variety of guest performers for this season, the involvement of Susan Boyle during the results of the Top 10 final was cancelled at the last minute, due to a legal complication securing the rights to a song by Lou Reed.

Of the participants who auditioned for the season, sixty-five secured a place in the live quarter-finals, with twelve quarter-finalists in each one. Seven of these would later be given a second chance in the Wildcard quarter-final, after losing their initial quarter-final. About twenty-four advanced and were split between the two semi-finals, with ten semi-finalists securing a place in the finals, and four finalists securing a place in the grand-final of the competition. Below are the results of each participant's overall performance in this season:

Winner | Runner-up | Third place | Finalist | Semi-finalist
Quarter-finalist | Wildcard Quarter-finalist

Participant	Age(s) ^{1}	Genre	Act	From	Quarter-Final	Result
Airpocalypse	22-40	Music	Air Band	Seattle	1	Eliminated
Alice Tan Ridley	57	Singing	Singer	New York City	2	Semi-finalist
Anna and Patryk	12	Dance	Ballroom Duo	New Hyde Park, New York & New York City	4 ^{2}	Finalist
Antonio Restivo	39	Magic / Danger	Magician	Las Vegas	2	Semi-finalist
ArcAttack ^{3}	25-37	Music	Band	Austin, Texas	4	Semi-finalist
AscenDance	29	Acrobatics / Dance	Acrobat Duo	Berkeley, California	2	Semi-finalist
Austin Anderson	31	Comedy	Comedian	Omaha, Nebraska	5	Eliminated
Booker Forte	21	Dance	Dancer	Virginia Beach, Virginia	5	Eliminated
Cam Hodges	22	Singing	Singer	Seattle	5	Eliminated
Cheer SF	19-52	Acrobatics / Dance	Cheerleading Group	San Francisco	2	Eliminated
Chipps Cooney	61	Comedy / Magic	Comic Magician	Edgewater, New Jersey	3	Eliminated
Christina & Ali	13 & 20	Singing	Singing Duo	Idaho Falls, Idaho	1	Finalist
CJ Dippa	12	Music	Rapper	Denton, Texas	3 ^{2}	Eliminated
Connor Doran	17	Variety	Indoor Kite Flyer	Bend, Oregon	6	Semi-finalist
Da Maniacs	25-56	Dance	Dance Group	Dallas	4	Eliminated
Dan Sperry	25	Magic	Magician	Las Vegas	5	Semi-finalist
Debra Romer	21	Singing	Singer	Kalamazoo, Michigan	3	Semi-finalist
Dylan Plummer	12	Variety	Jump Roper	Cincinnati, Ohio	5	Eliminated
Eric "Doogie" Horner	30	Comedy	Comedian	Philadelphia	4 ^{2}	Eliminated
Fighting Gravity	19-22	Dance	Blacklight Dance Group	Blacksburg, Virginia	1	Third place
Future Funk	5 & 10	Dance	Dance Duo	Las Vegas	1	Semi-finalist
Hannibal Means	59	Singing	Opera Singer	Vienna, Austria	2	Eliminated
Harmonica Pierre	74	Music	Harmonica Player	Tucson, Arizona	3 ^{2}	Eliminated
Haspop	32	Dance	Dancer	Los Angeles (originally Lyon, France)	3	Semi-finalist
Iron Horse	22-27	Singing / Music	Band	Crete, Illinois	2	Eliminated
Jackie Evancho	10	Singing	Classical Singer	Pittsburgh	5	Runner-up
Jeremy VanSchoonhoven	27	Danger	Trial Bike Rider	Talent, Oregon	3	Finalist
Kaya & Sadie	32 & 36	Dance	Belly Dance Duo	Denver	3	Eliminated
Kristina Young	22	Singing	Singer	Little Rock, Arkansas	5	Semi-finalist
Kruti Dance Academy	15-33	Dance	Dance Group	Atlanta	6	Eliminated
Kung Fu Heroes	23-31	Acrobatics	Martial Arts Group	Costa Mesa, California	1	Eliminated
Lil Chris	12	Singing	Singer	Sarasota, Florida	2	Eliminated
Lindsey Stirling	23	Music	Violinist	Provo, Utah	4	Eliminated
Luigi	20	Singing	Singer	Highland, California	3	Eliminated
Maestro Alexander Bui	16	Music	Pianist	Egg Harbor Township, New Jersey	5	Semi-finalist
Maricar	38	Variety	Burlesque Painter	Los Angeles	1	Eliminated
Mary Ellen	74	Singing / Music	Singer & Pianist	Manheim, Pennsylvania	4	Eliminated
Michael Grasso	36	Magic	Magician	Cape May, New Jersey	6	Finalist
Michael Grimm	30	Singing / Music	Singer & Guitarist	Hancock County, Mississippi	2	Winner
Michael Lipari & Ashleigh Dejon	29 & 30	Acrobatics	Aerial Duo	Los Angeles	6	Semi-finalist
Mona Sampath Dance Company	9-31	Dance	Dance Group	Sunnyvale, California	2	Eliminated
MURRAY	30	Magic	Magician	Las Vegas	4	Semi-finalist
Nathaniel Kenyon	19	Singing	Singer	Baxley, Georgia	1	Semi-finalist
Nick Pike ^{4}	30	Danger	Daredevil	Myrtle Beach, South Carolina	1	Eliminated
NU Covenant	21-27	Singing	Vocal Group	Cleveland, Ohio	4	Eliminated
Paul Safy Jr.	26	Singing	Singer	New York City	1	Eliminated
Pizza Patt	27	Variety	Pizza Dough Juggler	Columbus, Ohio	5	Eliminated
PLUtonic	19-28	Singing	A Cappella Group	Tacoma, Washington	5	Eliminated
Polina Volchek	24	Acobatics	Acrobat	Las Vegas (originally Moscow, )	3	Eliminated
Prince Poppycock	32	Singing	Opera Singer	Los Angeles	4	Grand-finalist
Pup	58 ^{5}	Animals	Dog Act	Redwood City, California	5	Eliminated
RNG	11-13	Dance	Dance Group	Seattle	1 ^{2}	Eliminated
Ronith	59	Comedy	Impressionist	Seattle	2	Eliminated
Rudi Macaggi	43	Acrobatics	Acrobat	Las Vegas	4 ^{2}	Eliminated
Studio One Young Beast Society	10-21	Dance	Dance Group	Orlando	3	Finalist
Ryan Rodriguez	29	Dance	Dancer	Santa Cruz, California	5	Eliminated
Sally Cohn	75	Music	Hand Whistler	Portland, Oregon	1	Eliminated
Strikers All Stars	22-26	Dance	Dance Group	Los Angeles	4	Eliminated
Swing Swift Slide Show ^{6}	30-31	Danger	Sideshow Performers	Las Vegas	6	Eliminated
Taylor Mathews	18	Singing	Singer	Alexandria, Louisiana	4	Finalist
The Hot Shot Tap Dancers	19-25	Dance	Tap Dance Group	Portland, Oregon	1 ^{2}	Eliminated
The South Philly Vikings	16-56	Dance	Dance Group	Philadelphia	3	Eliminated
The Strange Familiar	27	Singing / Music	Band	Woodland Hills, California	3	Eliminated
The Strong Man	43	Variety	Strongman	Pesotum, Illinois	2	Eliminated
Wreckless	17-26	Dance	Dance Group	Ft. Lauderdale, Florida	2	Eliminated

- ^1 Ages denoted for a participant(s), pertain to their final performance for this season.
- ^2 These participants were entered into the Wildcard quarter-final after losing their initial quarter-final.
- ^3 For health and safety reasons, ArcAttack had to perform outside the studio for their live round performances; judges were required to view the performance in person, and used hand-carried signs in place of their buzzers.
- ^4 This participant was originally eliminated during the Vegas Verdicts, but was brought back after another act that had passed that stage was forced to drop out for unknown reasons.
- ^5 The age of the dog in this act was not disclosed on the program.
- ^6 This participant initially dropped out for personal reasons, despite securing a place in the live rounds, but agreed to return as a quarter-finalist in the Wildcard round.

=== Quarter-finals summary ===
Buzzed Out | Judges' choice | Advanced to Semi-finals
Won Judges' Vote | Lost Judges' Vote

==== Quarter-final 1 (July 13) ====
Guest Performers, Results Show: Selena Gomez & the Scene, and cast of Rock of Ages & Dee Snider

Quarter-Finalist	Order	Buzzes and Judges' votes			Result (July 14)
Quarter-Finalist	Order	Mandel	Osbourne	Morgan	Result (July 14)
Kung Fu Heroes	1				Eliminated
Christina & Ali	2				Advanced
Airpocalypse	3				Eliminated
The Hot Shot Tap Dancers	4				Eliminated
Paul Safy Jr.	5				Eliminated
Future Funk	6				Won Judges' Vote
Sally Cohn	7				Eliminated
Nick Pike	8				Eliminated
RNG	9				Lost Judges' Vote
Maricar	10				Eliminated
Fighting Gravity	11				Advanced
Nathaniel Kenyon	12				Advanced

==== Quarter-final 2 (July 20) ====
Guest Performers, Results Show: Cast of Cirque Du Soleil, and Train.

Quarter-Finalist	Order	Buzzes and Judges' votes			Result (July 21)
Quarter-Finalist	Order	Mandel	Osbourne	Morgan	Result (July 21)
Cheer SF	1				Eliminated
Alice Tan Ridley	2				Advanced
Mona Sampath Dance Company	3				Eliminated
Iron Horse	4				Eliminated
The Strong Man	5				Eliminated
Ronith	6				Eliminated
Hannibal Means	7				Eliminated
Wreckless	8				Lost Judges' Vote
Lil Chris	9				Eliminated
AscenDance	10				Advanced
Antonio Restivo	11				Won Judges' Vote
Michael Grimm	12				Advanced

==== Quarter-final 3 (July 27) ====
Guest Performers, Results Show: Mike Posner, and the JabbaWockeeZ.

Quarter-Finalist	Order	Buzzes and Judges' votes			Result (July 28)
Quarter-Finalist	Order	Mandel	Osbourne	Morgan	Result (July 28)
The South Philly Vikings	1				Eliminated
CJ Dippa	2				Eliminated
Harmonica Pierre	3				Eliminated
Polina Volchek	4				Eliminated
The Strange Familiar	5				Eliminated
Haspop	6				Advanced
Luigi	7				Eliminated
Chipps Cooney	8				Eliminated
Kaya and Sadie	9				Lost Judges' Vote
Jeremy VanSchoonhoven	10				Won Judges' Vote
Debra Romer	11				Advanced
Studio One Young Beast Society	12				Advanced

==== Quarter-final 4 (August 3) ====
Guest Performers, Results Show: Taio Cruz, and Bret Michaels.

Quarter-Finalist	Order	Buzzes and Judges' votes			Result (August 4)
Quarter-Finalist	Order	Mandel	Osbourne	Morgan	Result (August 4)
Da Maniacs	1				Eliminated
NU Covenant	2				Eliminated
Anna and Patryk	3				Lost Judges' Vote
Lindsey Stirling	4				Eliminated
Doogie Horner	5				Eliminated
Rudi Macaggi	6				Eliminated
Taylor Mathews	7				Advanced
Mary Ellen	8				Eliminated
ArcAttack	9				Won Judges' Vote
Prince Poppycock	10				Advanced
MURRAY	11				Advanced
Strikers All Stars	12				Eliminated

==== Quarter-final 5 – YouTube Round (August 10) ====
Guest Performers, Results Show: Lin Yu Chun, Evolution of Dance, and David & Dania.

Quarter-Finalist	Order	Buzzes and Judges' votes			Result (August 11)
Quarter-Finalist	Order	Mandel	Osbourne	Morgan	Result (August 11)
PLUtonic	1				Eliminated
Dylan Plummer	2				Eliminated
Pup	3				Eliminated
Cam Hodges	4				Lost Judges' Vote
Ryan Rodriguez	5				Eliminated
Austin Anderson	6				Eliminated
Booker Forté	7				Eliminated
Pizza Patt	8				Eliminated
Kristina Young	9				Won Judges' Vote
Maestro Alexander Bui	10				Advanced
Dan Sperry	11				Advanced
Jackie Evancho	12				Advanced

==== Quarter-final 6 - Wildcard Round (August 17) ====
Guest Performers, Results Show: LeAnn Rimes, and Criss Angel.

Quarter-Finalist	Order	Buzzes and Judges' votes			Result (August 18)
Quarter-Finalist	Order	Mandel	Osbourne	Morgan	Result (August 18)
Kruti Dance Academy	1				Eliminated
Rudi Macaggi	2				Eliminated
CJ Dippa	3				Eliminated
RNG	4				Eliminated
Harmonica Pierre	5	^{7}			Lost Judges' Vote
Michael Grasso	6				Advanced
The Hot Shot Tap Dancers	7				Eliminated
Doogie Horner	8				Eliminated
Connor Doran	9				Advanced
Anna and Patryk	10				Advanced
Michael Lipari & Ashleigh Dejon	11				Won Judges' Vote
Swing Shift Side Show	12				Eliminated

- ^7Mandel originally buzzed Harmonica Pierre after being introduced out of frustration due to Morgan buzzing the acts that he and Osbourne brought back. Mandel apologized for the buzz during the results show.

=== Semi-finals summary ===
Buzzed Out | Judges' choice | Advanced to Top 10
Won Judges' Vote | Lost Judges' Vote

==== Semi-final 1 (August 24) ====
Guest Performers, Results Show: Jimmy Fallon, Kylie Minogue, and Recycled Percussion.

Semi-Finalist	Order	Buzzes and Judges' votes			Result (August 25)
Semi-Finalist	Order	Mandel	Osbourne	Morgan	Result (August 25)
Anna & Patryk	1				Advanced
Christina & Ali	2				Won Judges' Vote
Antonio Restivo	3				Eliminated
Future Funk	4				Eliminated
Taylor Mathews	5				Advanced
Connor Doran	6				Lost Judges' Vote
Dan Sperry	7				Eliminated
Kristina Young	8				Eliminated
ArcAttack	9				Eliminated
Michael Grimm	10				Advanced
AscenDance	11				Eliminated
Prince Poppycock	12				Advanced

==== Semi-final 2 (August 31) ====
Guest Performers, Results Show: Cast of Le Rêve, and Jason Derülo.

Semi-Finalist	Order	Buzzes and Judges' votes			Result (September 1)
Semi-Finalist	Order	Mandel	Osbourne	Morgan	Result (September 1)
Alice Tan Ridley	1	^{8}			Lost Judges' Vote
Haspop	2				Eliminated
Maestro Alexander Bui	3				Eliminated
Michael Lipari & Ashleigh Dejon	4				Eliminated
Michael Grasso	5				Advanced
Debra Romer	6				Eliminated
Studio One Young Beast Society	7	^{8}			Won Judges' Vote
Jeremy VanSchoonhoven	8				Advanced
Nathaniel Kenyon	9				Eliminated
MURRAY	10				Eliminated
Jackie Evancho	11				Advanced
Fighting Gravity	12				Advanced

- ^8 Due to the majority vote for Studio One Young Beast Society, Mandel's voting intention was not revealed.

=== Finals summary ===
Winner (Top 4 Final Only) | Runner-up (Top 4 Final Only) | 3rd place (Top 4 Final Only)
Advanced (Top 10 Finals only) | Eliminated

==== Final - Top 10 (September 7) ====
Guest Performers: Enrique Iglesias (Performance Episode); Sarah McLachlan, and cast of American Idiot (Results Show).

Top 10 Finalist	Order	Buzzes			Result (September 8)
Top 10 Finalist	Order	Mandel	Osbourne	Morgan	Result (September 8)
Studio One Young Beast Society	1				Eliminated
Christina and Ali	2				Eliminated
Jeremy VanSchoonhoven	3				Eliminated
Taylor Mathews	4				Eliminated
Anna & Patryk	5				Eliminated
Fighting Gravity	6				Advanced
Michael Grimm	7				Advanced
Michael Grasso	8				Eliminated
Prince Poppycock	9				Advanced
Jackie Evancho	10				Advanced

==== Grand-final (September 14) ====
Guest Performers, Results Show: Usher, the Goo Goo Dolls, cast of Cirque du Soleil, David Copperfield, and T-Pain.

Finalists performed with their favorite singers: Prince Poppycock sang a duet with Donna Summer, Michael Grimm with Jewel, Jackie Evancho with Sarah Brightman and Fighting Gravity performed with Lionel Richie joining in singing.

Grand-Finalist	Order	Buzzes			Result (September 15)
Grand-Finalist	Order	Mandel	Osbourne	Morgan	Result (September 15)
Prince Poppycock	1			^{9}	4th
Michael Grimm	2				1st
Jackie Evancho	3				2nd
Fighting Gravity	4				3rd

- ^9During the results show, Morgan apologized for buzzing Prince Poppycock, stating that he made a mistake. Although Morgan jokingly said he should have buzzed Prince Poppycock 10 seconds earlier than he did, he went on to praise Prince Poppycock.

== Ratings ==
The following ratings are based upon those published by Nielsen Media Research after this season's broadcast:

Order	Episode(s)	Airdate	Rating	Share	Rating/Share (18-49)	Viewers (millions)	Rank (Timeslot)	Rank (Night)	Rank (Week)
1	"Los Angeles Auditions"	June 1, 2010	7.4	13	3.6/11	12.35	#1	#1	#4
2	"Dallas Auditions"	June 2, 2010	6.1	10	2.9/9	10.35	#1	#1	#9
3	"New York City Auditions"	June 8, 2010	7.4	12	3.7/10	13.09	#2	#2	#4
4	"New York Auditions (Part 2)"	June 15, 2010	6.2	10	3.0/8	10.55	#2	#2	#4
5	"Orlando Auditions"	June 16, 2010	6.7	11	3.1/9	11.65	#1	#1	#3
6; 7	"Orlando Auditions (Part 2)" "Portland Auditions"	June 22, 2010	6.8	12	3.4/10	11.65	#1	#1	#2
8	"Portland Auditions (Part 2)"	June 23, 2010	7.2	12	3.5/10	12.37	#1	#1	#1
9	"Chicago Auditions"	June 29, 2010	6.0	10	2.9/9	10.23	#1	#1	#2
10	"Final Auditions"	June 30, 2010	7.5	13	3.5/11	12.94	#1	#1	#1
11	"Vegas Week (Part 1)"	July 6, 2010	7.0	12	3.4/10	11.82	#1	#1	#2
12	"Vegas Week (Part 2)"	July 7, 2010	6.7	12	3.4/10	11.95	#1	#1	#1
13	"Quarterfinals, Group 1"	July 13, 2010	6.8	11	3.3/10	11.63	#1	#2	#2
14	"Quarterfinals, Group 1 Results"	July 14, 2010	6.5	11	3.0/10	11.17	#1	#2	#3
15	"Quarterfinals, Group 2"	July 20, 2010	6.2	11	3.0/9	10.48	#1	#1	#1
16	"Quarterfinals, Group 2 Results"	July 21, 2010	5.9	10	2.6/8	10.02	#1	#1	#3
17	"Quarterfinals, Group 3"	July 27, 2010	5.6	10	2.6/8	9.69	#1	#1	#1
18	"Quarterfinals, Group 3 Results"	July 28, 2010	5.7	10	2.6/8	9.76	#1	#1	#2
19	"Quarterfinals, Group 4"	August 3, 2010	6.0	10	2.9/8	10.37	#1	#1	#4
20	"Quarterfinals, Group 4 Results"	August 4, 2010	5.9	10	2.8/8	10.06	#1	#1	#5
21	"Quarterfinals, Group 5: YouTube"	August 10, 2010	6.2	11	2.9/9	10.48	#1	#1	#2
22	"Quarterfinals, Group 5: YouTube, Results"	August 11, 2010	6.2	11	2.8/8	10.67	#1	#1	#1
23	"Quarterfinals, Group 6: Wild Card"	August 17, 2010	6.1	10	2.9/8	10.19	#1	#1	#3
24	"Quarterfinals, Group 6: Wild Card, Results"	August 18, 2010	6.0	10	2.6/8	10.30	#1	#1	#2
25	"Semifinals, Group 1"	August 24, 2010	6.5	11	3.1/9	10.80	#1	#1	#2
26	"Semifinals, Group 1 Results"	August 25, 2010	6.1	10	2.7/8	10.52	#1	#1	#3
27	"Semifinals, Group 2"	August 31, 2010	6.7	11	3.0/9	11.50	#1	#1	#1
28	"Semifinals, Group 2 Results"	September 1, 2010	6.2	10	2.5/8	10.47	#1	#1	#2
29	"Top Ten, Performances"	September 7, 2010	7.3	12	3.3/9	12.35	#1	#1	#8
30	"Top Ten, Results"	September 8, 2010	7.3	12	2.8/8	12.14	#1	#1	#9
31	"Finals, Performances"	September 14, 2010	8.7	14	3.9/11	14.60	#1	#1	#4
32	"Finale"	September 15, 2010	9.5	16	3.9/11	16.41	#1	#1	#3
