= You Don't Know Me (Cindy Walker song) =

1956 song by Eddy Arnold & Cindy Walker

Single by Eddy Arnold
- B-side: "The Rockin' Mockin' Bird"
- Released: April 21, 1956
- Recorded: 1955
- Genre: Country
- Length: 2:34
- Label: RCA Victor
- Songwriters: Eddy Arnold; Cindy Walker

"You Don't Know Me" is a song written by Eddy Arnold and Cindy Walker in 1955. It was first recorded by Arnold that year and released as a single on April 21, 1956, on RCA Victor.

The best-selling version of "You Don't Know Me" was recorded by Ray Charles, who took it to number 2 on the Billboard Hot 100 chart in 1962, after releasing the song on his number 1 album Modern Sounds in Country and Western Music. The first version to make the Billboard charts was recorded by Jerry Vale in 1956, peaking at number 14 on the pop chart. Arnold's version charted two months later. It was released as an RCA Victor single, 47–6502, backed with "The Rockin' Mockin' Bird" which reached number 10 on the Billboard country chart. Cash Box magazine, which combined all best-selling versions at one position, included a version by Carmen McRae that never appeared in the Billboard Top 100 Sides listing.

In June 2026, CBS News included the Ray Charles rendition in its list of the 250 essential American songs of the past 250 years.

== Origin ==
In his book Eddy Arnold: Pioneer of the Nashville Sound, author Michael Streissguth describes how Arnold and Walker composed the song:

Cindy Walker, who had supplied Eddy with "Take Me in Your Arms and Hold Me" (a number-one country record in 1949 and Eddy's first Cindy Walker release), recalled discussing the idea for "You Don't Know Me" with Eddy as she was leaving one of Nashville's annual disc-jockey conventions. "I went up to the Victor suite to tell Steve Sholes good-bye," she explained, "and just as I was leaving, Eddy came in the door."

Arnold approached Walker, saying: "I got a song title for you... 'You Don't Know Me.'" Walker, in jest, replied "But I know you !" Arnold retorted that he was serious and proceeded to outline the story he had in mind. Walker promised to take Arnold's story and think about how to turn it into workable lyrics and melody, which eventually came naturally. "The song just started singing. It sort of wrote itself..."

"You Don't Know Me", in a basic thirty-two-bar form, is the narrative of a man who has "never (known) the art of making love" and his friendly encounter with someone he knows but secretly loves. Fearing rejection, the narrator never expresses his feelings toward the object of his affections and lets her walk away with another "lucky guy" (this lyric is gender-neutralized when sung by a woman), never knowing if she loves him back.

== Notable recorded versions ==
"You Don't Know Me"

Single by Jerry Vale
- B-side: "Enchanted"
- Released: 1956
- Recorded: 1955
- Genre: Traditional pop
- Length: 2:33
- Label: Columbia
- Songwriters: Eddy Arnold; Cindy Walker
- Producer: Percy Faith

Jerry Vale singles chronology
"Innamorata (Sweetheart)" (1956)	"You Don't Know Me" (1956)	"Mother Mine" (1956)

"You Don't Know Me"

Single by Ray Charles

from the album Modern Sounds in Country and Western Music
- B-side: "Careless Love"
- Released: July 1962
- Recorded: February 1962
- Studio: United Recording Studios, Hollywood, California
- Genre: Country; rhythm and blues; pop; soul
- Length: 3:14
- Label: ABC-Paramount 10345
- Songwriters: Eddy Arnold; Cindy Walker
- Producer: Sid Feller

Ray Charles singles chronology
"I Can't Stop Loving You" (1962)	"You Don't Know Me" (1962)	"You Are My Sunshine" (1962)

The best-selling version of the song is by Ray Charles, who took it to number 2 on the Billboard Hot 100 chart in September 1962, after releasing the song on his number 1 album Modern Sounds in Country and Western Music. It was the follow-up single to "I Can't Stop Loving You", which held the number 1 position for five weeks. After being released in July, it was kept from the number 1 spot by "Sheila" by Tommy Roe. This version also topped the Easy Listening chart for three weeks in 1962 and was used in the 1993 comedy film Groundhog Day. The song was the 12th number one country hit for Mickey Gilley in 1981.

The song has been performed or recorded by hundreds of artists, including Elvis Presley, Bob Dylan, and Willie Nelson. Charles re-recorded the song with Diana Krall on his number 1 album of duets, Genius Loves Company, the only song common to both of Charles' two number 1 albums. It was sung by Meryl Streep in the 1990 film Postcards from the Edge, by John Legend in the 2007 Curb Your Enthusiasm episode "The Bat Mitzvah", by Robert Downey Jr. in the 1998 film Two Girls and a Guy, and by Lizzy Caplan.

Artists that released versions of the song:

- Eddy Arnold (1955)
- Jerry Vale (1956)
- Jeanne Black (1960)
- Lenny Welch (1960)
- Patti Page (1962) on album Go On Home
- The Anita Kerr Singers (1962) on album From Nashville The Hit Sound
- Ray Charles (1962) on album Modern Sounds in Country and Western Music
- Dodo Greene (1962) on album My Hour of Need
- Floyd Cramer (1964) on album Country Piano-City Strings
- Manfred Mann (1965) on album Mann Made
- Rick Nelson (1965) on album Best Always
- Vic Damone (1965) on album Country Love Songs
- Jackie Wilson (1965) on album Spotlight on Jackie Wilson!
- Jan Howard (1967) on album This Is Jan Howard Country
- Elvis Presley (1967) on album Clambake
- Nancy Wilson (1967) on album Welcome To My Love
- Ray Pennington (1970) on album Sings for the Other Woman
- Roy Orbison (1973) on album Milestones
- Steve Marriott (1976) on album Marriott
- Bette Midler (1977) on album Broken Blossom
- Kenny Loggins (1977) on album Celebrate Me Home
- Mickey Gilley (1981) on album You Don't Know Me
- Juice Newton (1984) on album Can't Wait All Night
- Richard Manuel (1985) on album Whispering Pines: Live at the Getaway
- Bob James and David Sanborn (1986) on album Double Vision
- The Heptones (1986) on album Changing Times
- Don McLean (1989) on album For the Memories Vols I & II
- Marc Hunter (1989) on album Night and Day
- Israel Kamakawiwo'ole (1990) on album Ka 'Ano'i
- Charlie Rich (1992) on album Pictures and Paintings
- Emmylou Harris (1993) on album Cowgirl's Prayer
- Allen Toussaint (1994) on album Bluesiana Hot Sauce
- Diane Schuur and B.B. King (1994) on album Heart to Heart
- World Saxophone Quartet with Fontella Bass (1994) on album Breath of Life
- Van Morrison (1995) on album Days Like This (duet with his daughter Shana Morrison)
- David Sanborn (1995) on album Love Songs
- Jann Arden (1997) for the soundtrack of My Best Friend's Wedding
- Steven Houghton (1997) on album Steven Houghton
- Roseanna Vitro (1997) on album Catchin' Some Rays: The Music of Ray Charles
- Kenny Rogers (1999) on album After Dark
- Patricia Barber (2000) on album Nightclub
- Jennifer Warnes (2001) with Doyle Bramhall on album The Well
- Anne Murray (2002) on album Country Croonin'
- Michael Bolton (2003) on album Vintage
- Janis Siegel (2003) on album Friday Night Special
- Ray Charles and Diana Krall (2004) on album Genius Loves Company
- Harry Connick Jr (2004) on album Only You
- Peter Cincotti (2004) on album On the Moon
- Sarah Geronimo (2004) on album Sweet Sixteen
- Michael Bublé (2005) on album It's Time
- John Scofield (2005) with Aaron Neville on album That's What I Say: John Scofield Plays the Music of Ray Charles
- Willie Nelson (2006) on album You Don't Know Me: The Songs of Cindy Walker
- Russell Watson (2007) on album That's Life
- Leon Jackson (2008) on album Right Now
- Michael McDonald (2008) on album Soul Speak
- John Farnham (2010) on album Jack
- Gina Jeffreys (2010) on album, Old Paint
- Michael Grimm (2011) on album Michael Grimm
- Anna Wilson and Matt Giraud (2011) on album Countrypolitan Duets
- Lulu Roman (2013) on album At Last
- Michael Geier (2013)
- Ronnie Dunn (2014) on album Peace, Love, and Country Music
- Alison Krauss (2017) on album Windy City
- Crystal Gayle (2019) on album You Don't Know Me
- Ray Stevens (2021) on album Nouveau Retro
- Brigid Mae Power (2025) on album Songs For You
- John C Riley as Mister Romantic (2025) on album What’s Not to Love?

== Charts ==
=== Eddy Arnold ===
Chart (1956)	Peak position
US Hot Country Songs (Billboard)	10

=== Jerry Vale ===
Chart (1956)	Peak position
US Billboard Hot 100	14

=== Lenny Welch ===
Chart (1960)	Peak position
US Billboard Hot 100	45
US Hot R&B/Hip-Hop Songs (Billboard)	28
Canada CHUM Chart	37

=== Ray Charles ===
Chart (1962)	Peak position
US Billboard Hot 100	2
US Hot R&B/Hip-Hop Songs (Billboard)	5
US Adult Contemporary (Billboard)	1
UK Singles (Official Charts)	9
Canada CHUM Chart	18

=== Elvis Presley ===
Chart (1968)	Peak position
US Billboard Hot 100	44
US Adult Contemporary (Billboard)	34

=== Ray Pennington ===
Chart (1970)	Peak position
US Hot Country Songs (Billboard)	61

=== Mickey Gilley ===
Chart (1981)	Peak position
US Hot Country Songs (Billboard)	1
US Billboard Hot 100	55
US Adult Contemporary (Billboard)	12
Canada Country Singles (RPM)	1
Canada Adult Contemporary (RPM)	6
