= Columbia, the Gem of the Ocean =

American patriotic song

- March by Thomas A'Becket, Sr.
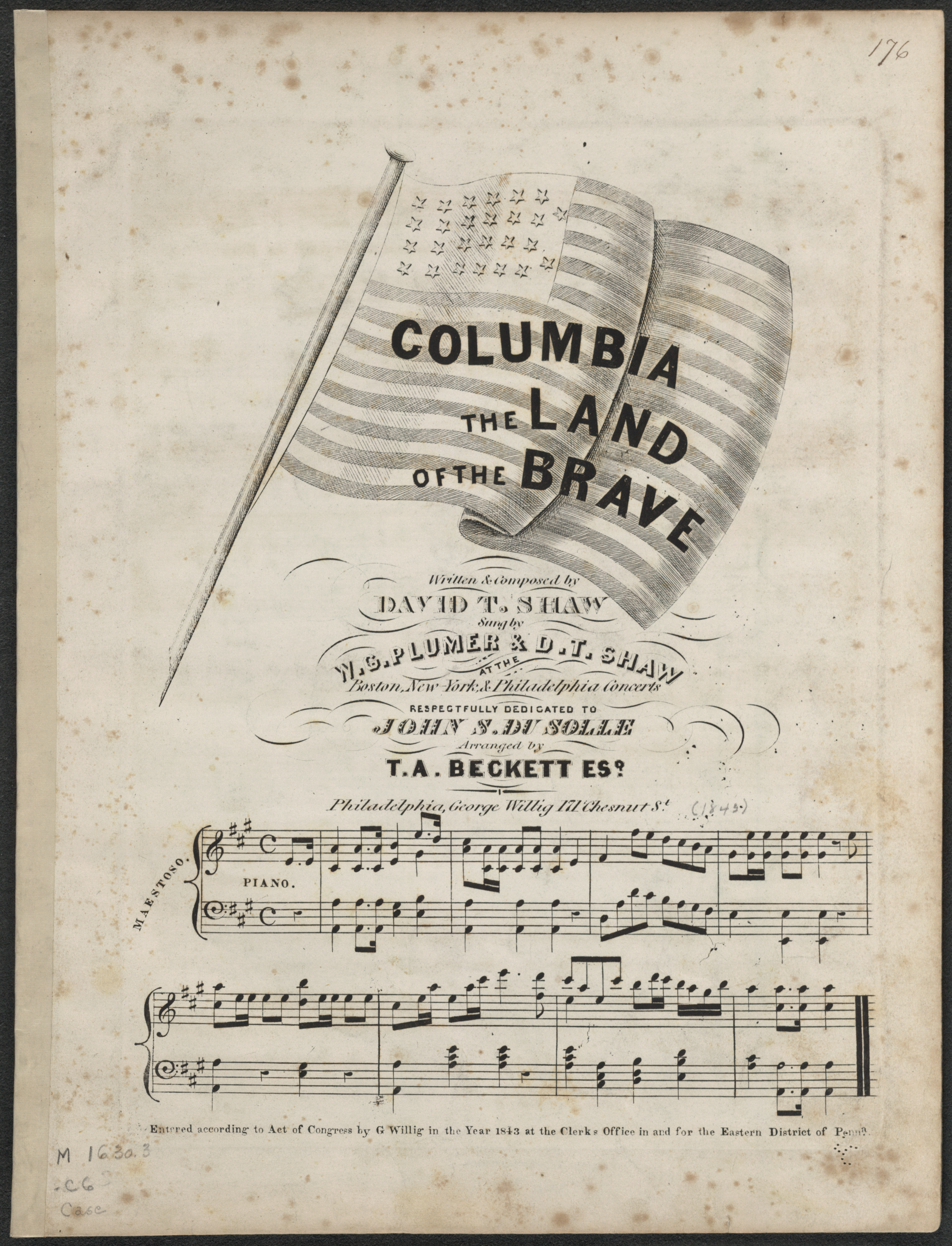
- 1843 sheet music under its original title of "Columbia, the Land of the Brave"
- Composed: c. 1843

Audio sample
- Performed by the United States Navy Band: file; help

"Columbia, the Gem of the Ocean" (originally "Columbia, the Land of the Brave") is an American patriotic song which was popular in the U.S. during the 19th and early 20th centuries. Composed c. 1843, it was long used as an unofficial national anthem of the United States, in competition with other songs. Under the title "Three Cheers for the Red, White, and Blue," the song is mentioned in Chapter IX of MacKinlay Kantor's Pulitzer Prize-winning novel Andersonville (1955). It was also featured in the 1957 musical The Music Man. In 1969, "Columbia, the Gem of the Ocean" was the music performed by a U.S. Navy Band embarked aboard USS Hornet as one of the ship's helicopters recovered the Apollo 11 astronauts from their capsule named Columbia after a splashdown in the Pacific Ocean.

The melody of "Columbia, the Gem of the Ocean" is identical to that of the British patriotic song "Britannia, the Pride of the Ocean" and there is disagreement as to which song was adapted from the other.

== History ==
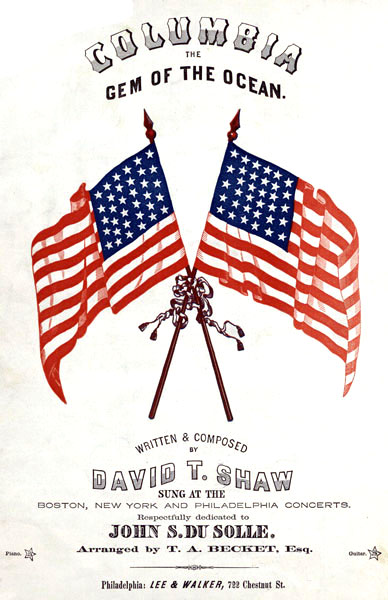
Cover of sheet music for a circa 1862 publication of "Columbia, the Gem of the Ocean".

The origins and authorship of "Columbia, the Gem of the Ocean" have been the source of some uncertainty. It is believed that Thomas A'Becket, Sr., a British musician and longtime resident of Philadelphia who performed at that city's Chestnut Street Theater, wrote the lyrics – and possibly the melody – at the request of David Shaw for the latter's performance at a benefit concert, probably in the autumn of 1843. That year, the copyright for the song was registered by the Philadelphia publishing house of George Willig under the name "Columbia, the Land of the Brave". Shaw subsequently published the song under his own name, though A'Becket later claimed sole authorship and presented an original handwritten composition as proof.

The song invokes the historic informal name "Columbia" for the United States and borrows and modifies the phrase "land of the free and the home of the brave" from Francis Scott Key's earlier "Star-Spangled Banner" as "the home of the brave and the free".

"Columbia, the Gem of the Ocean" with vocals, performed by the Robert Shaw Chorale (sample)

=== "Britannia, the Pride of the Ocean" ===
There has been some controversy as to whether "Columbia, the Gem of the Ocean" is an appropriation of a similar, British patriotic song, "Britannia, the Pride of the Ocean", or whether the latter song is, in fact, an appropriation of "Columbia, the Gem of the Ocean". Both songs have occasionally been referred to by the alternate name "The Red, White and Blue".

In a 1919 analysis of the song's lyrics, Arthur Johnston stated that "Britannia, the Pride of the Ocean" had come first, "Columbia, the Gem of the Ocean" being adapted from it. Johnston claimed that "the phrase, 'the service united' referred to the United Service Club, for which the song was written, the members of which belong both to the army and the navy". Johnston also opines that to refer to the United States as "the gem of the ocean" would be "an absurdity" and the phrase more likely was an original reference to Great Britain.

W. H. Grattan Flood also arrived at Johnston's conclusion of the British provenance of the song. He stated that Irish journalist Stephen Joseph Meany penned the lyrics to Britannia, the Pride of the Ocean in 1842 which he then showed to a friend in London, Thomas E. Williams, who composed the accompanying melody. In 1915 Flood recalled speaking to an elderly relative of his who claimed to have heard the song performed in Dublin in 1842 as a 12-year-old boy.

However, the earliest printed version of either song was the 1843 copyright version registered by American George Willig. The first printed version of the song in the United Kingdom ("Brittania, the Pride of the Ocean") did not appear until 1852, in a filing with the British Museum by T.E. Purday. Further, that version credits the song to David Shaw. Additionally, Meany – the Irishman whom Flood credits with the lyrics to "Britannia, the Pride of the Ocean" – was a Fenian who would eventually be imprisoned by the British government.

Citing the dates of printing, William Studwell concludes that "the song was probably created in the United States".

== Cultural use ==
"Columbia, the Gem of the Ocean" used as an interval signal during a 1962 Voice of America broadcast from Tangier, Morocco

According to William Studwell, "Columbia, the Gem of the Ocean" is the "oldest well-known song of entirely American origin which could, by style or content, qualify as a national anthem". In the mid-1800s, "Columbia the Gem of the Ocean" vied with other songs in the American "Patriotic Big Five" (also including "Hail, Columbia", the "Star-Spangled Banner", "Yankee Doodle", and "My Country Tis of Thee") for use as a national anthem, the United States at the time having no song officially designated as such.

"Columbia, the Gem of the Ocean" reached a height of popularity during the presidency of Abraham Lincoln and subsequently became a staple in the repertoire of the United States Marine Band. The tune was later used repeatedly by the composer Charles Ives, featuring notably in his Second Symphony (1897–1902) and Holiday Symphony (1897–1913) as well as in his Piano Sonata No. 2 (1911–15). In the 1957 musical The Music Man – set in 1912 – a full-cast rendition of "Columbia, the Gem of the Ocean" is performed during the scene depicting the town's Independence Day celebration and, from the post-World War II era through to the 1960s, the first few chords of "Columbia, the Gem of the Ocean" were used as an interval signal during Voice of America broadcasts, until ultimately replaced by "Yankee Doodle". During the recovery of the Apollo 11 astronauts after splashdown of the flight's command capsule (named Columbia) in the Pacific Ocean, President of the United States Richard Nixon – then embarked aboard the aircraft carrier USS Hornet – ordered the Band of the COMNAVAIRPAC (Commander, Naval Air Forces Pacific) to perform "Columbia, the Gem of the Ocean".

In the 1957 Charles Mingus album The Clown, the title track contains a narrative story spoken by Jean Shepherd about a clown - who suffers a fall from grace - having "a seal follow him up and down a step ladder blowing Columbia, the Gem of the Ocean on a B-flat Sears-Roebuck model 1322a plastic bugle. A real cute act. But they didn't laugh."

The song was used in the Popeye cartoons from the 1930s to the 1960s, usually after Popeye eats his spinach and gains increased power.

== Lyrics ==
O Columbia! the gem of the ocean,
The home of the brave and the free,
The shrine of each patriot's devotion,
A world offers homage to thee;
Thy mandates make heroes assemble,
When Liberty's form stands in view;
Thy banners make tyranny tremble,
When borne by the red, white, and blue.
𝄆 When borne by the red, white, and blue. 𝄇
Thy banners make tyranny tremble,
When borne by the red, white and blue.

When war wing'd its wide desolation,
And threaten'd the land to deform,
The ark then of freedom's foundation,
Columbia rode safe thro' the storm;
With her garlands of vict'ry around her,
When so proudly she bore her brave crew;
With her flag proudly waving before her,
When borne by the red, white, and blue.
𝄆 When borne by the red, white, and blue. 𝄇
With her flag proudly floating before her,
The boast of the red, white and blue.

The Union, the Union forever,
Our glorious nation's sweet hymn,
May the wreaths it has won never wither,
Nor the stars of its glory grow dim,
May the service united ne'er sever,
But they to their colors prove true.
The Army and Navy forever,
When borne by the red, white, and blue.
𝄆 When borne by the red, white, and blue. 𝄇
The Army and Navy for ever,
Three cheers for the red, white and blue.

The star spangled banner bring hither,
O'er Columbia's true sons let it wave;
May the wreaths they have won never wither,
Nor its stars cease to shine on the brave.
May thy service united ne'er sever,
But hold to the colors so true;
The Army and Navy forever,
Three cheers for the red, white, and blue!
𝄆 Three cheers for the red, white, and blue! 𝄇
The Army and Navy forever,
Three cheers for the red, white, and blue
