= Thomas A'Becket (composer) =

Actor and musician (1808–1890)

Thomas a'Becket (March 17, 1808 – January 6, 1890) was a male actor and musician credited with writing the music and the words, in 1843, to "Columbia, the Gem of the Ocean". Born in Chatham, Kent, England, a'Becket travelled to the United States in 1837 and spent much of his life in Philadelphia. At one time, he served as the stage manager of the actor Edwin Forrest and for many years was the director of the Walnut Street Theatre, in Philadelphia, where he also had a long acting career. During his early years in the United States, he gave music lessons and sang in operas.

He died in Philadelphia from heart failure and was buried in the Fernwood Cemetery, west of the city. His diaries are on deposit at the New York Public Library.
