= Michael Grimm (musician) =

American singer-songwriter (born 1978)

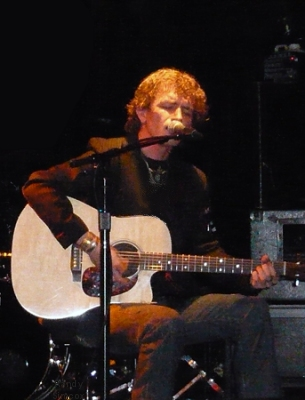
- Michael Grimm performing in Los Angeles

Background information
- Born: December 30, 1978 (age 47); Fort Carson, Colorado
- Origin: Waveland, Mississippi, U.S.
- Genres: Blues, soul
- Occupations: Singer, songwriter
- Instruments: Guitar, vocals
- Years active: 1996–present
- Labels: Mattikay Music LLC (2007-2010); Epic (2010-present)
- Website: michaelgrimmmusic.com

Michael Joseph Grimm (born December 30, 1978) is an American singer-songwriter and winner of the fifth season of America's Got Talent.

== Personal life ==
Grimm was born in Colorado on the Fort Carson base, moved to Slidell, Louisiana, but later raised in Waveland, Mississippi by his grandparents.

During the AGT finals, he revealed that his girlfriend of nearly three years, Lucie Zolcerova, was the inspiration for his performance of "When a Man Loves a Woman". "She's been there for me," Grimm told DeGeneres during a taping of The Ellen DeGeneres Show which was aired on September 17, 2010. "Once you find that good woman you hang on to her." While interviewing him, DeGeneres called Lucie down from the audience, and Grimm got on one knee to propose. Her answer was a swift "Yes".

Grimm, a Mississippi Southern Soul singer who won the $1 million AGT first prize in its 5th season, used some of his winnings to build his grandparents a new house.

As of 2016, he resides in Henderson, Nevada.

In 2023, Grimm was hospitalized due to a mysterious illness, but he recovered and returned to performing.

== America's Got Talent ==
Grimm auditioned in Los Angeles for the fifth season of America's Got Talent aired on June 1, 2010. His audition received praise from all three judges, advancing him to Vegas Week. During Vegas week, his performance of "Try a Little Tenderness" was criticized by Piers Morgan for being way over 90 seconds and could have gotten him disqualified. He still advanced to the quarterfinals. His quarterfinal performance, "Tired of Being Alone," was once again praised, and he advanced to the semifinals. Earlier in the show, Sharon Osbourne commented that her husband Ozzy Osbourne was rooting for Grimm. Grimm performed "You Can Leave Your Hat On" during semifinals while recovering from a dehydration related illness. Despite the illness, he managed to deliver a performance that was once again praised by the judges, and he advanced to the finals. After performing "Let's Stay Together" in the Top 10 without his guitar, he advanced to the Top 4. In the finale on September 14, 2010, he performed "When a Man Loves a Woman" pointing to his girlfriend, Lucie, in the audience. The following day, it was revealed that Grimm won the show, beating child singer Jackie Evancho. Grimm went to America's Got Talent: The Champions in 2020 eliminated at Preliminary.

=== Performances and results ===
Week	Theme	Song choice	Original artist	Performance order	Result
Audition	Los Angeles	"You Don't Know Me"	Eddy Arnold	N/A	Safe
Vegas Week	Male Singers	"Try a Little Tenderness"	Ray Noble Orchestra (with vocals by Val Rosing)	5	Safe
Top 48	Quarterfinals	"Tired of Being Alone"	Al Green	12	Safe
Top 24	Semifinals	"You Can Leave Your Hat On"	Randy Newman	10	Safe
Top 10	Top Ten Finals	"Let's Stay Together"	Al Green	7	Safe
Top 4	Finale	"When a Man Loves a Woman"	Percy Sledge	2	WINNER

=== Post-AGT ===
Grimm's winnings included one million dollars (before taxes and reduction for lump sum payment) and the opportunity to headline the AGT Tour Show, including one show at Caesar's Palace in Las Vegas on October 8, 2010. In September 2010, Grimm appeared on The Ellen DeGeneres Show and proposed to his girlfriend of nearly three years, Lucie Zolcerova. The AGT Tour Show stopped in 25 cities, beginning October 1 and ending November 7, 2010, where Grimm performed with other top ten contestants of the fifth season of AGT.

On June 1, 2011, Grimm married his fiancée, Lucie Zolcerova, in a small private ceremony in Maui, Hawaii. The ceremony was held on the beach at the Makena Beach & Golf Resort in front of about 30 family members. Andres Delos Santos and Nate Martin from "Ten Feet" along with Kevin and Dawn Okimoto and Alex Pula entertained the party, backing the newlyweds as they serenaded each other with their favorite song, "Islands in The Stream." Bill Medley of The Righteous Brothers was in attendance.

== Career ==
Grimm performed at Las Vegas, Nevada, casinos for eleven years prior to his AGT success.

=== 2010 ===
On September 29, 2010, Michael signed a record deal with Epic Records. The album was released on May 17, 2011.

Grimm performed at the 2010 Macy's Thanksgiving Day Parade. On December 3, 2010, Grimm and Smokey Robinson raised over $1 million during the 37th Annual Candlelight Concert.

=== 2011–present ===
On March 24, 2011, Grimm returned to The Ellen DeGeneres Show to promote his upcoming self-titled album and perform his newly released single (March 22, 2011) "Fallin'" written and recorded by Alicia Keys in 2002. The album debuted at #13 on US Pop Music Charts on May 26, 2011, selling 23,000 copies. According to the Billboard Top 200, his album was #13 the week of June 4, 2011.

Grimm performed on the Top Ten show of the sixth season of America's Got Talent on September 6, 2011. Also in the summer an autumn of 2011, Grimm opened for Stevie Nicks.

== Discography ==
=== Albums ===
Year	Album	Peak					Certifications (sales threshold)
Year	Album	US	US Heat	US Digital	US R&B	US Indie	Certifications (sales threshold)
2007	Michael Grimm Live: Released: 2007; Label: Michael Grimm; Format: CD, digital download	—	—	—	—	—	
2009	I Am Michael Grimm: Released: June 11, 2009; Label: Mattikay Music, LLC; Format: CD, digital download	—	37	—	—	—	
2010	Leave Your Hat On: Released: July 20, 2010; Label: Mattikay Music, LLC; Format: CD, digital download	101	1	22	19	22	
2011	Michael Grimm: Released: May 17, 2011; Label: Epic, Sony; Format: CD, digital download	13	—	—	—	—	
2012	Gumbo: Released: June 26, 2012						
2015	Grimm: Released: June 15, 2015						
US: 22,000
"—" denotes the album did not chart.

=== Singles ===
Year	Single	Peak chart positions		Album
Year	Single	US Pop	CAN Pop	Album
2011	"Fallin'"	82	86	Michael Grimm
"—" denotes a title that did not chart, or was not released in that territory.

=== Music videos ===
Year	Video	Director
2011	"I Am"	Andrew Deerin
2011	"Fallin'"	n/a

Preceded by Kevin Skinner	America's Got Talent winner Season 5 (Summer 2010)	Succeeded by Landau Eugene Murphy, Jr.
