= Haspop =

French stage director and musician

- Born: Hassan El Hajjami; Bron, France
- Origin: France, Moroccan descent
- Genre: Hip hop
- Occupations: Stage director, choreographer, dancer, and actor
- Years active: 2001–present
- Website: www.haspop.com

Hassan El Hajjami, also known as Haspop, is a French stage director, choreographer and dancer.

== Early life ==
He was born Hassan El Hajjami in Bron, France, to a family of modest means. From the ages of ten to twenty, he pursued the career of boxing, while at the same time earning a Certificat d'aptitude professionnelle in plastering and masonry. After asking a friend who was a street dancer to teach him some dance moves, Haspop turned his attention to dance. In 1999, he founded the hip-hop dance group, the Pockemon Crew, and went on to win a series of competitions, both on his own and with his group. In 2003, he was the individual champion in France for Popping, and then in 2004, he won the European title. In 2003 and 2004, the Pockemon Crew won French, world and European championships in hip-hop, including first place at Battle of the Year 2003 and, in 2004, World Champion with the group. Hassan toured Latin America and Asia as a soloist dancer with Käfig Company.

In 2005, he was invited by Cirque du Soleil to audition and was accepted. Unable to bring his two children (whom as of 2010 he visited routinely), he performed in the United States for Cirque du Soleil from 2005 to 2009 in the Love show in Las Vegas in the role of the "Walrus." In 2009, he decided to leave the Cirque, but with the challenges of the economic recession returned to street performance, residing in Santa Monica, until, in June 2010, he began his participation in America's Got Talent.

== Career ==
Hassan began to box at a young age at his father's request. He quickly excelled at the sport, going on to become an inter-club champion in France. One lazy afternoon he went to see a friend of his, a hip hop dancer who had performed in the town square in Lyon. Hassan became intrigued by the wild style of hip hop dancing. He was immediately addicted. His parents are devout Muslims and dancing is frowned upon in his culture, but it was something Hassan couldn't ignore. He began to learn from his friends and was a natural, quickly becoming a popping sensation. He became the Popping Champion of France, then Europe, then the World, as he created his own self-taught style he called Has-Pop Style. One day at work, a colleague brought his father a newspaper stating that Hassan was Champion of France. Hassan's father immediately thought it was for boxing, until his colleague corrected him. It was for dancing. Hassan's father was less than thrilled until he spoke to his son and learned that Hassan was making a very nice living from dance, while helping to support his parents and three brothers.

A friend who had auditioned for Cirque du Soleil in Paris was asked if he knew anyone that specialized in popping. Hassan was summoned, completely baffled as to why a circus would want a popping dancer to perform among their animals. After the audition, he went back to France to be with his wife, who was giving birth to his daughter. While she was in labor, he received a call from Cirque. The doctor went ballistic, but Hassan knew it was the call he'd been waiting for. He was cast as The Walrus, the lead dancer and principal character for "Love." The birth of his daughter Ines and his career happened at the same time. Hassan and family moved to Montreal to prep the show, and then to Las Vegas, where he became the star of "Love."

Hassan incorporates elements of comedy and playfulness into his dance style. He has performed internationally with Cirque Du Soleil and has also performed as a street dancer on Santa Monica's Third Street Promenade. His performances combine hip-hop dancing with elements of comedy.

In 2011 and 2012, Haspop appeared on many TV shows around the world such as "Beat the Best", "Arabs Got Talent", "La Meilleure Danse", and "Istanbul Cabaret Show"

In 2012 Haspop started the 9th season of the French TV show Star Academy as the choreographer. Star Academy is a three-month competition in which Haspop had a pivotal role as a judge and teacher counselor.

In early 2013 Haspop began the creation of the new Cirque Du Soleil Las Vegas project called "LIGHT", as the artistic director and choreographer. Until early 2015 Haspop worked with a cast of 20 dancers and aerialists creating new shows every other season, with the groundbreaking technology of 3D Mapping Led screens and interactive video, at LIGHT he worked closely with DJs such as Alesso, Nicky Romero, Disclosure & Skrillex, former members of Swedish House Mafia: Axwell & Ingrosso, video content producers Moment Factory. Producing events for Iheart Radio, Beats by DRE, DreamWorks, Baauer Studio B.

In 2015 until March 2016 took a vital role in addressing one of the world's most important causes—safe and sustainable water access—by assuming the position of Conceptor and Creator for the 4th annual show One Night for ONE DROP imagined by Cirque du Soleil. The show "Amanzi" was based on his own personal story and was performed for 2 preview performances and one night only Gala on March 18, 2016, at the Smith Center for the Performing Arts in Las Vegas. With more than 7000 spectators and more than 100 performing artists volunteering their time and artistry, the show event was a success, as US$6.5 million were raised for the One Drop organization. ...organization.

== America's Got Talent ==
Haspop auditioned for the fifth season of America's Got Talent in Los Angeles, which aired on June 1, 2010. The three judges, Howie Mandel, Piers Morgan, and Sharon Osbourne, unanimously voted him forward to the next round in Las Vegas. Once he reached Las Vegas, the judges selected him as among the 10 acts to move directly to the quarterfinals in Hollywood without having to compete in another round of eliminations. A total of 48 acts were ultimately selected for the quarterfinals in Hollywood. In Hollywood, he was in the third batch of 12 quarter finalists who performed live on July 27, 2010. The judges gave him positive reviews, with Howie Mandel commenting that "That is what I'm talking about. That is wow! It really is wow, Haspop!" Piers Morgan added that he thought Haspop's was "the performance of the night, so far." Sharon Osbourne agreed with the other two judges, stating that the performance was "spectacular, absolutely spectacular." On July 28, 2010, Haspop was voted by the viewers to move to the semifinals.
